= List of American Stanley Cup Final television announcers =

This is a list of American Stanley Cup Final television announcers.

== Play-by-play ==
Announcer	Years	Network(s)
Al Albert	1985	USA Network
Kenny Albert	2014 (Game 1); 2021; 2023, 2025, 2027	NBC/NBCSN
Kenny Albert	2014 (Game 1); 2021; 2023, 2025, 2027	TNT
Marv Albert	1976-1977	NHL Network
Ted Darling	1976	NHL Network
Win Elliot	1966	NBC
Mike Emrick	1987–1988; 1995–1999; 2006–2020	ESPN
Mike Emrick	1987–1988; 1995–1999; 2006–2020	Fox
Mike Emrick	1987–1988; 1995–1999; 2006–2020	OLN/Versus
Mike Emrick	1987–1988; 1995–1999; 2006–2020	NBC/NBCSN
Jim Gordon	1967–1968, 1979	CBS
Jim Gordon	1967–1968, 1979	NHL Network/WOR-TV
Dan Kelly	1969–1972; 1977–1980; 1982–1985	CBS
Dan Kelly	1969–1972; 1977–1980; 1982–1985	NHL Network
Dan Kelly	1969–1972; 1977–1980; 1982–1985	USA Network
Jiggs McDonald	1989–1992	SportsChannel America
Sean McDonough	2022, 2024, 2026, 2028	ABC
Sam Rosen	1986	ESPN
Tim Ryan	1973–1975; 1980	NBC
Tim Ryan	1973–1975; 1980	CBS
Gary Thorne	1993–2004	ESPN/ABC
Ken Wilson	1986	ESPN
Bob Wolff	1966	RKO General

NBC aired Games 1 and 4 of the 1966 Stanley Cup Final between the Montreal Canadiens and the Detroit Red Wings. Win Elliot served as the play-by-play man while Bill Mazer served as the color commentator for the games.

For the 1967 and 1968 playoffs, Jim Gordon worked play-by-play and Stu Nahan worked color commentary and intermission interviews for CBS. During the regular season, the duo alternated roles each week. For instance, Gordon provided the play-by-play on December 30 while Nahan did the same the next week. In 1968–69, Dan Kelly did play-by-play while Bill Mazer did color and intermission interviews. While Dan Kelly once again handled all of the play-by-play work in 1971, Jim Gordon replaced Bill Mazer in 1970–71. For the CBS' Stanley Cup Final coverage during this period, a third voice was added to the booth (Phil Esposito in 1971 and Harry Howell in 1972).

From 1972–73–1974–75, NBC not only televised the Stanley Cup Final (including a couple of games in prime time), but also weekly regular season games on Sunday afternoons. NBC also aired one regular season and a couple of playoff games in prime time during the first couple of seasons. Tim Ryan and Ted Lindsay (with Brian McFarlane as the intermission host) served as the commentators for NBC's NHL coverage during this period.

For the Stanley Cup Final, Jiggs McDonald served as the play-by-play man while Bill Clement was the color commentator for SportsChannel America. Also during the Stanley Cup Final, Mike Emrick served as the host while John Davidson served as the rinkside and intermission analyst (Herb Brooks filled that role in 1989).

2003 was the only year that ABC broadcast both the NBA and the Stanley Cup Final that involved teams from one city in the same year, as both the New Jersey Nets and the New Jersey Devils were in their respective league's finals. During ABC's broadcast of game three between the San Antonio Spurs and the Nets in New Jersey on June 8, Brad Nessler said that ABC was in a unique situation getting ready for both that game and game seven of the Stanley Cup Final between the Devils and the Mighty Ducks of Anaheim the following night, also at Continental Airlines Arena. Gary Thorne mentioned this the following night, and thanked Nessler for promoting ABC's broadcast of game seven of the Stanley Cup Final.

=== CBC feeds (1978–1981) ===
Announcer	Years	Network(s)
Bob Cole	1980–1981	Hughes
Bob Cole	1980–1981	USA Network
Danny Gallivan	1978	NHL Network
Dan Kelly	1978–1980	NHL Network
Dan Kelly	1978–1980	Hughes
Jim Robson	1980	Hughes

== Color commentators ==
Announcer	Years	Network(s)
Don Awrey	1977	NHL Network
Curt Bennett	1976	NHL Network
Brian Boucher	2021 (Game 2)	NBC/NBCSN
Bill Chadwick	1979	NHL Network/WOR-TV
Bill Clement	1986–2004	ESPN/ABC
Bill Clement	1986–2004	SportsChannel America
John Davidson	1995–1999; 2003–2004; 2006	Fox
John Davidson	1995–1999; 2003–2004; 2006	ABC
John Davidson	1995–1999; 2003–2004; 2006	OLN/NBC
Phil Esposito	1971	CBS
Ray Ferraro	2022, 2024, 2026, 2028	ABC
Emile Francis	1966	RKO General
Jim Gordon	1971–1972	CBS
Gary Green	1982–1985	USA Network
Harry Howell	1972	CBS
Ted Lindsay	1973–1975	NBC
Mike Liut	1985	USA Network
Bill Mazer	1969–1970	CBS
Stan Mikita	1976	NHL Network
Stu Nahan	1967–1968	CBS
Lou Nanne	1980	CBS
Eddie Olczyk	2007–2021; 2023, 2025, 2027	Versus
Eddie Olczyk	2007–2021; 2023, 2025, 2027	NBC/NBCSN
Eddie Olczyk	2007–2021; 2023, 2025, 2027	TNT
Mickey Redmond	1986, 1988	ESPN
Chico Resch	1976, 1978	NHL Network
Garry Unger	1976, 1978	NHL Network

=== CBC feeds (1978–1981) ===
Announcer	Years	Network(s)
Gary Dornhoefer	1979–1981	NHL Network
Gary Dornhoefer	1979–1981	Hughes
Gary Dornhoefer	1979–1981	USA Network
Dick Irvin Jr.	1978–1980	NHL Network
Dick Irvin Jr.	1978–1980	Hughes
Bobby Orr	1979	NHL Network
Mickey Redmond	1981	USA Network

== Ice-level analysts ==
Announcer	Years	Network(s)
Brian Boucher	2020–2021; 2025, 2027	NBC/NBCSN
Brian Boucher	2020–2021; 2025, 2027	TNT
Ray Ferraro	2022, 2024, 2026, 2028	ABC
Keith Jones	2023	TNT
Pierre McGuire	2006–2019, 2021 (Games 2 and 3)	NBC/NBCSN
Pierre McGuire	2006–2019, 2021 (Games 2 and 3)	OLN/Versus
Darren Pang	2011 (Games 6 and 7)	NBC

== Rinkside reporters ==
Announcer	Years	Network(s)
Erin Andrews	2004	ESPN/ABC
Herb Brooks	1989	SportsChannel America
John Davidson	1990–1992	SportsChannel America
Brian Engblom	1996–2003	ESPN/ABC
Bob Harwood	2006–2010	OLN/Versus
Emily Kaplan	2022, 2024, 2026, 2028	ABC
Jim Kelly	1986	ESPN
Steve Levy	1994–1999; 2001–2004	ESPN/ABC
Joe Micheletti	1995-1999	Fox
Tom Mees	1987–1988; 1993	ESPN
Al Morganti	1993–2002	ESPN
Sandra Neil	1996	Fox
Mickey Redmond	1988	ESPN
Darren Pang	1995-2004; 2023, 2025, 2027	ESPN/ABC
Darren Pang	1995-2004; 2023, 2025, 2027	NBC
Darren Pang	1995-2004; 2023, 2025, 2027	TNT
Jackie Redmond	2023, 2025, 2027	TNT
Sam Ryan	2003–2004	ESPN/ABC
Christine Simpson	1997; 2006–2009	OLN/Versus
Craig Simpson	1997	Fox
Charissa Thompson	2010	Versus

== Rules analysts ==
Announcer	Years	Network(s)
Dave Jackson	2022, 2024, 2026, 2028	ABC
Don Koharski	2023	TNT

== Studio hosts ==
Announcer	Years	Network(s)
Al Albert	1983 (in Long Island)	USA Network
Chris Berman	2003	ESPN/ABC
James Brown	1995–1998	Fox
Bill Clement	2006–2007	OLN/Versus
Bill Clement	2006–2007	NBC
Bill Cullen	1966	NBC
Mike Emrick	1989–1992	SportsChannel America
Jim Gordon	1971–1972	CBS
Suzy Kolber	1999	Fox
Steve Levy	2022, 2024, 2026, 2028	ABC
Bill Mazer	1969–1970	CBS
Brian McFarlane	1973–1975	NBC
Liam McHugh	2011–2019; 2021; 2023, 2025, 2027	NBC/NBCSN
Liam McHugh	2011–2019; 2021; 2023, 2025, 2027	TNT
Tom Mees	1986–1988	ESPN
Al Michaels	2000–2002	ABC
Bob Neumeier	2008	NBC
Darren Pang	2009	NBC
Bill Patrick	2008–2011	Versus
Dan Patrick	2010–2011	NBC
Tim Ryan	1980	CBS
John Saunders	1993–2004	ESPN/ABC
Jim Simpson	1966	NBC
Kathryn Tappen	2016–2021	NBC/NBCSN
Mike Tirico	2018–2019	NBC
Al Trautwig	1982–1985	USA Network
Jim Van Horne	1982 (in Vancouver)	USA Network

NBC's coverage of the 1966 Stanley Cup Final marked the first time that hockey games were broadcast on network television in color. The CBC would follow suit the following year. NBC's Stanley Cup coverage preempted a sports anthology series called NBC Sports in Action, hosted by Jim Simpson and Bill Cullen, who were between-periods co-hosts for the Stanley Cup broadcasts.

In the 1981–82 season, Al Trautwig took over as studio host for the USA Network. Dan Kelly did play-by-play with either Gary Green or Rod Gilbert on color commentary. For the playoffs, Dick Carlson and Al Albert were added as play-by-play voices of some games. Meanwhile, Jim Van Horne hosted Stanley Cup Final games played in Vancouver.

Things pretty much remained the same for USA during the 1982–83 season. Dan Kelly and Gary Green called most games, while Al Albert did play-by-play on several playoff games and hosted one game of the Stanley Cup Final.

=== CBC feeds (1978–1981) ===
Announcer	Years	Network(s)
Dave Hodge	1978–1981 (all locations except Montréal)	NHL Network
Dave Hodge	1978–1981 (all locations except Montréal)	Hughes
Dave Hodge	1978–1981 (all locations except Montréal)	USA Network
Dan Kelly and Dick Irvin Jr.	1978–1979 (in Montréal only)	NHL Network
Dan Kelly and Dick Irvin Jr.	1978–1979 (in Montréal only)	Hughes

== Studio analysts ==
Announcer	Years	Network(s)
Paul Bissonnette	2023, 2025, 2027	TNT
Brian Boucher	2016–2019; 2022	NBC/NBCSN
Brian Boucher	2016–2019; 2022	ABC
Herb Brooks	1989	SportsChannel America
Anson Carter	2015–2021; 2023, 2025, 2027	NBC/NBCSN
Anson Carter	2015–2021; 2023, 2025, 2027	TNT
Chris Chelios	2022	ABC
Terry Crisp	1998–1999	Fox
John Davidson	1990–1993; 2000–2002	SportsChannel America
John Davidson	1990–1993; 2000–2002	ESPN/ABC
Brian Engblom	2006–2010	OLN/Versus
Ray Ferraro	2006–2007	NBC
Wayne Gretzky	2023, 2025, 2027	TNT
Brett Hull	2007	NBC
Erik Johnson	2026 (Games 3 and 4)	ABC
Keith Jones	2006–2021	OLN/Versus
Keith Jones	2006–2021	NBC/NBCSN
Mike Liut	1985–1986	USA Network
Mike Liut	1985–1986	ESPN
Henrik Lundqvist	2023, 2025, 2027	TNT
Barry Melrose	1995–2004	ESPN/ABC
Mark Messier	2006–2008; 2022, 2024, 2026, 2028	OLN/Versus
Mark Messier	2006–2008; 2022, 2024, 2026, 2028	ABC
Mike Milbury	1995	ESPN
Mike Milbury	2008–2019	Versus
Mike Milbury	2008–2019	NBC/NBCSN
Dave Maloney	1995–1998	Fox
Pierre McGuire	2008	NBC
Ryan Miller	2010	NBC
Eddie Olczyk	2006	NBC
Darren Pang	1994, 1996, 2004, 2012-2013	ESPN/ABC
Darren Pang	1994, 1996, 2004, 2012-2013	NBC
Jeremy Roenick	2010; 2014–2019	NBC/NBCSN
Jim Schoenfeld	1993	ESPN
Patrick Sharp	2019–2021	NBC/NBCSN
P. K. Subban	2018; 2024, 2026, 2028	NBC
P. K. Subban	2018; 2024, 2026, 2028	ABC

=== CBC feeds (1978–1981) ===
Announcer	Years	Network(s)
Don Cherry	1981	USA Network
Howie Meeker	1981	USA Network

== Broadcast networks ==
- ABC (2000-2004; 2022, 2024, 2026, 2028)
- CBS (1967-1972; 1980)
- Fox (1995-1999)
- NBC (1966; 1973-1975; 2006-2021)

CBS managed to televise the 1971 Stanley Cup Final clincher on a Tuesday night and the 1972 Stanley Cup Final clincher on a Thursday night. In 1971, CBS was not scheduled to broadcast game seven of the Stanley Cup Final, but showed the prime time contest (the first ever occurrence of an NHL game being nationally televised in prime time in the United States) between the Montreal Canadiens and Chicago Black Hawks after fans reportedly swamped switchboards at network headquarters in New York City asking that the seventh game be televised. Ironically, the game was not telecast by CBS' Chicago owned-and-operated station WBBM-TV, nor on CBS affiliates in most of Illinois (except areas near St. Louis), and parts of Indiana, Wisconsin and Iowa, due to Blackhawks' owner Arthur M. Wirtz policy of not telecasting home games. While Dan Kelly once again handled all of the play-by-play work, Jim Gordon replaced Bill Mazer in 1970–71. For the CBS' Stanley Cup Final coverage during this period, a third voice was added to the booth (Phil Esposito in 1971 and Harry Howell in 1972).

During the 1972 Stanley Cup Final between the Boston Bruins and New York Rangers, CBS took a rather calculated risk in not televising the game five match on May 9 (CBS aired regular programming, including the original Hawaii Five-O in that time period on that Tuesday night). This was despite the fact that game five was a potential clincher with the Bruins up three games to one on the Rangers. CBS ultimately lucked out (since the Rangers won game five 3–2), and televised the clincher (Game 6) on Thursday night, May 11.

In 1979, ABC was contracted to televise game seven of the Stanley Cup Final. Since the Finals ended in five games, the contract was void. Had there been a Game 7, then Al Michaels would have called play-by-play alongside Jim McKay (between-periods host), Bobby Clarke (color commentator), and Frank Gifford (reporter, who would have been in the winning team's dressing room to interview players and coaches as well as hand the phone to the winning team's coach that would have allowed him to talk to both President Jimmy Carter and Prime Minister Pierre Trudeau). This would give Michaels the honor of being the first announcer to call the play-by-play in all four major sports, having called the Super Bowl, the World Series, and NBA Finals. The game would have started at 5:10 p.m. Eastern Daylight Time on a Saturday, replacing Wide World of Sports and local news shows that typically followed it on ABC stations in the Eastern and Central time zones.

Mainly influenced by the United States men's Olympic hockey team's surprise gold medal victory (dubbed "The Miracle on Ice") in Lake Placid several months prior, CBS agreed to pay $37 million to broadcast the sixth game of the 1980 Stanley Cup Final. In return, the NHL happily moved the starting time from prime time to the afternoon. The Saturday afternoon game was the first full American network telecast of an NHL game since game five of the 1975 Stanley Cup Final aired on NBC. By this time, Dan Kelly was joined by former NHL on NBC commentator, Tim Ryan. Kelly did play-by-play for the first and third periods as well as overtime. Meanwhile, Tim Ryan did play-by-play only for the second period. Minnesota North Stars general manager Lou Nanne was the color commentator throughout the game. This turned out to be the last NHL game on American network television until NBC televised the 1990 All-Star Game.

FOX split coverage of the Stanley Cup Final with ESPN. Game one of the 1995 Stanley Cup Final was the first Finals game shown on network television since 1980 and the first in prime time since 1973. FOX was scheduled to televise Games one, five, and sevem; and ESPN airs games two, three, four, and six. However, from 1995 to 1998, the Finals matches were all four game sweeps; the 1999 Finals ended in six games. The consequence was that – except for 1995, when Fox did televise game four – the decisive game was never shown on network television. Perhaps in recognition of this, games three through seven were always televised by ABC in the succeeding broadcast agreement between the NHL and ABC Sports/ESPN.

Before the 2004–05 lockout, the NHL had reached two separate deals with NBC (who would replace ABC as the NHL's American national broadcast television partner) and ESPN. ESPN offered the NHL $60 million for about 40 games (only fifteen of which would be during the regular season), all on ESPN2, with presumably, only some midweek playoff games, the first two games of the Stanley Cup Final and the All-Star Game airing on ESPN. The NBC deal stipulated that the network would pay the league no rights fees - an unheard of practice to that point. NBC's deal included six regular season windows, seven postseason broadcasts and games 3–7 of the Stanley Cup Final in primetime. The contracts were to commence when the lockout ended. The NBC deal expired after the 2006–07 season, and NBC had picked up the option to renew for the 2007–08 season (Just like the AFL/NBC agreement, which the network did not renew in 2006). The NHL and NBC shared in revenues from advertising.

As part of ESPN's new deal with the NHL, which starts with the 2021–22 season, ABC will exclusively air four Stanley Cup Final over the life of the contract (2022, 2024, 2026, and 2028). This will be the first time that a broadcast over-the-air network will exclusively air the Stanley Cup Final.

=== Cable ===
- TNT (2023, 2025, 2027)
- ESPN (1986-1988; 1993-2004)
- NBCSN (2012-2021)
- OLN/Versus (2006-2011)
- SportsChannel America (1989-1992)
- USA (1981-1985)

For USA's final full season of NHL coverage in 1984–85, Dan Kelly and Gary Green once again, did most games, while Al Albert and Green called the rest. In all, USA covered about 55 games, including 33 in the regular season. Also, Hartford Whalers goaltender Mike Liut was added as an intermission analyst for the Stanley Cup Final.

Games one and two of the 2006 Stanley Cup Final were on OLN, while the remainder of the series was on NBC.

Under the terms of the contract running from 2007–2011, Versus aired 54 or more NHL games each season, generally on Monday and Tuesday nights, and provided coverage of as many Stanley Cup Playoff games as possible (generally two per night in the first two rounds; the Conference Finals are usually played on alternating days), and two games of the Stanley Cup Final (Games 3 and 4 in 2009, 2010 and 2011).

In 2014, NBCSN broadcast games three and four, while NBC televised the remaining games. NBC Sports originally planned to repeat its coverage pattern from the last few seasons: NBCSN would televise games two and three, while NBC would broadcast game one, and then games four through seven. After the League scheduled game two on the day of the Belmont Stakes, coverage of games two and four were switched so NBC's telecast of the horse race would serve as lead-in programming to Game 2. Due to the death of a family member, NBC lead play-by-play announcer Mike Emrick missed Game 1. Kenny Albert, who was also the New York Rangers radio announcer for WEPN and announced several national games (including the Western Conference Finals) for NBC/NBCSN, filled in for Emrick in the first game.

It was originally announced that Games 2 and 3 of the 2015 Finals were to be broadcast by NBCSN, with the remainder on NBC. Game two was moved to NBC to serve as a lead-out for its coverage of the 2015 Belmont Stakes in favor of game four on NBCSN. As Eddie Olczyk was also a contributor to NBC's Belmont coverage, he missed Game 2.

On May 27, 2016, NBC Sports announced that if the Final was tied at 1-1 entering Game 3, then it would have aired on NBC and game four televised on NBCSN. However, if one team led 2-0 (as this eventually happened; Penguins led 2–0), game three would be moved to NBCSN and then game four on NBC.

Pursuant to the announcement of Turner Sports (now TNT Sports) claiming the NHL's new “B” package for the 2021–22 season, on April 27, 2021, TNT will air three Stanley Cup Final series in 2023, 2025 and 2027. In the 2023 Finals, TNT's coverage was simulcast on sister networks TruTV and TBS, the latter unavailable on Tuesdays due to Major League Baseball coverage.

== Syndication ==
- Hughes (1980)
- NHL Network (1976-1979)
- RKO General (1966)

In the United States, the clinching game of the 1966 Stanley Cup Final on the evening of Thursday, May 5 aired on RKO General's stations, such as WOR-TV in New York City and WHCT in Hartford, Connecticut. The commentators for RKO's coverage on that occasion were Bob Wolff and Emile Francis. Wolff at the time did play-by-play for New York Rangers games seen on WOR. Although the TV listings page of the May 5, 1966 edition of the Boston Globe indicated that RKO-owned WNAC-TV in Boston would not carry the game, the then-ABC-affiliated station did clear the broadcast at the last minute.

The 1976 Stanley Cup Final on the NHL Network marked the first time that the NHL's championship series was nationally televised in its entirety in the United States. Starting in the 1978 playoffs, the NHL Network began simulcasting many games with Hockey Night in Canada. In these games, Dan Kelly, who was the NHL Network's lead play-by-play broadcaster, was assigned to do play-by-play along with HNIC color commentators.

The entire 1979 Stanley Cup Final between the Montreal Canadiens and New York Rangers was simulcast as well. However, had that final gone to Game 7, then that game would have been broadcast on ABC.

Hughes televised games 1-5 of the 1980 Stanley Cup Final (the final game, Game 6, was broadcast by CBS). Hughes technically, used CBC's Hockey Night in Canada feeds for the American coverage of the first five games of the Stanley Cup Final.

== Announcers by network ==
- ABC
- CBS
- Fox
- NBC

=== Cable ===
- ESPN
- NBCSN
- OLN/Versus
- SportsChannel America
- TNT
- USA

=== Syndication ===
- Hughes
- NHL Network
- RKO General

== See also ==
- History of the National Hockey League on United States television
- Stanley Cup Final#Broadcasting
- List of Canadian Stanley Cup Final television announcers
- List of Stanley Cup Final broadcasters
- List of current National Hockey League broadcasters
- Stanley Cup Final television ratings
