= History of the National Hockey League on United States television =

The National Hockey League has never fared as well on American television in comparison to the National Basketball Association, Major League Baseball, or the National Football League, although that has begun to change, with NBC's broadcasts of the final games of the 2009, 2010, 2011, and 2013 Stanley Cup Final scoring some of the best ratings ever enjoyed by the sport on American television.

In fact, hockey broadcasting on a national scale was spotty prior to 1981; NBC and CBS held rights at various times, each network carrying weekend-afternoon games during the second half of the regular season and the playoffs, along with some (but not all) of the Stanley Cup Final. From 1971 to 1995, there was no exclusive coverage of games in the United States.

Meanwhile, individual teams have long contracted to air their games on local channels, primarily on regional sports networks and in a few cases on broadcast channels as well.

== 1950s (CBS) ==
CBS first broadcast Saturday afternoon National Hockey League games for four seasons from 1956–1960. Initially, Bud Palmer served as the play-by-play man while Fred Cusick did color commentary and intermission interviews for the first three seasons. In 1959–60, Cusick moved over to play-by-play while Brian McFarlane came in to do the color commentary and intermission interviews. The pregame and intermission interviews were done on the ice, with the interviewer on skates. No playoff games were televised during this period, and all broadcasts took place in one of the four American arenas at the time.

As previously mentioned, CBS covered the 1956–57 season on Saturday afternoons, starting January 5. For the next three years, they aired games on Saturday afternoons starting on November 2, 1957, October 18, 1958, and January 9, 1960.

According to Sports Illustrated, the NHL dropped CBS because the NHL owners didn't want the fledgling Players' Association to gain a financial cut of the television deal. This was despite the fact that CBS was at least at one point, getting better ratings than NBC's NBA package from around the same period, especially in cities with NHL, minor-league, or major college (division 1 level) hockey clubs.

== 1960s ==
=== 1966 (NBC and RKO General) ===
The NHL did not return to national television in the United States until the 1966 playoffs.

NBC was the first United States television network to air a national broadcast of a Stanley Cup Playoff game. They provided coverage of four Sunday afternoon playoff games during the 1966 postseason. On April 10 and April 17, NBC aired semifinal games between the Chicago Blackhawks and Detroit Red Wings. On April 24 and May 1, NBC aired games one and four of the Stanley Cup Final between the Montreal Canadiens and the Detroit Red Wings respectively. Win Elliot served as the play-by-play man while Bill Mazer served as the color commentator for all four games.

NBC's coverage of the 1966 Stanley Cup Playoffs marked the first time that hockey games were televised on network television in color, although a handful of local game telecasts in Boston (WHDH-TV), New York (WOR-TV), and Chicago (WGN-TV) had been colorcast during the regular-season that year. The Canadian Broadcasting Corporation would follow suit the following year. NBC's Stanley Cup coverage preempted a sports anthology series called NBC Sports in Action hosted by Jim Simpson and Bill Cullen, who were between-periods co-hosts for the four Stanley Cup broadcasts.

In the United States, the clinching game of the 1966 Stanley Cup Final on the Thursday evening of May 5 aired in black and white on RKO General-owned stations (including WOR-TV in New York and WNAC-TV in Boston). The commentators for RKO's coverage on that occasion were Bob Wolff and Emile Francis, who had called WOR-TV's coverage of New York Rangers games during the regular season.

CBS had gained rights for an NHL "Game Of The Week" for the 1966–67 regular-season; but could not accommodate regular-season games, so instead, those Sunday-afternoon games were subleased to RKO General.

=== 1966–69 (CBS) ===
In 1967, CBS carried weekend-afternoon games of the Stanley Cup Playoffs. For the next five seasons, from 1968 through 1972, CBS aired a game each week between mid-January until early-mid May in each of those seasons, mainly on a Sunday afternoon, including playoffs. From 1968 to 1969 through 1971–72, the intermission studio was called "CBS Control", as was the case with other sports coverage, including the NFL coverage.

CBS started their weekly 1967–68 coverage with the opening game (the Philadelphia Flyers vs. Los Angeles Kings) at the Forum in Inglewood, California on December 30. Then after three more Saturday afternoons (because the network was tied-up with pro football on Sundays), CBS switched to Sunday afternoons beginning on January 28 for the next 10 weeks. Due to an AFTRA strike (which resulted in the cancellation of a New York Rangers-Montreal broadcast), CBS started their playoff coverage with a CBC tape of the previous night's Boston-Montreal game. On April 13, CBS started their three-week-long weekend afternoon Stanley Cup coverage. The last game of the series was St. Louis-Montreal on May 11. For the playoffs, Jim Gordon worked play-by-play and Stu Nahan worked color and intermission interviews. During the regular season, the pair alternated roles each week.

In the 1968–69 season, CBS broadcast 13 regular season afternoon games and five Stanley Cup playoff games. Dan Kelly did play-by-play while Bill Mazer did color and intermission interviews. Kelly had become the radio voice of the St. Louis Blues, whose games were covered by CBS-owned KMOX St. Louis; thus, Kelly was already part of CBS through his being on KMOX's payroll.

== 1970s ==
=== 1971–72 ===
The same pattern continued through the 1971–72 season for CBS. CBS did manage to televise the 1971 Stanley Cup Final clincher on a Tuesday night and the 1972 Stanley Cup Final clincher on a Thursday night. In 1971, CBS originally had not planned to broadcast game seven of the Stanley Cup Final but showed the prime time contest between the Montreal Canadiens and Chicago Black Hawks almost as a public service after thousands of calls flooded network switchboards. While Dan Kelly once again did all the play-by-play work, Jim Gordon replaced Bill Mazer in 1970–71. For the CBS' Stanley Cup Final coverage during this period, a third voice was added to the booth (Phil Esposito in 1971 and Harry Howell in 1972).

=== 1972–75 (NBC) ===
From 1972–1975, NBC not only televised the Stanley Cup Final (in actuality, a couple of games in prime time), but also weekly regular season games on Sunday afternoons. NBC also aired several regular season and playoff games in prime time during this period (namely, during the 1972–1973 season). Tim Ryan and Ted Lindsay (with Brian McFarlane as the intermission host) served as the commentators for NBC's NHL coverage during this period. Since most NHL teams still didn't have players' names on the backs of jerseys, NBC persuaded NHL commissioner Clarence Campbell to make teams put on players' names on NBC telecasts beginning with the 1973–74 season to help viewers identify players.

NBC's NHL coverage during the 1970s introduced the animated character Peter Puck as a between-periods feature. Peter Puck, whose cartoon adventures (produced by Hanna-Barbera) appeared on both NBC's Hockey Game of the Week and CBC's Hockey Night in Canada, explained hockey rules to the home viewing audience.

Besides Peter Puck, the 1970s version of The NHL on NBC had a between periods feature titled Showdown. The concept of Showdown involved with 20 (16 shooters and four goaltenders) of the NHL's greatest players going head-to-head in a taped penalty shot competition. After the NHL left NBC in 1975, Showdown continued to be seen on Hockey Night in Canada and local television broadcasts of U.S.-based NHL teams.

Meanwhile, HBO's first sports broadcast was of a New York Rangers / Vancouver Canucks game, transmitted to a CATV system in Wilkes Barre, Pennsylvania on November 8, 1972.

=== 1975–79 (The NHL Network, CBS, and USA Network) ===
After being dropped by NBC after the 1974–75 season, the NHL had no national network television contract in the United States. So in response to this, the league decided to launch the first version of the NHL network, which was a network of independent stations that covered approximately 55% of the country.

During the 1975–76 season, this package consisted of four exhibition games between NHL clubs and the Soviet national hockey team, then playoff games including the Stanley Cup Final.

Beginning with the 1976–77 season, games typically aired on Monday nights (beginning at 8 p.m. ET) or Saturday afternoons. The package was offered to local stations free of charge. Profits would be derived from the advertising, which was about evenly split between the network and the local station. The Monday night games were often billed as The NHL Game of the Week. The league hoped that the habit millions of viewers had of watching sports on Monday nights during the National Football League season would carry over to hockey in winter. Since ABC, which at that time carried Monday Night Football would also carry Monday-night Major League Baseball games during the 1976 season, the league tried to market this package to ABC affiliates in the hopes they'd pick it up and establish a year-round sports franchise on Monday nights. However, not very many stations picked up the package, and only a couple were ABC affiliates.

During the 1975–76 season, the NHL Network showed selected games from the NHL Super Series as well as some playoff games. During the 1976–77 season, the NHL Network showed 12 regular season games on Monday nights plus the All-Star Game. By 1978–79 (the final season of the NHL Network's existence), there would be 18 Monday night games and 12 Saturday afternoon games covered.

The 1979 Challenge Cup replaced the All-Star Game. It was a best of three series between the NHL All-Stars against the Soviet Union national squad. In the United States, parts of Game 2, which was on a Saturday afternoon, were shown on CBS as part of The CBS Sports Spectacular, sandwiched in between a track meet, a welterweight boxing match, and women's surfing. The NHL had sold advertising on the boards at Madison Square Garden, which CBS asked the league to remove. When the league refused, CBS directed their cameras to not show the far side boards. As a result, CBS viewers were unable to see the far boards above the yellow kickplate, and when players were on that side, only their skates were visible; the rest of their bodies were cropped out from the picture.

In 1979, ABC was contracted to televise game seven of Stanley Cup Final. Since the Finals ended in five games, the contract was void.

In 1979–80, the National Hockey League replaced their syndicated coverage package with a package on USA. At the time, the USA Network was called UA-Columbia. As the immediate forerunner for the USA Network, UA-Columbia, served as the cable syndicated arm of the Madison Square Garden Network in New York, PRISM channel in Philadelphia, and whatever pay/cable outlets were around in 1979. USA's coverage begin as a Monday night series with Dan Kelly doing play-by-play alongside a variety of commentators including Pete Stemkowski, Lou Nanne and Brian McFarlane. Meanwhile, Scott Wahle was the intermission host on most games.

== 1980s ==
=== 1980 (CBS) ===
Since the NHL left CBS in 1972, the network has aired only one NHL contest: game six of the Stanley Cup Final between the Philadelphia Flyers and the New York Islanders on Saturday, May 24, 1980. After the surprisingly high ratings of the Miracle on Ice at the 1980 Winter Olympics, CBS decided to carry the contest as part of its CBS Sports Spectacular. Dan Kelly, who at the time was also working for CBC (and had called the previous five games on that network) was called on to return to CBS' coverage. He shared these duties with Tim Ryan, who had left NBC for CBS in 1977. Lou Nanne, the then-general manager of the Minnesota North Stars, was the analyst. Kelly and Ryan split the first two periods, with Kelly calling the third period and, when the regulation ended 4–4, the overtime period as well.

Between the end of regulation and the start of extra session, CBS switched to the Memorial Golf Tournament in Dublin, Ohio; the golf announcers repeatedly mentioned that the network would return to hockey in time for the start of overtime, which they did. The Islanders settled matters with a goal by Bobby Nystrom at 7:11 of the OT, capturing their first of their four consecutive Stanley Cups.

Not only was it the last NHL contest on CBS (as of 2025), it was the last NHL contest on any US TV broadcast network for nearly a decade; not until 1990 did the NHL return to one of the major broadcast networks, when NBC carried the All-Star Game.

=== 1980–85 (ESPN and USA Network) ===
For the USA Network's 1980–81 season, some Sunday night games were added. Dan Kelly once again, did most of the play-by-play alongside Mike Eruzione. Dick Carlson, Gene Hart, and Jiggs McDonald also did play-by-play work on occasion. In addition, Don Cherry was a commentator for at least one game. Meanwhile, Jim West was the host for most games.

In the meantime, ESPN enjoyed their first go around at NHL coverage during the 1980–81 and 1981–82 seasons. They had a rather limited slate of games, which were all broadcast from U.S. arenas: Hartford, Washington, Pittsburgh, Buffalo, Minnesota, St. Louis and Colorado in 1980–81 and the New York Islanders (while deleting Hartford) in 1981–82.

In the 1981–82 season, Al Trautwig took over as USA's studio host. Dan Kelly did play-by-play with either Gary Green or Rod Gilbert on color commentary. For the playoffs, Dick Carlson and Al Albert were added as play-by-play voices of some games. Meanwhile, Jim Van Horne hosted Stanley Cup Final games played in Vancouver.

In April 1982, USA outbid ESPN for the NHL's American national television cable package with $8 million (at least $2 more than what ESPN was offering).

Things pretty much remained the same for USA during the 1982–83 season. Dan Kelly and Gary Green called most games, while Al Albert did play-by-play on several playoff games and hosted two games of the Stanley Cup Final from Long Island.

In the 1983–84 season, USA covered over 40 games including the playoffs. While Gary Green did all the games, Dan Kelly and Al Albert did roughly 20 games each. Meanwhile, Jiggs McDonald helped broadcast at least one game.

For USA's final season of NHL coverage in 1984–85, Dan Kelly and Gary Green once again, did most games, while Al Albert and Green called the rest. Also, Mike Liut was added as an intermission analyst for the Stanley Cup Final.

=== 1985–88 (ESPN) ===
ESPN would next broadcast the NHL in 1985–86, taking over from the USA Network in the American national cable television rights. ESPN aired approximately 33 weekly (Thursdays until the end of the National Football League season, then Sundays, both evenings at 7:30 p.m. Eastern Time), nationally televised (albeit, subject to blackout) regular season games a year (as well as the All-Star Game and entire Stanley Cup Final). Sam Rosen, Mike Emrick, and Ken Wilson, served as the play-by-play men while Mickey Redmond and Bill Clement were the color commentators. Tom Mees meanwhile, was the studio host. ESPN would ultimately go on another hiatus (lasting through the end of the 1991–92 season) from the National Hockey League following the 1987–88 season, when SportsChannel America outbid them.

=== 1988–89 (SportsChannel America) ===
Taking over for ESPN, SportsChannel's contract paid $51 million ($17 million per year) over three years, more than double what ESPN had paid ($24 million) for the previous three years. SportsChannel America managed to get a fourth NHL season for just $5 million.

Unfortunately, SportsChannel America was only available in a few major markets, and reached only a 1/3 of the households that ESPN did at the time. SportsChannel America was seen in fewer than 10 million households. In comparison, by the 1991–92 season, ESPN was available in 60.5 million homes whereas SportsChannel America was available in only 25 million. Since SportsChannel Philadelphia did not air until January 1990, PRISM (owned by Rainbow Media, the owners of SportsChannel, at the time) picked up the 1989 Stanley Cup Final.

SportsChannel America would televise about 80–100 games a season (whereas ESPN aired about 33 in the 1987–88 season). Whereas the previous deal with ESPN called for only one nationally televised game a week, SportsChannel America televised hockey two nights a week in NHL cities and three nights a week elsewhere.

In 1989, SportsChannel America provided the first ever American coverage of the NHL Draft.

In September 1989, SportsChannel America covered the Washington Capitals training camp in Sweden and pre-season tour of the Soviet Union. The Capitals were joined by the Stanley Cup champion Calgary Flames, who held training camp in Prague, Czechoslovakia and then ventured to the Soviet Union. Each team played four games against Soviet National League clubs. Games were played in Moscow, Leningrad, Kiev and Riga. The NHL clubs finished with a combined 6–2 record against the top Soviet teams, including the Red Army club and Dynamo Moscow. Five of the eight contests were televised by SportsChannel America.

SportsChannel America was the exclusive broadcaster of the 1989 All-Star Game.

Many regular-season games were actually simulcasts of games produced for local telecast by regional cable sports networks that carried the broadcasts.

== 1990s ==
=== 1990–92 (NBC and SportsChannel America) ===
In 1990, SportsChannel America covered the first ever NHL Skills Competition and Heroes of Hockey game. To accommodate the altered activities, the game itself was played on a Sunday afternoon instead of a Tuesday night, as was the case in previous years. This allowed American broadcaster NBC to air the game live across the United States – marking (surprisingly) the first time that a national audience would see Wayne Gretzky and Mario Lemieux play. Referees and other officials were also wired with microphones in this game, as were the two head coaches. Finally, NBC also was allowed to conduct interviews with players during stoppages in play, to the chagrin of the Hockey Night in Canada crew, whose attempts to do likewise were repeatedly denied by the league in past years.

From 1990–1994, NBC only televised the All-Star Game. Marv Albert and John Davidson called the action, while Mike Emrick served as an ice-level reporter in 1990. Meanwhile, Bill Clement served as an ice-level reporter in 1991, 1992 and 1994. Hockey Night in Canada's Ron MacLean also served as an ice-level reporter and was the lone correspondent for NBC for the 44th National Hockey League All-Star Game in 1993.

In 1991, NBC broke away from the telecast in the third period to televise a briefing from the Pentagon involving the Gulf War. SportsChannel America included the missing coverage in a replay of NBC's telecast.

There were reports about NBC making an arrangement to air four to eight regular season games for the 1992–1993 season but nothing materialized. NHL officials had arranged a 4–8 game, time-buy package on NBC, but that fell through when the NHL wanted assurance that all NBC affiliates would carry the games. (Since 2006, NBC has generally gotten all but a couple of affiliates in the Top-50 markets to carry the games.) For instance, in 1990, NBC stations in Atlanta, Charlotte, Memphis, New Orleans, Indianapolis and Phoenix didn't clear the game. As a matter of fact, roughly 15% of the nation didn't clear the game. More to the point, NBC's coverage of the 1992 All-Star Game aired on the independent station WTLK in Atlanta.

=== 1992–94 (ABC, NBC, and ESPN) ===
From its debut in the 1992–93 NHL season until the 2001–02 NHL season, weekly regular season games were broadcast on ESPN on Sundays (between NFL and baseball seasons), Wednesdays, and Fridays, and were titled Sunday/Wednesday/Friday Night Hockey. Prior to the 1999, these telecasts were non-exclusive, meaning they were blacked out in the regions of the competing teams, and an alternate game was shown in these affected areas.

In the 1992–1993 season, ABC televised five weekly playoff telecasts (the first three weeks were regional coverage of various games and the last two were national games) on Sunday afternoons starting on April 18 and ending on May 16. This marked the first time that playoff (or any) National Hockey League games were broadcast on American network television since 1975 (when NBC was the NHL's American broadcast television partner).

In the 1993–94 season, ABC televised six weekly regional telecasts on the last three Sunday afternoons beginning on March 27, 1994, marking the first time that regular season National Hockey League games were broadcast on American network television since NBC did it in 1974–75. ABC then televised three weeks worth of playoff games on first three Sundays – the final game was game one of the Eastern Conference Semifinals between the Boston Bruins and the New Jersey Devils, a game that was aired nationally. The network did not televise the Stanley Cup Final, which instead, were televised nationally by ESPN and by Prime Ticket in Los Angeles (1993) and MSG Network in New York (1994). Games televised on ABC were not subject to blackout.

These broadcasts (just as was the case with the 2000–2004 package) were essentially, time-buys by ESPN, In other words, ABC would sell three-hour blocks of airtime to ESPN. who in return, would produce and distribute the telecasts. Overall, ABC averaged a 1.7 rating for those two seasons. The main difference is that the graphics were ABC Sports' instead of the ones seen on ESPN National Hockey Night. In later years, the roles would be reversed as ESPN's graphical style would be used except for intermission reports. ABC even used ESPN's theme music for the 1992–1994 coverage.

=== 1995–99 (Fox and ESPN) ===
While ESPN regained the national hockey contract in 1992–93 (as previously mentioned), they were joined by the Fox network in 1994–95. Fox televised between five and eleven regionally distributed games on Saturday or Sunday afternoons during the regular season, where anywhere from three to six games ran concurrently.

For Fox's coverage of the All-Star Game, Conference Finals, and Stanley Cup Finals, the games (which were national telecasts) were hosted from the arena. The 1996 and 1997 All-Star Games were televised in prime time.

Fox had put much effort into trying to stimulate American interests in the game, but had achieved little success. One of their schemes was to make the hockey puck more visible by highlighting it on television with a blue comet, using FoxTrax. When a slapshot over 70 miles per hour was made, the puck would leave a red comet trail on the television. This idea was met with great derision in Canada, especially to diehard hockey fans, and also met with little success in the United States.

The main broadcast team for Fox was Mike Emrick and John Davidson, while regionally distributed games were handled by a variety of announcers. In the first four years of the deal, James Brown and Dave Maloney hosted the show from the Fox studio in Los Angeles. In the final year, it was Suzy Kolber and Terry Crisp.

Fox split coverage of the Stanley Cup Final with ESPN. Game one of the 1995 Stanley Cup Final was the first Finals game shown on network television since 1980 and the first in prime time since 1973. Games one, five, and seven were usually scheduled to be televised by Fox; games two, three, four, and six by ESPN. However, from 1995 to 1998, the Finals were all four game sweeps; 1999 ended in six games. The consequence was that – except for 1995, when Fox did televise game four – the decisive game was never on network television. Perhaps in recognition of this, Games 3–7 were always televised by ABC in the succeeding broadcast agreement between the NHL and ABC Sports/ESPN.

The deal between Fox and the league ended when the NHL announced a new television deal with ESPN that also called for ABC to become the new network television partner. Fox challenged that it had not been given a chance to match the network component of the deal, but ABC ultimately prevailed (perhaps barring a large NHL ratings increase).

== 2000s ==
=== 2000–04 (ABC, ESPN and ESPN2) ===
In August 1998, ABC, ESPN, and ESPN2 signed a five-year deal worth a total of approximately $600 million (or $120 million per year).

This time around, ABC televised four to five weeks worth of regional games on Saturday afternoons beginning in January. ABC also televised the National Hockey League All-Star Game and Games 3–7 of the Stanley Cup Final in prime time.

Following the 2003–04 season, ABC/ESPN was only willing to renew for two years at $60 million per year. ABC executives later conceded that they overpaid for the 1999–2004 deal, so their offer to renew the television rights was lower in 2004.

=== 2005–07 (NBC and OLN/Versus) ===
Before the 2004–05 lockout, the NHL had reached two separate deals with NBC and ESPN. The NBC deal stipulated that the network would pay the league no rights fees – an unheard of practice to that point. NBC's deal included six regular season windows, seven postseason broadcasts and Games 3–7 of the Stanley Cup Final in primetime. The contracts were to commence when the lockout ended. The NBC deal expired after the 2006–07 season, and NBC had picked up the option to renew for the 2007–08 season (Just like the AFL/NBC agreement, which the network did not renew in 2006). The NHL and NBC share in revenues from advertising.

ESPN had a two-year deal that they opted out of after the lockout, leaving the NHL without a cable partner. In August 2005, Comcast (who owns the Philadelphia Flyers) paid $70 million a year for three years to put games (54 or more NHL games each season under the agreement, generally on Monday and Tuesday nights) on the OLN network, now known as the NBC Sports Network. Due to the abbreviated off-season, the 2005–06 schedule did not offer OLN exclusivity, which they received in 2006–07. Versus also covered many playoff games and exclusively airs two games of the Stanley Cup Final.

Included in Versus' schedule was a "Game of the Week" for selected dates. In this "Exclusive" time period, which was created in 2006–07, no other National Hockey League game could be broadcast in the United States and, in most cases, no other game is scheduled unless it involves two Canadian teams. Regional carriers were allowed to air games outside Versus' exclusive window. This was usually for about 2 hours and 30 minutes. These Stipulations continued when the network merged with NBC Sports.

Like NBC, games aired on The NHL on Versus usually featured teams based in the United States, with the exception of playoffs. In the case of playoffs, Versus would occasionally simulcast TSN or CBC, although this mostly occurred in 2005–06; in seasons after and up to the creation of NBC Sports Net, Versus made a greater commitment in offering its own production whenever possible. After the NBC takeover they still occasionally used a few Comcast SportsNet feeds.

The selection of teams for The NHL on Versus was somewhat more diverse (possibly due to there being more game slots to air) than its broadcast partner, NBC. Because of inordinately high ratings in the Buffalo and Pittsburgh markets, Versus made note to air a significant number of games featuring the Buffalo Sabres and Pittsburgh Penguins. The New York Rangers, Philadelphia Flyers, Detroit Red Wings, and Boston Bruins also got selected regularly, frequently at or near the maximum of nine appearances per team during the regular season.

Any regular season game selected by Versus aired exclusively on that network. During the playoffs, Versus' first-round and second-round games were subject to blackouts in the participating teams' regional markets (although they had exclusivity for two second-round games per series). Versus regained full national coverage for its Conference and Stanley Cup Final telecasts.

In 2006, NBC televised game one of the Eastern Conference Finals between the Buffalo Sabres and the Carolina Hurricanes on the same day as the Preakness. Before the game, Bill Clement advised the audience that in the event that the game went into overtime, it would be televised on OLN. The Sabres won the game in regulation.

For the 2006–07 season, NBC broadcast three regional games per weekend of coverage during the regular season. They also scheduled ten coverage windows during the playoffs (not including Stanley Cup Finals). The additional broadcasts were expected to replace the Arena Football League, which NBC dropped after the 2006 season as previously mentioned. NBC also produced two games per week in high definition, up from one in 2005–06.

=== 2007–09 ===
The newly titled NHL on NBC Game of the Week premiered for a second season January 13, 2007 with three regional games (LA vs. STL, BOS vs. NYR, PIT vs. PHI) at 2:00 p.m. ET. Games started at various times, ranging from 12:30 to 3:30 during the season (this variation primarily resulted from NBC's commitments to the PGA Tour and other programming).

It was also rumored that the league wanted to stage (and for NBC to broadcast) an annual outdoor game (specifically, the New York Rangers vs. the New York Islanders at Yankee Stadium). Having lost rights to the Gator Bowl on New Year's Day to CBS, the possibility of doing a New Year's Day game increased, assuming that NBC would renew its broadcast contract. An outdoor game (instead involving the Buffalo Sabres and Pittsburgh Penguins) did end up being added for the 2007–2008 season.

The NHL on NBC moved to Sundays after its season premiere for the final eight dates of the season. NBC's nine games amounted to the league's most extensive U.S. broadcast television coverage since 1998, during Fox's tenure.

On May 19, 2007, during the Stanley Cup playoffs, NBC angered many fans and journalists when it pre-empted coverage of the overtime period of the tied game five of the Eastern Conference Finals between the Ottawa Senators and Buffalo Sabres, instead going directly to pre-race coverage of the 2007 Preakness Stakes (a horse racing broadcast generally contains about two hours of pre-race coverage, with the actual races lasting two or three minutes). Coverage of the overtime period was shunted to Versus, the league's cable partner, although viewers in the Buffalo and Rochester markets were able to continue watching the game on WGRZ and WHEC, their local NBC affiliates.

The move was originally seen not only as a snub of small-market teams (such as the Sabres), but of hockey in general. However, NBC and the NHL later revealed that the Preakness deal had been made several years before and contained mandatory advertising commitments during the pre-race build-up. Both sides could have agreed that the entire game would air only on Versus or begin earlier in the day, but the NHL wanted at least one Eastern Conference Finals game to air on NBC, and said that it does not schedule with the assumption that games will go into overtime. Moreover, an earlier start time could not be arranged because the broadcast window was fixed in advance, and both the NHL and NBC needed the flexibility to pick the Western Conference Finals for that window if they so desired.

On March 27, 2007, NBC Sports and the NHL agreed to a one-year contract extension with a network option for a second year.

Beginning in 2007–08, NBC has "Flex Scheduling", similar to NFL broadcasts. The league selects at least three potential games at the start of the season for most of NBC's regular-season coverage dates. Thirteen days prior to the game, NBC selects one to air as its Game of the Week. The other two games move outside of NBC's broadcast window and return to teams' regional carriers. Since the league made network coverage a priority in the 1990s, regionalized coverage had been the norm; NBC is the first network to try regularly presenting one game to the entire nation. Additionally, studio segments now originate from the game site instead of 30 Rockefeller Center. All games are produced in high definition.

=== 2008–2009 ===
On New Year's Day, January 1, 2008, NBC began its 2007–08 schedule with an outdoor hockey game (the AMP NHL Winter Classic) between the Buffalo Sabres and Pittsburgh Penguins at Ralph Wilson Stadium. The game went head to head with some of the New Year's Day college football bowl games, but none of the feature Bowl Championship Series games. While never expected to beat or directly compete with football ratings the timing was designed to take advantage of the large audience flipping between channels to watch the different bowl games. It was the first such game to be televised live by an American network and the NHL's first outdoor regular season game since the Edmonton Oilers and Montreal Canadiens played the Heritage Classic, which aired on CBC. CBC also showed the 2008 outdoor game. Although originally maligned as a mere publicity stunt by some in the media, the 2008 Winter Classic drew a 2.6 Nielsen rating in the U.S. (or about 2.9 million viewers), the highest rating for a regular-season contest since February 1996, when Fox was the league's network partner. By comparison, CBS received a 2.7 rating for the Gator Bowl, which also had a 1 p.m. start.

Except for New Year's Day and a day-after-Thanksgiving broadcast beginning in 2011, all regular-season telecasts now air on Sunday afternoons.

In April 2008, NBC announced the activation of its option to retain broadcasting rights for the 2008–2009 season. NBC's scheduling will be similar to the 2007–2008 season (flex scheduling for regular-season games, games three through seven of the Stanley Cup Finals, etc.) except that all (or nearly all) of the Sunday-afternoon games will begin at 12:30 p.m. Eastern time. Coverage again included an outdoor game, which was between the Detroit Red Wings and the Chicago Blackhawks at Wrigley Field on January 1, 2009.

The NHL on NBC usually only features U.S.-based teams, except during the Stanley Cup playoffs when broadcasting a game involving a Canadian team might be unavoidable. NBC has the first choice of games and times on its scheduled broadcast dates. CBC and TSN are required to adjust accordingly during the playoffs, even though both pay the league substantial rights fees.

In 2008, this changed as the Montreal Canadiens was the first Canadian team featured on the NHL on NBC during the regular-season (NBC Sports' Dick Ebersol is rumored to have specifically wanted to do a game from Montreal at some point). They played the New York Rangers on February 3 (which was Super Bowl Sunday that year; Montreal traditionally hosts a matinee game on Super Bowl Sunday).

Like its predecessors, NBC frequently chooses games with a focus on about five teams (New York Rangers, Detroit Red Wings, Philadelphia Flyers, Pittsburgh Penguins, and Boston Bruins). The relation has very little correlation with team success; for instance, the Anaheim Ducks won the Stanley Cup in 2007, and the Buffalo Sabres made it to the conference finals in both 2006 and 2007. Those teams received one and two potential games respectively in the 2008 season, compared to the seven potential games given to the Rangers and the four games which could include the Flyers. However, no team can air more than four times during the regular-season.

The most frequently cited reasons for this relative lack of diversity are low ratings in a market (such as for Anaheim, which competes with the older Los Angeles Kings in its market) and market size (such as for Buffalo, where hockey ratings are the highest in the league, but the market itself is the smallest of any American NHL team).

== 2010s ==
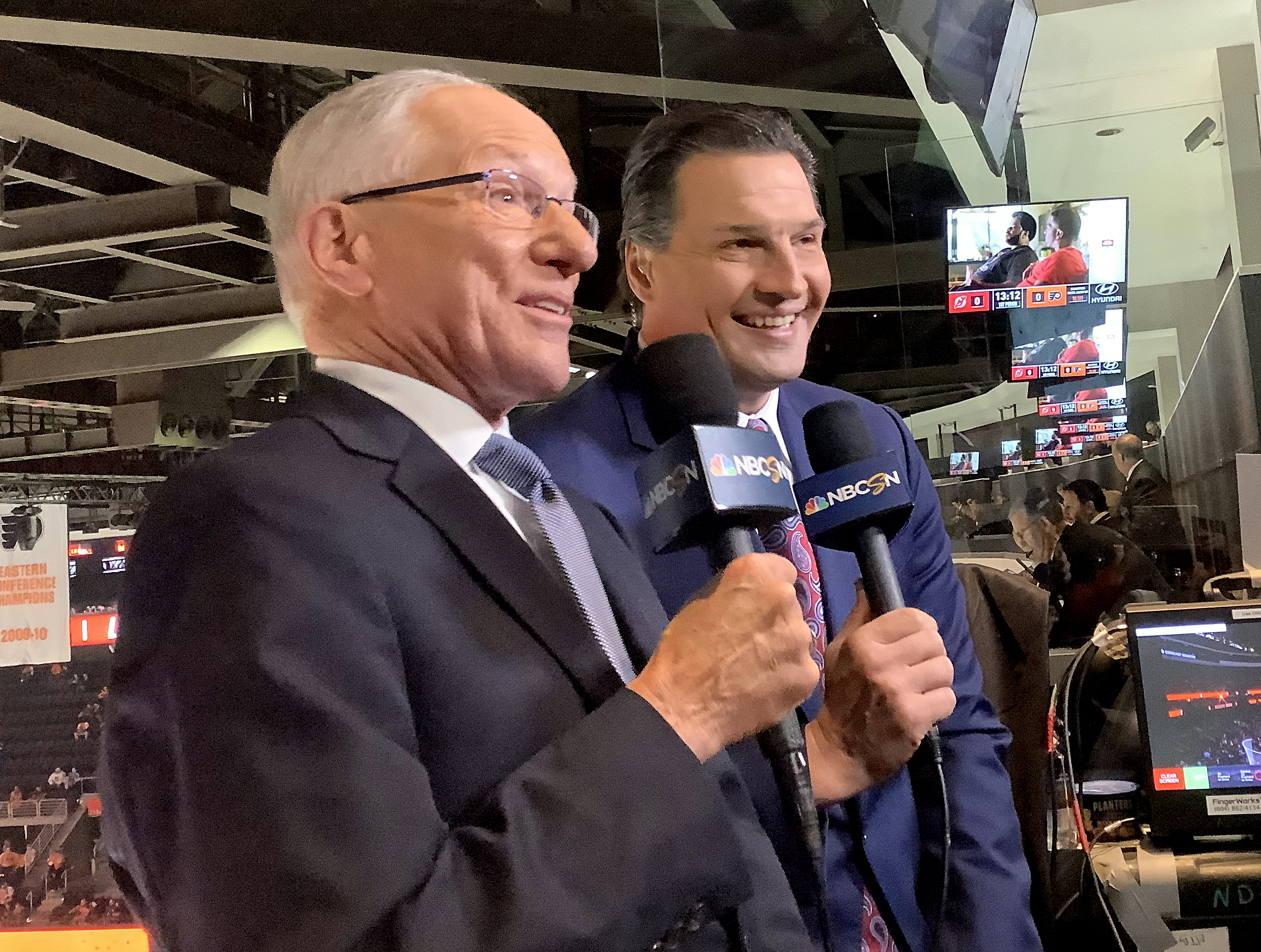
Mike Emrick and Eddie Olczyk broadcasting an NHL on NBCSN game in October 2019.

NBC did also televise the 2011 NHL Winter Classic between the Pittsburgh Penguins and Washington Capitals on January 1, 2011, from Pittsburgh. The Penguins become the first NHL team ever to play more than one outdoor game.

On April 19, 2011, NBC Sports and then Versus announced they had reached a ten-year extension (through 2020–2021) to the television contract with the National Hockey League worth nearly 2 billion dollars over the life of the contract. As part of the announcement, the chairman of NBC Sports, Dick Ebersol announced that the Versus channel would be renamed "within 90 days," in order to reflect the synergy of the two networks after the Universal-Comcast merger. The said network was renamed the NBC Sports Network on January 2, 2012. Under this new contract, the NHL would get the following from NBC:

- A rights fee of roughly US$200,000,000 per year for the combined cable and broadcast rights, nearly triple that of the previous contract.
- An annual Thanksgiving Showdown on the Friday after Thanksgiving. In 2011, it was between the Boston Bruins and Detroit Red Wings. A "Black Friday" game in 2012 between the Boston Bruins and the New York Rangers was canceled due to the 2012 NHL lockout.
- The NHL Winter Classic remaining on NBC on New Year's Day (with the 2012 and 2017 games being played on January 2).
- A national "Game of the Week".
- The annual Hockey Day in America.
- Digital rights across all platforms for any games broadcast by NBC or NBC Sports Network
- Increased coverage of Stanley Cup Playoff games (all playoff games will be aired nationally on NBC, NBC Sports Network, or if necessary, another NBC-owned network), with NBC's cable partners getting exclusive in-market rights to all games after the opening round.
- Continued sharing of the Stanley Cup Final with NBC Sports Network (NBC aired games one, two, five, six, and seven in 2012; the network will air games one, four, and if needed five, six, and seven of the 2013 Finals; a similar pattern is expected to continue in future years).

As part of the NHL's new American television contract with NBC, this will be the first time that all playoff games will air nationally in the United States on NBC and NBC Sports Network, with overflow feeds airing on CNBC, NHL Network and (for the first time since 1985) USA. American regional sports networks and broadcast television stations holding local rights to NHL teams will still carry their teams' first-round games not on NBC's broadcast network, but games from the second round onward are exclusive to one of NBC's networks.

Univision Communications handles Spanish-language television rights through a separate contract deal with the NHL.

Starting in the 2018–19 NHL season, ESPN began carrying selected out-of-market games on the ESPN+ streaming service.

== 2020s ==
=== 2021–28 (ESPN and TNT Sports) ===
In the years before the end of NBC's latest contract with the NHL, the league explored options for splitting its national broadcast rights, similar to the television deals of the NFL, NBA and Major League Baseball. This included selling packages to streaming services, aiming to maximize the value of its broadcast rights. On March 10, 2021, Disney, ESPN, and the NHL announced that a seven-year agreement was reached for ESPN to hold the first half of its new media rights beginning in the 2021–22 season;

- ESPN will hold rights to at least 25 exclusive national games per season, which are split between ESPN and ABC, and will include exclusive rights to opening night games. Select games on ESPN and all games on ABC stream on ESPN+.
- Up to 75 exclusive national games per season will be streamed exclusively on ESPN+, and will not be carried on linear television. These games will also be available to Hulu subscribers.
- ESPN+ will stream all out-of-market games, as well as on-demand versions of all nationally-televised games via NHL Power Play.
- ESPN will hold rights to All-Star Weekend, with the Players Draft airing on ESPN2, the Skills Competition airing on ESPN, and the All-Star Game airing on ABC. All events stream live on ESPN+.
- ABC and ESPN+ will hold rights to the Stadium Series.
- ESPN and ESPN+ will hold rights to the NHL entry draft.
- ESPN+ holds simulcast rights of Trade Deadline and Free Agency coverage of Canadian sports channel TSN, which ESPN owns a minority stake in.
- ESPN, ESPN2, and ABC will share coverage of the Stanley Cup playoffs, holding rights to "half" of the games in the first two rounds, and one conference final per-season. ESPN/ABC will have the first choice of which conference final series to air. The remaining half will air on TNT, TBS, and TruTV.
- Exclusive rights to the Stanley Cup Final will alternate between ABC and TNT; ESPN will have the ability to air simulcast coverage with alternate feeds on its other channels and platforms.
- ESPN2 airs a weekly studio program dedicated to the NHL, The Point (which is hosted by John Buccigross), and ESPN will hold various highlights and international rights.

On April 27, 2021, TNT Sports (Turner Sports at the time), agreed to a seven-year deal with the NHL to broadcast at least 72 games nationally on TNT and TBS. The deal will include three Stanley Cup Finals, half of the first two rounds of playoff games, one conference finals, the Winter Classic, and the Heritage Series. The deal also gives HBO Max live streaming and simulcast rights to these games as well.

The NHL's deal with ESPN is reported to bring in $400 million annually, while Turner's portion of the contract is reportedly worth $225 million per year.

The Stanley Cup Final will air on ABC in 2022, 2024, 2026, and 2028, while TNT will air the Stanley Cup Final in 2023, 2025, and 2027. In addition, the NHL Awards show will alternate between TNT and ESPN.

== American coverage policy for Stanley Cup Finals ==
- 1995 – present: National coverage (network and cable) exclusive.
- 1981 – 1994: Local coverage permitted for all games. National coverage (cable) not exclusive.
- 1976 – 1979: National coverage on syndicated networks exclusive.
- 1968 – 1975: Local coverage permitted for non-network games. National network telecasts exclusive.
