= NHL on NBC commentators =

List of commentators on American TV coverage of ice hockey

From 2006 to 2008, NBC's studio show was originally broadcast out of the rink at New York's Rockefeller Center, at the foot of NBC's offices during January and February. This allowed the on-air talent, including commentators for NHL on NBC, and their guests (often ex-players and youth hockey teams) to demonstrate plays and hockey skills. From April onwards, and during inclement weather, the studio show moved to Studio 8G inside the GE Building, where NBC produces its Football Night in America program. For the Stanley Cup Final, the show was usually broadcast on location.

Beginning in 2008, the studio show originated from the game venue. In 2012, the studio show moved to NBC Sports’ new headquarters in Stamford, Connecticut. The studio show now usually goes on the road for special events like the Winter Classic, All-Star Weekend, the Stadium Series, and the Stanley Cup Final.

== List of personalities ==
=== Full-time ===
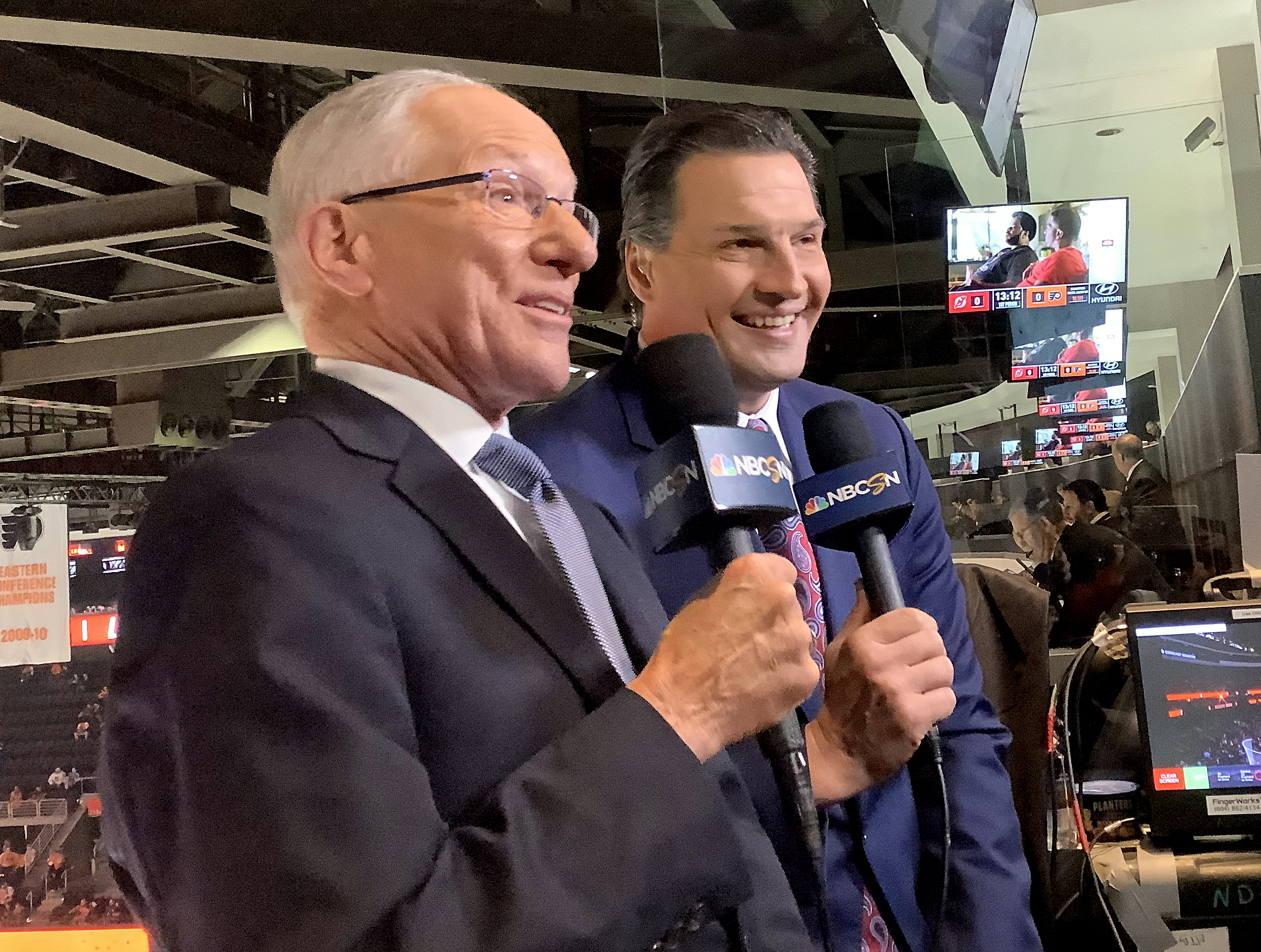
Mike Emrick and Eddie Olczyk working a game on NHL on NBCSN (October 2019)

- Kenny Albert: play-by-play (2011–2015); #2 play-by-play (2015–2020); Lead play-by-play (2021); now lead play-by-play announcer for TNT, 98.7 ESPN/WEPN 1050 (New York Rangers radio broadcasts), Fox NFL, and New York Knicks on MSG Network.
- Mike Emrick: lead play-by-play (2006–2020); contributor (2021)
- Eddie Olczyk: studio analyst (2006); lead color commentator (2007–2021); now co-lead color commentator for Root Sports Northwest (Seattle Kraken broadcasts) and lead color commentator for TNT
- Pierre McGuire: "Inside the Glass" reporter (2006–2021), studio host/analyst (2008–2011); former lead color commentator for TSN Hockey
- John Forslund: play-by-play (2011–2021); now play-by-play for Root Sports Northwest (Seattle Kraken broadcasts) and TNT
- Brian Boucher: "Inside the Glass" reporter/studio analyst (2015–2021), lead "Inside the Glass" reporter (2019–2021); now a color commentator for TNT (previously ESPN/ABC) and color commentator for NBC Sports Philadelphia (Philadelphia Flyers broadcasts)
- Liam McHugh: lead studio host (2011–2021); also lead on-site host for Football Night in America (2017–2020); now lead studio host for TNT
- Keith Jones: lead studio analyst (2011–2021); now Philadelphia Flyers President of Hockey Operations
- Kathryn Tappen: studio host and reporter (2014–2021); now reporter for Big Ten Saturday Night and TNT
- Patrick Sharp: studio analyst (2018–2021); now special advisor to hockey operations for Philadelphia Flyers (previously an analyst for TNT)
- Anson Carter: studio analyst (2012–2021); "Inside the Glass" reporter (2015); now studio analyst for TNT
- Darren Dreger: NHL insider (2014–2021); also insider for TSN Hockey
- Bob McKenzie: NHL insider (2014–2021); also insider for TSN Hockey

=== Part-time ===
- Mike Babcock: guest studio analyst (2021)
- Brendan Burke: play-by-play (2017–2021); now play-by-play for MSG Network/MSG Plus (New York Islanders broadcasts) and TNT
- Ryan Callahan: guest studio analyst (2020–2021); now color commentator and studio analyst on ESPN/ABC
- Brian Engblom: Former #2 color commentator (2011–2015); part-time (2015–2020); also color commentator for Bally Sports Sun (Tampa Bay Lightning broadcasts)
- Ahmed Fareed: fill-in studio host (2019–2021); now primary studio host for College Countdown (Football) and College Countdown (Basketball), also secondary studio host for NBA Showtime
- Ray Ferraro: studio analyst (2006–2007); "Inside the Glass" reporter (2015–2021); now lead color commentator for ESPN/ABC and fill-in ice-level analyst for Sportsnet Pacific (Vancouver Canucks broadcasts)
- Scott Hartnell: guest studio analyst (2020); also, back-up color commentator for NBC Sports Philadelphia (Philadelphia Flyers broadcasts)
- Bret Hedican: "Inside the Glass" reporter (2011–2021); now a player development analyst for the San Diego Gulls (the Anaheim Ducks' AHL affiliate); previously a color commentator for NBC Sports California (San Jose Sharks broadcasts) and TNT
- Mike Johnson: color commentator/studio analyst (2017–2021); also, color commentator for TSN Hockey
- Ben Lovejoy: guest studio analyst (2020–2021)
- Joe Micheletti: "Inside the Glass" reporter (2007, 2011–2021), color commentator (2014–2021); also, color commentator MSG Network (New York Rangers broadcasts)
- Gord Miller: play-by-play (2011–2021); now play-by-play for TSN Hockey
- A. J. Mleczko: color commentator (2018–2021); now a color commentator and studio analyst for MSG Plus (New York Islanders broadcasts) and ESPN/ABC
- Dominic Moore: guest studio analyst and color commentator (2020–2021); now a color commentator for KUPX (Utah Mammoth broadcasts); formerly an analyst at ESPN/ABC
- Kendall Coyne Schofield: color commentator (2019–2021); also playing for the United States women's national ice hockey team
- Mike Tirico: Stanley Cup Final game host and interviewer (2018–2019); studio host/play-by-play (2019–2021); now lead play-by-play announcer for NBC Sunday Night Football and the NBA on NBC, primetime host of NBC's Olympic coverage

=== NBC Sports Regional Networks personalities ===
NBC Sports Regional Networks personnel occasionally appeared on NBCSN broadcasts during the latter part of the season and the first round of the Stanley Cup playoffs.

NBC Sports California

- Randy Hahn: play-by-play (2011–present); also lead play-by-play for exclusive Sharks national regular season broadcasts
- Drew Remenda: lead color commentator (2011–2014, 2021–present)

Hahn works Stanley Cup playoff games broadcasts on TNT

NBC Sports Philadelphia

- Jim Jackson: play-by-play (2011–present)
- Brian Boucher: lead color commentator (2023–present); fill-in color commentator (2021–2023); also lead Inside the Glass reporter for TNT (formerly ESPN/ABC)
- Scott Hartnell: fill-in color commentator (2021–present)

Jackson also does Stanley Cup playoff game broadcasts on TNT

=== Other on-air staff (occasional appearances) ===
- Andy Brickley: "Inside the Glass" reporter; also lead color commentator for NESN (Boston Bruins broadcasts)
- Ken Daniels: play-by-play; also lead play-by-play for Fox Sports Detroit (Detroit Red Wings broadcasts)
- Alex Faust: play-by-play; also fill-in radio play-by-play announcer for New York Rangers and on TNT)
- Jim Fox: color commentator; also color commentator for Fox Sports West and Prime Ticket (Los Angeles Kings broadcasts)
- Butch Goring: color commentator; also color commentator for MSG Network/MSG Plus (New York Islanders broadcasts)
- Darren Pang: "Inside the Glass" reporter (2007–2021), NHL Winter Classic reporter (2008–2012); also lead color commentator for Chicago Sports Network (Chicago Blackhawks broadcasts) and #2 ice-level analyst for TNT
- Brian Hayward: color commentator/"Inside the Glass" reporter; also color commentator for Fox Sports West and Prime Ticket (Anaheim Ducks broadcasts)
- Mike Keenan: studio analyst
- Peter McNab: color commentator; also color commentator for Altitude Sports (Colorado Avalanche broadcasts)
- Daryl Reaugh: color commentator; also lead color commentator (2011–2017, 2018–present), play-by-play (2017–2018) for both TV and radio Dallas Stars broadcasts
- Rob Simmelkjaer: studio host
- Tripp Tracy: "Inside the Glass" reporter; also color commentator for Fox Sports Carolinas (Carolina Hurricanes broadcasts)
- John Walton: play-by-play; also play-by-play for Washington Capitals radio broadcasts
- Dave Goucher: play-by-play; also lead play-by-play for KMCC (Vegas Golden Knights broadcasts)
- Shane Hnidy: color commentator; also lead color commentator for KMCC (Vegas Golden Knights broadcasts) and fill-in analyst on TNT

=== Former ===
- Jamie Baker: color commentator (2014–2020)
- Dave Briggs: substitute studio host (2013–2016)
- Rob Carlin: on-site host for three Sunday afternoon games that NBC aired in February 2018, as they reduced their NHL coverage for that period during the 2018 Winter Olympics
- Bill Clement: substitute color commentator (2007–2020); studio host (2006–2007)
- Steve Coates: "Inside the Glass" reporter for NBC Sports Philadelphia simulcasts (2011–2014)
- Bob Costas: studio host (NHL Winter Classic) (2008-2012)
- Bill Cullen: studio co-host (1966 playoffs)
- Chris Cuthbert: play-by-play (2006–2007, 2014–2020); formerly play-by-play for TSN Hockey, currently play-by-play for NHL on Sportsnet
- John Davidson: lead color commentator (2006)
- Win Eliot: lead play-by-play (1966 playoffs)
- Cammi Granato: "Inside the Glass" reporter (2006), feature reporter (2007)
- Taryn Hatcher: rinkside reporter (2019–2020)
- Brett Hull: studio analyst (2007)
- Ted Lindsay: lead color commentator (1972–75)
- Bill Mazer: lead color commentator (1966 playoffs)
- Brian McFarlane: studio host (1972–75)
- Mike Milbury: lead studio analyst/"Inside the Glass" reporter (2008–2020), substitute lead color commentator (2017–2020)
- Bob Neumeier: Stanley Cup Final and substitute studio host (2006–2008)
- Bill Patrick: substitute studio host (2008; 2011–2013)
- Dan Patrick: studio host (2010–2012)
- Rick Peckham: occasional play-by-play (2011–2020); also play-by-play for Fox Sports Sun (Tampa Bay Lightning broadcasts)
- Drew Remenda: color commentator for NBC Sports California simulcasts (2011–2014)
- Jeremy Roenick: studio analyst (2010–2020), lead NHL outdoor games reporter (2014–2019)
- Tim Ryan: lead play-by-play (1972–75)
- Jim Simpson: studio co-host (1966 playoffs)
- Dave Strader: former #2 play-by-play (2006–2007, 2009–2015); part-time (2015–2017); also play-by-play for both TV and radio Dallas Stars broadcasts
- Russ Thaler: occasional studio host (2011–2014)
- Chris Therien: studio analyst (2011–2020); formerly "Inside the Glass" reporter for NBC Sports Philadelphia (Philadelphia Flyers broadcasts until 2018)

== Broadcast teams ==
=== 1966 Playoffs (broadcast as special extended editions of "NBC Sports In Action") ===
1. Win Eliot-Bill Mazer-Bill Cullen and Jim Simpson

=== 1972–75 ===
1. Tim Ryan-Ted Lindsay-Brian McFarlane

For the 1966 playoffs and 1972–75 coverage, play-by-play is listed first, followed by color commentator, and studio host or hosts. "Inside The Glass" reporters were not utilized by NBC until the 2005–06 season.

=== 2005–06 ===
1. Mike Emrick-John Davidson-Pierre McGuire
2. Dave Strader-Brian Hayward-Joe Micheletti
3. Chris Cuthbert-Peter McNab-Cammi Granato

During its first 2 seasons, NBC used 3 regular broadcast teams for its regional coverage of the NHL. For its first season, they brought in Mike Emrick and John Davidson, the lead broadcast team for NHL on Fox, to be their lead announcing pair, and added popular is Pierre McGuire was used as "Inside the Glass" reporter (the one who stands between-the-benches).

For both broadcast seasons of the NHL on NBC, the #2 team consisted of Dave Strader, Brian Hayward, and "Inside the Glass" reporter Joe Micheletti.

For the 2005–06 NHL season, the #3 broadcast team was Chris Cuthbert, Peter McNab, and "Inside the Glass" reporter Cammi Granato.

=== 2006–07 ===
1. Mike Emrick-Eddie Olczyk-Pierre McGuire
2. Dave Strader-Brian Hayward/Peter McNab-Joe Micheletti
3. Chris Cuthbert-Peter McNab/Brian Hayward-Darren Pang

For the 2006–07 NHL season, the 2nd season of the NHL on NBC, John Davidson left NBC to become the president of St. Louis Blues, so studio analyst Eddie Olczyk was permanently used with Mike Emrick and Pierre McGuire. The trio remained as NBC's lead broadcast team until 2020. Furthermore, Darren Pang was used due to Granato's son being born.

During 2006–07, the #2 and #3 broadcast teams were mixed up, due to travel constraints. An example of this is color commentators Peter McNab and Brian Hayward often switching roles during the season and playoffs.

During the season, due to Pierre McGuire's TSN commitments, a variety of "Inside the Glass" reporters have been used with the #1 team, including Joe Micheletti, Cammi Granato, and Peter McNab.

=== 2007–09 ===
Due to NBC's move to flex scheduling & only broadcasting one game a week, Only the lead team of Emrick, Olczyk, & McGuire is now used. Also, NBC has scrapped the studio-based intermission show and fired Bill Clement and Ray Ferraro. Pierre McGuire, who continues his role as the "Inside the Glass" reporter, serves as host from the game venue. Former Boston Bruins head coach Mike Milbury is the new analyst. During the Stanley Cup playoffs, NBC Sports reporters like Bob Neumeier and Bill Patrick served as a moderator for Pierre McGuire & Mike Milbury's analysis.

In this era, Darren Pang will fill in for McGuire when he has TSN commitments.

=== 2010–2021 ===
For the 2010 Stanley Cup Final, Jeremy Roenick returned as a guest analyst for the intermission reports. For games five and six on NHL on NBC, Dan Patrick was the studio host. For the 2011 Stanley Cup playoffs, Liam McHugh served as the host while Mike Milbury and Pierre McGuire returned as analysts for the intermission reports.

In the era, after NBC purchased VERSUS and renamed it NBCSN, there was generally a sharing of talent that led to Emrick, Olczyk, and McGuire calling the Sunday afternoon Game of the Week but frequently appeared on Wednesday telecasts on NBCSN. In addition, Dave Strader and Brian Engblom called Sunday night and Tuesday night games on NBCSN.

Cuthbert returned to the network and John Forslund came over from VERSUS. Frequently, a mix of Emrick, Albert, Strader, Cuthbert, and Forslund led NBC's Stanley Cup playoff crews with analysts Olczyk, McGuire, Joe Micheletti, Engblom, and Darren Pang providing analysis. TSN commentators such as Cuthbert, Gord Miller, Ray Ferraro and Mike Johnson also worked regular season and playoff games and especially helped out with the network's coverage of the NHL Draft once those rights transferred to Sportsnet in Canada.

At the start of the 2018–19 season, NBC rotated Pierre McGuire and Brian Boucher on the lead broadcast team with Mike Emrick and Eddie Olczyk. Boucher joined the lead pair for Wednesday Night Hockey early games while McGuire called the late game. McGuire, however, was still assigned to work with the lead team on single-header Wednesday Night Hockey, weekly Game of the Week broadcasts, and the 2019 Stanley Cup Final. However, as of the start of the 2019–20 season, Boucher now works with the lead team while McGuire continues to appear on other broadcasts. In addition, NBC began using U.S. women's ice hockey stars A. J. Mleczko and Kendall Coyne Schofield as game analysts on select broadcasts, and NBC even assigned Mike Tirico to call play-by-play on a few broadcasts.

Similarly, the studio show was largely a mix of NBCSN's Liam McHugh and Kathryn Tappen with analysts Mike Milbury (until his firing in 2020), Roenick (until his firing in 2020), Keith Jones and later on, Anson Carter and Patrick Sharp. Mike Tirico would occasionally substitute as a host and play-by-play announcer.

Towards the end of the NBC era – and with Milbury and Roenick's departures, Engblom moving to work full-time with the Tampa Bay Lightning, the retirement of Emrick, and the death of the #2 play-by-play man Dave Strader – the network began cycling in new talent. Brendan Burke, who eventually became the #2 play-by-play voice of the NHL on TNT and Alex Faust called several playoff games for the network. Recently retired players like Dominic Moore and Ryan Callahan were hired as color commentators and studio analysts, and A. J. Mleczko became the first woman to regularly work for an American national hockey broadcast. Former coach Mike Babcock joined as a studio analyst in the network's last season.

During the COVID-19 pandemic, NBC often had commentators call games from studios as a safety precaution, with a mix of studio and in-person work during the 2020–21 NHL season and a return to largely full in-person commentary during the postseason. Occasionally, commentators would work multiple games per day from NBC's studios in Connecticut.

NBCSN broadcast one of the final games before the pandemic suspended the season, a Wednesday Night Hockey telecast on March 11, 2020 between the San Jose Sharks and Chicago Blackhawks, with the network providing updates on how the pandemic was beginning to affect the league. Emrick, Olczyk, and Boucher called the game, the last one Emrick worked in-person at an NHL arena in his career.

During the NHL's 'bubble' Stanley Cup Playoffs in 2020, Forslund, Gord Miller, Boucher, and, until his firing, Mike Milbury worked in the league's Toronto bubble, while Albert and McGuire called games from the Edmonton bubble, with some commentators working from the studio or, in Emrick's case, from home. Emrick called the last of his record 22 Stanley Cup Finals from a home studio in Michigan, with Olczyk (both Emrick and Olczyk are cancer survivors), Boucher (working his first Stanley Cup Finals), and McGuire providing analysis and reporting in Edmonton.

In the 2020–21 season, Kenny Albert, John Forslund, and Mike Tirico rotated as the lead play-by-play voice to work with Olczyk, Boucher, and McGuire during the regular season. Subsequently, it was announced that Kenny Albert – who had been calling the conference final that Emrick's crew did not work – replaced the retiring Emrick as the lead play-by-play announcer and would join Olczyk and Boucher to call the top semifinal. Meanwhile, Forslund worked with Micheletti and McGuire on the other. In addition, McGuire joined the lead team as an on-site reporter for the Stanley Cup Finals, making him the only person to contribute to every season NBC carried the Stanley Cup, dating back to 2006, when he was on the top team with Emrick and John Davidson. During the first two rounds, Burke and Mleckzo and Faust, and Moore were the other broadcast teams, with Cuthbert having accepted the job as the voice of Hockey Night in Canada.

McHugh hosted the studio show from NBC's home base in Connecticut with Jones, Carter, and Sharp, while Tappen and McGuire worked from a setting on-site at each arena.

The two networks combined for a final broadcast on July 7, 2021. Both McHugh and Jones in the studio and Olczyk and Albert on-site in Tampa thanked several people behind the scenes before wrapping up the post-game show. Emrick, who narrated short features for the network in his retirement, was the last voice heard on NBCSN's post-game coverage to end that year's Stanley Cup Final.

=== "Inside-the-Glass" reporters used after NBC/Comcast merger beginning in 2011 ===
Main commentators for NHL on NBC & NBCSN:

1. Pierre McGuire
2. Brian Engblom
3. Darren Pang
4. Joe Micheletti
5. Darren Eliot
6. Billy Jaffe

=== 2011–2013 on NBC & NBCSN ===
1. Mike Emrick-Eddie Olczyk-Pierre McGuire
2. Dave Strader-Brian Engblom-Brian Hayward-Darren Pang
3. Kenny Albert-Joe Micheletti
4. Gord Miller-Daryl Reaugh-Pierre McGuire
5. Rick Peckham-Daryl Reaugh (2012 Stanley Cup playoffs)
6. John Forslund-Brian Hayward (2012 Stanley Cup playoffs) or Daryl Reaugh (2013 Stanley Cup playoffs)

=== 2014–15 on NBC & NBCSN ===
1. Mike Emrick-Eddie Olczyk-Pierre McGuire
2. Dave Strader-Brian Engblom
3. Kenny Albert-Joe Micheletti
4. Gord Miller-Ray Ferraro
5. Chris Cuthbert-Bret Hedican
6. John Forslund-Anson Carter
7. Randy Hahn-Jamie Baker-Bret Hedican

== See also ==
- NHL on NBC
- List of American Stanley Cup Final television announcers
