= List of NHL on ESPN personalities =

The following is the list of broadcast teams that ESPN/ABC used throughout their tenure of broadcasting NHL games.

== Broadcast teams ==
ESPN/ABC did not have fixed broadcast teams during the 1985–86 season. Sam Rosen, Ken Wilson, Jim Hughson, Dan Kelly, Mike Lange, Jiggs McDonald, Jim Kelly, Mike Emrick, and Mike Patrick handled the play-by-play, and Mickey Redmond, Bill Clement, John Davidson, Gary Dornhoefer, Phil Esposito, and Brad Park provided color commentary.

The NHL and ESPN/ABC announced a new 7-year deal beginning in the 2021–22 season.

Season	Broadcasters
1986–87	1. Ken Wilson (regular season)/Mike Emrick (playoffs)-Bill Clement; 2. Sam Rosen, Rick Peckham, or Tom Mees-John Davidson; 3. Ken Wilson-Mike Liut
1987–88	1. Mike Emrick-Bill Clement; 2. Sam Rosen-Phil Esposito
1992–93	1. Gary Thorne-Jim Schoenfeld (regular season)/Bill Clement (playoffs); 2. Tom Mees-John Davidson, Brian Engblom, or Darren Pang
1993–94	1. Gary Thorne-Bill Clement; 2. Tom Mees-John Davidson, Brian Engblom, or Darren Pang; 3. Sean McDonough-Brian Engblom; 4. Steve Levy or John Saunders-Joe Micheletti
1994–95	1. Gary Thorne-Bill Clement; 2. Tom Mees-Darren Pang; 3. Mike Goldberg-Brian Engblom; 4. Steve Levy or Sean McDonough-Mike Milbury or Bobby Taylor
1995–96	1. Gary Thorne-Bill Clement; 2. Tom Mees-Darren Pang; 3. Mike Goldberg-Brian Engblom; 4. Steve Levy-Barry Melrose or Daryl Reaugh
1996–97	1. Gary Thorne-Bill Clement; 2. Dave Strader-Darren Pang; 3. Dave Ryan or Steve Levy-Brian Engblom or Barry Melrose; 4. Dave Ryan-Bobby Taylor
1997–98	1. Gary Thorne-Bill Clement; 2. Dave Strader, Dave Ryan, or Steve Levy-Brian Engblom or Darren Pang; 3. Dave Ryan, Steve Levy, or Dave Strader-Brian Engblom or Darren Pang; 4. Dave Ryan-Brian Hayward (playoffs)
1998–99	1. Gary Thorne-Bill Clement; 2. Steve Levy-Darren Pang; 3. Dave Strader or Dave Ryan-Brian Engblom; 4. Dave Ryan-Eddie Olczyk; 5. Joe Beninati-Rick Bowness
1999–2000	1. Gary Thorne-Bill Clement; 2. Steve Levy-Darren Pang; 3. Dave Strader or Sean McDonough-Brian Engblom; 4. Jack Edwards-Brian Engblom, Craig Simpson, or Jim Schoenfeld; 5. Dave Ryan-Eddie Olczyk, Brian Engblom or Joe Micheletti; 6. Joe Beninati-Neil Smith or Tony Twist
2000–01	1. Gary Thorne-Bill Clement; 2. Steve Levy-Darren Pang; 3. Dave Strader or Sean McDonough-Brian Engblom; 4. Jack Edwards-Jim Schoenfeld; 5. Dave Ryan-Joe Micheletti; 6. Joe Beninati-Neil Smith or Tony Twist
2001–02	1. Gary Thorne-Bill Clement; 2. Steve Levy-Darren Pang; 3. Dave Strader-Brian Engblom; 4. Jack Edwards-Jim Schoenfeld; 5. Dave Ryan-Joe Micheletti; 6. Joe Beninati or Sean McDonough-Neil Smith or Tony Twist
2002–03	1. Gary Thorne-Bill Clement and John Davidson; 2. Steve Levy-Barry Melrose and Darren Pang; 3. Dave Strader-Brian Engblom; 4. Joe Beninati-Neil Smith; 5. Sean McDonough-Brian Engblom, Ray Ferraro, or Eddie Olczyk
2003–04	1. Gary Thorne-Bill Clement and John Davidson; 2. Steve Levy-Barry Melrose and Darren Pang; 3. Dave Strader-Brian Engblom; 4. Joe Beninati-Neil Smith; 5. Sean McDonough-Brian Engblom, Ray Ferraro, or Eddie Olczyk
2021–22	Opening Night: 1. Sean McDonough-Ray Ferraro (Pittsburgh-Tampa Bay); 2. John Buccigross-Brian Boucher and A. J. Mleczko (Seattle-Vegas); Rest of Season: 1. Sean McDonough-Ray Ferraro, Brian Boucher, A. J. Mleczko, Dominic Moore, and/or Cassie Campbell-Pascall; 2. Bob Wischusen-Brian Boucher, Ray Ferraro, A. J. Mleczko, Dominic Moore, Kevin Weekes, and/or Cassie Campbell-Pascall; 3. Leah Hextall or Mike Monaco-Dominic Moore, Cassie Campbell-Pascall, Kevin Weekes, Ray Ferraro, Brian Boucher, Ryan Callahan, and/or A. J. Mleczko; 4. Steve Levy or John Buccigross-Barry Melrose, Mark Messier, Chris Chelios, Ray Ferraro, A. J. Mleczko, Hilary Knight, Ryan Callahan, Dominic Moore, Kevin Weekes, and/or Cassie Campbell-Pascall; 5. Roxy Bernstein-Dominic Moore or Kevin Weekes; 6. Gord Miller-Cassie Campbell-Pascall or Dominic Moore (Playoffs only)
2022–23	Opening Night: 1. Sean McDonough-Ray Ferraro (Tampa Bay-New York Rangers); 2. Bob Wischusen-Brian Boucher (Vegas-Los Angeles); Rest of Season: 1. Sean McDonough-Ray Ferraro; 2. Bob Wischusen-Brian Boucher, Ray Ferraro, A. J. Mleczko, Dominic Moore, Cassie Campbell-Pascall, Mark Messier, and/or Chris Chelios; 3. Steve Levy or John Buccigross-Barry Melrose, Mark Messier, Chris Chelios, Ray Ferraro, Brian Boucher, A. J. Mleczko, Ryan Callahan, Kevin Weekes, and/or Dominic Moore; 4. Mike Monaco or Leah Hextall-A. J. Mleczko, Dominic Moore, Brian Boucher, Kevin Weekes, Hilary Knight, Cassie Campbell-Pascall, Ray Ferraro, and/or Ryan Callahan; 5. Roxy Bernstein or Kevin Weekes-Ryan Callahan, P. K. Subban, or Kevin Weekes; 6. Drew Carter-Kevin Weekes (NHL Big City Greens Classic only)
2023–24	Opening Night: 1. Sean McDonough-Ray Ferraro (Chicago-Pittsburgh); 2. Bob Wischusen-A. J. Mleczko (Seattle-Vegas); 3. John Buccigross-Kevin Weekes and Ryan Callahan (Nashville-Tampa Bay); Frozen Frenzy: 1. Sean McDonough-Ray Ferraro (Boston-Chicago); 2. Bob Wischusen-Ryan Callahan (Philadelphia-Vegas); 3. Mike Monaco-A. J. Mleczko (Toronto-Washington); Rest of Season: 1. Sean McDonough-Ray Ferraro; 2. Bob Wischusen-Ryan Callahan, A. J. Mleczko, Ray Ferraro, or Kevin Weekes; 3. Mike Monaco-A. J. Mleczko, Cassie Campbell-Pascall, Ray Ferraro, Kevin Weekes, or Ryan Callahan; 4. Steve Levy or John Buccigross-Mark Messier, P. K. Subban, Kevin Weekes, Ray Ferraro, A. J. Mleczko, Ryan Callahan, and/or Cassie Campbell-Pascall; 5. Drew Carter-Kevin Weekes (NHL Big City Greens Classic only); 6. Roxy Bernstein-Cassie Campbell-Pascall or Kevin Weekes
2024–25	Opening Night: 1. Bob Wischusen-A. J. Mleczko and Ray Ferraro (Chicago-Utah); 2. Mike Monaco-Ray Ferraro (St. Louis-Seattle); 3. John Buccigross-Ryan Callahan (Boston-Florida) (Note: Originally, Callahan was scheduled to work Bruins-Panthers with Sean McDonough and Emily Kaplan. However, due to Hurricane Milton making landfall in Florida, Buccigross replaced McDonough as Callahan's partner, and the duo called the game from ESPN's headquarters in Bristol, CT. Kaplan was given Opening Night off.); Frozen Frenzy: 1. Bob Wischusen-Ray Ferraro (Washington-Philadelphia); 2. Mike Monaco-Cassie Campbell-Pascall (Colorado-Seattle); 3. Roxy Bernstein-Ryan Callahan (Los Angeles-Vegas); Rest of Season: 1. Sean McDonough-Ray Ferraro; 2. Bob Wischusen-Ryan Callahan, A. J. Mleczko, Ray Ferraro, Kevin Weekes, Blake Bolden, or P. K. Subban; 3. Mike Monaco-A. J. Mleczko, Cassie Campbell-Pascall, Ryan Callahan, or Ray Ferraro; 4. Steve Levy or John Buccigross-Cassie Campbell-Pascall, A. J. Mleczko, Kevin Weekes, P. K. Subban, Ryan Callahan, or Ray Ferraro; 5. Roxy Bernstein-Cassie Campbell-Pascall, Blake Bolden, Ryan Callahan, or Ray Ferraro
2025–26	Opening Night: 1. Sean McDonough-Ray Ferraro (Pittsburgh-New York Rangers); 2. Bob Wischusen-Kevin Weekes (Chicago-Florida); 3. John Buccigross-Cassie Campbell-Pascall (Colorado-Los Angeles); Frozen Frenzy: 1. Mike Monaco-Ray Ferraro (Pittsburgh-Philadelphia); 2. Bob Wischusen-A. J. Mleczko (Washington-Dallas); 3. Roxy Bernstein-Cassie Campbell-Pascall (Los Angeles-San Jose); Rest of Season: 1. Sean McDonough-Ray Ferraro; 2. Bob Wischusen-Kevin Weekes, A. J. Mleczko, Ray Ferraro, Cassie Campbell-Pascall, or Erik Johnson; 3. Mike Monaco-A. J. Mleczko, Cassie Campbell-Pascall, Erik Johnson, Kevin Weekes, Ray Ferraro, or T. J. Oshie; 4. Steve Levy or John Buccigross-P. K. Subban, Ray Ferraro, Erik Johnson, Kevin Weekes, A. J. Mleczko, Cassie Campbell-Pascall, and/or T. J. Oshie; 5. Drew Carter-Kevin Weekes (NHL Inside Out Classic only); 6. Roxy Bernstein or John Kelly-A. J. Mleczko or Cassie Campbell-Pascall
2026–27	Opening Night: 1. Bob Wischusen-Erik Johnson (Florida-Carolina); 2. Sean McDonough-Ray Ferraro (New York Rangers-Boston); 3. Mike Monaco-Kevin Weekes (Chicago-Vegas); Rest of Season: 1. Sean McDonough-Ray Ferraro; 2. Bob Wischusen-Erik Johnson, Ray Ferraro and/or A. J. Mleczko; 3. Mike Monaco-Kevin Weekes, Ray Ferraro, or Erik Johnson; 4. Steve Levy or John Buccigross-Erik Johnson, A. J. Mleczko, Ray Ferraro, and/or Cassie Campbell-Pascall; 5. John Kelly-or Roxy Bernstein-A. J. Mleczko or Cassie Campbell-Pascall

=== Stanley Cup playoffs commentators (1986-88) ===
Year	Round	Teams	Games	Play-by-play	Color commentator(s)	Ice level reporter(s)
1986	Divisional semifinals	Philadelphia-New York Rangers	Games 4–5	Ken Wilson (Game 4); Mike Lange (Game 5)	Mickey Redmond	Brian McFarlane
1986	Divisional semifinals	Washington-New York Islanders	Game 1	Mike Lange	Bill Clement	Jim Kelly and Brian McFarlane
1986	Divisional semifinals	Montreal-Boston	Game 3	Mike Lange	Bill Clement	Jim Kelly
1986	Divisional semifinals	Minnesota-St. Louis	Game 2	Ken Wilson	Mickey Redmond	Jim Kelly
1986	Divisional finals	Washington-New York Rangers	Games 1–2, 4–6	Ken Wilson (Games 1, 6); Mike Lange (Games 2, 4); Jiggs McDonald (Game 5)	Mickey Redmond (Game 1); Bill Clement (Game 2, 4–6)	Jim Kelly
1986	Divisional finals	Montreal-Hartford	Games 3, 7	Jiggs McDonald (Game 3); Ken Wilson (Game 7)	Bill Clement	Jim Kelly
1986	Divisional finals	Edmonton-Calgary	Games 2, 4–7	Mike Lange (Games 2, 7); Jim Hughson (Games 4–6)	Mickey Redmond	Jim Kelly
1986	Conference finals	Montreal-New York Rangers	Games 1–5	Ken Wilson (Games 1, 3); Jiggs McDonald (Game 2); Mike Lange (Games 4–5)	Mickey Redmond	Brian McFarlane (Games 1, 5); Jim Hughson (Games 2–4); Jim Kelly (Game 5)
1986	Conference finals	Calgary-St. Louis	Games 1–2, 4–7	Jim Hughson (Games 1, 5); Mike Lange (Game 2); Ken Wilson (Games 4, 6); Sam Rosen (Game 7)	Bill Clement	Brian McFarlane (Game 1, 5); Jim Hughson (Games 2, 4); Jim Kelly (Game 6)
1987	Divisional semifinals	Hartford-Quebec	Game 5	Mike Emrick	Bill Clement	
1987	Divisional semifinals	Montreal-Boston	in Montreal	Mike Emrick	Bill Clement	
1987	Divisional semifinals	Philadelphia-New York Rangers	in New York City	Mike Emrick	Bill Clement	
1987	Divisional semifinals	Washington-New York Islanders	Game 7	Mike Emrick	Bill Clement	Tom Mees
1987	Divisional finals	Montreal-Quebec	Game 1	Mike Emrick	Bill Clement	
1987	Divisional finals	Philadelphia-New York Islanders	Games 2, 4–7	Mike Emrick	Bill Clement	
1987	Divisional finals	Detroit-Toronto	Games 5–7	Sam Rosen (Game 5); Tom Mees (Games 6–7)	John Davidson (Games 5–6); Bill Clement (Game 7)	
1987	Divisional finals	Edmonton-Winnipeg	Games 2–4	Rick Peckham (Game 2); Sam Rosen (in Winnipeg)	John Davidson	
1987	Conference finals	Philadelphia-Montreal	Games 1–6	Mike Emrick	Bill Clement	
1987	Conference finals	Edmonton-Detroit	Games 1–5	Ken Wilson (Games 1, 3–5); Tom Mees (Game 2)	Mike Liut (Games 1, 3–5); Bill Clement (Game 2)	
1988	Divisional semifinals	New York Islanders-New Jersey	Games 1, 3–4, 6	Mike Emrick	Bill Clement	
1988	Divisional semifinals	Washington-Philadelphia	Games 2, 5, 7	Mike Emrick	Bill Clement	
1988	Divisional finals	Montreal-Boston	Games 2, 4–5	Sam Rosen	Phil Esposito	
1988	Divisional finals	Washington-New Jersey	Games 1, 3, 6–7	Sam Rosen	Phil Esposito	
1988	Divisional finals	Detroit-St. Louis	Games 2, 5	Mike Emrick	Bill Clement	
1988	Divisional finals	Calgary-Edmonton	Games 1, 3–4	Bruce Buchanan (Game 1); Mike Emrick (in Edmonton)	Bill Clement	
1988	Conference finals	Boston-New Jersey	Games 1–7	Sam Rosen	Phil Esposito	Matt Lauer
1988	Conference finals	Edmonton-Detroit	Games 1–5	Mike Emrick	Bill Clement	

== Studio personalities ==
=== Hosts ===
- Steve Levy: Studio host (1993–2004); lead studio host (2021–present)
- John Buccigross: Studio host (1998–2004, 2021–present)

=== Analysts ===
- Mark Messier: Lead studio analyst/color commentator (2021–present)
- P. K. Subban: Lead studio analyst/color commentator (2022–present)
- T.J. Oshie: Studio analyst/color commentator (2025–present)
- Kevin Weekes: Color commentator/studio analyst (2021–present)
- A. J. Mleczko: Color commentator/studio analyst (2021–present)
- Ray Ferraro: Studio analyst (2002–2004, 2021–present); lead color commentator (2021–present)

==== Former personalities ====
- Chris Berman: Stanley Cup Finals host (2003–2004)
- Brian Boucher: Co-lead color commentator and occasional studio analyst (2021–2023)
- Scotty Bowman: Studio analyst if Detroit Red Wings missed or eliminated from Stanley Cup playoffs
- Chris Chelios: studio analyst/color commentator (2021–2023)
- Bill Clement: Studio analyst (1992–93 regular season)
- Rick DiPietro: Studio analyst (2021–2023)
- Jack Edwards: Studio host (1992–93)
- Brian Engblom: Studio analyst (1992–2004)
- E. J. Hradek: Insider (1992–2004)
- Jim Kelly: Game and studio host (1985–86)
- Hilary Knight: Studio analyst/ice-level analyst (2022–2023)
- Tom Mees: Lead studio host (1985–88, 1992–93)
- Barry Melrose: Lead studio analyst (1996–2004, 2021–2023)
- Mike Milbury: Lead studio analyst (1995)
- Dominic Moore: studio analyst/color commentator (2021–2023)
- Al Morganti: Studio analyst (1992–2004)
- Arda Ocal: Studio host (2021–2026)
- Eddie Olczyk: Studio analyst (2002–2004)
- Darren Pang: Studio analyst (1992–2004)
- Bill Patrick: Studio host
- Bill Pidto: Studio host (1995–1998)
- John Saunders: Alternate studio host (1987–88); lead studio host (1992–2004)
- Jim Schoenfeld: Lead studio analyst (1993–94); studio analyst (2000–02)
- Ryan Callahan: Color commentator/studio analyst (2021–2025)
- John Tortorella: Studio analyst (2021–2022, 2025-2026)

== Reporters ==
=== Current personalities ===
- Blake Bolden (2022–present)
- Leah Hextall (2021–present)
- Emily Kaplan (2021–present)
- Greg Wyshynski (2021–present)

=== Former personalities ===
- Erin Andrews (2004)
- Brenda Brenon (1994)
- Linda Cohn (2021–2023)
- Brian Engblom (1992–2003)
- Jim Kelly (1985–86)
- Matt Lauer (1988)
- Steve Levy (1992–2004)
- Brian McFarlane (1985–86)
- Tom Mees (1986–87, 1992–93)
- Joe Micheletti (1999–2004)
- Al Morganti (1992–2002)
- Arda Ocal (2024–2026)
- Darren Pang (1995–2004)
- Sam Ryan (2003–2004)

=== Insiders ===
- Emily Kaplan: (2017–present)
- Kevin Weekes: (2021–present)
- Greg Wyshynski: (2017–present)
- E. J. Hradek: (1992–2004)
