= Reach for the Stars (game show) =

- Genre: Game Show
- Created by: Merv Griffin
- Directed by: Gilbert Cates
- Presented by: Bill Mazer
- Announcer: Chet Gould; Wayne Howell (substitute)
- Theme music composer: Horst Jankowski
- Opening theme: "A Walk in the Black Forest" by Herb Alpert
- Country of origin: United States
- No. of episodes: 65

Production
- Production company: Merv Griffin Productions

Original release
- Network: NBC
- Release: January 2 – March 31, 1967

Reach for the Stars is an American game show which briefly aired on NBC weekday mornings at 10:00 beginning January 2, 1967 for a total of 65 episodes. The show was produced by Merv Griffin Productions at NBC's New York studios and was hosted by Bill Mazer.

== Gameplay ==
Like most games of the period, contestants played for the fulfillment of a dream via a series of trivia questions and stunts. A correct answer allowed a contestant to "reach for a star" on a game board; a wrong answer meant the loss of the star.

== Theme music ==
In a move similar to the early version of The Match Game with its Bert Kaempfert-performed theme and Eye Guess with its Al Hirt-performed theme, Reach for the Stars looked to the popular music charts of the day for its theme. The eventual theme, the Herb Alpert and the Tijuana Brass version of Horst Jankowski's A Walk in The Black Forest, had been released two years before on the Going Places album.
