= NHL on Hughes =

- Also known as: NHL '80
- Genre: NHL hockey telecasts
- Presented by: Bill Clement; Bob Cole; Brian McFarlane; Jim Craig; Gary Dornhoefer; Dick Irvin Jr.; Dan Kelly; Jiggs McDonald; Howie Meeker; Lou Nanne; Gerry Pinder; Mickey Redmond; Jim Robson; Pete Stemkowski; Scott Wahle; Dave Hodge
- Country of origin: United States
- Original language: English
- No. of seasons: 1

Production
- Production locations: Various NHL venues
- Camera setup: Multi-camera
- Running time: 180 minutes or until the game ends

Original release
- Network: Hughes Television Network
- Release: January 25 – May 22, 1980

Related
- Hockey Night in Canada; NHL on USA; NHL on CBS

NHL on Hughes is the de facto name of a TV program that broadcast National Hockey League games on the defunct independent Hughes Television Network during the 1979–80 season. The program aired under the title The NHL '80.

Hughes broadcast eight Friday night games, two Thursday night games (on March 20 and April 3, 1980), the All-Star Game, some playoff games, and the first five games of the Stanley Cup Finals (the final game, Game 6, was broadcast by CBS). Hughes' broadcasts were distributed to about 55% of the United States with a notable exception being the Florida Suncoast.

Hughes and the USA cable network technically, used CBC's Hockey Night in Canada feeds for the American coverage of the first five games of the Stanley Cup Finals. The first broadcast involved the Atlanta Flames against the Chicago Blackhawks on January 25.

== Playoff coverage ==
Round	Teams	Games	Play-by-play	Color commentator(s)
First round	Pittsburgh-Boston	Game 2		
First round	New York Rangers-Atlanta	Game 4	Jim Gordon	Bill Chadwick
Quarterfinals	Buffalo-Chicago	Game 3	Dan Kelly	Jim Craig
Quarterfinals	Montreal-Minnesota	Games 6–7	Dan Kelly	Mickey Redmond
Semifinals	Philadelphia-Minnesota	Games 1, 3–4; Game 4 used (CBC's feed)	Dan Kelly (Games 1, 3, and first half of Game 4); Jim Robson (second half of Game 4)	Bill Clement (Game 1); Pete Stemkowski (Game 3); Gerry Pinder and Howie Meeker (Game 4)
Semifinals	Buffalo-New York Islanders	Games 3, 6 (CBC's feed)	Dan Kelly (second half of both games); Jim Robson (first half of Game 3); Bob Cole (first half of Game 6)	Gerry Pinder and Howie Meeker (Game 3); Gary Dornhoefer (Game 6)

=== Stanley Cup Finals ===
Videos:

Play-by-play	Color commentator(s)
Bob Cole (Games 1–2; first half); Jim Robson (Games 3–4; first half and Game 5; second half); Dan Kelly (second half of Games 1–4, overtime in Game 1, and first half of Game 5)	Gary Dornhoefer and Dick Irvin Jr.
