= Bill Mazer =

American television and radio personality

- Born: Morris Mazer; November 2, 1920; Iziaslav, Ukraine, Soviet Union
- Died: October 23, 2013 (aged 92); Danbury, Connecticut, U.S.
- Education: University of Michigan
- Occupation: Broadcaster
- Known for: Sports Extra, "Amazin' Mazer"
- Spouse: Dora "Dutch" Sudarsky Mazer
- Children: 2 daughters, 1 son

Bill Mazer (born Morris Mazer; November 2, 1920 – October 23, 2013) was an American television and radio personality. He won numerous awards and citations, including three National Sportscasters and Sportswriters Association's Sportscaster of the Year awards for New York from 1964 to 1966. Considered a New York institution in sports reporting, Mazer was inducted into the hall of fame for the Buffalo Broadcasters Association (1999), Buffalo Baseball Hall of Fame (2000) and the National Jewish Sports Hall of Fame and Museum (1997). He is also recognized as the host of the first sports talk radio show in history that launched in March 1964 on WNBC (AM).

Mazer earned the nickname "The A-Maz-In" for his deep knowledge of sports trivia. This was made evident while hosting his WNBC radio show in the 1960s. Based on this, he wrote several sports trivia books, including Bill Mazer's Amazin' Baseball Book: 150 Years of Baseball Tales & Trivia published by Zebra Books in 1990.

== Background ==
Mazer's family left Kyiv, emigrating before his first birthday. He grew up in Brooklyn, New York. A graduate of Yeshiva University High School for Boys, he received a BA at University of Michigan for premed before being drafted. During World War II, he served the majority of his time in the Armed Forces-Air Force Transport Command in the Pacific theatre.

After returning home, he married Dora Sudarsky ("Dutch"), his pre-war sweetheart. They had three children. Their marriage lasted 50 years until Sudarsky's death from cancer on April 28, 1996. The New York Knickerbockers observed a moment of silence during their May 1, 1996 Playoff game. Mazer never remarried.

== Career ==
=== Early work ===
Mazer's broadcasting career began in 1942, broadcasting in Grand Rapids, Michigan before joining the United States Military that same year.

His career as a sportscaster began in Buffalo, New York in 1947, where he signed on as a sportscaster on WKBW. In 1947, he was also the commercial announcer on the CBS William L. Shirer Newscast, as well as the commercial announcer for the soap opera, When a Girl Marries. By 1948, he had also become the sports director for WGR radio and served as principal sports anchor for WGR-TV from the time that station signed on in 1954 through the early 1960s. Mazer dominated the airwaves in Buffalo, broadcasting the hockey and baseball Buffalo Bisons, the All-American Football Conference Buffalo Bills and Little 3 Basketball. With years of play-by-play and sports commentary in Buffalo under his belt, Mazer arrived in New York City in 1964 when WNBC (AM) went to its first all-talk format. His show was one of the pioneer examples of modern sports talk show in America.

After filling in for Hugh Downs on the NBC game show Concentration, he was given his show, Reach for the Stars, in January 1967, but the show was quickly cancelled. Mazer also filled in for segments of the long-running NBC Radio series Monitor, even hosting on occasion.

=== National sportscasting and announcing ===
He served as a color commentator and studio host, working with play-by-play announcer Dan Kelly on CBS' National Hockey League coverage from 1969 to 1970, including the Stanley Cup playoffs. Most memorably, he covered Game #4 of the 1970 Stanley Cup finals, famously won by the Boston Bruins on Bobby Orr's iconic overtime goal on May 10, 1970. Golf was another Mazer specialty on NBC, including the U.S. Open and Bing Crosby tournaments in the mid-1960s. ABC used Mazer for its regional New York football lineup in the late 1960s. Mazer also did sideline reporting for CBS coverage of the NFL in the late 1960s.

During the 1960s and 1970s, Mazer did much voice-over commercial work, from L&M Cigarettes, Kodak, Ford automobiles to Trident chewing gum, among many others.

=== WNEW-TV ===
Mazer was a sportscaster at New York's WNEW/WNYW-TV (Metromedia/Fox Channel 5) for twenty years, ending in 1991. He also co-hosted the program Sports Extra, which originally teamed him up with Lee Leonard and then later with Brian Madden (1976–78), respectively. Sports Extra is also considered to have been the first "sports wrap-up" show of its kind.

While doing sports for The 10 O'Clock News on WNEW in the late 1970s and '80s, he held a daily contest where a viewer would send in a question to "stump" Bill and would win a prize if he or she did. Usually, the submitted question was asked by anchorman John Roland.

=== WFAN (1988–1991; 2007) and WEVD (1992–2001) ===
Mazer hosted a WFAN sports show from Mickey Mantle's restaurant from 1988 to 1991, and returned to the station on June 30, 2007, to host an hour-long show from 10 to 11 AM during the station's 20th-anniversary celebration and reunion weekend. He was also a morning talk show host on WEVD, where he expanded to a comprehensive liberal talk format from 1992 to 2001. The show ended when WEVD was optioned to ABC's ESPN division and became sports station WEPN.

He appeared on the cable TV show The Leon Charney Report, as well as minor parts in movies such as Eyewitness, Raging Bull and appearing in episodes of ESPN SportsCentury as an expert on sport figures including Gordie Howe, Lawrence Taylor and Mickey Mantle.

=== WVOX-AM (2001–2009) ===
Following his departure from WEVD in 2001, Mazer launched an afternoon interview program on WVOX in New Rochelle, New York from 3–6 PM EST with his son, Arnie Mazer, serving as producer. His last show on WVOX was aired on August 3, 2009, ending his tenure at the station after nearly eight years.

=== Death (2013) ===
Mazer's death was reported on October 23, 2013, at the age of 92. He died at a hospital in Danbury, Connecticut.

== Bibliography ==
- Sports Trivia:
  - Mazer, Bill (1966). The Sports Answer Book: from Bill Mazer's NBC Challenge round. Grosset & Dunlap. ISBN 0448054388.
  - Mazer, Bill (1969). The Answer Book Of Sports. Grosset & Dunlap. ISBN 0448033283.
  - Mazer, Bill (1982). The New Answer Book of Sports: Answers to Hundreds of Questions about the World of Sports. Grosset & Dunlap. ISBN 0448044749.
  - Mazer, Bill; Fischler, Stan (1981). Amazin Bill Mazer's Football Trivia Book. Warner Books. ISBN 0446907855.
  - Mazer, Bill; Fischler, Stan (1981). Amazin Bill Mazer's Baseball Trivia Book. Grand Central. ISBN 0446917842.
  - Mazer, Bill; Fischler, Stan; Fischler, Shirley (1990). Bill Mazer's Amazin Baseball Book: 150 Years of Tales and Trivia from Baseball's Earliest Beginnings Down to the Present Day. Kensington Publishing Corporation. ISBN 0821729470.

Preceded by First; Stu Nahan	American network television color commentator (with RKO General's Emile Francis); 1966; 1969-1970	Succeeded by Stu Nahan; Jim Gordon
Preceded by First	Lead color commentator, NHL on NBC; 1966	Succeeded by Ted Lindsay (in 1972)
