= Bob Wolff =

American sportscaster (1920–2017)

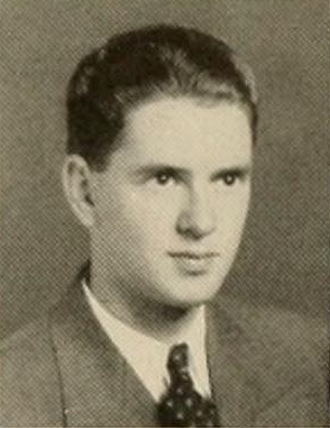
- Wolff pictured c. 1941 at Duke University
- Born: Robert Alfred Wolff; November 29, 1920; New York City, New York, U.S.
- Died: July 15, 2017 (aged 96); South Nyack, New York, U.S.
- Education: Duke University
- Occupation: Sportscaster
- Years active: 1939–2017
- Spouse: Jane Louise Hoy (m. 1945)
- Children: Three (including Rick Wolff)

Robert Alfred Wolff (November 29, 1920 – July 15, 2017) was an American radio and television sportscaster.

He began his professional career in 1939 on CBS in Durham, North Carolina while attending Duke University. He was the radio and TV voice of the Washington Senators from 1947 to 1960, continuing with the team when they relocated and became the Minnesota Twins in 1961. In 1962, he joined NBC-TV.

In his later years, Wolff was seen and heard on News 12 Long Island, on MSG Network programming, and doing sports interviews on the Steiner Sports' Memories of the Game show on the YES Network.

== Personal life ==
Wolff was born in New York City; he was the son of Estelle (Cohn), a homemaker, and Richard Wolff, a professional engineer. He was a graduate of Duke University with Phi Beta Kappa and Omicron Delta Kappa honors. Wolff served in the U.S. Navy as a supply officer in the Pacific during World War II, ending his service as a lieutenant.

He was a longtime resident of South Nyack, New York. His son Rick Wolff was an author, radio host for WFAN, and former baseball player and coach.

== National broadcasting work ==
Bob Wolff was the longest-running sports broadcaster in television and radio history. He is a recipient of the Ford C. Frick Award from the Baseball Hall of Fame and the Curt Gowdy Media Award from the Basketball Hall of Fame. Wolff was also honored with induction into Madison Square Garden's Walk of Fame, the National Sportscasters and Sportswriters Hall of Fame, Sigma Nu fraternity Hall of Fame, and many others.

Wolff was a professional broadcaster for nine decades. Seen and heard on two ESPN TV specials in 2008, he had been on the Madison Square Garden Network since 1954 and on Cablevision's News 12 Long Island since 1986.

Wolff became the pioneer TV voice of the Washington Senators in 1947 and moved with the team to Minnesota in 1961. In 1962 he joined NBC television as the play-by-play man on their Game of the Week, where he worked until 1965.

Also heard on Mutual radio's Game of the Day, Wolff was selected to be a World Series broadcaster in 1956 and that year called Don Larsen's perfect game across the country on Mutual and around the world on Armed Forces Radio. He also was on NBC Radio for the World Series in 1958 and 1961.

Wolff was seen and heard doing play-by-play on all the major TV networks. Another of his classic broadcasts was the NY Giants / Baltimore Colts 1958 NFL Championship Game called, "The Greatest Game Ever Played". On the collegiate scene, he broadcast the Rose Bowl, Sugar Bowl, Gator Bowl, and many others. Wolff was the television play-by-play voice of the Detroit Pistons for multiple seasons.

Wolff was also an announcer for the Westminster Kennel Club Dog Show, the National Horse Show, the Garden's college and pro basketball and hockey games, men and women's tennis, track and boxing events as well as gymnastics and bowling. He did soccer games for the old Tampa Bay Rowdies.

== New York Knicks and New York Rangers ==
Wolff became known regionally as television's play-by-play voice for eight teams in five different sports – the New York Knicks and Detroit Pistons of the NBA as well as the New York Rangers of the NHL, the Washington Senators/Minnesota Twins of MLB, the Baltimore Colts, Washington Redskins and Cleveland Browns of the NFL, and soccer's Tampa Bay Rowdies of the initial North American Soccer League.

He was one of the very few American play-by-play announcers to have covered each of the four major team sports leagues as well as soccer, with Dale Arnold being another, having called games of all of Boston's major sports teams: the Bruins, Celtics, Red Sox, Patriots, and Revolution.

For many years Wolff was the play-by-play telecaster for all events originating from Madison Square Garden.

His broadcast partner with the Knicks for many years was Cal Ramsey.

== Memorable calls ==
In addition to broadcasting Don Larsen's perfect World Series game and the Colts' overtime championship title win over the New York Giants, Wolff called Jackie Robinson's last major league hit that won Game 6 of the 1956 World Series. He was also the TV voice of the New York Knicks' championships in 1970 and in 1973.

== Death ==
Wolff died on July 15, 2017, at his home in South Nyack, New York, at the age of 96.

| Preceded by Lindsey Nelson | Lead play-by-play announcer, Major League Baseball on NBC; 1962–1964 | Succeeded by Curt Gowdy |
| Preceded by First | Stanley Cup Final American network television play-by-play announcer (with NBC's Win Elliot); 1966 | Succeeded by Stu Nahan |
