= Jim Kelly (sportscaster) =

American sportscaster

Jim Kelly is an American sportscaster who has worked for ESPN and CBS Sports.

== Early career ==
A native of Toledo, Ohio, Kelly attended the University of Toledo, where he played ice hockey and was named Rookie of the Year in 1965. That same year he began calling hockey games for WMHE-FM. He worked at various stations throughout Ohio from 1965 to 1970 and from 1970 to 1974 he covered golf tournaments for Golf Network, Inc., which was heard on the Mutual and the NBC Radio networks.

== CBS ==
Kelly worked for CBS and CBS Radio from 1974 to 1985. His assignments included calling golf for the PGA Tour on CBS and PGA Tour on CBS Radio, football for the NFL on CBS and NFL on CBS Radio, and basketball for the NBA on CBS, as well as golf, track and field, bowling, and horse racing. He hosted the Sports World Roundup on CBS Radio, CBS Sports Saturday and CBS Sports Sunday on CBS Television, served as sports anchor for the CBS Morning News.

From 1978 to 1982 Kelly also worked as a sports anchor for WCAU, where he won an Eclipse Award in 1980 for local horse racing coverage. In July 1983, he became a sports anchor at WNEV-TV in Boston. He left the station that October in a "mutual decision" between him and WNEV management. Also in 1985, he was the TV voice of the Villanova Wildcats football team on WGBS TV 57 in Philadelphia.

== ESPN ==
From 1985 to 2002, Kelly worked at ESPN. Here he covered golf, college football, Thoroughbred racing, the NHL, college basketball, the America's Cup, tennis, and bowling. He won a CableAce Award for his coverage of the 1987 America's Cup.

== Later career ==
After leaving ESPN, Kelly moved to CNBC, where he called the Senior PGA Tour.
