= NHL on CBS =

American television series

- Genre: Live sports telecast
- Directed by: Bob Dailey; Sandy Grossman
- Presented by: Bud Palmer; Fred Cusick; Brian McFarlane; Jim Gordon; Stu Nahan; Dan Kelly; Bill Mazer; Phil Esposito; Harry Howell; Dick Stockton; Tim Ryan; Lou Nanne
- Country of origin: United States
- Original language: English
- No. of seasons: 4 (1956–1960 version); 6 (1967–1972 version); 2 (1979–1980 version); 12 (total)

Production
- Producers: Bill Creasy; Charles H. Milton III
- Production locations: Various NHL arenas (game telecasts)
- Cinematography: George Graffeo; Harold Hoffman; Bob Jamieson; Sig Meyers
- Camera setup: Multi-camera
- Running time: 210 minutes or until game ended (inc. adverts)
- Production company: CBS Sports

Original release
- Network: CBS
- Release: January 5, 1957 – March 19, 1960
- Release: December 30, 1967 – May 11, 1972
- Release: February 10, 1979 – May 24, 1980

Related
- CBS Sports Spectacular

The NHL on CBS was a presentation of National Hockey League (NHL) games on CBS in the United States. It aired in several variations from the 1950s to 1980.

== New York Rangers games on WCBS (1945–1948) ==
CBS' affiliation with the National Hockey League technically goes as far back as the 1945–46 season, when its flagship station, New York's WCBW (later WCBS) televised New York Rangers games through the 1947–48 season. Bob Edge provided the commentary during the first two seasons and Win Elliot for the final season, when WCBW officially became WCBS. The hockey telecasts from this era only used two cameras.

The commercial spots for Knox Hats were done and aired live from a small studio elsewhere in Madison Square Garden. They required a considerable amount of rehearsal with a four-way hook-up connecting the live commercial, Win Elliot's cage, the CBS studio, and the Garden's control room. All of this necessitated instantaneous cueing by director Herbert Bayard Swope Jr. The commercials from the Garden's other two sponsors, Ford and Maxwell House were decidedly less complicated to produce. For instance, the Ford commercials were exclusively done by film from the CBS studio.

== 1956–1960 NHL Game of the Week ==
CBS broadcast its Saturday afternoon National Hockey League "Game of the Week" program starting in the 1956–57 season to 1959–60 season. Bud Palmer served as the play-by-play announcer, while Fred Cusick did color commentary and interviews for the first three seasons. In 1959–60, Cusick moved over to play-by-play while Brian McFarlane came in to do the color commentary and interviews. McFarlane was originally banned by American Unions in early January 1960 from working the telecasts, as they revoked his card. The pregame and intermission interviews were done on the ice, with the interviewer on skates. No playoff games were televised during this period, and all broadcasts took place in one of the four American arenas at the time.

During the 1956–57 season, CBS broadcast 10 games on Saturday afternoons, starting on January 5, 1957. The ratings were deemed good enough that the following season saw the slate expanded to 21 games, and 20 games for the 1958–59 season. The network continued airing games on Saturday afternoons through March 19, 1960. CBS ceased telecasting the NHL nationally when it cancelled its contract on July 22, 1960. CBS was generally happy with viewer ratings for its NHL Game of the Week. However, only showing the same four American teams, without the Toronto Maple Leafs or Montreal Canadiens willing to play Saturday afternoons in the United States, caused viewership to drop by 1960 and was the reason the network did not renew its TV contract. The four American franchises–at the time consisting of the Boston Bruins, the Chicago Black Hawks, the Detroit Red Wings, and the New York Rangers–each received US$7,000 per game. This new revenue stream was not shared with the players as they received absolutely no money from the television deal. In October 1957, the nascent NHL Players Association filed a lawsuit against the league's ownership and won an out-of-court settlement whereby James Norris, Jr. and Arthur Wirtz agreed to pay money into the players’ pension fund.

== 1967–1972 contract ==
In 1963–64, CBS offered to broadcast an NHL Game of the Week on Saturdays during the National Football League season. By the winter, CBS would move the Game of the Week to Sundays in the same time slot. Ultimately, the NHL rejected the idea, saying it would cause too many scheduling and travel problems. The league was especially worried about a game from Montreal or Toronto being played on a Saturday afternoon (and not on Saturday night to accommodate CBC Television), and teams having to play an early afternoon game on Sunday after playing a game the previous night.

=== Coverage ===
For six seasons, from 1966–67 through 1971–72, CBS aired a game each week between mid-January and early-mid May in every season, mainly on a Sunday afternoon, including playoffs. Each American-based franchise was paid US$100,000 annually for the first two years of the initial contract and $150,000 for the third. From 1968–69 through 1971–72, the intermission studio was called "CBS Control," just like with its NFL coverage.

Due to prior programming commitments, CBS did not broadcast regular season games during the 1966–67 season, so that portion of the package was subleased to RKO General, which syndicated eight regular-season games to some cities, including the four U.S. cities that then had NHL clubs and the six U.S. cities that would gain new teams in the 1967 expansion. During the 1967 playoffs, CBS was scheduled to broadcast the April 8 game between the New York Rangers and Montreal Canadiens. However, an AFTRA strike forced the cancellation of the telecast. The strike itself ultimately ended two days later.

CBS started its weekly 1967–68 coverage with the opening game (the Philadelphia Flyers vs. Los Angeles Kings) at The Forum in Inglewood, California on December 30. Then after three more Saturday afternoons, CBS switched to covering Sunday afternoon games beginning on January 28 for the next 10 weeks. On March 10, 1968, CBS broadcast a game at Chicago Stadium between Toronto and Chicago. In a precursor to the "Heidi fiasco" on NBC a few months later, CBS decided that the game was over, the Hawks leading 3–0 with 50 seconds left, and went to a children's movie called The Goalkeeper Also Lives on Our Street.

Due to another strike by AFTRA (which resulted in the cancellation of a New York Rangers-Montreal broadcast last year), CBS started its playoff coverage with a CBC tape of the previous night's Boston-Montreal game. On April 13, CBS started its three-week-long weekend afternoon Stanley Cup coverage, ending with the St. Louis-Montreal game 4 on May 11. For the playoffs, Jim Gordon worked play-by-play, and Stu Nahan worked color commentary. During the regular season, the pair alternated roles each week. For instance, Gordon worked play-by-play on December 30 while Nahan worked play-by-play the next week.

In 1968–69, CBS broadcast 13 regular season Sunday afternoon games and five Stanley Cup playoff games. Dan Kelly did play-by-play while Bill Mazer did color commentary and intermission interviews.

In 1970, Pat Summerall and then Boston Bruins' television announcer Don Earle did a short post-game segment from inside the team's dressing room at the end of CBS' coverage of the fourth (and what turned out to be the final game) of the 1970 Stanley Cup Final. WSBK-TV, which was the Bruins' television flagship at the time, simulcast the CBS coverage and did a longer post-game locker-room segment after CBS' coverage ended. After Bobby Orr scored the championship-winning goal after just 40 seconds, so the story went, Summerall turned to Bobby's father, Doug Orr (who was reportedly, too nervous to go back to his seat from the Bruins' dressing room for the start of overtime) and yelled over the crowd in the stands above "Mr. Orr, your son has scored and Boston has won the Stanley Cup!" Doug Orr is said to have told Summerall, "I know Boston scored, but we didn't see it! What makes you think my son scored?" Summerall supposedly replied, "Because they wouldn't be yelling this loudly if Esposito had scored!"

On January 31, 1971, CBS was scheduled to carry a game between the Boston Bruins and St. Louis Blues, a rematch of the 1970 Final. The game was to begin at 2 p.m. Eastern Time, but NASA announced that the Apollo 14 lunar-landing mission would be launched that afternoon at 3:23 p.m. Eastern Time. CBS decided to air the first period of the game live, then switch to news coverage once the first period ended (at approximately 2:30 p.m. Eastern Time). At about 4:30 p.m. Eastern Time, after the launch coverage was due to end, CBS would show the second and third periods of the game on tape delay. But the launch was delayed for over a half-hour, and after the launch took place, CBS had no time to show the rest of the game on tape. The theme music that CBS employed during this period bore similarities to the song "Sounds" by Hot Butter.

The network showed weekend afternoon playoff games; the same pattern continued through the 1971–72 season. CBS did manage to televise the 1971 Stanley Cup Final clincher on a Tuesday night and the 1972 Stanley Cup Final clincher on a Thursday night. In 1971, CBS was not scheduled to broadcast Game 7 of the Stanley Cup Final but showed the prime time contest (the first ever occurrence of an NHL game being nationally televised in prime time in the United States) between the Montreal Canadiens and Chicago Black Hawks after fans reportedly swamped switchboards at network headquarters in New York City asking that the seventh game be televised. Ironically, the game was not telecast by CBS' Chicago owned-and-operated station WBBM-TV, nor on CBS affiliates in most of Illinois, and parts of Indiana, Wisconsin and Iowa, due to Blackhawks' owner Arthur M. Wirtz policy of not telecasting home games. While Dan Kelly once again handled all play-by-play work, Jim Gordon replaced Bill Mazer on the role Mazer previously did in 1970–71. For the CBS' Stanley Cup Final coverage during this period, a third voice was added to the booth (Phil Esposito in 1971 and Harry Howell in 1972).

One trivial note, however: on January 23, 1972, Jim Gordon was not in Boston for the Buffalo-Boston game. Therefore, Dick Stockton filled in and did the game with Dan Kelly. Stockton, who did some work for The NFL on CBS, was also at the time a sports anchor for WBZ-TV in Boston, which ironically was at the time an NBC affiliate (WBZ-TV switched from NBC to CBS on January 2, 1995, after its parent company Westinghouse invested in and later purchased CBS, making WBZ an owned-and-operated station of the network in September 1995 which it has remained as since).

During the 1972 Stanley Cup Final between the Boston Bruins and New York Rangers, CBS took a rather calculated risk in not televising the Game 5 match on May 9 (CBS aired regular programming, including the original Hawaii Five-O in that period on that Tuesday night). This was even though Game 5 was a potential clincher with the Bruins up 3–1 on the Rangers. CBS ultimately lucked out (since the Rangers won Game 5 3–2), and televised the clincher (Game 6) on Thursday night, May 11.

After CBS lost the American television rights to NBC following the 1971-72 season (CBS was paying less than $2 million a year and NBC jumped to $5.3 million), the network covered the inaugural season of the World Hockey Association. The WHA's TV deal permitted it to sell week‐night games to other networks (CBS meanwhile, would show games on Sunday afternoons in addition the all-star game and playoffs). In addition, the WHA also sold a $3‐million package to Canada. On January 7, 1973, CBS aired its first WHA game between the Minnesota Fighting Saints and Winnipeg Jets live from the new St. Paul Civic Center with Ron Oakes, Gerry Cheevers, and Dick Stockton announcing.

==== About the 1967 NHL expansion ====
CBS' second go-around with the NHL came at just about the time when the NHL's Original Six franchises were to be joined by the league's first expansion class of 1967–68. Although the San Francisco Bay Area was not considered a particularly good hockey market, the terms of a new television agreement with a U.S. network (ultimately CBS) called for two of the expansion teams to be located in California. Hence, the California Seals and Los Angeles Kings joined the National Hockey League in an attempt to get a better TV deal, given that two large West Coast television markets would have NHL clubs (the Seals were renamed the Oakland Seals during their first season and then were rechristened the California Golden Seals when purchased by Charlie O. Finley in 1970–71). CBS was hoping that they would grow with the NHL by persuading them to go coast-to-coast (Montreal to Los Angeles) in a similar fashion for which they had grown with the National Football League (beginning in 1956). In 1967, Bill Schonely did West Coast National Hockey League coverage for CBS.

==== Memorable moments ====
Perhaps, the most memorable moment came on Mother's Day of 1969–70 (May 10), when Bobby Orr's winning goal in overtime of Game 4 of the Stanley Cup Final gave his Boston Bruins their first Stanley Cup Championship since 1941, as they swept the St. Louis Blues at the old Boston Garden. Immediately upon scoring, Orr was sent flying by St. Louis defenceman Noel Picard. The "flight" was captured by a news photographer and is one of the iconic images in the history of sports. In 1999, that goal was voted the greatest moment in NHL history by a panel of sportswriters who cover the league's clubs regularly.

The most commonly seen video clip of Bobby Orr's "flight" is the American version of the broadcast on CBS as called by Dan Kelly. This archival clip can be considered a rarity, since about 98% of the time, any surviving kinescopes or videotapes of the actual telecasts of hockey games from this era usually emanate from CBC's coverage. According to Dick Irvin Jr.'s book My 26 Stanley Cups (Irvin was in the CBC booth with Danny Gallivan during the 1970 Stanley Cup Final), he was always curious why even the CBC typically uses the CBS replay of the Bobby Orr goal (with Dan Kelly's commentary) instead of Gallivan's call. The explanation that Irvin received was that the CBC's master tape of the game (along with others) was thrown away to clear shelf space at the network.

The clip exists because WSBK-TV in Boston, then an independent station, was the television flagship of the Boston Bruins. WSBK had a weekly program during the season showing highlights of the previous week's games. WSBK got permission from CBS to simulcast the game to tape the network's telecast and use highlights from that for next week's show. WSBK decided to show the entire (however brief) overtime session in the final 1969-70 edition (aired on May 17, 1970) of Bruins Highlights, as well as in Boston Bruins: World Champions, an hour-long documentary featuring highlights of the team's 1969–70 season and Stanley Cup win. Coincidentally, WSBK is now owned by CBS, run as a sister station to WBZ-TV (formerly owned by Westinghouse Broadcasting as an NBC affiliate).

On May 24, 1980, in Game 6 of the Stanley Cup Final between the New York Islanders and Philadelphia Flyers, Bobby Nystrom scored the game-winner at 7:11 of overtime on national television throughout the United States to secure the first Stanley Cup in Islanders' history. Nystrom was part of the first NHL team (1979-80 New York Islanders) to win a Stanley Cup with Europeans on its roster.

== As part of The CBS Sports Spectacular (1976 and 1979–1980) ==
=== Super Series '76 ===
On January 4, 1976, CBS decided to televise the Soviet Wings/Buffalo Sabres Super Series game nationally. They likely did not expect very many viewers (except those in and near Buffalo and "rink rats" elsewhere) to watch as the game went head to head with the AFC Championship Game on NBC. The game also had to be over by 3:30 p.m. EST so that CBS is ready to broadcast the pregame for the NFC Championship Game. So to save two minutes, they cut "O Canada" much to the dismay of those attending at Buffalo Memorial Auditorium.

The game did extend past 3:30 p.m. Eastern time, so CBS ended the telecast seconds after the final buzzer went off, allowing CBS to air as much of an abbreviated NFL Today pregame show before the NFC Championship game as possible.

=== 1979 Challenge Cup ===
1978–79's Challenge Cup replaced the All-Star Game. It was a best-of-three series between the NHL All-Stars against the Soviet Union national squad. In the United States, Game 2, which was held on a Saturday afternoon, was shown on CBS as part of CBS Sports Spectacular. The network refused to expand CBS Sports Spectacular to carry the game in full so instead, the show came on during the first intermission, showed taped highlights of the first period and then showed the second period live, then showed the third period on tape later. The lead-in to Sports Spectacular was The World's Strongest Man.

The network, the show, and their sponsors had a problem with the rink board advertising that the NHL sold at Madison Square Garden, and refused to allow them to be shown on television. As a result, CBS viewers were unable to see the far boards above the yellow kickplate, and could only see players' skates when the play moved to that side of the ice. Games 1 and 3 were shown on the NHL Network, where the advertising was no problem.

Dan Kelly and Lou Nanne were the commentators while Dick Stockton served as the host.

=== 1980 Stanley Cup Final ===
CBS only aired one other NHL game following Game 2 of the 1979 Challenge Cup. That would take place on May 24, 1980, with Game 6 of the Stanley Cup Final between the Philadelphia Flyers and the New York Islanders. CBS was mainly influenced by the United States men's Olympic hockey team's surprise gold medal victory (dubbed "The Miracle on Ice") in Lake Placid several months prior. CBS agreed to pay $37 million to broadcast the sixth game. In return, the NHL happily moved the starting time from prime time to the afternoon. Preempting CBS Sports Spectacular, the Saturday afternoon game was the first full American network telecast of an NHL game since Game 5 of the 1975 Stanley Cup Final aired on NBC. As previously mentioned, when CBS broadcast Game 2 of the 1979 Challenge Cup, it was only seen on CBS for the third period.

Game 6 was won in overtime by the host Islanders, which captured the first of their four consecutive Stanley Cups. By this time, Dan Kelly, did play-by-play for the first and third periods as well as overtime, was joined by former NHL on NBC commentator, Tim Ryan, who did play-by-play only for the second period. In addition, Minnesota North Stars general manager Lou Nanne was the color commentator throughout the game.

81% of CBS' affiliates reportedly carried Game 6. WTVT out of Tampa, Florida, aired reruns of Ironside, Adam-12, and The Life and Times of Grizzly Adams instead of the game.

Game 6 pulled a 4.4 rating on CBS. In the New York area, the game's rating and share were 10.2 and 37 respectively. Meanwhile, in Chicago, the respective ratings and share were 1.6 and 6. In Los Angeles, where CBS' telecast started at 11 a.m. local time, the game drew a respective 2.4 rating and 10 share.

After the game ended, except for its owned-and-operated stations in New York City and Philadelphia, CBS discontinued the telecast and went to a previously scheduled golf telecast. New York and Philadelphia viewers saw a post-game show before the network joined the very end of the golf broadcast. Given that the game went into overtime, CBS cut away from hockey during the intermission between the end of regulation and the start of overtime to present ten minutes of live golf coverage, with the golf announcers repeatedly mentioning that the network would return to hockey in time for the start of sudden-death.

As previously mentioned, Game 6 of the 1980 Stanley Cup Final turned out to be the last NHL game (to date) to be televised on CBS. It was also the last NHL game on American network television until NBC televised the 1990 All-Star Game.

== Failed 1994–95 bid ==
After Fox outbid CBS for the rights to the package of National Football League (NFL) games it had held for decades (and losing Major League Baseball after the league opted to launch its ill-fated The Baseball Network effort), CBS entered the bidding to regain the NHL rights beginning in the 1994–95 season, only to again be outbid by Fox, which agreed to pay US$155 million for the five-year broadcast contract.

Incidentally, during the 1990s, CBS had the American broadcast television rights to the Winter Olympics (1992, 1994 and 1998). The network used Mike Emrick (1992 and 1994) and Sean McDonough (1998) on play-by-play for the ice hockey coverage, John Davidson (all three Olympics) and Mike Eruzione (1992 and 1998) on color commentary, and Darren Pang as the ice-level reporter (1998). Emrick would however, serve as the play-by-play announcer for the women's hockey coverage in 1998 (the first time that women competed in Olympic hockey) alongside color commentators Joe Micheletti and Digit Murphy and ice-level reporter Ellen Weinberg.

In 2010, CBS Sports president Sean McManus said regarding the prospects of the NHL returning to CBS in the foreseeable future, "It's a great property, but with our commitment to golf and college basketball, there just isn't room on our schedule." In October 2026, CBS's current parent company Paramount Skydance acquired Warner Bros. Discovery, one of the NHL's two current national rightsholders via TNT. It was reported that Skydance was considering the possibility of moving or simulcasting selected TNT Sports programming on CBS—such as TNT's Stanley Cup final coverage in 2027—although the ability to do so may be limited by WBD carriage agreements guaranteeing exclusive carriage of certain events on the channel.

== NHL on CBS' owned-and-operated television stations ==
Team	Stations	Years
New York Rangers	WCBW 2 (later WCBS-TV)	1946–1948
Pittsburgh Penguins	KDKA-TV 2	1990–1997

Records
Preceded by None	NHL network broadcast partner in the United States; 1956–1960	Succeeded by None
Preceded by NBC	NHL network broadcast partner in the United States; 1966–1972	Succeeded by NBC
Preceded by NHL Network	NHL network broadcast partner in the United States (with Hughes); 1980	Succeeded by NBC (1990)
