= NHL on RKO General =

Syndicated package of National Hockey League games from 1966 to 1967

NHL on RKO General relates to a small, syndicated network of stations owned by RKO General which broadcast National Hockey League games.

== Background ==
In the United States, the clinching game of the 1966 Stanley Cup Finals on the evening of Thursday, May 5 aired on RKO General's stations, such as WOR-TV in New York City and WHCT in Hartford, Connecticut. Bob Wolff, who at the time did play-by-play for New York Rangers games seen on WOR, called the game that night with Emile Francis.

Although the TV listings page of the May 5, 1966 edition of the Boston Globe indicated that RKO-owned WNAC-TV in Boston would not carry the game, the then-ABC-affiliated station did clear the broadcast at the last minute.

The following season, CBS won U.S. network television rights to weekend-afternoon regular-season games as well as weekend playoff games. Due to other programming commitments, the 1966-67 regular-season games were subleased to RKO General, which aired a series of Sunday afternoon broadcasts at 4 p.m. Eastern Time during the last eight weeks of the regular season, starting on February 12, 1967.

Some regular-season games were blacked out in the cities where they were played. For example, the March 26, 1967 game between the Boston Bruins and Montreal Canadiens in Boston was not televised on any station in the Boston area.

== Announcing crews and combinations ==
- Jim Gordon/Lloyd Pettit
- Win Elliott/Stu Nahan
- Fred Cusick/Jim Gordon
- Fred Cusick/Win Elliot
- Jim Gordon/Stu Nahan

== History of NHL coverage on RKO stations ==
- New York City: Independent station WOR-TV acquired local broadcast rights for the New York Rangers in 1965. The station, which was sold in 1987 and became WWOR-TV, lost the Rangers in 1989 when the team became cable-exclusive to the MSG Network. While WOR/WWOR broadcasts of Rangers' games were generally away games, mainly on Saturday nights, the station broadcast on November 27, 1965 the Rangers' home game against the Chicago Blackhawks on a few hours' tape delay. WOR-TV claimed that this game was the first NHL contest to ever be broadcast in color. The game was also colorcast on the Blackhawks' station, WGN-TV in Chicago. From the team's founding in 1972 through 1985, the station also carried some away games of the New York Islanders.
- Los Angeles: Independent KHJ-TV (now KCAL-TV) was home to the Los Angeles Kings in the early 1980s and again during the mid-to-late 1990s, long after RKO divested itself of the station. The 1966-67 RKO games aired on KHJ-TV because Los Angeles had been one of six cities that were granted expansion teams that would begin play in the Fall of 1967 (although another local station, KTLA, began televising Kings' away games from Oakland during the 1967-68 season).
- Hartford-New Haven, CT: From 1962 to 1969, independent WHCT (now WUVN) ran a subscription television service from 7 p.m. to midnight with scrambled first-run movies and sports events from Madison Square Garden.
- Windsor, ON-Detroit: The CBC-affiliated CKLW-TV's (now CBC-owned CBET) sports programming, including Hockey Night in Canada and coverage of the Olympic Games, has historically been quite popular in the Detroit area, sometimes even more popular than American network coverage of the same events. CBC's National Hockey League coverage is not subject to local blackout. Indeed, CKLW-TV/CBET has generally aired any Detroit Red Wings game covered by CBC in preference over the default national broadcast. For example, CBET aired all of the 2006 Western Conference Quarterfinal games between the Edmonton Oilers and the Red Wings, although some games were only initially designated to air in the Northern and Central Alberta (CBXT/Edmonton) region.
- Boston: RKO's oldest television station, WNAC-TV was the first station in that city to televise games of the Boston Bruins in the 1948-49 season, the first after the birth of commercial television in Boston, but would not continue carrying games after that one season. While WNAC-TV carried the sixth game of the 1966 Finals (clearing it on the day of the broadcast, bumping network programs), it did not air the 1966-67 NHL package even though it was an RKO-owned station in a city that had an NHL team. The station could not do so because at the time, WNAC was an affiliate of the ABC Television Network, and elected to air ABC's National Basketball Association games, some of which featured the Boston Celtics. Instead, the NHL games were broadcast on newly launched UHF station WKBG-TV, which also broadcast road games of the Boston Bruins during the 1966-67 season. WNAC carried NHL games produced by CBS from the 1956-57 through 1959-60 seasons as part of its affiliation with that network from June 21, 1948 through December 31, 1960; when WNAC regained CBS affiliation on March 19, 1972, it carried the remainder of the 1971-72 NHL on CBS schedule. From the 2005-2006 season until it lost its NBC affiliation on January 1, 2017, the station, by then re-named WHDH-TV, carried the full NHL on NBC schedule until January 1, 2017, when the NBC network moved to WBTS-LD, which is owned and operated by NBC itself. WHDH often got the highest ratings for NBC's NHL games among stations in "neutral markets" (that is, markets whose local team is not playing in a particular network telecast); WBTS-CD often continues to get the highest ratings for NBC's NHL telecasts in "neutral" markets.

RKO also owned WHBQ-TV in Memphis during this period. WHBQ-TV is notable for having pre-empted ABC's coverage of the "Miracle on Ice" gold medal championship game during the 1980 Winter Olympics.
