= Bill Patrick (sports anchor) =

American sports anchor (born 1955)

Bill Patrick (born November 12, 1955 in Columbus, Ohio as Gerard Monteux) is an American sports commentator. He worked as a part-time host for NHL on NBC. He’s the son of American flutist Claude Monteux and the grandson of French conductor Pierre Monteux.

== Sports broadcasting career ==
Bill Patrick graduated from the University of Maine in Orono, Maine.

He worked for USA Network from 1998 through 2006 as host of the U.S. Open and PGA Tour. He also did play-by-play and reporting for USA's PGA Tour coverage.

Prior to that, he was hired at Speedvision (Later called SPEED TV) from 1998 through 2001 as host of the weekly motorsports recap show called Speedvision News: Race Week.

He has covered every major U.S. sporting event during his 38-year broadcasting career, including all four major championships in professional golf, the U.S. Open, Wimbledon, Davis Cup, World Series, the Super Bowl, the NBA Playoffs, the Stanley Cup playoffs, and the America's Cup.

From 2003 to 2004, he co-hosted College Football Sunday with Mike Mayock on the NFL Network. He hosted SportsCenter and Baseball Tonight from 1989 to 1998 on ESPN.

In 2007, Patrick was named host of the Hockey Central Post Game Report as part of the studio show for NHL on Versus. He later hosted the nightly highlight show NHL Overtime as well as the pre- and post-game shows for NBC's coverage of Notre Dame American football, and studio updates during many of NBC's other sports programming.

Patrick also hosted 2008 Olympic coverage on MSNBC. He also hosted coverage of Ice hockey at the 2010 Winter Olympics.

== Other appearances and interests ==
Additionally, he made two guest appearances on the ABC sitcom Spin City. Bill is also a passionate nature photographer and environmental activist. In 2014, he created Monteux Gallery, located in Ellsworth, Maine (www.monteuxgallery.com).
