= Stu Nahan =

American TV sportscaster and actor (1926–2007)

- Stu Nahan
- Born: June 23, 1926; Los Angeles, California, U.S.
- Died: December 26, 2007 (aged 81); Studio City, California, U.S.
- Years active: 1946–2007
- Spouse: Sandy Nahan (19??–2007; his death)

Stu Nahan (June 23, 1926 – December 26, 2007) was an American television sportscaster in Los Angeles from the 1950s through the 1990s. He is also remembered for his role as a boxing commentator in the first six Rocky films. He received a star on the Hollywood Walk of Fame at 6549 Hollywood Boulevard on May 25, 2007.

== Biography ==
=== Early life and career ===
A native of Los Angeles, Nahan moved at age 2 with his mother to Canada, where he grew up playing ice hockey.

A star goalie at McGill University in Montreal, he signed a contract with the Toronto Maple Leafs of the National Hockey League in 1946. He was assigned to the minor-league Los Angeles Monarchs, who through the early 1950s played at the Pan Pacific Auditorium.

Nahan acted on a children's television program portraying "Skipper Stu" in Sacramento in the 1950s. He worked for KCRA in Sacramento as a sportscaster. Nahan later moved to Haddonfield, New Jersey (near Philadelphia) where he hosted his own children's show as Captain Philadelphia, dressed in an astronaut outfit, on the since defunct WKBS-TV. During this stint, he also provided the play-by-play commentary for the NHL's Philadelphia Flyers at WTAF alongside Gene Hart, and for CBS with Jim Gordon, and teamed with Tom Brookshier to call Philadelphia Eagles NFL games for CBS.

=== Film career ===
In the mid-to-late 1970s, Nahan began working in the movie industry, always playing a sports commentator and usually appearing as himself. Aside from the Rocky series, Nahan made a brief appearance in Fast Times at Ridgemont High (1982), in which he interviews the character Jeff Spicoli (Sean Penn) in a dream sequence; this scene was parodied in "Chuck Versus Tom Sawyer" with a fictional "Stu Brewster" (portrayed by Bill Lewis). Nahan also had a bit part in the 1971 TV movie, Brian's Song, as the speaker who introduced Gale Sayers at the awards banquet where Sayers was named Rookie of the Year. He played a small but vital role in the Rocky films as the play-by-play commentator who called all of the fictional boxer's title bouts. Nahan's voice was used for the play-by-play in the computer boxing game that helped spark the title character's comeback in the sixth film of the series, Rocky Balboa. Additionally, he had a small role as an announcer in The A-Team episode, "Quarterback Sneak". Mr. Nahan also had small roles as the news anchor in the 1979 movie Meteor and in the CHiPs episode "Something Special" S6E6 as himself.

=== Los Angeles television market ===
Nahan was a sports anchor in the Los Angeles television market for roughly 30 years, with KABC-TV (1968–1977), KNBC (1977–1986) and KTLA (1988–1999). He also spent time with radio stations KABC, KXTA, and KFWB. He was involved with the Los Angeles Dodgers' pregame show, from which he retired after the 2004 season.

=== Death ===
Nahan battled lymphoma after he was diagnosed in January 2006. He died at his home in Studio City, California, aged 81.

His star on the Hollywood Walk of Fame is at 6549 Hollywood Boulevard.

== Filmography ==
- Brian's Song (1971) - Speaker
- Gus (1976) - L.A. Sportscaster
- Rocky (1976) - Fight Commentator (uncredited)
- Rocky II (1979) - Fight Commentator
- Meteor (1979) - Football Announcer
- Private Benjamin (1980) - Newscaster
- The Harlem Globetrotters on Gilligan's Island (1981) - Sportscaster #1
- Rocky III (1982) - Title Rematch Commentator
- Fast Times at Ridgemont High (1982) - Himself
- Rocky IV (1985) - Commentator #1
- The A Team (1987) - Commentator #1
- Transylvania Twist (1989) - Sports Announcer
- Taking Care of Business (1990) - Radio Reporter at Airport
- Rocky V (1990) - Fight Commentator
- The Great White Hype (1996) - Fight Announcer #1
- Rocky Balboa (2006) - Computer Fight Commentator (voice) (final film role)

Preceded by Bill Mazer	Stanley Cup Final American network TV color commentator 1967–1968	Succeeded by Bill Mazer
