= NHL on television in the 1980s =

North American professional ice hockey on television

During the 1979–80 and 1980–81 seasons, four more Canadian teams, the Edmonton Oilers, Quebec Nordiques, Winnipeg Jets, and Calgary Flames, joined the NHL. The Oilers and Flames were featured frequently as the two teams were contenders the 1980s; in contrast, as the Nordiques were owned by Carling-O'Keefe, a rival to the show's sponsor Molson and whose English-speaking fanbase was very small (being located in a near-exclusively Francophone area of Quebec), the Nords were rarely broadcast, and never from Quebec City during the regular-season.

After Wayne Gretzky was traded to the Los Angeles Kings in 1988, the network began showing occasional double-headers when Canadian teams visited Los Angeles to showcase the sport's most popular player. These games were often joined-in-progress, as the regular start time for HNIC was still 8 p.m. Eastern Time, and the Kings home games began at 7:30 p.m. Pacific Time (10:30 Eastern). Beginning in the 1994–95 season, weekly double-headers became the norm, with games starting at 7:30 Eastern and 7:30 Pacific, respectively. In 1998, the start times were moved ahead to 7 p.m. ET and PT.

In the U.S., the USA Network continued to be the national rightsholder for the 1980–81 and 1981–82 seasons, while ESPN made deals with a selected number of individual teams to air their games during that period. In 1982, USA outbid ESPN for the NHL's American national television cable package. The rights were then passed on to ESPN in 1985 before SportsChannel America took over in 1988.

== Year-by-year breakdown ==
=== 1980 ===
In 1979–80, the National Hockey League replaced their syndicated coverage package The NHL Network with a package on USA. At the time, the USA Network was called UA-Columbia. As the immediate forerunner for the USA Network, UA-Columbia, served as the cable syndicated arm of not only MSG Network in New York, but also PRISM channel in Philadelphia, and whatever pay/cable outlets were around in 1979.

USA's coverage began as a Monday night series with Dan Kelly doing play-by-play alongside a variety of commentators including Pete Stemkowski, Lou Nanne and Brian McFarlane. Scott Wahle was the intermission host.

ESPN initially covered the NHL during the 1979–80, 1980–81 and 1981–82 seasons by making deals with individual teams. This included eleven Hartford Whalers home broadcasts in 1980–81 and 25 the following year. During this time, USA also broadcast National Hockey League games. In order to prevent overexposure, the NHL decided to grant only one network exclusive rights. In April 1982, USA outbid ESPN for the NHL's American national television cable package ($8 million for two years).

The independent Hughes Television Network broadcast National Hockey League games aired under the title The NHL '80. Hughes broadcast Thursday night games, the All-Star Game, some playoff games, and games 1-5 of the Stanley Cup Final. Hughes technically, used CBC's Hockey Night in Canada feeds for the American coverage of the first five games of the Stanley Cup Final. The first broadcast involved the Atlanta Flames against the Chicago Blackhawks on January 25.

On April 9, 1980, CBC carried the ACTRA awards ceremony. This caused game two of Hartford-Montreal and Edmonton-Philadelphia playoff games not to be televised. Meanwhile, the Toronto-Minnesota game was shifted to CHCH in Hamilton while the Vancouver-Buffalo game was televised by CBC regionally in British Columbia as usual. The ACTRA awards show was tape-delayed into prime time on the west coast.

During the 1980 Stanley Cup Final, Bob Cole, Dan Kelly and Jim Robson shared play-by-play duties for CBC's coverage. Cole did play-by-play for the first half of games 1–2. Meanwhile, Kelly did play-by-play for half of games 1–5 (Kelly also called the overtime period of game one). Finally, Robson did play-by-play for the half of games 3–4 and game six entirely. In essence, this meant that Cole or Robson did play-by-play for the first period and the first half of the second period (except for game five in which the roles of Kelly and Robson were switched). Therefore, at the closest stoppage of play near the ten-minute mark of the second period, Cole or Robson handed off the call to Kelly for the rest of the game.

CBS only aired one other NHL game following game two of the 1979 Challenge Cup. That would take place on May 24, 1980, with Game 6 of the Stanley Cup Final between the Philadelphia Flyers and the New York Islanders. CBS was mainly influenced by the United States men's Olympic hockey team's surprise gold medal victory (dubbed "The Miracle on Ice") in Lake Placid several months prior. CBS agreed to pay $37 million to broadcast the sixth game. In return, the NHL happily moved the starting time from prime time to the afternoon. The Saturday afternoon game was the first full American network telecast of an NHL game since game five of the 1975 Stanley Cup Final aired on NBC. As previously mentioned, when CBS broadcast game two of the 1979 Challenge Cup, it was only seen on CBS for the third period.

Game six was won in overtime by the host Islanders, which captured the first of their four consecutive Stanley Cups. By this time, Dan Kelly was joined by former NHL on NBC commentator, Tim Ryan. Kelly did play-by-play for the first and third periods as well as overtime. Meanwhile, Tim Ryan did play-by-play only for the second period. Minnesota North Stars general manager Lou Nanne was the color commentator throughout the game.

Game six pulled a 4.4 rating on CBS. After the game ended, except for its owned-and-operated stations in New York City and Philadelphia, CBS discontinued the telecast and went to a previously scheduled golf telecast. New York and Philadelphia viewers saw a post-game show before the network joined the very end of the golf broadcast. Given that the game went into overtime, CBS cut away from hockey during the intermission between the end of regulation and the start of overtime to present ten minutes of live golf coverage, with the golf announcers repeatedly mentioning that the network would return to hockey in time for the start of sudden-death.

As previously mentioned, game six of the 1980 Stanley Cup Final turned out to be the last NHL game (to date) to be televised on CBS. It was also the last NHL game on American network television until NBC televised the 1990 All-Star Game.

=== 1981 ===
For the 1980–81 season, some Sunday night games were added. Dan Kelly once again, did most of the play-by-play alongside Mike Eruzione. Dick Carlson and Jiggs McDonald also did play-by-play work on occasion. In addition, Don Cherry was a commentator for at least one game. Meanwhile, Jim West was the host for most games.

With USA's coverage of the 1981 Stanley Cup Playoffs, it marked the first time that there was "blanket" American television coverage of the NHL playoffs. In other words, often, whenever a game was played, it was televised on a national outlet (whether it was broadcast or cable). USA however, didn't televise game one of the playoff series between Philadelphia Flyers and Calgary Flames (April 16) because they were instead broadcasting a baseball game between the Pittsburgh Pirates and Philadelphia Phillies. Meanwhile, they also skipped games 2–6 (on April 17, 22 and 24) of the Philadelphia–Calgary series because of their coverage of the NBA playoffs. USA also didn't televise games two and five of the playoff series between the Calgary Flames and Minnesota North Stars (April 30 and May 7 respectively) because of baseball games involving the Minnesota Twins vs. the Boston Red Sox and the Los Angeles Dodgers vs. the Philadelphia Phillies respectively.

=== 1982 ===
In the 1981–82 season, Al Trautwig took over as studio host. Dan Kelly did play-by-play with either Gary Green or Rod Gilbert on color commentary. For the playoffs, Dick Carlson and Al Albert were added as play-by-play voices of some games. Meanwhile, Jim Van Horne hosted Stanley Cup Final games played in Vancouver.

In April 1982, USA outbid ESPN for the NHL's American national television cable package with $8 million (at least $2 million more than what ESPN was offering).

Aside from the 1982 Stanley Cup Final, CBC's only other nationally televised postseason games (all other games were seen regionally) from that year were the April 23 Boston-Quebec game (Game 6), the April 25 Quebec-Boston game (Game 7), and the May 6 Vancouver-Chicago game (Game 5).

=== 1983 ===
Things pretty much remained the same for USA during the 1982–83 season. Dan Kelly and Gary Green called most games, while Al Albert did play-by-play on several playoff games and hosted the Stanley Cup Final from the Nassau Coliseum. USA didn't cover any playoff games on April 7, 1983, because they were broadcasting second round highlights of The Masters followed by a West Coast NBA telecast.

=== 1984 ===
In the 1983–84 season, USA covered over 40 games including the playoffs. While Gary Green did all games, Dan Kelly and Al Albert did roughly 20 games each. Meanwhile, Jiggs McDonald helped broadcast at least one game.

Because USA was airing Masters highlights, game one of the 1984 playoff series between the Minnesota North Stars and St. Louis Blues (April 12) and game two of the playoff series between the New York Islanders and Washington Capitals (April 13) were aired on tape delay at 10 p.m. Eastern Time.

=== 1985 ===
In the 1984–85 and 1985–86 seasons, the NHL returned to CTV, with regular season games on Friday nights (and some Sunday afternoons) as well as partial coverage of the playoffs and Stanley Cup Final.

CTV/Carling O'Keefe initially signed a contract well into the 1984–85 season. As a result, they wanted to cram as many games as possible (beginning in February) in the brief window they had. 1985-86's coverage didn't begin until November, so to avoid conflicts with CTV's coverage of the Major League Baseball postseason and the Canadian Football League.

While Molson continued to present Hockey Night in Canada on Saturday nights on the CBC, rival brewery Carling O'Keefe began airing Friday Night Hockey on CTV. This marked the first time in more than a decade that CBC was not the lone over-the-air network broadcaster of the National Hockey League in Canada.

The deal with CTV was arranged by the Quebec Nordiques (who were owned by Carling O'Keefe) and all 14 U.S.-based NHL clubs, who sought to break Molson's monopoly on NHL broadcasting in Canada. All of CTV's regular season telecasts originated from Quebec City or the United States, as Molson shut them out of the other six Canadian buildings (as Carling did to them in Quebec City).

For USA's final full season of NHL coverage in 1984–85, Dan Kelly and Gary Green once again, did most games, while Al Albert and Green called the rest. In all, the USA Network covered about 55 games, including 33 in the regular season. Also, Hartford Whalers goaltender Mike Liut was added as a studio analyst for the Stanley Cup Final.

Meanwhile, for increased publicity opportunities, the Stroh Brewing Company turned to such sports as hockey—which had been overlooked by Anheuser and Miller—and sponsored broadcasts of National Hockey League games on the USA cable network.

Seldom during the early rounds of the playoffs did USA carry an away game of one of the three New York-area teams (New York Rangers, New York Islanders, or New Jersey Devils) since WOR-TV New York, at the time available on most of the nation's cable television systems, often carried that away game of the New York-area team both locally in New York and on its "superstation" feed. One exception was a playoff game between two of the New York-area clubs, since WOR was usually barred from carrying it since the home team's cable-television contract superseded the visiting club's over-the-air television deal.

In 1984–85, Dan Kelly and Ron Reusch called the Philadelphia-Quebec Wales Conference Final series on CTV. They also televised Games 3, 4 and 6 of the Montréal-Québec Adams Division Final and Games 2 and 5 of the Philadelphia-New York Islanders Patrick Division Final.

During 1985 Stanley Cup Finals, CBC televised Games 1 and 2 nationally while Games 3, 4, and 5 were televised in Edmonton only. CTV televised Games 3, 4, and 5 nationally while games were blacked out in Edmonton. Dan Kelly, Ron Reusch, and Brad Park called the games on CTV. In 1986, CBC only televised Games 1 and 2 in Montreal and Calgary. CBC would go on to televise Games 3, 4 and 5 nationally. When CTV televised Games 1 and 2, both games were blacked out in Montréal and Calgary. Like the year prior, the same trio called the games for CTV.

After the 1984–85 season, the NHL Board of Governors chose to have USA and ESPN submit sealed bids. ESPN won by bidding nearly $25 million for three years, about twice as much as USA had been paying. The contract called for ESPN to air up to 33 regular-season games each season as well as the NHL All-Star Game and the Stanley Cup playoffs.

On New Year's Eve 1985, CTV broadcast one such game between the Montreal Canadiens and CSKA Moscow in Montreal. Although CTV aired the game (as a "Special Presentation of CTV Sports"), it was not considered an official part of NHL on CTV package, because the broadcast was presented by Molson instead of Carling O'Keefe. However, the regular NHL on CTV on-air talent were still utilized.

=== 1986 ===
As previously mentioned, the contract called for ESPN to air up to 33 regular season games each season as well as the NHL All-Star game and the Stanley Cup playoffs. The network chose Dan Kelly and Sam Rosen to be the network's first play-by-play announcers, Mickey Redmond and Brad Park were selected to be the analysts, and Tom Mees and Jim Kelly were chosen to serve as studio and game hosts respectively. ESPN designated Sundays as Hockey Night in America, but also aired select midweek telecasts. ESPN aired its first game, an opening-night matchup between the Washington Capitals and New York Rangers, on October 10, 1985.

However, ESPN did not have fixed broadcast teams during the 1985–86 season. Sam Rosen, Ken Wilson, Jim Hughson, Dan Kelly, Mike Lange, Jiggs McDonald, Jim Kelly, Mike Emrick, and Mike Patrick handled the play-by-play and Mickey Redmond, Bill Clement, John Davidson, Gary Dornhoefer, Phil Esposito, and Brad Park provided color commentary.

The 1985–86 Canadian coverage of the All-Star Game was to be provided by CTV. However, CTV had a prior commitment to carry the third and final episode of Sins, a U.S. miniseries. As a result, TSN took over coverage of the game in Hartford.

Dan Kelly, Ron Reusch, and Bobby Taylor called the Calgary-St.Louis Campbell Conference Final series on CTV. CTV's coverage was blacked out in Calgary, where CBC provided coverage. For the Calgary Flames-Winnipeg Jets first-round series in 1985–86, CBC, who initially had the rights to the series, ultimately passed as they were already maxed out with three other series (Montreal-Boston, Chicago-Toronto, and Edmonton-Vancouver). The rights to the Calgary-Winnipeg series were eventually sold to the CTV affiliates in Calgary (CFCN) and Winnipeg (CKY) as well as Carling O'Keefe.

Following the 1985–86 season, CTV decided to pull the plug on the venture. Their limited access to Canadian-based teams (other than Quebec, whose English-speaking fan base was quite small) translated into poor ratings. For the next two years, Carling O'Keefe retained their rights, and syndicated playoff telecasts on a chain of local stations that would one day become the Global Television Network under the names Stanley Cup '87 and Stanley Cup '88, before a merger between the two breweries put an end to the competition.

=== 1987 ===
Despite CTV pulling the plug on their two-year-long venture with the NHL, Carling O'Keefe retained their rights (there were two years remaining on the contract with/without CTV).

Things became problematic when the 1987 Stanley Cup playoffs opened with Carling O'Keefe still without a network of some sort. The problems arguably peaked when the Montreal-Quebec second-round playoff series opened without Molson being allowed to broadcast from Quebec City, leaving Games 3 and 4 off of English-language television altogether. This led to a hastily arranged syndicated package on a chain of channels that would one day form the basis of the Global Television Network. The deal between Carling O'Keefe and the Canwest/Global consortium (with a few CBC and CTV affiliates sprinkled in for good measure) came just in time for game six of the Montreal-Quebec series on April 30.

It must be stressed that Global, technically, didn't become a national network until 1997. During the 1980s, Global consisted of a single station in Toronto with some rebroadcast transmitters through Ontario, CanWest was a chain of independent channels in Western Canada, and the two often combined to carry syndicated programming, such as this NHL package and the Canadian Football Network, which would also begin in 1987. These NHL broadcasts were aired under the names Stanley Cup '87 and Stanley Cup '88, before a merger between Carling O'Keefe and Molson (the presenters of Hockey Night in Canada on CBC as previously mentioned) put an end to the competition.

In 1987, coverage also included all five games of the Campbell Conference Final between the Edmonton Oilers and Detroit Red Wings, and Games 3–5 of the Final between the Oilers and Philadelphia Flyers.

=== 1988 ===
In 1988, coverage included the Smythe Division Final between the Edmonton Oilers and Calgary Flames (which Global carried nationally, except for the Edmonton and Calgary markets, where the CBC retained exclusive rights), Game five of the Norris Division Final between the Detroit Red Wings and St. Louis Blues, the Campbell Conference Final between the Oilers and Red Wings, and Games 1 and two of the Final between the Oilers and Boston Bruins. They also had the rights to Games 6 and 7 of the Finals, which were not necessary.

On April 18, 1988 (during game one of the Montreal-Boston playoff series) at approximately 8:08 p.m. local time, there was a power outage in the province of Quebec. While darkness enveloped Montreal and the Forum itself, the Forum's reserve generators kicked into gear. The generators were only able to illuminate the rink surface with enough power to keep the game moving. Ultimately, CBC was left with no choice but to abandon coverage following the 1st period. Chris Cuthbert was assigned by CBC to report and provide updates on game one of Washington-New Jersey playoff series. However, when the Quebec blackout affected CBC's coverage of the game one of the Boston-Montreal playoff series, CBC decided to throw to Cuthbert and the solitary camera beside him in his coverage position to work the remainder of game 1. The whole process was totally done off the cuff. In other words, there were no graphics, no replay capabilities, and no analyst.

Unlike the split CTV/CBC coverage of 1984–85 and 1985–86, the Canwest-Global telecasts were network exclusive, except for game seven of the Stanley Cup Final if they were necessary. When CBC and Global televised game seven of the 1987 Stanley Cup Finals, they used separate production facilities and separate on-air talent.

=== 1989 ===
SportsChannel America was the exclusive American broadcaster of the 1989 All-Star Game. The following year, they covered the first ever NHL Skills Competition and Heroes of Hockey game. SportsChannel America would continue their coverage of these particular events through 1992. In 1991, SportsChannel America replayed the third period of the All-Star Game on the same day that it was played. That was because NBC broke away from the live telecast during the third period in favor of Gulf War coverage.

In 1989, SportsChannel America provided the first ever American coverage of the NHL Draft. In September 1989, SportsChannel America covered the Washington Capitals' training camp in Sweden and pre-season tour of the Soviet Union. The Capitals were joined by the Stanley Cup champion Calgary Flames, who held training camp in Prague, Czechoslovakia and then ventured to the Soviet Union. Each team played four games against Soviet National League clubs. Games were played in Moscow, Leningrad, Kyiv and Riga. The NHL clubs finished with a combined 6–2 record against the top Soviet teams, including the Red Army club and Dynamo Moscow. Five of the eight contests were televised by SportsChannel America.

Unfortunately, SportsChannel America was only available in a few major markets, and reached only a 1/3 of the households that ESPN did at the time. SportsChannel America was seen in fewer than 10 million households. In comparison, by the 1991–92 season, ESPN was available in 60.5 million homes whereas SportsChannel America was available in only 25 million. As a matter of fact, in the first year of the deal (1988–89), SportsChannel America was available in only 7 million homes when compared to ESPN's reach of 50 million. When the SportsChannel deal ended in 1992, the league returned to ESPN for another contract that would pay US$80 million over five years.

SportsChannel America took advantage of using their regional sports networks' feed of a game, graphics and all, instead of producing a show from the ground up, most of the time. Distribution of SportsChannel America across the country was limited to cities that had a SportsChannel regional sports network or affiliate. Very few cable systems in non-NHL territories picked it up as a stand-alone service. Regional affiliates of the Prime Network would sometimes pick up SportsChannel broadcasts, but this was often only during the playoffs, and often to justify the cost, some cable providers carrying it during the playoffs only carried it as a pay-per-view option. SportsChannel America also did not broadcast 24 hours a day at first, usually on by 6 p.m., off by 12 Midnight, then a sportsticker for the next 18 hours.

== See also ==
- List of Hockey Night in Canada commentating crews (1980s)
