= USA Sports (1977–2007) =

Former sports broadcasts on USA Network

- Network: Madison Square Garden Sports Network (1977–1980); USA Network (1980–2007)
- Launched: September 22, 1977; 48 years ago
- Closed: April 6, 2007; 19 years ago
- Country of origin: United States
- Owner: UA-Columbia Cablevision NBCUniversal Cable Entertainment Group (Comcast)
- Key people: Kay Koplovitz (Founder/Chairman & CEO, USA Network)
- Headquarters: Comcast Building, New York City, New York
- Major broadcasting contracts: MLB; Masters; NBA; NHL; US Open (tennis)
- Format: Sports
- Original language: English
- Official website: usanetwork.com/sports

USA Sports was the branding used for broadcasts of sporting events by the cable channel USA Network that was active from September 22, 1977, to April 6, 2007.

The network's history with sports dates back to its forerunner, the Madison Square Garden Network, and in the past has included coverage of the major professional leagues, college football, golf (including the Masters Tournament and Ryder Cup) and tennis.

After the formation of NBC Universal in 2004, which saw General Electric's NBC take a majority stake in Vivendi Universal's U.S. operations (including USA Network), USA Sports was dissolved, and NBC Sports assumed production duties for its remaining sports properties. It was also incorporated into NBC's coverage of the Olympic Games.

After Comcast's purchase of NBC Universal and the launch of NBCSN, USA Network began to be increasingly used as an overflow outlet for NBC Sports properties in the event of scheduling conflicts, and during larger events such as the Olympics, the Stanley Cup Playoffs, and the Premier League's "Survival Sunday". On January 1, 2022, NBCSN was shut down, and USA Network once again became the primary linear pay television outlet for NBC Sports programming.

The USA Sports branding was relaunched in 2025 prior to the spin-off of NBCUniversal's cable channels to Versant.

== Early years as the Madison Square Garden Network ==
As the immediate forerunner for the USA Network, UA-Columbia Cablevision served as the cable syndicated arm of MSG Network in New York, PRISM channel in Philadelphia, and whatever pay/cable outlets were around in 1979.

Manhattan Cable (subsequently referred to as the MSG Network) debuted in the spring of 1969 and did all home events from the Madison Square Garden: New York Knicks basketball, New York Rangers hockey, college basketball, horse shows, Golden Gloves boxing, tennis, the Westminster Dog Show, ice capades, professional wrestling, etc. The first reference to the channel as “MSG Network” was sometime around 1971–72, although the name did not become official until 1977.

The first televised events were NHL and NBA playoffs in the spring of 1969; in those playoffs Marty Glickman did play-by-play for the Knicks broadcasts while Win Elliott did play-by-play for the Rangers.

Meanwhile, HBO began simulcasting some MSG games in 1972 beginning with the Rangers/Vancouver Canucks game on November 8, 1972 (the first ever program televised on HBO, to a few subscribers in Wilkes-Barre, Pennsylvania). 1974–75 marked the only year in which HBO used MSG announcers for their feed. Because HBO is a premium cable service, this created a burden on announcers to fill in dead airtime on HBO while commercials aired on MSG Network. HBO did not broadcast Knicks or Rangers games after the 1976–77 season.

When the MSG/HBO marriage ended in 1977, Madison Square Garden proceeded to seek a new partner to launch a national network to show off its events. So for several years, beginning with the 1977–78 season, all MSG home events (such as those involving the Knicks, Rangers, etc.) were then televised on a fledgling network that would eventually become known as the USA Network. This channel, which debuted on September 22, 1977, was basically a continuation of the existing MSG Network. The key difference however, was that it was now nationally syndicated via satellite rather than terrestrially. It was also the first cable channel to be supported by advertising revenues. By this time (as previously alluded to), the channel was officially called the “Madison Square Garden Network” or MSG Network.

== As USA Network ==
In 1979–80, the National Hockey League replaced their syndicated coverage package The NHL Network with a package on USA. As previously mentioned, the USA Network was for a time, called UA-Columbia Cablevision. As the immediate forerunner for the USA Network, UA-Columbia served as the cable syndicated arm of not only MSG Network in New York, but also PRISM channel in Philadelphia, and whatever pay/cable outlets were around in 1979.

In 1979, 22 Major League Baseball teams (all but the Atlanta Braves, Houston Astros, New York Mets, and St. Louis Cardinals) participated in a one-year cable deal with United Artists Television and Columbia Pictures Television, then-owners of the USA Network. The deal involved the airing of a Thursday night Game of the Week in markets at least 50 miles (80 km) from a major league park. The deal earned Major League Baseball less than $500,000, but led to a new two-year contract for 40–45 games per season. The program ran through the 1983 season.

=== 1980s ===
During USA's first three seasons (1980-1982) broadcasting college football, they broadcast several games (they in essence, cherry picked games from regional and national syndicators like Raycom, Mizlou, and Katz) a week. These broadcasts were shown on a tape delayed basis as much as two days later. USA's telecast of the 1981 Liberty Bowl was the first college bowl game to be exclusively broadcast on cable television.

Mazda SportsLook with host Roy Firestone debuted in 1981 on USA Network. It was created by the advertising agency Foote, Cone and Belding to advertise one of its clients, Mazda cars. Mazda SportsLook would soon move to ESPN a year later, where it would subsequently be rechristened as Up Close.

By around 1982, USA Network also carried games from the North American Soccer League, usually on Wednesday nights.

==== College and pro basketball ====
USA aired college basketball games from the Big East Conference leading up to their coverage of the 1983 Big East tournament. USA also had rights to games from the Big Ten, ACC, and the old Metro Conference.

Regular season college basketball games aired on Thursday nights or Saturdays under the title of College Basketball... followed by the corresponding year during the season such as College Basketball '87. The games were subject to local blackouts. By this time, USA was airing games involving the Southeastern Conference (such as the Mississippi and Mississippi State) and games featuring UTEP and Wyoming.

USA also aired the National Invitation Tournament including the finals.

For USA's final four seasons (1983-1986) with college football, they narrowed their coverage to only one game a week. Initially, the games were selected from virtually every conference. However, in the later years, USA would frequently (but not exclusively) air games involving Pittsburgh, Penn State, Notre Dame, Boston College and Maryland. More to the point, by 1984, USA primarily aired games from the Big Eight Conference.

When the USA Network signed a three-year (running through the 1981-82 season), $1.5 million deal, it marked the first time that the NBA had a cable television partner. USA would extend their deal with a two-year contract (along with another cable partner in the form of ESPN) worth a total of $11 million.

USA typically aired approximately 35–40 regular season NBA doubleheaders on Thursday nights. Besides regular season and playoff action, USA also broadcast the NBA draft. USA (as well as ESPN) was ultimately succeeded by TBS, who paid $20 million for two years beginning in the 1984–85 season.

From 1982 to 1984, USA Network broadcast the UNO Twin 125s (now the Gander RV Duel). USA used CBS' crew, graphics and announcers.

USA also aired the Atlanta ARCA race in 1985 and televised several NASCAR Busch Series races in the late 1980s.

==== USA begins their coverage of the Masters ====
The USA Network began first and second round Masters coverage in 1982, which was also produced by the CBS production team. This was the first ever cable coverage for one of the golf majors. Initially, the USA Network provided Thursday and Friday coverage for 2 hours live each day along with a prime time replay.

Beginning in July 1982, USA Network broadcast professional ten-pin bowling matches from the PBA Tour every Thursday night.

Tuesday Night Fights aired from October 1, 1982, through August 25, 1998 on the USA Network; at one time it was the longest continually-running boxing show on television.

On January 24, 1984, Al Albert, working for USA network, called what Syracuse fans call the greatest basketball game in the Carrier Dome ever. Syracuse faced Boston College, and the teams were tied 73–73 after a missed free throw by Boston College's Martin Clark. Sean Kerins passed the rebound to Pearl Washington who took three steps and made a half court shot to win the game. Albert's call lives in infamy as The Greatest Play By Play Call in the Carrier Dome ever: "Washington, two seconds, OHHHH! 'The Pearl' hits it ..at midcourt." Syracuse University basketball fans call that the greatest nine words in Syracuse history.

==== USA gains the US Open and loses the NHL ====
Beginning in 1984, USA started its stints the longtime cable home of the US Open, which moved to ESPN2 and the Tennis Channel as of 2009.

After the 1984–85 season, the NHL Board of Governors chose to have USA and ESPN submit sealed bids. ESPN won by bidding nearly $25 million for three years, about twice as much as USA had been paying. The contract called for ESPN to air up to 33 regular season games each season as well as the NHL All-Star game and the Stanley Cup playoffs.

After the USA Network lost the rights to the NHL to ESPN, they largely abandoned sports after the early 1990s as the channel shifted almost exclusively to scripted entertainment.

=== 1990s ===
USA Network carried most of the World League of American Football games on Saturday and Monday nights in the 1991 season and again on Saturday nights for the 1992 season. Diana Nyad served as the network's host for pregame and halftime. The network premiered the helmet cam to TV audiences.

ABC Sports broadcast some games in both seasons, mostly on Sunday afternoons. ABC showed the 1991 World Bowl, while USA carried the game in 1992.

The reported cost of the contracts NFL Game varied – the L.A. Times said that ABC had paid $28 million for two years, and USA paid $25 million. For the 1992 season, the WLAF charged each network less for broadcasting rights; The New York Times reported that ABC's annual fee went down from $12 million to $3 million, and USA's from $14 million to $10 million. The ABC coverage's average ratings fell from 1991 to 1992, from around 2.1 to 1.7, and USA's from 1.2 to 1.1. Both networks asked the WLAF to expand into two major U.S. markets for 1993.

From 1994–2001 (before ESPN took over), USA was the American cable home of the French Open.

== Programs throughout the years ==
- College Basketball on USA (1982–88)
- College Football on USA (1980–86)
- Major Indoor Soccer League (1981–83)
- NASCAR on USA (1982–85)
  - UNO Twin 125s (1982-84)
- NHL on USA (1979–85)
  - Stanley Cup Finals (1981-85)
- North American Soccer League (1982–83)
- PBA on USA (1982–84)
- PGA Tour on USA (1982–2007, 2010)
  - The Masters tournament (1982–2007)
  - Ryder Cup (1989–2010)
- USA Network Thursday Night Baseball (1979–83)
- Tuesday Night Fights (1982–98)
- U.S. Open Tennis Championship (1984–2008)
  - French Open (1994–2001)
- World League of American Football (1991–92)
  - World Bowl '92

== See also ==
- USA Network § Sports programming
