= USA Network Sports =

USA Network Sports, may refer to:

- USA Sports (1977–2007), the former sports department of USA Network
- NBC Sports on USA Network, the branding used for NBC Sports airing on USA Network
- USA Sports (2025–present), the sports division of Versant responsible for most sports broadcasts on USA Network since 2025
