= NBA on USA =

NBA basketball cable telecasts (1977–1984)

- Genre: NBA game telecasts
- Starring: See list of commentators section
- Country of origin: United States
- Original language: English
- No. of seasons: 7

Production
- Camera setup: Multi-camera
- Running time: 180 minutes
- Production company: USA Sports

Original release
- Network: USA Network
- Release: 1977 – 1984

Related
- NBA on NBC; WNBA on USA

The NBA on USA is the de facto name for the USA Network's National Basketball Association (NBA) television coverage. The program ran from the 1979–80 season through the 1983–84 season.

== Coverage overview ==
=== Before the USA Network came to be (1969–79) ===
==== Manhattan Cable and HBO ====
Manhattan Cable (subsequently referred to as the MSG Network) debuted in the spring of 1969 and did all home events from the Madison Square Garden: New York Knicks basketball, New York Rangers hockey, college basketball, horse shows, Golden Gloves boxing, tennis, the Westminster Dog Show, ice capades, professional wrestling, etc. The first reference to the channel as “MSG Network” was sometime around 1971–72, although the name did not become official until 1977.

The first televised events were NHL and NBA playoffs in the spring of 1969; in those playoffs Marty Glickman did play-by-play for the Knicks broadcasts while Win Elliott did play-by-play for the Rangers.

Meanwhile, HBO began simulcasting some MSG games in 1972 beginning with the Rangers/Vancouver Canucks game on November 8, 1972 (the first ever program televised on HBO, to a few subscribers in Wilkes-Barre, PA). 1974–75 marked the only year in which HBO used MSG announcers for their feed. Because HBO is a premium cable service, this created a burden on announcers to fill in dead airtime on HBO while commercials aired on MSG Network. HBO did not broadcast Knicks or Rangers games after the 1976–77 season.

==== UA-Columbia ====
When the MSG/HBO marriage ended in 1977, Madison Square Garden proceeded to seek a new partner to launch a national network to show off its events. So for several years, beginning with the 1977–78 season, all MSG home events (such as those involving the Knicks, Rangers, etc.) were then televised on a fledgling network that would eventually become known as the USA Network. This channel, which debuted in September 1977, was basically a continuation of the existing MSG Network. The key difference however, was that it was now nationally syndicated via satellite rather than terrestrially. It was also the first cable channel to be supported by advertising revenues. By this time, the channel was officially called the “Madison Square Garden Network” or MSG Network.

In 1979–80, the National Hockey League replaced their syndicated coverage package The NHL Network with a package on USA. At the time, the USA Network was called UA-Columbia. As the immediate forerunner for the USA Network, UA-Columbia, served as the cable syndicated arm of MSG Network in New York, PRISM channel in Philadelphia, and whatever pay/cable outlets were around in 1979.

==== The formation of the USA Network ====
On April 9, 1980, the Madison Square Garden Network changed its name to the USA Network. This occurred when the ownership structure was reorganized under a joint operating agreement by the UA-Columbia Cablevision cable system (now known as Cablevision Systems Corporation) and MCA (then the parent of Universal Studios, now owned by NBCUniversal). Things took a step further one year later when, Time Inc. (which eventually merged with Warner Communications to form Time Warner) and Paramount Pictures Corp. (then a division of Gulf+Western, now owned by Viacom) took minority ownership stakes in USA in 1981. G+W also owned the New York Knicks and the MSG regional sports television network (both later owned by Cablevision but spun off in 2010).

=== 1981–84 coverage ===
When the USA Network signed a three-year (running through the 1981-82 season), $1.5 million deal, it marked the first time that the NBA had a cable television partner. USA would extend their deal with a two-year contract (along with another cable partner in the form of ESPN) worth a total of $11 million.

USA typically aired approximately 35–40 regular season doubleheaders on Thursday nights. Besides regular season and playoff action, USA also broadcast the NBA draft. USA (as well as ESPN) was ultimately succeeded by TBS, who paid $20 million for two years beginning in the 1984–85 season.

==== Announcers ====
- Al Albert
- Hubie Brown
- Lou Carnesecca (an analyst for USA's draft coverage)
- Eddie Doucette
- Steve Jones
- Jim Karvellas
- Tom Kelly
- Jon McGlocklin
- Richie Powers

In 1980, USA televised two NBA games on Christmas Day. Jim Karvellas and Richie Powers called the early game involving New Jersey at Washington. Meanwhile, Eddie Doucette and Steve Jones called the late game involving Golden State at Portland.

During the 1981–82 season, Al Albert and Hubie Brown called the early game while Eddie Doucette and Steve "Snapper" Jones called the late game. Hubie Brown was subsequently replaced by Jon McGlocklin as Al Albert's partner.

The 1982 NBA Finals documentary "Something To Prove" recaps all the action of this series. It was the last NBA video documentary to exclusively use film in all on-court action. Dick Stockton narrated the documentary, with the condensed USA Network version narrated by Al Albert.

==== Conference Finals broadcasters ====
Year	Conference	Play-by-play	Color commentators
1984	Eastern (Games 4–5)	Al Albert	Steve Jones
1983	Eastern (Game 5)	Al Albert	Hubie Brown
1982	Western (Game 4)	Eddie Doucette	Hubie Brown

== See also ==
- NHL on USA
- The USA Thursday Game of the Week
- USA Tuesday Night Fights

Preceded by None	NBA network broadcast co-partner 1979–1984	Succeeded by TBS
