= PBA on USA =

- Genre: Bowling telecasts
- Presented by: Eddie Doucette; Pete Liebengood; Al Trautwig; Mike Durbin; Earl Anthony
- Country of origin: United States
- Original language: English

Production
- Camera setup: Multi-camera
- Running time: 90 to 180 minutes or until tournament ends
- Production company: USA Sports

Original release
- Network: USA
- Release: 1982 – 1984

PBA on USA is a presentation of professional ten-pin bowling matches from the Professional Bowlers Association Tour formerly produced by the USA cable television in the United States from 1982 to 1984.

== Coverage overview ==
The USA Network broadcast matches every Thursday night. USA's first telecast was the Kessler Open from San Jose, California in July 1982.

Commentators included play-by-play announcers Eddie Doucette, Pete Liebengood, and Al Trautwig and color commentators Mike Durbin and Earl Anthony.
