= NBC Sports on USA Network =

Sports broadcasts on USA Network

- Network: USA Network (2007–2025)
- Launched: April 8, 2007; 19 years ago
- Closed: November 12, 2025; 12 months ago
- Country of origin: United States
- Owner: NBC Sports Group NBCUniversal Cable Entertainment
- Key people: Richard Cordella (Chairman, NBC Sports Group); Mark Lazarus (CEO, Versant)
- Headquarters: 30 Rockefeller Plaza, New York City
- Major broadcasting contracts: NCAAM; EPL; NASCAR; Olympics; WWE
- Sister network: NBC Sports
- Format: Sports
- Official website: nbcsports.com

Following the dissolution of USA Sports into NBC Sports after the 2007 Masters, USA Network began deemphasizing sports. During this time NBC Sports properties generally only aired on USA in special cases, such as during the Olympics, Stanley Cup Playoffs (until 2021) or the final week of the English Premier League season.

On January 22, 2021, an internal memo sent by NBC Sports president Pete Bevacqua announced that NBCSN would cease operations by the end of the year, and that USA Network would begin "carrying and/or simulcasting certain NBC Sports programming," including the Stanley Cup Playoffs (until 2021), and NASCAR races, before NBCSN's shutdown. The move was cited by industry analysts as a response to the impact of the COVID-19 pandemic on the sports and television industries, the acceleration of cord-cutting, as well as formidable competition from rival sports networks such as ESPN and Fox Sports 1, noting the company saw an overall revenue drop by 19% to $6.72 billion.

On November 20, 2024, Comcast announced that it would spin off most of its cable networks and select digital properties into a new publicly traded company, Versant, a move that will see USA Network split from NBC Sports. Despite the announcement, NBC Sports produced programming such as the 2026 Winter Olympics will continue to air on USA Network even after the spin-off.

== History ==
=== USA Sports (2004–2007) ===
In 2003, General Electric (GE) agreed to merge NBC and its sibling companies with Vivendi Universal's North American-based filmed entertainment assets, including Universal Pictures and Universal Television Group in a multibillion-dollar purchase, renaming the merged company NBC Universal. GE retained an 80% ownership stake in NBC Universal, while Vivendi retained a 20% stake. NBC Universal officially took over as owner of USA and its sibling cable channels (except for Newsworld International) in 2004. USA Sports continued to be used as the branding for coverage of the PGA Tour, The Masters, the Ryder Cup, and the US Open tennis tournament.

In early 2006, it was announced that USA was outbid by Golf Channel for its early-round PGA Tour rights, with USA's final season being 2006. NBC Universal traded away USA's Friday Ryder Cup coverage through 2012 to ESPN for the rights to sign Al Michaels for its new Sunday Night Football. However, USA did renew its Masters contract for an additional year. USA would televise the 2007 Masters before being outbid by ESPN for future coverage. Also in 2006, USA carried some coverage of top level hockey by cooperating with NBC's coverage of ice hockey at the Winter Olympics.

=== Special cases (2007–2021) ===
After USA Sports was dissolved into NBC Sports after the 2007 Masters, USA Network began deemphasizing sports. During this time NBC Sports properties generally only aired on USA in special cases, such as during the Olympics, Stanley Cup Playoffs or the final week of the English Premier League season.

USA Network offered daily coverage of the 2008 Summer Olympics through NBC Sports. This would be the USA Network's last Summer Olympics until 2020 because in 2011, Comcast acquired majority control of NBC's parent company NBC Universal from General Electric. This included to rebranding of Versus as NBC Sports Network, which would replace USA Network's summer Olympic coverage.

The Ryder Cup contract, which stipulated cable coverage air on USA, was still controlled by NBC even after it granted ESPN the rights to Friday cable coverage (normally the only day of the event covered on cable). However, in 2010, rain on Friday pushed the singles matches to Monday, necessitating that they air on cable. With NBC having granted only Friday rights to ESPN, the singles matches aired on USA. Four months later, NBC merged with Golf Channel, making Golf Channel NBC's primary cable outlet for golf.

USA Network returned to NBC Sports' Winter Olympics coverage in 2010, which has continued every year since. In 2010, USA aired 41 hours of coverage; in 2014, it aired 43 hours of coverage; in 2018, it aired 40.5 hours of coverage.

As part of a 2011 contract renewal, Comcast's properties earned exclusive national rights for all Stanley Cup playoffs through 2021. Because NBC and NBC Sports Network cannot carry all of the games on those two outlets alone in the first two rounds, other Comcast properties would need to be used; USA was initially not used, due to the risk of preempting its popular prime time lineup, and Comcast instead used CNBC and NHL Network as the overflow channels for the first four years of the contract. In 2015, Comcast announced that USA would carry some games in the first two rounds of the Stanley Cup Playoffs, mainly on Tuesday and Wednesday nights, returning the NHL to USA for the first time in 30 years since 1985.

USA also aired a limited number of Premier League matches during this time. In 2014, due to NBCSN's coverage of the 2014 Winter Olympics, an English Premier League match between Arsenal and Sunderland aired on USA Network. In the 2015–16 season, USA Network aired 40 matches from the English Premier League, most during the 10AM ET window. These matches moved to CNBC for the 2016–17 season. In 2017, during the final day of the Premier League season on May 21, USA aired a match between Watford and Manchester City. In 2018, USA would air the same match for the final day of the season on May 10. In 2019, during the final day of the Premier League season on May 12, USA aired a match between Manchester United and Cardiff City. In 2020, during the final day of the Premier League season on July 26, USA aired a match between Chelsea and Wolverhampton. In 2021, during the final day of the Premier League season on May 23, USA aired a match between Aston Villa and Chelsea. Later in 2021, USA Network aired Cristiano Ronaldo's return to Manchester United on September 11 when Manchester United took on Newcastle.

On January 26, 2016, NASCAR announced that the Cheez-It 355 at the Glen from Watkins Glen International would air on USA Network due to NBC and NBCSN's commitments to the Summer Olympics.

USA Network returned to NBC Sports' Summer Olympics coverage in 2021. That year, USA Network had 388.5 hours of coverage. The main sports featured were swimming, track and field, diving, beach volleyball, volleyball, cycling, triathlon, team sports basketball, soccer and water polo.

USA Network aired a limited number of NBC Sports's Notre Dame college football coverage in 2020. USA carried the September 19 college football game between the Notre Dame Fighting Irish and University of South Florida Bulls. It was the first Notre Dame football game broadcast on USA; sister network NBC had owned the rights to every Fighting Irish home game since 1991. It was also the first American football game broadcast on the network since World Bowl '92. Notre Dame's double-overtime win against Clemson on November 7, 2020, was moved temporarily to USA Network, due to coverage of Joe Biden's acceptance speech after being declared consensus winner of the 2020 presidential election.

=== Cable home of NBC Sports (2022–2025) ===
Following the closure of NBCSN in January 2022, Atlantic 10 men and women college basketball games were moved to USA, along with weekend lead-in coverage of the U.S. Open, U.S. Women's Open, British Open and AIG Women's Open, the cable portion of NBC Sports' NASCAR contract, the cable portion of NBC Sports' NTT IndyCar Series contract, the cable portion of NBC Sports' IMSA contract, select AMA Supercross Championship races (split with CNBC), and regular Premier League matches, as well as Premier League Mornings.

For the 2022 Winter Olympics, USA Network gained the de facto cable rights to the games, also inherited from the defunct NBCSN. The network featured 400 hours of Olympic programming, broadcasting all Olympic sports.

In April 2022, USA Network became NBC Sports' cable home for United States Football League (USFL) coverage, which it announced it would not continue after the 2023 season. In 2023, NBC Sports produced overnight coverage of Day 1, while Day 2 of the Ryder Cup returned to USA for the first time since 2010.

On July 25, 2024, NBC Sports announced an 11-year deal with the National Basketball Association (NBA) and Women's National Basketball Association (WNBA) beginning in 2025 and 2026 respectively. USA Network would air select games from the WNBA and serve as an overflow outlet for the NBA, as regularly scheduled NBA games have been assigned only to NBC and Peacock. USA Network also acquired the rights to the college basketball NBA HBCU Classic. NBC Sports also announced an 11-year deal with USA Basketball. The agreement included the rights to the USA Basketball Showcase and the Nike Hoop Summit, both of which were slated to air on USA Network.

On November 20, 2024, Comcast announced that it would spin off most of its cable networks and select digital properties into a new publicly traded company, Versant, a move that will see USA Network split from NBC Sports. When asked about the impact of the spin-off, NBC Sports president Rick Cordell stated that the division would "fulfill every obligation" it has with networks that are part of the spin-off (such as USA Network and Golf Channel), implicating they will still carry NBC Sports programming covered under current contracts (such as the Olympic Games, PGA Tour and WNBA).

=== Versant spin-off (since late 2025) ===
On August 12, 2025, Versant announced a broadcasting agreement with United States Golf Association, a first for the company, through 2032. Through the agreement, USA Network will hold the rights to 35 hours of coverage from the U.S. Open and U.S. Women's Open.

Later in August, Versant announced that sports programming on USA Network and Golf Channel would merge under the returning USA Sports brand when the spinoff completes.

In September, Versant announced a new agreement with the WNBA for 50 regular season games, along with select playoff games. The new deal essentially replaces USA's portion of the previously announced deal between the WNBA and NBC. Also in September, Versant announced an agreement with League One Volleyball to broadcast a "match of the week" on USA Network on Wednesday nights beginning in January 2026. USA Network will also air prime-time coverage of the league's playoffs, including the 2026 LOVB Championship Match.

Despite the separation, which officially began in 2025 with Versant situated as a subsidiary of Comcast until the spin-off to shareholders takes place, USA Network continued to air NBC Sports produced programming that year, including United States qualifiers for the 2026 Winter Olympics. In November 2025, USA Network and NBC Sports confirmed an agreement was in place to allow NBC Sports produced coverage of the 2026 Winter Olympics to air on USA.

== Programming ==
=== Current programs ===
- Olympics on USA (2008–present)
  - Summer Olympics (2008, 2020–present, quadrennial)
  - Winter Olympics (2010–present, quadrennial)
- Premier League on NBC (2013–present)
  - Survival Sunday (2013–present)
  - Weekly matches (2015−2016, 2022–present)
  - Occasional matches (2014, 2021)
- Thoroughbred Racing on NBC (2022–present)
  - Breeders' Cup World Championships

=== Former programs ===
- College Basketball on USA (1982–1988, 2022–2025)
  - Atlantic 10 men's and women's regular season contests
  - Atlantic 10 men's tournament, second round and quarterfinals
- Golf on USA (2010, 2022–2025)
  - Ryder Cup (2010, 2023, 2025)
  - U.S. Open (2022–2025)
  - U.S. Women's Open (2022–2025)
  - The Open Championship (2022–2025)
  - AIG Women's Open (2022–2025)
- U.S. Open Tennis Championship (2008)
- NHL on NBC (2015–2021; select playoff games)
- College Football on USA (2020)
- Boston Marathon (2022)
- Tour de France (2022–2023)
- United States Football League (2022–2023)
- IndyCar Series on USA (2022–2024)
  - Detroit Grand Prix (2022, 2024)
  - Bommarito Automotive Group 500 (2022, 2024)
  - Grand Prix of Road America (2023)
  - Indy 200 at Mid-Ohio (2023)
  - Gallagher Grand Prix (2023)
  - Grand Prix of Long Beach (2024)
  - Grand Prix of Portland (2024)
  - IndyCar Series at the Milwaukee Mile (2024)
- Thoroughbred Racing on NBC (2022)
  - Black-Eyed Susan Stakes
  - Kentucky Oaks
- Westminster Kennel Club Dog Show (1984–2016)
- NASCAR on NBC (2016 (one race), 2022–2025 (full cable coverage))
  - Cheez-It 355 at the Glen (2016)
- WWE (1985–2000, 2005–present)
  - Prime Time Wrestling (1985–1993)
  - Monday Night Raw (1993–2000, 2005–2024)
  - NXT (2019–2024)
  - Friday Night SmackDown (2015–2019, 2024–present)
- IMSA (2022–2025)
- World Figure Skating Championships (2022–2026)
- World Track and Field Championships (2022–2025)
- AMA Supercross Championship (2022–2025)
- AMA Motocross Championship (2023–present)
- Nike Hoop Summit (2025)
- FIS Alpine Ski World Cup (2025)

== See also ==
- CNBC#Sports
- USA Network#Sports programming
