= NHL on USA =

NHL hockey cable telecasts (1979–1985)

- The logo for USA Network's regular season telecasts on Monday nights in 1983.
- Also known as: USA Network Monday Night NHL; USA Network Stanley Cup Playoffs; USA Network Special Edition NHL; USA Network NHL
- Genre: Sports
- Created by: USA Network Sports
- Directed by: Henry Irizawa
- Starring: See list of commentators section
- Country of origin: United States
- Original language: English
- No. of seasons: 6

Production
- Executive producer: Jim Zrake
- Producer: Mark D. Stulberger
- Camera setup: Multi-camera
- Running time: 180 minutes

Original release
- Network: USA Network
- Release: 1979 – May 30, 1985

Related
- NHL on NBC (Select first two rounds of Stanley Cup; select third round Stanley Cup games in 2020 and 2021); NHL on NBC; NHL on Versus

The NHL on USA was the de facto title of a television show that broadcast National Hockey League games on the USA Network from 1979 to May 30, 1985.

== History ==
=== Before the USA Network came to be (1969–1980) ===
==== Manhattan Cable and HBO (1969–1977) ====
Manhattan Cable (subsequently referred to as the MSG Network) debuted in the spring of 1969 and did all home events from the Madison Square Garden: New York Knicks basketball, New York Rangers hockey, college basketball, horse shows, Golden Gloves boxing, tennis, the Westminster Dog Show, ice capades, professional wrestling, etc. The first reference to the channel as “MSG Network” was sometime around 1971–72, although the name did not become official until 1977.

The first televised events were NHL and NBA playoffs in the spring of 1969; in those playoffs Marty Glickman did play-by-play for the Knicks broadcasts while Win Elliott did play-by-play for the Rangers.

Meanwhile, HBO began simulcasting some MSG games in 1972 beginning with the Rangers/Vancouver Canucks game on November 8, 1972 (the first ever program televised on HBO, to a few subscribers in Wilkes-Barre, PA). 1974–75 marked the only year in which HBO used MSG announcers for their feed. Because HBO is a premium cable service, this created a burden on announcers to fill in dead airtime on HBO while commercials aired on MSG Network. HBO did not broadcast Knicks or Rangers games after the 1976–77 season.

==== UA-Columbia (1977–1980) ====
When the MSG/HBO marriage ended in 1977, Madison Square Garden proceeded to seek a new partner to launch a national network to show off its events. So for several years, beginning with the 1977–78 season, all MSG home events (such as those involving the Knicks, Rangers, etc.) were then televised on a fledgling network that would eventually become known as the USA Network. This channel, which debuted on September 22, 1977, was a continuation of the existing MSG Network. The key difference, however, was that it was now nationally syndicated via satellite rather than terrestrially. It was also the first cable channel to be supported by advertising revenues. By this time (as previously alluded to), the channel was officially called the “Madison Square Garden Network” or MSG Network.

In 1979–80, the National Hockey League replaced their syndicated coverage package The NHL Network with a package on USA. At the time, the USA Network was called UA-Columbia. As the immediate forerunner for the USA Network, UA-Columbia, served as the cable syndicated arm of not only MSG Network in New York, but also PRISM channel in Philadelphia, and whatever pay/cable outlets were around in 1979.

==== The formation of the USA Network ====
On April 9, 1980, the Madison Square Garden Network changed its name to the USA Network. This occurred when the ownership structure was reorganized under a joint operating agreement by the UA-Columbia Cablevision cable system (now known as Cablevision Systems Corporation) and MCA (then the parent of Universal Studios, now owned by NBC Universal). Things took a step further one year later when Time Inc. (which eventually merged with Warner Communications to form Time Warner) and Paramount Pictures Corp. (then a division of Gulf+Western, now owned by Viacom) took minority ownership stakes in the USA. G+W also owned the New York Rangers and the MSG regional sports television network (both later owned by Cablevision, but spun off in 2010).

=== Coverage overview (1979–1985) ===
As previously mentioned USA's (or UA-Columbia as it was known at the time) coverage begin in the 1979–80 season as a Monday night series with Dan Kelly doing play-by-play alongside a variety of commentators including Pete Stemkowski, Lou Nanne, and Brian McFarlane. Scott Wahle was the intermission host.

==== 1980–81 season ====
For the 1980–81 season, some Sunday night games were added. Dan Kelly once again, did most of the play-by-play alongside Mike Eruzione. Dick Carlson and Jiggs McDonald also did play-by-play work on occasion. In addition, Don Cherry was a commentator for at least one game. Meanwhile, Jim West was the host for most games.

With USA's coverage of the 1981 Stanley Cup playoffs, it marked the first time that there was "blanket" American television coverage of the NHL playoffs. In other words, more often, whenever a game was played it was televised on a national outlet (whether it was broadcast or cable). USA however, did not televise Game 1 of the playoff series between Philadelphia Flyers and Calgary Flames (April 16) because they were instead broadcasting a baseball game between the Pittsburgh Pirates and Philadelphia Phillies. Meanwhile, they also skipped Games 2–6 (on April 17, 22, and 24) of the Philadelphia–Calgary series because of their coverage of the NBA playoffs. USA also missed Games 2 and 5 of the playoff series between the Calgary Flames and Minnesota North Stars (April 30 and May 7 respectively) because of baseball games involving the Minnesota Twins vs. the Boston Red Sox and the Los Angeles Dodgers vs. the Philadelphia Phillies respectively.

==== 1981–82 season ====
In the 1981–82 season, Al Trautwig took over as studio host. Dan Kelly did play-by-play with either Gary Green or Rod Gilbert on color commentary. For the playoffs, Dick Carlson and Al Albert were added as play-by-play voices of some games. Meanwhile, Jim Van Horne hosted Stanley Cup Final games played in Vancouver.

In April 1982, USA outbid ESPN for the NHL's American national television cable package with $8 million (at least $2 million more than what ESPN was offering).

==== 1982–83 and 1983–84 seasons ====
Things pretty much remained the same for USA during the 1982–83 season. Dan Kelly and Gary Green called most games, while Al Albert did play-by-play or hosted on several playoff games, including two games of the Stanley Cup Final from Nassau Coliseum. USA didn't cover any playoff games on April 7, 1983, because they were broadcasting second-round highlights of The Masters. This was followed by a West Coast NBA telecast.

In the 1983–84 season, USA covered over 40 games including the playoffs. While Gary Green did all games, Dan Kelly and Al Albert did roughly 20 games each. Meanwhile, Jiggs McDonald helped broadcast at least one game.

Because the USA Network was airing Masters highlights, Game 1 of the 1984 playoff series between the Minnesota North Stars and St. Louis Blues (April 12) and Game 2 of the playoff series between the New York Islanders and Washington Capitals (April 13) were aired on tape delay at 10 p.m. Eastern Time.

==== 1984–85 season ====
For USA's final full season of NHL coverage in 1984–85, Dan Kelly and Gary Green once again, did most games, while Al Albert and Green called the rest. In all, the USA Network covered about 55 games, including 33 in the regular season. Also, Hartford Whalers goaltender Mike Liut was added as a studio analyst for the Stanley Cup Final.

Meanwhile, for increased publicity opportunities, the Stroh Brewing Company turned to such sports as hockey—which had been overlooked by Anheuser and Miller—and sponsored broadcasts of National Hockey League games on the USA cable network.

Seldom during the early rounds of the playoffs did USA carry an away game of one of the three New York-area teams (New York Rangers, New York Islanders, or New Jersey Devils) since WOR-TV New York, at the time available on most of the nation's cable television systems, often carried that away game of the New York-area team both locally in New York and on its "superstation" feed. One exception was a playoff game between two of the New York-area clubs, since WOR was usually barred from carrying it since the home team's cable-television contract superseded the visiting club's over-the-air television deal.

=== Between 1985 and 2015 ===
After the 1984–85 season, the NHL Board of Governors chose to have the USA Network and ESPN submit sealed bids. ESPN won by bidding nearly $25 million for three years, about twice as much as the USA Network had been paying. The contract called for ESPN to air up to 33 regular season games each season, the NHL All-Star game, and the Stanley Cup playoffs.

After the USA Network lost the rights to the NHL to ESPN, they largely abandoned sports after the early 1990s as the channel shifted almost exclusively to scripted entertainment. Beginning in 2006, USA began carrying some coverage of top level hockey by cooperating with NBC's coverage of ice hockey at the Winter Olympics in 2006, 2010, and 2014; these games were mostly daytime contests that would not preempt the network's increasingly popular prime time programs.

=== Selected early-round playoff games, 2015–2021 ===
As part of a 2011 contract renewal, Comcast's properties earned exclusive national rights for all Stanley Cup playoffs through 2021. Because NBC and NBC Sports Network cannot carry all of the games on those two outlets alone, other Comcast properties would need to be used; USA was initially not used, due to the risk of preempting its popular prime time lineup, and the company instead used CNBC and NHL Network as the overflow channels for the first four years of the contract. In 2015, Comcast announced that the USA Network would carry some games in the first two rounds of the Stanley Cup Playoffs, mainly on Tuesday and Wednesday nights, returning the NHL to USA Network for the first time since 1985.

On January 22, 2021, an internal memo sent by NBC Sports president Pete Bevacqua announced that NBCSN would cease operations by the end of the year, and that USA Network would begin "carrying and/or simulcasting certain NBC Sports programming," including the Stanley Cup playoffs and NASCAR races, before NBCSN's shutdown. Peacock, NBCUniversal's new streaming service, will also carry some of the network's former programming starting in 2022. The move was cited by industry analysts as a response to the impact of the COVID-19 pandemic on the sports and television industries, the acceleration of cord-cutting, as well as formidable competition from rival sports networks such as ESPN and Fox Sports 1.

But with the NBC Sports contract expiring at the end of the 2020–21 season, the league desired to split its U.S. national media rights between multiple broadcasters. On March 10, 2021, the NHL announced that ESPN/ABC would serve as one of the new rightsholders under a seven-year contract. Its deal included 25 regular season games for ESPN and ABC (including opening night, the All-Star Game, and other special events), 75 exclusively telecasts and all out-of-market games on ESPN+, rights to half of the Stanley Cup playoffs, first choice of conference finals, and four Stanley Cup Final over the length of the contract. On April 26, 2021, Sports Business Journal reported that NBC had officially pulled out of bidding for future NHL rights. The next day, Turner Sports announced that they had agreed to a seven-year deal to be the other NHL rightsholder, including up to 72 regular season games including the Winter Classic, the other half of the Stanley Cup playoffs, and three Stanley Cup Final. Analysts believed that once ESPN obtained not only more Stanley Cup Final (four out of three) than NBC desired but also overall hockey content, it was not worth spending more money on a smaller package in contrast to what they were last paying the NHL.

== List of commentators ==
=== Play-by-play ===
- Dan Kelly (1979–85)
- Al Albert (1981–85)
- Dick Carlson (1980–82)
- Jiggs McDonald (1980–84)
- Mike Lange (1984 Stanley Cup playoffs)

=== Color commentary ===
- Don Cherry (1980–81)
- Mike Eruzione (1980–81)
- Phil Esposito (1980–81)
- Rod Gilbert (1981–82)
- Gary Green (1981–85)
- Brian McFarlane (1979–80)
- Lou Nanne (1979–80)
- Pete Stemkowski (1979–80)

=== Studio hosts ===
- Al Albert (1982–83)
- Al Trautwig (1981–85)
- Jim Van Horne (1981–82)
- Scott Wahle (1979–80)
- Jim West (1980–82)
- Jim Hughson (1984)

=== Studio analysts ===
- Mike Liut (1985 Stanley Cup Final)

Preceded by None	NHL pay television carrier in the United States; 1979 – 1985	Succeeded by ESPN
