= Tennis on USA =

- Created by: USA Network Sports
- Starring: See list of commentators
- No. of episodes: N/A

Production
- Running time: 180 minutes or until tournament ends

Original release
- Network: USA Network
- Release: 1984 – 2008

Tennis on USA is a television program produced by the USA Network that broadcasts the main professional tennis tournaments in the United States.

== Overview ==
The network was the longtime cable home of the US Open, which moved to ESPN2 and the Tennis Channel as of 2009. Universal HD provided the high definition simulcast of USA Network's coverage of the US Open tennis tournament in 2006 and 2007.

From 1994–2001 (before ESPN, ESPN2 and ESPN Classic took over), USA was also the American cable home of the French Open.

=== Promotional campaigns ===
In his post-NFL coaching career, former Philadelphia Eagles and New York Jets head coach Rich Kotite has been seen in a promotional commercial for USA Network's coverage of the US Open Tennis championships.

== Commentators ==
- Steve Alvarez
- Julie Anthony
- Tracy Austin - Since retiring as a player, Austin has worked as a commentator for NBC and the USA Network for the French Open and the US Open. She worked for the Seven Network, who broadcast the Australian Open and usually participates in the BBC's Wimbledon coverage. She began working for Tennis Channel in 2010 and joined their US Open team and later their Australian Open team in 2012. Austin has also worked for Canadian television for their coverage of the Rogers Cup since 2004.
- Michael Barkann - He served as a field reporter for USA Network's coverage of the U.S. Open Tennis Championships from 1991-2008.
- Mary Carillo - Carillo began her television career working for USA Network from 1980 through 1987. At the 2004 Athens Games, Carillo earned critical praise in her debut as a full-time Olympic host on Bravo's coverage in addition to anchoring USA Network's live, Grand Slam-style coverage of the tennis gold medal finals.
- Jim Courier - Since his retirement as a top-level player, Courier has served as a tennis analyst and commentator for the USA Network, NBC Sports, TNT, ITV and the Seven Network. Since 2005, Courier has headed the commentary for the host broadcaster of the Australian Open, The Seven Network. Since the 2019 Australian Open, Courier is now the main commentator for the Nine Network broadcast team after a new TV rights deal. Courier calls all centre court men's singles matches for the network. He also conducts the post match on-court interviews with the winning player. Courier started working with the British channel ITV for the French Open in 2012.
- Vitas Gerulaitis
- Bill Macatee - From 1990 until 2006, he anchored coverage of the PGA Tour on the USA Network. His other duties have included play-by-play for the U.S. Open Tennis Championship, the French Open at Roland Garros, boxing, figure skating, and other sports specials.
- Barry MacKay (tennis) - Starting in the 1970s, MacKay became a tennis broadcaster. Over his broadcasting career, MacKay teamed with Arthur Ashe, Bud Collins, Donald Dell, Billie Jean King, Martina Navratilova, Jimmy Connors, Chris Evert, John McEnroe, Pam Shriver, Tracy Austin, and Leif Shiras. He was the on-air voice for American broadcasts of the U.S. Open, Wimbledon, French Open, Australian Open, and many ATP and WTA tournaments. He also provided color commentary, play-by-play, and lead analysis for The Tennis Channel and DirecTV tennis coverage. He spent 30 years broadcasting Wimbledon for HBO and the US Open on the USA Network. He provided color commentary on Fox Sports Network, and served as the play-by-play announcer for the NBC Sports coverage of tennis at the 2008 Summer Olympics in China.
- John McEnroe - He now works as a sports commentator in tennis and has regularly appeared in US national telecasts of Grand Slam tennis matches on such networks as CBS, NBC, USA, and ESPN, as has his brother Patrick. He also commentates on Wimbledon for the BBC in the UK.
- Jimmy Roberts
- Ted Robinson - He broadcast the US Open for 22 years on USA Network, receiving acclaim for his partnership with John McEnroe, which continues on NBC and Tennis Channel.
- Al Trautwig - From 2005–2008, he co-anchored USA Network's coverage of the US Open tennis tournament.
