= USA Tuesday Night Fights =

- Directed by: Anthony Giordano; Lenny Stucker
- Starring: Al Albert; Angelo Dundee (1982–1984); Randy Gordon (1984–1987); Sean O'Grady (1987–1998)
- Country of origin: United States
- Original language: English

Production
- Running time: 120 minutes
- Production company: USA Network

Original release
- Release: October 1, 1982 – August 25, 1998

USA Tuesday Night Fights (also known as Friday Night Boxing, Wednesday Night Fights, and Thursday Night Fights) is a television boxing show. It aired from October 1, 1982, to August 25, 1998, on the USA Network; at one time it was the longest-running boxing show on television. The show debuted on October 1, 1982, and was originally called Friday Night Boxing, which aired from 1982 to 1984, and then in 1984, the boxing program moved to Wednesday nights and was called Wednesday Night Fights, which aired from 1984 to 1986, and in 1986, the boxing program moved to Thursday nights, and was called Thursday Night Fights, which aired from 1986 to 1990. In 1987, the boxing program finally moved to Tuesday nights, and the show was called Tuesday Night Fights.

USA Tuesday Night Fights was hosted by Al Albert, who co-hosted with boxing commentaries, first by Muhammad Ali trainer Angelo Dundee, who co-hosted with Albert from 1982 to 1984, and then, by Randy Gordon, who co-hosted with Albert from 1984 to 1987, and finally, by former champion Sean O'Grady, who co-hosted with Albert from 1987 until the show's ending in 1998. Bill Macatee was often a substitute commentator for Albert. The show did not employ a regular ring announcer, but several high-profile announcers such as HBO's Michael Buffer, Showtime's Jimmy Lennon, Jr., Philadelphia boxing staple Ed Derian, and future BattleBots announcer Mark Beiro were featured with Derian and Beiro featured more frequently as the years went on.

The program was sponsored by Budweiser, and often referred to on air as Budweiser Presents USA Tuesday Night Fights. Pabst Blue Ribbon was also a sponsor of the program, continuing a tradition of the Pabst company sponsoring televised boxing matches. Like some of its similar fellow boxing programs, Tuesday Night Fights did not always emanate from large arenas. Instead, cards usually took place in smaller venues, such as The Blue Horizon in Philadelphia, the Felt Forum/Paramount Theater at Madison Square Garden in New York, or the ballroom of Casino Magic in Bay St. Louis, Mississippi. Tuesday Night Fights would also not limit itself to American venues, as they traveled to England, Mexico, and other places to televise shows. One show even took place aboard an aircraft carrier.

== Notable fights ==
Few world title fights were presented in this show, one of the notable ones being when Vinny Pazienza, a former world Lightweight champion, moved up in weight and captured the WBA world Jr. Middleweight championship with an eleventh-round knockout of Gilbert Dele. Pazienza would ultimately relinquish the title following a car accident the following year. Written off from boxing by doctors after the accident, Pazienza would return to the ring with a win over Luis Santana, a fight which also aired on Tuesday Night Fights.

Another title fight aired by USA was the 1988 IBF featherweight title bout between defending champion Calvin Grove and contender Jorge Paez that took place in Mexicali, Mexico. The fight was significant in that it was the last ever title match scheduled for 15 rounds. The fight went the distance, with Paez earning a majority decision.

On March 19, 1996, USA featured a bout between Jeremy Williams and Arthur Weathers as the headline of their show broadcast from the Spruce Goose Dome in Williams' home of Long Beach, California. Williams, at the time a rising heavyweight contender, dropped Weathers with an uppercut almost immediately after the bell rang to start the contest and referee Marty Denkin called a halt to the contest after ten seconds, which was erroneously referred to as a world record for quickest knockout (although it remains one of the fastest ever).

On March 18, 1997, USA saw what is officially the world's quickest knockout. The bout between heavyweights Jimmy Thunder and Crawford Grimsley lasted only 1.5 seconds after Thunder caught Grimsley with a right hook to the head that sent him to the canvas.

Both George Foreman and Larry Holmes were frequently featured on Tuesday Night Fights as they began to return after their initial retirements. Both fighters' comeback fights were aired on USA, and Holmes fought on a semi-regular basis on the program until he declared, on air, in 1996 that he would not likely fight again unless he could secure a title match.

A future opponent of Holmes, Butterbean, received some of his earliest exposure as a professional fighter by fighting several four rounders on Tuesday Night Fights.

Roberto Durán was another fixture on Tuesday Night Fights later in his career, and his 100th professional bout was carried by USA.

Tuesday Night Fights also showcased the bizarre from time to time. Among these was a fight from former pro football star Mark Gastineau's controversial boxing career which saw him lose to a journeyman fighter, Andrew Golota's infamous fight against Samson Po'uha in 1995 which saw the Polish fighter, who appeared frequently on Tuesday Night Fights, bite the neck of his opponent, a fight between Riddick Bowe and Elijah Tillery where Tillery was disqualified for kicking the future world champion and Bowe responded by knocking him out of the ring, and a bizarre fight between Sharmba Mitchell and Bazooka Limon where the former champion Limon pulled Mitchell's trunks down during the action.

=== Other world champions to fight on the show ===
Many other world champions fought on this show, whether as prospects or later in their careers. This included names such as Oscar de La Hoya, Floyd Mayweather Jr., Roy Jones Jr., Arturo Gatti, Fernando Vargas, Hector Camacho, Tony Tubbs and Antonio Tarver. Pay Per View bouts were also rebroadcast on the show such as Julio César Chávez's eighth-round knockout win over Joey Gamache, which was televised by the show, but as a Pay Per View feature only.

== Cancellation ==
On April 9, 1998, USA Network founder Kay Koplovitz, who served as head of the USA Network since 1977 and who was instrumental in the USA Network's programming structure, left the network, with new overall USA Network owner Barry Diller taking her positions as chairman and CEO. After taking Koplovitiz's CEO position, Diller made plans to cut at least $40 million from the USA Network's massive budget, which had been criticized for overspending on content which was not deemed feasible. In August 1998, USA Tuesday Night Fights was cancelled after programming changes were made and budget cuts reduced the ability to broadcast fights.

== Rebroadcasts ==
In June 2006, CSI Sports, through its FIGHT SPORTS division, began airing a compilation of some of the best knockouts from the Tuesday Night Fights series titled USA Tuesday Night Fights: Knockouts! on pay-per-view. Narrated by Washington Redskins play-by-play man Larry Michael, the sixty-minute series featured various fights from throughout the years. One of the segments featured on the show was called "In Case You Missed It...", this segment featured some memorable moments from "Tuesday Night Fights", another segment called "KO Time", featuring very quick knockouts that were a big hit with the fans, and "Who Won This One?", the segment features the last fight of the program. It is promoted several times during the broadcast, and viewers are encouraged to pick which of the two men won the bout.. Reruns of this series air across the country on various sports channels, including MSG Plus.

The Tuesday Night Fights: Knockouts! series was also released on DVD in a two-volume box set.

CSI later came out with a series called Wide World of Fights, which has a much broader scope and includes mixed martial arts, kickboxing, and other combat sports footage in addition to some of the fights that were originally part of the Tuesday Night Fights compilation series. This series also airs on many of the same stations that carry Tuesday Night Fights: Knockouts!. CSI also airs old episodes of Tuesday Night Fights as part of its Fight Sports World Championship Boxing series, which rebroadcasts fights from the past.
