= USA Network Thursday Night Baseball =

- 1983 logo
- Genre: Sport
- Developed by: USA Sports
- Directed by: Bob Hiestand; John Repczynski
- Starring: See announcers section
- Country of origin: United States
- Original language: English

Production
- Executive producers: Kay Koplovitz; Jim Zrake
- Producers: Jerry Romano; Mark D. Stulberger; Jim Zrake
- Running time: 180 minutes (or until game ends)

Original release
- Network: USA
- Release: April 26, 1979 – September 29, 1983

Related
- Thursday Night Baseball; Major League Baseball on NBC

USA Network Thursday Night Baseball aired Major League Baseball (MLB) games on the USA Network from April 26, 1979 to September 29, 1983.

== Background ==
In 1979, 22 teams (all but the Atlanta Braves, Houston Astros, New York Mets, and St. Louis Cardinals) participated in a one-year cable deal with United Artists Television and Columbia Pictures Television, then-owners of the USA Network. The deal involved the airing of Thursday night games in markets at least 50 miles (80 km) from a major league park. The deal earned Major League Baseball less than $500,000, but led to a new two-year contract for 40–45 games per season. The program ran through the 1983 season.

With USA's Thursday night coverage, it ended the position of ABC's Monday night broadcasts as the exclusive national, prime time television franchise for Major League Baseball.

== Coverage history ==
The series began April 26, 1979 with a doubleheader: Cleveland at Kansas City (Jim Woods and Bud Harrelson announcing) followed by Baltimore at California (Monte Moore and Maury Wills announcing). The second game of the night was typically broadcast from the West Coast. The games were usually blacked-out in the competing teams' cities. Once in a while, when USA aired a repeat of the telecast late at night, local cities were allowed to show the rerun.

From 1980 to 1981, Jim Woods and Nelson Briles (replacing Bud Harrelson) broadcast the early games, while Monte Moore and Wes Parker (replacing Maury Wills) called the late game.

In 1982, doubleheaders did not start until June 17. Prior to the doubleheaders starting, Monte Moore and Wes Parker did the individual game until then. When the doubleheaders finally began, Moore and Parker moved over to the late game for the rest of the year. Meanwhile, Eddie Doucette (replacing Jim Woods) and Nelson Briles were assigned to call the early game.

USA continued with the plan of not starting doubleheaders until June in the final year of the package in 1983. Steve Zabriskie and Al Albert filled in for Eddie Doucette in September 1982 (Steve Grad also occasionally substituted) while Albert replaced Doucette for a game or more in 1983.

USA's coverage became a casualty of the new $1.2 billion TV contract between Major League Baseball, ABC and NBC beginning in 1984 and lasting through 1989. One of the provisions to the new deal was that local telecasts opposite network games had to be eliminated.

=== Memorable moments ===
One particular game of note was a Los Angeles Dodgers–St. Louis Cardinals game in 1981 (the last game before the strike). The game in question featured Fernando Valenzuela picking up his eighth consecutive win to start the season. Valenzuela gave up a home run in the ninth to tie the game 1–1, but Pedro Guerrero hit one himself in the bottom of the ninth for the win.

One year later, during a September 16 game between the San Diego Padres and the San Francisco Giants, Darrell Evans went 3-for-5 with four RBI in Giants' 9–3 victory.

== Announcers ==
- Al Albert (1982–1983)
- Nelson Briles (1980–1983)
- Eddie Doucette (1982–1983)
- Steve Grad (1982)
- Bud Harrelson (1979)
- Ned Martin (1980)
- Monte Moore (1979–1983)
- Wes Parker (1980–1983)
- Maury Wills (1979)
- Jim Woods (1979–1981)
- Steve Zabriskie (1982–1983)

== See also ==
- Thursday Night Baseball
- NBC Sports on USA Network

Preceded by None	Major League Baseball pay television carrier 1979–1983	Succeeded by ESPN
