= NFL on television in the 1990s =

Broadcasts of American football

On March 12, 1990, at the NFL's annual meeting in Orlando, Florida, the league new ratified four-year television agreements for the 1990 to 1993 seasons involving ABC, CBS, NBC, ESPN and TNT. The contracts totaled US$3.6 billion, the largest package in television history. This contract saw each network having rights to one Super Bowl telecast as part of the package. The fourth Super Bowl (XXVIII) was up for a separate sealed bid. NBC won the bid, and since they were last in the rotation for Super Bowl coverage in the regular contract, ended up with two straight Super Bowls (although they were originally scheduled to broadcast Super Bowl XXVI; CBS instead televised the game as part of a swap with the network). CBS is the only other network to televise two Super Bowls (Super Bowl I and II) in a row. NBC, which had held XXVII (according to the original rotation, NBC would have had XXVI and CBS XXVII, but the NFL allowed the networks to switch the two games in order to allow CBS a significant lead-in to its coverage of the 1992 Winter Olympics), was the only network to bid on XXVIII. Previously, the league alternated the Super Bowl broadcast among its broadcast network partners, except for Super Bowl I; CBS broadcast Super Bowl II, then the league rotated the broadcast between CBS and NBC until 1985 when ABC entered the rotation when that network broadcast Super Bowl XIX.

== Year-by-year breakdown ==
=== 1990 ===
For CBS' coverage of Super Bowl XXIV at the end of the 1989 season, CBS introduced a brand new theme for its NFL broadcasts, using a considerably more traditional and standard (but still peppy and bombastic) theme than the one used the previous four seasons; the theme was used until the 1991 NFC Championship Game.

The game featured the broadcast team of play-by-play announcer Pat Summerall and color commentator John Madden. Brent Musburger hosted all of The Super Bowl Today pregame (2 hours), halftime, and postgame events with help from his NFL Today co-hosts Irv Cross, Dick Butkus, and Will McDonough, along with game analysts Terry Bradshaw, Ken Stabler, and Dan Fouts, and then-Chicago Bears head coach Mike Ditka. CBS Sports reporter Pat O'Brien, meanwhile, was stationed in San Francisco 49ers quarterback Joe Montana's hometown of Monongahela, Pennsylvania.

This was the last NFL broadcast where Musburger and Cross appeared on The NFL Today, which both had been involved with since its 1975 premiere. Shortly before he was to call the 1990 men's Division I college basketball championship game on April 2, 1990, Musburger was fired by CBS management. Cross, meanwhile, was made a color analyst alongside Tim Ryan for two seasons before he left after the 1991 season. In addition, both Butkus and McDonough left the network after this game; McDonough moved to NBC's pregame team while Butkus decided to return to acting and philanthropic work. CBS elected to go with a two-man team for the next year, pulling Bradshaw and Greg Gumbel off of their respective broadcast teams and naming them the new hosts for The NFL Today.

CBS also debuted a new graphical package and theme song for their telecasts. The graphics became part of The NFL Today open while the theme continued to be used on game broadcasts for the next two seasons and replaced the original NFL Today theme, which had been used in remixed form for the 1989 season. The last use of the actual theme was for the 1991 season's NFC Championship game, while a remixed version was used for Super Bowl XXVI's pregame show.

The game drew a national Nielsen rating of 39.0 for CBS, the lowest rating for a Super Bowl game since Super Bowl III in January 1969.

On September 9, 1990, The NFL Today overhauled its talent lineup, consisting of Greg Gumbel, Terry Bradshaw, Pat O'Brien and Lesley Visser. As previously mentioned, Gumbel and Bradshaw replaced Brent Musburger, who was fired by CBS on April 1, 1990, and Irv Cross, who was demoted to the position of game analyst. During the 1990 season, Pat Summerall was hospitalized after vomiting on a plane during a flight after a Bears–Redskins game, and was out for a considerable amount of time. While Verne Lundquist replaced Summerall on games with Madden, Jack Buck (who was at CBS during the time as the network's lead Major League Baseball announcer) was added as a regular NFL broadcaster to fill-in.

TNT televised NFL games from 1990 through the 1997 season. They broadcast Sunday night NFL games during the first half of the season, with ESPN taking over for the second half. TNT got a couple of Thursday night games to show, as ESPN did in the second half (TNT's Thursday night games were aired in place of Sunday night games that would have otherwise conflicted with the World Series). As has always been the case for cable NFL broadcasts, TNT's games were simulcast on regular over-the-air television stations in each participating team's local market so that households without cable television could still see the telecasts.

ESPN anchor Chris Berman referred to TNT's football programming by its original "Nitro" brand, even after TNT abandoned that moniker. (This is not to be confused with the professional wrestling show called WCW Monday Nitro.)

It does not appear that TNT's coverage ever used the title Sunday Night Football, and indeed ESPN filed for a trademark on that title in 1996 (the trademark was later assigned to the NFL, allowing for its eventual use by NBC).

=== 1991 ===
Super Bowl XXV was broadcast in the United States by the American Broadcasting Company (ABC), featuring the Monday Night Football broadcast team of play-by-play announcer Al Michaels and color commentators Frank Gifford and Dan Dierdorf. Brent Musburger hosted all the events with the help of then-ABC Sports analysts Bob Griese and Dick Vermeil, Musburger's regular color commentator on ABC's college football telecasts. Also, sponsors Coca-Cola and Diet Pepsi had to withdraw planned contest promotions or advertisements, due to the Gulf War situation (PepsiCo's contest, a heavily promoted $3 million giveaway in which viewers would be invited to call a toll-free number during the first three quarters; with the caller receiving a Diet Pepsi coupon and an opportunity to win one of 3 prizes totaling $1 million each, was also withdrawn due to FCC and Congressional fears and complaints from the telephone communications industry that the United States telephone system would be overwhelmed).

In the teams' local markets, the game was also broadcast by the local ABC stations in the New York City and Buffalo markets (WABC-TV 7 in New York City and WKBW-TV 7 in Buffalo).

The live Sunday matches of the 1991 Ryder Cup held in late September on NBC were scheduled to end by mid-afternoon in order to allow NBC to cover regional NFL games at 4:00 p.m. Eastern Time.

=== 1992 ===
At Super Bowl XXVI, Lesley Visser became the first female sportscaster to preside over the Vince Lombardi Trophy presentation ceremony. The network's telecast of Super Bowl XXVI on January 26, 1992, was seen by more than 123 million viewers nationally, second only to the 127 million that viewed Super Bowl XX. The ongoing 1990 television contract gave CBS rights to Super Bowl XXVI instead of Super Bowl XXVII, which was in the network's rotation of the champion game. The NFL swapped the years in which CBS and NBC held rights to the Super Bowl in an effort to give CBS enough lead-in programming for the upcoming 1992 Winter Olympics that were set to begin two weeks later. For this game, CBS debuted a new network-wide red, white and blue graphics package as well as a new theme song (composed by Frankie Vinci) for its NFL coverage that replaced the one CBS debuted for their coverage of Super Bowl XXIV two years earlier. The package lasted until the end of 1995, after which CBS discarded it in favor of an orange and yellow color scheme for its sports graphics. The new music lasted until CBS lost the NFL rights at the end of the 1993 season, but continued to be used by CBS Radio until 2002. Several remixed versions of the 1993 theme were used upon the return of the NFL to CBS until the end of the 2002 season, when CBS replaced its entire NFL music package with one composed by E.S. Posthumus.

=== 1993 ===
Super Bowl XXVII was broadcast on television in the United States by NBC. Dick Enberg served as the play-by-play announcer with color commentator Bob Trumpy in the broadcast booth.

Bob Costas hosted all the events with analyst Mike Ditka, who joined NBC almost immediately after he was fired as head coach of the Chicago Bears earlier in January. Other contributors included former Boston Globe sportswriter Will McDonough (assigned to Buffalo's locker room); former Oakland/Los Angeles Raiders tight end Todd Christensen; The Tonight Show host Jay Leno; Cris Collinsworth (participating in an NFL Experience piece with Christensen as well as reporting from the Dallas locker room); former Los Angeles Lakers basketball player Magic Johnson (then working as a commentator for the NBA on NBC; Johnson was assigned to an interview with Dallas Cowboys quarterback Troy Aikman, running back Emmitt Smith and wide receiver Michael Irvin); Paul Maguire; Gayle Gardner; Jim Lampley (who would replace Costas as host of NFL Live for the following season); and Dateline NBC correspondent Deborah Roberts (producing a special report on the Michael Jackson halftime show). Also included was an interview with former New York Jets defensive end Dennis Byrd and his wife Angela in the first one-on-one interview since Byrd suffered a paralyzing neck injury (which he eventually recovered from) suffered in a collision with teammate Scott Mersereau during their game against Kansas City.

In September 1993, The NFL Today celebrated its 19th season as a half-hour pre-game show. It was the highest-rated program in its time slot for 18 years, longer than any other program on television.

Despite having a few successful shows like The X-Files, Fox still lacked credibility among viewers. The network was mostly known for blue-collar family sitcoms like The Simpsons and Married... with Children. Despite so much skepticism about Fox that it had to assure the NFL and reporters that Bart Simpson would not be an announcer, to the surprise and shock of many in the sports and media industries, on December 17, 1993, the NFL selected the bid offered by Fox, in the process stripping CBS of football for the first time since 1956. Fox's coverage, in addition to being able to televise NFC regular season and playoff games, also included the exclusive U.S. television rights to Super Bowl XXXI (held in 1997) under the initial contract, which took effect with the 1994 season.

The steady downturn in programming fortunes that CBS experienced during the tenure of network president Laurence Tisch (brother of New York Giants co-owner Bob Tisch) would precipitate in 1993. As the television contracts for both NFL conferences and for the Sunday and Monday prime time football packages came up for renewal, the Fox Broadcasting Company – which made a failed attempt at acquiring the Monday Night Football package six years earlier – made an aggressive move to acquire the league television rights. Knowing that it would likely need to bid considerably more than the incumbent networks to acquire a piece of the package, Fox placed a then-record bid of US$1.58 billion for the four-year contract for the broadcast rights to the National Football Conference, significantly exceeding CBS' bid of $290 million for each year of the contract. The NFC was considered the more desirable conference at the time due to its presence in most of the largest U.S. markets, such as New York City, Chicago, Dallas, and Philadelphia.

As previously mentioned, the NFL accepted Fox's bid on December 18, 1993, giving that network rights to televise NFC regular season and playoff games effective with the 1994 season, as well as the exclusive U.S. television rights to Super Bowl XXXI (held in 1997) under the initial contract. This stripped CBS of National Football League telecasts following the 1993 season after 38 years, resulting in CBS not broadcasting any NFL games for the next four years. The Fox network had only debuted seven years earlier and did not have an existing sports division; however, it would establish its own sports division and began building its own coverage by hiring many former CBS personalities (such as Pat Summerall, John Madden, James Brown, Terry Bradshaw, Dick Stockton and Matt Millen), management and production personnel.

=== 1994 ===
Super Bowl XXVIII was broadcast in the United States by NBC, with play-by-play announcer Dick Enberg and color commentator Bob Trumpy. Jim Lampley hosted all the events with the help of analysts Mike Ditka and Joe Gibbs and sideline reporters O. J. Simpson (on Buffalo's sideline) and Will McDonough (on Dallas' sideline). While Lampley was busy covering the trophy presentation, Bob Costas (who also interviewed Dallas head coach Jimmy Johnson and Dallas owner/general manager Jerry Jones together prior to the game) covered for Lampley at the host and analysts' desk (and signed off the broadcast for NBC).

It was the first time a network had held consecutive Super Bowls outright. The five-year NFL contract signed in 1989 had a provision where the last Super Bowl in the contract (XXVIII) would not be rotated, but would go to the highest bidder. NBC, which had held XXVII (according to the original rotation, NBC would have had XXVI and CBS XXVII, but the NFL allowed the networks to switch the two games in order to allow CBS a significant lead-in to its coverage of the 1992 Winter Olympics), was the only network to bid on XXVIII. Less than two weeks before the game was aired, NBC had shown a Peanuts special, You're In the Super Bowl, Charlie Brown, in which the character Melody-Melody wins the Punt, Pass & Kick contest wearing a Dallas Cowboys uniform. For this game, NBC introduced a new theme for NFL broadcasts by composer John Colby that would be retained for the 1994 season.

Previously, the league alternated the Super Bowl broadcast among its television networks, except for Super Bowl I in which both NBC and CBS televised it simultaneously. CBS broadcast Super Bowl II, then the league rotated the broadcast between CBS and NBC until 1985 when ABC entered the rotation when they broadcast Super Bowl XIX.

CBS televised its last game as the rights holder of the National Football Conference package on January 23, 1994, when the Dallas Cowboys defeated the San Francisco 49ers in the NFC Championship Game, 38–21. Before signing off one last time, CBS aired a photo montage of their most memorable moments during their 38 years of covering the NFL set to the song "After the Sunrise" by Yanni.

The unexpectedly high bids from Fox and other networks increased the NFL salary cap, new in 1994, to $34 million from the predicted $32 million. CBS's Laurence Tisch had apparently underestimated the value of its NFL rights with respect to its advertising revenues and to its promotional opportunities for other programming on the network. Indeed, Fox was still an upstart player in 1993, not yet considered on par with CBS, NBC and ABC, the three longer established major networks (Fox, by comparison, had debuted in October 1986 as the only venture at a fourth television network since the 1956 demise of the DuMont Television Network to truly compete with the "Big Three"). The network already had offbeat hits such as The Simpsons, Married... with Children, and Beverly Hills, 90210 on its schedule. However, Fox did not have a sports division up to that point, and its news division was a few years away from fruition (most Fox stations outside of a few owned by the network did not even produce their own news programming), and most Fox affiliates were often either full-power UHF stations or low-powered stations.

The acquisition of NFL rights by Fox made that network a major player in American television by giving it many new viewers (and affiliates) and a platform to advertise its other programs. In the meantime, CBS lost several affiliates, and ratings for its other programming languished. On May 23, 1994, News Corporation, then parent of Fox, struck an alliance with New World Communications, by now a key ownership group with several VHF affiliates of the three established major networks – most of which were CBS affiliates, almost all of which were located in NFC markets – and wary of a CBS without football. Through the deal, in which Fox purchased a 20% interest in New World, the company signed an agreement to affiliate the majority of its stations (including those that New World was in the process of acquiring from Argyle Communications and Citicasters) with Fox; twelve of New World's stations began switching their affiliations to Fox beginning in September 1994 and continuing through September 1996.

To this day, CBS admits that it has never fully recovered from the loss of key affiliates through the New World-Fox deal. It took a particularly severe hit in Atlanta, Detroit and Milwaukee, as the network found itself on the verge of having to import the signals of nearby affiliates via cable and satellite after being turned down for affiliation deals by other major network stations in those markets. Ultimately, the network was relegated to UHF stations with marginal signals in certain areas within their markets (because of satellite television, the NFL Sunday Ticket in local markets, and rules of the time, satellite subscribers were required to use antennas to pick up local affiliates). CBS purchased one of these stations, WWJ-TV (channel 62), only days before its longtime Detroit affiliate, WJBK (channel 2), was set to switch to Fox. The ratings impact in these three markets was significant; the former CBS affiliates were all considered to be ratings contenders, especially during the NFL season. With CBS ending up on UHF stations that had virtually no significant history as a former Fox or first-tier independent station (or former Big Three affiliate for that matter), ratings for CBS programming in these markets declined significantly. In Milwaukee, for instance, WITI (channel 6)'s switch from CBS to Fox resulted in several of CBS' remaining sports properties, most notably the Daytona 500, not being available to cable subscribers for much of 1995 until Weigel Broadcasting signed carriage agreements with providers to add new CBS station WDJT-TV (channel 58).

CBS apparently underestimated the value of its rights with respect to its advertising revenues and to its promotional opportunities for other network programs. The vast resources of Fox founder Rupert Murdoch allowed that network to grow quickly, primarily to the detriment of CBS. The loss of the NFL came in part because CBS Sports suddenly went into cost-cutting mode in the wake of its money-bleeding, $1 billion deal with Major League Baseball (1990–1993). The network had already developed a stodgy and overly budgeted image under Laurence Tisch, who had become chief executive officer of CBS in 1985. Tisch was already notorious for having made deep cuts at the network's news division and for selling off major portions of the company (such as the 1988 sale of its Columbia Records division to Sony). When CBS lost the NFL to Fox, the "Tiffany Network" struggled to compete in the ratings with a slate of programming whose audiences skewed older than programs broadcast by the other networks, even though the network still finished ahead of Fox, whose programming at the time of the NFL deal was almost exclusively limited to primetime and children's programming. One of the few bright spots in terms of ratings and audience demographics for CBS in the Tisch era, the Late Show with David Letterman (which often dominated The Tonight Show with Jay Leno in its first two years) saw its ratings decline in large part due to the affiliation switches, at times even finishing third behind Nightline on ABC.

Fox aired its inaugural NFL game telecast on August 12, 1994, with a preseason game between the Denver Broncos and the San Francisco 49ers at Candlestick Park in San Francisco. Coverage formally began the following month on September 4, with the premiere of Fox NFL Sunday, followed by a slate of six regionally televised regular season games on the first Sunday of the 1994 season.

The October 17, 1994 episode of Monday Night Football between the Kansas City Chiefs and Denver Broncos featured a duel between two future Hall of Fame quarterbacks, Joe Montana and John Elway. With 1:29 left to play in the game, Elway scored on a 4-yard touchdown run to put the Broncos ahead 28–24. But then Montana led the Chiefs on a 75-yard drive to score the game-winning touchdown with just 8 seconds to play. The final score was Chiefs 31, Broncos 28.

The October 31, 1994 game between the Green Bay Packers and Chicago Bears is notable for a very windy/rainy game, which also featured the Crypt Keeper deliver the famous phase, and also remembered with a 36-yard TD run by Brett Favre, who had a sore hip that night. Later dubbed the Halloween Monsoon by Bear fans, the Packers crushed the Bears, 33–6.

=== 1995 ===
Super Bowl XXIX was broadcast in the United States by the American Broadcasting Company (ABC), with play-by-play announcer Al Michaels and color commentators Frank Gifford and Dan Dierdorf. Lynn Swann (Chargers sideline) and Lesley Visser (49ers sideline) served as sideline reporters. During that Super Bowl, Visser became the first woman assigned to a Super Bowl sideline. Visser had previously become the first woman sportscaster to cover the Vince Lombardi Trophy presentation ceremony, when she covered Super Bowl XXVI for CBS. Brent Musburger hosted all the Super Bowl XXIX pregame (2 hours), halftime, and postgame events with the help of then-ABC Sports analyst Dick Vermeil, Musburger's regular color commentator on ABC's college football telecasts, and then-New York Jets quarterback Boomer Esiason. This would be the final Super Bowl hosted by Musburger, as all subsequent Super Bowls on ABC were hosted by ESPN's Chris Berman following the Disney purchase of ABC (which included ESPN), and the subsequent integration of ESPN and ABC Sports (now ESPN on ABC). Also, the trophy presentation for this game was the last to be held in the winning team's locker room, as all subsequent Vince Lombardi Trophy presentations would be held on the field.

This was the last Super Bowl broadcast by the Monday Night Football broadcast team of Michaels, Gifford and Dierdorf. This was the broadcast team for Monday Night Football from 1987–1997. They also worked ABC's coverage of Super Bowls XXII and XXV. This would also be the last Super Bowl aired on ABC until the 1999 season (when Al Michaels called the game with Boomer Esiason).

Starting in 1995, NBC unveiled a new theme by veteran composer Randy Edelman, which was used for both its pregame show (now simply titled The NFL on NBC) and game telecasts. This theme would be used until Super Bowl XXXII in 1997 between the Denver Broncos and Green Bay Packers. NBC lost AFC television rights after 1997 to CBS which currently has them today. The NFL would not return to NBC until 2006 for Sunday Night Football. NBC still uses the 1995 to 1997 era theme, but only for online streams of Sunday Night Football online (dubbed "NBC Sunday Night Football Extra") if the feed is accessed prior to the start of the game.

In the 1995 MNF regular season opener between the Dallas Cowboys and New York Giants at the New Jersey Meadowlands, Cowboys owner Jerry Jones controversially brought Nike chairman Phil Knight down to the sidelines, representing Jones' individual deal with Nike, contrary to the NFL's policy of negotiating its marketing deals as a league.

=== 1996 ===
Super Bowl XXX was broadcast in the United States by NBC, with play-by-play announcer Dick Enberg and color commentators Phil Simms, Paul Maguire, and Jim Gray and Will McDonough on the sidelines. Greg Gumbel hosted all the events with the help of then-NBC analysts Ahmad Rashad, Mike Ditka, Joe Gibbs, and Joe Montana. The Vince Lombardi Trophy presentation started a tradition in which it is held on the field instead of inside the winners' locker room.

All three Super Bowl wins for the Cowboys in the 1990s were broadcast on NBC, who later gained majority control and then full ownership of its affiliate in the Dallas area, KXAS-TV.

By 1996, Fox's graphic changed to a full-statistics panel, where down and distance, penalty, and key in-game statistics would pop in and out when necessary. The basic design of the scoring bug, which was named the "FoxBox", mimicked the version used on Fox's MLB coverage. For Fox's coverage of Super Bowl XXXIII at the end of the 1998 season, the starting lineups were shown using a virtual television. To television viewers, the effect appeared as if the end zone opened up and a giant television screen rose from the ground. The virtual television display showed video announcing the starting lineups. The virtual television effect was provided by PVI Virtual Media Services using its L-VIS virtual graphics system.

=== 1997 ===
Super Bowl XXXI was the first Super Bowl to be televised in the United States by the Fox network. Play-by-play announcer Pat Summerall and color commentator John Madden, both previously of CBS, called the game. James Brown hosted all the events with help from his fellow Fox NFL Sunday cast members Terry Bradshaw, Howie Long, and Ronnie Lott.

This was the first of three Super Bowls to be called by Summerall and Madden while with Fox (Super Bowls XXXIII and XXXVI being the others).

The telecast ended up being the highest-rated program in the history of the then ten-year-old Fox network, and it currently ties Super Bowl XLII for the highest-rated program in the entire history of the network. Afterwards, Fox televised The X-Files episode "Leonard Betts". Fox's broadcast was also the first Super Bowl to have a constant, live-updating graphic for the score, time and down & distance. The FoxBox was used also in Super Bowl XXXIII, and the graphic positioned over live action has become the norm in virtually all sports broadcasts at the national and regional production levels.

With the Packers' win, they became the third team to win Super Bowls on three networks (I-broadcast on both CBS and NBC, II-CBS, and Fox). They also became the first team to win three Super Bowls with Fox as one of the networks to televise their win. The previous seven games played in domes were all won by the designated road team, which wore white. The game was rematched on October 27, 1997, as a near-national telecast on ABC's Monday Night Football, the only time ABC aired a rematch of the previous season's Super Bowl.

In 1997, ABC began using a scoring bug showing the game clock and score throughout the entire broadcast.

TNT lost their rights to the NFL following the 1997 season after ESPN chose to bid on the entire regular season package beginning in 1998. In the wake of the loss of NFL rights, TNT began negotiations with NBC Sports to start a new football league; TNT eventually backed out of the proposal. (NBC's proposed league eventually became the XFL.) TNT would not air professional football again until signing on as a broadcast partner with the Alliance of American Football in 2019.

The last TNT game was aired on October 26, 1997. Fittingly, one of the teams involved was the Atlanta Falcons, based in the home city of Turner Broadcasting - Atlanta, Georgia (they played at their division rivals, the Carolina Panthers, located up Interstate 85 in Charlotte, North Carolina). Unlike the Braves, Hawks and Thrashers, however, Turner never owned the Falcons at any point in time (due to NFL ownership rules).

=== 1998 ===
Super Bowl XXXII was televised in the United States by NBC, with play-by-play announcer Dick Enberg (calling his eighth and final Super Bowl), color commentators Phil Simms and Paul Maguire, and sideline reporter Jim Gray. Greg Gumbel hosted all the events, and was joined by co-host Ahmad Rashad and commentators Cris Collinsworth, Sam Wyche, and Joe Gibbs. Following the game, NBC aired a special one-hour episode of 3rd Rock from the Sun, which opened live at the game site with Gumbel playing himself before he was "attacked" by show star John Lithgow. During the game, NBC (partnering with Silicon Graphics Inc.) would include real-time 3D computer graphics on SGI's Onyx2 computers to display a model of Qualcomm Stadium and simulating real-time animation of things such as receiver patterns and yards after the catch; along with a second model known as "Football Guy" which allowed viewers to see defensive players from the quarterback's vantage point, with those replays handled by Randy Cross.

NBC's rebound in overall ratings in both the 1980s and 1990s (after years of being in the bottom of the ratings cellar) was attributed in part to its continuing coverage of the NFL. But with television contract re-negotiations in early 1998 ushering in the era of multibillion-dollar broadcasting agreements, an era of pro football broadcasting would soon come to an unceremonious conclusion.

Neal Pilson, former president of CBS Sports, said that "Four years later the negative impact was so severe that CBS went to the NFL and said, 'Name your price and we'll pay whatever to get a package' ... We lost affiliates, ratings, the male audience and a lot of sports sponsorships". In November 1996, Sean McManus (son of ABC Sports broadcast legend Jim McKay and protégé of longtime ABC Sports executive Roone Arledge) was named President of CBS Sports, and would lead CBS' efforts in re-acquiring broadcast rights to the NFL. On January 12, 1998, CBS agreed to a contract with the NFL to broadcast American Football Conference games effective with the 1998 season (taking over the rights from NBC), paying $4 billion over eight years ($500 million per season). In the last year NBC had rights to the AFC, the Denver Broncos, an original AFL team, defeated the Green Bay Packers in Super Bowl XXXII, which aired on NBC and ended a 13-year drought against the NFC in the Super Bowl. Around the time CBS took over the rights to the AFC saw the trend of the 1980s and 1990s reverse, in that the AFC became the dominant conference over the NFC (1998 also saw the Broncos win the Super Bowl). The New England Patriots dynasty in the 2000s in the only AFC-only top-ten market also contributed to the ratings surge. In fact, the primary stations for both the Broncos and Patriots are the same – KCNC-TV in Denver, and WBZ-TV in Boston, prior to the two stations switching to CBS in 1995 through the network's affiliation deal with Westinghouse – as when NBC carried the AFC (KUSA and WHDH-TV carried those teams' games from 1995 to 1998).

As previously mentioned, NBC's consecutive 33-year run as a football broadcaster came to an end with Super Bowl XXXII, played on January 25, 1998, between the Denver Broncos and Green Bay Packers. The Broncos won 31–24 to snap the AFC's 13-year losing streak in the Super Bowl (since then, the AFC has won eleven additional Super Bowls to the NFC's seven). Following the game, NBC aired a special one-hour episode of 3rd Rock from the Sun, which opened live at the game site with Greg Gumbel playing himself before he was "attacked" by show star John Lithgow as his Dick Solomon character, warning about the invasion of alien females that was part of the episode's plotline.

NBC, meanwhile, had indicated a desire to bid for Monday Night Football rights in 1998, but eventually gave up, allowing ABC to retain the rights.

In addition, the current AFC deal also saw CBS indirectly acquire rights to air most games played by the Pittsburgh Steelers, which air locally on KDKA-TV (a longtime CBS affiliate, which became a CBS O&O after parent company Westinghouse Electric Corporation bought CBS in late 1995 and has long been one of CBS's strongest stations) and often get the highest television ratings for an NFL franchise due to the team's rabid fanbase on a national level. Coincidentally, before the AFL–NFL merger (when the Steelers went to the AFC voluntarily to balance out the number of teams between conferences), Steelers road games had aired on KDKA-TV as part of the network's deal to air NFL games, while league rules at the time mandated that home games could not be televised at all during this period, even if they did sell out tickets.

After acquiring the new package, CBS Sports then named former NFL Today host Greg Gumbel, as their lead play-by-play announcer (Gumbel had moved to NBC Sports, where he worked from 1994 to 1998 after CBS lost the NFL to Fox). Phil Simms (who at the time, was at NBC as part of the lead announcing team alongside Dick Enberg and Paul Maguire) was hired as the lead color commentator. On September 6, 1998, after 1,687 days since the last broadcast of The NFL Today, host Jim Nantz welcomed back viewers to CBS for its coverage of the National Football League.

Given the challenge of making its coverage of the American Football Conference different from that of NBC, CBS passed over longtime NBC veterans Charlie Jones and Bob Trumpy in favor of newcomers such as Ian Eagle and Steve Tasker. According to CBS Sports executive producer Terry Ewert, "We wanted to forge our own way and go in a different direction. We wanted to make decisions on a new way of looking at things." In one stark difference from NBC, CBS used a score and clock graphic for its NFL games that was constant during the game broadcasts outside of break tosses, a la the FoxBox. CBS' contribution was dubbed the EyeBox.

"When CBS got the NFL back (in 1997), everything picked up again", Pilson said. On November 8, 1998, CBS televised the first NFL game to be broadcast in high-definition, between the New York Jets and Buffalo Bills at Giants Stadium. It was also the first time two Heisman Trophy winning quarterbacks started against each other in the NFL (Vinny Testaverde for the Jets and Doug Flutie for the Bills).

In 1998, as Disney began consolidating ESPN and ABC Sports, ESPN's NFL coverage began using themes associated with Monday Night Football such as "Heavy Action". In-game use of these themes ended after 2000, in favor of another original theme also referred to as "Sirens" (for featuring sirens prominently) by The Herbaliser.

Also 1998, Lesley Visser became the first female commentator on Monday Night Football. She had been the first female beat writer in the NFL when she covered the New England Patriots for the Boston Globe in the mid-1970s, and was the first and only woman to handle a Super Bowl Trophy presentation when she was a sportscaster with CBS. Visser was followed by several women, notably Melissa Stark and Lisa Guerrero, on the sideline who were perceived as "eye candy", none of whom affected the ratings.

For the 1998 season, ABC pushed Monday Night Football back an hour (it has usually aired at 9:00 p.m. Eastern Time). A special pre-game show was created, Monday Night Blast, hosted by Chris Berman from the ESPN Zone restaurant in Baltimore. The game would start around 8:20 p.m. Eastern for this particular season. Despite leaving the booth, Frank Gifford stayed on one more year as a special contributor to the pre-game show, usually presenting a single segment.

Also beginning in 1998, ESPN broadcast the entire slate of Sunday night games (now officially rebranded as ESPN Sunday Night Football), and had exclusive rights to any night game other than the season opener and regular Monday night games, which aired on ABC. Thus, ESPN would usually have a few weekends each season with games on both Saturday (sometimes Thursday instead) and Sunday nights. Also in 1998, Paul Maguire joined Mike Patrick and Joe Theismann in the booth after re-joining ESPN after several years as a color commentator for NBC.

Also beginning in that season, the networks are now required to include a teaser bumper prior to kickoff and at the end of the game acknowledging the league and the network accompanied by a standardized NFL fanfare. In addition, the practice of having the commentators announcing the copyright disclaimer was abandoned in favor of a standardized copyright disclaimer read by Earl Mann.

A mildly infamous incident came during the final 1998 telecast when Dierdorf asked Michaels, prior to a halftime interview with Buffalo Bills quarterback Doug Flutie, "Are you gonna tell 'em how you're sick of all this B.C. [Boston College] stuff?" Michaels (thinking that they had gone into a commercial break and that his microphone was off) replied, "No shit."

Nielsen ratings data for the first 17 weeks of the 1998–99 television season showed that Monday Night Football averaged a 13.9 rating, down 8% from the 15.0 average rating for the broadcasts in 1997 – the previous standard in ratings futility. In actuality, MNF ratings had been hitting all-time record lows for the previous four years.

=== 1999 ===
Super Bowl XXXIII was broadcast in the United States by Fox and featured the broadcast team of play-by-play announcer Pat Summerall and color commentator John Madden. James Brown hosted all the events with help from his then-fellow Fox NFL Sunday cast members Terry Bradshaw, Howie Long and Cris Collinsworth.

Miami became the first Super Bowl host city to have games televised by all four major American broadcast networks. CBS televised Super Bowls II and X (and later XLI and XLIV), NBC televised Super Bowls III, V, XIII, and XXIII, and ABC televised Super Bowl XXIX.

With this appearance, the Broncos became the first team to play in Super Bowls televised on all four major broadcast networks in the United States. CBS televised the Broncos' losses in Super Bowls XII, XXI, and XXIV (and later their Super Bowl 50 victory), ABC their loss in Super Bowl XXII, and NBC their win in Super Bowl XXXII. The Pittsburgh Steelers became the second with their appearance in Super Bowl XLV, and the New York Giants the third with their appearance in Super Bowl XLVI.

The starting lineups were shown using a virtual TV. To TV viewers, it appeared as if the end zone opened up and a giant TV came up out of the ground. The virtual TV displayed video announcing the starting lineups. The virtual TV effect was provided by PVI Virtual Media Services using their L-VIS virtual graphics system.

Beginning in 1999, Suzy Kolber, who had recently rejoined ESPN from Fox Sports, served as the sideline reporter; Kolber replaced Solomon Wilcots, who joined CBS as a color commentator.

Boomer Esiason replaced Frank Gifford on Monday Night Football in 1998, and Dan Dierdorf left for a return to CBS in 1999. Esiason's relationship with Al Michaels was questioned leading to his firing. Esiason and Michaels reportedly never got along, and it led to ABC firing Esiason shortly after calling Super Bowl XXXIV together.

Also beginning in 1999, Monday Night Football telecasts used a computer-generated yellow line to mark where a team needs to get a first down, a method first used by ABC sister cable channel ESPN. 1999 also saw the Pro Football Hall of Fame Game being moved from Saturday afternoon to Monday night. It would remain on Monday night through 2005.

== See also ==
- NFL on television
- History of the NFL on television
- List of NFL Championship Game broadcasters
- List of Super Bowl broadcasters
- History of Monday Night Football
