= Kay Koplovitz =

American businesswoman (born 1945)

- Born: Kay Smith; April 11, 1945 (age 81); Milwaukee, Wisconsin, US
- Education: University of Wisconsin–Madison and Michigan State University
- Occupations: Co-Founder and Chairman of Springboard Enterprises and Springboard Growth Capital
- Website: koplovitz.com

Kay Koplovitz (née Smith, born April 11, 1945) is an American businesswoman, best known as the founder of the cable television channel USA Network, for which she served as chairwoman and CEO from its founding in 1977 until 1998 when it was sold for $4.5 billion. She was the first woman in the US to head a television network. She is also the author of the books Bold Women, Big Ideas: Learning to Play the High-Risk Entrepreneurial Game, and Been There, Run That. She is credited with creating the joint advertising-licensing model, which became widespread among cable television networks.

== Early life and education ==
Kay Koplovitz was born on April 11, 1945, as Kay Smith in a middle-class neighborhood of Milwaukee, Wisconsin. Her mom worked at home, and her father was a sales executive for a metal forging company. As a young child, Koplovitz would always be looking for ways to make money, having an early affinity for salesmanship, her entrepreneurial spirit was being crafted, from selling Christmas cards to Girl Scout cookies, Koplovitz loved making ideas work, making money, and being able to buy things she wanted. Koplovitz graduated from the University of Wisconsin–Madison with a B.A. in communications and earned a master's degree in communications from Michigan State University. Between her junior and senior year Koplovitz visited England, and while on her travels saw a poster advertising a lecture on geosynchronous orbiting satellites. The then twenty year old Koplovitz was fascinated by the lecture, and later she wrote her masters thesis on satellite communications and the potential impact on governments, people, and communications.

== Career ==
=== USA Networks ===
In 1975, Koplovitz joined Home Box Office and led the promotion of cable and satellite broadcasting of the Thrilla in Manila boxing match between Muhammad Ali and Joe Frazier. September 30, 1975, would change history forever. The timing of the sporting event would be the turning point Koplovitz would need in order to launch her idea. The live broadcast of the famous boxing match, allowed congressmen and senators to see that satellites could be used for good commercial purposes and give people much joy from experiencing the live broadcasts. She subsequently founded the USA Network in 1977 as an all-sports service, known as the Madison Square Garden Sports Network (not to be confused with the New York City-area regional sports network of the same name now simply known as MSG); She led the launch of the USA Network mainly as an all-sports service in order to compete with Home Box Office. The channel was renamed the USA Network in 1980. USA later become the number one ranking cable network in primetime viewership for 13 consecutive years.

The USA Network was the first cable network to rely greatly on advertising revenue. Despite creating and supervising the network, Koplovitz did not own it, but remained its CEO during ownership changes. Under Koplovitz's leadership, the USA Network was the number one ranking cable network in primetime broadcasting, and later included the Sci Fi Channel in 1992 and the launch of USA Network International in 1994. Koplovitz is also credited with creating the business model for cable networks after introducing the concept of two revenue streams: licensing and advertising. She served as chairman and chief executive officer of USA Networks until 9 April 1998, months after the company was sold for $4.5 billion and became a publicly listed company.

=== Clinton administration and Springboard Enterprises ===
In the 1990s, Koplovitz became acquainted with the Clinton Administration. In early 1994, Koplovitz was among the TV executives who would assist President Bill Clinton in pushing a public service announcement campaign against violence in society, and was also later among media executives who personally met with President Clinton in 1996 to discuss TV's violence rating system. In 1998, President Clinton appointed Koplovitz to chair the bipartisan National Women's Business Council. This helped create a platform for her to co-found Springboard Enterprises in 2000. Springboard is a non-profit organization fostering venture capital investments in women-led high growth companies and has created about $36 billion in revenue, created over 10,000 jobs, and has accelerated the growth of 850+ women led businesses since its inception.

=== Koplovitz & Company, New York Fashion Tech Lab, and Springboard Growth Capital ===
In 1998, Koplovitz & Company LLC was established to provide advisory services to entertainment companies, sports organizations, advertisers and distributors. It advises companies on growth strategies and the firm makes investments in early and mid-stage companies in media and technology. She also serves as head of the New York Fashion Tech Lab, which she co-founded in 2014 in hopes of bringing promising technology companies in collaboration with the fashion and retail industry. In 2016, she co-founded Springboard Growth Capital to bring growth stage investments to technology and life sciences companies emerging from Springboard Enterprises.

=== Board memberships ===
In addition to her role as Chairman of both Springboard Enterprises and Springboard Growth Capital, Koplovitz also currently serves on the board at Athena Technology Acquisition Corp-SPAC and Athena Consumer Acquisition Corp, both part of Athena SPACs, Accenture Ventures and at Veniam. She is also affiliated with Athena Capital, where she is a part of its advisory network of senior women leaders.

She previously served as chairman of the board of Kate Spade (formerly Liz Claiborne), from January 2007 until May 2013. She also previously served as a board member of ION Media, CA Technologies, Time Inc., Instinet, Oracle, Nabisco and Gen Re, Sun New Media and a trustee emeritus of The Paley Center for Media and The International Hall of Fame. In April 2014, Koplovitz joined the 10-member board of Time Inc., at the time the publishing arm of Time Warner (later known as WarnerMedia). She remained on the board until Time Inc. was acquired by the Meredith Corporation in 2018.

== Awards and honors ==
Koplovitz holds honorary doctorate degrees from Emerson College, St. John's University, Michigan State University and Canisius College. Other honors and awards she has received include:

- The National Cable Television Association Vanguard Award for Young Leadership (1979)
- Koplovitz was selected for the inaugural 2021 Forbes 50 Over 50; made up of entrepreneurs, leaders, scientists and creators who are over the age of 50.

== Personal life ==
Koplovitz is married to private investor William C. Koplovitz Jr.
