= Al Trautwig =

American sports commentator (1956–2025)

- Trautwig covering a Knicks game at Madison Square Garden
- Born: Alan Trautwig; February 26, 1956; Oceanside, New York, U.S.
- Died: February 23, 2025 (aged 68); Glen Cove, New York, U.S.
- Education: Adelphi University
- Occupation: Sports broadcaster
- Years active: 1978–2019
- Spouse: Cathleen Trautwig
- Children: 1

Alan Trautwig (February 26, 1956 – February 23, 2025) was an American sports commentator who worked with MSG Network, ABC, NBC, NBC Sports Network, and USA Network. He later did pre-game and post-game shows for the New York Knicks and New York Rangers, as well as fill-in play-by-play for both teams.

== Early life ==
Trautwig was born on February 26, 1956, in Oceanside, New York, and grew up in nearby Garden City South. He was a stick boy for the New York Islanders of the NHL and a ball boy for the New York Nets of the ABA when they both played at the Nassau Coliseum. He graduated from H. Frank Carey Junior-Senior High School, in Franklin Square. He was a 1978 graduate of Adelphi University, where he majored in business. He was also a 1991 Inductee into the university's Athletics Hall of Fame. His first broadcasting experience was calling New York Apollo soccer matches on WBAU during the summer of 1978 and subsequently WMCA.

== Broadcasting career ==
In the 1980s, Trautwig hosted USA Network's coverage of the National Hockey League; one off-beat feature that he did was to interview a water fountain. He also occasionally would do the sponsor plugs for WWF shows that would air on the USA Network in the mid-'80s. He occasionally guest hosted the NHL on Versus studio program Hockey Central. He also anchored several MISL games from 1978 to 1992. In summer of 1988, Trautwig hosted SportsNite for ABC Sports, leading former network personality Howard Cosell to quip to The Washington Post's Norman Chad, "I don't even know, as God is my witness, or have ever even heard of an Al Trautwig."

Trautwig was one of the original hosts for Classic Sports Network when it was founded in 1996.

The 2000 New York Sportscaster of the Year, Trautwig covered eight Olympic games, and won New York Sports Emmys for his coverage of the Yankees, Knicks, and Rangers. From 1991 to 2001, Trautwig was host of the New York Yankees' pre- and post-game shows on MSG Network, and also was in the booth for a few innings per game. In 2006, he hosted the new MSG show called Al Trautwig's MSG Vault, which featured vintage and sometimes discovered lost footage of the Knicks and Rangers from the 1960s, 1970s, and 1980s.

At the beginning of the 2006 football season Trautwig became a radio host as well, hosting the radio version of NBC's Football Night in America for Westwood One, which co-produces the show (called NBC NFL Sunday) with the network. However, Trautwig left the show in the middle of the season. After a 2019 broadcast in which viewers noted that Trautwig appeared unwell, he took a leave of absence and did not appear on television after that year; his MSG contract expired in 2021 and was not renewed. In 2024, Trautwig said he was working on a book about his career.

He also hosted NBC's coverage of the Ford Ironman World Championship, Foster Grant Ironman World Championship 70.3 and ING New York City Marathon.

=== Auto racing, cycling and tennis commentary ===
Trautwig was a television pit reporter alongside Jim McKay for ABC Sports' coverage of the 1986-1987 Indianapolis 500, and provided play-by-play commentary for the 1987 CART Indy car broadcasts of the Grand Prix of Cleveland and the Michigan 500, shortly before Paul Page joined the ABC Sports team.

He co-anchored coverage of the Tour de France (from 2004 to 2007 on Versus (formerly OLN) and in the 1980s for ABC), the Olympics, and NBC's coverage of the Arena Football League. Despite his years of experience as a broadcaster, he was sometimes criticized by cycling fans, for his occasionally uninformed commentary, and his tendency to compare the Tour to various mainstream sports he covered.

From 2005 to 2008, he also co-anchored USA Network's coverage of the US Open tennis tournament. Trautwig also had a cameo in the movie Cool Runnings as an announcer for the bobsled competition. He co-anchored the US Open's live feed during the tournament.

=== Gymnastics commentary ===
In 2000, Trautwig replaced John Tesh as play-by-play announcer of American national and international gymnastics competitions for NBC, including the 2000, 2004, 2008, 2012, and 2016 Olympic games. Trautwig's color commentators included former Olympic gold medalist Tim Daggett, former Canadian champion gymnast Elfi Schlegel, three-time Olympian John Roethlisberger and 2008 Olympic champion Nastia Liukin.

Trautwig stated that, at the urging of NBC producers, his gymnastics commentary focused on the personal stories of the gymnasts. During the 2008 Beijing Olympics, he described a gymnast's pre-Olympics injury as "like having a tear in your wedding dress right before you walk down the aisle."

His most notable controversy involved repeatedly referring to the fact that Simone Biles's adoptive parents are her biological grandparents during the 2016 Rio Olympics, refusing to refer to them as her parents. He publicly doubled down on these sentiments on Twitter despite widespread backlash, tweeting, "they may be mom and dad, but they are not her parents." His commentary has resulted in some in the gymnastics community criticizing Trautwig long before the Biles controversy at the 2016 Rio Olympics. Shortly after the conclusion of the 2016 Rio Olympics, Trautwig was permanently removed from gymnastics commentary duty.

== Personal life and death ==
Trautwig and his wife, Cathleen, had a son. After the end of his broadcasting career, he taught for a time at Adelphi. He was a resident of Glen Cove, New York.

Trautwig died at home from cancer on February 23, 2025, at the age of 68.
