= Al Albert (sportscaster) =

American television sports announcer

- Born: Alan Aufrichtig; Brooklyn, New York, U.S.
- Education: Ohio University
- Relatives: Marv Albert (brother); Steve Albert (brother); Kenny Albert (nephew)
- Sports commentary career
- Genre: Play-by-play
- Sports: Basketball; ice hockey; boxing

Alan Albert (born Alan Aufrichtig in Brooklyn, New York) is an American sportscaster, who formerly called basketball games for the New York Nets and Denver Nuggets, as well as national NBA and NHL coverage for the USA Network. He was also a play-by-play sportscaster for the Indiana Pacers. He has also worked in boxing, as the blow-by-blow announcer for Tuesday Night Fights.

== Education ==
Albert obtained his degree from Ohio University, where he played hockey and lacrosse. He played goalie for both sports. Albert was invited to training camp by the New York Rangers and ended up playing a single season for the Toledo Blades.

== Career ==
Albert started his broadcasting career in Denver, working for a local broadcasting company called KOA and also KHOW radio and KWGN-TV. He also served as a sports anchor on WNBC in New York City and was the voice of the New York Nets and New York Islanders. He was the voice for the Nuggets for 21 years until he decided to leave Denver in 1996. In 1999, he joined the Indiana Pacers as a play-by-play man. He worked there until 2007.

On January 24, 1984, Albert, working for USA network, called what Syracuse fans call the greatest game in the Carrier Dome ever. Syracuse faced Boston College, and the teams were tied 73–73 after a missed free throw by Boston College's Martin Clark. Sean Kerins passed the rebound to Pearl Washington who took three steps and made a half court shot to win the game. Albert's call lives on as The Greatest Play-by-Play Call in the Carrier Dome ever: "Washington, two seconds, OHHHH! 'The Pearl' hits it ..at midcourt." Syracuse University basketball fans call that the greatest nine words in Syracuse history.

== Awards and honors ==
In 1995, he won the Sam Taub Award for excellence in boxing broadcasting journalism.

== Family ==
Albert hails from a family of broadcasters. His brothers, Marv and Steve Albert, and a nephew, Kenny, are also play-by-play sports commentators.

| Preceded by Dan Kelly | Stanley Cup Final American network television play-by-play announcer 1985 (Albert called Games 3-5) | Succeeded by Sam Rosen and Ken Wilson |
