= UA-Columbia Cablevision =

US cable television provider

- Industry: Cable television
- Founder: Robert Rosencrans
- Defunct: 1991
- Successor: Tele-Communications, Inc.
- Headquarters: Denver, Colorado, U.S.

UA-Columbia Cablevision was a cable television provider in the United States. Originally partially owned by United Artists Entertainment (UA), UA would later gain full control. It was one of the largest providers in the early years of cable TV service. It is noted for being part of a joint-venture in the 1970s that would lead to the formation of one of the first cable networks, the USA Network. It was the first cable system for the San Antonio, Texas area. In 1983 the San Antonio division of UA-Columbia was spun off to Canadian-based Rogers Cablesystems which sold spun off its United States cable systems to Paragon Cable out in Minnesota in 1989.

Robert Rosencrans founded Columbia Cable Systems in 1961 and grew it into a multi-state system eventually growing to over 500,000 customers by the time he sold it to UA Theaters and Rogers Cable in 1984.

In 1991, Tele-Communications, Inc. (the largest cable provider in the US at the time) merged with UA Entertainment making UA-Columbia Cablevision a wholly owned subsidiary of TCI. It later became United Artists Cable before TCI dropped the UA name from their cable systems altogether.
