= USA Network =

American pay television channel

- Logo used since 2005
- Country: United States
- Broadcast area: United States
- Headquarters: 229 West 43rd Street, New York City

Programming
- Languages: English; Spanish
- Picture format: 1080i HDTV; 4K (upscaled from 1080i, special occasions) (downscaled to letterboxed 480i for the SDTV feed)

Ownership
- Parent: UA-Columbia Cablevision (1977–1981); Madison Square Garden Corp. (1977–81); Time Inc. (1981–87); Paramount Pictures (1981–97); MCA Inc. (1981–96); Seagram (1996–97); USA Networks Inc. (1997–2002); Vivendi Universal (2002–04); NBCUniversal (2004–26); Versant (2026–present)
- Sister channels: Golf Channel; CNBC; E!; MS NOW; Oxygen; Syfy

History
- Launched: September 22, 1977; 49 years ago (as MSG); April 9, 1980; 46 years ago (re-launch as USA Network)
- Founder: Kay Koplovitz
- Former names: Madison Square Garden Sports Network (1977–1980)

Links
- Website: usanetwork.com

Availability

Streaming media
- Affiliated streaming service: Fandango
- Livestream services: DirecTV Stream, FuboTV, Hulu + Live TV, Sling TV, YouTube TV

USA Network (stylized in all lowercase as usa) is an American basic cable television channel owned by Versant. It was launched on September 22, 1977, as Madison Square Garden Sports Network, one of the first national sports cable television channels.

It was relaunched under its current name on April 9, 1980, and in the years since then, USA steadily gained popularity through its original programming, a long-established partnership with WWF/WWE and, for many years, limited sports programming. For more than 20 years, from 2004 to 2026, the network was owned by Comcast as part of NBCUniversal. USA increased its sports coverage significantly in 2022, after the initial shutdown of NBCSN, and served as the main cable component of NBC Sports until NBCSN was relaunched in 2025.

As of November 2023, USA Network is available to approximately 70 million pay television households in the United States, down from its 2011 peak of 100 million households.

== History ==
=== Madison Square Garden Sports Network (1977–1980) ===
USA Network was launched on September 22, 1977, as the Madison Square Garden Sports Network (not to be confused with the New York City-area regional sports network now known as the MSG Network). The network was founded by cable provider UA-Columbia Cablevision and the Madison Square Garden Corp. For its first two decades, the network was run by chairwoman and CEO Kay Koplovitz. The channel was one of the first national cable television channels, utilizing satellite delivery as opposed to the then-industry standard microwave relay to distribute its programming to cable systems. Unlike other cable networks at the time, it also was the first to rely greatly on advertising revenue. At launch the network mostly broadcast sporting events from Madison Square Garden to a national audience (sharing programming with the aforementioned MSG Network). The network quickly added a mix of college and less well-known professional sports held at other venues, similar to those found during the early years of ESPN. In 1978, children's programming was also added to the lineup.

=== MCA/Paramount ownership (1981–1994) and Time ownership (1981–1987) ===
On April 9, 1980, the channel changed its name to USA Network. It also added a children's program called Calliope to its schedule and some talk shows in an effort to appeal to women. USA Network also carried programming from Black Entertainment Television (BET), which launched in January 1980 with a two-hour Friday-night schedule. The channel also carried C-SPAN during daytime hours.

In 1981, ownership of the network changed. First, Time Inc. agreed to buy UA-Columbia's share of the network contingent upon Madison Square Garden owner Gulf + Western transferring its share of the network to its Paramount Pictures division. Shortly thereafter MCA Inc. also bought into the network with the three companies each owning an equal share. The joint-venture agreement contained a non-compete clause restricting the partners from operating competing advertiser-supported basic cable networks. A 1997 ruling by the Delaware Court of Chancery noted that Time Inc. had become dissatisfied with these contractual restrictions. On June 19, 1987, MCA and Paramount acquired Time's one-third interest in USA Network, becoming equal owners of the channel.

USA Network began broadcasting around the clock in October 1981. In February 1982, C-SPAN expanded its programming to 16 hours daily using a separate satellite transponder, with its shared arrangement with USA scheduled to end on April 1. In April, USA introduced USA Daytime, a 10-hour weekday programming block that included the British soap opera Coronation Street. The network also revamped its health-oriented program Alive and Well.

In 1982, USA introduced USA Cartoon Express, a children's programming block that initially consisted largely of reruns of Hanna-Barbera cartoons. The block aired during the early evening hours. The network also carried Night Flight, a late-night program that had premiered in June 1981. Airing on Friday and Saturday nights, it featured music videos, documentaries, animation, short films and cult films.

In August 1983, Barry Diller, then head of Gulf and Western's leisure-time group, confirmed that Paramount was negotiating to acquire Time Inc.'s interest in USA Network. He also identified Madison Square Garden as a potential source of programming for the channel, provided it retained the broadcasting rights to its sporting events. Diller recalled having intervened two years earlier to prevent Madison Square Garden from selling its interest in USA Network, helping establish the three-way ownership arrangement. Paramount and Madison Square Garden were both part of Gulf and Western's Entertainment and Communications Group.

During the mid-1980s, USA Network expanded its entertainment programming beyond its original emphasis on sports, acquiring television series and introducing original productions. Sports remained part of the schedule, including coverage of the US Open tennis tournament, which began in August 1984. The network also continued carrying World Wrestling Federation programming, including WWF Prime Time Wrestling, which debuted in 1985.

For the 1985–1986 season, USA Network carried four hours of original and exclusive programming, including the sitcom Check It Out!. The network expanded its programming for the 1986–1987 season, increasing its programming budget by $30 million. The new schedule included Alfred Hitchcock Presents, Chain Reaction, Love Me, Love Me Not, and a second season of Check It Out!. The expanded schedule comprised 13½ hours of original programming and 13 hours of exclusive off-network programming per week.

USA also acquired episodes of the CBS series Airwolf and commissioned 24 new episodes without original stars Jan-Michael Vincent and Ernest Borgnine. The new episodes were produced in Canada by Atlantis Films and aired on USA Network in 1987.

USA Network developed an afternoon game-show block during the mid-1980s, combining reruns with original productions. By March 1985, the network was airing reruns of The Gong Show and Make Me Laugh. In September 1985, USA introduced a revival of Jackpot. The network added revivals of Chain Reaction and Love Me, Love Me Not for the 1986–1987 season.

In June 1987, USA introduced another original game show, Bumper Stumpers, hosted by Al DuBois. The network also carried reruns of game shows including Tic-Tac-Dough and Let's Make a Deal. By September 1988, USA's weekday game-show block began at noon. That month, the network added reruns of High Rollers, hosted by Wink Martindale, to the lineup. USA Network also carried late-night reruns of two Procter & Gamble soap operas. The Edge of Night aired from August 5, 1985, to January 1989. By February 1987, Search for Tomorrow was also airing at midnight on the network. In 1989, USA debuted USA Up All Night, a showcase of low-budget feature films that aired as part of its weekend overnight schedule. The show became a cult favorite for the comedy segments that ran before commercial breaks, hosted by comedian Gilbert Gottfried on Saturdays and actress Rhonda Shear on Fridays; Shear had replaced the original Friday host, Caroline Schlitt, in January 1991. After a change in management at USA in 1998, Gottfried and Shear were let go, and the show, now without hosts, was gradually phased out.

In 1988, USA Network expanded its production of original made-for-television films through companies affiliated with its two co-owners, including Paramount Television-owned Wilshire Court Productions and MCA Television Entertainment. The network produced 24 original films in 1989 and 30 in 1990.

In October 1988, USA Network announced plans to introduce short news segments called USA Updates in January 1989. Produced by Group W Television, the one-minute segments were intended to provide news, financial and sports headlines. The channel already carried two-minute news inserts titled The Wall Street Journal Late News and The Wall Street Journal Weekend Memo. Steve Bell, then an anchor at KYW-TV in Philadelphia, joined USA Updates as its weekday anchor in late 1988. By July 1992, the segments were being co-produced by KYW-TV and Group W.

USA Network also carried First Business, a weekday financial news program scheduled to begin on the channel on April 6, 1992, at 6:30 a.m. Eastern. By 1997, CONUS Communications, which was associated with the All News Channel, was producing USA Updates for the network.

USA was the first basic cable channel to pre-empt the syndicated television market by purchasing a package of 26 films from Disney's Touchstone Pictures library in October 1989. To obtain the package, it spent an estimated $50 million to $60 million, with films including such box office hits as Dead Poets Society, Good Morning, Vietnam, and Three Men and a Baby.

The network continued airing game-show reruns during the early 1990s, including versions of Pyramid, The Joker's Wild, Tic-Tac-Dough, Scrabble, Sale of the Century, Talk About and Caesars Challenge. In June 1994, two original game shows were introduced, Free 4 All and Quicksilver.

On September 24, 1992, USA launched a sister network, the Sci-Fi Channel (now Syfy), focusing on science fiction series and films.

On January 11, 1993, USA Network premiered WWF Monday Night Raw, which was broadcast live from the Manhattan Center in New York City. The program differed from the WWF's previous taped television shows by incorporating live broadcasts before a studio audience. In 1993, USA Network launched an advertising campaign using the slogan "Escape With Us", intended to promote the channel's programming and increase its visibility.

=== USA Networks ownership (1994–2002) ===
In 1994, Viacom acquired Paramount Communications, one of USA Network's two co-owners. The following year, Seagram acquired a controlling interest in MCA Inc., which held the other half of the network. Viacom's ownership of other cable channels, including MTV, Nickelodeon and VH1, led to a dispute over the non-compete provisions of the USA Network joint-venture agreement. The dispute intensified after Viacom announced TV Land, which launched in April 1996. MCA filed suit against Viacom that month, alleging breach of contract.

On May 15, 1997, the Delaware Court of Chancery ruled that the joint-venture agreements had been breached and directed the parties to propose plans for dissolving their partnership. In September 1997, Seagram agreed to buy Viacom's 50% interest in USA Network and the Sci-Fi Channel for $1.7 billion, giving Seagram control of both channels.

In October 1997, Seagram's Universal Studios announced an agreement to combine the cable channels and its domestic television production and distribution operations with HSN, Inc., headed by Barry Diller. The resulting company would also include the Home Shopping Network and the broadcasting properties formerly known as Silver King Broadcasting. The transaction was completed on February 12, 1998, when HSN, Inc. was renamed USA Networks, Inc. and its broadcasting division became USA Broadcasting. In exchange for its contributed assets, Universal received cash and an approximately 45% ownership interest in the reorganized parent company, rather than a direct 45% stake in USA Network.

Beginning July 1, 1995, USA Network carried a morning simulcast of Bloomberg Information Television from 5:30 to 7:00 a.m. Eastern, Monday through Saturday. Bloomberg Business News purchased the airtime from USA for the financial news service, which included business headlines, market information, weather and sports updates.

Later in 1995, USA discontinued its longstanding afternoon game-show block and introduced USA Live, a three-hour program combining reruns of Love Connection and The People's Court with live hosted segments between the shows.

On June 17, 1996, USA Network introduced a new logo and an on-air branding campaign called USA Studios. Developed as part of a multimillion-dollar promotional initiative, the campaign presented the network's programming through a fictional studio environment, with soundstages, production facilities and behind-the-scenes imagery appearing in promotional segments and program introductions. The redesign was intended to emphasize USA's identity as a general entertainment network rather than its earlier sports-oriented image.

During the mid-1990s, USA's children's programming included both USA Cartoon Express and the action-oriented USA Action Extreme Team. The two blocks were airing alongside each other by February 1996. By October 1998, the network's weekday morning schedule had shifted toward reruns of sitcoms and other entertainment programs, including America's Funniest Home Videos, The Jeff Foxworthy Show, Something So Right, The Single Guy, Boston Common and Wings.

In May 2000, USA Networks acquired North American Television, a joint venture involving the Canadian Broadcasting Corporation and Power Corporation of Canada, for approximately $103 million. The acquisition included the cable channels Trio, an arts and entertainment service, and Newsworld International, a news channel.

In June 2000, USA Networks lost a legal dispute over its rights to broadcast World Wrestling Federation programming after a Delaware court ruled that USA had not properly matched a competing offer from Viacom. The decision was upheld on appeal in September, allowing the WWF's Raw Is War to move from USA Network to TNN on September 25, 2000. Other WWF programming was also transferred to Viacom-owned channels under the agreement.

=== Vivendi ownership (2002–2004) ===
In May 2002, USA Networks sold its non-shopping television and film assets (including USA Network, the Sci-Fi Channel, Trio, USA Films (which was rechristened as Focus Features) and Studios USA) to Vivendi Universal for $10.3 billion. USA and the other channels were folded into Vivendi's Universal Television Group.

In July 2002, the channel debuted Monk, a comedy-drama police procedural that starred Tony Shalhoub as Adrian Monk, a former San Francisco police inspector-turned-consultant who suffers from various obsessive-compulsive behaviors that include the ability to pay attention to detail when solving crimes. It became one of USA Network's first breakout hit series, and ran for eight seasons until it ended on December 4, 2009.

=== NBCUniversal/Comcast ownership (2004–2026) ===
In 2003, General Electric (GE) agreed to merge NBC and its sibling companies with Vivendi Universal's North American-based filmed entertainment assets, including Universal Pictures and Universal Television Group in a multibillion-dollar purchase, renaming the merged company NBC Universal. GE retained an 80% ownership stake in the new company, while Vivendi retained a 20% stake. NBC Universal officially took over as owner of USA and its sibling cable channels (except for Newsworld International) in 2004. That year, USA premiered the sci-fi series The 4400.

=== "Characters Welcome", the "blue sky" era (2005–2016) ===
In 2005, USA Network introduced a new logo and associated marketing campaign, "Characters Welcome". The slogan was designed to help emphasize the wide range of programming the network offered, and to help USA Network establish itself more prominently as a brand. The launch of the campaign featured promos themed around the daily lives of characters from the network's programs. To contrast itself from the "grittier" offerings of other mainstream cable networks, USA Network's original programming during this era was marked by a focus on action and drama series with comedic elements and "optimistic" tones, referred to as a "blue sky" approach. Notable examples of this programming strategy included Psych (2006), Burn Notice (2007), and Royal Pains (2009). In October 2005, Raw returned to USA Network after Viacom did not renew its broadcasting agreement with the WWE.

On May 13, 2007 (in advance of NBC's 2007–08 fall upfronts presentation), NBC Universal announced that new episodes of Law & Order: Criminal Intent would be moved to USA Network beginning with the drama's seventh season in the fall of 2007; episodes would then be re-aired later in the season on NBC, most likely to shore up any programming holes created by the cancellation of a failed new series. Although this is not the first time a broadcast series has moved to cable (USA had acquired first-run rights to the revival of Alfred Hitchcock Presents from NBC in 1987, while The Paper Chase had moved beforehand from CBS to Showtime in 1983), it marked the first time that a series which moved its first-run episodes from broadcast to cable television would continue to air episodes on a broadcast network while it was still a first-run program. On December 7, 2007, it was announced that USA Network would continue broadcasting first-run episodes of Raw through at least 2010.

The June 1, 2008, premiere of In Plain Sight, starring Mary McCormack, was USA's highest-rated series premiere since the 2006 debut of Psych, with 5.3 million viewers. In early 2009, USA Network acquired the network television rights for 24 recent and upcoming Universal Pictures films, including Duplicity, Funny People, Frost/Nixon, Land of the Lost, Milk, and State of Play.

In 2011, control and majority ownership of then-parent NBC Universal passed from General Electric to Comcast. Comcast would buy out GE's remaining ownership in NBCUniversal two years later. USA Network was considered the key piece of the NBCUniversal-Comcast merger; Wunderlich Securities analyst Matthew Harrigan projected that USA contributed $9.5 billion to NBCUniversal's $44.8 billion value, with NBCUniversal contributing only $408 million. In 2014, the channel had dropped 18% in viewership and out of first place among the major cable channels. USA has been a key NBCUniversal asset accounting for one-third of advertising revenue for NBCUniversal Cable Entertainment Group and $1 billion in annual earnings over the past few years.

In April 2015, it was announced that WWE SmackDown would move to USA from sister network Syfy.

=== End of the "blue sky" era, expansion of sports coverage, and Versant era (2016–present) ===
In April 2016, USA Network unveiled a new branding campaign and slogan, "We the Bold". The campaign was designed to reflect the channel's current focus on "rich, captivating stories about unlikely heroes who defy the status quo, push boundaries and are willing to risk everything for what they believe in". USA had quietly discontinued the "Characters Welcome" tagline in the lead-up to the rebranding, whose associated programming shift was led by the premieres of Mr. Robot and Colony. Variety reported that the new programming strategy was designed to appeal to themes of "authenticity, resiliency, bravery and innovation". The Washington Post felt that the re-branding symbolically marked the end of USA's "blue sky" era, as the channel had been increasingly producing more "intense" series with darker themes. NBCUniversal marketing executive Alexandra Shapiro explained that the "Characters Welcome" campaign and associated programming was reflective of the "weirdly optimistic" mood of the network's key demographic at the time.

In August 2016, NBCUniversal acquired the television rights to the Harry Potter film franchise from 2018 through 2025, including the main film series and their spin-offs (with the first, Fantastic Beasts and Where to Find Them, to have its cable premiere in 2019), and other content. On cable, the films are to primarily be aired by USA Network and Syfy, and the deal also includes the ability for Universal Parks & Resorts to offer "exclusive content and events" related to the franchise (Universal Parks had already been involved in The Wizarding World of Harry Potter attractions). The deal succeeded one with Freeform; The Wall Street Journal reported the deal was valued around $250 million over the length of the agreement, making it one of the highest-valued film franchise deals. To launch the new rights, Syfy and USA both aired Harry Potter marathons over the July 13–15, 2018 weekend, airing all eight films (including directors' cuts of the first six) with limited commercial interruption.

Amid the growth of streaming services (including NBCUniversal's newly launched Peacock) and the decline of traditional cable television, USA Network began to cut back on scripted programming, in favor of reality shows, television events (including scripted miniseries), and live programming—the latter including WWE programs and sporting events. In 2020, the network cancelled Dare Me, The Purge, The Sinner, and Treadstone. With the announcement that NBCSN would shut down on December 31, 2021, it was subsequently revealed that USA and Peacock would collectively assume its remaining sports broadcasts.

In December 2023, Deadline Hollywood reported that USA Network was considering a return to original scripted series in the vein of the "blue sky" era, citing the recent resurgence in the popularity of Suits (which concluded in 2019) after the series was acquired by Netflix. The channel was reportedly targeting shows with budgets of $2–3 million per-episode. In June 2024, USA Network would order The Rainmaker, which was reported to be the first series to be produced via this plan.

In November 2024, Comcast announced its intent to spin off most of NBCUniversal's cable properties—including USA Network—as a new public company controlled by its shareholders, with its name later announced as Versant. Despite the separation, it will still carry NBC Sports programming covered under existing commitments, but a new USA Sports division was launched in November 2025 to encompass these rights, as well as new sports properties acquired separately from NBC Sports.

== Programming ==
USA Network has achieved a viewership foothold with its original programming; this began in the 1990s with initial hits such as Silk Stalkings, Duckman and La Femme Nikita, which were gradually followed in the following two decades by series such as Monk, Psych, Shooter, White Collar, Mr. Robot, Suits, Burn Notice and Royal Pains.

In addition to its original productions, the network airs syndicated reruns of current and former network series such as Law & Order: Special Victims Unit, Chicago P.D., Law & Order: Criminal Intent (which spent the final four seasons of its run as a first-run program on USA) and NCIS. The network also broadcasts a variety of films, airing primarily as part of its overnight and weekend schedule, and occasionally during primetime on nights when original programming or marathons of its acquired programs are not scheduled.

=== Sports programming ===
USA Network has a longstanding history with sports, dating back to its existence as the Madison Square Garden Network. The network carried Major League Baseball games on Thursday nights from 1979 to 1983, and the NHL on USA ran from 1979 to 1985. College Football on USA ran from 1980 to 1986, and its telecast of the 1981 Liberty Bowl was the first college bowl game to be exclusively broadcast on cable television. The NBA on USA also aired from 1979 to 1984, the first time that the NBA had a cable television partner.

USA aired a weekly boxing show, USA Tuesday Night Fights, which showcased bouts featuring up-and-coming boxers, until 1998, when the network canceled the 17-year-old series, saying it wanted to reach younger viewers. Tennis on USA aired professional tournaments in the United States from 1984 to 2008, and was the longtime cable home of the US Open before its cable television rights moved to ESPN2 and the Tennis Channel in 2009. The PGA Tour on USA covered the opening two rounds of the Masters Tournament from 1982 to 2007, Ryder Cup matches from 1989 to 2010, and various other events.

The USA Network aired most games of the NFL-run World League of American Football (later NFL Europe/Europa) in its first two seasons of operation in 1991 and 1992; one innovation introduced for the network's WLAF telecasts was the in-helmet camera.

Upon the 2004 purchase of Vivendi Universal by NBC, USA's sports division was immediately merged into NBC Sports. Since 2004, the network has broadcast select events from the Olympic Games, as part of an expansion of NBCUniversal's broadcast rights to the Summer and Winter Olympics that allowed several of the company's cable channels rights to telecast Olympic events live (some of which are later re-aired on tape delay on NBC as part of the network's primetime and late night Olympic coverage). USA Network also carried games from the International Ice Hockey Federation in 2006 and 2010.

During the 2014 Winter Olympics, USA aired Premier League soccer matches in lieu of sister channel NBCSN, due to that channel's full devotion to carrying coverage of Olympic events. After ratings success with those matches, USA began to air mid-afternoon Saturday games weekly during the 2015–16 season. USA also participates in NBC Sports' broader effort of carrying all ten Survival Sunday matches across its numerous channels during the final matchday of the Premier League season. Starting in 2015, USA Network was similarly incorporated into NBC's coverage of the Stanley Cup Playoffs. In 2016, USA aired three NASCAR races as overflow during the 2016 Summer Olympics.

In September 2020, a Notre Dame Fighting Irish football game was scheduled for USA Network due to NBC's commitments to the 2020 U.S. Open. Coverage of a primetime game against Clemson on November 7, 2020, was also briefly moved from NBC to USA Network due to NBC News coverage of a victory speech by president-elect Joe Biden.

With the shutdown of NBCSN at the end of 2021, USA Network once again became the main cable outlet of NBC Sports in 2022, with sports properties such as the Premier League, NASCAR, and the Olympics (including U.S. Olympic trials) moving to USA at this time. The U.S. Open, U.S. Women's Open, The Open Championship, and the Women's Open would move their early-round telecasts from Golf Channel to USA beginning in 2022. USA Network also carried eight games as part of the inaugural season of the revived USFL, and is one of the broadcast partners of the SuperMotocross World Championship and its Supercross and Motocross feeder series.

From 1984 to 2016, USA Network was the longtime home of the Westminster Kennel Club Dog Show.

=== Professional wrestling ===
USA Network is also the home of the professional wrestling company WWE. WWE (formerly WWF) has had a longstanding relationship with USA Network; by 1983, the network was already airing tape-delayed broadcasts of the promotion's Madison Square Garden events. In September 1983, Vince McMahon launched the weekly WWF All American Wrestling in a late Sunday morning slot on USA Network that Southwest Championship Wrestling had been paying for until it no longer could. WWF Prime Time Wrestling debuted on USA Network in 1985 and ran until it was succeeded by WWE's flagship cable program Raw. The series originally aired on USA Network from its debut in January 1993 (when the promotion was known as the World Wrestling Federation) until the series moved to TNN in September 2000, before returning to USA Network in October 2005.

On January 7, 2016, WWE's second flagship program SmackDown moved to USA Network from Syfy. In 2018, USA Network renewed its rights to Raw for five additional years, but lost the rights for SmackDown to Fox beginning in October 2019. In August 2019, WWE announced that its tertiary weekly program WWE NXT would return to USA Network on September 18, 2019, airing on Wednesday nights in a two-hour live format.

In September 2023, it was announced that SmackDown would return to USA in 2024 under a five-year deal with NBCUniversal, which would also include four annual primetime specials on NBC per-year—later revealed to be Saturday Night's Main Event. In November 2023, it was then announced that NXT would move to The CW, and in January 2024 it was announced that Raw would move to Netflix in 2025.

== High definition ==
High-definition simulcasts of USA Network sports coverage, and reruns of original programs produced in the format, were originally carried by Universal HD. In 2007, USA Network launched a HD feed.

== International ==
=== Canada ===
In February 2007, Shaw Communications submitted an application to the Canadian Radio-television and Telecommunications Commission (CRTC), to carry the USA Network in Canada as a foreign service that would be eligible for carriage by domestic cable and satellite providers (and to automatically allow all English-language general interest cable networks from the United States into Canada). However, because of programming rights issues with other Canadian specialty channels, certain programs would be subjected to blackout restrictions, including WWE Raw.

In September 2007, the CRTC refused Shaw's request to carry USA Network in Canada on the basis that the channel carried too much programming that overlapped with the English language digital cable specialty channel Mystery TV. However, on September 20, the CRTC stated that it would reconsider their denial of the eligible foreign carriage proposal for USA Network at a later date, when Shaw instead offered to carry the channel on the digital cable tiers of its Shaw Cable systems.

On October 17, 2024, NBCUniversal announced an agreement with Bell Media to launch a Canadian version of USA Network on January 1, 2025. The channel is a relaunch of Bell's Discovery Channel, following that company's loss of rights to the former Discovery, Inc. channel brands to Rogers Communications. This iteration of USA Network is operated by CTV Specialty Television—a joint venture of Bell Media and ESPN Inc.—stemming from the channel having originally been established by the ownership group of sister sports network TSN. The new channel mirrors some of USA Network's sports offerings via content sublicensed from TSN, including All Elite Wrestling and NASCAR Xfinity Series coverage. As a holdover from Discovery, the channel continues to air some of its existing original factual programming, including documentary series Mayday and reality show Highway Thru Hell.

=== Latin America ===
Regional versions of USA Network previously operated in certain Latin American countries (such as Argentina and Brazil); in September 2004, most of these services were renamed under the Universal Channel banner to take advantage of the more well-known brand, and to reduce the awkwardness of a channel branded with the initials of another nation.

In 2023 it was announced by NBCUniversal that the channel will be revived in Latin America during the Q4 of 2023 after 19 years of absence in the region. The channel will broadcast dramas like Briarpatch and Dr. Death, also the channel will be the official broadcaster of the Miss Universe pageant which was broadcast on November 18. USA Network was relaunched on October 1, 2023, replacing Syfy in the region.

== Logos ==
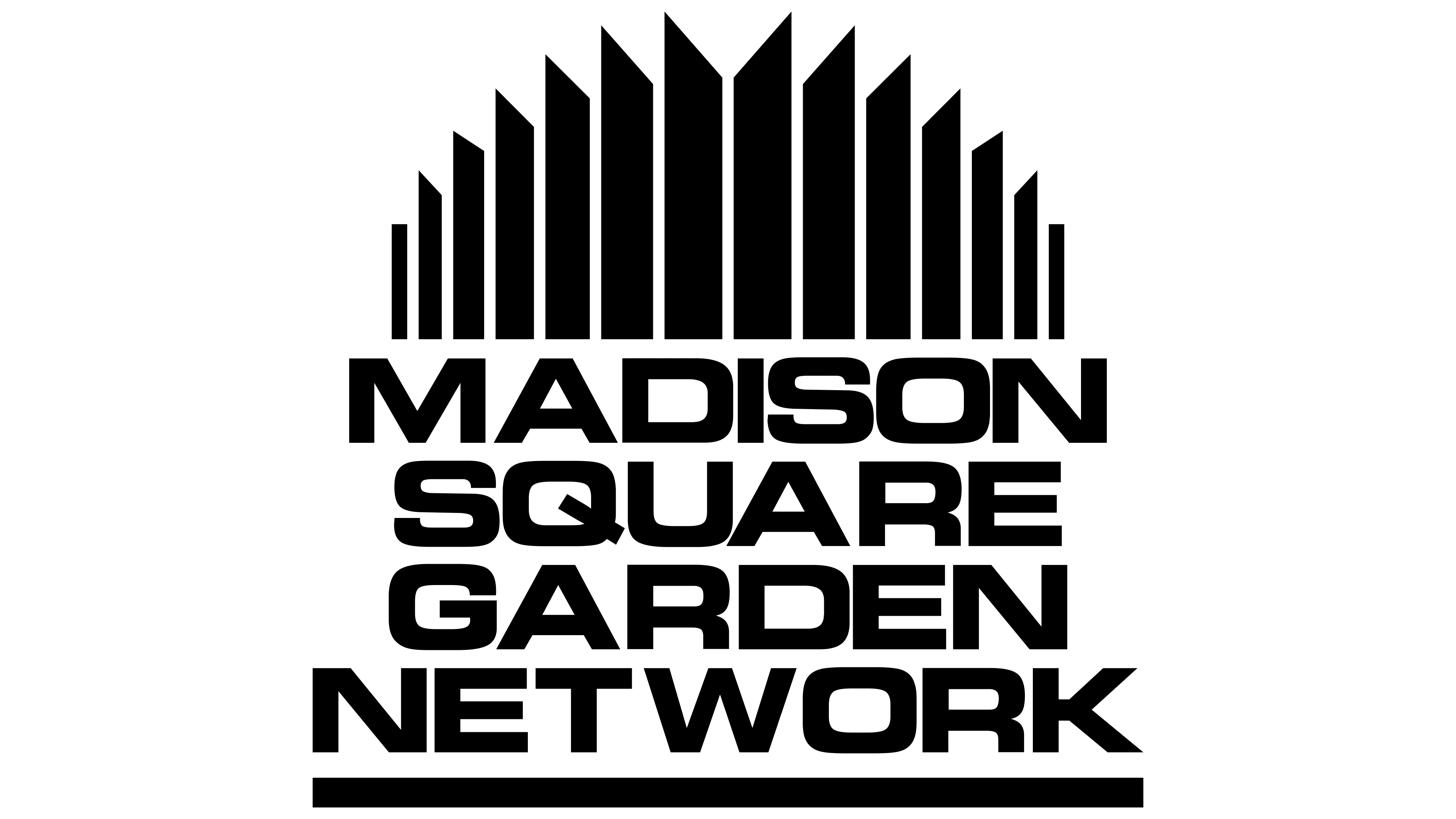
1977–1980 as Madison Square Garden Network

1980–1996

1996–1999

1999–2002

2002–2005

2005–present with network print
