= Bryan Hayes (radio host) =

Canadian radio host

- Born: June 6, 1983 (age 42); Toronto, Ontario, Canada
- Occupation: Sports radio host
- Employer: TSN
- Known for: Host of TSN 1050's OverDrive
- Father: Bill Hayes
Ice hockey career
- Height: 6 ft 2 in (188 cm)
- Weight: 200 lb (91 kg; 14 st 4 lb)
- Position: Defence
- Shot: Left
- Played for: Barrie Colts; Sarnia Sting
- NHL draft: Undrafted
- Playing career: 2000–2002

Bryan Hayes (born June 6, 1983) is a Canadian sports radio host who currently hosts OverDrive, TSN 1050's afternoon drive time sports radio show.

== Broadcasting career ==
Hayes worked at AM640 in Toronto early in his career, manning the 7:00 pm – 9:00 pm time slot and briefly served as co-host of The Bill Watters Show after his father, Bill Hayes, had been dismissed.

=== TSN ===
==== The Bryan Hayes Show ====
In April 2011, Bryan Hayes joined Toronto sports radio station TSN 1050, initially hosting The Bryan Hayes Show weekdays from 10:00 am – 12:00 pm.

==== Leafs Lunch ====
Hayes later partnered with former NHL hockey players Jeff O'Neill and Jamie McLennan to host Leafs Lunch weekdays from 12:00 pm – 2:00 pm.

==== Overdrive ====
On February 22, 2016, TSN 1050 debuted a new lineup that featured Hayes alongside O'Neill and McLennan on OverDrive, a new drive time sports radio show airing weekdays from 4:00 pm – 6:00 pm (previously 4:00 pm – 7:00 pm). The show competed against Sportnet 590 The Fan's Prime Time Sports hosted by Bob McCown. Overdrive proved to be a success and gained ground for TSN 1050 in the ratings.

== Playing career ==
Hayes is a former hockey player who played in the Ontario Hockey League from 2000 to 2002 for the Barrie Colts and the Sarnia Sting. In 2017, the Colts honoured Hayes as part of "OverDrive night" at the Barrie Molson Centre.

== Personal life ==
Hayes was born on June 6, 1983, in Toronto, Ontario. He is the son of Bill Hayes a former radio personality. He is married to Erin Hayes and has two daughters.

== Career statistics ==
=== Regular season and playoffs ===
			Regular season					Playoffs
Season	Team	League	GP	G	A	Pts	PIM	GP	G	A	Pts	PIM
2000–01	Barrie Colts	OHL	43	0	1	1	4	2	0	0	0	0
2001–02	North York Rangers	OPJHL	17	3	9	12	10	—	—	—	—	—
2001–02	Barie Colts	OHL	4	0	0	0	0	—	—	—	—	—
2001–02	Sarnia Sting	OHL	8	0	1	1	6	—	—	—	—	—
2002–03	Vaughan Vipers	OPJHL	21	4	7	11	24	—	—	—	—	—
