= CTV Specialty Television =

Canadian media company

CTV Specialty Television Inc.

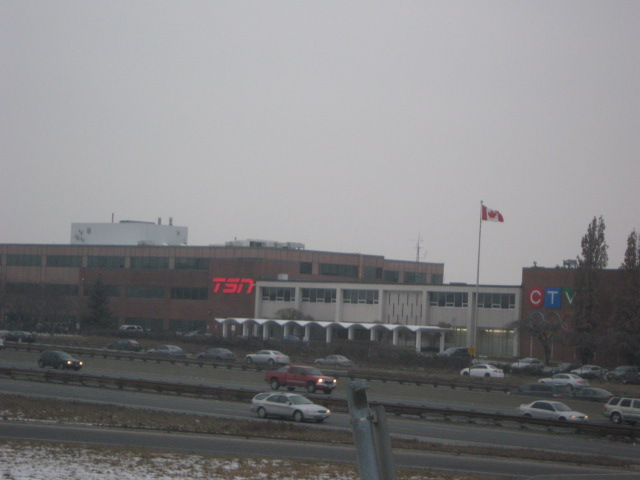
- CTV Specialty Television's headquarters at 9 Channel Nine Court
- Formerly: Labatt Communications, Inc. (1984–1996); NetStar Communications, Inc. (1996–2000)
- Company type: Joint venture
- Industry: Mass media
- Founded: 1984; 42 years ago
- Headquarters: 9 Channel Nine Court, Scarborough, Ontario, Canada
- Area served: Canada
- Key people: Sean Cohan (president, Bell Media; James Pitaro (chairman, ESPN Inc.)
- Owners: Bell Media (80%); ESPN, LLC (20%)
- Divisions: Dome Productions, Inc.
- Website: bellmedia.ca tsn.ca

CTV Specialty Television Inc. is a Canadian media company that is a joint venture between Bell Media subsidiary of BCE Inc. (also known as Bell Canada Enterprises, the owner of telecommunications company Bell Canada) and ESPN, LLC, a joint venture of The Walt Disney Company (72%; via ABC Inc.), Hearst Communications (18%), and the National Football League (10%), that operates a number of specialty channels such as The Sports Network (TSN) and USA Network.

The company was formed in 1984 as Labatt Communications, Inc. by brewer John Labatt Ltd.; but long after its acquisition by Interbrew in 1995, LCI was sold to four local investors and ESPN Inc. in 1996 which changed the name of the company to NetStar Communications Inc. NetStar was then acquired by CTV Inc. in 2000 and later merged with Bell Canada alongside The Globe and Mail to form Bell Globemedia and renamed to its current entity afterwards.

== History ==
This company was founded in 1984 when brewer John Labatt Ltd., which owned the Toronto Blue Jays at that time, launched Canada's 24 hour sports channel The Sports Network (TSN). Its French counterpart, Réseau des sports (RDS) went on the air five years later. The company also operated and established Viewers Choice and SkyVision Entertainment, both founded in 1991. With partnership of Discovery Communications, Labatt launched the Canadian version of the Discovery Channel on December 31, 1994.

In 1995, when Belgian brewer Interbrew announced it purchased John Labatt, a consortium of four Canadian investors—Stephen Bronfman (22.5%), the Caisse (22.5%), Reitmans (16.5%), and senior management (6.5%)—along with ESPN (32%), took over the company. The sale was approved by the Canadian Radio-television and Telecommunications Commission on March 15, 1996, and the company was rebranded to NetStar Communications Inc.

After a takeover attempt by CanWest Global that was vetoed by ESPN, CTV Inc. (the former Baton Broadcasting Inc.) announced a friendly bid to take over NetStar Communications in early 1999, with CRTC approval on March 24, 2000. After acquiring Netstar, the CRTC required CTV to divest itself of either Netstar's TSN or their own Sportsnet; they chose to sell the latter to Rogers. NetStar was then renamed again to CTV Specialty Television Inc. after its acquisition.

Later, CTV Inc. merged into Bell Canada's Bell Globemedia, but was renamed to CTVglobemedia in 2007 and again to Bell Media in 2011.

== Assets ==
=== Active ===
==== Television ====
- CTV Nature Channel (formerly Discovery Science)
- CTV Speed Channel (formerly Discovery Velocity)
- CTV Wild Channel (formerly Animal Planet)
- Réseau des sports (RDS)
  - RDS2
  - RDS Info
- The Sports Network (TSN)
  - TSN1 (British Columbia, Alberta and Yukon)
  - TSN2
  - TSN3 (Northwest Territories, Nunavut, Manitoba and Saskatchewan)
  - TSN4 (Ontario excluding the Ottawa Valley)
  - TSN5 (Atlantic Canada, Ottawa Valley and Quebec)
- USA Network (formerly Discovery Channel)

==== Productions ====
Dome Productions (jointly owned with Rogers Media Inc.) — a multi-platform production company that operates a fleet of 18 television production mobiles, one production/uplink truck, and three KU uplink tractors. For over 30 years, Dome's head office was located in the Rogers Centre in Toronto. The company has since moved to 130 Merton Street in 2023.

=== Defunct ===
- ESPN Classic (ceased operations in 2023)
- Exploration Production Inc. and Exploration Distribution Inc. (56.06% owned by CTV Specialty) were Discovery Channel's in-house production and distribution companies. In February 2021, EPI and EDI were subsumed into Bell Media Studios.
- SkyVision Entertainment (sold in 1996, renamed to Fireworks Entertainment, but folded in 2011)
- NHL Network (21.42% owned by CTV Specialty via the NHL Network Inc., joint venture of National Hockey League consortium (NHL, Edmonton Oilers and Calgary Flames - 58%) and Insight Sports (20.58%) - ceased operations in 2015)
- Viewers Choice (ceased operations in 2014)
- WTSN (ceased operations in 2003)

== See also ==
- Bell Canada
- Media ownership in Canada
- List of Canadian television channels
