= Bill Berg (ice hockey) =

Canadian ice hockey player

- Born: October 21, 1967 (age 57); St. Catharines, Ontario, Canada
- Height: 6 ft 1 in (185 cm)
- Weight: 205 lb (93 kg; 14 st 9 lb)
- Position: Left wing
- Shot: Left
- Played for: New York Islanders; Toronto Maple Leafs; New York Rangers; Ottawa Senators
- NHL draft: 59th overall, 1986; New York Islanders
- Playing career: 1987–1999

William Daniel Berg (born October 21, 1967) is a Canadian former professional ice hockey winger who played in the National Hockey League (NHL) for four teams between 1988 and 1999.

== Early life ==
Berg was born in St. Catharines, Ontario. Berg was a member of the Springfield Indians of the American Hockey League, with whom he won a Calder Cup in 1990.

== Career ==
Berg started his National Hockey League career with the New York Islanders in 1988–89. He also played for the Toronto Maple Leafs, New York Rangers, and Ottawa Senators. He retired after the 1998–99 campaign. In 2008, Berg began coaching high school hockey at Ridley College.

Berg served as a hockey analyst on the NHL Network's NHL on the Fly and On the Fly: Final. He previously appeared on the radio program Hockey Central at Noon on CJCL, which was also simulcast on Rogers Sportsnet.

== Career statistics ==
=== Regular season and playoffs ===
			Regular season					Playoffs
Season	Team	League	GP	G	A	Pts	PIM	GP	G	A	Pts	PIM
1985–86	Toronto Marlboros	OHL	64	3	35	38	143	4	0	0	0	19
1986–87	Toronto Marlboros	OHL	57	3	15	18	138	—	—	—	—	—
1986–87	Springfield Indians	AHL	4	1	1	2	4	—	—	—	—	—
1987–88	Peoria Rivermen	IHL	5	0	1	1	8	7	0	3	3	31
1987–88	Springfield Indians	AHL	76	6	26	32	148	—	—	—	—	—
1988–89	Springfield Indians	AHL	69	17	32	49	122	—	—	—	—	—
1988–89	New York Islanders	NHL	7	1	2	3	10	—	—	—	—	—
1989–90	Springfield Indians	AHL	74	12	42	54	74	15	5	12	17	22
1990–91	New York Islanders	NHL	78	9	14	23	67	—	—	—	—	—
1991–92	Capital District Islanders	AHL	3	0	2	2	16	—	—	—	—	—
1991–92	New York Islanders	NHL	47	5	9	14	28	—	—	—	—	—
1992–93	New York Islanders	NHL	22	6	3	9	49	—	—	—	—	—
1992–93	Toronto Maple Leafs	NHL	58	7	8	15	54	21	1	1	2	18
1993–94	Toronto Maple Leafs	NHL	83	8	11	19	93	18	1	2	3	10
1994–95	Toronto Maple Leafs	NHL	32	5	1	6	26	7	0	1	1	4
1995–96	Toronto Maple Leafs	NHL	23	1	1	2	33	—	—	—	—	—
1995–96	New York Rangers	NHL	18	2	1	3	8	10	1	0	1	0
1996–97	New York Rangers	NHL	67	8	6	14	37	3	0	0	0	2
1997–98	New York Rangers	NHL	67	1	9	10	55	—	—	—	—	—
1998–99	Ottawa Senators	NHL	44	2	2	4	28	2	0	0	0	0
1998–99	Hartford Wolf Pack	AHL	16	4	7	11	23	—	—	—	—	—
NHL totals			546	55	67	122	488	61	3	4	7	34

== Awards and honors ==
Award	Year
AHL
Calder Cup (Springfield Indians)	1990
