= ESPN Canada =

ESPN Canada may refer to one of the following:

- ESPN Classic (Canada)
- The Sports Network, an English cable station partially owned by ESPN in Canada
- Réseau des sports, a French cable station partially owned by ESPN in Canada
