= OverDrive (radio show) =

- Genre: Sports talk
- Running time: Weekdays: 120 minutes (4:00 pm – 6:00 pm)
- Country of origin: Canada
- Language: English
- Home station: TSN 1050
- TV adaptations: TSN
- Hosted by: Bryan Hayes
- Starring: Jeff O'Neill; Jamie McLennan
- Original release: February 22, 2016 – present
- Sponsored by: FanDuel
- Website: tsn.ca/overdrive

OverDrive is a drive time sports radio show hosted by Bryan Hayes alongside Jeff O'Neill and Jamie McLennan. The show airs from 4 to 6 pm ET on TSN 1050 in Toronto, simulcasted on TSN and iHeartRadio, and as a podcast.

== History ==
The show originally aired as Leafs Lunch weekdays from 12 to 2 pm. On February 22, 2016, TSN 1050 introduced a revamped weekday lineup where Andi Petrillo became host of Leafs Lunch and Bryan Hayes, Jamie McLennan, and Jeff O'Neill became hosts of the new drive time program weekdays from 4 to 7 pm, with the 4 pm and 5 pm hours being simulcasted on TSN4, and the 6 pm hour being simulcasted on TSN2.

The show used to feature Ray Ferraro as a daily guest in the 5 pm hour before he expanded his role at ESPN in 2021.

On February 25, 2022, the show's three hosts as well as well as Leafs Lunch co-host and Overdrive contributor Michael DiStefano (aka Al's Brother) were announced as celebrity coaches for the CHL/NHL Top Prospects Game.

On April 3, 2023, FanDuel was announced as the show's new presenting sponsor. The show's previous sponsors have included Pinty's and The Source.

In September 2025, the show's airtime was cut back from three hours to two hours, now airing from 4 to 6 pm, followed by "OverDrive replay" from 6 to 7 pm.

== Format ==
OverDrive airs weekdays on TSN 1050 and is simulcasted on TSN. The show is a sports talk show featuring insights, interviews, stories, and banter.

== See also ==
- Leafs Lunch
