= J. P. Arencibia =

American baseball player and coach (born 1986)

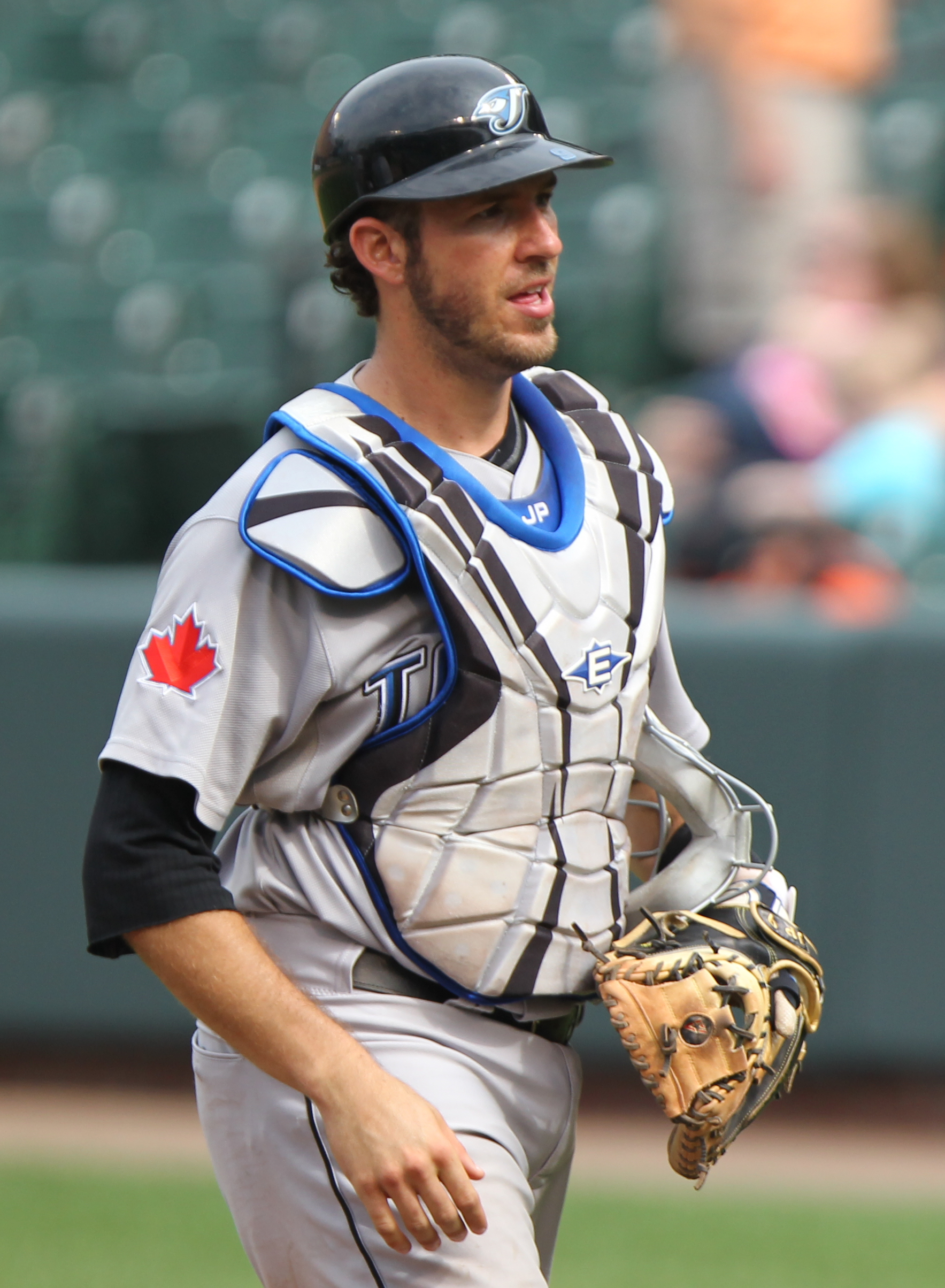
- Arencibia with the Toronto Blue Jays in 2011

New York Mets – No. 68
- Catcher
- Born: January 5, 1986 (age 40); Miami, Florida, U.S.
- Batted: Right Threw: Right

MLB debut
- August 7, 2010, for the Toronto Blue Jays

Last MLB appearance
- October 1, 2015, for the Tampa Bay Rays

MLB statistics
- Batting average: .212
- Home runs: 80
- Runs batted in: 245
- Stats at Baseball Reference

Teams
- As player: Toronto Blue Jays (2010–2013); Texas Rangers (2014); Tampa Bay Rays (2015); As coach: New York Mets (2026–present)

Jonathan Paul Arencibia (born January 5, 1986) is an American former professional baseball catcher who is the catching coach for the New York Mets of Major League Baseball (MLB). He played in MLB for the Toronto Blue Jays, Texas Rangers, and Tampa Bay Rays from 2010 to 2015.

== Amateur career ==
Arencibia attended Westminster Christian School in Miami. He played football and basketball in high school, but excelled in baseball. He later played for the Under-18 Florida Bombers alongside future major leaguers Mat Latos, Gaby Sánchez, Yonder Alonso, and Jon Jay.

Arencibia attended the University of Tennessee in Knoxville and played college baseball for the Tennessee Volunteers. He won the USA Baseball Richard W. "Dick" Case Player of the Year Award in 2006. Prior to the 2007 draft, questions were raised about Arencibia's defensive abilities as a catcher. After drafting him, however, the Blue Jays decided to keep him as a catcher, rather than convert him to another position such as first base. Arencibia's teammates at Tennessee included Chase Headley, Luke Hochevar, and Julio Borbon. In the summer of 2006, Arencibia played baseball in Cuba with David Price, and was drafted 20 positions behind Price in 2007.

== Professional career ==
=== Toronto Blue Jays ===
==== 2007–2010 ====
Arencibia was drafted 21st overall by the Toronto Blue Jays in the 2007 MLB draft. He was assigned to Toronto's Low A ball affiliate, the Auburn Doubledays of the New York–Penn League. Arencibia struggled during the early part of the season but hit well during the stretch and into the playoffs, helping the Doubledays win the NY-Penn League championship. He began the 2008 season with the Dunedin Blue Jays of the Florida State League. By the FSL all-star break, he led the league or was near the top in many offensive categories, finishing the first half of the season batting .315 with 13 homers, 22 doubles and 62 RBI. He was named as the starting catcher for the Western Division in the FSL All-Star Game.

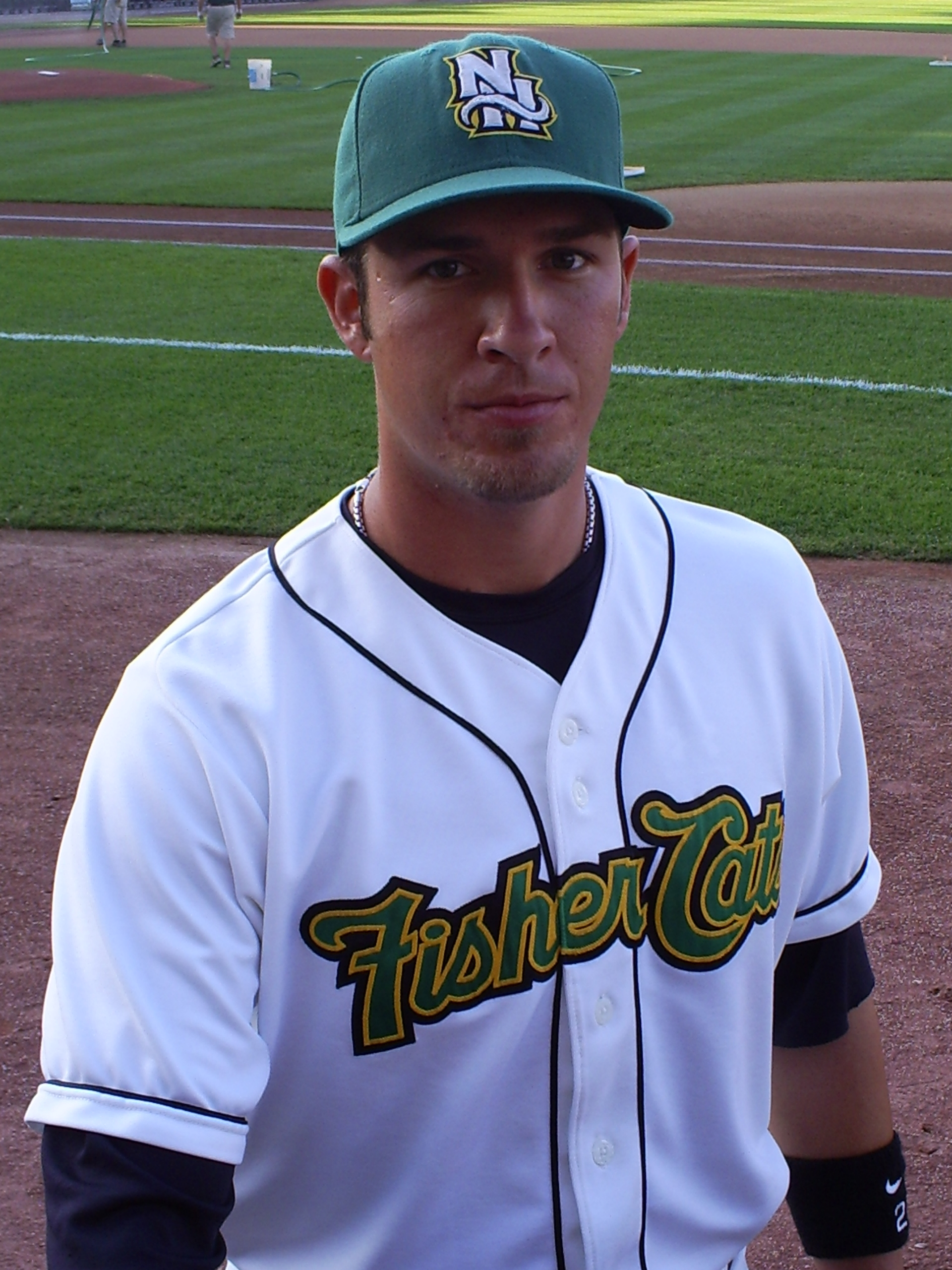
Arencibia with the New Hampshire Fisher Cats in 2008

After the game, the Blue Jays promoted him to their Double-A team, the New Hampshire Fisher Cats of the Eastern League. During the off-season of 2008, Arencibia took part in the Arizona Fall League as a member of the Phoenix Desert Dogs. For the 2009 season, Arencibia was promoted to the Las Vegas 51s, the Blue Jays' Triple-A affiliate in the Pacific Coast League.

Arencibia was called up to MLB on August 4, 2010, to replace the injured John Buck, who had been placed on the 15-day disabled list for a right thumb laceration. At the time of his promotion, Arencibia was batting .303 with a PCL leading 31 home runs and 79 RBI He started in his first MLB game for the Toronto Blue Jays on August 7, 2010, against the Tampa Bay Rays. In his first MLB at-bat, Arencibia hit a two-run home run on the first pitch from James Shields, becoming the 28th player in history to hit a home run on his first MLB pitch. In his following plate appearances, he hit a double, a single and then a solo home run and received a curtain call from the fans at the Rogers Centre while finishing the game just a triple shy of hitting for the cycle. Arencibia became the fifth player (at the time) ever to hit two home runs in his first game. In addition, he became the first person in the modern era with four hits and two home runs in an MLB debut, a feat set 121 years before by Columbus Solons catcher Charlie Reilly.

Arencibia is also the first Blue Jay to have four hits in a debut, and the first Blue Jay since Junior Félix to hit a home run on the first pitch in his first MLB at bat. On August 18, 2010, Arencibia was optioned back to Triple-A Las Vegas to make room for the return of John Buck from the disabled list. He was recalled from Las Vegas on September 1.

==== 2011 ====
Arencibia was the starting catcher at the Blue Jays' 2011 home opener. He hit the team's first home run of the season, a 2-run homer to deep center. He finished the night with 2 home runs and a triple. On May 7, he broke up Justin Verlander's perfect game, being walked after a 12 pitch at-bat. On June 3 against the Baltimore Orioles, Arencibia hit his first career grand slam in an 8–4 victory. As of June 4, Arencibia led all major league rookies with 9 home runs, which is already a Blue Jays club record for a rookie catcher, surpassing the previous record of five shared by Pat Borders (1988) and Greg Myers (1990).

In a game against the Kansas City Royals on August 25, Arencibia hit his 20th home run of the season, tying the single season record for home runs by Blue Jays catchers (John Buck hit 20 in 2010). While playing at home against the Tampa Bay Rays on August 29, Arencibia stole a base, his first career stolen base on his first attempt. In a game against the Boston Red Sox on September 7, Arencibia hit his 21st home run of the season, breaking a tie with John Buck for most home runs by a Blue Jays' catcher in a single season. He is one of three rookies in Blue Jays history to hit 21 or more home runs, along with Eric Hinske (24 in 2002) and Rowdy Tellez (21 in 2019).

He led all major league catchers in passed balls in 2011, with 12.

==== 2012 ====
On Opening Day 2012, Arencibia hit a game-winning 3-run home run in the 16th inning against the Cleveland Indians. It was the longest game in Opening Day history in terms of innings.

On May 16, 2012, Arencibia reached 100 RBI for his career in a 4–1 win against the New York Yankees. The following day, in a game against the New York Mets, Arencibia set a career high for RBI in a game with 6, in a 14–5 win. Arencibia also hit 2 home runs, giving him the first 3-game home run streak of his career. Arencibia was named AL Player of the Week for May 14–20, hitting .360 with 4 home runs, 10 RBI, 7 runs scored, and a slugging percentage of .920. He is the first catcher in Blue Jays history to win the award. On July 25, in a game against the Oakland Athletics, Arencibia was hit on the right hand by a pitch while catching. Arencibia finished the inning, but left the game for precautionary reasons. X-rays came back positive for a fracture, and he was expected to miss 6 weeks. Arencibia began a rehab assignment with the Class-A Dunedin Blue Jays on September 2. He finished the season with a .233 batting average, 18 home runs, and 56 RBI.

==== 2013 ====
On May 6, 2013, Arencibia hit a two-run home run to give the Blue Jays an 8–7 lead against the Tampa Bay Rays, in a game where they had been down 7–0 after the third inning. The comeback victory was the largest by the Blue Jays since a 12–11 win in 2007, also against Tampa Bay. It was to be a rare 2013 highlight for Arencibia, who was a consistent target of criticism from both the fans and the press for his poor statistical performance that year.

It's unfortunate to see how words are twisted to make false stories. I give way too much of myself to have others try and make me out to something/someone I'm not. Solution. I make myself very accessible with constant charitable events, and opening up to social media for the fans. I will no longer be on twitter. Thanks to all the fans who support and praying for the others that hate. God Bless.

— Arencibia's final tweets before closing his Twitter account.

Arencibia was a guest on Brady & Lang, a radio program broadcast on Sportsnet 590, on July 4, 2013. When asked for his opinion of Gregg Zaun and Dirk Hayhurst, two commentators (and former Blue Jays players) employed by Rogers Sportsnet who had criticized Arencibia's performance in recent broadcasts, Arencibia stated that "...speaking for myself and the team, there's not one person in our clubhouse that respects those guys". Arencibia stated that Hayhurst was a "below average player" during their time together in Triple-A, and also made mention of Zaun's link to the Mitchell Report, which named several players suspected of using performance-enhancing drugs during their careers. After setting off a firestorm of comments from fans, some defending his position, others against it, on July 23, Arencibia shut down his Twitter account. (It was later reopened by a fan group called "Team JP" on August 15.)

Arencibia finished the 2013 season batting below the Mendoza Line, hitting just .194, although he did hit 21 home runs, placing him second amongst MLB catchers to Matt Wieters, and 55 RBIs. However, his extremely low batting average, coupled with drawing only 18 walks over the course of the entire season, led to an historically low OPS for Arencibia: with a .592 OPS, he became the first player in major league history to reach 20 homers in a season and still post a sub-.600 OPS. (The next lowest OPS for a 20-homer season was .649 by Cleveland's Willie Kirkland in 1962.)

Arencibia was non-tendered on December 2, 2013, making him a free agent for the first time in his career.

=== Texas Rangers ===
Arencibia signed a one-year contract worth $1.8 million with Texas on December 10, 2013. Arencibia was optioned to the Triple-A Round Rock Express on May 20, 2014, and outrighted to Round Rock on May 21. On July 17, Arencibia was re-added to the 40-man roster when Carlos Peña was designated for assignment.

On July 29 at Globe Life Park, Arencibia dominated New York Yankees' pitching with four extra base-hits in five at bats (two doubles, two home runs, one of them being a grand slam) and batted in seven of eleven Rangers runs, but the Rangers fell 12–11. On August 13, 2014, Arencibia took the mound for the first time in his career and pitched the 9th inning for the Rangers who were losing to the Tampa Bay Rays 10–1. He pitched a scoreless inning, throwing 10 pitches, 6 for strikes, and allowed one hit for a single. His 10 pitches ranged from 70 to 74 miles per hour. He was assigned outright to Triple-A Round Rock on October 6. On October 9, it was announced that Arencibia had declined the assignment to Round Rock, becoming a free agent.

=== Tampa Bay Rays ===
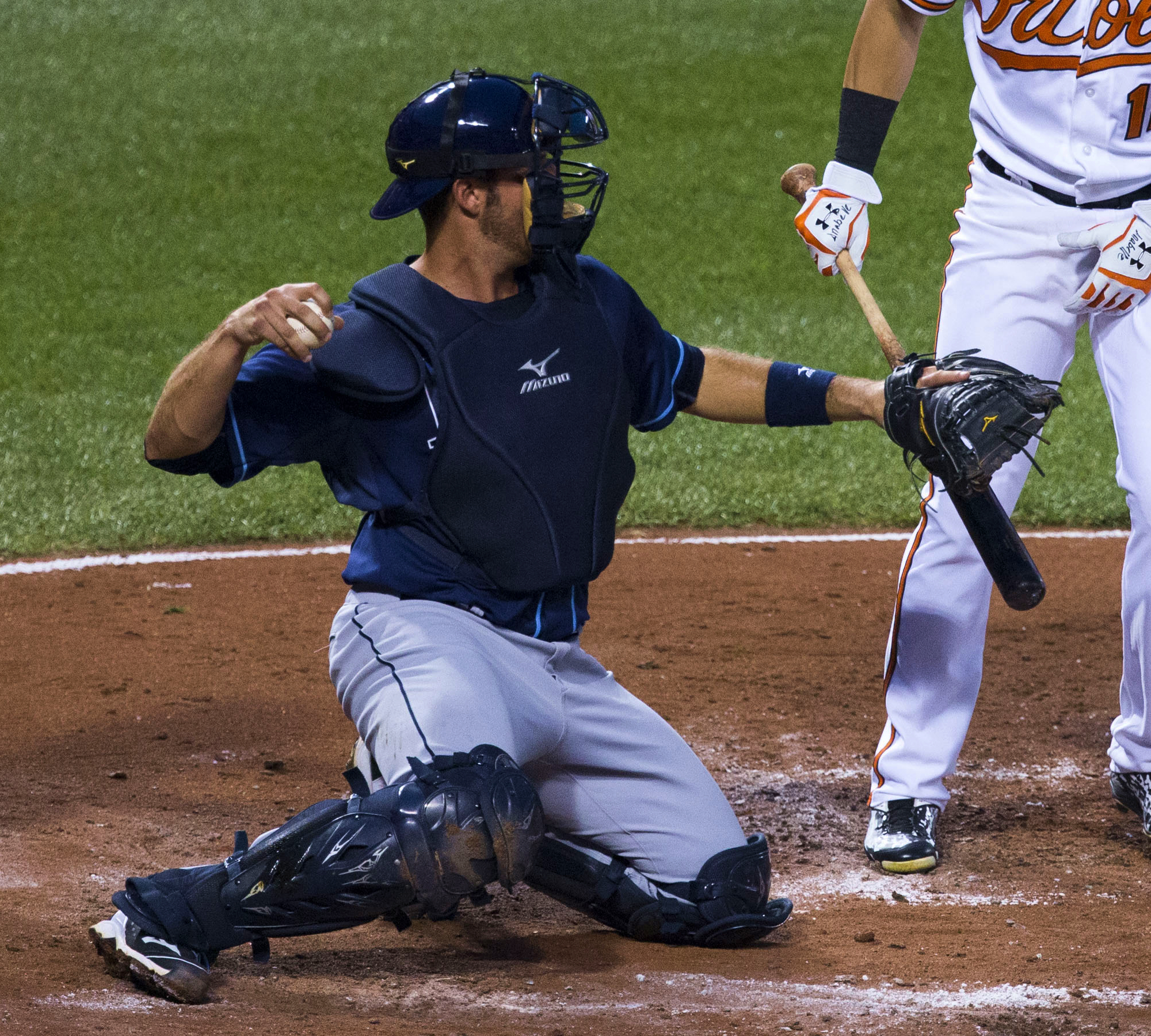
Arencibia with the Tampa Bay Rays in 2015

On January 8, 2015, the Baltimore Orioles announced that they had signed Arencibia to a minor league contract with an invitation to spring training. He was released by the Orioles on April 9. On April 16, he signed a minor league contract with the Tampa Bay Rays, and was assigned to the Triple-A Durham Bulls. Arencibia was called up by the Rays on August 26, after Curt Casali was placed on the disabled list. Arencibia was designated for assignment on November 20, 2015, and released on November 23. He appeared in 24 games for the Rays, batting .310 with 6 home runs and 17 RBI.

=== Philadelphia Phillies ===
The Philadelphia Phillies announced on December 14, 2015, that Arencibia had been signed to a minor league contract with an invitation to spring training. He was granted his release on May 16, 2016. In 12 games for the Triple-A Lehigh Valley IronPigs, Arencibia hit .167 with one home run and two RBI.

=== Tampa Bay Rays (second stint) ===
On May 20, 2016, Arencibia signed a minor league contract to return to the Tampa Bay Rays organization, and was assigned to the Triple–A Durham Bulls. He remained in Triple-A Durham for the rest of the 2016 season, and batted .252 with 14 home runs and 47 RBI in 78 games played. Arencibia elected free agency following the season on November 7.

Arencibia announced his retirement from professional baseball on January 18, 2017.

== Coaching career ==
On January 9, 2023, Arencibia announced that he was joining the New York Mets as a bench coach for the Triple–A Syracuse Mets.

On November 19, 2025, Arencibia was promoted to catching coach for the New York Mets.

== Broadcasting career ==
Arencibia was named a studio pre and postgame analyst for Miami Marlins broadcasts on Fox Sports Florida on February 12, 2019.

== Personal life ==
Arencibia was born in Miami to Cuban parents. His maternal grandparents were of Basque and Canarian descent, and immigrated to the United States from Cuba when his mother was two years old. He mostly grew up in a single parent home with his mother Irene.

He lives in Nashville in the off-season. In 2013, Arencibia was reported to be dating Kimberly Perry of The Band Perry. The couple was engaged on September 30, 2013 and were married on June 12, 2014. In March 2018, the couple filed for divorce.

In early 2021, Arencibia was linked to conservative political commentator and television presenter Tomi Lahren. In March 2021, he apologized publicly for threatening a comedian who had "trolled" Lahren about Donald Trump losing the 2020 United States presidential election. In September 2021, Arencibia and Lahren announced their engagement. On October 21, 2022, they were married in Nashville.

== See also ==
- List of Major League Baseball players with a home run in first major league at bat
