= Christine Simpson =

Canadian television personality (born 1964)

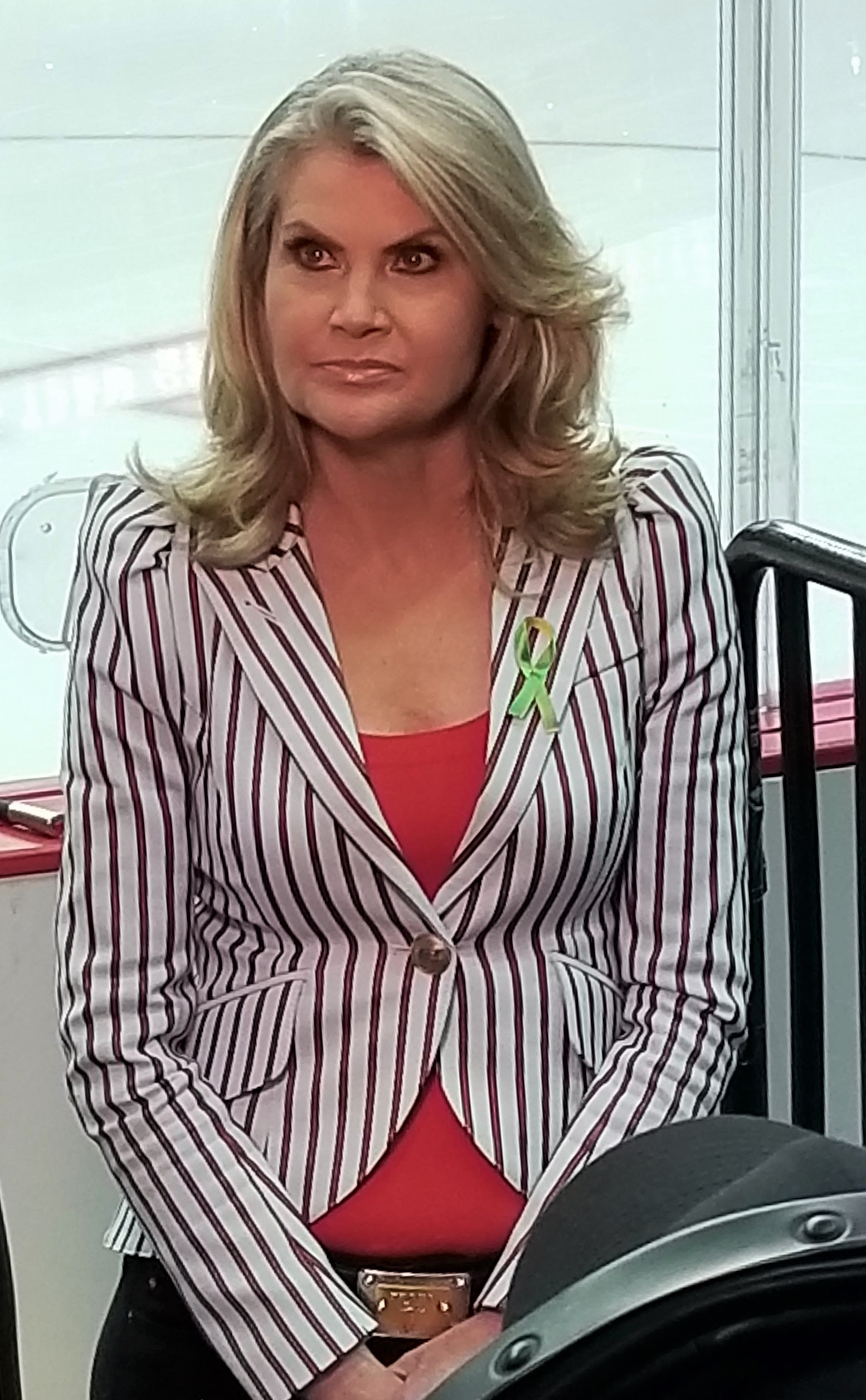
- Stanley Cup Playoffs - 2018
- Born: October 5, 1964 (age 62); London, Ontario, Canada

Christine Laura Simpson (born October 5, 1964) is a Canadian television personality, best known as a hockey reporter, host and interviewer. She is a graduate of the University of Western Ontario in London, Ontario.

== Family ==
Simpson's mother Marion was a cheerleader for the University of Western Ontario Mustangs and an Olympic sprinter. Don Simpson, her father, played for the Western Mustangs in the mid-1950s.

Simpson is the younger sister of former CHL Player-of-the-Year and New York Islanders' draft pick Dave Simpson and the older sister of two-time Stanley Cup champion, and former Edmonton Oilers' forward, Craig Simpson, who is currently an analyst with Hockey Night in Canada on CBC. Simpson's nephew, Dillon Simpson, was drafted by the Edmonton Oilers.

== Career ==
Simpson was the Marketing Manager at the Hockey Hall of Fame in Toronto, Ontario, for several years and the first in-arena host for the Toronto Maple Leafs before making the move to broadcasting. Her first network television job was with Rogers Sportsnet (previously known as CTV Sportsnet) when the Canadian sports channel launched in 1998. She spent 10 years with the network as a hockey features reporter, profiling the NHL's top players and personalities, and as the host of Showtime with Chris Simpson segments which featured entertainment & sports stories.

She has also been a rinkside reporter for National Hockey League broadcasts in the United States with ABC, ESPN and NBCSN (previously known as OLN and then as Versus). She was the host of "Captains," a weekly show profiling NHL team captains on the NHL Network in the United States and Canada. Simpson has also been a "Hockey Insider" with the Bill Watters Show on AM640 Radio in Toronto, Ontario. During the 2010 Winter Olympics in Vancouver, she was the host of Centre Ice with Chris Simpson at Molson Canadian Hockey House. On October 19, 2010, it was announced that Simpson had joined regional sports network MSG Plus as a host for the New Jersey Devils broadcast team. On September 6, 2011, Simpson re-joined Rogers Sportsnet in Toronto as their hockey features reporter.

In 2010, Simpson made her feature-film début in Saw 3D. She played talk-show host Donna Evans.
