= BarDown (website) =

Social media brand owned by The Sports Network

BarDown is an online media brand of The Sports Network (TSN) focused on pop culture and attracting a younger audience. Created in 2014, the website and YouTube content have become one of TSN's most popular segments.

== History ==
On March 4, 2014, Dave Krikst created the BarDown brand for TSN's web and social platforms, including a YouTube channel, focused on attracting a younger audience. The intent was to merge the pop-culture style of BuzzFeed with the sports content on TSN. Krikst later described BarDown as "a place where you probably get to practise your craft.” The name BarDown was chosen for its reference to the hockey term and that the "content will come from all sports." The subsidiary originally began solely focused on hockey; they posted viral content and included branded content and advertising on their similarity named website.

In 2019, the main contributors to BarDown content were TSN producers Jesse Pollock, Corwin McCallum, Sam Glisserman, Daniel Zakrzewski, Eric Kirk, and Luca Celebre. As their content developed into YouTube videos, BarDown also gained their sponsors as a subsidiary and their videos averaged more than 620,000 views. The producers' success from BarDown led them to appear in more traditional TSN coverage such as pregame segments and part-time anchor roles on SportsCentre. Another member of BarDown, Julia Tocheri, went on to host Leafs Lunch before it was cancelled in 2023. In September 2020, Bardown launched the BarDown Podcast, hosted by McCallum and Zakrzewski. In honour of their five-year anniversary on YouTube, EA Sports added a BarDown-themed jersey in their World of Chel and Hockey Ultimate Team game modes. The jersey had been previously worn by BarDown members at their beer league games prior to the COVID-19 lockdown. On 4 September 2024, Corwin announced he was leaving Bardown.
