= NHL Tonight =

Ice hockey tv program

- Also known as: NHL on the Fly: Final
- Genre: Sports
- Country of origin: Canada
- Original language: English

Original release
- Network: NHL Network
- Release: December 2011

NHL Tonight (formerly NHL on the Fly: Final) is the flagship show on the NHL Network in Canada and the United States. The show made its debut under its current title in December 2011. It airs nightly at 6:00 pm throughout the NHL season carrying highlights from all of the day's games and includes live “look-ins” of any west coast games still in progress.

The show airs immediately after NHL Now on weekdays, the network's in-game studio show with live “look-ins” of all current games, and was previously entitled NHL on the Fly: Final. It used to last either 30 or 60 minutes depending on the number of games that night, but in its current incarnation, the show is an hour long, no matter how many games are played that evening. It should not be confused with ESPN's National Hockey Night which ended after the 2003-2004 NHL season.

The show was formerly simulcast occasionally on TSN for the national audience when the channel aired regional Toronto Maple Leafs action in Ontario. TSN no longer airs regional-only games of this nature.

As of the beginning of the 2007–08 NHL season, the NHL Network is now available in the United States.

== Personalities ==
=== Current ===
==== Hosts ====
- Tony Luftman
- Erika Wachter Barnes
- Jamison Coyle
- Bill Pidto
- Keith Irizarry
- Adnan Virk
- Steve Gelbs
- Lauren Gardner
- Kathryn Tappen
- Bill Spaulding

==== Analysts ====
- Mike Rupp
- Dave Reid
- Kevin Weekes
- EJ Hradek
- Mike Johnson
- Cory Schneider
- Thomas Hickey
- Scott Hartnell
- Jason Demers
- Brian Boyle
- Devan Dubnyk
- Steve Konroyd
- John Torchetti
- Ken Daneyko
- Billy Jaffe
- Bill Lindsay

=== Former ===
- Kay Whitmore
- Andi Petrillo
- Bob McGill
- Todd Lewis
- Lauren Veltman
- Jay Onrait
- Jamie McLennan
- Jamal Mayers
- Craig Button
- Mark Roe
- Glenn Schiiler
