= Scott Morrison (journalist) =

Canadian sports journalist for Sportsnet (born 1958)

Scott Morrison (born October 7, 1958) is a Canadian sports journalist for Sportsnet. He worked for the Toronto Sun throughout the 1980s and 1990s until he joined Rogers Sportsnet in 2001 as managing editor of Hockey. He was let go from Sportsnet in July 2006. He authored numerous hockey books, including Hockey Night in Canada: By the Numbers, "Mats Sundin: Center of Attention" and Hockey Night in Canada: My Greatest Day. He also contributes to CBC Television, CBC Radio and CBC Newsworld and appears often on HNIC. He also provides information to AM640's Leafs Lunch and Bill Watters Show.

Morrison served as president of the Professional Hockey Writers' Association from 1987 to 1993. He was the recipient of the Hockey Hall of Fame's 2006 Elmer Ferguson Memorial Award.

On September 8, 2011, Sportsnet announced the return of Morrison to their network as "Executive Producer of Hockey". He also provides inside commentary on their Hockey Central panel.

In November 2022, Morrison was appointed to the selection committee for the Hockey Hall of Fame.
