= O-Dog =

O-Dog may refer to:

- A nickname for baseball player Owen Clift
- A fictional character in the movie Menace II Society
- O-Dog (The Wire) character in the series The Wire
- The nickname for former NHL player Jeff O'Neill
- The nickname for Owen De Giorgio
