= WTSN =

WTSN may refer to:

- WTSN (AM), a radio station (1270 AM) licensed to serve Dover, New Hampshire, United States
- WYYW-CD, a television station (channel 36) licensed to serve Evansville, Indiana, United States, which held the call signs WTSN-LP, WTSN-LD, or WTSN-CD from 2009 to 2012
- WTSN (TV channel), a now-defunct women's sports network in Canada
