= Andrew Krystal =

Canadian news reporter (died 2022)

- Born: Toronto, Ontario, Canada
- Died: May 22, 2022; Toronto, Ontario, Canada
- Education: University of Toronto
- Occupations: journalist, radio talk show host
- Employer(s): CityNews, Citytv
- Known for: work on CityNews and Canadian talk radio

Andrew Krystal (died May 22, 2022) was a Canadian news reporter who worked for CityNews on Citytv Toronto. He had previously been a radio talk show host, his most recent stints being on the Rogers Communications news talk network in The Maritimes, and sports talk radio station The Fan 590 in Toronto. Krystal was also a writer and occasional TV current affairs panelist.

== Career ==
Krystal was born in Toronto. Following his studies in English and international relations at the University of Toronto, Krystal began a career in radio syndication.

From 1986 to 1991 he worked with Sonic Workshop, owned by the late David Pritchard and Alan Lysaght, where he co-produced, wrote, voiced and sold the Entertainment Tonight-style series Entertainment Week and Entertainment Today, which aired in 60 Canadian markets. Following syndicated radio, he hosted and wrote independent TV series and travel guide programs.

He hosted The Andrew Krystal Show on Sunday nights on Toronto's CFRB, and also hosted talk radio programs on CFMJ (Talk 640/Mojo Radio) in Toronto, and on CKTB in St. Catharines, Ontario.

Krystal was banned from CTV Newsnet after telling Charles Adler in a political panel that he would have voted for Hitler if 'Hitler had been a conservative'.

=== As radio host on News 95.7 ===
Krystal began hosting Maritime Morning in October 2005. Originating from News 95.7 FM in Halifax, Nova Scotia, his program Maritime Morning was simulcast on co-owned stations News 91.9 in Moncton, New Brunswick and News 88.9 in Saint John, New Brunswick.

In the spring of 2010, the Bureau of Broadcast Measurement (BBM) reported that Maritime Morning with Andrew Krystal continued to be the highest rated program on News 95.7, with a 12.3 share among men 25-54, ranking second overall in the market.

In May 2010, Krystal won a Radio-Television News Directors Association of Canada Network Radio Award in the Atlantic Region for his broadcast editorial on the death of Michael Jackson.

On July 12, 2010 it was announced that Krystal would be leaving News 95.7 to join the Fan 590 in Toronto. His last appearance on Maritime Morning was on July 30, 2010.

=== As radio host on Fan 590 ===
On August 16, 2010, Krystal made his début on the Fan 590 on the 9AM-12PM timeslot. On September 21, 2010, Krystal made his debut as the host of the FAN 590's new morning show, Andrew Krystal in the Morning, on the 5:30AM-9AM timeslot with contributions by FAN 590 veteran Dan Dunleavy as its sports anchor.

On February 10, 2011, it was announced that Krystal was removed as the Fan 590's morning show host. Program director Don Kollins stated that he would remain with the station to "fill on-air shifts and work with me on new projects". Greg Brady served as the interim morning show host after Krystal's removal and was later named as the official morning show co-host along with Jim Lang on March 10, 2011.

On March 2, 2011, Krystal began hosting the 1PM-3PM timeslot, formerly hosted by Brady. On June 22, 2011, it was announced that Krystal was dismissed from the Fan 590. The station's program director, Don Kollins, stated that "Andrew is moving on to pursue other opportunities within Rogers and we wish him the very best."

As of early 2013, Krystal was no longer a television news reporter for CityNews in Toronto.

In November 2020, Krystal joined The Todd Veinotte Show, returning to News 95.7 in Halifax. Krystal died in Toronto on May 22, 2022.
