= Greg Brady (broadcaster) =

Canadian radio host (b.1971)

Greg Brady (born 1971) is a Canadian radio host and has hosted Toronto Today, the morning drive show on radio station 640 Toronto, since 2021. Previously, he was a sports radio host with Sportsnet 590 The FAN from 2010 to 2019.

In 2025, Brady took a leave of absence from 640 Toronto while he ran for a seat in the Canadian House of Commons as the Conservative Party of Canada candidate in Ajax.

From 2007 to 2017, Brady was a regular play by play announcer for NFL games carried on the BBC. He is also a regular pundit on the BBC Radio 5 Live show Fighting Talk, holding the record for most wins on the show, alternating that honour with John Rawling over the years, and has been a freelance sports correspondent filing reports from sporting events across North America for various BBC Radio services for over twenty years.

== Biography ==
Born and raised in London, Ontario, Brady attended the University of Western Ontario where he studied Political Science. After finishing his four years, he then completed Fanshawe College's journalism program

Brady began his career in broadcasting at CIXX-FM, the campus radio station of Fanshawe College. He moved on to CKLW in Windsor, Ontario, then joining WDFN in the late 1990s. He appeared in various broadcast roles at WDFN before he settled into co-hosting the Jamie and Brady show, with Jamie Samuelsen, from 2002 to 2007. Brady was fired along with co-host Samuelsen and update host Matt Shepard in November 2007. Both Samuelsen and Shepard were eventually rehired by WDFN, leaving Brady as the only member of that show not to return to Detroit radio. As a non-American citizen without employment, Brady was forced to move back to his native Canada where he co-hosted The Bill Watters Show on AM640 Toronto Radio. He has also presented Leafs Lunch on the same station.

Brady also has been an ice hockey play-by-play broadcaster for six seasons in the Ontario Hockey League. He spent five years as the first-ever broadcaster for the Saginaw Spirit, and spent the 2007–08 season broadcasting for the Windsor Spitfires.

Brady is father of two young boys and is married to fellow sports journalist and women's hockey pundit Rachel Brady. He resigned from AM640 on June 23, 2010, in order to pursue a more favourable schedule at the FAN 590 to accommodate his family life.

On August 16, 2010, Brady made his debut on the Fan 590 on the 12 noon – 3 pm timeslot with The Greg Brady Show. On September 13, 2010, Brady made his hosting debut for Hockey Central at Noon, co-hosted with Doug MacLean and Nick Kypreos, on the 12 noon – 1 pm timeslot, with The Greg Brady Show being reduced to the 1 pm – 3 pm timeslot.

On February 10, 2011, Brady was reassigned to the 5:30 am – 9 am morning show on an interim basis after Andrew Krystal was removed from that timeslot, while still maintaining his co-hosting job on the Hockey Central at Noon timeslot. On March 10, 2011, Brady was officially named the new morning show co-host on the Fan 590, alongside Jim Lang. Daren Millard was named as Brady's replacement as co-host on Hockey Central at Noon.

On February 8, 2017, it was announced that Brady would be part of Sportsnet 590 The FAN's new morning show: Sportsnet's Starting Lineup with Brady and Price. The new show, which launched on February 27, 2017 features Elliott Price, Brady and longtime Toronto Sportscaster Hugh Burrill.

In 2019, Brady left 590 for Global News Radio 640 in Toronto and became the morning drive host in 2021, after the station fired Mike Stafford. The program was renamed Toronto Today in September 2021.

On March 18, 2025, Brady announced he was leaving 640 to run for office as the Conservative candidate in Ajax for the 2025 Canadian federal election. At the time of the 2025 Canadian federal election, he lived in Ajax, Ontario.

== BBC and Fighting Talk ==
Brady also does freelance work for the BBC, including co-commentating for the Super Bowl, other NFL playoff games, and regular season games played in the UK, and reporting on Wimbledon. He has also been a regular pundit on the BBC Radio BBC Radio 5 Live show Fighting Talk since its debut in 2003; while he regularly contributes to the programme via ISDN from Toronto (earlier Detroit), Brady has been making appearances in studio since 2007, coinciding with the annual NFL International Series game at Wembley Stadium, London. He has been described by Gillian Reynolds, radio critic of The Daily Telegraph, as "fast on the factual draw and witty with it." Mark Pougatch, writing for The Times, has described his observations as "entertaining." BBC Five Live reaches around 6 million listeners.

The 2011–12 FT campaign was Brady's most successful to date, with six victories and five appearances in the Defend the Indefensible final, including a controversial double victory on the show's 8th birthday special on 8 October 2011 to put him ahead of rival John Rawling with 41 wins all-time. As of May 19, 2012, Brady has notched 44 wins during his FT career. Brady's record of six wins and as many appearances in Defend the Indefensible that season gave him his first-ever appearance in the FT Champion of Champions show, where he did not make the final, finishing in a third place tie with Dougie Anderson.

== Electoral record ==
2025 Canadian federal election: Ajax
Party	Candidate	Votes	%	±%	Expenditures
Liberal	Jennifer McKelvie	36,975	56.32	−0.51	
Conservative	Greg Brady	25,658	39.08	+12.48	
New Democratic	Kyle Forster	1,762	2.68	−11.36	
Centrist	Faisal Ali	643	0.98	N/A	
Green	Leigh Paulseth	612	0.93	−1.59	
Total valid votes/expense limit		65,650	99.27		
Total rejected ballots		484	0.73		
Turnout		66,134	67.89		
Eligible voters		97,407			
Liberal hold		Swing		−6.50	
Source: Elections Canada
Note: number of eligible voters does not include voting day registrations.
