= Jeff O'Neill =

Canadian ice hockey winger (born 1976)

- Born: February 23, 1976 (age 50) Richmond Hill, Ontario, Canada
- Height: 6 ft 1 in (185 cm)
- Weight: 195 lb (88 kg; 13 st 13 lb)
- Position: Right wing
- Shot: Right
- Played for: Hartford Whalers; Carolina Hurricanes; Toronto Maple Leafs
- NHL draft: 5th overall, 1994; Hartford Whalers
- Playing career: 1995–2007

Jeffrey O'Neill (born February 23, 1976) is a Canadian broadcaster and former professional ice hockey player in the National Hockey League (NHL). He played 12 seasons with the Hartford Whalers, Carolina Hurricanes and the Toronto Maple Leafs. He has earned accolades for his offensive contributions on the ice and represented Canada internationally in various tournaments.

== Playing career ==
=== Minor hockey ===
O'Neill grew up in the community of King City, north of Toronto, playing minor hockey for the King City Kings MHA as a youth. He grew up with two older brothers, Don and Ryan, both of whom played hockey. O'Neill played in the 1990 Quebec International Pee-Wee Hockey Tournament with the Richmond Hill-Vaughan Kings minor ice hockey team from the Ontario Minor Hockey Association. As a 14-year-old, he played at the Midget level with his brother Ryan — almost three years younger than some of his peers. At 15, O'Neill signed with the Thornhill Thunderbirds Jr. A club (OHA), whose coach Scott McLennan stated he had the skills to make it to the Ontario Hockey League. O’Neill's number was later retired by the Thunderbirds in 2004. He finished his rookie season second in the Metro Junior Hockey League in scoring.

O'Neill was the first overall selection of the Guelph Storm in the 1992 OHL Priority Selection, held at Maple Leaf Gardens in June 1992. He was named OHL Rookie of the Year that year after scoring 79 points in 65 games with the upstart Storm. His point total of 79 for a 16-year-old was the second highest total by a 16-year-old since Kirk Muller recorded 112 with the Guelph Platers in 1982–83. He also played in the American Hockey League for the Springfield Falcons. O'Neill spent three years in the OHL with the Storm before jumping to the NHL with the Hartford Whalers in 1995. Also in 1995 he represented Canada at the world junior hockey championships, winning a gold medal.

=== NHL ===
O'Neill was drafted in the first round, fifth overall by the Hartford Whalers (now Carolina Hurricanes) in the 1994 NHL entry draft. After joining the Whalers in 1995, he spent the next two seasons in Hartford before following the franchise to North Carolina in 1997. His point production increased after he arrived in Carolina, scoring at least 30 goals per season each year between 2000 and 2003, including a career high 41 goals during the 2000-2001 NHL season. The following year, the Hurricanes went on a Cinderella run to the Stanley Cup Final. During that playoff run, O'Neill led his team in playoff goals, including an overtime winner in game three of the Eastern Conference Finals against his hometown team, the Toronto Maple Leafs. O'Neill has since proclaimed that game in Toronto as the greatest game of his professional career. After eliminating the Maple Leafs, his team would advance to the final series against the Detroit Red Wings. They could not prevail however, as the Red Wings were heavily favoured with several future Hall of Famers on the roster and eliminated the Hurricanes in five games. The Hurricanes could not repeat their success the next season as they missed the playoffs, but O'Neill recorded his third 30-goal season and was selected to his first NHL All-Star Game

After his brother was killed in a car accident in Toronto in July 2005, O'Neill expressed a desire to play for the Maple Leafs in order to be closer to family. On July 30, 2005, Carolina GM Jim Rutherford traded O'Neill to the Toronto Maple Leafs for a conditional draft pick in the 2006 NHL entry draft.

Re-united with former Carolina Hurricanes coach Paul Maurice, O'Neill enjoyed a resurgence early in the 2006–2007 season playing on the top line with Mats Sundin and Alexander Steen, was briefly one of the top scorers. However, despite scoring 20 goals that season, O'Neill was benched for the remaining few games due to inconsistent performances. His poor performance combined with his fear of flying led him to consider retirement at the end of the season. After sitting out the following season, he was invited to the 2008-09 Training Camp by his former team, the Carolina Hurricanes. Following training camp, O'Neill played in two exhibition games with the Hurricanes, but opted to retire before the official start of the season.

== Broadcasting career ==
O'Neill is presently a sports broadcaster and hockey analyst with The Sports Network, appearing on Toronto Maple Leafs broadcasts and TSN Hockey programs. Nicknamed "O-Dog", he currently co-hosts OverDrive on TSN Radio 1050 with host Bryan Hayes and fellow co-host and former goaltender Jamie "Noodles" McLennan.

== Career statistics ==
=== Regular season and playoffs ===
			Regular season					Playoffs
Season	Team	League	GP	G	A	Pts	PIM	GP	G	A	Pts	PIM
1991–92	Thornhill Thunderbirds	MetJHL	43	27	53	80	48	—	—	—	—	—
1992–93	Guelph Storm	OHL	65	32	47	79	88	5	2	2	4	6
1993–94	Guelph Storm	OHL	66	45	81	126	95	9	2	11	13	31
1994–95	Guelph Storm	OHL	57	43	81	124	56	14	8	18	26	34
1995–96	Hartford Whalers	NHL	65	8	19	27	40	—	—	—	—	—
1996–97	Springfield Falcons	AHL	1	0	0	0	0	—	—	—	—	—
1996–97	Hartford Whalers	NHL	72	14	16	30	40	—	—	—	—	—
1997–98	Carolina Hurricanes	NHL	74	19	20	39	67	—	—	—	—	—
1998–99	Carolina Hurricanes	NHL	75	16	15	31	66	6	0	1	1	0
1999–2000	Carolina Hurricanes	NHL	80	25	38	63	72	—	—	—	—	—
2000–01	Carolina Hurricanes	NHL	82	41	26	67	106	6	1	2	3	10
2001–02	Carolina Hurricanes	NHL	76	31	33	64	63	22	8	5	13	27
2002–03	Carolina Hurricanes	NHL	82	30	31	61	38	—	—	—	—	—
2003–04	Carolina Hurricanes	NHL	67	14	20	34	60	—	—	—	—	—
2005–06	Toronto Maple Leafs	NHL	74	19	19	38	64	—	—	—	—	—
2006–07	Toronto Maple Leafs	NHL	74	20	22	42	54	—	—	—	—	—
NHL totals			821	237	259	496	670	34	9	8	17	37

=== International ===
Year	Team	Event	GP	G	A	Pts	PIM
1995	Canada	WJC	7	2	4	6	2

Preceded by Chris Pronger	Hartford Whalers first-round draft pick 1994	Succeeded by Jean-Sébastien Giguère
