= Andi Petrillo =

Canadian sports broadcaster (born 1980)

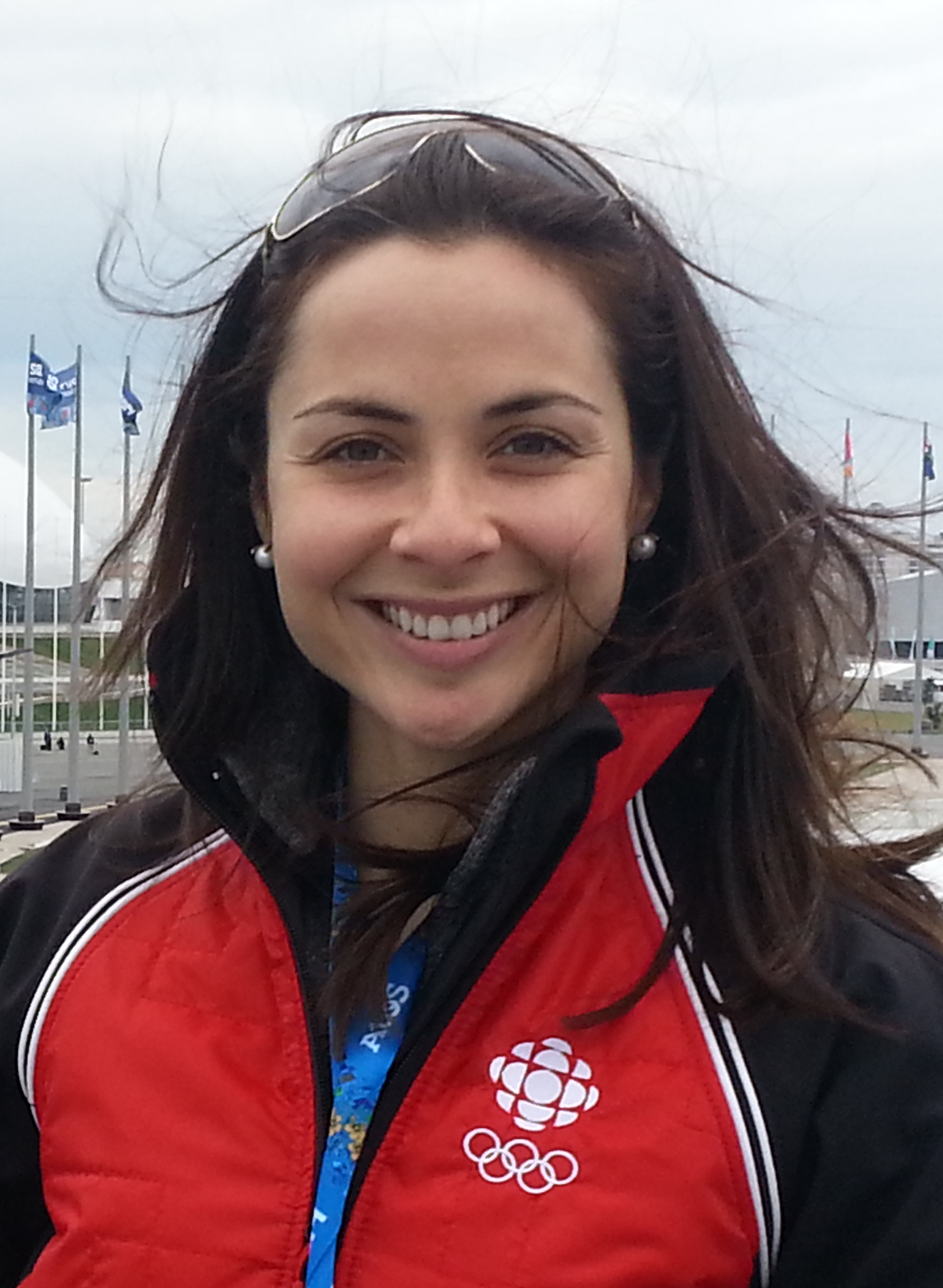
- Andi Petrillo at the 2014 Winter Olympics in Sochi, Russia
- Born: April 9, 1980 (age 46); Toronto, Ontario, Canada
- Education: York University
- Occupations: Sports broadcaster; sports radio host

Andria "Andi" Petrillo (born April 9, 1980) is a Canadian sports broadcaster. She became the first-ever female member to serve on a full-time basis with the Hockey Night in Canada studio team.

== Early life and education ==
Petrillo's parents immigrated to Canada from Italy. She graduated from York University with degrees in English and Mass Communications, as well as earned a diploma in Broadcast Journalism from Seneca College.

== Career ==
When she was 19, Petrillo began volunteering at her local television station, Rogers Cable York Region in Ontario, Canada. She worked behind the scenes on various shows from sports, news, and politics, to entertainment. Finally, Petrillo was given an on-air opportunity on the magazine show 'York Region Living,' where she hosted the restaurant segment. Petrillo has often joked about her first on-camera gig: "Figures, as someone of Italian heritage, my first opportunity would come as a restaurant reporter. I got paid in food!" Petrillo's role began to grow at the station and in 2004 the title of Sports Host and Producer became available. The station manager at the time, Lisa McClean Stellick, wanted Petrillo as her sports host, but was met with some push-back by some executives who were concerned about having two women at the desk for the nightly newscast, as the main news host was Jennifer Buchanan. McClean Stellick prevailed and in 2004 Petrillo became the sports host and producer for York Region. She covered various sports and found her niche in hockey where she hosted a weekly live Junior 'A' hockey broadcast.

In 2006, Petrillo joined Leafs TV (owned by Maple Leaf Sports and Entertainment (MLSE)) and served as a reporter for broadcasts of games featuring the National Hockey League's Toronto Maple Leafs and their American Hockey League affiliate, the Toronto Marlies. With ESPN, she had the opportunity to do some freelance work such as sideline reporting for the 2008 National Lacrosse League championship game. Petrillo's role expanded under MLSE, and she began working on their other television stations: NBA TV Canada and GOL TV Canada as host and reporter for the Toronto Raptors and Toronto FC games.

In 2010, Petrillo travelled to Haiti on behalf of MLSE to deliver supplies after the earthquake. She then went to Afghanistan, along with former NHL players and the Stanley Cup to help lift the morale of the soldiers.

Petrillo joined Hockey Night in Canada for the 2011-12 NHL season and hosted the iDesk portion of the broadcast, becoming the first female to serve on a full-time basis with the HNIC studio team. She anchored CBC's coverage of the 2014 Winter Olympics in Sochi Russia, and the 2014 FIFA World Cup. Petrillo then joined NHL Tonight, the flagship show on the NHL Network in Canada and the United States, for the 2014-15 NHL season.

On October 24, 2015, CBC Sports launched a new show, Road to the Olympic Games, which Petrillo co-hosts with veteran sportscaster Scott Russell.

On February 18, 2016, it was announced that Petrillo joined TSN as the new radio voice for Leafs Lunch on TSN 1050, finally becoming the first-ever woman in Canada to have her own daily sports talk radio show. On September 14, 2021, Petrillo announced that she was stepping down from the radio show.

She also joined the analysis team for OneSoccer in 2019.

Petrillo was a pre-game host for MLS Cup 2016.

She won the Canadian Screen Award for Best Sports Host at the 10th Canadian Screen Awards in 2022.

In April 2024, Canadian NHL broadcast rightsholder Rogers Communications announced that it had struck a deal to shift a portion of its rights – specifically the Monday night games played in Canada – from its own NHL on Sportsnet broadcast to Amazon Prime Video for the 2024–25 and 2025–26 regular seasons. In September, it was announced that Petrillo and Adnan Virk would co-host the pre-game, intermissions and post-game portions of Prime Monday Night Hockey, which launched with a game in Montreal on October 14, 2024.

== Personal life ==
Since 2012, Petrillo has been married to former Major League Soccer goalie Jon Conway.

== Awards and honours ==
- 2012 Woman of Influence Award (presented at the CIS Women's Basketball Final 8)
- 2016 Canadian Screen Award for Best Sports Host in a Sports Program or Series for her work during CBC Sports' coverage of the 2015 Pan American Games.
- 2022 Canadian Screen Award for Best Sports Host for her work on the 2020 Tokyo Olympics.
- 2022 George Gross -Don Goodwin Award. Outstanding Sports Broadcasting. First woman to be given this award
- 2023 Canadian Screen Award for Best Sports Host for her work on the 2023 Beijing Olympics.
