= Bill Watters =

Canadian sports media personality (1943–2026)

- Born: June 29, 1943; Orillia, Ontario, Canada
- Died: November 15, 2026 (aged 83); Orillia, Ontario, Canada
- Occupations: Sportscaster, player agent, general manager, CFL player
- Known for: Hockey Central cohost, Toronto Maple Leafs general manager

William Wayne Watters (June 29, 1943 – November 15, 2026) was a Canadian sports media personality and executive. He served as assistant general manager of the Toronto Maple Leafs in the 1990s.

== Early life and college career ==
William Wayne Watters was born in Orillia, Ontario, on June 29, 1943. Watters attended and graduated from Orillia District Collegiate & Vocational Institute.

Watters was a fullback and linebacker with the Toronto Varsity Blues football team from 1961 through 1964. He was a team co-captain and league all-star at linebacker in both 1963 and 1964. In his final season (1964), he received the Johnny Copp Trophy as the team's most valuable player. Watters also was a member of the Wrestling Blues for three seasons (1961–62, 62–63, 63–64) and practiced regularly with the Varsity Blues men's ice hockey team, although he saw limited action in league play. He earned a total of three first colours and five second colours, and served on the UTAA men's athletic directorate in 1963–64.

== Professional sports career ==
Watters was selected second overall by the Toronto Argonauts in the 1964 CFL draft, despite being offered to be drafted at the number one pick as he wanted to play closer to his family, but was cut from the team roster. Following graduation, he embarked on a career as a teacher, and as athletic director at North Toronto Collegiate Institute. then turned to professional sports as a broadcaster and player agent.

Watters was an assistant manager of the Canada men's national team, helping Hockey Canada executive Derek Holmes compile rosters for the 1977 and 1978 Ice Hockey World Championships. He was the assistant general manager of the Toronto Maple Leafs from 1991 to 2003. In the 2000s, his son, Brad Watters, became the Argonaut's team president.

== Sportscasting career ==
Watters co-hosted Hockey Central on Rogers Sportsnet, The Bill Watters Show on AM 640 Toronto Radio and has been a regular contributor on Q107's John Derringer morning show.

Watters co-hosted Prime Time Sports from 1989 to 2011, when his contract expired and left Rogers Sportsnet. The Bill Watters Show on AM 640 Toronto Radio was replaced by the drive-time show by Arlene Bynon in 2011. He co-hosted the bi-weekly live internet broadcast of Next Sport Star with Frank D'Angelo, Phil Esposito, and John Gallagher.

== Personal life and death ==
Watters died in Orillia, Ontario, on November 15, 2026, at age 83.
