= The Bill Watters Show =

The Bill Watters Show is a former sports talk radio program on CFMJ AM640 in Toronto, Ontario, Canada. Hosted by Bill Watters and Jim Ralph, it aired weekdays from 4:00pm to 7:00pm.

As of July 18, 2011 it is no longer listed as a regular program on AM 640, and has been replaced by other programming.

== Hosts ==
The program was hosted by Bill Watters and Jim Ralph. Watters is a former NHL agent, scout, and the former assistant General Manager of the Toronto Maple Leafs. He also appears on Hockey Central on Rogers Sportsnet as well as Leafs Lunch on CFMJ AM640. The program also featured hockey "insiders" Darren Dreger, Scott Morrison and Christine Simpson. From 2007 Greg Brady cohosted the program.

== Format ==
The Bill Watters Show focused heavily on hockey, specifically the Toronto Maple Leafs. The program was often called "The Show The Entire Hockey World Listens To". The show also covered other major sports, with a specific focus on Toronto's professional sports teams.
