= Sue Prestedge =

Canadian sports broadcaster

Sue Prestedge is a Canadian sports broadcaster who was one of Canada's first and most influential female sports journalists.

After working as a sports reporter and anchor for CHCH-TV and CBET-TV, Prestedge joined the national CBC Television in 1983, and was part of the network's team covering the 1984 Summer Olympics. In that role, she won ACTRA's Foster Hewitt Award for Excellence in Sports Broadcasting at the 14th ACTRA Awards in 1985, for her "Olympic Journey" series of profiles of Canadian Olympic athletes. She remained with the CBC until the mid-1990s, also covering Olympic games in 1988, 1992 and 1994. In 1986, she served as a substitute anchor for several weeks on the network's noon-hour news program Midday, when Valerie Pringle was away on maternity leave; she also served a stint as host of Ontario Morning, CBC Radio's local morning program for non-metropolitan markets in Southern Ontario, in the early 1990s.

Prestedge subsequently became director of the broadcast journalism program at Mohawk College in Hamilton, Ontario. In 2001, she was named senior vice president of WTSN, the world's first television channel devoted exclusively to women's sports. The channel ceased operations in 2003, and Prestedge rejoined the CBC in a management role; in this capacity, she sometimes served as anchor of the network's abbreviated newscasts during its 2005 labour dispute.

After leaving CBC she has been teaching at Mohawk College and as freelance broadcaster.
