= Leafs Lunch =

Former Canadian sportstalk show

- Genre: Sports talk
- Running time: 120 minutes (12:00 pm – 2:00 pm)
- Country of origin: Canada
- Home station: TSN 1050
- TV adaptations: TSN
- Starring: Julia Tocheri and Michael Distefano
- Original release: January 12, 2013 – June 13, 2023
- Website: https://tsn.ca/leafslunch/

Leafs Lunch was a sportstalk show on TSN 1050 and simulcasted on TSN4. At the time of its cancelation, the show was hosted by Julia Tocheri and Michael Distefano.

The show aired between 12:00 pm and 2:00 pm in the Toronto radio market and primarily focused on the Toronto Maple Leafs and also discussed topics related to the NHL.

== History ==
On January 12, 2013, Leafs Lunch with host Bryan Hayes and analyst Jamie McLennan officially launched, replacing previous shows focused on the Toronto Maple Leafs that had occupied TSN 1050's 12 pm to 2 pm timeslot. Hayes and McLennan were later joined by Jeff O'Neill in September.

On February 22, 2016, TSN 1050 introduced a revamped weekday lineup where Hayes, McLennan, and O'Neill left Leafs Lunch to became hosts of the new drive time program OverDrive and Andi Petrillo became the new host of Leafs Lunch. During Petrillo's tenure, regular co-hosts included Mike Johnson, Bob McKenzie, Dave Poulin, Gord Miller, and Mark Roe.

During the 2020 NHL off-season, Leafs Lunch temporarily rebranded as The Lunch with Andi Petrillo. The show aired from 12 pm to 1 pm and featured in-depth discussions on various sports topics.

On September 14, 2021, Petrillo announced that she was stepping down from Leafs Lunch. BarDown's Julia Tocheri and Michael DiStefano were later announced as the show's new hosts.

On June 14, 2023, Leafs Lunch was cancelled as part of a string of Bell Media cuts.

== See also ==
- OverDrive
