= Insight Sports =

Insight Sports Ltd.
- Company type: Private company
- Industry: Media, sports entertainment
- Headquarters: Toronto, Ontario, Canada
- Key people: John Brunton, Chairman and CEO
- Products: Television production
- Owner: Larry Tanenbaum and others
- Website: www.insightsports.com

Insight Sports Ltd. is a sports media and entertainment company based in Toronto, Ontario, Canada. The company is owned in part by Larry Tanenbaum, part owner of Maple Leaf Sports & Entertainment.

== Properties ==
Insight Sports operates Aquila Productions, a producer of sports television programming and distributor of sports and entertainment content across multiple platforms, including broadcast television, DVD, on-line, mobile, in-arena and video on-demand.

== Former assets ==
It was announced on January 23, 2009, that Maple Leaf Sports & Entertainment would acquire Insight Sports' interest in GolTV. The deal was approved by the CRTC on June 2, 2009.

In March 2009, Insight Sports announced a corporate restructuring wherein a team of managers led by the CEO will buy out a number of non-core assets including the Grand Slam of Curling, one of the most prestigious events on the World Curling Tour and the operation of Gretzky.com, the home page of Wayne Gretzky.

Insight Sports owned a minority share of NHL Network (owns 20.58%), a 24-hour hockey channel that shut down on September 1, 2015.

Insight Sports owned and operated World Fishing Network, a 24-hour fishing channel. The channel was subsequently sold to Keywest Marketing Ltd. in December 2016.

The company also operated GameTV on behalf of Kilmer Enterprises Inc., an investor in Insight Sports. GameTV was subsequently sold to Anthem Sports & Entertainment on August 2, 2016.
