= NHL Network (Canadian TV channel) =

Television channel devoted to professional hockey

- NHL Network logo
- Country: Canada
- Broadcast area: Nationwide
- Headquarters: Bell Media Agincourt, Scarborough, Ontario

Programming
- Picture format: 480i (SDTV)

Ownership
- Owner: NHL Network Inc. (National Hockey League consortium (58%); Edmonton Oilers – 23.2% Calgary Flames – 23.2% National Hockey League – 11.6% CTV Specialty Television (21.42%); Insight Sports (20.58%)
- Sister channels: NHL Network (United States)

History
- Launched: October 4, 2001
- Closed: September 1, 2015

NHL Network was a Canadian English language Category B specialty television channel broadcasting ice hockey programming. The channel's primary focus was on the National Hockey League (NHL), although it occasionally aired games from other leagues, such as minor league and international circuits, to fill its schedule.

The channel went on the air on October 4, 2001 and was owned by the NHL Network Inc., a venture consisting of the National Hockey League and two of its Canadian member franchises, CTV Specialty Television Inc. (a division of Bell Media and ESPN Inc.), and Insight Sports Ltd. The network's ownership structure, which gave the league only an 11.6% interest, was due in part to foreign ownership restrictions for Canadian broadcasters, which prevented the NHL (which, during the channel's existence, was owned by 30 member franchises, of which at least 23 were based in the United States) from exercising majority ownership directly.

The network's Canadian operations were managed by Bell-owned TSN, the now-former cable rightsholder of the NHL in Canada. Following Rogers Communications' acquisition of sole national media rights to the NHL in Canada, the Bell Media staff members who operated the network were laid off in July 2015, and NHL Network was shut down entirely on September 1, 2015.

The network's U.S. version was not affected by the shutdown; its operations were migrated to the Secaucus, New Jersey facilities of MLB Network as part of a wider partnership between the league and MLB Advanced Media.

== History ==
In November 2000, the Canadian Radio-television and Telecommunications Commission (CRTC) granted approval to former NHL executive Jim Gregory on behalf of a corporation to be incorporated (formed later as The NHL Network Inc.) to launch The Hockey Channel, described as "a national English-language Category 2 specialty television dedicated exclusively to all aspects of the game of hockey". The channel was launched on October 4, 2001 as NHL Network. Its success led the league to create a sister network in the United States in 2007 with many of the same programs.

Even as Rogers Media took over as national television rightsholder of the NHL in Canada beginning in the 2014–15 season, NHL Network remained operated from the facilities of TSN and featured some of its talent. League sources reported that due to the preparations needed for its first season as rightsholder, Rogers was unable to immediately take over the channel, but that Rogers would reconsider its role in NHL Network the following season. TSN could have, alternatively, remained the operating partner of NHL Network beyond the 2014–15 season.

On June 1, 2015, The Globe and Mail columnist David Shoalts reported that NHL Network in Canada would cease operations on September 1, 2015. Bell Media staff members who operated NHL Network on behalf of the partnership were laid off on July 1, 2015. In August 2015, the NHL announced that MLB Advanced Media would take over the U.S. NHL Network and operate it from the broadcast facilities of MLB Network in Secaucus, New Jersey, as well as the league's websites, and digital properties such as GameCenter Live (due to Rogers' rights deal, it will not handle distribution of the service in Canada). The CRTC formally revoked the NHL Network's license at its request on September 17, 2015.

In 2021, ESPN, the part owner of TSN, regained the rights to the NHL programming along with Turner Sports in the United States.

=== Logos ===
Silver logo used from 2005 - 2007. Original logo from 2001 - 2005 used original NHL logo colours; black and orange

Logo used from 2007 to 2009

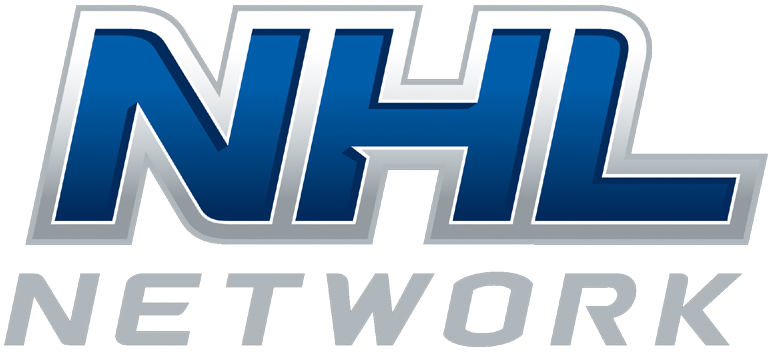
Logo used from 2009 to 2011

Logo used from 2011 to 2012

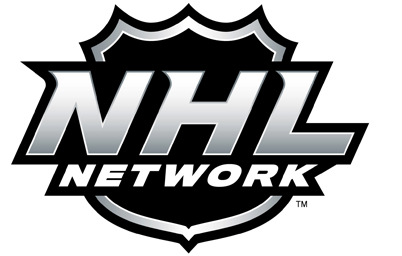
Final logo used from 2012 to 2015

== Programming ==
NHL Network featured a variety of programming related to ice hockey, primarily from the NHL, including live and tape-delayed games from present and past seasons, documentaries, news and analysis series.

=== Programs ===
- NHL Live - The network's premiere "pre-game" show. It airs Monday through Friday from 5:00pm–7:00pm Eastern Time. The show is broadcast from atop of the NHL Store in New York, NY, and is hosted by E.J. Hradek, Steve Mears, and Bill Pidto. The show provides viewers with a recap of the previous night's action and a preview of what's to come later on. During the show, the hosts will interview players, broadcasters, general managers, and coaches. They also read tweets on the air from Twitter followers. Before the show wraps up, the hosts will provide predictions on who they think will win games on each night with a segment called "The Shootout".
- NHL on the Fly - This is the network's signature primetime show providing viewers with live look-ins on the early-evening games, highlights, analysis, and news. The show begins nightly at 7:00pm Eastern Time and is predominantly hosted by Mark Roe and Andi Petrillo. It's occasionally hosted by E.J. Hradek as well. Analysis is provided by former NHL players and coaches including Kevin Weekes, Bob Errey, Dave Reid, Jamie McLennan, Craig Button, Jamal Mayers, Barry Melrose, and Kelly Chase. Inside information from around the league, such as rumours involving trades, hiring and firing of coaches is provided by Bob McKenzie and Darren Dreger from TSN.
- NHL Tonight - The network's late-night show provides viewers with live look-ins on the late-evening games, highlights, analysis, and news. The program was formerly known as 'NHL On The Fly: Final' until 2011. The show airs nightly beginning at 10:00pm Eastern Time. It's also predominantly hosted by Mark Roe and Andi Petrillo. It's occasionally hosted by E.J. Hradek as well. Analysis is provided by former NHL players and coaches including Kevin Weekes, Bob Errey, Dave Reid, Jamie McLennan, Craig Button, Jamal III Mayers, Barry Melrose, and Kelly Chase. Inside information from around the league, such as rumours involving trades, hiring and firing of coaches is provided by Bob McKenzie and Darren Dreger from TSN.
- Pioneers - A documentary series that gives viewers a closer, more in-depth look at hockey's biggest legends. The show includes interviews with the subject of their documentary and archival footage from their playing days.
- Frozen In Time - A series dedicated to showing the most memorable moments from players, coaches, teams, and special events in hockey history.
- Top 10 - A show that counts down the most memorable goals, saves, performances, and players.
- Classic Series - A 60-minute series showing the best playoff series in NHL history.
- Vintage Games - A whole NHL game from the past shown in its entirety.
- NHL All Access - A behind-the-scenes look at the NHL, featuring exclusive game coverage, interviews with players, and much more.
- NHL Cool Shots - A behind-the-scenes look at NHL players and their lives away from the rink.
- Encore Game - An encore presentation of a game from the night before. Airs daily beginning at 12:00pm Eastern Time.
- Raising the Cup - In the summer of 2010, the network televised 35 Cup-clinching games dating from 1975 to 2010.

==== Live games ====
Unlike its sister network in the United States, there are currently no live games on the NHL Network in Canada per the conditions of the NHL/Sportsnet deal.

==== Alternate programming ====
The following programs aired when the network was broadcasting a live game in the United States, but unable to do so in Canada.

- 24CH - A behind-the-scenes look at the Montreal Canadiens franchise.
- Caps Red Line - A behind-the-scenes look at the Washington Capitals franchise.
- Becoming Wild - A behind-the-scenes look at the Minnesota Wild franchise.
- Pittsburgh Penguins: In The Room - A behind-the-scenes look at the Pittsburgh Penguins franchise.
- Behind The B - A behind-the-scenes look at the Boston Bruins franchise.
- Oil Change - A behind-the-scenes look at the Edmonton Oilers franchise.

==== Special event coverage ====
- NHL Winter Classic - Complimentary coverage of the outdoor games that have been held on New Year's Day since 2008. The games have been held at the following locations since its inception:
  - 2008 - Ralph Wilson Stadium - Orchard Park, New York
  - 2009 - Wrigley Field - Chicago
  - 2010 - Fenway Park - Boston
  - 2011 - Heinz Field - Pittsburgh
  - 2012 - Citizens Bank Park - Philadelphia
  - 2013 - Cancelled due to lockout.
  - 2014 - Michigan Stadium - Ann Arbor, Michigan
  - 2015 - Nationals Park - Washington, D.C.
- NHL Heritage Classic - Complimentary coverage of the outdoor games that take place in Canada during selected seasons. The games have been held at the following locations since its inception:
  - 2003 - Commonwealth Stadium - Edmonton
  - 2011 - McMahon Stadium - Calgary
  - 2014 - BC Place - Vancouver

The next edition of the Heritage Classic was to take place in 2016 at Investors Group Field in Winnipeg, however, the Winnipeg Jets and the Winnipeg Blue Bombers couldn't reach an agreement on which date the game should be held, so it has been put on hold until the 2016-17 season.

- NHL All-Star Game - Complimentary coverage of the showcase featuring the league's best players taking part in an exhibition game that is held at the halfway point of the regular season, except when it's an Olympic year. The 60th National Hockey League All-Star Game took place on Sunday, January 25, 2015 at Nationwide Arena in Columbus, Ohio, with Team Toews defeating Team Foligno, 17-12.
- NHL entry draft - Complimentary coverage of the annual draft that takes place on the last weekend of June. The first round of the draft begins shortly after 7:00pm Eastern Time on Friday nights. Rounds 2 through 7 of the draft takes place on the Saturday beginning at 10:00am.

The 2015 NHL entry draft will be held on June 26 and 27 at the BB&T Center in Sunrise, Florida.

- NHL Free Agent Frenzy - Complimentary coverage of free agency that usually begins on July 1.

== See also ==
- NHL Network (U.S. TV network)
- TSN
