= MNSi Telecom =

Canadian Internet service provider

Managed Network Systems Inc.
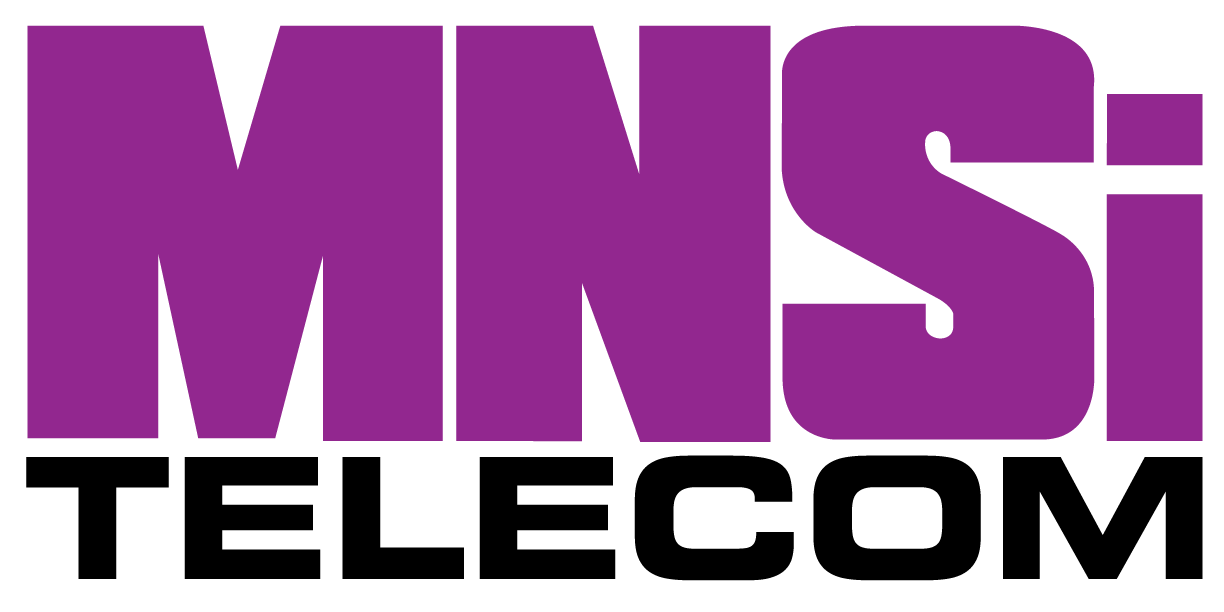
- Trade name: MNSi Telecom
- Type: Private
- Industry: Telecommunications
- Founded: Windsor, Ontario, Canada (September 1995)
- Headquarters: 3363 Tecumseh Road East; Windsor, Ontario; N8W 1H4
- Areas served: Southern Ontario
- Key people: Clayton Zekelman (President)
- Products: Digital subscriber line, Fibre-optic communication, Landline, Long-distance calling
- Owner: Clayton Zekelman
- Subsidiaries: Nexicom
- Website: www.mnsi.net

Managed Network Systems Inc. (doing business as MNSi Telecom) is a Canadian Internet service provider (ISP) and phone provider located in Windsor, Ontario. Opened in 1995, it is the oldest ISP in the Windsor-London area, having started in September of that year as a provider of Dial-up Internet access.

The company serves customers in the city, providing home and business phone, long distance, DSL Internet and fibre. MNSi also serves nearby areas of Southern Ontario, including Chatham, Leamington, LaSalle, Tecumseh, and Sarnia.

== History ==
In 2012 the company started planning and digging for fibre delivery to Windsor with a gradual roll-out of upgrades through to 2020. It will be an expected investment of more than $35 million. The service is available in Walkerville, Oldcastle and East Windsor.

The company is using its own fibre lines and the bandwidth is not purchased from a larger company. MNSi uses a local call centre.

In 2017, MNSi became a sister company with Central Ontario communications company Nexicom. In November, 2016, Nexicom received The Outstanding Business Achievement Award by The Kawartha Chamber of Commerce and Tourism.
