= ESPN Classic (Canada) =

Canadian sports TV channel (2001-2023)

- Country: Canada
- Broadcast area: National
- Headquarters: Toronto, Ontario

Programming
- Picture format: 480i (SDTV)

Ownership
- Owner: CTV Specialty Television; Bell Media (80%); ESPN Inc. (20%)
- Sister channels: TSN regional feeds RDS; RDS2; RDS Info

History
- Launched: September 7, 2001; 23 years ago
- Closed: October 31, 2023; 18 months ago

ESPN Classic was a Canadian English language discretionary sports specialty channel owned by CTV Specialty Television Inc., a joint venture between Bell Media (80%) and ESPN (20%). Intended as the Canadian equivalent of the American channel of the same name, it broadcast a range of archive sports coverage, talk shows, documentaries and films.

== History ==
ESPN Classic was licensed as Classic Sports in November 2000 by the Canadian Radio-television and Telecommunications Commission (CRTC), and was launched on September 7, 2001 as ESPN Classic Canada. A few years after its launch, "Canada" was dropped from its name and logo to "ESPN Classic". ESPN Classic was the only ESPN-branded channel broadcasting in Canada, although in addition to owning a stake in the Canadian version of ESPN Classic, ESPN is part-owner of TSN (which uses on-air branding similar to the flagship ESPN channel in the U.S.), along with Bell Media.

The European version of the channel closed in 2013 and the American version of the channel ceased operations at the end of 2021, leaving the Canadian iteration as the last active vestige of the ESPN Classic brand.

In September 2023, TV providers Hay Communications and MNSi Telecom announced that the channel would shut down at midnight Eastern Time on October 31, 2023. On September 25, the CRTC confirmed it had revoked the channel's licence at the owner's request.

== Programming ==
The channel's programming consisted primarily of archived sporting events associated with TSN-owned event rights, including hockey (particularly IIHF events), the CFL and NFL, basketball, and curling, as well as SportsCentre-branded highlights compilations and countdowns originating from the main TSN network.
