= Beer league =

Amateur adult sports leagues in North America

Beer leagues (North America) are amateur adult sports leagues of varying abilities, from ex-pro to complete amateur, with differing degrees of competitiveness. Beer league players go out of their way to declare their autonomy from their professional counterparts to allow freedom to reinvent the sport as a player-friendly cooperative entity. Each beer league determines the level and intensity of its play.

== Origin of the name ==
The name beer league may refer to the practice of pubs, taverns and bars providing financial sponsorships to support local teams. The bars often provide funding for a team's uniforms and equipment, and often a free drink for each player, in exchange for advertising the establishment on the uniform and usually naming rights to the team itself.

=== Alternative usage of the name ===
The phrase "beer league" can occasionally be used as a colloquialism for any sports league where alcohol is consumed, regardless of whether a bar or similar business is the sponsor. The consumption of alcohol is often encouraged during the contest, as the actual competition is secondary.

The term "beer league" has weaved its way into popular culture, appearing in movies and poems as a defining moment in masculinity.

== History ==
Beer leagues can be of virtually any sport but are amateur and recreational in nature.

=== Hockey ===
There are estimated to be approximately 174,000 adults that play beer league hockey in North America with a significant population of players over the age of fifty-five.

=== Baseball ===
"Beer league" or "recreational baseball" can be classified as the organization of baseball for men over 30. The American Association, also known as the "Beer and Whisky League", challenged the National League in 1882. Changes made in this beer league would impact the evolution of Major League Baseball. The beer league challenged the NL's hold on baseball by cutting admission in half, playing Sundays, selling liquor in its ballparks, and fielding exceptional players. The "beer league" in baseball found new life in 1986, appearing once again and evolving into a big league organization, with teams in 280 cities and 40,000 players nationwide.

== See also ==
- Sunday league (Europe and Australia)
