= Jim Lang (broadcaster) =

Canadian sportscaster

Jim Lang (born October 7, 1965, in Verdun, France) is a Canadian sportscaster, formerly with Rogers Sportsnet and Sportsnet Radio Fan 590 in Toronto. During his Sportsnet tenure, Lang co-hosted the weekend edition of Sportsnet Connected alongside Evanka Osmak.

In 2002, Lang served as the radio voice of the Toronto Argonauts of the Canadian Football League on Mojo Radio AM 640.

From March 10, 2011, to September 2013, Lang served as morning show co-host on Sportsnet Radio Fan 590 alongside Greg Brady.

In February 2014, Lang served as the host of his morning show, "The Jim Lang Show", on CFMS-FM alongside co-host Martha O'Neill.

Currently Jim Lang is the morning show host at 105.9 The Region. https://1059theregion.com
