= WTSN (TV channel) =

Defunct Canadian TV channel

- Country: Canada
- Broadcast area: Nationwide
- Headquarters: Toronto, Ontario, Canada

Ownership
- Owner: CTV Speciality Television Inc. (Bell Globemedia 80% ESPN Inc. 20%)

History
- Launched: September 7, 2001, 23 years ago
- Closed: September 30, 2003, 21 years ago

WTSN was a Canadian English language category 1 television channel owned by CTV Specialty Television Inc. (CTV Specialty), a joint venture between Bell Globemedia (80%) and ESPN (20%). The channel broadcast sports programming featuring female athletes.

Marketed as "the world's first 24-hour sports network dedicated to celebrating the achievements of women in sports," the channel was a spin-off of its sister channel, TSN, Canada's first and at the time, largest national sports channel.

== Programming ==
Programming on the network included a variety of programs ranging from live and tape-delayed sports events, documentaries, talk shows, news, and more.

Sports events coverage on the network included LPGA golf, WNBA basketball, women's tennis, WUSA soccer, women's curling, CWHL and WWHL ice hockey and coverage of various women's teams in Canadian Interuniversity Sport, among others.

The network also aired special coverage of Hayley Wickenheiser's debut in the Finnish men's hockey league.

== History ==
In November 2000, NetStar Communications Inc. (later renamed CTV Specialty Television Inc.) was granted approval for a television broadcasting licence by the Canadian Radio-television and Telecommunications Commission (CRTC) for a national English-language Category 1 specialty television service called Women's Sports Network, described as a service to be "dedicated entirely to sports that feature female athletes and participants, including coverage of professional and amateur sporting events, magazine shows, documentaries and instructional programs."

Prior to the channel's launch, NetStar announced that prominent sports broadcaster Sue Prestedge was named the senior vice-president of the channel.

The channel launched on September 7, 2001, as WTSN.

On August 29, 2003, CTV Specialty announced that they would be ceasing the network's operations on September 30, 2003, due to lack of expected growth, limited ad revenue, and the high cost of running a sports service.

TSN did not immediately surrender the channel's licence, and filed an intervention in January 2005 with the CRTC against a proposed licence amendment for Fox Sports World Canada that may have impacted on WTSN's mandate. Media analysts speculated that it may be possible that the channel might have relaunched at a later date if economic conditions were found to be more favourable. The licence was eventually revoked at the company's request on December 19, 2006.
