= Jamie McLennan =

Canadian professional ice hockey player

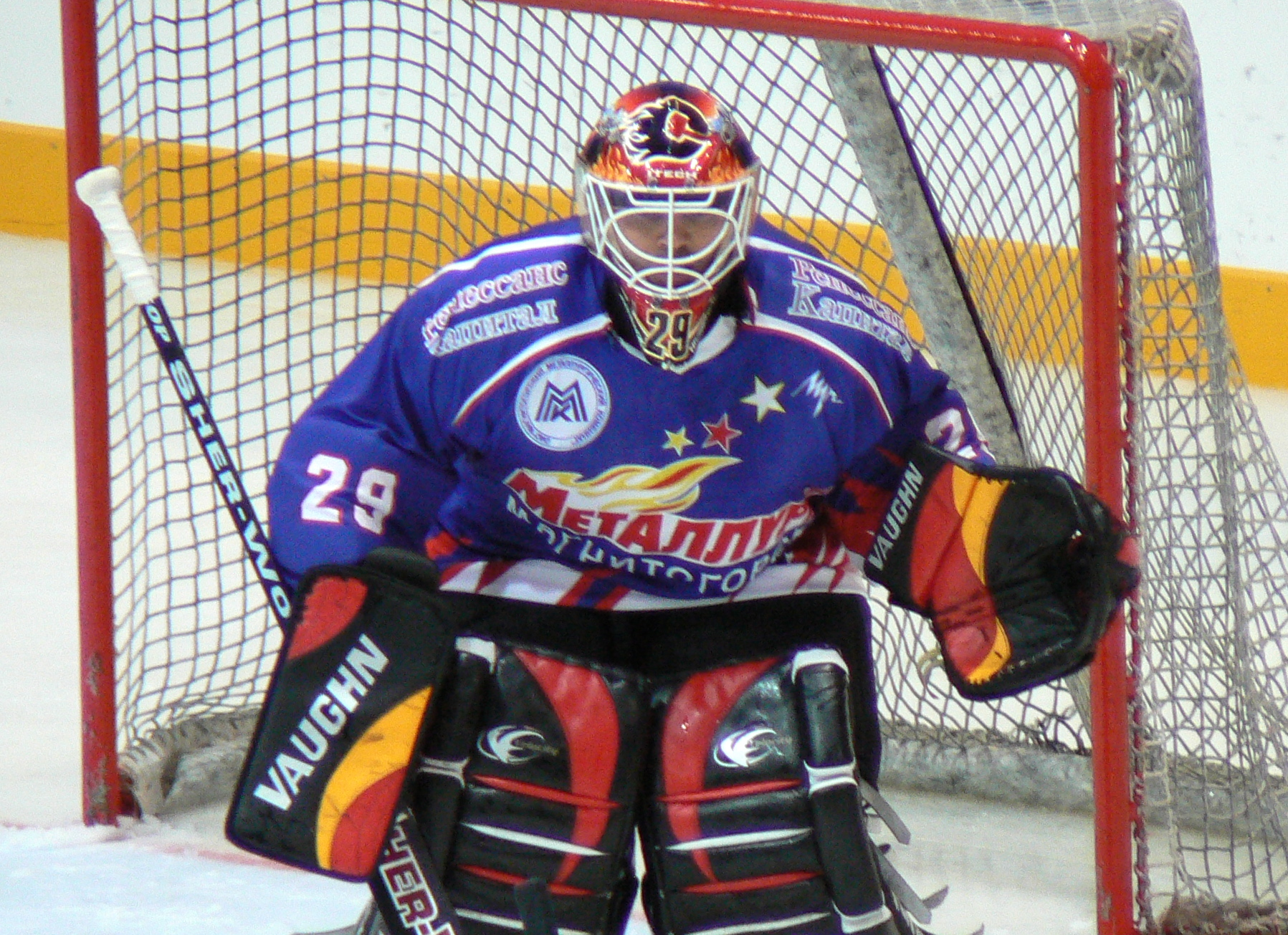
- McLennan with Metallurg Magnitogorsk in 2007
- Born: June 30, 1971 (age 55) Edmonton, Alberta, Canada
- Height: 6 ft 0 in (183 cm)
- Weight: 199 lb (90 kg; 14 st 3 lb)
- Position: Goalie
- Caught: Left
- Played for: New York Islanders; St. Louis Blues; Minnesota Wild; Calgary Flames; New York Rangers; Florida Panthers
- NHL draft: 48th overall, 1991; New York Islanders
- Playing career: 1991–2008

Jamie McLennan (born June 30, 1971) is a Canadian former professional ice hockey goaltender who is now an analyst for TSN.

A journeyman player in the National Hockey League (NHL), he played with the New York Islanders, St. Louis Blues, Minnesota Wild, Calgary Flames, New York Rangers and Florida Panthers.

== Playing career ==
Following his career with the Western Hockey League's Lethbridge Hurricanes, he was drafted in the third round, 48th overall by the New York Islanders in the 1991 NHL entry draft. After multiple years playing for minor league affiliates in the American, International and East Coast Hockey Leagues, McLennan was called up to the NHL and backed up veteran Ron Hextall in the 1993–94 season. He was shaky with the Islanders however, winning only 17 games with a .889 Save% over three seasons. Struggling to find confidence, he spent his last two seasons in the organization alternating between the NHL club and the minor leagues.

A few weeks after the 1995–96 NHL season had been completed, McLennan drove from Salt Lake City, Utah to Lethbridge, Alberta, on his way home to Edmonton. While visiting family in Lethbridge he fell ill. He went to a hospital on May 6, 1996, after feeling sick all evening, with immobility setting in. What was thought to be the flu turned out to be bacterial meningitis. After nearly dying that day, he spent the following week in intensive care. The Islanders declined to renew his contract at the conclusion of the season.

The St. Louis Blues signed him to a contract that summer and he spent the following season in the minors. He returned to the NHL as the Blues' backup goalie for the 1997–98 NHL season. That year he was awarded the Bill Masterton Memorial Trophy, awarded to the NHL player who best displays perseverance and dedication to hockey. In the 1999 off-season, the Blues acquired another backup goaltender, Roman Turek from the Dallas Stars, who easily won the Blues starting goaltender role. With the emergence of Turek and reduction of McLennan's games, the Blues won their first President's Trophy in franchise history. Turek was subsequently awarded as the sole winner of the William M. Jennings Trophy at season's end. That off-season, McLennan was left unprotected by the Blues in the 2000 NHL Expansion Draft and joined the Minnesota Wild franchise. In his only season playing for the Wild, he set a career high in games played with 38, but finished with 32 losses and only 5 wins. Ultimately, he returned to the minors the following season.

The Calgary Flames acquired him in a trade for a pick in the last round at the 2002 NHL entry draft, where he again played the role of NHL backup goalie, but only won two games that year. Despite his timid performances, he remained with the team, once again as Roman Turek's backup for the following season. When Turek became injured in the 2003–04 season, McLennan was thrust into the starting role. However the newly acquired Miikka Kiprusoff soon took over as starter, reversed the team's fortunes, and led the Flames to their first playoff berth in eight years. Turek returned later thus making McLennan expendable. With the Flames looking to add extra toughness into the lineup for the upcoming playoffs, they traded McLennan away in a package deal to the New York Rangers in March 2004.

Seeking an astute goaltender to partner with highly touted rookie Henrik Lundqvist, the Rangers signed free agent Kevin Weekes to replace McLennan. He then signed a two-year contract with the Florida Panthers, who were looking for a goalie that would only play sparingly with Roberto Luongo. After the Panthers declined their contract option for McLennan the next season, he was brought back to Calgary in 2006 to backup Miikka Kiprusoff.

On April 21, 2007, McLennan entered a first-round playoff game versus the Detroit Red Wings to provide relief to Kiprusoff. Immediately after entering the game, McLennan slashed Johan Franzén twice in the leg. Losing his cool, McLennan asininely slashed Franzén a third time and in the stomach after play was stopped, earning a game misconduct, and forcing Kiprusoff to return to the net. The NHL suspended McLennan for five games and fined coach Jim Playfair $25,000 and the team $100,000 for their actions late in the game. After retiring, the backup goalie admitted he slashed Franzen believing he could spark a line brawl. As he never played in the NHL again, he remained under suspension after his retirement.

That off-season, he signed with Metallurg Magnitogorsk of the Russian Super League but the team released him after 5 weeks due to poor performances and dislike from management and players.

On November 21, 2007, McLennan signed with the Nippon Paper Cranes of Asia League Ice Hockey. McLennan announced his retirement at the end of the 2007–08 season.

== Coaching ==
On July 10, 2008, he was added to the Calgary Flames front office staff as a professional scout. On June 23, 2009, McLennan moved into the coaching staff of the Flames after he was named as assistant to the head coach Brent Sutter.

== Broadcasting career ==
McLennan is a full-time NHL analyst on TSN and is a colour commentator for the Ottawa Senators. He is also a co-host on Overdrive on TSN 1050 and TSN2.

== Career statistics ==
=== Regular season and playoffs ===
			Regular season										Playoffs
Season	Team	League	GP	W	L	T	OTL	MIN	GA	SO	GAA	SV%	GP	W	L	MIN	GA	SO	GAA	SV%
1987–88	St. Albert Royals	AMHL	21	—	—	—	—	1224	80	—	3.92	—	—	—	—	—	—	—	—	—
1988–89	Spokane Chiefs	WHL	11	—	—	—	—	578	63	—	6.54	—	—	—	—	—	—	—	—	—
1988–89	Lethbridge Hurricanes	WHL	7	—	—	—	—	368	22	—	3.59	—	—	—	—	—	—	—	—	—
1989–90	Lethbridge Hurricanes	WHL	34	20	4	2	—	1690	110	1	3.91	—	13	6	5	677	44	0	3.90	—
1990–91	Lethbridge Hurricanes	WHL	56	32	18	4	—	3230	205	0	3.81	—	16	8	8	970	56	0	3.46	—
1991–92	Richmond Renegades	ECHL	32	16	12	2	—	1837	114	0	3.72	.891	—	—	—	—	—	—	—	—
1991–92	Capital District Islanders	AHL	18	4	10	2	—	952	60	1	3.78	.885	—	—	—	—	—	—	—	—
1992–93	Capital District Islanders	AHL	38	17	14	6	—	2171	117	1	3.23	.893	1	0	1	20	5	0	15.00	—
1993–94	New York Islanders	NHL	22	8	7	6	—	1237	61	0	2.84	.905	2	0	1	82	6	0	4.39	.887
1993–94	Salt Lake Golden Eagles	IHL	24	8	12	2	—	1320	80	0	3.64	.889	—	—	—	—	—	—	—	—
1994–95	New York Islanders	NHL	21	6	11	2	—	1185	67	0	3.39	.876	—	—	—	—	—	—	—	—
1994–95	Denver Grizzlies	IHL	4	3	0	1	—	239	12	0	3.00	.906	11	8	2	640	23	1	2.15	.929
1995–96	New York Islanders	NHL	13	3	9	1	—	636	39	0	3.68	.886	—	—	—	—	—	—	—	—
1995–96	Utah Grizzlies	IHL	14	9	2	2	—	728	29	0	2.39	.911	—	—	—	—	—	—	—	—
1995–96	Worcester IceCats	AHL	22	14	7	1	—	1216	57	0	2.81	.905	2	0	2	119	8	0	4.03	—
1996–97	Worcester IceCats	AHL	39	18	13	4	—	2152	100	2	2.79	.903	4	2	2	262	16	0	3.66	.894
1997–98	St. Louis Blues	NHL	30	16	8	2	—	1658	60	2	2.17	.903	1	0	0	14	1	0	4.29	.800
1998–99	St. Louis Blues	NHL	33	13	14	4	—	1763	70	3	2.38	.891	1	0	1	37	0	0	0.00	1.000
1999–00	St. Louis Blues	NHL	19	9	5	2	—	1009	33	2	1.95	.903	—	—	—	—	—	—	—	—
2000–01	Minnesota Wild	NHL	38	5	23	9	—	2230	98	2	2.64	.905	—	—	—	—	—	—	—	—
2001–02	Houston Aeros	AHL	51	25	18	4	—	2852	130	3	2.74	.905	14	8	6	880	31	2	2.11	.929
2002–03	Calgary Flames	NHL	22	2	11	4	—	1165	58	0	2.99	.892	—	—	—	—	—	—	—	—
2003–04	Calgary Flames	NHL	26	12	9	3	—	1446	53	4	2.20	.910	—	—	—	—	—	—	—	—
2003–04	New York Rangers	NHL	4	1	3	0	—	244	12	0	2.95	.876	—	—	—	—	—	—	—	—
2004–05	Guildford Flames	BNL	3	2	1	0	—	185	8	0	2.59	.941	7	4	3	385	13	0	2.02	.925
2005–06	Florida Panthers	NHL	17	2	4	—	2	678	34	0	3.01	.906	—	—	—	—	—	—	—	—
2006–07	Calgary Flames	NHL	9	3	5	—	1	533	32	0	3.60	.895	1	0	0	0	0	0	0.00	—
2007–08	Nippon Paper Cranes	ALH	14	8	4	0	—	791	33	0	2.50	.921	10	6	4	599	23	0	2.30	.924
NHL totals			254	80	109	33	3	13,834	617	13	2.68	.898	5	0	2	133	7	0	3.16	.892

== Awards and honours ==
Award	Year	Notes
WHL
East First All-Star Team	1990–91	
Del Wilson Trophy	1990–91	
NHL
Bill Masterton Memorial Trophy	1997–98	

Awards and achievements
Preceded by Tony Granato	Bill Masterton Trophy; 1998	Succeeded by John Cullen
