= The Sports Network =

Canadian English-language regional sports networks owned by Bell Media and ESPN

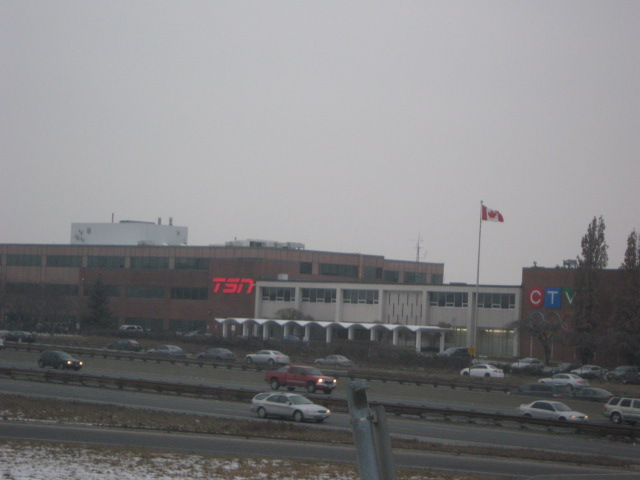
- TSN is headquartered at Bell Media Agincourt complex.
- Country: Canada
- Headquarters: Bell Media Agincourt, Scarborough, Toronto, Ontario

Programming
- Language: English
- Picture format: 1080i (HDTV) (HD feed downconverted to letterboxed 480i for SDTVs); 4K (UHDTV) (part-time, selected broadcasts)

Ownership
- Owner: The Sports Network Inc. (CTV Specialty Television)
- Sister channels: TSN1; TSN2; TSN3; TSN4; TSN5; TSN on CTV; RDS; RDS2; RDS Info

History
- Launched: September 1, 1984; 42 years ago

Links
- Website: www.tsn.ca

Availability

Streaming media
- TSN Direct: www.tsn.ca/subscribe (Canadian subscribers only)

The Sports Network (TSN) is a Canadian English language discretionary sports specialty channel owned by The Sports Network Inc., a subsidiary of CTV Specialty Television, which itself is a joint venture of Bell Media (80%) and ESPN, LLC (20%). TSN was established by the Labatt Brewing Company in 1984 as part of the first group of Canadian specialty cable channels. In 2013, TSN was the largest specialty channel in Canada in terms of gross revenue, with a total of CA$400.4 million in revenue.

TSN broadcasts primarily from studio facilities located at Bell Media Agincourt in the Scarborough neighbourhood of Toronto, Ontario. Stewart Johnston currently serves as president of TSN, a position he has held since 2010. TSN's networks focus on sports-related programming, including live and recorded event telecasts, sports talk shows, and other original programming.

== History ==
=== Early history ===
TSN's original logo, used from launch until 2001

Licensed by the Canadian Radio-television and Telecommunications Commission (CRTC) on April 2, 1984, as the Action Canada Sports Network, the channel was launched by the Labatt Brewing Company on September 1 of the same year as The Sports Network, or TSN. The network was founded under the leadership of Gordon Craig, a former employee of CBC Sports; alongside coverage of the then co-owned Toronto Blue Jays, TSN also reached a deal with ESPN (itself only 5 years old) shortly before launch to provide additional programs. Although reaching around 400,000 subscribers, TSN's early years were hindered by its initial status as a premium service, bundled in a high-cost package with movie channels such as First Choice and Superchannel, alongside competition with free-to-air sports broadcasts by CBC Television among others.

To improve the prominence of the network, TSN sought to obtain the national cable rights to the National Hockey League—rights that, according to the league, were not sold under the current arrangement with CBC. However, the task was complicated by claims by CBC that it owned the cable rights to the NHL, along with the involvement of competing beer company Molson in Canadian NHL rights at the time. With the help of a Molson employee who was a friend of Gordon, a deal was reached between TSN, Molson, and the NHL to allow the network to broadcast games on cable.

By December 1987, TSN had reached one million subscribers, but the network's staff sought wider distribution for the channel as part of basic cable service; the CRTC approved the network's request for permission to allow TSN to be carried as part of a basic cable lineup. Mike Day, producer of TSN's daily sports news program SportsDesk lamented about the shift to basic cable and the larger audience it would bring, commenting that "one night you're doing a news show that potentially has an audience of one million people, and the next day the potential is five million people." In 1990, TSN acquired rights to the IIHF World Junior Championship, otherwise known as the "World Juniors", which were previously broadcast by CBC. TSN's coverage, along with the recent "Punch-up in Piestany" incident and a strong performance by Canada at the tournament in the mid-1990s, helped to significantly heighten the profile of the tournament in the country (even more so than in other participating countries at the time), to the point that it is, alongside U.S. college football bowl games, regarded as a traditional sporting event of the holiday season in Canada.

Due to CRTC regulations on the foreign ownership of broadcasters, Labatt was forced to sell TSN and RDS upon its acquisition by Interbrew in 1995. Labatt's broadcasting assets were sold to a privately held consortium named NetStar Communications, the investors of which included a number of Canadian firms as well as ESPN Inc., which held an interest of about 30 percent. The same CRTC regulations prevented ESPN from establishing its own separate Canadian sports network outright, so acquiring a minority stake in TSN became ESPN's alternative plan to get into the Canadian market. The Sports Network launched its website TSN.ca on October 1, 1995.

In 1997, the CRTC began permitting TSN to offer an "alternate feed", which could be used to provide a regional opt-out of the main TSN service for programming that must be blacked out in the rest of the country. Alternate programming could make up a maximum of 10% of the TSN schedule—an average of 2.4 hours a day.

=== Acquisition by CTV, expansion ===
In 2000, after ESPN blocked two attempts by the Canadian partners to sell NetStar to Canwest, CTV Inc. acquired the Canadian partners' shares. CTV Inc. was acquired by Bell Canada and The Woodbridge Company (publisher of The Globe and Mail newspaper) as part of the joint venture Bell Globemedia in 2001. As a result of its purchase of TSN, CTV would be forced to sell its regional sports network CTV Sportsnet, eventually selling it to minority shareholder Rogers Media. Following the acquisition, TSN would move its operations to CTV's Agincourt complex in the Toronto district of Scarborough. This oddity would become an inside joke between personalities on both networks, who commonly referred to jumping between the two networks as "crossing the parking lot."

Following the sale, TSN began to closer align its on-air imaging with that of ESPN; the most prominent effect of these changes came with the introduction of a new logo similar to that of ESPN, and the re-branding of TSN's flagship sports news program SportsDesk as SportsCentre—a Canadian version (in both format and spelling) of ESPN's SportsCenter. The CRTC, however, objected to plans to rename TSN as "ESPN Canada", citing concerns that it would make it appear that ESPN had de facto majority control, or at the very least that TSN was ESPN's Canadian affiliate.

TSN also launched a number of digital specialty channels in 2001; including a local version of ESPN Classic, the NHL Network— a network devoted to ice hockey and the National Hockey League, and WTSN—a channel dedicated to women's sports. On August 15, 2003, TSN became one of the first two specialty television services in Canada (the other being fellow Bell property Discovery Channel, now USA Network) to be available in high definition. TSN's first live HD broadcast was of a Canadian Football League game between the Montreal Alouettes and Hamilton Tiger-Cats—it was to occur on the same day, but was delayed to August 16 due to a major electrical power failure that occurred the day prior.

Beginning in 2006, the CRTC officially allowed TSN to operate national secondary digital feeds with limited amounts of alternative programming. Following this development, TSN began to use such a feed to broadcast additional programming that could not be aired on TSN due to scheduling conflicts or other events. On August 29, 2008, the feed evolved into a new 24-hour channel, similar to ESPN2, known as TSN2. Upon its launch, TSN2 was legally considered a west coast timeshift feed of TSN, although soon after TSN2 was launched, the CRTC announced a proposal to remove genre exclusivity protections for "mainstream sports" and "national news" channels in the near future. As a byproduct of the decision, TSN would be allowed to use streamlined conditions of licence (legally referred to as a Category C license as of September 2011), which state that the service may offer "multiple feeds" consistent with their licensed programming format, without any restrictions on alternate programming. TSN was officially permitted to use these streamlined conditions of licence on February 1, 2010.

=== Acquisition by Bell, TSN Radio ===
On September 10, 2010, Bell Canada announced plans to re-acquire 100% of CTVglobemedia's broadcasting arm, including its majority control of TSN. Under the deal, Woodbridge Company Limited, Torstar, and the Ontario Teachers' Pension Plan would together receive $1.3 billion in either cash or equity in BCE, while BCE would also assume $1.7 billion in debt (BCE's existing equity interest is $200 million, for a total transaction value of $3.2 billion). Woodbridge has since simultaneously regained majority control of The Globe and Mail, with Bell retaining a 15% interest in December 2010. The deal closed on April 1, 2011, after the CRTC approved the sale on March 7, 2011 – the new company became known as Bell Media.

After a longstanding speculation about TSN's interest in launching its own TSN-branded radio network (similarly to its U.S. counterpart), TSN entered radio broadcasting with the launch of the first TSN Radio station, a relaunch of AM station CHUM in Toronto on April 13, 2011. Bell Media's Bell Media Radio division already operated several sports radio stations elsewhere in Canada (most of which were branded as The Team, a name introduced by previous owner CHUM Limited in its own failed attempt at establishing a national sports radio network), it was reported that Bell could theoretically relaunch these other stations under the TSN Radio brand in the future.

Also in 2011, TSN acquired broadcast rights to the new Winnipeg Jets. TSN would establish another part-time feed, TSN Jets, to broadcast the games. Additionally, co-owned CFRW would also gain radio rights to the new Jets. CFRW, along with Montreal station CKGM, also migrated to the TSN Radio brand on October 5, 2011. Additionally, Bell would also launch TSN Mobile TV, streaming versions of TSN and TSN2 offered through Bell Mobility's Mobile TV services.

On December 9, 2011, the Ontario Teachers' Pension Plan announced that it would sell its majority stake in Maple Leaf Sports & Entertainment to two major telecommunications companies; Bell Canada (TSN's main parent company) and Rogers Communications (owners of the competing Sportsnet chain of sports channels) with a 37.5% share each (Larry Tanenbaum increased his ownership to a quarter of the company as well), in a deal expected to be valued at around $1.32 billion in total. The deal was completed in summer 2012, following the approval of Canada's Competition Bureau, the Canadian Radio-television and Telecommunications Commission (with regards to MLSE's television channels), as well as the leagues for each of MLSE's main sports franchises. The deal was expected to have a major impact on future broadcast rights for MLSE's teams, including the Toronto Maple Leafs and Toronto Raptors, as their ownership of the teams will offer enhanced coverage for the team through new platforms such as mobile television.

In March 2014, TSN launched its TV Everywhere service TSN Go, allowing subscribers to TSN on participating service providers to stream TSN networks online or through a mobile app. On launch, TSN Go was available exclusively to Bell Satellite TV and Rogers Cable subscribers. It has since been expanded to other providers, such as Shaw.

=== Loss of national NHL rights, expansion into regional service ===
Following the announcement of Bell and Rogers' acquisition of MLSE, concerns were again raised by critics, speculating that Bell Media could attempt to acquire full rights to the NHL after CBC's current contract with the league expires following the 2013–14 season – using their ownership of the Toronto Maple Leafs, the NHL's highest valued franchise, as an impetus for such a coup. Concerns were also raised that such an arrangement could prevent wireless service providers other than Bell and Rogers from accessing its content; the CRTC had ruled in favour of Telus in a decision requiring Bell and other media companies to allow other competing wireless providers access to its content, and not exclusively tie it to their own service (as they had attempted to do with TSN Mobile TV). However, in November 2013, Rogers Communications announced that it had reached a 12-year deal to become the sole national television rightsholder of the NHL, beginning in the 2014–15 season.

When losing broadcasting rights to NHL games, TSN's strategy shifted to cover multiple other platforms including college football, March Madness, The Brier, and the US Open Tennis Championships. In January 2015, TSN had the second most watched month in its history at the time.

Critics considered Rogers' move to be a major blow against Bell and TSN, showing concerns for how the network could sustain itself without what is considered a key property in Canadian sports broadcasting. However, they also acknowledged the network's continuing rights to IIHF hockey tournaments (including the popular World Junior Hockey Championships), the Canadian Football League (who renewed their contract with TSN without allowing any outside bidders in 2019 and whose current contract lasts through 2025), and TSN's growing regional NHL rights portfolio, including the Maple Leafs—which would, beginning in the same season, air 26 games on TSN per season. In a series of Twitter posts by TSN personality Bob McKenzie, he explained that even with the loss of national NHL rights, TSN's goal was to remain "THE source for all things hockey" through its analysis programs and regional coverage, and that this was not the first time that TSN had lost its cable rights to the NHL (having lost them to CTV Sportsnet for a period upon its launch in 1998).

On May 6, 2014, TSN announced that it would launch three new channels—TSN3, TSN4, and TSN5, in September 2014 to coincide with the network's 30th anniversary. TSN president Stewart Johnston described the expansion as an "important evolution" for the network, as it would allow TSN to make more efficient use of its portfolio of sports properties: the network promoted that these new channels would allow TSN to broadcast a larger amount of ESPN content and live events, particularly including expanded coverage of major events (such as Grand Slam tennis, curling tournaments, and the NCAA basketball tournament) with multiple games occurring simultaneously. Although the expansion was discussed by TSN staff as early as 2012, critics considered the loss of NHL rights to Rogers (which had recently launched its seventh Sportsnet-branded television service with its acquisition of The Score, now Sportsnet 360) to be a catalyst for the move, as TSN attempts to defend its position as the largest specialty television service in Canada in terms of total revenue. The launch date of these new channels were pushed up to August 25, 2014, in order to allow multi-court coverage of the 2014 US Open tennis tournament, which began the same day. TSN also announced that it would use these new channels to house regional NHL games beginning in the 2014–15 season, featuring the Jets, Maple Leafs, and Ottawa Senators. At the same time, Dave Krikst created BarDown, a segment on TSN's YouTube page focused on attracting a younger audience. Made up of TSN producers Jesse Pollock, Corwin McCallum, Daniel Zakrzewski, Luca Celebre, and others, they post hockey-focused quizzes and beer league content.

On January 13, 2016, TSN announced that it would present its first telecast in 4K ultra high-definition—a Toronto Raptors basketball game—on January 20, 2016. It was followed by a slate of regional NHL games and other Raptors games in the format.

=== Transition to streaming ===
On June 7, 2018, TSN announced that it would offer its channels as part of an over-the-top subscription service branded as "TSN Direct". By late 2022, the "Direct" branding was dropped.

On January 12, 2023, TSN announced a separate direct-to-consumer service called "TSN+", which launched the same day with a limited-time free preview. The service, which was marketed as a complementary subscription comparable but not entirely equivalent to ESPN+, initially included Canadian rights to PGA Tour Live (acquired after Warner Bros. Discovery's GolfTV ceased operations), the NTT IndyCar Series (previously on Sportsnet), the relaunching XFL, as well as various other properties such as La Liga and AEW Rampage which were previously available as bonus streams to subscribers of the regular TSN linear TV service. TSN+ later added NFL RedZone, which had similarly been previously made available online to TSN subscribers, and priced the service at $8 per month, which was waived for subscribers to the full TSN over-the-top service.

In August 2026, partially mirroring a similar restructuring that had been made by ESPN the previous year, Bell Media quietly discontinued TSN+ and moved its content exclusively to the full TSN streaming package, which was rebranded as TSN Premium. A new TSN Standard streaming tier, with access only to TSN's linear channels, launched at the same time. These changes removed the ability for linear TV customers that have TSN as part of their package to upgrade to access the content previously included in TSN+, such as NFL RedZone, except by paying for TSN Premium at full price. However, in early September, parent company Bell notified its satellite and Fibe TV subscribers with TSN that they would henceforth get TSN Premium at no extra charge.

== Channels ==
Map of TSN's regional feeds

As is permitted for all Category C sports services, the TSN licence is permitted to have multiple channels, and currently encompasses all of the channels listed in the table below. However, unlike premium services like Crave, subscribers receiving one TSN channel are not necessarily automatically entitled to receive all additional channels, and in many cases they are (or previously were) only available by paying a separate charge to a service provider. For example, until 2013, Rogers Cable customers were required to subscribe to the HD Specialty Pack add-on in order to receive TSN HD (whereas most other HD simulcast channels were provided at no additional charge). On many providers including Rogers, TSN1, 3, 4 and 5 were included in a single package when those feeds launched, but TSN2 was provided only as part of a separate higher-tier package.

On May 6, 2014, TSN announced plans to launch three additional multiplex channels, for a total of five 24-hour national channels. The existing "TSN" service was replaced by four regionally-focused channels (referred to as "feeds")—TSN1, 3, 4, and 5—similar to the Sportsnet regional channels. All five channels are available nationally, but on most local providers, the channel location previously occupied by TSN's primary service was filled by the appropriate regional feed. The feeds carry a small amount of programming tailored towards their respective regions, particularly regional NHL coverage where applicable. At launch, the channels also aired simulcasts of lunch-hour shows from TSN Radio stations in their relevant region. While major sports telecasts are simulcast across TSN1, 3, 4, and 5 to ensure national coverage, alternative studio shows and live events can also be split across the channels. When TV listings and promotions make a reference to a program airing on "the TSN network" or simply "TSN" without disambiguation, it can normally be assumed that the program will be simulcast on TSN1, 3, 4 and 5.

Their launch date was originally announced as September 1, 2014, to coincide with the 30th anniversary of TSN's launch, but was moved up to August 25 in order to accommodate multiple-court coverage throughout the 2014 US Open. Prior to the launch of the additional feeds, Bell executives stated that the expanded five-channel service would be offered for the same rate as was charged at the time for TSN and TSN2 together. Notwithstanding this claim, some providers, including Shaw Cable, have elected to charge extra for some of the new feeds. Most major Canadian television providers carried the new channels upon their launch, including Bell, Cogeco, Eastlink, MTS, SaskTel, Shaw, Source Cable, Rogers, and Telus.

Videotron, a cable provider which primarily serves the province of Quebec, was a notable hold-out for the new feeds. On October 13, a Monday Night Football game was left unavailable in English (due to a rained out MLB playoff game, RDS2 was able to carry the game in French) to Videotron subscribers because TSN5—the only feed it carried—was airing a regional Ottawa Senators/Florida Panthers NHL game (a game which also attracted infamy for having the lowest attendance of any Panthers game in team history). On October 16, 2014, Videotron president Manon Brouillette responded to complaints by subscribers surrounding the incident, and confirmed that it had reached a deal in September to carry the new feeds; the addition of TSN1 to the lineup was accelerated to October 20, 2014, to ensure the availability of that week's Monday Night Football game, with the remainder added on October 29, 2014. On November 27, 2016, a one-time overflow channel was used to broadcast a regional Ottawa Senators game due to conflicts with the 104th Grey Cup (which featured the Ottawa RedBlacks, and was being simulcast across all TSN regional feeds).

The current TSN feeds, and any programming unique to each feed as per TSN's current TV schedules (subject to pre-emption by either ESPN or TSN due to live events), is shown below.

Channel	Launch date	Description and programming
TSN1	September 1, 1984; August 15, 2003 (HD)	Originally established as the primary, national TSN service since its launch, on August 25, 2014, this feed was renamed TSN1 and became the primary TSN feed for viewers in British Columbia, Alberta and Yukon. On August 15, 2003, TSN launched a high definition simulcast, branded as TSN HD, airing widescreen and high-definition feeds of programming when available. As virtually TSN's entire schedule is now broadcast in HD, the separate branding was dropped from on-air usage in 2013, and the HD feed is now letterboxed for standard definition viewers. All of the other TSN channels below have had HD simulcasts available since their respective launch dates.: Typically simulcasts ESPN (U.S.)'s talk programming on weekdays (these programs also frequently air on TSN3 and TSN5, but are more likely to be pre-empted on those channels for live events).
TSN2	August 29, 2008	Replaced a part-time "alternate feed" in operation since 1997. For the most part, it has served as an overflow channel for TSN's various sports rights, particularly when all four "regional" feeds are jointly carrying another major event.: Carries Toronto Raptors (and other NBA) regular-season coverage (sharing viewers with TSN4 & TSN5).; Carries regional Montreal Canadiens broadcasts (sharing viewers with TSN5).; Frequently airs ESPN/ESPN2 talk programming such as First Take on weekdays.; Simulcasts CHUM's Overdrive.
TSN3	August 25, 2014	The primary TSN feed for viewers in Manitoba, Saskatchewan, the Northwest Territories, Nunavut and northwestern Ontario.: Carries regional Winnipeg Jets broadcasts.
TSN4	August 25, 2014	The primary TSN feed for viewers in most of Ontario.: Carries regional Toronto Maple Leafs broadcasts.; Simulcasts CHUM's Leafs Lunch and Overdrive.
TSN5	August 25, 2014	The primary TSN feed for viewers in eastern Ontario, Quebec, and Atlantic Canada.: Carries regional Ottawa Senators broadcasts (sharing viewers with TSN2).
TSN 4K	January 20, 2016	A part-time feed for telecasts presented in 4K UHDTV, including selected Toronto Raptors, Toronto Maple Leafs, Ottawa Senators, and Canadian Football League games. Depending on provider, events may be available either on a dedicated "TSN 4K" channel, or on shared 4K events channels also carrying programs from competitors including Sportsnet.

The French-language Réseau des sports and related channels operate under a separate licence, as did TSN's other now-defunct sports networks WTSN and the Canadian versions of ESPN Classic and NHL Network.

Since January 2025, TSN also uses USA Network (formerly Discovery) as an additional overflow channel for some of its sports rights, with NASCAR Xfinity Series races and AEW Collision moving to the newly-relaunched channel.

=== Former channels ===
Channel	First air date	Last air date	Description and programming
Canadiens on TSN (TSN Habs)	October 25, 2010	April 10, 2014	A part-time feed which carried English-language regional broadcasts of Montreal Canadiens games from 2010 to 2014, in the eastern Canadian territory shared by Montreal and the Ottawa Senators. It was provided at no additional charge to customers in this region who subscribed to TSN through Bell Satellite TV, Bell Fibe TV, Bell Aliant FibreOP, and Shaw Direct. The rights expired before the 2014–15 season, and were acquired by Sportsnet East. TSN re-gained the Canadiens' rights in 2017–18, with the games moving to TSN2.
Jets on TSN (TSN Jets)	September 20, 2011	April 11, 2014	A premium channel which carried regional broadcasts of Winnipeg Jets games from 2011 to 2014, restricted to the Jets' NHL home territory of Manitoba, Saskatchewan, Nunavut, the Northwest Territories, and parts of northwestern Ontario. The channel cost $9.95 per month for the duration of the NHL season; a free preview was offered for the first few months of the Jets' inaugural season. Jets games moved to TSN3 for the 2014–15 season.

== Programming ==
Alongside its live sports broadcasts, TSN also airs a variety of sports highlight, talk, and documentary-styled shows. These include:

- Motoring (automotive) – An automotive newsmagazine program focusing on reviews and features about new automotive vehicles, including results of test drives
- SportsCentre – The flagship program, a daily sports news program delivering the latest sports news and highlights
- That's Hockey (hockey) – Daily hockey news program that presents the latest news in the sport

In connection with ESPN's minority ownership in TSN, the network has a long-term agreement with ESPN International for the Canadian rights to ESPN original and studio programs, including Pardon the Interruption, Around the Horn, Sunday NFL Countdown, NFL Live, Baseball Tonight, ESPN FC, and ESPN Films documentaries including the 30 for 30 series, among others, though it does not always air these programs simultaneously with their U.S. broadcasts.

In 2012, as part of promotion for the 100th Grey Cup, TSN produced its own anthology of documentary films, Engraved on a Nation, focusing on stories related to the Grey Cup and CFL. In 2019, TSN revived the series with a second season, chronicling other major figures in Canadian sports.

== Broadcast rights ==
=== Hockey ===
TSN is a major broadcaster of ice hockey in Canada; it holds rights to Hockey Canada tournaments, which includes the Allan Cup, Centennial Cup, Telus Cup and Esso Cup, as well as IIHF tournaments such as the Men's and Women's World Championships, the IIHF World Junior Championships (a tournament whose profile was notably raised by TSN), and the IIHF World U18 Championship. In 2020, TSN renewed its contract with Hockey Canada through the 2033–34 season.

On July 21, 2021, the Canadian Hockey League (CHL) announced that Bell Media would hold its national media rights package beginning in the 2021–22 season, with TSN holding rights to 30 regular-season games across the CHL's leagues per-season, as well as coverage of national events such as the Memorial Cup.

From 1987 to 1998, and again from 2002 to 2014, TSN held national cable rights to broadcast the NHL in Canada. Under its most recent contract, TSN aired regular season games on weeknights and Sundays, including exclusivity on Wednesday nights, as well as various Stanley Cup playoffs games, as the league's secondary rightsholder after CBC Sports. Its most recent contract expired at the end of the 2013–14 NHL season (following the 2014 NHL Draft); Rogers Communications (owners of Sportsnet) secured a 12-year contract for sole national rights beginning with the following season. TSN's then-parent company CTVglobemedia attempted to strike a similar exclusive deal in 2006 ($1.4 billion over ten years), but was not successful.

CTV acquired the rights to The Hockey Theme, which has been the theme song of Hockey Night in Canada for 40 years, after the CBC decided not to renew its rights to the theme song in June 2008 amid a legal dispute with its composer, Dolores Claman. A reorchestrated version of the tune has been used for hockey broadcasts on TSN and RDS since fall 2008.

TSN continues to hold four regional, English-language rights contracts:

- Winnipeg Jets: 60 games per season beginning in 2014–15; aired regionally on TSN3.
- Toronto Maple Leafs: 26 games per season beginning in 2014–15 (remaining regional games split with Sportsnet Ontario due to their then co-ownership of parent company Maple Leaf Sports & Entertainment); aired regionally on TSN4.
- Ottawa Senators: 60 games per season beginning in 2014–15 through to the 2025–26 season; aired regionally on TSN5.
- Montreal Canadiens: 50 games beginning in 2017–18 season, aired regionally on TSN2.

These games are subject to blackout outside the teams' designated home markets.

TSN has also occasionally broadcast the American Hockey League's Toronto Marlies games, which are simulcast from Leafs Nation Network; as with the Maple Leafs, the Marlies are owned by MLSE.

TSN was credited for breaking reports surrounding Hockey Canada's settlement of a 2018 sexual assault case.

=== Football ===
TSN has broadcast Canadian Football League games since 1987. Since the 2008 season, TSN has been the CFL's exclusive broadcaster, airing all of the league's games, including the season-ending Grey Cup. In November 2019, TSN and the CFL signed a six-year media rights extension, which was reported to expire in 2026.

The channel also previously held rights to the country's university football playoff tournaments, including the Hardy Trophy, Uteck Bowl, Mitchell Bowl and the Vanier Cup championship. The Hardy Cup coverage reverted to Shaw TV in 2014 while the Uteck, Mitchell and Vanier contests moved to Sportsnet, who acquired exclusive rights to CIS tournaments in May 2013.

=== Basketball ===
TSN splits rights to the National Basketball Association (NBA) and Toronto Raptors with Sportsnet, by virtue of the league's Canadian media rights being managed by Raptors owner MLSE.

TSN alternated broadcasting the 2019 NBA Finals with Sportsnet, which featured the Toronto Raptors winning their first-ever NBA championship. TSN aired the series-clinching Game 6, which saw an average of 7.7 million viewers as the most-watched NBA telecast in Canadian history.

=== Soccer ===
TSN acquired Canadian rights to Major League Soccer in 2011, airing 24 matches during the 2011 season that involved the league's Canadian clubs, Toronto FC and Vancouver Whitecaps FC. Its slate expanded to 30 games in 2012 with the debut of the Montreal Impact in the league. TSN's channels broadcast a package of other regular-season games, the MLS All-Star Game, MLS Cup Playoffs and the MLS Cup. In January 2014, TSN announced that it would take over broadcast rights to Whitecaps games beginning in the 2014 Major League Soccer season, under a separate deal. These rights were renewed in 2017 as TSN reached a 5-year extension to its Major League Soccer broadcasting rights. However, these exclusive rights were not renewed further (TSN Would air non-exclusive rights to select game's beginning in 2023), as all MLS programming moved to the new MLS Season Pass streaming service in 2023.

On October 27, 2011, Bell Media and TSN announced that they had secured broadcast rights for FIFA soccer tournaments from 2015 to 2022. The rights include the 2018 FIFA World Cup, 2022 FIFA World Cup, the 2015 FIFA Women's World Cup hosted by Canada and the 2019 FIFA Women's World Cup. The rights were further extended to include the 2026 FIFA World Cup, and 2023 FIFA Women's World Cup.

In 2021, TSN acquired the rights to La Liga, as part of a sub-licensing agreement with ESPN.

=== Other ===
TSN holds exclusive rights to Curling Canada's Season of Champions series through 2029, which includes Canada's women's and men's national championships, the Scotties Tournament of Hearts and Montana's Brier, along with the World Curling Championships. It also organizes the Pinty's All-Star Curling Skins Game, an annual skins curling tournament.

TSN has hosted much of Canada's supplementary Olympic coverage, being the first pay television channel in the world to ever broadcast the Olympics with the 1988 Winter Olympics in Calgary, and having been part of the CBC's coverage from 1998 to 2008. In 2010, TSN began to participate in CTV and Rogers' joint broadcast rights to the Olympic Games for 2010 and 2012. TSN continued to be a part of CBC's coverage of the 2014 Winter Olympics, but also in conjunction with Sportsnet (who participated in the CTV/Rogers coverage).

TSN has also historically been a broadcaster for Major League Baseball in Canada, as its former parent company, Labatt, was also the owner of the Toronto Blue Jays. Under Rogers ownership, TSN continued to sub-license a package 25 of Blue Jays games per-season, with the rest of the games televised by the co-owned Sportsnet, who is also the primary rightsholder of Major League Baseball in Canada. In 2010, TSN traded its Blue Jays games to Sportsnet for rights to ESPN Sunday Night Baseball. In 2014, TSN reached a deal directly with MLB International for Canadian rights to all of ESPN's MLB coverage, adding Monday Night Baseball and Wednesday Night Baseball beginning in the 2014 season.

=== International broadcast rights ===
TSN has broadcast the IIHF World Junior Championship coverage annually since 1992, produced by Paul Graham, after reaching a broadcast agreement with then Hockey Canada vice-president Bob Nicholson. TSN initially covered only the Team Canada games, then added all games in Team Canada's pool. TSN gradually expanded coverage to include all games of the tournament. As of the 2021 Championships, all pre-tournament and in-tournament games were broadcast.

Along with its coverage of Canadian events, TSN also airs coverage of international sporting events (primarily American), often simulcast from other broadcasters.

TSN also currently airs Formula One, NASCAR Cup Series, NASCAR Xfinity Series, and IndyCar Series events (as of the 2016 season, coverage of F1 events is supplied from Sky Sports).

As of the 2017 season, TSN serves as the exclusive cable rightsholder of the National Football League in Canada, alongside terrestrial rightsholder CTV, carrying all national game packages (including Sunday Night Football, Monday Night Football, and Thursday Night Football), as well as Sunday afternoon games. In 2022, the NFL renewed its contract with Bell under a multi-year deal, gaining exclusive Canadian rights to Thursday Night Football (as part of its move to Prime Video), and the expanded Monday Night Football schedule (including ESPN's NFL International Series game). TSN also carries ESPN's NFL studio programs, including NFL Live, Sunday NFL Countdown, and Monday Night Countdown, while NFL RedZone is carried on TSN's streaming platforms.

TSN is the exclusive rightsholder in Canada for all four tennis Grand Slams; in 2012, the channel signed multi-year extensions for the Australian Open, French Open and Wimbledon., followed by the US Open the following year. In 2016, TSN also re-gained rights to non-domestic ATP World Tour Masters 1000 and ATP World Tour 500 series events. In 2020, TSN also acquired rights to WTA Tour Premier 5 and Premier Mandatory events. Both exclude the National Bank Open due to exclusive media and sponsorship rights held by Rogers Media and Sportsnet, sold separately from other events.

TSN is also the rights holder for all four of golf's major championships – The Masters (first two rounds, and late-round coverage on CTV beginning 2016), US Open, British Open (late-round coverage in simulcast with NBC and CTV since 2016) and PGA Championship. In addition, it carries the Ryder Cup and Presidents Cup and simulcasts the RBC Canadian Open.

On December 22, 2014, it was also announced that Bell Media had acquired Canadian rights to UFC mixed martial arts, beginning in 2015. TSN's networks air all major events, including PPV preliminaries, domestic UFC Fight Night events, and The Ultimate Fighter. TSN also sub-licensed portions of its rights to fighting sports-oriented specialty channel Fight Network, which aired international Fight Night events and preliminaries for non-PPV events. The contract also includes French-language rights for RDS. The contract with Bell was renewed in December 2018; the Fight Network sub-licensing agreement was dropped, giving TSN rights to non-PPV preliminaries, and also adding Dana White's Tuesday Night Contender Series. The renewal coincided with the assumption of U.S. rights to the UFC by minority partner ESPN. TSN lost UFC rights to Sportsnet in 2024.

Through minority owner ESPN, TSN and RDS also hold exclusive Canadian broadcast rights to several other events which ESPN either owns outright, such as the X Games, or for which it owns the worldwide broadcast rights, such as the College Football Playoff, the NCAA Men's Division I Basketball Championship (sublicensed from ESPN International since 2011), the World Series of Poker, and its boxing coverage.

On December 19, 2014, Bell Media announced that it had acquired rights to the UEFA Champions League and Europa League for TSN and RDS beginning in 2015, with portions sub-licensed to beIN Sports. TSN lost Champions League and Europa League rights to DAZN after the 2017–18 season.

In the 2014–15 season, TSN began to broadcast a package of NCAA Division I college hockey games including regular season games (mainly simulcast from regional sports networks) and the NCAA tournament and Frozen Four (whose rights are owned by ESPN).

TSN airs WNBA games since 2019.

==== Professional wrestling ====
TSN previously aired WWE's flagship show, Raw, for over a decade. Though broadcast live, the show occasionally had been censored live for extremely violent scenes (such as when female wrestlers or characters were assaulted by male wrestlers) to meet Canadian broadcast standards, with repeat broadcasts often more heavily edited. The final episode of Raw on TSN aired on July 31, 2006, after which, rival network The Score (now known as Sportsnet 360) picked up the rights.

In 2019, TSN acquired broadcast rights to All Elite Wrestling's flagship show, Dynamite, marking the return of professional wrestling to the network. The show is broadcast in simulcast with TNT in the United States (subject to pre-emption in the event of conflicts with other programming). On August 9, 2021, PWInsider reported that TSN will stream AEW Rampage online in simulcast with the U.S. through its website and TSN Direct.
