= National Hockey League on television =

Overview of North American professional ice hockey on television

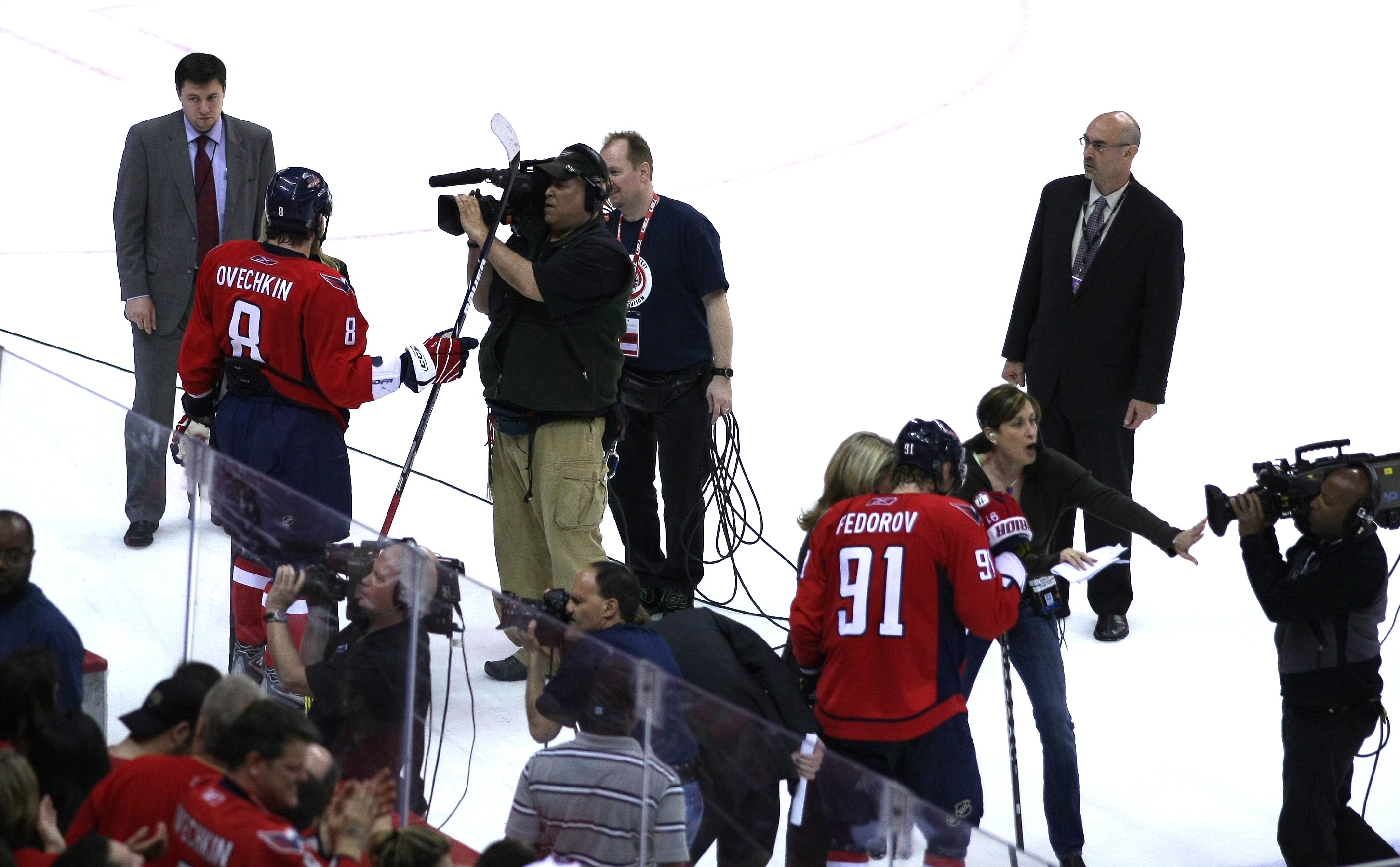
Members of the TV media interviewing Washington Capitals players Alexander Ovechkin (no. 8, left) and Sergei Fedorov (no. 91, right) on ice after a game, 2009

The National Hockey League (NHL) is shown on national television in both the United States and Canada. With 25 teams in the U.S. and 7 in Canada, the NHL is the only one of the four major professional sports leagues in the United States and Canada that maintains separate national broadcasters in each country, with each producing separate telecasts of a slate of regular season games, and all four rounds of the Stanley Cup playoffs including the Stanley Cup Final.

National broadcasting rights in Canada have included Hockey Night in Canada (HNIC), a long-standing Canadian tradition that debuted on CBC Television in 1952. Since the 2014–15 season, Rogers Sportsnet has held the Canadian national contract, and sub-licensed the national French-language rights to TVA Sports. Between 2014–15 and 2025–26, Sportsnet sub-licensed a slate of games to the CBC.

Historically, the NHL never held a long-term exclusive deal with an American national broadcast network prior to the 1994–95 NHL season. NBC and CBS held rights at various times from 1956 to 1981, but neither broadcast network carried anything close to a full schedule. The NHL on a national scale primarily was only available on cable television throughout most of the 1980s and early 1990s until Fox began televising a regular slate of games in 1995. Since then, exclusive American national coverage has been split between broadcast and cable. Since the 2021–22 season, the NHL has been shown on the ABC network; cable networks ESPN, TBS, and TNT; and internet streaming services ESPN+, Hulu, and HBO Max.

Individual teams in both countries have contracted to air their games on local channels, primarily on regional sports networks.

== Canada ==
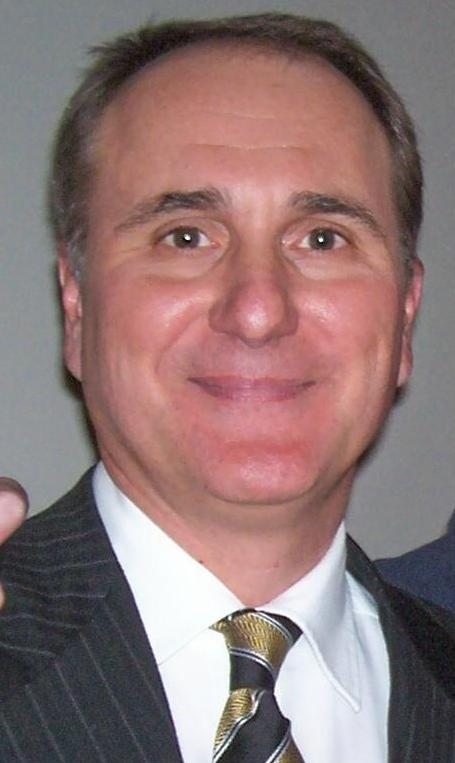
Chris Cuthbert, 2007. Cuthbert is currently the lead play-by-play announcer of the NHL on Sportsnet.

Broadcasting rights in Canada have historically included Hockey Night in Canada (HNIC), a Canadian tradition that made its debut on CBC Television in 1952, and prior to that starting on CBC Radio in the 1920s. The first NHL game to be broadcast on television occurred on October 11, 1952, a French-language CBC broadcast between the Montreal Canadiens and the Detroit Red Wings. CBC proceeded with its first English-language broadcast a month later on November 1, 1952, televising a game featuring the Toronto Maple Leafs and the Boston Bruins. Other previous Canadian broadcasters have included CTV, Global, TSN, Sportsnet; and French-language broadcasts on SRC, and RDS.

Rogers Communications signed a 12-year deal valued at C$5.2 billion to become the national television and digital rightsholder starting in the 2014–15 season. National English-language coverage of the NHL is carried primarily by Rogers' Sportsnet group of specialty channels. Sportsnet holds national windows on Monday (Hometown Hockey from 2014 to 2022; Monday Night Hockey from 2022 to 2024) and Wednesday nights (Scotiabank Wednesday Night Hockey from 2014 to 2026); for the 2024–25 and 2025–26 seasons, Monday Night Hockey was sublicensed to Amazon Prime Video as a streaming-exclusive package. Hockey Night in Canada was also maintained and expanded under the deal, airing games nationally on Saturday nights throughout the regular season across CBC, the Sportsnet networks, Rogers-owned television network Citytv, and FX Canada. While CBC maintained Rogers-produced NHL coverage during the regular season and playoffs through a time-brokerage agreement with the company, Rogers assumed editorial control and the ownership of any advertising revenue from the telecasts. Sportsnet's networks also aired occasional games involving all-American matchups.

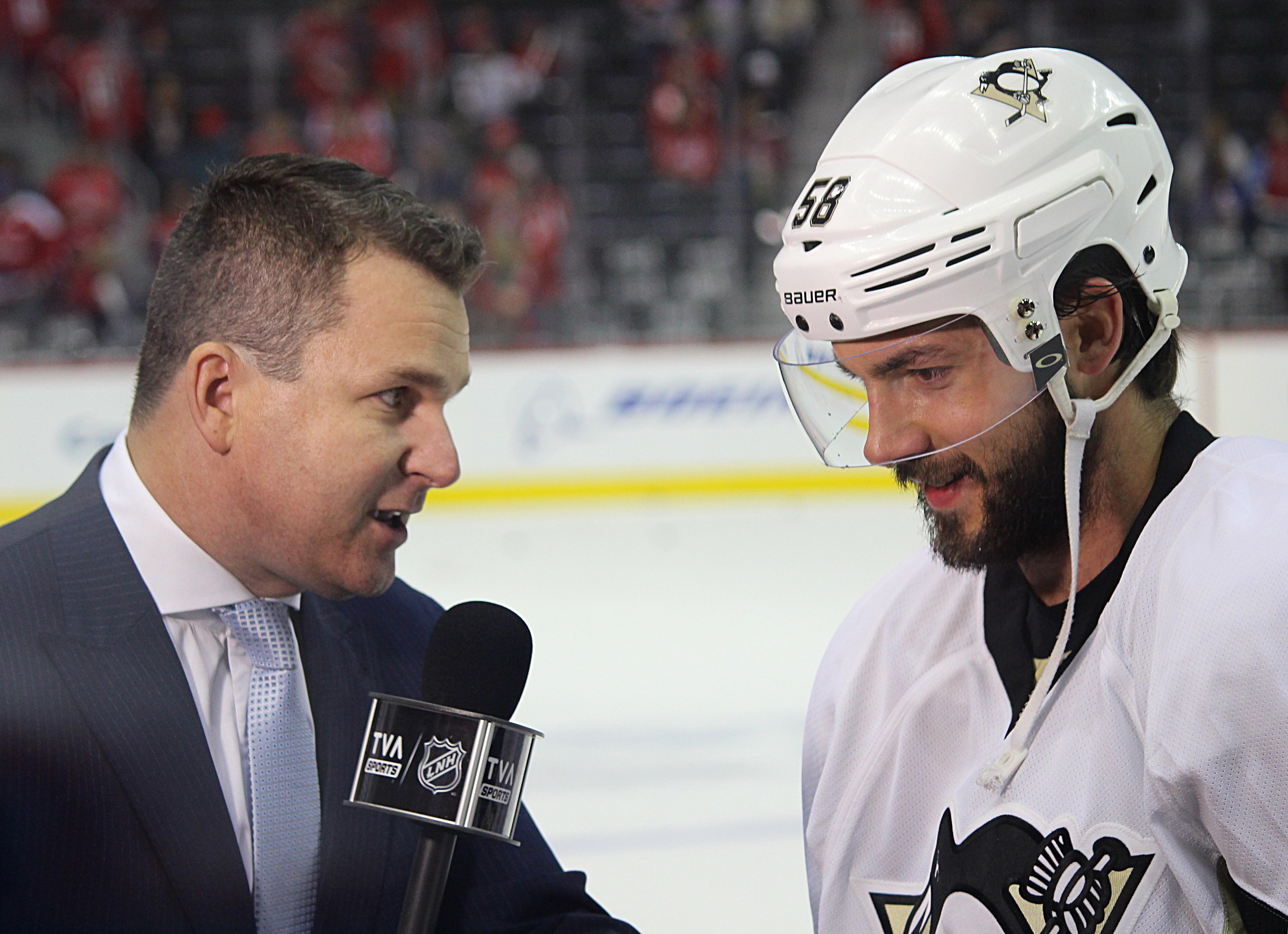
Renaud Lavoie of TVA Sports (left) interviewing Kris Letang of the Pittsburgh Penguins, 2016

Under another sub-licensing agreement with Rogers, Quebecor Media held national French-language television rights for the NHL, with all coverage airing on its specialty channel TVA Sports. TVA Sports' flagship broadcast on Saturday nights focus primarily on the Montreal Canadiens.

Sportsnet then signed a 12-year renewal to extend its agreement to 2037–38. Most of the existing broadcast arrangements from the previous contract will remain in effect, although Rogers stated that it would be able to flex more regional games from its networks to national telecasts. Rogers and Prime Video also signed a 12-year sublicensing deal which would see Prime air NHL games on Wednesday nights as well as exclusive coverage of two first round and one second round playoff series. Rogers and Quebecor Media also signed a 12-year sublicensing deal for TVA Sports to continue airing French-language broadcasts. However, CBC Television confirmed that it would no longer sublicense NHL coverage from Rogers, citing changes in its sports strategy following the 2026 Winter Olympics. The change resulted in the end of Hockey Night in Canada airing NHL games after 74 years. Sportsnet replaced Hockey Night in Canada with Saturday Night Hockey as its flagship national broadcast, while Monday Night Hockey became exclusive to its streaming platform Sportsnet+.

Games that are not broadcast as part of the national rights deal are broadcast by Sportsnet's regional feeds (though some regional broadcasts may air nationally due to Sportsnet's current status as the NHL's Canadian national TV partner), TSN's regional feeds, and RDS. Sportsnet and TSN split holds regional rights to the Toronto Maple Leafs; Sportsnet holds regional rights to the Calgary Flames, Edmonton Oilers, and Vancouver Canucks, while TSN holds rights to the Montreal Canadiens (English only), Ottawa Senators and Winnipeg Jets. RDS holds regional French-language rights to the Canadiens and Senators.

== United States ==
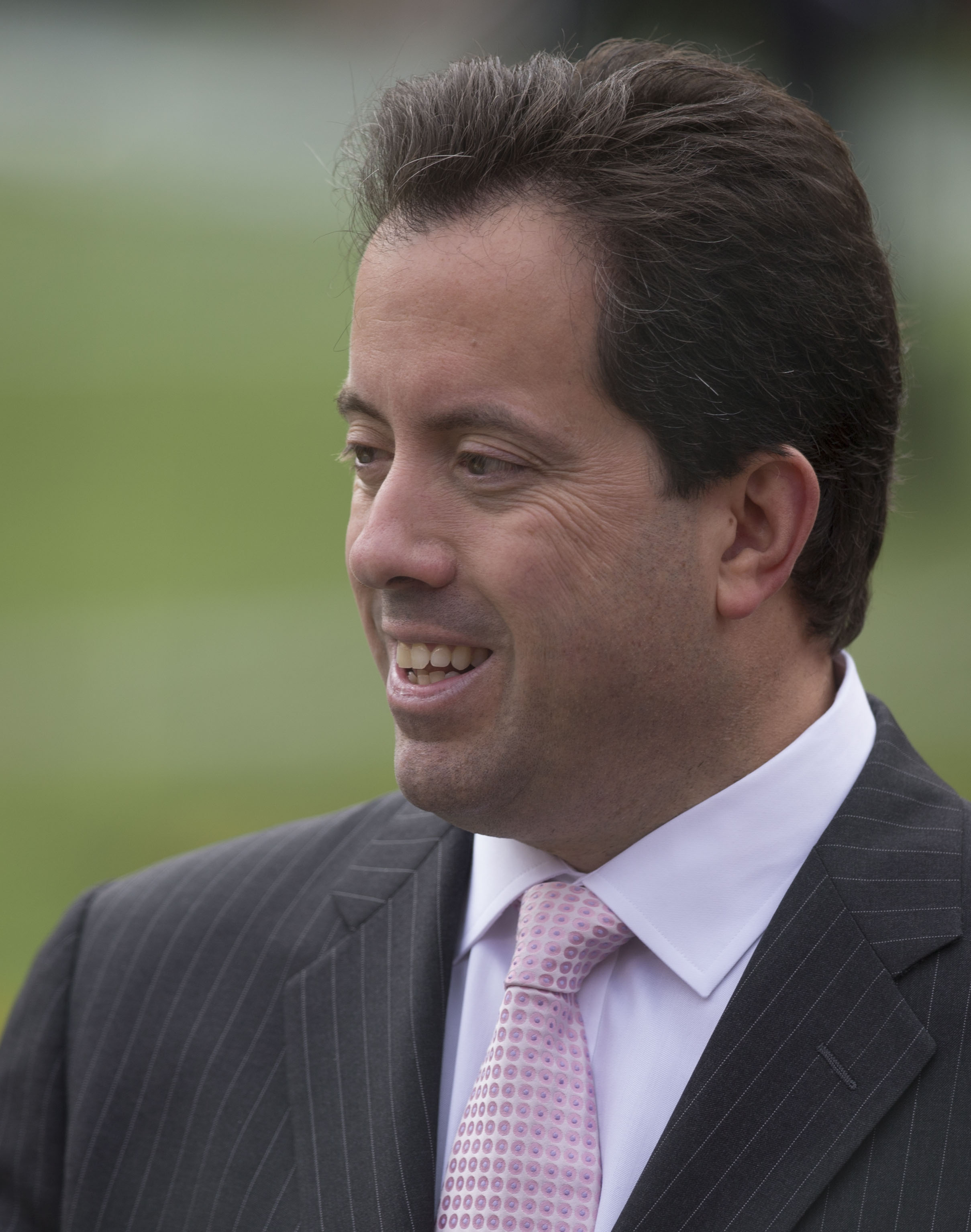
Kenny Albert, lead announcer of the NHL on TNT.

From the 1950s to the early 1990s, the league's American broadcast partners remained in flux, airing on various broadcast and cable networks such as CBS, NBC, ABC, the USA Network, SportsChannel America, and ESPN. Hockey broadcasting on a national scale was particularly spotty prior to 1981; NBC and CBS held rights at various times during that period, with each network carrying weekend-afternoon games during the second half of the regular season and the playoffs, along with some (but not all) of the Stanley Cup Final. The NHL primarily was then only available on cable television, with no exclusive coverage of games, until Fox began televising the NHL during the 1994–95 season. Since then, exclusive American national coverage has been split between broadcast and cable networks, first with Fox and ESPN from 1995 to 1999, then followed by ABC and ESPN from 1999 to 2004. After the 2004–05 NHL lockout, NBC and OLN (later renamed Versus, then NBCSN) televised the NHL until 2021.

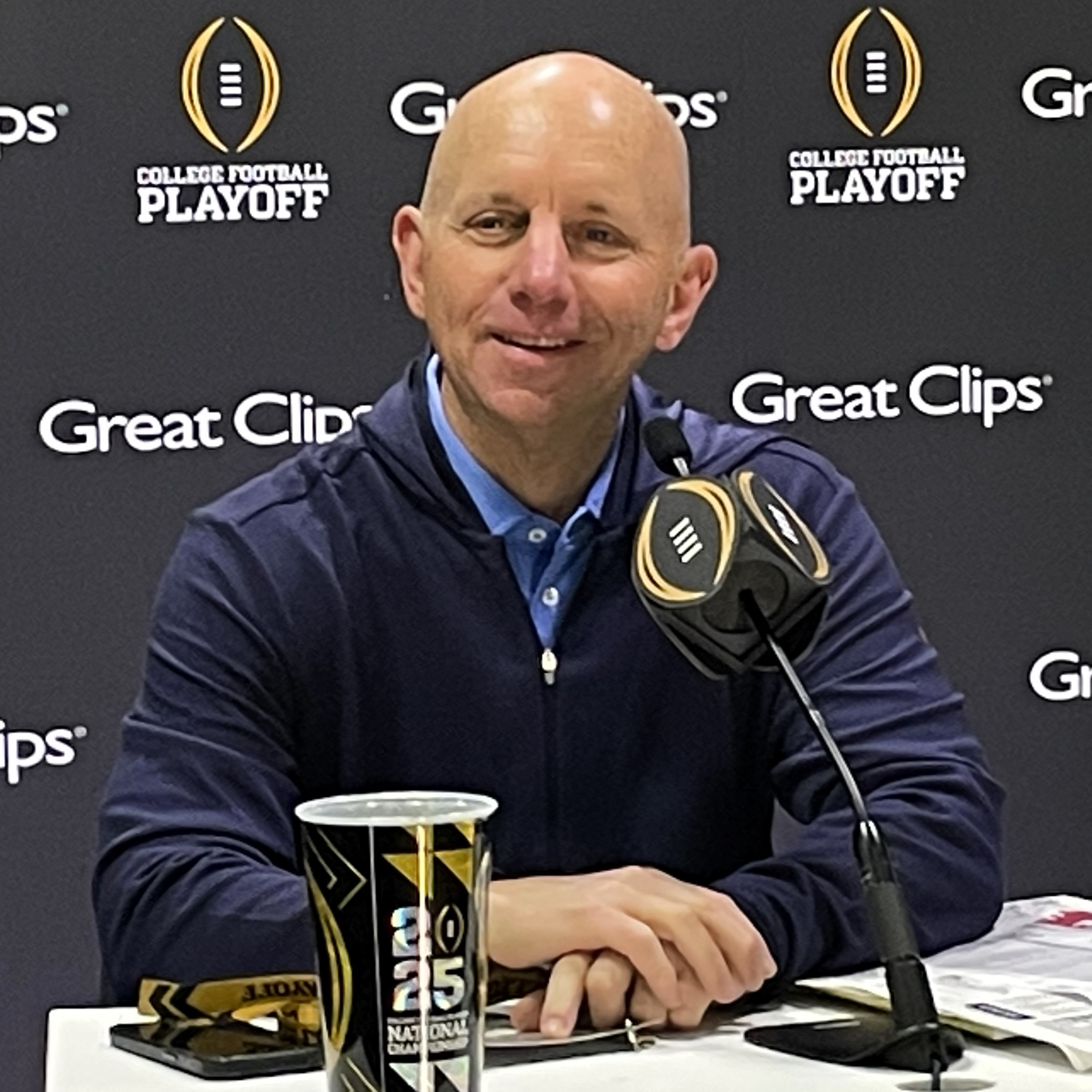
Sean McDonough, lead announcer of the NHL on ESPN.

The 2021–22 season marks the first year of seven-year agreements with ESPN and TNT/HBO Max. ESPN's deal includes at least 25 regular season games on ABC or ESPN, and up to 75 exclusive games streamed on ESPN+ and Hulu (as such, games streamed exclusively on ESPN+ are not available to co-exist on American regional sports networks). TNT Sports' coverage includes up to 72 regular season games on TNT or TBS (For the 2021–22 season, TNT aired 50 regular season games). The playoffs will be split between ESPN and TNT Sports, with ABC televising the Stanley Cup Final during even years and TNT televising the championship series during odd years.

As in Canada, games not broadcast nationally are aired regionally within a team's home market and are subject to blackout outside of them. These broadcasters include regional sports network chains such as FanDuel Sports Network, MSG Network, NBC Sports Regional Networks and Scripps Sports. Certain national telecasts, such as selected regular season games and first round playoff games, are non-exclusive, and may also air in tandem with telecasts of the game by local broadcasters. However, national telecasts of these games are blacked out in the participating teams' markets to protect the local broadcaster. In July 2026, the National Hockey League announced that its in-house production team would take on rights to the Carolina Hurricanes, Columbus Blue Jackets, Minnesota Wild, and St. Louis Blues beginning in the 2026–27 season, with the possibility of additional teams added later in the season.

Only a handful of regular season games, including the outdoor games, may be broadcast nationally in both countries. A Saturday night Bruins–Canadiens game, for example, would typically air on Hockey Night in Canada across that country but only regionally south of the border in the Boston area. Likewise, a Tuesday night Bruins–Canadiens game may air across the U.S. on ESPN or TNT but only regionally north of the border in the Montreal area.

== NHL Network ==
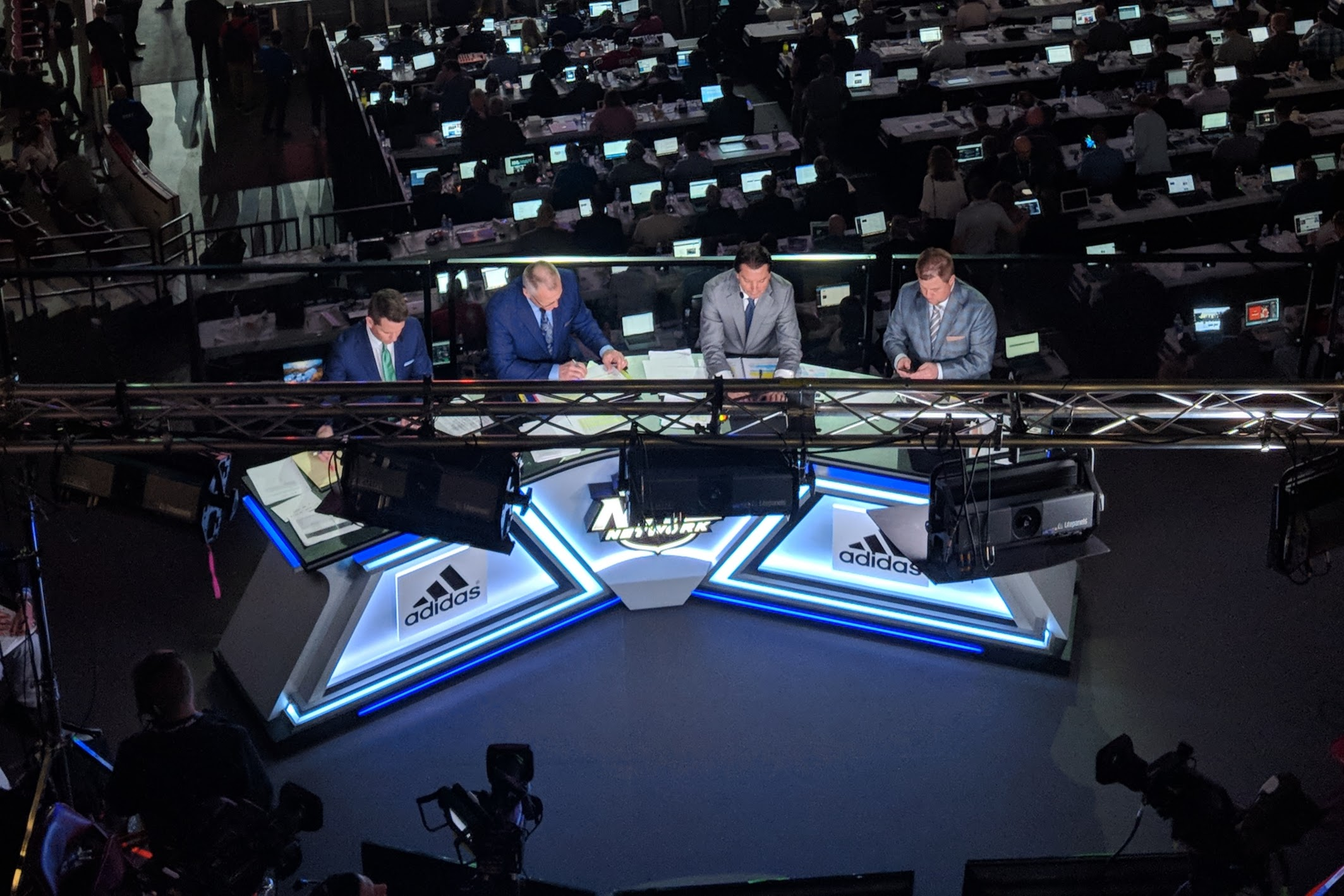
The NHL Network's television panel at the 2019 NHL entry draft at Rogers Arena in Vancouver

The league co-owns the NHL Network, a television specialty channel devoted to the NHL. Its signature show is NHL Tonight (formerly NHL on the Fly), which covers NHL news, highlights, interviews, and analysis. The NHL Network also airs live games but primarily simulcasts of one of the team's regional broadcasters.

There were originally two versions: one for Canadian viewers and a separate one for those in the United States. The Canadian version shut down on September 1, 2015, due to Rogers Communications' acquisition of sole national media rights to the NHL in Canada.

The American version of NHL Network was used as an overflow channel for select first round playoff games when NBC Sports held the American national TV contract from 2012 to 2021. In 2021, the network introduced its first original broadcasts, the NHL Network Showcase, airing on weekend afternoons and called by E. J. Hradek and Kevin Weekes.

== Out-of-market sports packages ==
NHL Centre Ice in Canada and NHL Center Ice in the United States are the league's subscription-based, out-of-market sports packages that offer access to out-of-market feeds of games through a cable or satellite television provider

The league initially launched NHL GameCenter Live in 2008 (later renamed NHL.tv in 2016), allowing the video streaming of out-of-market games over the internet, either through the NHL website, smartphones and tablets, digital media players, smart TVs, and video game consoles.

Per its exclusive national television and digital rights contract, Rogers Communications took over Canadian distribution and marketing of both the out-of-market TV and the internet services in Canada as of the 2014–15 season. A number of changes were made to the internet service, which was initially re-branded as Rogers NHL GameCentre Live. Canadian users access the service using a "MyRogers" login account instead of one directly on NHL.com. As part of the transition, Rogers also issued a free trial of the service, lasting through the start of 2015, to all Rogers cable and mobile internet subscribers. The services offers access to national games, along with in-market streaming of regional games. For the first season, it only offered in-market streaming for teams that Sportsnet held broadcast rights to (excluding the Ottawa Senators, Winnipeg Jets, and portions of the Toronto Maple Leafs' season, whose broadcast rights are held by TSN) For the 2015–16 season, a TV authentication system was used to allow in-market streaming for TSN-produced regional games as well. Rogers GameCentre Live also offers "GamePlus", a component featuring alternate camera angles, such as net cams, point-of-view cams, and sky cams. The sky cam are currently only available for Air Canada Centre games, but the remaining Canadian arenas will be equipped for it in the future. GamePlus features were only available to GameCentre Live subscribers who are subscribed to Rogers' cable, internet, or wireless services. For the 2018–19 season, Rogers discontinued the free trials, subscriptions, and additional GamePlus features to Rogers' cable, internet, and wireless service users, and required all users to pay the regular fees. For the 2019–20 season, the brand name for the service was shortened to NHL Live.

On August 4, 2015, the NHL announced a six-year deal with MLB Advanced Media (MLBAM), in which the company took over the operations of the NHL's digital properties, including websites, apps, and GameCenter Live, beginning in January 2016. MLBAM then distributed GameCenter Live under the new name NHL.tv in the U.S. and other international markets, except in Scandinavia (due to Viasat's right deal mentioned below), nor Canada (due to Rogers' rights deal mentioned above). The NHL also gained an equity stake of up to 10% in a spin-off of MLBAM's streaming media business, whose clients include Major League Baseball, WatchESPN, and HBO Now among others.

As part of ESPN's media deal that began in the 2021–22 season, the NHL's out-of-market internet services in the United States was incorporated into the ESPN+ streaming service. That same year, NHL Live in Canada became available at no extra cost to subscribers of Sportsnet Now Premium. Starting in the 2022–23 season, the separate NHL Live service was discontinued and all games were incorporated into Sportsnet Now Premium. Also starting in the 2022–23 season, out-of-market games on ESPN+, which did not carry any specific branding in the inaugural season, were branded as "NHL Power Play on ESPN+".

== International ==
Outside of Canada and the United States, NHL games are broadcast across France, the Middle East, and North Africa on beIN Sports, which takes feeds from ESPN/ABC, TNT, Rogers, and teams' regional broadcasts. In the UK Premier Sports has the rights to the NHL and show 15 games per week. Fox Sports in Australia, on Viasat Hockey in Sweden, Norway, Finland, and Denmark, in the Czech Republic and Slovakia on NovaSport or FandaTV and in Portugal on SportTV. In the Americas, NHL games are broadcast across Mexico, Central America and Dominican Republic on SKY México, South America and the Caribbean on DirecTV. Stanley Cup games can also be viewed in New Zealand on Sky Sport. In Brazil, the games are broadcast on ESPN International.

Until the 2025-2026 season the aforementioned NHL.tv was also available for people in most countries to watch games online; in July 2025, the over-the-top streaming service DAZN signed a multi-year deal to distribute NHL.tv, either a standalone subscription or an add-on to an existing DAZN package. On July 2026 DAZN subscribers received an email stating that "(...) due to changes in local broadcasting arrangements, NHL.TV will no longer be available on DAZN from September 1, 2026". Since most Countries in Europe are not covered by any TV broadcasts of the NHL (also due to the incompatible time zones), the termination of the 1-year long "multi-year" deal between DAZN and NHL.tv resulted in millions of European users having no further opportunities at all to continue watching the NHL legally. Note that even when the deal was still in place, blackout restrictions might apply if a game was being televised in the user's country. For example, in the United Kingdom, NHL.tv was not allowed to show live games broadcast on Premier Sports. Viewers in selected international markets where ESPN also holds the streaming rights must instead access games on the ESPN platform used in that particular country: ESPNPlayer, ESPN Play, the ESPN App, or Star+; those in Denmark, Estonia, Finland, Iceland, Latvia, Lithuania, Poland, Norway, and Sweden must use Viaplay.

== Comparisons with TV coverage of the other major leagues in the U.S. ==
With 25 teams in the U.S. and 7 in Canada, the NHL is the only one of the four major professional sports leagues in the United States that has a national Canadian broadcaster regularly produce separate telecasts of a slate of regular season and playoff games. If a game is televised nationally in both countries, then the separate Canadian and American feeds of the same game may be broadcast on two networks simultaneously in those areas in Canada that can receive U.S. stations and those regions in the U.S. that can receive Canadian stations.

This is most prominent during each league's respective championship series or game, where the American broadcaster's feed of the National Football League's Super Bowl, Major League Baseball's World Series and the National Basketball Association Finals is usually simulcast by a Canadian broadcaster (with simultaneous substitution of the commercials). With the prominence of Hockey Night in Canada since the 1950s, and with Canadian teams like the Edmonton Oilers and the Montreal Canadiens making multiple championship runs during the 1970s and 1980s, the Stanley Cup Final has regularly been produced and aired on broadcast television in Canada for decades. Meanwhile, American national coverage of the NHL evolved much slower than those of the other three leagues, and long-term coverage of the Stanley Cup Final remains on American cable television in some form with TNT Sports agreeing to air the series on TNT in 2023, 2025, and 2027.

With the NBA set to make the first round of the NBA playoffs exclusive to its national television partners effective the 2025–26 season, MLB having national TV exclusivity for the entire MLB postseason since 1984, and the NFL's television coverage being entirely exclusive to national outlets aside from preseason exhibition games, the NHL is now the only North American professional sports league whose preliminary rounds of the playoffs are still televised on regional sports networks. This, however, only applies to playoff games involving teams from the United States, as Canadian TV coverage of the Stanley Cup playoffs have long been exclusive to national networks such as CBC, CTV, TSN and Sportsnet.

== Primary regional broadcasters ==
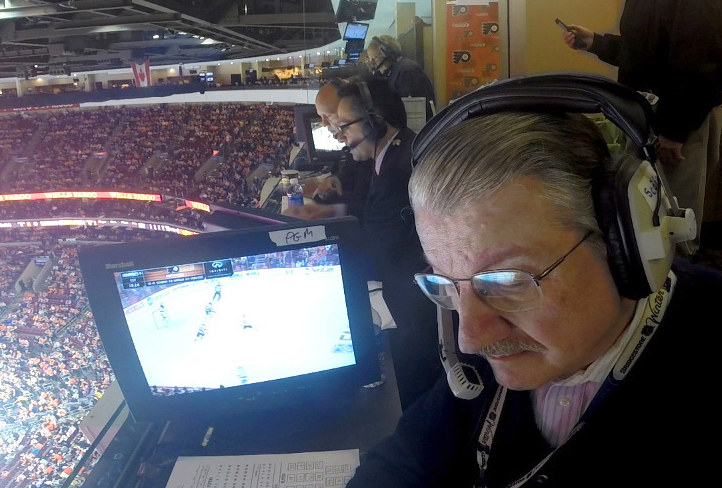
Steve Cangialosi (centre) providing play-by-play, alongside color analyst Ken Daneyko, for a MSG regional broadcast of a New Jersey Devils game

Regional network	Team(s)
Altitude Sports	Colorado
Angels Broadcast Television	Los Angeles
Chicago Sports Network	Chicago
Detroit SportsNet	Detroit
Fenway Sports Group (incl. NESN and SportsNet Pittsburgh)	Boston, Pittsburgh
KCOP-TV	Anaheim
KONG-TV; KING-TV (simulcast of select games); Amazon Prime Video	Seattle
Monumental Sports Network	Washington
MSG Networks	Buffalo, New Jersey, New York Islanders, New York Rangers
NBC Sports Regional Networks	Philadelphia, San Jose
NHL Local Media/Amazon Prime Video (starting in 2026)	Anaheim, Carolina, Columbus, Dallas, Minnesota, St. Louis
RDS (French-language)	Montreal, Ottawa
Scripps Sports	Florida, Nashville, Tampa Bay, Utah, Vegas
Sportsnet (select broadcasts air nationally as part of its national TV contract with the NHL in Canada)	Calgary, Edmonton, Toronto (partial), Vancouver
TSN	Montreal, Ottawa, Toronto (partial), Winnipeg

== See also ==
- Major League Baseball on television
- Major League Soccer on television
- National Basketball Association on television
- National Football League on television
