= NHL Network Showcase =

- Also known as: European Game of the Week
- Genre: NHL hockey telecasts
- Starring: Stephen Nelson; Mike Rupp; Kevin Weekes; E.J. Hradek; Jamie Hersch; Jackie Redmond; Jamison Coyle; Brian Lawton; Dave Reid; Kendall Coyne Schofield; Jennifer Botterill
- Country of origin: United States
- Original language: English
- No. of seasons: 2

Production
- Production location: Secaucus, New Jersey
- Camera setup: Multi-camera
- Running time: 180 minutes or until end of game
- Production company: NHL Network

Original release
- Network: NHL Network (2021–present)
- Release: February 6, 2021 – present

The NHL Network Showcase is a presentation of National Hockey League (NHL) games televised on NHL Network. It premiered on February 6, 2021 during the 2020–21 NHL season. The games primarily air on Saturday or Sunday afternoons, and were the first in-house NHL telecasts to be carried by NHL Network. The telecasts are also broadcast by the NHL's rightsholders in Europe as the European Game of the Week.

== History ==
In the 2018–19 NHL season, the NHL established the European Game of the Week, under which it would schedule weekend afternoon games intended for primetime broadcasts by the NHL's European media partners. The first of these games was the NHL Global Series game in Gothenburg, Sweden, on October 6, 2018.

For the shortened 2020–21 NHL season, NHL Network–which until then, primarily aired NHL games simulcast from regional sports networks and Canadian broadcasters–announced that it would introduce its first original NHL telecasts, known as the NHL Network Showcase. Modelled after the MLB Network Showcase on sister network MLB Network, it scheduled an inaugural slate of 16 games beginning on February 6, 2021, all of which were drawn from the European Game of the Week package. The first game was originally intended to be between the New Jersey Devils and New York Rangers. As multiple Devils games were postponed due to COVID-19 protocol, it was replaced by a game between the Colorado Avalanche and the St. Louis Blues.

The package returned for the 2021–22 NHL season, expanding to 25 games throughout the season.

== Production ==
As with most NHL games in the 2020–21 season due to COVID-19 protocol, NHL Network Showcase broadcasts are produced from clean feeds produced by the home team's regional rightsholder, with commentary, graphics, and surrounding coverage produced and added from NHL Network's studios in Secaucus, New Jersey. For the 2021–22 season, NHL Network began to employ an on-site skeleton crew to augment the host production with its own cameras, but otherwise continued to use a remote production as before.

With the introduction of an in-house broadcast, the European Game of the Week broadcast concurrently became a repackaged version of the NHL Network Showcase broadcast, carrying a separate intro and branding to the U.S. telecast with a focus on international players. During the 2021–22 season, NHL Network also produced nine games exclusively for international broadcasts.

== On-air staff ==
Stephen Nelson serves as the lead commentator for NHL Network Showcase broadcasts, with Brian Lawton, Dave Reid, Mike Rupp, and Kevin Weekes serving as a rotating team of analysts during the first season. E.J. Hradek and Mike Johnson were a secondary crew for a game in the 2021–22 season.
