= NHL on NBC =

Former American television series

- NHL on NBC logo (2012–2021)
- Genre: Live sports telecast
- Directed by: Billy McCoy; Ted Nathanson; Salvatore Nigita (technical director); Richard Sansevere (technical director)
- Presented by: Mike Emrick; Kenny Albert; Eddie Olczyk; Brian Boucher; Pierre McGuire; John Forslund; Brendan Burke; A. J. Mleczko; Joe Micheletti; NHL on NBC commentators
- Theme music composer: William Goldstein (1973)
- Opening theme: Matthew Sikora and Liz Forde
- Country of origin: United States
- Original language: English
- No. of seasons: 3 (1972–75 run); 16 (2006–21 run); 19 (total)

Production
- Executive producers: Scotty Connal; Terry O'Neil
- Producers: Glenn Adamo; Mike Finnocchiaro; John Shannon (feature producer)
- Production locations: Various NHL arenas (game telecasts and some pregame, intermission segments and occasional postgame); NBC's Stamford, CT studios (pregame, intermission segments and occasional postgame)
- Camera setup: Multi-camera
- Running time: 210 minutes or until game ended (inc. adverts)
- Production company: NBC Sports

Original release
- Network: NBC
- Release: April 10 – May 1, 1966
- Release: December 29, 1972 – May 25, 1975
- Release: January 14, 2006 – July 7, 2021
- Network: NBCSN
- Release: October 5, 2005 – June 30, 2021
- Network: CNBC
- Release: April 11, 2012 – May 30, 2021
- Network: USA Network
- Release: April 15, 2015 – June 24, 2021
- Network: Golf Channel
- Release: April 18, 2018

Related
- NHL on USA: NHL on TSN (former Canadian rightsholder); NHL on Sportsnet/Hockey Night in Canada (Canadian rightsholders)

The NHL on NBC is a presentation of National Hockey League (NHL) games produced by NBC Sports, and televised on NBC properties, including MSNBC, CNBC, Golf Channel, USA Network, NBCSN and Peacock in the United States.

While NBC covered the league at various points in its history, the network's last relationship with the NHL is the result of NBC Sports acquiring the league's broadcast television rights from ABC in 2005. Its most recent contract with the league ran until the end of the 2020–21 NHL season; NHL broadcasting rights onward have been acquired by ABC/ESPN and Turner Sports (now known as TNT Sports). Though the main NBC network no longer airs NHL games, NBC Sports Regional Networks currently airs some games in the form of game telecasts that air on a regional basis, featuring local NHL franchises that each of the regional networks has respective broadcast rights to air in their designated market.

From 2008 until the end of the NHL on NBC in 2021, NBC's regular season coverage included the annual NHL Winter Classic, an outdoor game usually played on New Year's Day; one national weekly regular season game each Sunday afternoon after New Year's Day; one week of nationally televised contests in February for Hockey Day in America; and one nationally televised game one day after Thanksgiving. NBCSN's coverage included 90 regular season games that were mostly aired on Monday, Tuesday, and Wednesday evenings, and later in the season on Sunday nights. Coverage of the Stanley Cup Playoffs was split between NBC and NBCSN, with CNBC and the USA Network (beginning in 2015) airing selected playoff games during the first two rounds.

== History ==
=== February 25, 1940 and 1966 ===
As part of a series of experimental broadcasts that W2XBS (now NBC's flagship station, WNBC) produced between 1939 and 1940, the station broadcast a game between the New York Rangers and Montreal Canadiens from Madison Square Garden on February 25, 1940. Bill Allen provided the commentary. About 300 people in the New York City area saw the Rangers win, 6–2. Over the next few years, W2XBS (later WNBT) carried some New York Rangers home games on a local basis. A few New York Americans and Rangers games were on experimental TV stations in 1940-41 and 1941-42; TV then closed down until 1945-46.

Regularly scheduled American network broadcasts of NHL games would not begin until the late 1950s, when CBS began carrying regular season games, but no playoff games. The deal was terminated in 1960, due to a combination of a dispute over the players receiving a share of the rights fee and the then-regional nature of the sport.

Nationally televised NHL games in the United States resumed for the 1965–66 NHL season, but this time on NBC; the regional issues were settled by the league's pending addition of six new teams, which expanded the league's reach nationwide and into lucrative markets in Pennsylvania and California (in addition to two other midwestern markets; NBC, however, would lose the broadcast rights before the six new teams would make it to play). In 1966, NBC became the first television network in the United States to air a national broadcast of a Stanley Cup Playoff game. The network provided coverage of four Sunday afternoon playoff games during the 1965–66 postseason. On April 10 and April 17, NBC aired semifinal games between the Chicago Black Hawks and the Detroit Red Wings. On April 24 and May 1, NBC aired Games 1 and 4 of the Stanley Cup Final between the Montreal Canadiens and the Detroit Red Wings. Win Elliot served as the play-by-play man while Bill Mazer served as the color commentator for the games.

NBC's coverage of the 1966 Stanley Cup Final marked the first time that hockey games were broadcast on network television in color. The CBC would follow suit the following year. NBC's Stanley Cup coverage preempted a sports anthology series called NBC Sports in Action, hosted by Jim Simpson and Bill Cullen, who were between-periods co-hosts for the Stanley Cup broadcasts.

NHL broadcast rights returned to CBS the next season, however due to other programming commitments, regular season games were handed off to RKO General.

=== 1970s ===
From 1972–73–1974–75, NBC not only televised the Stanley Cup Final (including a couple of games in prime time), but also weekly regular season games on Sunday afternoons. The previous contract with CBS was paying the NHL less than $2 million a year and NBC jumped in with an offer of $5.3 million. NBC also aired one regular season and a couple of playoff games in prime time during the first couple of seasons. Tim Ryan and Ted Lindsay (with Brian McFarlane as the intermission host) served as the commentators for NBC's NHL coverage during this period. Since most NHL teams still did not have players' names displayed on the backs of jerseys, NBC persuaded NHL commissioner Clarence Campbell to make teams put on players' names on NBC telecasts beginning with the 1973–74 season to help viewers identify them.

Peter Puck was introduced during NBC's NHL coverage in the 1970s. The animated character, whose cartoon adventures (produced by Hanna-Barbera) appeared on both NBC's Hockey Game of the Week and CBC's Hockey Night in Canada, explained hockey rules to the home viewing audience.

Besides Peter Puck, the 1970s version of The NHL on NBC had a between-periods feature titled Showdown. The concept of Showdown involved 20 of the NHL's greatest players (16 shooters and four goaltenders) going head-to-head in a taped penalty shot competition. After the NHL left NBC in 1975, Showdown continued to be seen on Hockey Night in Canada and local television broadcasts of U.S.-based NHL teams.

NBC did not broadcast the sixth game of the 1975 Final, in which the Philadelphia Flyers defeated the Buffalo Sabres to clinch their second consecutive championship, played in prime time on a Tuesday night. Had the Final gone to a seventh game, NBC would have pre-empted its prime-time lineup on a Thursday night to carry that deciding contest. But by that time, the network had informed the NHL that unless ratings for the Final spiked, it would drop the sport, which it did at the end of the season. In 1976, the NHL put together a syndication package that was carried in Chicago on WFLD.

Speaking of Chicago, WTTW carried the games of the 1974 and 1975 Stanley Cup Final that were not on NBC. The feed was syndicated by Hughes. WGN had picked it up in 1970 and 1972 (and originated Hawks road games in 1971 and 1973 unless CBS, then NBC, carried them), but passed in 1974 and 1975. In New York, the PBS station carried Game 5 of the 1974 Final at Boston and several of the games in 1975 that NBC did not have. While Hughes provided the hookup, it took the visiting team announcers like Gene Hart and Don Earle from Boston for the Bruins-Flyers series, for instance.

=== The dark years (1976–1989) ===
For 17 years after the 1975 Final, there would be no national over-the-air network coverage of the NHL in the United States (with the exception of CBS' coverage of game two of the 1979 Challenge Cup and game six of the 1980 Stanley Cup Final and NBC's coverage of the NHL All-Star Game beginning in 1990) and only spotty coverage on local TV stations and regional sports networks in markets that had NHL clubs. This was because no network was willing to commit to a large number of games, in turn, providing low ratings for NHL games. ABC would eventually resume broadcasting regular NHL games (on a time-buy basis through ESPN) for the 1992–93 season (and continuing through the 1993–94 season before Fox took over the broadcast television league rights for the next five seasons).

=== 1990s ===
From 1990 through 1994, NBC only televised the All Star Game. NBC reportedly wanted to test the appeal of hockey, having recently lost the Major League Baseball package to CBS. Shortly thereafter however, NBC would gain the broadcast television rights to the National Basketball Association (NBA) from CBS, thus there was a bit of a notion that NBC no longer really needed.

Marv Albert, and John Davidson called the action, while Mike Emrick served as an ice-level reporter in 1990. Meanwhile, Bill Clement served as an ice-level reporter in 1991, 1992 and 1994. Also, Hockey Night in Canada's Ron MacLean helped out with NBC's coverage of the 1993 All-Star Game, as would Brenda Brenon for the 1994 All-Star Game. In August 1989, The New York Times asked Marv Albert why had hockey lacked the popularity of other team sports in the United States. According to Albert, not many people have played hockey, and it was very difficult to capture as a televised sport. While Wayne Gretzky, playing for the Los Angeles Kings, had to help, there was according to Albert, also the impression that the owners encouraged fighting because they felt that the fans wanted it.

The Montreal Canadiens were slated to host the 1990 All-Star Game, but the team withdrew their bid to considerations due to the superb hosting by Quebec City of Rendez-vous '87. This had allowed the Pittsburgh Penguins, which wanted to host an All-Star Game in 1993, to move up three years early. For its part, Pittsburgh's organizers added much more to previous games, creating the first "true" All-Star weekend. Firstly was the addition of the Heroes of Hockey game, a two-period oldtimers' game between past NHL greats. The second was the addition of the National Hockey League All-Star Skills Competition, a competition between the players invited to the All-Star Game. The Skills competition was created by Paul Palmer, who adapted the Showdown feature seen on Hockey Night in Canada from 1972–73 to 1979–80. All-Star players would be rewarded with US$2,500 for any win in the skills competition.

As previously mentioned, when NBC broadcast the 1990 NHL All-Star Game, it marked the first time that a National Hockey League game of any kind was aired on American network television, since CBS aired Game 6 of the 1980 Stanley Cup Final. To accommodate the altered activities, the game itself was played on a Sunday afternoon instead of a Tuesday night, as was the case in previous years. This allowed NBC to air the game live across the United States – marking (surprisingly) the first time that a national audience would see Wayne Gretzky and Mario Lemieux play. Referees and other officials were also wired with microphones in this game, as were the two head coaches. Finally, NBC was also allowed to conduct interviews with players during stoppages in play, to the chagrin of the Hockey Night in Canada crew, whose attempts to do likewise were repeatedly denied by the league in previous years. NBC ultimately earned a 4.4 rating for the 1990 All-Star Game.

In 1991, NBC broke away from the telecast in the third period to televise a briefing from The Pentagon involving the Gulf War. SportsChannel America included the missing coverage in a replay of NBC's telecast (NBC owned 50% of Rainbow Enterprises, the parent of SportsChannel America).

There were reports about NBC making an arrangement to air four to eight regular season games for the 1992–93 season but nothing materialized. More specifically, NHL officials had arranged a four-to eight-game, time-buy package on NBC, but that fell through when the NHL wanted assurance that all NBC affiliates would carry the games (by 2006, NBC had generally gotten all but a couple of affiliates in the Top-50 markets to carry the games). For instance, in 1990, NBC's affiliates in Atlanta (NBC's coverage of the 1992 All-Star Game aired on the independent station WTLK in that market), Charlotte, Memphis, New Orleans, Indianapolis and Phoenix did not clear the game (Atlanta and Phoenix would eventually receive NHL teams, however the Atlanta franchise relocated to Winnipeg in 2011). Ultimately, roughly 15% of the nation did not have access to the game. As previously mentioned, ABC became the league's network broadcaster instead, and then Fox won a bidding war with CBS for television rights lasting from the 1994–95 through 1998–99 seasons.

NBC's coverage of the 1993 All-Star Game drew a .450 rating in the males 18-34 bracket, the highest among sports shows this year and well above the NBA's .350 average.

=== 2000s ===
==== 2002 Winter Olympics ====
In 2002, NBC broadcast the Winter Olympics from Salt Lake City, Utah. It marked the first time that NBC televised the Winter Olympics since the 1972 Games from Sapporo, Japan. For the men's hockey tournament, NBC enlisted ESPN and ABC's Gary Thorne to call the games with color commentator John Davidson. The secondary announcing crew consisted of Fox's Kenny Albert and ESPN and ABC's Joe Micheletti. Albert also did play–by–play for the women's tournament alongside Lisa Brown-Miller. Meanwhile, ESPN and ABC's Darren Pang served as ice-level reporter for both the men's and women's ice hockey tournaments. ESPN and ABC's Bill Clement worked with Jim Lampley as a studio analyst during their coverage of both ice hockey tournaments.

==== Terms of the deal ====
NHL on NBC logo used from 2005 to 2011.

In May 2004, NBC reached an agreement with the NHL to broadcast a slate of regular season games and the Stanley Cup Final. The plan called for NBC to air at least six weeks of regular season games (three regional games each week) on Saturday afternoons. In addition, NBC was to show one or two playoff games per weekend during the playoffs. Between two and five games from the Stanley Cup Final would air in prime time (OLN/Versus received the other two as part of its package). NBC's primary game each week, as well as the Stanley Cup Final, would air in high definition.

Unlike previous network television deals with the NHL (like Fox, which had the rights from 1994 to 1999 and ABC, which had the rights from 1999 to 2004), NBC paid no upfront rights fee, instead splitting advertising revenue with the league after meeting its own production and distribution costs. On the other hand, the league avoided the arrangement some minor sports leagues have, in which they pay networks for broadcast time and produce their own telecasts, but keep any advertising revenue.

The last time NBC Sports entered a television deal which did not require it to pay any rights fees was in 1994–1995, when the division was involved in the Major League Baseball joint venture called "The Baseball Network." To a lesser extent, NBC also had a similar sort of revenue-sharing agreement with the Arena Football League (AFL) and, because of their ownership in the XFL, also paid no rights fees for airing that league.

NBC's out-of-market games were available on NHL Center Ice through the 2006–07 season; NBC switched to stand-alone games for the 2007–08 season.

==== 2004–05 NHL lockout ====
NBC's initial contract with the NHL ran for two years, with an option given to the network to renew for two additional years. NBC's NHL coverage was delayed a year because of the 2004–05 NHL lockout, which wound up cancelling the entire regular season and following playoffs. NBC instead decided to replace five of its scheduled NHL broadcasts with alternate sports programming (such as reruns of NASCAR Year in Review and The Purina Incredible Dog Challenge). NBC also decided to give one of the slots back to local affiliates, some of which filled the time given back to them with infomercials.

==== NHL on Versus ====
NHL on Versus logo used from 2006 to 2011.

The NHL on Versus was a presentation of National Hockey League (NHL) games broadcast on Versus. The NHL's television deal with Versus was made at the conclusion of the 2004–05 NHL lockout that caused the cancellation of an entire season. At the time, Versus offered a two-year, US$130 million contract (with a network option for a third year). Versus was expected to use NHL coverage to show it was a legitimate suitor for Major League Baseball and National Football League packages that were to be negotiated later in 2005, but they did not land agreements with either league. In 2007, the NHL signed an agreement to extend the NHL on Versus to the 2010–2011 season. Versus paid $72.5 million for 2007–2008 and will pay inflationary increases over the next three years. The network broadcast at least 54 games during the regular season (usually two games per week, sometimes three or just one), plus the All-Star Game, Skills Competition, and YoungStars game.

At the end of the season, the network would have blanket coverage of the playoffs, culminating in the first two games of the Stanley Cup Final. Versus also showed the NHL Awards Show and first round of the NHL Draft (both a simulcast from Canadian television).

Under the terms of the contract running from 2007–2011, Versus aired 54 or more NHL games each season, generally on Monday and Tuesday nights, and provided coverage of as many Stanley Cup Playoff games as possible (generally two per night in the first two rounds; the conference finals are usually played on alternating days), and two games of the Stanley Cup Final (games three and four in 2009, 2010 and 2011).

In the 2006–07 season, Versus began to carry an exclusive national "game of the week"; the games were typically scheduled on Monday nights, though aired on Tuesday nights during the National Football League season in defense of Monday Night Football. No other broadcaster could carry an NHL game during the window, although the league stated that it would try to arrange its schedule in future seasons so that few other games would be played during the window.

Versus also provided postgame coverage after every game it broadcast. The postgame show was initially known as Hockey Central, airing from their Stamford, Connecticut, studios. Beginning in the 2011–12 season, the program was renamed NHL Live, and began incorporating NHL on NBC personalities in its coverage.

==== 2005–06 season ====
NHL games officially returned to NBC under the new agreement on January 14, 2006, debuting with three regional games (New York Rangers at Detroit Red Wings, Colorado Avalanche at Philadelphia Flyers, which is also aired on NBC Sports Philadelphia also followed by the Dallas Stars at Boston Bruins) to substantial praise among hockey fans and writers, who often compare the television network's presentation to Hockey Night in Canada, which is broadcast in full on the NHL Center Ice package (although some writers even speculated that NBC's playoff broadcasts were superior to CBC's, largely because of their choice of announcers and the fact that NBC provided HD coverage of games prior to the Final).

Games one and two of the Stanley Cup Final were on OLN, while the remainder of the series was on NBC. NBC's broadcast of game seven drew a 3.3 rating, a 21% drop from ABC's 4.2 for game seven in 2004. However, some NBC affiliates did not air game seven live. Overall, NBC had an average rating of 2.3 for its five telecasts of the final, down 12% from ABC's 2004 average.

==== 2006–07 season ====
For the 2006–07 season, NBC broadcast three regional NHL games per weekend of coverage during the regular season. The network also scheduled ten coverage windows during the playoffs (not including the Stanley Cup Final). The additional broadcasts were expected to replace the Arena Football League, which NBC dropped after the 2006 season. NBC also produced two games per week in high definition, up from one in 2005–06.

The newly titled NHL on NBC Game of the Week returned on January 13, 2007, with three regional games (between the Los Angeles and St. Louis Blues, Boston Bruins and New York Rangers, and Pittsburgh Penguins and Philadelphia Flyers) at 2 p.m. Eastern Time. Games started at various times, ranging from 12:30 to 3:30 p.m. during the season (this variation primarily resulted from NBC's commitments to the PGA Tour and other programming).

NBC moved its NHL telecasts to Sundays after its season premiere (which occurred on a Saturday) for the final eight dates of the season. The nine weeks of games (totaling 22 regional games) scheduled by the network amounted to the league's most extensive U.S. broadcast television coverage since 1998, during Fox's tenure. A new Sunday Night Football-esque horizontal score banner, designed by Troika Design Group, also debuted during the season.

The 2007 Stanley Cup Final was also notable for its exceptionally poor television ratings in the United States. Games one and two were carried by cable channel Versus, then a new and little-known player on the sports television scene. Game one produced a 0.5 national rating or 523,000 households. It was the 58th best-rated program of that day. Game two produced a 0.4 national rating or 446,000 households, lower than the 2006 WNBA All-Star Game on ESPN, which drew 447,000 households. It was the 74th best-rated program of that day.

The move to NBC did little to compensate for the series' limited drawing power. A perennial last among the Big Four American television networks, NBC was at the time going through an intense period of ratings turmoil, setting lowest rated week records in several viewing categories over the course of Spring 2007.

Game three's coverage on NBC garnered a mere 1.1 rating (approximately 1,205,600 households), making it the lowest-rated prime-time broadcast in NBC's history. For comparison, game six of the NBA Eastern Conference finals, broadcast opposite game three on cable channel TNT, achieved a 5.3 rating, approximately 5,808,800 households. Game four achieved a 1.9 rating (approximately 2,082,400 households), down 5% from game four the previous year. Game five received slightly less, 1.8 (approximately 1,972,800 households). As a whole, NBC's ratings for the championship series were down 20% from the previous season, making it the least watched final in the United States.

At the time, Versus was only available to 50% of cable-equipped homes in the Los Angeles area, which hurt the buzz around the Ducks' playoff run in a traditionally crowded sports and entertainment market. Versus was the fifth-most watched cable network in the Los Angeles market for game one, good only for a 1.7 local rating.

Local numbers did improve as the series moved to NBC. The Cup-clinching game five drew a 6.0 and a 12 share for an average audience of 496,000 viewers in the Los Angeles market, twice larger than a high-profile regular season game between baseball's Los Angeles Dodgers and San Diego Padres on KCAL 9 (3.0/5, 218,000 viewers). This symbolic, if short-lived, victory against one of the region's flagship teams allowed the Ducks to close the series on a relatively high note, with the Los Angeles Times' Larry Stewart calling their final ratings performance "pretty good".

==== 2007 playoffs controversy ====
On May 19, 2007, during the Stanley Cup playoffs, NBC angered many fans and journalists when it pre-empted coverage of the overtime period of the tied Game 5 of the Eastern Conference finals between the Ottawa Senators and Buffalo Sabres, a game in which the Senators could have potentially advanced with a win, instead going directly to pre-race coverage of the Preakness Stakes horse race. A typical "Triple Crown" horse racing broadcast generally contains about two hours of pre-race coverage, with the actual races lasting only two or three minutes. Coverage of the overtime period was shifted to Versus, the league's cable partner, although viewers in Buffalo and Rochester were able to continue watching the game on local NBC affiliates in the respective markets, WGRZ and WHEC-TV.

The move was originally seen not only as a snub of small-market teams (such as and not just the Sabres), but hockey in general. Even worse, many hockey fans did not realise that Daniel Alfredsson scored the series-winning goal at 9:32 of overtime at 5:20 p.m. ET until NBC showed the highlights. That was later repeated, in 2026, when NBC advising the viewers that the gold medal game would air at 1:10 p.m. ET over on USA Network, while figure skating aired at 1 p.m. ET over on NBC, except that fans got to see the entire USA-Canada entire overtime period on NBC and the goal that won it, later presented in the highlights during its primetime coverage dubbed as Primetime in Milan. However, NBC and the NHL later revealed that the Preakness deal had been made several years before and contained mandatory advertising commitments during the pre-race build-up. Both sides could have agreed that the entire game would air only on Versus or begin earlier in the day, but the NHL wanted at least one Eastern Conference finals game to air on NBC and said that it does not schedule with the assumption that games will go into overtime. Moreover, an earlier start time could not be arranged because the broadcast window was fixed in advance, and both the NHL and NBC needed the flexibility to pick the Western Conference finals for that window if they so desired.

Since then, NBC had contingency plans if scenarios like this occur moving forward. Starting in 2008 until 2016, the NBC hockey game started airing 12:30 p.m. ET so that the network can show at least one overtime period if it gets there (at max two). Starting in 2016, NBC aired playoff game at about 7:15 p.m. ET immediately following horse racing. 2016 was the only year NBC aired a playoff game before and after the Kentucky Derby.

In 2006, NBC televised Game 1 of the Eastern Conference finals between the Sabres and Carolina Hurricanes on the same day as the Preakness. Before the game, Bill Clement advised the audience that in the event that the game went into overtime, it would be televised on Versus, or OLN, as it was known at the time. The Sabres won the game in regulation.

NBC's Seattle affiliate, KING-TV, opted not to carry NBC's telecasts of the Stanley Cup Final in 2006, 2007, 2008, and 2013, when the games began at 5 p.m. Pacific time, choosing to instead air its regular lineup of local newscasts and syndicated shows. KONG picked up the NBC telecasts of the games, and CBC Television's broadcasts of the games were available to most cable providers in the region through the network's Vancouver owned-and-operated station CBUT. For the 2007 and 2008 Stanley Cup Final, however, KING-TV aired NBC's Saturday night telecasts, while KONG aired the other NBC telecasts. As for the 2009 Stanley Cup Final, KING-TV aired Games 1, 2 and 5 while KONG aired Games 6 and 7.

==== NHL on NBC Faceoff ====
For the 2006–07 season, NBC added an online, broadband-only pregame show to its NHL coverage (similar to what it does with its Notre Dame football coverage). Titled NHL on NBC Countdown to Faceoff, the show airs for a half-hour before every NHL on NBC telecast on NBCSports.com and features a breakdown of upcoming action, as well as reports from the game sites and a feature on an NHL player.

On March 27, 2007, NBC Sports and the NHL agreed to a one-year contract extension with a network option for a second year.

Beginning in 2007–08, NBC incorporated "flex scheduling" for its NHL coverage, similar to NFL broadcasts. Through this method, the league selects at least three potential games at the start of the season for most of NBC's regular-season coverage dates. Thirteen days prior to the game, NBC then selects one to air as its Game of the Week, then the other two games move outside of NBC's broadcast window and return to teams' regional carriers. Since the league made network coverage a priority in the 1990s, regionalized coverage had been the norm; NBC is the first network to attempt to regularly present one game to the entire country. Additionally, studio segments began to originate from the game site instead of 30 Rockefeller Center. All game telecasts also began to be produced in 1080i high definition.

NBC began its 2007–08 schedule on January 1, 2008, with the NHL Winter Classic, an outdoor hockey game between the Buffalo Sabres and Pittsburgh Penguins at Ralph Wilson Stadium. The game went head-to-head with some of the New Year's Day college football bowl games, but none of the feature Bowl Championship Series games. While never expected to beat or directly compete with football ratings, the timing was designed to take advantage of the large audience flipping between channels to watch the different bowl games. It was the first such game to be televised live by an American network and the NHL's first outdoor regular season game since the Edmonton Oilers and Montreal Canadiens played the Heritage Classic, which aired on CBC, which served as the Canadian broadcaster of the 2008 Classic. Although originally maligned as a mere publicity stunt by some in the media, the 2008 Winter Classic drew a 2.6 rating in the U.S. (or about 2.9 million viewers) according to Nielsen, the highest rating for a regular-season contest since February 1996, when Fox was the league's network partner. By comparison, CBS received a 2.7 rating for the Gator Bowl, which also had a 1:00 p.m. start.

Beginning that season, all regular season telecasts air mainly on Sunday afternoons, except for those occurring the day after Thanksgiving and on New Year's Day.

In April 2008, NBC announced the activation of its option to retain broadcasting rights for the 2008–09 season. NBC's scheduling for that year was similar to that which it had during the 2007–08 season (flex scheduling for regular-season games, up to five games of the Stanley Cup Final – changing in 2009 to include the first two and last three games, among others) except that all (or nearly all) of the Sunday-afternoon games now began at 12:30 p.m. Eastern Time. Coverage again included the Winter Classic outdoor game on January 1, 2009, between the Detroit Red Wings and Chicago Blackhawks at Wrigley Field.

==== 2008–09 season ====
NBC broadcast the first two and final three games of the Stanley Cup Final, while Versus broadcast Games 3 and 4. The first two games of the series were played on consecutive nights due to NBC's scheduling.

Game seven was the final major sporting event on analog television in the United States, with the DTV transition finishing less than an hour-and-a-half after the game ended, and just one hour after live NBC coverage ended. NBC affiliates WDIV-TV in Detroit and WPXI in Pittsburgh – which months before the playoffs began, elected to keep their own respective analog signals on until June 12, well past the original February 17 deadline – both remained on the air for game seven before cutting their analog signals at 11:59 P.M. EDT.

==== Teams featured ====
Regular-season NHL telecasts on NBC itself usually only feature U.S.-based teams. During the Stanley Cup playoffs, broadcasting a game involving a Canadian team might be unavoidable. NBC has the first choice of games and times on its scheduled broadcast dates. The Canadian broadcasters (currently CBC and Sportsnet) are required to adjust accordingly during the playoffs, even though their rights fee is three times as high as NBC's.

There have been a few exceptions to this policy since 2006; in 2008, the Montreal Canadiens became the first Canadian team featured on the NHL on NBC during the regular season (NBC Sports' Dick Ebersol was rumored to have specifically wanted to do a game from Montreal at some point). The Canadiens played the New York Rangers on February 3. The 2014 NHL Winter Classic also featured a Canadian team, the Toronto Maple Leafs, up against the Detroit Red Wings at Michigan Stadium. Due to the revamp of the league's conferences and divisions that season, the cross-border rivalry had become an interdivisional one with the Wings' move to the Eastern Conference. The 2016 NHL Winter Classic had the Montreal Canadiens and Boston Bruins in Foxboro, Massachusetts. The Boston/Montreal rivalry is generally considered the fiercest in the NHL; in fact, there were rumblings that if Montreal were not Boston's opponent in the 2016 Classic that Boston would relinquish the game. NBCSN will occasionally feature Canadian teams during the regular season, but primarily only the Canadiens and the Maple Leafs, and only if they are playing a U.S.-based team.

Like its predecessors, NBC frequently chose games with a focus on about six to eight teams: the New York Rangers, Detroit Red Wings, Pittsburgh Penguins, Philadelphia Flyers, Boston Bruins, and Chicago Blackhawks, and most recently the Los Angeles Kings, the Vegas Golden Knights, and the Washington Capitals. The relation has very little correlation with team success; for instance, the Anaheim Ducks won the Stanley Cup in 2007, and the Buffalo Sabres made it to the conference finals in both 2006 and 2007. Those teams received one and two potential games respectively in the 2008 season, compared to the seven potential games given to the Rangers and the four games which could include the Flyers. Buffalo has fared better in its number of NBCSN appearances, due in part to the channel's relatively high viewership in the Buffalo market; it was noted in 2018 that their appearances on that network were in decline.

The most frequently cited reasons for this relative lack of diversity are low ratings in a market (such as for the Anaheim Ducks, New York Islanders, and New Jersey Devils, which share markets with an Original Six team or a 1967 expansion team), market size (such as for Buffalo, where hockey ratings are the highest of any U.S. team, but the market itself is the smallest of any American NHL team), and Comcast's common ownership of both the Flyers and NBC, allowing the network to self-deal and cross-promote the Flyers on national television.

Examples of the above trends could be found in NBC Sports' national schedule for the 2015-16 regular season. In a press release announcing this schedule, NBC stated all U.S. teams would make at least one appearance on NBC or NBCSN during the regular season, but hockey writer Greg Wyshynski noted that:

- The Chicago Blackhawks (21), Pittsburgh Penguins and Philadelphia Flyers (tied at 18), Detroit Red Wings (16), and New York Rangers (13) made the most appearances on the schedule. The Flyers were tied for second despite missing the playoffs during the previous season.
- Five U.S. teams (the Arizona Coyotes, Carolina Hurricanes, Columbus Blue Jackets, Florida Panthers, and New Jersey Devils) only made 1 appearance each, while the Montreal Canadiens made 6 total appearances.
- The Anaheim Ducks, who advanced to the conference finals during the previous season, only made 4 appearances, while the Los Angeles Kings and the San Jose Sharks, who both missed the playoffs, appeared 10 and 11 times, respectively.
- The only Canadian teams to be scheduled were the Edmonton Oilers (despite drafting top prospect Connor McDavid with the first pick in the 2015 NHL entry draft) and Toronto Maple Leafs (despite having hired long-time Detroit Red Wings head coach Mike Babcock), both with one appearance each. The four remaining teams, who did each advance to the playoffs during the previous season, did not appear.

For the 2018–19 season, NBCSN announced that it would re-brand its Wednesday Night Rivalry broadcasts as Wednesday Night Hockey, with a larger focus on showcasing star players rather than league rivalries. With these changes, the network promoted that its schedule would feature a wider variety of teams, including games between Canadian teams. The October 24, 2018 game between the Toronto Maple Leafs and Winnipeg Jets marked the first time that NBC had ever originated its own telecast of a regular season game between Canadian opponents.

==== Innovations ====
Some of the innovations that NBC brought for its NHL telecasts included putting a star clock underneath the scoreboard at the top of the screen. During each game, NBC took one player from each team and clocks how long that player is out on the ice each time he comes out for a shift. In addition, goalies like Vegas' Marc-Andre Fleury may have worn cameras inside their masks, much like Fox asked catchers to do for its Major League Baseball game broadcasts.

NBC was the first broadcaster to put one of their game color commentators (e.g. Pierre McGuire, Brian Boucher, or Darren Pang) in-between the two teams' benches, for what NBC called "Inside the Glass" reporting. In addition to providing color commentary, this allowed the "Inside the Glass" reporter to observe and report on the benches, as well was interviewing the coaches periodically. This was contrary to traditional broadcasts, with the play-by-play and color commentator(s) all in the broadcast booth, and the rinkside reporter providing no analysis during the game. Other national and regional broadcasters eventually followed suit for selected telecasts (not every NHL arena has enough room for multiple reporters between the benches), although they would use generic terms such as "ice level" or "between-the-benches" reporter instead of NBC's "Inside the Glass" definition.

=== 2010s ===
NBC renewed its rights to the NHL for the 2010–11 season. The network broadcast schedule continued to include the Winter Classic, Sunday-afternoon games at 12:30 p.m. Eastern Time, six weekends of playoff action, and broadcasts of all but two games of the Stanley Cup Final (which aired on NBCSN, NBC cable sports channel).

On February 20, 2011, NBC introduced Hockey Day in America – patterned after the CBC's Hockey Day in Canada, it featured eight of the most popular American teams in regional games: the Washington Capitals at the Buffalo Sabres, the Philadelphia Flyers at the New York Rangers, and the Detroit Red Wings at the Minnesota Wild, followed by the Pittsburgh Penguins at the Chicago Blackhawks for the national nightcap. The Flyers-Rangers game was aired in the majority of the country, while the Sabres-Capitals game was only seen in the Buffalo and Washington, D.C., markets; as was the Red Wings-Wild game in their respective markets. The tripleheader was completed with the 2011 Heritage Classic, for which viewers were redirected to Versus.

==== 2011–21 contract ====
On April 19, 2011, after ESPN, Turner Sports and Fox Sports placed bids, NBC Sports announced it had reached a ten-year extension to its television contract with the NHL (through the 2020–21 season) worth nearly $2 billion over the tenure of the contract. The contract would cover games on both NBC and Versus; the channel became a sister network to NBC via Comcast's acquisition of NBC Universal, and was imminently rebranded under the NBC Sports name. The channel eventually rebranded as NBC Sports Network (NBCSN) in January 2012. Beginning in the 2011–12 season, the NHL on Versus branding was dropped in preparation for the channel's rebranding as NBCSN, with its broadcasts now carrying the NHL on NBC branding and production.

The terms of the deal included:

- A rights fee of roughly US$200 million per year for the combined cable and broadcast rights, nearly triple that of the previous contract;
- Increased weekly regular season coverage on NBCSN (as many as 90 games per season on Monday, Tuesday, and Wednesday nights), with Sunday night games also being added by the channel later in the season.
- Rights to an annual "Thanksgiving Showdown" game airing on NBC the day after Thanksgiving ("Black Friday" afternoon) (the 2012 edition was cancelled due to the 2012–13 NHL lockout). The November broadcast is the earliest an NHL regular season game has aired on a broadcast television network in the U.S. since the 1950s, when the league still only had six teams. The 2013 "Thanksgiving Showdown" game featured the Boston Bruins hosting the New York Rangers; it was widely expected that Boston will remain the home team in future years and launch a holiday tradition for the league and network (Boston has hosted matinee games the day after Thanksgiving since the 1980s), much like Detroit and Dallas traditionally host National Football League games on Thanksgiving Day; however, NBC decided to end this tradition for the 2014–15 season, with a Black Friday matinee between the Philadelphia Flyers and New York Rangers being aired instead, while Boston held a locally televised game on the evening of Black Friday in 2014. Boston resumed hosting the game in 2015, with a second Black Friday game (Chicago at Anaheim) airing later in the afternoon on NBCSN.
- Continued coverage on NBC of the Bridgestone NHL Winter Classic to be played on New Year's Day unless that day lands on a Sunday, in which case the game is moved to January 2 (despite the open time slot on Sunday afternoons, NBC is effectively forbidden via a gentleman's agreement with the NFL which prevents any form of strong counterprogramming against NFL games televised on CBS and Fox). Initially, the Classic was expected to be played in primetime; however, to date, every game has been scheduled for a 1 PM ET start, and due to new competition from the College Football Playoff the game is now expected to remain a daytime game for the foreseeable future. NBC has instead opted to air one prime time game each year, later in the season, since 2014.
- A national "Game of the Week" continuing on NBC as in previous years, beginning each January (January is the start month due to NBC's contract with the NFL).
- Hockey Day in America is becoming a permanent annual part of the NBC schedule.
- Rights to any future Heritage Classics, which would be aired on NBCSN.
- Digital rights across all platforms for any games broadcast by NBC or NBCSN.
- Increased coverage of Stanley Cup Playoff games, with all playoff games airing nationally on NBC, NBCSN, CNBC, USA, and NHL Network. (MSNBC and even Golf Channel were once previously used for Stanley Cup playoff games.) Local sports networks carried their teams' first-round games, but any games on NBC in the first round, and any games from all rounds thereafter, were exclusive to NBC.
- Continued sharing of the Stanley Cup Final on NBCSN, which aired Games 2 & 3; and NBC for everything else, plus the if-needed games.
- NHL regular-season games on NBC were exclusive to the network. While some NHL games on NBCSN are exclusive (such as Wednesday Night Hockey), other games carried by the network may be blacked out regionally in favor of television stations or regional sports networks which hold the local broadcast rights to an NHL franchise. Among the games normally blacked out from NBCSN include teams that their respective NBC Sports Regional Networks carry, as well as the Boston Bruins (NESN), Detroit Red Wings (Fox Sports Detroit), New York Rangers (MSG Network), Pittsburgh Penguins (AT&T SportsNet Pittsburgh) and St. Louis Blues (Fox Sports Midwest).

As mentioned earlier, NBC Sports Regional broadcasts are occasionally simulcast on the NBC networks. This also applied during the first round of the Stanley Cup playoffs. Games featuring Canadian teams sometimes used a simulcast of either CBC or Sportsnet (and previously TSN).

In the 2012–13 season, Wednesday night games on NBCSN were rebranded as Wednesday Night Rivalry, primarily featuring rivalry games. For the 2013–14 season, NBC Sports introduced the series NHL Rivals, which looks back at the participating teams' historic rivalry leading up to the featured Wednesday Night Rivalry game.

Beginning in the 2014–15 season, TSN Hockey personalities Bob McKenzie, Darren Dreger and Chris Cuthbert joined the NHL on NBC team. This was the result of Rogers Media's – the owners of Sportsnet – exclusive 12-year deal with the NHL in Canada, replacing both TSN and CBC Sports as the rights-holders to the NHL.

In 2014, NBC Sports partnered with Electronic Arts to integrate NHL on NBC presentation into its NHL video game series, beginning with NHL 15. Complementing the change, Mike Emrick and Eddie Olczyk also voiced commentary and other appearances in the game. The score bug can be switched to a transparent view in order for players to be shown at the top of the screen, if necessary. This would continue up into NHL 19, in which it would be replaced with the generic graphic package, starting with NHL 20.

In 2015, NBC Sports partnered with the league to expand Kraft Hockeyville into the United States. The annual contest, in which communities compete to demonstrate their commitment to ice hockey, with the winning community being awarded the opportunity to host a nationally televised NHL preseason game, was first held across Canada in 2006. Similar to what CBC Sports had done in covering Kraft Hockeyville in Canada, NBC Sports began airing regular segments on the separate Hockeyville USA competition for communities in the U.S. On September 29, 2015, NBCSN aired the inaugural Kraft Hockeyville USA game at Cambria County War Memorial Arena, Johnstown, Pennsylvania, marking the first time that the NHL on NBC televised a preseason game since it acquired the American rights in 2005.

During the 2015–16 season, exclusive Sunday night games on NBCSN were rebranded as Sunday Night Hockey, with the first game under the new brand taking place on January 10, 2016, between the New Jersey Devils and the Minnesota Wild. A weekly recap show, NHL Sunday Shootout, premiered on the same day. NBC also began to air select Game of the Week and Sunday Night Hockey broadcasts under the Star Sunday banner starting with the 2016–17 season, devoting special coverage to the game's featured players of the week.

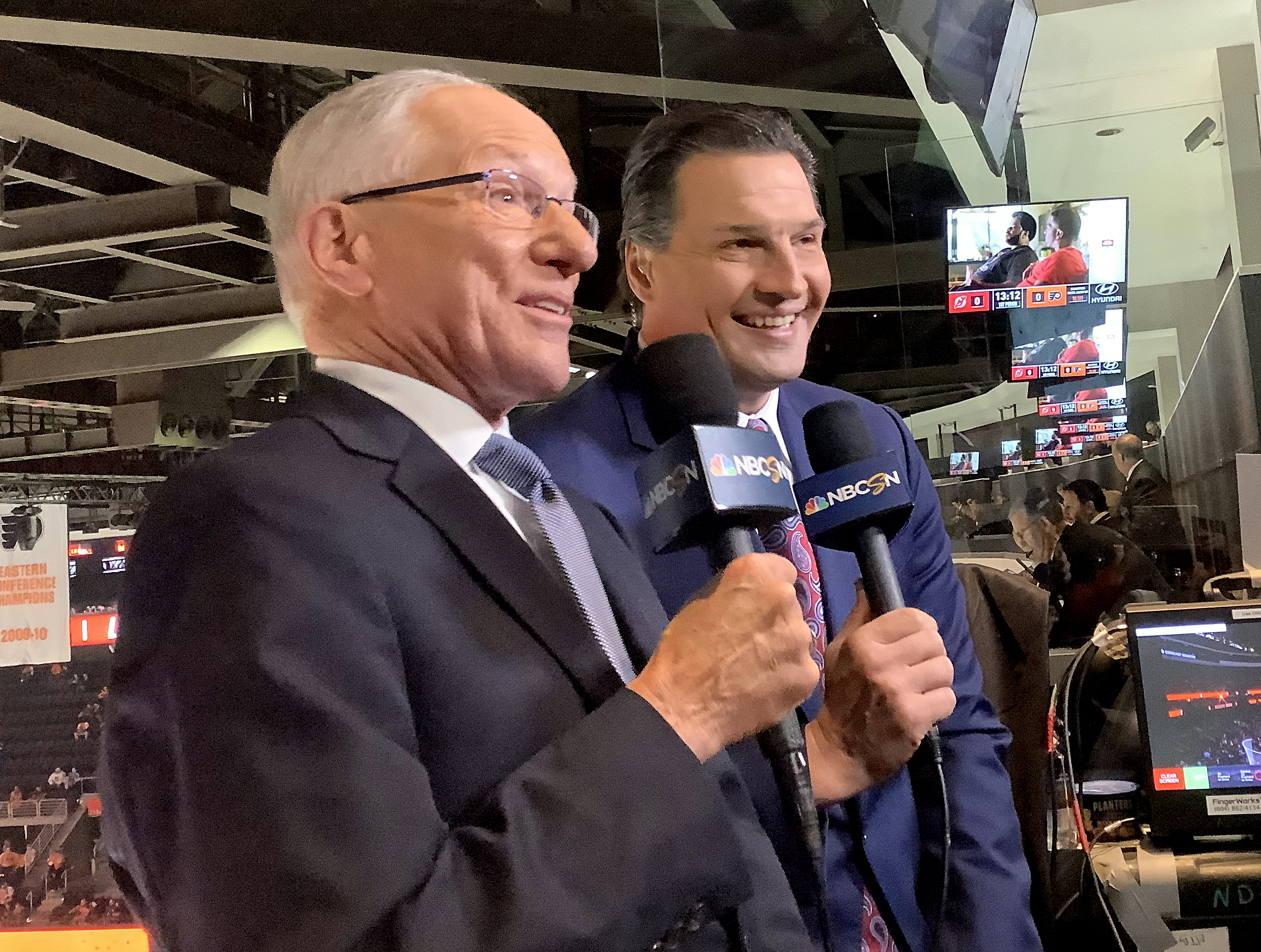
Mike Emrick and Eddie Olczyk working a game on NHL on NBCSN (2019).

Starting in the 2016–17 season, NBC began to use its regional networks (then primarily-branded as Comcast SportsNet) to originate coverage of games involving teams whose regional rights are owned by an NBC (in this case, Chicago Blackhawks, Philadelphia Flyers, San Jose Sharks, and Washington Capitals). These broadcasts used the video footage from the regional broadcaster, overlaid with national commentators. In the 2017 playoffs, NBC used its regional networks for games involving Chicago, San Jose, and Washington.

At the start of the 2018–19 season, NBC rotated Pierre McGuire and Brian Boucher on the lead broadcast team of Mike Emrick and Eddie Olczyk. This means that McGuire will call the Wednesday Night Hockey late game while Boucher joins the lead team of Emrick and Olczyk on the early game. McGuire, however, was still assigned to work with the lead team on Wednesday Night Hockey singleheaders, weekly Game of the Week broadcasts, and the 2019 Stanley Cup Final. However, as of the start of the 2019–20 season, Boucher now works with the lead team in East Coast games while McGuire continues to appear on other West Coast broadcasts. In addition, NBC began using U.S. women's ice hockey stars A. J. Mleczko and Kendall Coyne Schofield as game analysts on select broadcasts, and NBC even assigned Mike Tirico to call play-by-play on a few broadcasts.

During the 2019–20 season, NBCSN flexed in several Washington Capitals games in February in anticipation of Alexander Ovechkin's 700th NHL goal. Those games used the NBC Sports Washington feed and announcers. In one instance, the February 10 broadcast involving the Capitals and New York Islanders aired nationally on NBCSN (blacked out in the team's local markets) at the expense of its originally-scheduled game between the Tampa Bay Lightning and Columbus Blue Jackets, which only aired on the team's local markets. However, NBCSN missed out on covering Ovechkin's 700th goal (which took place on Saturday afternoon, February 22, against the New Jersey Devils), due to a prior commitment with the 2020 Guinness Six Nations Rugby Championship. NHL Network aired the game instead.

Beginning with the 2019–20 season, the network began to employ a theme song for their Wednesday Night Hockey telecasts, using "Fire, Ready, Aim" by Green Day and a music video starring the band and various NHL players, as part of a long-term promotional agreement between the band, the network and the league.

On February 16, 2020, NBC announced that it had assigned an all-female crew to call the Blues–Blackhawks game on March 8 in Chicago in honor of International Women's Day. The game featured Kate Scott on play-by-play, A. J. Mleczko as booth analyst and Kendall Coyne Schofield as "Inside the Glass" analyst. Kathryn Tappen and Jennifer Botterill were tapped to work the game in the studio.

==== Stanley Cup Final coverage ====
In 2014, NBCSN broadcast games three and four, while NBC televised the remaining games. NBC Sports originally planned to repeat its coverage pattern from the last few seasons: NBCSN would televise game two and three, while NBC would broadcast game one, and then games four and five. After the League scheduled game two on the day of the Belmont Stakes, coverage of games two and four were switched so NBC's telecast of the horse race would serve as lead-in programming to game two. Due to the death of a family member, NBC's lead play-by-play announcer Mike Emrick missed game one. Kenny Albert, who was also the New York Rangers radio announcer for WEPN and announced several national games (including the Western Conference finals) for NBC/NBCSN, filled in for Emrick in the first game. However, NBC's idea of airing Game 2, instead of Game 4, backfired after LA lead 3-0 before New York won Game 4 and then Alec Martinez scored the Stanley Cup winning 2OT goal in Game 5. That mistake was, later, repeated in the 2026 Winter Olympics with USA Network airing the women's hockey gold medal game between the United States and Canada, by airing the United States-Sweden semifinal game instead. NBC aired figure skating in its place; CBC, however, aired the hockey game as it was, according to IOC president Kirsty Coventry, not a "high demand" game.

It was originally announced that games two and three of the 2015 Final were to be broadcast by NBCSN, with the remainder on NBC. Game two was moved to NBC to serve as a lead-out for its coverage of the 2015 Belmont Stakes in favor of game four on NBCSN. As Eddie Olczyk was also a contributor to NBC's Belmont coverage, he was absent during game two.

On May 27, 2016, NBC Sports announced that if the Final was tied at 1–1 entering game three, then it would have aired on NBC and game four televised on NBCSN. However, if one team led 2–0 (as this eventually happened), game three moved to NBCSN and then game four on NBC.

By the end of NBC's run with the NHL in 2021, no matter the circumstance of the series, while NBCSN aired two of the first three games, NBC aired everything else, which included all the if-needed ones so that every potentially clinching game of the championship series would be on broadcast over-the-air television.

==== NBC Sports Radio ====
On Tuesday, May 3, 2016, NBC Sports Radio was granted rights to broadcast and syndicate the 2016 Stanley Cup Final. Kenny Albert would provide the play-by-play while Joe Micheletti would serve as color commentator. This was the first neutral national broadcast since the 2008 NHL Radio broadcast.

==== 2018 Winter Olympics ====
The NHL refused to allow players to compete at the 2018 Winter Olympics ice hockey tournament. Initially, in response to the NHL's decision, NBC elected not to air any NHL games during the three-week period on either the NBC broadcast network or NBCSN. However, NBC later relented and added three Sunday afternoon games in February as a lead-in to the Winter Olympics.

=== 2020s ===
On October 19, 2020, NBC's lead play-by-play announcer Mike Emrick announced his retirement from broadcasting. Emirck's final assignment for NBC was his call of Game 6 of the 2020 Stanley Cup Final. As he had been doing throughout the 2020 playoffs, the 74 year old Emrick called the Cup Final off monitors from his home studio in Metro Detroit, citing his advanced age as a potential risk for severe illness from COVID-19. Following Emrick's retirement, NBC did not name a presumptive lead play-by-play voice. Instead, they chose to rotate between John Forslund and Kenny Albert on the no. 1 team. On January 18, NBCSN aired a day-night quadruple-header on Martin Luther King Jr. Day, featuring Columbus at Detroit, Boston at New York Islanders, Buffalo at Philadelphia and Arizona at Vegas.

On the weekend of February 20–21, 2021, the NHL held two contests outdoors at Lake Tahoe. Coverage of the Saturday game between the Vegas Golden Knights and the Colorado Avalanche began on NBC. Play was suspended after the first period due to ice conditions caused by its exposure to heat and sunlight; the game was resumed at 9:02 p.m. PT (12:02 a.m. ET). It was moved to NBCSN due to the delay. As a result of the Sunday game between the Philadelphia Flyers and Boston Bruins being moved to a 7:30 p.m. ET start time, it too was moved from NBC to NBCSN (with an evening game between the New Jersey Devils and Washington Capitals swapped into NBC's afternoon window as a replacement). Mike Tirico provided the play-by-play commentary alongside Eddie Olczyk (analyst) and Brian Boucher ('Inside-the-Glass' reporter). Rutledge Wood, meanwhile, served as an on-site reporter in Lake Tahoe.

==== The end of The NHL on NBC ====
On January 22, 2021, an internal memo sent by NBC Sports president Pete Bevacqua announced that NBCSN would cease operations by the end of the year, and that USA Network would begin "carrying and/or simulcasting certain NBC Sports programming," including the Stanley Cup Playoffs and NASCAR races, before NBCSN's shutdown. Peacock, NBCUniversal's new streaming service, will also carry some of the network's former programming starting in 2022. The move was cited by industry analysts as a response to the impact of the COVID-19 pandemic on the sports and television industries, the acceleration of cord-cutting, as well as formidable competition from rival sports networks such as ESPN and Fox Sports 1.

With the NBC Sports contract expiring at the end of the 2020–21 season, the league explored the possibility of splitting its U.S. national media rights between multiple broadcasters, and over-the-top services (such as DAZN, ESPN+ or NBC's Peacock). In any case, the league aimed to surpass the US$2 billion total that NBC paid over the life of their 2011–12 to 2020–21 contract. On March 10, 2021, the NHL announced that ESPN would serve as one of the new rightsholders under a seven-year contract, which will include packages of at least 25 regular season games for ESPN and ABC (including opening night, the All-Star Game, Stadium Series and other special events), up to 75 original telecasts and all out-of-market games on ESPN+ (branded under NHL Power Play), rights to half of the Stanley Cup playoffs (including one conference final per-season), and four Stanley Cup Final over the length of the contract.

On April 26, 2021, Sports Business Journal reported that NBC had officially pulled out of bidding for future NHL rights, meaning that NBC will not televise NHL games for the first time since the 2004–05 NHL lockout. The next day, Turner Sports announced they agreed to a seven-year deal with the NHL to broadcast up to 72 games nationally on TNT and TBS (while also giving HBO Max the live streaming and simulcast rights to these games) beginning with the 2021–22 season, which will include three Stanley Cup Final, the other half of the Stanley Cup playoffs, the Winter Classic, and Heritage Classic.

Analysts believed once ESPN obtained not only more Stanley Cup Final (four out of three) than NBC desired but overall hockey content, it was not worth spending more money on a smaller package in contrast to what they were last paying the NHL. To put things into proper perspective, the secondary package that Turner Sports gained, was reportedly worth $225 million per year. NBCUniversal was at the time, paying the NHL roughly $300 million a year for exclusive rights fees. Combined with the approximately $400 million per year that the NHL was expected to receive from ESPN, the new rights fees were expected to be worth more than $625 million.

Ultimately, NBC's final NHL broadcast was Game 5 of the 2021 Stanley Cup Final at Amalie Arena on July 7. There, the Tampa Bay Lightning defeated the Montreal Canadiens by a score of 1–0 to win their second consecutive Stanley Cup.

This is our last game...on NBC, and I would like to thank...our entire family...at NBC. All the people behind the scenes. It's been an honor to be a part of this team for the last 15 and a half years. Thank them all.

— Eddie Olczyk's final remarks during NBC's last NHL broadcast on July 7, 2021.

A huge thank you to all who have been a part of it. Hall of Famer Doc Emrick, the best analysts in the business, Winter Classics, every playoff game televised, the introduction of the "Inside the Glass" position thanks to our great leader, Sam Flood, and Pierre. Our tremendous production crew, led by Matt Marvin, Charlie Dammeyer, Steve Greenberg, Jenny Glazer, and so many others. Coordinating producer John McGuinness, Ben Bouma by our side here in the broadcast booth. And of course...the viewers across North America...it has been an honor. Postgame coverage will continue, including celebrations, interviews, and more...on NHL Overtime, which begins shortly on NBCSN. Andrei Vasilevskiy and the Tampa Bay Lightning have won...their second straight Stanley Cup. For Eddie Olczyk, Brian Boucher, and our entire crew, I'm Kenny Albert. So long from Tampa!

— Kenny Albert signing off at the end of NBC's final NHL broadcast, Game 5 of the 2021 Stanley Cup Final.

After the end of the subsequent postgame coverage on NBCSN, the network aired a 13-minute video montage, narrated by long-time lead play-by-play voice Mike Emrick (who had taken the role as a contributor in the final NHL on NBC season), discussing various innovations that NBC had brought to its NHL coverage over the past 15 seasons, highlights, and human interest stories that had occurred along the way as well. At the end of the video, Emrick signed off for NBC's coverage with the following:

Handshake lines close off any Stanley Cup year. We have shown you 16 of these, and 16 teams clustered together for one last picture. Teams, exhausted but victorious. Teams. Perhaps in your own life, you have been on a team of people for some time and then seen it come to an end. If so, you will understand how it is with us as we close our time with the NHL on NBC. One of God's greatest gifts is that of memory. One of mankind's greatest gifts is video. As we have watched this last video with you, and now carry away our own memories, we are sad for ourselves, but grateful for your loyalty to this wonderful sport, and also grateful as we say to for this final time — "thank you". Thank you for watching the Stanley Cup playoffs on NBC.

— Mike Emrick signing off for the NHL on NBC at the end of its Game 5, 2021 Stanley Cup Final postgame coverage on NBCSN.

Eddie Olczyk missed game two of the 2021 Stanley Cup Final due to a personal matter, so "Inside-the-Glass" reporter Brian Boucher moved to the booth with Albert, and Pierre McGuire took over for Boucher between the benches. McGuire also called Game 3 of this series with Albert and Olczyk because Boucher missed it for the same reason.

In all, NBC averaged 2.52 million viewers for the 2021 Stanley Cup Final. The fifth and ultimately decisive game meanwhile, garnered approximately 3.6 million viewers for NBC.

==== Aftermath ====
Following the conclusion of the 2021 Stanley Cup Final, Kenny Albert and Eddie Olczyk moved over to TNT Sports, Turner Sports at the time, to serve as their lead broadcast team. Olczyk's deal also allowed him to stay with NBC for its horse racing coverage. Also moving over from NBC to TNT were play-by-play announcer Brendan Burke, studio host Liam McHugh and studio analysts Anson Carter and Keith Jones.

"Inside the Glass" reporter Pierre McGuire, meanwhile, was hired by the Ottawa Senators to serve as the team's senior vice-president of player development on July 12, 2021, but was fired after one season. Secondary play-by-play announcer John Forslund moved on to become the television play-by-play broadcaster on Root Sports Northwest for the Seattle Kraken ahead of their inaugural NHL season in fall 2021. Forslund later joined TNT in a fill-in role. Other notable former NBC personalities that had subsequently joined TNT include play-by-play announcer Alex Faust, studio personalities Kathryn Tappen and Patrick Sharp and former "Inside the Glass" analyst Darren Pang.

"Inside the Glass" reporter and studio analyst Brian Boucher joined ESPN/ABC for its NHL coverage as its co-lead color commentator. Joining Boucher were analysts A. J. Mleczko, Ryan Callahan, and Dominic Moore. Also joining ESPN/ABC was former analyst Ray Ferraro, who joined in the same role as Boucher and was later promoted to lead color commentator after Boucher left ESPN (see below). Boucher and Moore both left ESPN after the 2022-23 season, with the former joining TNT to replace Keith Jones, who became President of hockey operations for the Philadelphia Flyers. Callahan later left ESPN/ABC following the 2024–25 season to spend more time with family.

The "Inside the Glass" position was adapted by NBC for its NBA coverage when it resumed airing games there in 2025. The Monday-night games on Peacock feature an "On the Bench" commentary setup in which the two analysts are positioned behind each team's bench with access to their respective assistant coaches. On November 17, NBC relaunched NBCSN as a primary outlet to broadcast most Peacock-exclusive events including the NBA.

Several of NBC's former NHL broadcasters have continued to cover hockey during the Winter Olympics, which have aired on the network since 2002. Commentators and studio hosts who returned for the 2022 and 2026 competitions include Albert, Burke, Olczyk, Boucher, Mleczko, Carter, and Tappen. The NHL on NBC theme music was also brought back as intermission report-based "bumper music" for the 2026 Olympic tournament, coinciding with NHL players returning to the Games for the first time since 2014.

== NHL coverage on NBC owned-and-operated television stations ==
=== NBC stations and affiliates ===
Team	Stations	Years
Colorado Avalanche	KUSA (Note: Owned by Tegna. Games are produced by Altitude Sports.)	2024–present
New York Rangers	W2XBS (later WNBC); WNBT 4 (later WNBC)	1940–1941; 1941–1942; 1945–1946

=== NBC Sports Regional Networks ===
==== Current ====
Name	Region served	NHL team rights	Notes
NBC Sports California (Note: Originally launching as Comcast SportsNet West, the channel was renamed Comcast SportsNet California on September 4, 2008. It was then renamed NBC Sports California on April 2, 2017.)	Northern and central California	San Jose Sharks	Created in 2008, in conjunction with Maloof Sports & Entertainment (owners of the Kings and Monarchs), after the company did not renew their television contract with FSN Bay Area.
NBC Sports Philadelphia (Note: Originally a joint venture between Comcast, the Philadelphia Phillies Major League Baseball franchise and Spectacor (owner of the Flyers and the NBA's Philadelphia 76ers), controlling interest in Spectacor was acquired by Comcast in 1996. Due to its use of the microwave and fiber optic relay infrastructure previously used by PRISM, Comcast SportsNet Philadelphia was legally exempt from requirements to offer its programming to satellite providers until the Federal Communications Commission closed the terrestrial loophole in 2010. Despite this and FCC directives included in the approval for the NBC purchase, Comcast continues to refuse to distribute the channel to satellite providers DirecTV and Dish Network. Formerly known as Comcast SportsNet Philadelphia from 1996 to 2017.)	Philadelphia, eastern Pennsylvania, Delaware, southern and central New Jersey	Philadelphia Flyers	Channel serves as flagship of the Comcast SportsNet. Replaced PRISM and SportsChannel Philadelphia as the local broadcaster of the Flyers in 1997.

==== Former ====
Name	Region served	NHL team rights	Notes
NBC Sports Chicago (Note: Formerly known as Comcast SportsNet Chicago from 2004 to 2017.)	Illinois, northwestern Indiana, Iowa, non-Milwaukee market areas of southern Wisconsin	Chicago Blackhawks	NBC owned 20% of this joint venture with the Bulls, Blackhawks, White Sox, and Cubs (who own 20% each themselves). It shut down in October 2024 and be replaced with Chicago Sports Network.
NBC Sports Northwest (Note: NBC Sports Northwest is currently available mainly on Comcast systems in the Pacific Northwest, and is not available on Dish Network and DirecTV. Formerly known as Comcast SportsNet Northwest from 2007 to 2017.)	Oregon and Washington	Vancouver Canucks	NBC Sports Northwest ceased operations in September 2021 after losing the rights to the Portland Trail Blazers NBA team to Root Sports Northwest. That same month, the Seattle Kraken officially joined the NHL, and Canucks games ceased to air in the Washington and Oregon areas.
NBC Sports Washington (Note: Formerly known as Home Team Sports from 1981 to 2001, and later Comcast SportsNet Mid-Atlantic from 2001 to 2017.)	Delaware, Maryland, south-central Pennsylvania, Virginia, Washington, D.C., West Virginia	Washington Capitals	Ended affiliation with Comcast in 2022 after Monumental Sports & Entertainment acquired full control of the network, though it continued to operate under the NBC Sports Washington name until the end of the 2022–23 season. The network rebranded to Monumental Sports Network in September 2023.

== Notes ==
Records
Preceded by None	NHL network broadcast partner in the United States; 1965–1966	Succeeded by CBS
Preceded by CBS	NHL network broadcast partner in the United States; 1972–1975	Succeeded by NHL Network
Preceded by CBS (in 1980)	NHL network broadcast partner in the United States; 1990–1994 with ABC (1992–1994)	Succeeded by Fox
Preceded by ABC	NHL network broadcast partner in the United States; 2005–2021	Succeeded by ABC
Preceded by ESPN	NHL pay television carrier in the United States; 2005–2021 as NHL on OLN (2005–2006) as NHL on Versus (2006–2011)	Succeeded by ESPN and TNT
