= NHL Network (American TV channel) =

American television sports channel

- Country: United States
- Broadcast area: United States
- Headquarters: Secaucus, New Jersey, U.S.

Programming
- Language: English
- Picture format: 720p (HDTV); 480i (SDTV)

Ownership
- Owner: National Hockey League (84.4%); NBCUniversal (15.6%)
- Sister channels: MLB Network

History
- Launched: October 1, 2007; 19 years ago

Links
- Website: nhl.com/nhl-network

Availability

Streaming media
- DirecTV Stream: Internet Protocol Television
- Sling TV: Internet Protocol Television
- FuboTV: Internet Protocol Television

NHL Network is an American sports-oriented cable and satellite television network owned as a joint venture between the National Hockey League (NHL), which owns a controlling 84.4% interest, and NBCUniversal, which owns the remaining 15.6%. Dedicated to providing broadcast coverage of ice hockey, the network features live game telecasts from the NHL and other professional and collegiate hockey leagues, as well as NHL-related content including analysis programs, specials and documentaries.

== History ==
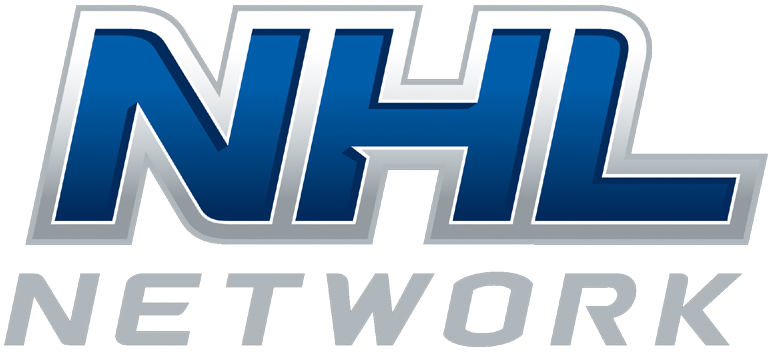
The network's logo used from 2009 to 2011

Launched on October 1, 2007, the NHL Network was developed out of a joint venture between the NHL and cable provider Comcast, as part of a broadcast rights agreement that resulted in the NBC Sports Network (then known as Versus) acquiring partial cable television rights to regular season, and Stanley Cup playoff and finals games from the National Hockey League. It became the third sports-oriented cable network devoted to programming from and controlled by one of the Major professional sports leagues in the United States and Canada, following the National Basketball Association-owned NBA TV (which launched in March 1999) and the National Football League-owned NFL Network (which launched in November 2003); Major League Baseball would launch its own sports channel, MLB Network, on January 1, 2009.

On June 1, 2015, The Globe and Mail columnist David Shoalts reported that NHL Network in Canada would cease operations on September 1, 2015; national media rights to the NHL in Canada had been acquired by Rogers Communications beginning in the 2014–15 season, and the Bell Media employees who managed the network's Canadian arm on behalf of the NHL were laid off that July.

In August 2015, it was announced that the NHL had reached a six-year deal with Major League Baseball Advanced Media (MLBAM) to take over the management of the NHL's digital properties, as well as NHL Network. Operations and production of NHL Network's programming was shifted from Toronto to the Secaucus, New Jersey facilities of MLB Network. There has been minor talent sharing between the networks, and MLB Network cross-promoted an NHL Stadium Series game at Coors Field by building a scale hockey rink in its Studio 42 (which itself is designed to resemble a scaled baseball field).

For much of the 2015–16 season, NHL Network studio programs originated from MLB Network's Studio 21 and Studio K, enabled by a lack of major overlap between the two leagues' regular seasons. In April 2016, coinciding with the start of the playoffs, NHL Network moved to a permanent 1,200 square-foot studio near Studio 21 known as "The Rink".

The network continues to operate under the league's new television contract consortium of ESPN and Turner Sports beginning with the 2021–22 season, continuing to air regional games and the NHL Network Showcase package.

== Carriage agreements ==
Comcast, owners of the league's former cable partner NBCSN, is also the largest cable television provider in the United States. The company was contractually obligated to carry NHL Network on its systems by the summer of 2007 at the latest, so it would be available in time for the 2007–08 NHL season. Both Comcast and the NHL had an option to terminate their contract after the 2006–07 season, which would have voided Comcast's obligation to launch a U.S. version of NHL Network, but opted to proceed with the launch.

Since its official launch in the United States, the NHL Network announced on October 8, 2007 that it would begin being carried that month on Cablevision, Charter, Cox Communications, DirecTV, Dish Network, Xfinity and Time Warner Cable through carriage agreements that were struck with each of the providers. DirecTV has aired NHL Network on channel 215 since October 31, 2007.

NHL.com announced on January 12, 2009 that AT&T U-verse would begin carrying the channel. This was followed on June 2, 2009 with the announcement that NHL Network and Comcast had reached an agreement to carry the channel on the provider's Digital Classic Tier, which increased subscribership of the channel from the then-estimated two million subscribers in its placement on the "Sports Entertainment" tier to over 10 million on its Digital Classic package.

In 2016, Sling TV became the first over-the-top media service to offer NHL Network.

In 2020, Fubo added NHL Networks to its programming.

=== Carriage disputes ===
In 2011, AT&T U-verse refused to carry NHL Network over a planned increase in retransmission payments.

== Programming ==
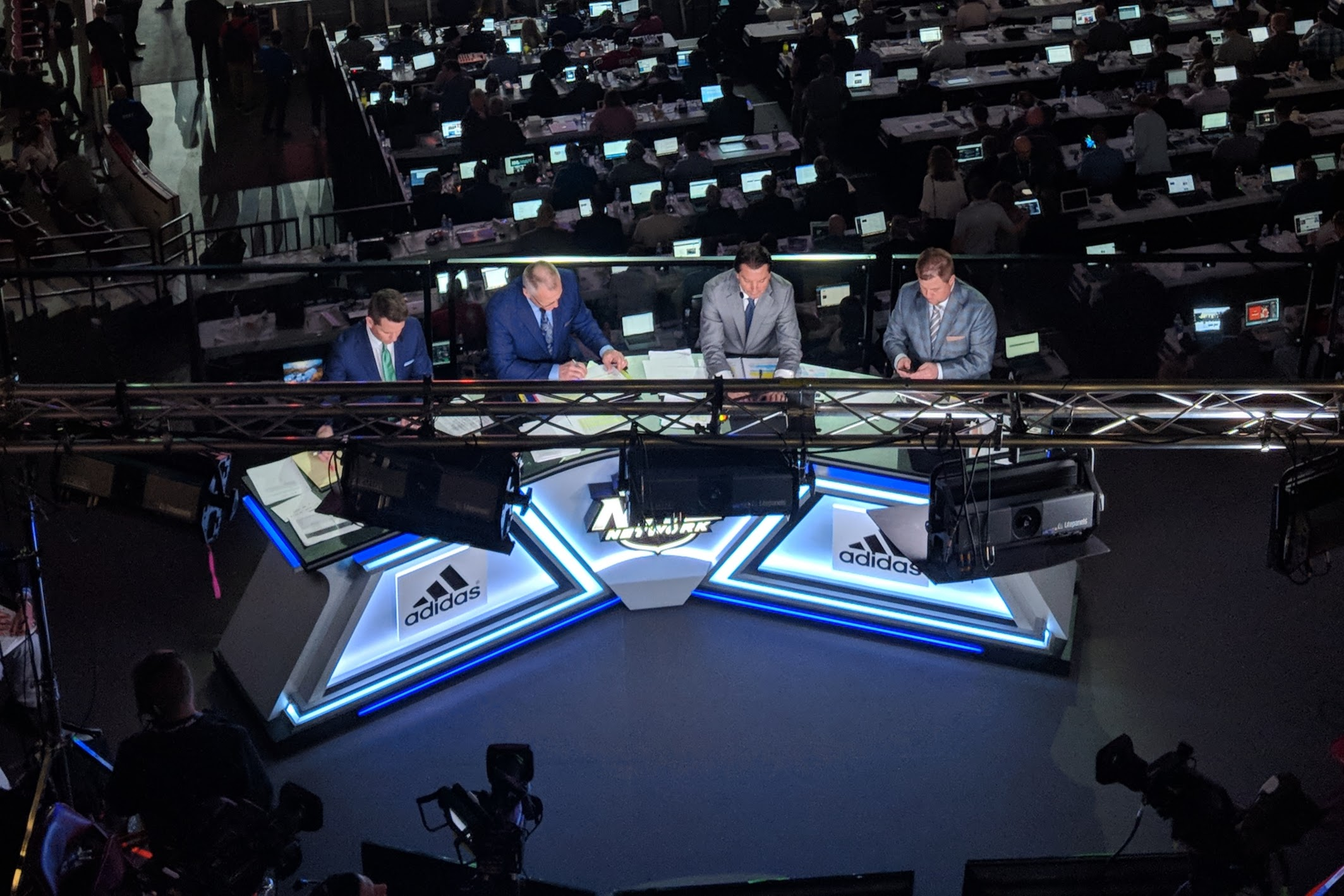
The NHL Network's broadcast set at the 2019 NHL entry draft in Vancouver

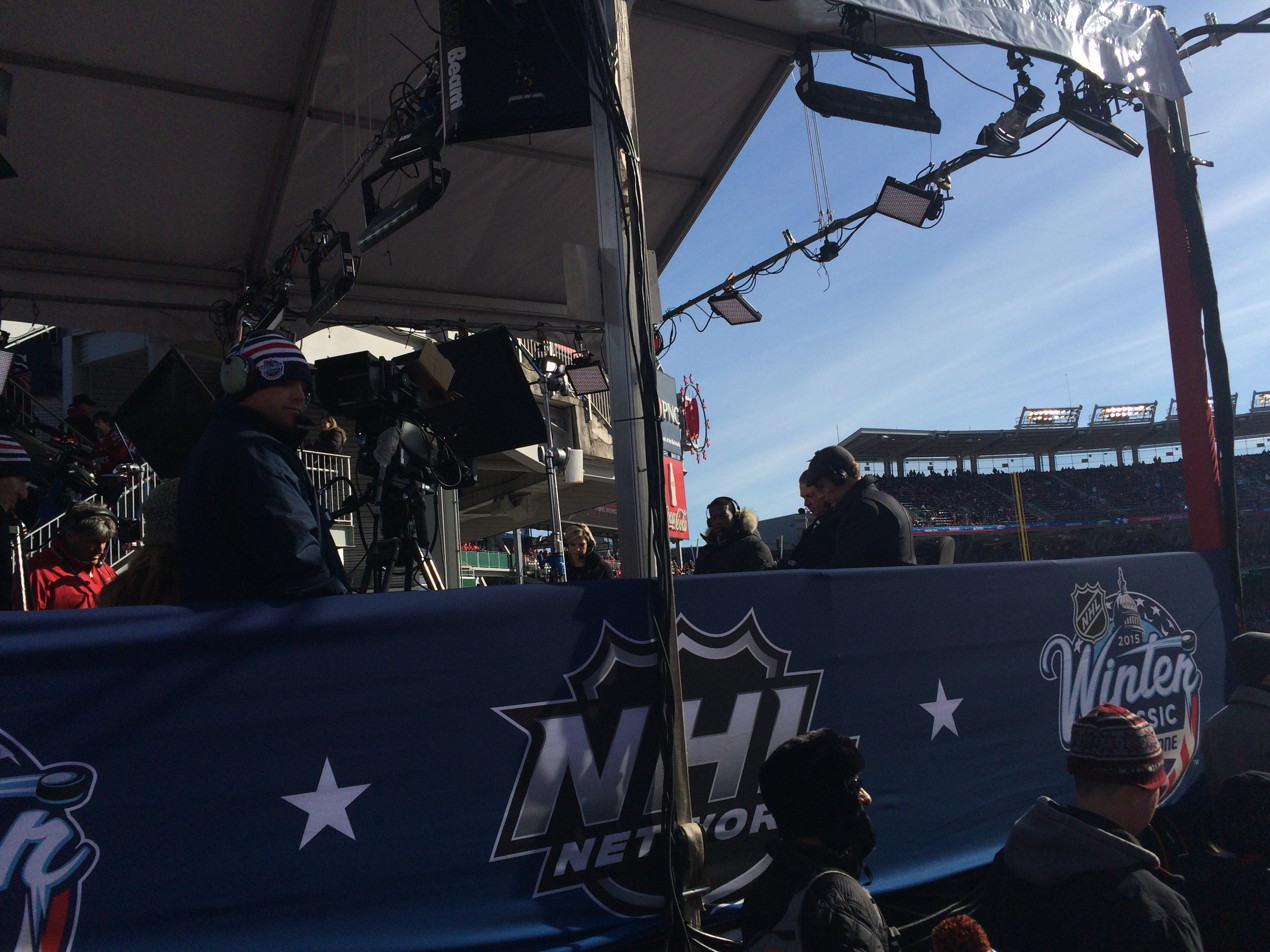
The NHL Network's broadcast set at the 2015 NHL Winter Classic in Washington, D.C.

=== Hockey telecasts ===
The NHL Network originally shared some programming with its now-defunct sister network in Canada, with the main differences in programming between the two networks being the carriage of domestically targeted commercials and live game telecasts. For those live NHL games aired throughout the season, they are primarily simulcasts of feeds from one of the team's regional rightsholders or Canadian national rightsholder Sportsnet, including CBC-aired Hockey Night in Canada coverage on Saturday evenings. The network's first ever simulcast of the program was on October 4, 2008 with an afternoon doubleheader, from Europe, with Rangers-Lightning from Prague at 12 ET and Penguins-Senators from Stockholm at 2:30 ET. The first main CBC-simulcast was with Montreal-Toronto [featuring updates from Detroit-Ottawa; also shown on NHL Center Ice (along with its canadian counterpart)/the streaming website for CBC Sports/CBC-Ottawa Valley (with the Toronto game airing on NHL Centre Ice in that region)] followed by Vancouver-Calgary. Occasionally, whenever an American team is featured, the network can offer viewers with an alternate game (only offered when their local team is included in the main one; if a game features an all-Canadian matchup, there is no backup game). In 2021, the network introduced its first original broadcasts, the NHL Network Showcase, which is modeled after MLB Network's MLB Network Showcase, and air on weekend afternoons.

NHL Network also carried selected first round games during the Stanley Cup playoffs (select second round games until NBCUniversal the 2010-11 season made them exclusive [excluding the Montreal-Winnipeg matchup in 2021) until the 2021-22 season, when all playoff games were split between ESPN and TNT.

NHL Network has also aired other hockey leagues and events, such as the American Hockey League (along with simulcasting games also airing over on CBC in Canada, college hockey, and as official U.S. broadcaster for such IIHF events like the IIHF World Junior Championship.

It is also the producer of the NHL International television service providing a global feed (both TV and online) for the All Star Game and the Stanley Cup Final.

=== Other programs ===
- NHL Tonight (formerly NHL on the Fly) – NHL Network's signature show, which covers on- and off-ice NHL news with highlights, interviews and analysis.
- NHL Now – A program that features interviews with NHL players and insight from NHL insiders. The program also shows viewers voicing their opinions from social media on noteworthy news from the day.
- On the Fly – A program featuring highlights of the day's games; its current format is modeled after MLB Network's Quick Pitch.
- Top 10 – A countdown program focusing on hockey-related topics, from great performances to memorable moments.
- Frozen in Time – A retrospective program that features a look back at the greatest moments in the NHL from players, teams, and special events.
- Classic Series – A collection of highlights from a past Stanley Cup Playoff series.
- Vintage Games – NHL Network airs archived broadcasts of past NHL games in their entirety from the game's original broadcaster.
- Pioneers – A profile series in which NHL legends discuss their groundbreaking careers.
- Rink Reels – A movie program that airs hockey-related theatrical films.
- NHL Network also has the right to air various Stanley Cup films from the winning teams from different years.
- NHL Network Ice Time - A series designed for young people on the sport of hockey featuring instructions on the game and interviews with NHL Players and is hosted by Jackie Redmond.
- Breakdowns and Demos - A series featuring clips from NHL Tonight and On the Fly that go in-depth of the plays and players that make the NHL go.
- Hockeyverse Matchup of the Week — A youth-oriented program featuring highlights of a game rendered with 3D animated avatars using player and puck tracking.
- Raising the Cup - In the summer of 2010, the network televised 35 Cup-clinching games dating from 1975 to 2010.
- NHL Tonight: First Shift - A daily show presented by E.J. Hradek airing weekdays at 4pm, Also broadcast as an audio-only podcast

== On-air staff ==
Current on-air talent includes:

- Bruce Boudreau - studio analyst
- Brian Boyle - studio analyst
- Jamison Coyle - studio host
- Jackie Redmond - reporter
- Ken Daneyko - studio analyst
- Jason Demers - studio analyst
- Devan Dubnyk - studio analyst
- Elliotte Friedman - network insider
- Lauren Gardner - studio host and reporter
- Steve Gelbs - studio host
- Stu Grimson - studio analyst
- E.J. Hradek - studio host
- Thomas Hickey - studio analyst
- Billy Jaffe - studio analyst
- Mike Johnson - studio analyst
- Mike Kelly - network insider
- Steve Konroyd - studio analyst
- Alexa Landestoy - studio host
- Bill Lindsay - studio analyst
- Tony Luftman - studio host
- Pat Maroon - studio analyst
- Dave Pagnotta - network insider
- Mark Parrish - studio analyst
- Dave Reid - studio analyst
- Mike Rupp - studio analyst
- Siera Santos - studio host
- Cory Schneider - studio analyst
- Devante Smith-Pelly - studio analyst
- Kathryn Tappen - studio host
- Nate Thompson - studio analyst
- Adnan Virk - studio host
- Erika Wachter - studio host
- Kevin Weekes - studio analyst
