= Dave Reid (ice hockey, born 1964) =

Canadian former ice hockey left winger (born 1964)

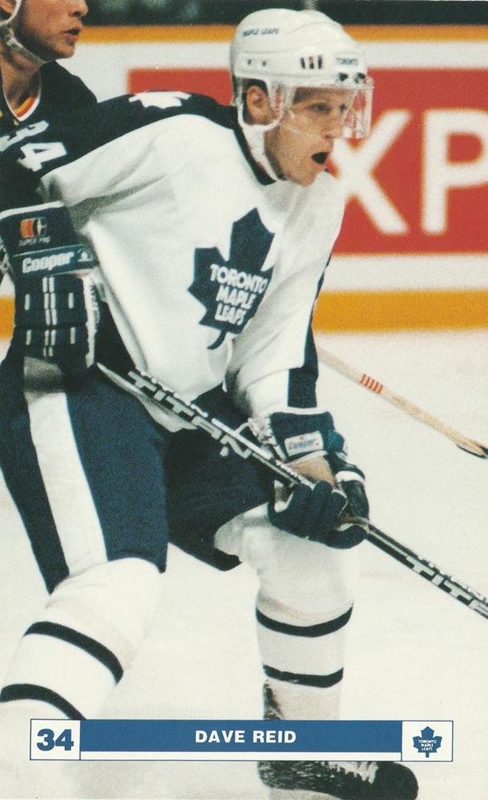
- Born: May 15, 1964 (age 62) Etobicoke, Ontario, Canada
- Height: 6 ft 0 in (183 cm)
- Weight: 205 lb (93 kg; 14 st 9 lb)
- Position: Left wing
- Shot: Left
- Played for: Boston Bruins; Toronto Maple Leafs; Dallas Stars; Colorado Avalanche
- NHL draft: 60th overall, 1982; Boston Bruins
- Playing career: 1984–2001

David William Reid (born May 15, 1964) is a Canadian former ice hockey left winger. He played in the National Hockey League with the Boston Bruins, Toronto Maple Leafs, Dallas Stars and the Colorado Avalanche.

== Playing career ==
Selected in the 1982 NHL entry draft by the Boston Bruins, Reid spent his first few seasons between the parent club and the minors. In 1988, he signed as a free agent with the Toronto Maple Leafs. After three seasons in Toronto, he returned to Boston where he would play for the next five seasons.

Reid signed with the Dallas Stars in 1996, and in 1999, he helped the Stars win their first Stanley Cup. Reid scored a personal best 10 playoff points while skating on a line with Jamie Langenbrunner and Joe Nieuwendyk. Reid would move on and sign with the Colorado Avalanche after the season, where he would play for the last two years of his NHL career. In 2001, he added a second Stanley Cup to his resume while with the Avalanche.

In 961 NHL games, Reid scored 165 goals and 204 assists for a total of 369 points.

Over his career, Reid provided depth scoring and was effective penalty killer. For the 1990-91 NHL season, he led the league and tied a Maple Leafs team record with 8 shorthanded goals. Reid placed in the top 5 in 3 other seasons, finishing his career with 28 shorthanded goals.

== Post-retirement ==
Since retirement, Reid has moved into the field of broadcasting. He is frequently seen as one of several rotating analysts on the NHL Network's nightly "NHL On The Fly" television program. He was also the colour commentator for the gold medal game of the 2009 World U-17 Hockey Challenge on TSN in Port Alberni.

On May 4, 2010, Reid was hired as the General Manager of the OHL's Peterborough Petes. The team failed to make the playoffs in either 2011 or 2012, and, after a slow start to the 2012–13 season, he was fired on October 9, 2012. Reid currently serves as an analyst for NHL Network & TSN.

== Career statistics ==
			Regular season					Playoffs
Season	Team	League	GP	G	A	Pts	PIM	GP	G	A	Pts	PIM
1981–82	Peterborough Petes	OHL	68	10	32	42	41	9	2	3	5	11
1982–83	Peterborough Petes	OHL	70	23	34	57	33	4	3	1	4	0
1983–84	Peterborough Petes	OHL	60	33	64	97	12	8	7	2	9	12
1983–84	Boston Bruins	NHL	8	1	0	1	2	—	—	—	—	—
1984–85	Hershey Bears	AHL	43	10	14	24	6	—	—	—	—	—
1984–85	Boston Bruins	NHL	35	14	13	27	27	5	1	0	1	0
1985–86	Moncton Golden Flames	AHL	26	14	18	32	4	—	—	—	—	—
1985–86	Boston Bruins	NHL	37	10	10	20	10	—	—	—	—	—
1986–87	Moncton Golden Flames	AHL	40	12	22	34	23	5	1	0	1	0
1986–87	Boston Bruins	NHL	12	3	3	6	0	2	0	0	0	0
1987–88	Maine Mariners	AHL	63	21	37	58	40	10	6	7	13	0
1987–88	Boston Bruins	NHL	3	0	0	0	0	—	—	—	—	—
1988–89	Toronto Maple Leafs	NHL	77	9	21	30	22	—	—	—	—	—
1989–90	Toronto Maple Leafs	NHL	70	9	19	28	9	3	0	0	0	0
1990–91	Toronto Maple Leafs	NHL	69	15	13	28	18	—	—	—	—	—
1991–92	Maine Mariners	AHL	12	1	5	6	4	—	—	—	—	—
1991–92	Boston Bruins	NHL	43	7	7	14	27	15	2	5	7	4
1992–93	Boston Bruins	NHL	65	20	16	36	10	—	—	—	—	—
1993–94	Boston Bruins	NHL	83	6	17	23	25	13	2	1	3	2
1994–95	Providence Bruins	AHL	7	3	0	3	0	—	—	—	—	—
1994–95	Boston Bruins	NHL	38	5	5	10	10	5	0	0	0	0
1995–96	Boston Bruins	NHL	63	23	21	44	4	5	0	2	2	2
1996–97	Dallas Stars	NHL	82	19	20	39	10	7	1	0	1	4
1997–98	Dallas Stars	NHL	65	6	12	18	14	5	0	3	3	2
1998–99	Dallas Stars	NHL	73	6	11	17	16	23	2	8	10	14
1999–2000	Colorado Avalanche	NHL	65	11	7	18	28	17	1	3	4	0
2000–01	Colorado Avalanche	NHL	73	1	9	10	21	18	0	4	4	6
NHL totals			961	165	204	369	253	118	9	26	35	34

== Awards and honors ==
Award	Year	Ref
Stanley Cup champion	1999, 2001	
