= Kevin Weekes =

Canadian ice hockey player (born 1975)

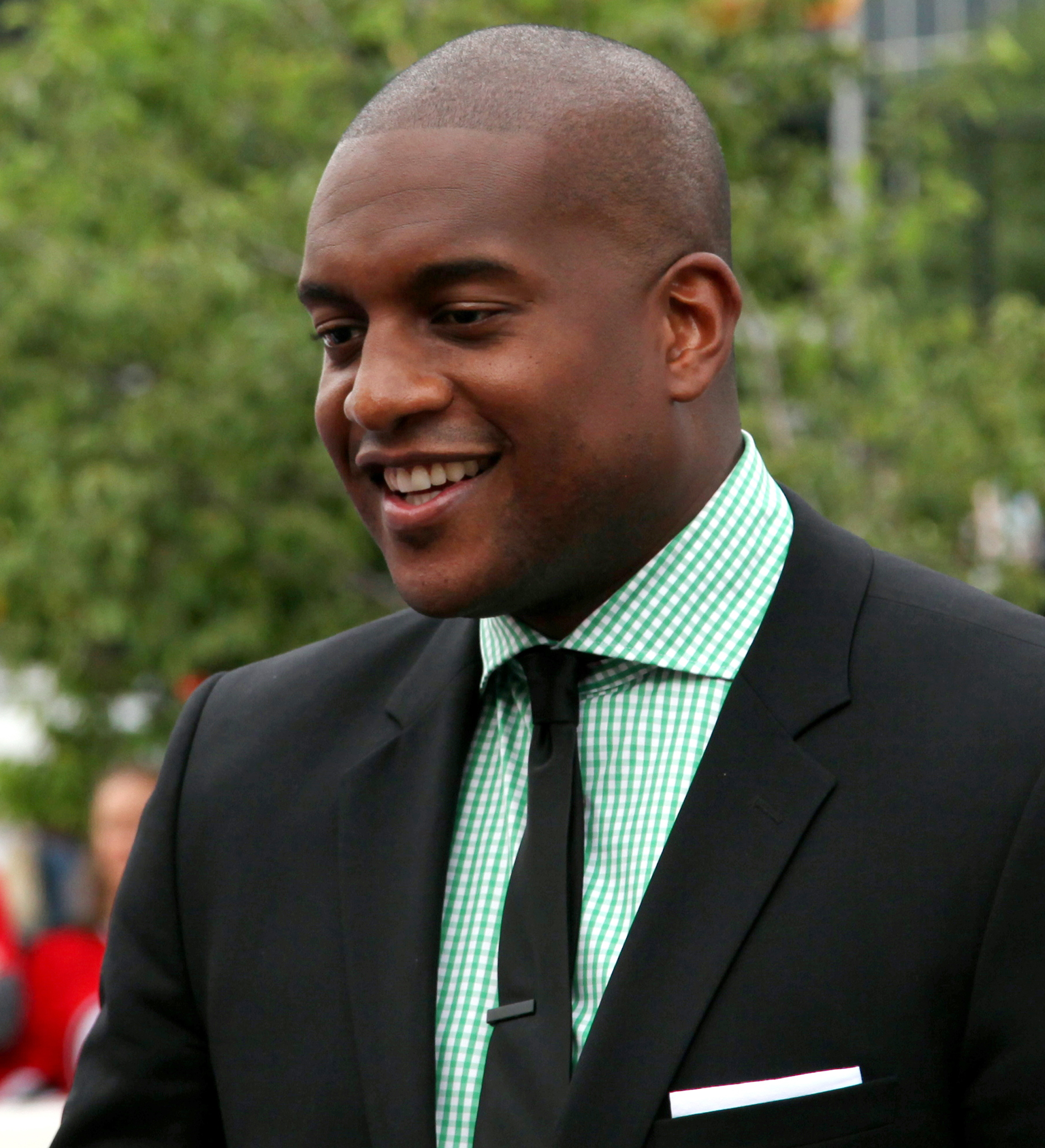
- Weekes in 2012
- Born: April 4, 1975 (age 51) Toronto, Ontario, Canada
- Height: 6 ft 1 in (185 cm)
- Weight: 235 lb (107 kg; 16 st 11 lb)
- Position: Goaltender
- Caught: Left
- Played for: Florida Panthers; Vancouver Canucks; New York Islanders; Tampa Bay Lightning; Carolina Hurricanes; New York Rangers; New Jersey Devils
- NHL draft: 41st overall, 1993; Florida Panthers
- Playing career: 1995–2009

Kevin Weekes (born April 4, 1975) is a Canadian former professional ice hockey goaltender who played 348 games in the National Hockey League (NHL). He is now a studio analyst for NHL Network, appearing on shows like On the Fly and NHL Tonight, while also calling weekly showcase games. He also calls games on ESPN/ABC, and makes regular studio appearances during games and on ESPN's weekly hockey show, The Point.

== Playing career ==
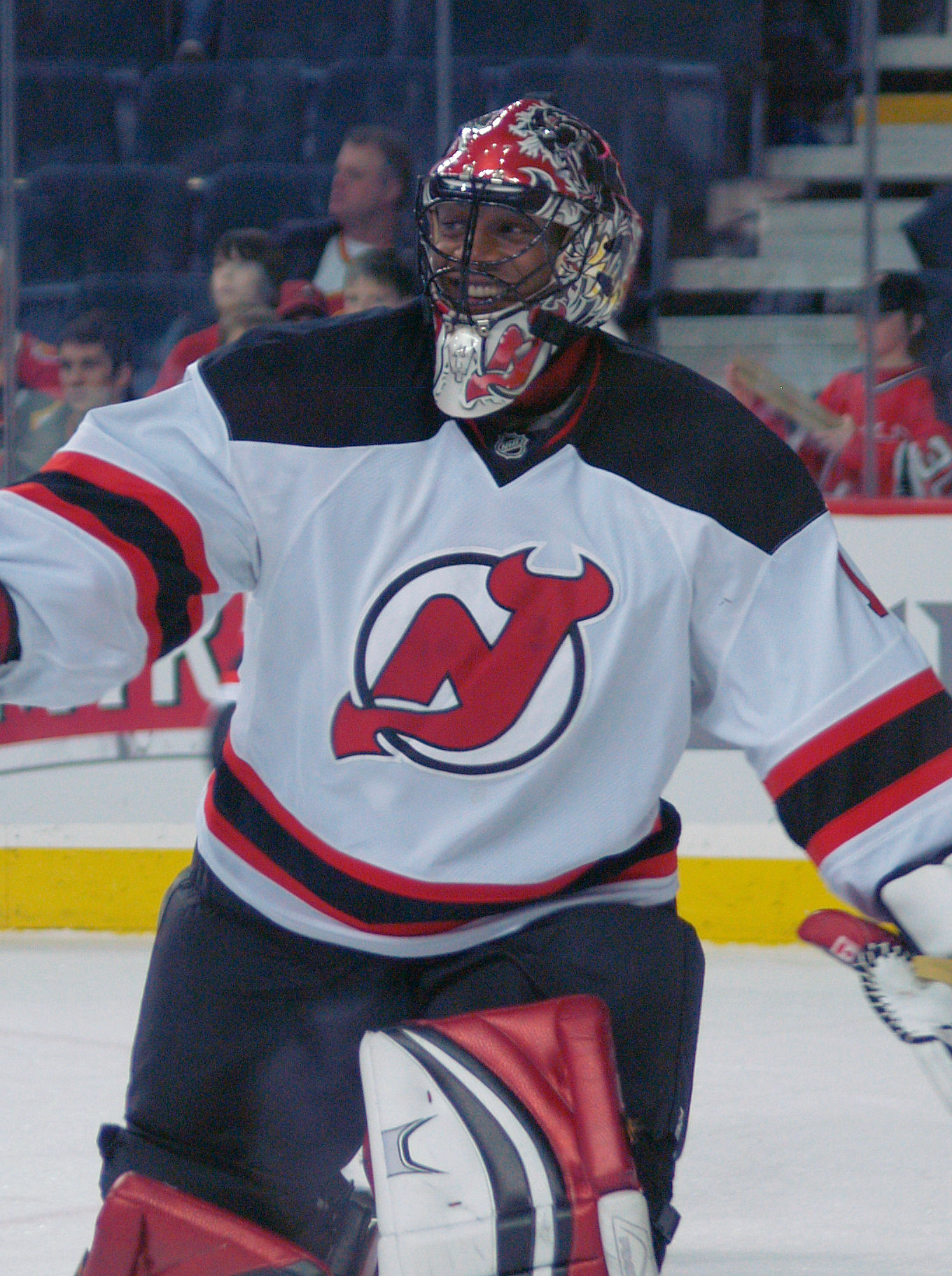
Weekes with the New Jersey Devils

As a youth, Weekes played in the 1989 Quebec International Pee-Wee Hockey Tournament with the Toronto Red Wings minor ice hockey team.

Weekes' career began with the Owen Sound Platers of the Ontario Hockey League. He also had a brief stint with the Ottawa 67's.

He was chosen 41st overall by the Florida Panthers in the 1993 NHL entry draft. In 1996, while playing for the Panthers' American Hockey League (AHL) affiliate, the Carolina Monarchs, Weekes was loaned to the Rochester Americans to participate in the 1996 Spengler Cup competition and was named MVP of the tournament. He made his NHL debut with the Panthers on October 16, 1997, going 0–5–1 in 11 appearances for the Panthers. The following summer he was traded to the Vancouver Canucks in a trade for Pavel Bure and compiled a 6–15–5 record in 31 appearances over a season and a half before being traded to the New York Islanders halfway through the 1999–2000 season. At the conclusion of that season he was traded to the Tampa Bay Lightning, where he played until late in the 2001–02 season.

The Carolina Hurricanes acquired Weekes on March 5, 2002 for Chris Dingman and Shane Willis. Weekes essentially served as a backup to Arturs Irbe during the remainder of the regular season, only playing in two of the final seventeen games for the Hurricanes. During the playoffs, Weekes played an important part in the Hurricanes run to the 2002 Stanley Cup Finals. Weekes played in eight games during the 2002 playoffs, including relieving Irbe in a first round, game four loss against the New Jersey Devils, and starting in goal during the critical games five and six of that series; which the Hurricanes won four games to two. Weekes also started games one, two and three of the second round against the Montreal Canadiens before being replaced by Irbe. During the playoffs, Weekes recorded back to back shutouts, with a 32 save shutout in game six of the first round against the New Jersey Devils and a 25 save shutout in game one of the second round against the Montreal Canadiens.

Weekes was the primary goaltender for the Hurricanes during the 2002–03 season playing in 51 games and compiling a 14–24–9 record and was the primary goaltender for the Hurricanes in 2003-04 playing in 66 games compiling a 23–30–11 record.

Weekes signed with the New York Rangers as a free agent prior to the 2004–05 NHL lock-out, winning his first start with the Rangers on October 5, 2005 in a game against the Philadelphia Flyers. His time with the Rangers looked to be promising until an injury kept him out and he lost his number one spot to Henrik Lundqvist. Lundqvist came in to play in place of Weekes and played exceptionally well. Weekes remained in good spirits upon his healthy return to the team even though he had been bumped to the number two spot and back up to the rookie Lundqvist. He became an unrestricted free agent following a less-than-stellar 2006–07 season.

On July 5, 2007 he signed with the New Jersey Devils to serve as a backup to All-Star Martin Brodeur. In the 2008–09 season, Brodeur suffered an injury which sidelined him for almost the entire season. This left Weekes and Scott Clemmensen battling for the number one spot. Brodeur returned, Weekes remained as the backup and Clemmensen was sent back down to the AHL. Weekes was injured in a game on 3 April 2009. Clemmensen took over as the backup to Brodeur. The Devils made the playoffs, but lost to the Carolina Hurricanes in Game 7 of the Eastern Conference Quarterfinals.

Weekes announced his retirement from playing on September 27, 2009.

== Broadcasting career ==
Weekes made history in 2009, when he became the first black analyst in ice hockey. Weekes provides colour commentary for NHL games on the NHL Network and Hockey Night in Canada. In The Hockey News 2011 edition of the 100 Most Powerful people in ice hockey, Weekes was considered one of the Top 40 under the age of 40.

In 2021, Weekes made his debut as an analyst for the NHL on ESPN. He appeared during ESPN coverage of the 2021 NHL expansion draft and the 2021 NHL draft.

During the 2022 NHL trade deadline, Weekes became a social media darling when he started reporting on trades on video from odd places. Although he started off posting simple selfie videos from normal locations, he quickly started adding more substance, such as reporting from a barber's chair, or with the New York City skyline in the background. Many fans started create memes, manipulating the background so that it would seem that Weekes would report on different crazy locations, such as space and various world landmarks, and even some fictional locale. As the deadline went on, Weekes continued to lean into the bit, even reporting a trade with a small trash bin on his head, obscuring his head. Since the viral deadline, Weekes has continued making such videos.

== Personal life ==
Weekes was born in Toronto, Ontario and went to Dr. Norman Bethune Collegiate Institute. His parents had emigrated from Barbados to Canada.

The reason that Weekes sometimes wore jersey number 80 was that he wanted to wear 00 but the NHL does not allow a player to wear single or double zero jerseys. So Weekes chose the number that most closely resembled 00. Upon signing with the New Jersey Devils, as a result of former general manager Lou Lamoriello's policy of wearing jerseys 1–40 with exception of marquee players, Weekes was given jersey number 1. Weekes wore 00 in junior hockey when he played for the Ottawa 67's. He also wore 00 as a member of the Carolina Monarchs in the AHL. He was also featured as a columnist periodically with the Greensboro News and Record during his time with the Monarchs. Weekes appeared on both the soap operas All My Children and One Life to Live making cameo appearances. Weekes and Willie O'Ree appeared in the Everybody Hates Chris episode "Everybody Hates Gretzky" in 2008.

In February 2023, Weekes became an American citizen.

== Career statistics ==
			Regular season										Playoffs
Season	Team	League	GP	W	L	T	OTL	MIN	GA	SO	GAA	SV%	GP	W	L	MIN	GA	SO	GAA	SV%
1990–91	Toronto Red Wings	MTHL	—	—	—	—	—	—	—	—	—	—	—	—	—	—	—	—	—	—
1990–91	St. Michael's Buzzers	MetJHL	1	0	0	0	—	41	1	0	1.46	—	—	—	—	—	—	—	—	—
1991–92	Toronto Red Wings	MTHL	35	—	—	—	—	1,575	68	4	1.94	—	4	1	2	214	15	1	4.21	—
1991–92	St. Michael's Buzzers	MetJHL	2	0	1	1	—	127	11	0	5.20	—	—	—	—	—	—	—	—	—
1992–93	Owen Sound Platers	OHL	29	9	12	5	—	1,645	143	0	5.22	—	1	0	0	26	5	0	11.50	—
1993–94	Owen Sound Platers	OHL	34	13	19	1	—	1,974	158	0	4.80	—	—	—	—	—	—	—	—	—
1994–95	Ottawa 67's	OHL	41	13	23	4	—	2,266	153	1	4.05	—	—	—	—	—	—	—	—	—
1995–96	Carolina Monarchs	AHL	60	24	25	8	—	3,404	229	2	4.04	.876	—	—	—	—	—	—	—	—
1996–97	Carolina Monarchs	AHL	51	17	28	4	—	2,899	172	1	3.56	.895	—	—	—	—	—	—	—	—
1997–98	Florida Panthers	NHL	11	0	5	1	—	485	32	0	3.96	.870	—	—	—	—	—	—	—	—
1997–98	Fort Wayne Komets	IHL	12	9	2	1	—	719	34	1	2.84	.918	—	—	—	—	—	—	—	—
1998–99	Detroit Vipers	IHL	33	19	5	7	—	1,857	64	4	2.07	.919	—	—	—	—	—	—	—	—
1998–99	Vancouver Canucks	NHL	11	0	8	1	—	532	34	0	3.83	.868	—	—	—	—	—	—	—	—
1999–2000	Vancouver Canucks	NHL	20	6	7	4	—	986	47	1	2.86	.898	—	—	—	—	—	—	—	—
1999–2000	New York Islanders	NHL	36	10	20	4	—	2,025	115	1	3.41	.902	—	—	—	—	—	—	—	—
2000–01	Tampa Bay Lightning	NHL	61	20	33	3	—	3,377	177	4	3.14	.898	—	—	—	—	—	—	—	—
2001–02	Tampa Bay Lightning	NHL	19	3	9	0	—	829	40	2	2.89	.915	—	—	—	—	—	—	—	—
2001–02	Carolina Hurricanes	NHL	2	2	0	0	—	119	3	0	1.50	.927	8	3	2	408	11	2	1.62	.939
2002–03	Carolina Hurricanes	NHL	51	14	24	9	—	2,965	126	5	2.55	.912	—	—	—	—	—	—	—	—
2003–04	Carolina Hurricanes	NHL	66	23	30	11	—	3,764	146	6	2.33	.912	—	—	—	—	—	—	—	—
2005–06	New York Rangers	NHL	32	14	14	—	3	1,850	91	0	2.95	.895	1	0	1	60	4	0	4.00	.840
2006–07	New York Rangers	NHL	14	4	6	—	2	761	43	0	3.39	.879	—	—	—	—	—	—	—	—
2007–08	New Jersey Devils	NHL	9	2	2	—	1	343	17	0	2.97	.894	—	—	—	—	—	—	—	—
2008–09	New Jersey Devils	NHL	16	7	5	—	0	795	32	0	2.42	.920	—	—	—	—	—	—	—	—
NHL totals			348	105	163	33	6	18,837	903	19	2.88	.903	9	3	3	467	15	2	1.93	.927

== See also ==
- List of black NHL players
- List of NHL seasons
- NHL goaltenders
