= List of NHL All-Star Game broadcasters =

The following is a list of the television networks (American, English Canadian, and French Canadian) and announcers that have broadcast the National Hockey League All-Star Game over the years.

== American television ==
=== 2020s ===
| Year | Network | Play-by-play | Color commentator(s) | Ice level reporter(s) | Studio host | Studio analysts |
|---|---|---|---|---|---|---|
| 2024 | ABC/ESPN+ | Sean McDonough | Ray Ferraro | Emily Kaplan and Kevin Weekes | Steve Levy | Mark Messier and P. K. Subban |
| 2023 | ABC | Sean McDonough | Ray Ferraro | Emily Kaplan and Kevin Weekes | Steve Levy | Mark Messier, Chris Chelios, and P. K. Subban |
| 2023 | ESPN+ | Sean McDonough | Ray Ferraro | Emily Kaplan and Kevin Weekes | John Buccigross | Kevin Weekes |
| 2022 | ABC | Sean McDonough | Ray Ferraro | Emily Kaplan and Laura Rutledge | Steve Levy | Mark Messier and Chris Chelios |
| 2022 | ESPN+ | Sean McDonough | Ray Ferraro | Emily Kaplan and Laura Rutledge | Linda Cohn | Barry Melrose |
| 2020 | NBC | Mike Emrick | Eddie Olczyk | Pierre McGuire and Brian Boucher | Kathryn Tappen | Keith Jones and Patrick Sharp |

==== Notes ====
- The 2021 All-Star Game was not played due to the COVID-19 pandemic.
- The 2025 All-Star Game was not played and was replaced by the NHL 4 Nations Face-Off tournament.
- The 2026 All-Star Game was not played due to the league's participation in the 2026 Winter Olympics.

=== 2010s ===
| Year | Network | Play-by-play | Color commentator(s) | Ice level reporter(s) | Studio host | Studio analyst(s) |
|---|---|---|---|---|---|---|
| 2019 | NBC | Mike Emrick | Eddie Olczyk | Pierre McGuire and Jeremy Roenick | Mike Tirico and Kathryn Tappen | Mike Milbury and Jeremy Roenick |
| 2018 | NBC | Mike Emrick | Mike Milbury | Brian Boucher | Kathryn Tappen | Jeremy Roenick and Keith Jones |
| 2017 | NBC | Mike Emrick | Eddie Olczyk | Pierre McGuire and Jeremy Roenick | Liam McHugh | Mike Milbury, Keith Jones, and Jeremy Roenick |
| 2016 | NBCSN | Mike Emrick | Eddie Olczyk | Pierre McGuire and Jeremy Roenick | Liam McHugh | Mike Milbury, Keith Jones, and Jeremy Roenick |
| 2015 | NBCSN | Mike Emrick | Eddie Olczyk | Pierre McGuire and Jeremy Roenick | Liam McHugh | Mike Milbury, Keith Jones, and Jeremy Roenick |
| 2012 | NBCSN | Mike Emrick | Jeremy Roenick | Pierre McGuire | Liam McHugh | Mike Milbury and Keith Jones |
| 2011 | Versus | Mike Emrick | Eddie Olczyk | Charissa Thompson and Bob Harwood | Bill Patrick | Keith Jones and Brian Engblom |

==== Notes ====
- Versus (originally known as OLN) was renamed NBC Sports Network on January 2, 2012.
- The 2015 All-Star Game was to be played on January 27, 2013, at Nationwide Arena in Columbus, Ohio, home of the Columbus Blue Jackets for their first-ever hosting of the game. However, the game was postponed for two years, first because of the 2012–13 NHL lockout and then due to the league's participation in the 2014 Winter Olympics tournament.
- The 2017 All-Star Game was originally scheduled for Sunday night on NBCSN. However, it was moved to NBC and Sunday afternoon, marking the first network-television broadcast of the NHL All-Star Game since 2004.

=== 2000s ===
| Year | Network | Play-by-play | Color commentator(s) | Ice level reporter(s) | Studio host | Studio analyst(s) |
|---|---|---|---|---|---|---|
| 2009 | Versus | Mike Emrick | Brian Engblom | Christine Simpson and Bob Harwood | | |
| 2008 | Versus | Mike Emrick | Eddie Olczyk | Christine Simpson and Bob Harwood | Bill Patrick | Keith Jones and Brian Engblom |
| 2007 | Versus | Mike Emrick | Eddie Olczyk | Christine Simpson and Bob Harwood | Bill Clement | Keith Jones, Brian Engblom, and Mark Messier |
| 2004 | ABC | Gary Thorne | Bill Clement and John Davidson | Brian Engblom, Darren Pang, and Sam Ryan | John Saunders | Barry Melrose and Darren Pang |
| 2003 | ABC | Gary Thorne | Bill Clement and John Davidson | Brian Engblom and Darren Pang | John Saunders | Barry Melrose and Darren Pang |
| 2002 | ABC | Gary Thorne | Bill Clement | Brian Engblom and Darren Pang | John Saunders | John Davidson and Barry Melrose |
| 2001 | ABC | Gary Thorne | Bill Clement and Denis Leary | Brian Engblom, Darren Pang, and Steve Levy | John Saunders | John Davidson and Barry Melrose |
| 2000 | ABC | Gary Thorne | Bill Clement | Brian Engblom and Darren Pang | John Saunders | John Davidson and Barry Melrose |

==== Notes ====
- Denis Leary was the third-man in the broadcast booth and called the final 40 minutes of the 2001 All-Star Game at Pepsi Center in Denver.
- Because ABC Sports had rights to both the NHL All-Star Game and the Pro Bowl, ABC aired the All-Star Game and the Pro Bowl on the same day from 2000 through 2003, excluding 2002. ABC dubbed these doubleheaders as “All-Star Sunday”.
- The All-Star Game was dealt two serious blows in 2005. Not only was the game canceled along with the rest of the season as a result of the 2004–05 NHL lockout, but the subsequent CBA that ended the lockout stipulated that heretofore the game was to be held only in non-Olympic years. Thus, there was no All-Star Game held during the 2005–06 season and 2009–10 NHL season either.
- Brian Engblom replaced Eddie Olczyk as the color commentator for the 2009 All-Star Game at Bell Centre in Montreal due to Olczyk having an illness.

=== 1990s ===
| Year | Network | Play-by-play | Color commentator(s) | Ice level reporter(s) | Studio host | Studio analyst(s) |
|---|---|---|---|---|---|---|
| 1999 | Fox | Mike Emrick | John Davidson | Joe Micheletti | Suzy Kolber | Terry Crisp |
| 1998 | Fox | Mike Emrick | John Davidson | Joe Micheletti | James Brown | Dave Maloney |
| 1997 | Fox | Mike Emrick | John Davidson | Joe Micheletti | James Brown | Dave Maloney |
| 1996 | Fox | Mike Emrick | John Davidson | Joe Micheletti and Sandra Neil | James Brown | Dave Maloney |
| 1994 | NBC | Marv Albert | John Davidson | Bill Clement and Brenda Brenon | | |
| 1993 | NBC | Marv Albert | John Davidson | Ron MacLean | Gayle Gardner | |
| 1992 | NBC | Marv Albert | John Davidson | Bill Clement | Gayle Gardner | |
| 1991 | NBC | Marv Albert | John Davidson | Bill Clement | Gayle Gardner | |
| 1991 | SportsChannel America | Marv Albert | John Davidson | Bill Clement | Gayle Gardner | |
| 1990 | NBC | Marv Albert | John Davidson | Mike Emrick | | |

==== Notes ====
- NBC's coverage of the 1990 All-Star Game marked the first time in a decade that an American over-the-air television network (as opposed to cable) carried an NHL game nationally (since Game 6 of the 1980 Stanley Cup Finals aired on CBS). This is because the game itself was played on a Sunday afternoon instead of a Tuesday night, as was the case in previous years – marking the first time that a national audience would see Wayne Gretzky and Mario Lemieux play. Referees and other officials were also wired with microphones in this game, as were the two head coaches. Finally, NBC was allowed to conduct interviews with players during stoppages in play, to the chagrin of the Hockey Night in Canada crew, whose attempts to do likewise were repeatedly denied by the league in past years. (Technically, it was not quite a national broadcast as NBC's affiliates in Atlanta, Charlotte, Memphis, New Orleans, Indianapolis and Phoenix didn't air the game.)
- In 1991, NBC broke away from the live telecast of the All-Star Game during the third period in favor of Gulf War coverage; SportsChannel America showed the rest of the contest later that day.
- The 1995 All-Star Game was not played due to the 1994–95 NHL lockout.
- The 1996 and 1997 All-Star Games were televised in prime time.
  - Fox debuted their "FoxTrax" puck during the 1996 All-Star Game.

=== 1980s ===
| Year | Network | Play-by-play | Color commentator(s) | Ice level reporter(s) | Studio host(s) | Studio analyst(s) |
|---|---|---|---|---|---|---|
| 1989 | SportsChannel America | Jiggs McDonald | Scotty Bowman | Gary Thorne | | Denis Potvin and Herb Brooks |
| 1988 | ESPN | Mike Emrick | Bill Clement | Mickey Redmond | Tom Mees | |
| 1987 | ESPN | Ken Wilson | Bill Clement | —N/a | Tom Mees and John Saunders | |
| 1986 | ESPN | Sam Rosen | Mickey Redmond and John Davidson | Tom Mees | Jim Kelly | |
| 1985 | USA Network | Dan Kelly | Gary Green | —N/a | Al Trautwig | |
| 1984 | USA Network | Dan Kelly | Gary Green | —N/a | Al Trautwig | |
| 1983 | USA Network | Dan Kelly | Gary Green | —N/a | Al Trautwig | |
| 1982 | PRISM | Dan Kelly (first half); Gene Hart (second half) | Phil Esposito | —N/a | Dan Kelly | |
| 1981 | PRISM | Dan Kelly (first half); Gene Hart (second half) | Phil Esposito | —N/a | Dan Kelly | |
| 1980 | Hughes | Dan Kelly | Gary Dornhoefer and Dick Irvin Jr. | —N/a | Dave Hodge | |

==== Notes ====
- The 1980 American coverage from Hughes used CBC's feed.
- Locally in New York, the NHL All-Star Game was broadcast on WOR-TV Channel 9 until 1982. Beginning in 1983, it was broadcast on the NHL's cable TV partner.

=== 1970s ===
| Year | Network | Play-by-play | Color commentator(s) | Studio host | Studio analyst |
|---|---|---|---|---|---|
| 1979 | NHL Network (Games 1, 3) | Dan Kelly (first half); Danny Gallivan (second half) | Bobby Orr and Dick Irvin Jr. | Dave Hodge | Howie Meeker |
| 1979 | CBS (Game 2) | Dan Kelly | Lou Nanne | Dick Stockton | |
| 1978 | NHL Network (CBC feed) | Dan Kelly | Bobby Orr and Dick Irvin Jr. | | |
| 1977 | NHL Network | Dan Kelly | Marv Albert | | |
| 1976 | NHL Network | Gene Hart | Bobby Orr and Bobby Hull | | |
| 1975 | NBC | Tim Ryan | Ted Lindsay | Brian McFarlane | |
| 1974 | NBC | Tim Ryan | Ted Lindsay | Brian McFarlane | |
| 1973 | NBC | Tim Ryan | Ted Lindsay | Brian McFarlane | |
| 1972 | Hughes | Tim Ryan | | | |
| 1971 | CBS | Dan Kelly | Jim Gordon | | |
| 1970 | CBS (CBC feed) | Bill Hewitt (first half); Dan Kelly (second half) | Bob Goldham and Dick Irvin Jr. | Ward Cornell | |

==== Notes ====
- The Challenge Cup replaced the All-Star Game in 1979. Staged at Madison Square Garden, the Challenge Cup was a best-of 3-series between the NHL All-Stars against the Soviet Union national squad. Games 1 and 3 were shown on the NHL Network, while Game 2 was carried, in bizarre fashion, on CBS. First, only the third period was aired on CBS (as part of CBS Sports Spectacular), which had a problem with the dasher board advertising that the NHL sold at Madison Square Garden. The network (after complaints from other CBS sponsors) refused to allow the ads to be shown; as a result, viewers were unable to view the far boards above the yellow kickplate, and could only see players' skates when the play moved to that side of the ice. (Games 1 and 3 were seen in their entirety on the NHL Network, which had no problem with the advertising.)

== Canadian television (English) ==
=== 2020s ===
| Year | Network | Play-by-play | Color commentator(s) | Ice level reporter(s) | Studio host | Studio analysts |
|---|---|---|---|---|---|---|
| 2024 | CBC/CBC Gem | Chris Cuthbert | Craig Simpson | Kevin Bieksa, David Amber, and Kyle Bukauskas | Ron MacLean | Kelly Hrudey, Elliotte Friedman, and Jennifer Botterill |
| 2024 | Sportsnet/Sportsnet+ | Chris Cuthbert | Craig Simpson | Kevin Bieksa, David Amber, and Kyle Bukauskas | Ron MacLean | Kelly Hrudey, Elliotte Friedman, and Jennifer Botterill |
| 2024 | Citytv (ABC feed) | Sean McDonough | Ray Ferraro | Emily Kaplan and Kevin Weekes | Steve Levy | Mark Messier and P. K. Subban |
| 2023 | CBC | Chris Cuthbert | Craig Simpson | Kevin Bieksa, David Amber, and Kyle Bukauskas | Ron MacLean | Kelly Hrudey, Elliotte Friedman, and Jennifer Botterill |
| 2023 | Sportsnet | Chris Cuthbert | Craig Simpson | Kevin Bieksa, David Amber, and Kyle Bukauskas | Ron MacLean | Kelly Hrudey, Elliotte Friedman, and Jennifer Botterill |
| 2022 | Sportsnet | Chris Cuthbert | Craig Simpson | Kevin Bieksa and Colby Armstrong | Ron MacLean | Kelly Hrudey, Elliotte Friedman, and Jennifer Botterill |
| 2020 | CBC | Jim Hughson | Craig Simpson | Kevin Bieksa, David Amber, and Caroline Cameron | Ron MacLean | Kelly Hrudey, Brian Burke, and Elliotte Friedman |
| 2020 | Sportsnet | Jim Hughson | Craig Simpson | Kevin Bieksa, David Amber, and Caroline Cameron | Ron MacLean | Kelly Hrudey, Brian Burke, and Elliotte Friedman |

==== Notes ====
- Due to its coverage of the 2022 Winter Olympics, CBC did not simulcast Sportsnet's coverage of the 2022 All-Star Game.
- For simultaneous substitution purposes, Sportsnet's sister station, Citytv, simulcast ABC's coverage in 2024.
- The 2025 All-Star Game was not played and was replaced by the NHL 4 Nations Face-Off tournament.

=== 2010s ===
| Year | Network | Play-by-play | Color commentator | Ice level reporters | Studio host | Studio analyst(s) |
|---|---|---|---|---|---|---|
| 2019 | CBC | Jim Hughson | Craig Simpson | Scott Oake and Kevin Bieksa | Ron MacLean | Kelly Hrudey, Nick Kypreos, and Elliotte Friedman |
| 2019 | Sportsnet | Jim Hughson | Craig Simpson | Scott Oake and Kevin Bieksa | Ron MacLean | Kelly Hrudey, Nick Kypreos, and Elliotte Friedman |
| 2018 | CBC | Jim Hughson | Craig Simpson | Glenn Healy and David Amber | Ron MacLean | Kelly Hrudey, Nick Kypreos, and Elliotte Friedman |
| 2018 | Sportsnet | Jim Hughson | Craig Simpson | Glenn Healy and David Amber | Ron MacLean | Kelly Hrudey, Nick Kypreos, and Elliotte Friedman |
| 2017 | CBC | Jim Hughson | Craig Simpson | Scott Oake and David Amber | Ron MacLean | Don Cherry, Kelly Hrudey, Nick Kypreos, and Elliotte Friedman |
| 2017 | Sportsnet | Jim Hughson | Craig Simpson | Scott Oake and David Amber | Ron MacLean | Don Cherry, Kelly Hrudey, Nick Kypreos, and Elliotte Friedman |
| 2016 | CBC | Dave Randorf | Garry Galley | Glenn Healy, Elliotte Friedman, and Christine Simpson | George Stroumboulopoulos | Nick Kypreos and Damien Cox |
| 2015 | CBC | Dave Randorf | Garry Galley | Glenn Healy, Scott Oake, and Elliotte Friedman | George Stroumboulopoulos | Nick Kypreos, Damien Cox, and Doug MacLean |
| 2012 | CBC | Jim Hughson | Craig Simpson | Glenn Healy, Scott Oake, and Elliotte Friedman | Ron MacLean | Don Cherry |
| 2011 | CBC | Jim Hughson | Craig Simpson | Glenn Healy, Scott Oake, and Elliotte Friedman | Ron MacLean | Kelly Hrudey |

=== 2000s ===
| Year | Network | Play-by-play | Colour commentator(s) | Ice level reporter(s) | Studio host | Studio analyst(s) |
|---|---|---|---|---|---|---|
| 2009 | CBC | Jim Hughson | Craig Simpson | Scott Oake and Elliotte Friedman | Ron MacLean | Don Cherry |
| 2008 | CBC | Jim Hughson | Greg Millen | Scott Oake and Cassie Campbell-Pascall | Ron MacLean | Kelly Hrudey |
| 2007 | CBC | Jim Hughson | Harry Neale | Scott Oake and Cassie Campbell-Pascall | Ron MacLean | Kelly Hrudey |
| 2004 | CBC | Bob Cole | Harry Neale and Scotty Bowman | Elliotte Friedman and Scott Oake | Ron MacLean | Kelly Hrudey |
| 2003 | CBC | Bob Cole | Harry Neale | Scott Russell and Scott Oake | Ron MacLean | Kelly Hrudey |
| 2002 | CBC | Bob Cole | Harry Neale | Scott Russell and Scott Oake | Ron MacLean | Kelly Hrudey, Glen Sather, and Greg Millen |
| 2001 | CBC | Bob Cole | Harry Neale | Scott Russell and Scott Oake | Ron MacLean | Kelly Hrudey, Al Strachan, and Greg Millen |
| 2000 | CBC | Bob Cole | Harry Neale | Scott Russell and Scott Oake | Ron MacLean | Don Cherry |

=== 1990s ===
| Year | Network | Play-by-play | Colour commentator(s) | Ice level reporter(s) | Studio host | Studio analyst(s) |
|---|---|---|---|---|---|---|
| 1999 | CBC | Bob Cole | Harry Neale and Dick Irvin Jr. | Scott Russell and Scott Oake | Ron MacLean | Kelly Hrudey, Al Strachan, and Chris Cuthbert |
| 1998 | CBC | Bob Cole | Harry Neale and Dick Irvin Jr. | Scott Russell and Scott Oake | Ron MacLean | Don Cherry, Al Strachan, John Garrett, and Jim Hughson |
| 1997 | CBC | Bob Cole | Harry Neale and Dick Irvin Jr. | Scott Russell | Ron MacLean | Greg Millen, John Garrett, and Chris Cuthbert |
| 1996 | CBC | Bob Cole | Harry Neale and Dick Irvin Jr. | Scott Russell | Ron MacLean | |
| 1994 | CBC | Bob Cole | Harry Neale and Dick Irvin Jr. | —N/a | Ron MacLean and Scott Russell | Don Cherry |
| 1993 | TSN | Jim Hughson | Gary Green | —N/a | John Wells | Bob McKenzie and Howie Meeker |
| 1992 | TSN | Jim Hughson | Gary Green | Jim Van Horne | John Wells | Bob McKenzie and Howie Meeker |
| 1991 | TSN | Jim Hughson | Gary Green | —N/a | John Wells | Bob McKenzie and Howie Meeker |
| 1990 | TSN | Jim Hughson | Gary Green | —N/a | Jim Van Horne | Bob McKenzie and Howie Meeker |

=== 1980s ===
| Year | Network | Play-by-play | Colour commentator(s) | Ice level reporter | Studio host | Studio analyst |
|---|---|---|---|---|---|---|
| 1989 | CBC | Bob Cole | Harry Neale and Dick Irvin Jr. | Ron MacLean and Chris Cuthbert | | Don Cherry |
| 1988 | CBC | Bob Cole | Harry Neale | —N/a | Ron MacLean | Scotty Bowman |
| 1987 | CBC | Don Wittman | John Davidson | —N/a | Brian Williams | |
| 1986 | TSN | John Wells | Howie Meeker | —N/a | Jim Van Horne | Bob McKenzie |
| 1985 | CBC | Dick Irvin Jr. | Howie Meeker and John Davidson | —N/a | Dave Hodge | Don Cherry |
| 1984 | CBC | Danny Gallivan | Dick Irvin Jr. | —N/a | Brian McFarlane | Don Cherry |
| 1983 | CBC | Jim Robson | Mickey Redmond | —N/a | Dave Hodge | Don Cherry |
| 1982 | CBC | Danny Gallivan | Dick Irvin Jr. | —N/a | Dave Hodge | Don Cherry |
| 1981 | CBC | Jim Robson | Gary Dornhoefer | —N/a | Dave Hodge | Howie Meeker |
| 1980 | CBC | Dan Kelly | Gary Dornhoefer and Dick Irvin Jr. | —N/a | Dave Hodge | |

==== Notes ====
- The 1986 Canadian coverage was to be provided by CTV. However, CTV had a prior commitment to carry a U.S. miniseries. As a result, TSN took over coverage of the game in Hartford.
- In 1987, Rendez-vous '87 (a two-game series between a team of all-stars from the National Hockey League and the Soviet national team) replaced the All-Star Game. While the telecasts in Canada were on CBC as usual, they were not Hockey Night in Canada productions. The games were done as a CBC Sports production as Molson, who owned Hockey Night in Canada's rights at the time, was not allowed access to Le Colisée in Quebec City. Carling O'Keefe Breweries assumed advertising rights for the telecasts and the normal host(s) for Hockey Night in Canada in 1987, rookie Ron MacLean, veteran Dave Hodge (before his late-season firing), and Don Cherry were replaced by Brian Williams. Even the ice-blue blazers normally worn by Hockey Night in Canada commentators were replaced by the orange CBC sport coats. Don Wittman and John Davidson called the action for CBC. The games were shown in the United States on ESPN, with Ken Wilson and Bill Clement in the booth and Tom Mees and John Saunders as the studio hosts.

=== 1970s ===
| Year | Network | Play-by-play | Color commentator(s) | Studio host | Studio analyst(s) |
|---|---|---|---|---|---|
| 1979 | CBC (Games 1–2) | Danny Gallivan; Dan Kelly (first half of Games 1, 3) | Bobby Orr and Dick Irvin Jr. | Dave Hodge | Howie Meeker |
| 1979 | CTV (Game 3) | Danny Gallivan; Dan Kelly (first half of Games 1, 3) | Bobby Orr and Dick Irvin Jr. | Dave Hodge | Howie Meeker |
| 1978 | CBC | Dan Kelly | Bobby Orr and Dick Irvin Jr. | Dave Hodge | |
| 1977 | CBC | Jim Robson | Bill Good Jr. | Dave Hodge and Ted Reynolds | Babe Pratt |
| 1976 | CBC | Bob Cole | Dick Irvin Jr. and Dennis Hull | Dave Hodge | |
| 1975 | CBC | Danny Gallivan | Dick Irvin Jr. | Dave Hodge and Dave Reynolds | |
| 1974 | CBC | Bill Hewitt | Brian McFarlane | Dave Hodge | |
| 1973 | CBC | Danny Gallivan | Dick Irvin Jr. | Dave Hodge | |
| 1972 | CBC | Bill Hewitt | Bob Goldham and Dick Irvin Jr. | Dave Hodge and Brian McFarlane | |
| 1971 | CBC | Danny Gallivan | Bob Goldham | Ward Cornell and Brian McFarlane | Brian McFarlane, Babe Pratt, and Jack Dennett |
| 1970 | CBC | Bill Hewitt (first half); Dan Kelly (second half) | Bob Goldham and Dick Irvin Jr. | Ward Cornell | |

=== 1960s ===
| Year | Network | Play-by-play | Colour commentator | Studio host |
|---|---|---|---|---|
| 1969 | CBC | Danny Gallivan | Dan Kelly | Ward Cornell and Ted Darling |
| 1968 | CBC | Bill Hewitt | Brian McFarlane | Ward Cornell |
| 1967 | CBC | Danny Gallivan | Dick Irvin Jr. | Ward Cornell and Frank Selke Jr. |
| 1965 | CBC | Danny Gallivan | Keith Dancy | Ward Cornell and Frank Selke Jr. |
| 1964 | CBC | Bill Hewitt | Jim Morrison | Ward Cornell and Frank Selke Jr. |
| 1963 | CBC | Bill Hewitt | | Ward Cornell and Frank Selke Jr. |
| 1962 | CBC | Bill Hewitt | | Ward Cornell and Frank Selke Jr. |
| 1961 | CBC | Danny Gallivan (1st and 3rd periods); Bill Hewitt (2nd period) | Bill Hewitt (1st and 3rd periods); Danny Gallivan (2nd period) | Ward Cornell and Frank Selke Jr. |
| 1960 | CBC | Danny Gallivan | Keith Dancy | Frank Selke Jr. |

=== 1950s ===
| Year | Network | Play-by-play | Colour commentator | Studio host |
|---|---|---|---|---|
| 1959 | CBC | Danny Gallivan | Frank Selke Jr. | Tom Foley and Scott Young |
| 1958 | CBC | Danny Gallivan | Frank Selke Jr. | Tom Foley |
| 1957 | CBC | Danny Gallivan | Frank Selke Jr. | Tom Foley and Wes McKnight |
| 1956 | CBC | Danny Gallivan | | |
| 1955 | CBC | Foster Hewitt | | |
| 1954 | CBC | Foster Hewitt | | |
| 1953 | CBC | Danny Gallivan | | |

== Canadian television (French) ==
=== 2020s ===
| Year | Network | Play-by-play | Colour commentator |
|---|---|---|---|
| 2024 | TVA Sports | Félix Séguin | Patrick Lalime |
| 2023 | TVA Sports | Félix Séguin | Patrick Lalime |
| 2022 | TVA Sports | Félix Séguin | Patrick Lalime |
| 2020 | TVA Sports | Félix Séguin | Patrick Lalime |

=== 2010s ===
| Year | Network | Play-by-play | Colour commentator |
|---|---|---|---|
| 2019 | TVA Sports | Félix Séguin | Patrick Lalime |
| 2018 | TVA Sports | Félix Séguin | Patrick Lalime |
| 2017 | TVA Sports | Félix Séguin | Patrick Lalime |
| 2016 | TVA Sports | Félix Séguin | Patrick Lalime |
| 2015 | TVA Sports | Félix Séguin | Patrick Lalime |
| 2012 | RDS | Pierre Houde | Patrick Lalime |
| 2011 | RDS | Pierre Houde | Benoît Brunet |

=== 2000s ===
| Year | Network | Play-by-play | Colour commentator |
|---|---|---|---|
| 2009 | RDS | Pierre Houde | Benoît Brunet |
| 2008 | RDS | Pierre Houde | Yvon Pedneault |
| 2007 | RDS | Pierre Houde | Yvon Pedneault |
| 2004 | RDS | Pierre Houde | Yvon Pedneault |
| 2003 | RDS | Pierre Houde | Yvon Pedneault |
| 2002 | SRC | Claude Quenneville | Michel Bergeron |
| 2001 | SRC | Claude Quenneville | Michel Bergeron |
| 2000 | SRC | Claude Quenneville | Michel Bergeron |

=== 1990s ===
| Year | Network | Play-by-play | Colour commentator |
|---|---|---|---|
| 1999 | SRC | Claude Quenneville | Michel Bergeron |
| 1998 | SRC | Claude Quenneville | Gilles Tremblay |
| 1997 | SRC | Claude Quenneville | Gilles Tremblay |
| 1996 | SRC | Claude Quenneville | Gilles Tremblay |
| 1994 | SRC | Claude Quenneville | Gilles Tremblay |
| 1993 | SRC | Claude Quenneville | Gilles Tremblay |
| 1992 | SRC | Claude Quenneville | Gilles Tremblay |
| 1991 | SRC | Claude Quenneville | Gilles Tremblay |
| 1990 | SRC | Richard Garneau | Gilles Tremblay |

=== 1980s ===
| Year | Network | Play-by-play | Colour commentator |
|---|---|---|---|
| 1989 | SRC | Richard Garneau | Gilles Tremblay |
| 1988 | SRC | Richard Garneau | Gilles Tremblay |
| 1987 | SRC | René Lecavalier | Charles Thiffault and Guy Lafleur |
| 1986 | SRC | Richard Garneau | Gilles Tremblay |
| 1985 | SRC | Richard Garneau | Gilles Tremblay |
| 1984 | SRC | Richard Garneau | Gilles Tremblay |
| 1983 | SRC | Richard Garneau | Gilles Tremblay |
| 1982 | SRC | Richard Garneau | René Lecavalier |
| 1981 | SRC | Richard Garneau | René Lecavalier |
| 1980 | SRC | Richard Garneau | René Lecavalier |

=== 1970s ===
| Year | Network | Play-by-play | Colour commentator |
|---|---|---|---|
| 1979 | SRC | René Lecavalier | Gilles Tremblay |
| 1978 | SRC | René Lecavalier | Gilles Tremblay |
| 1977 | SRC | René Lecavalier | Gilles Tremblay |
| 1976 | SRC | René Lecavalier | Gilles Tremblay |
| 1975 | SRC | René Lecavalier | Gilles Tremblay |
| 1974 | SRC | René Lecavalier | Gilles Tremblay |
| 1973 | SRC | René Lecavalier | Gilles Tremblay |
| 1972 | SRC | René Lecavalier | Gilles Tremblay |
| 1971 | SRC | René Lecavalier | Gilles Tremblay |
| 1970 | SRC | René Lecavalier | Jean-Maurice Bailly |

=== 1960s ===
| Year | Network | Play-by-play | Colour commentator |
|---|---|---|---|
| 1969 | SRC | René Lecavalier | Jean-Maurice Bailly |
| 1965 | SRC | René Lecavalier | Jean-Maurice Bailly |
| 1964 | SRC | René Lecavalier | Jean-Maurice Bailly |
| 1963 | SRC | René Lecavalier | Jean-Maurice Bailly |
| 1962 | SRC | René Lecavalier | Jean-Maurice Bailly |
| 1961 | SRC | René Lecavalier | Jean-Maurice Bailly |
| 1960 | SRC | René Lecavalier | Jean-Maurice Bailly |

=== 1950s ===
| Year | Network | Play-by-play | Colour commentator |
|---|---|---|---|
| 1959 | SRC | René Lecavalier | Jean-Maurice Bailly |
| 1958 | SRC | René Lecavalier | Jean-Maurice Bailly |
| 1957 | SRC | René Lecavalier | Jean-Maurice Bailly |
| 1956 | SRC | René Lecavalier | Jean-Maurice Bailly |
| 1955 | SRC | René Lecavalier | Jean-Maurice Bailly |
| 1954 | SRC | René Lecavalier | Jean-Maurice Bailly |
| 1953 | SRC | René Lecavalier | Jean-Maurice Bailly |

== See also ==
- National Hockey League All-Star Game
