= List of Canadian Stanley Cup Final television announcers =

This is a list of Canadian Stanley Cup Final television announcers.

== Play-by-play (English) ==
Announcer	Years	Network(s)
Chris Cuthbert	2021–present	CBC/Sportsnet
Bob Cole	1980–2008	CBC
Danny Gallivan	1953–1960; 1965–1979	CBC
Bill Hewitt	1959–1964; 1967; 1970; 1972; 1974	CBC
Jim Hughson	2009–2020	CBC/Sportsnet
Dan Kelly	1978–1980; 1985–1988	CBC
Dan Kelly	1978–1980; 1985–1988	CTV
Dan Kelly	1978–1980; 1985–1988	Canwest/Global
Jim Robson	1975; 1980; 1982–1983	CBC
Don Wittman	1985–1986	CBC

=== ABC feed ===
Announcer	Years	Network(s)
Sean McDonough	2022 (Game 6), 2024, 2026	Citytv

== Colour commentary (English) ==
Announcer	Years	Network(s)
Keith Dancy	1964–1966	CBC
John Davidson	1985–1988	CBC
John Davidson	1985–1988	Canwest/Global
Gary Dornhoefer	1979–1985	CBC
Bob Goldham	1970, 1972	CBC
Foster Hewitt	1959–1960	CBC
Dick Irvin Jr.	1967–1980; 1982; 1984; 1986; 1989; 1991–1994	CBC
Dan Kelly	1967–1968	CBC
Brian McFarlane	1967; 1970; 1972; 1974	CBC
Greg Millen	2007–2008	CBC
Harry Neale	1987–2007	CBC
Brad Park	1985–1986	CTV
Mickey Redmond	1981–1984, 1986	CBC
Ron Reusch	1985–1986	CTV
Frank Selke Jr.	1958–1960	CBC
Craig Simpson	2009–present	CBC/Sportsnet

== Ice level analysts (English) ==
Announcer	Years	Network(s)
Glenn Healy	2010–2016	CBC/Sportsnet

=== ABC feed ===
Announcer	Years	Network(s)
Ray Ferraro	2022 (Game 6), 2024, 2026	Citytv

== Rinkside reporters ==
Announcer	Years	Network(s)
David Amber	2017–2018	CBC/Sportsnet
Kyle Bukauskas	2019–2024, 2026–present	CBC/Sportsnet
Chris Cuthbert	1987–1990, 1997	CBC
Elliotte Friedman	2004–2012, 2016	CBC/Sportsnet
Scott Oake	1986–2020	CBC/Sportsnet
Gene Principe	2024–2025	CBC/Sportsnet
Scott Russell	1995–2003	CBC
Christine Simpson	2015	CBC/Sportsnet

=== ABC feed ===
Announcer	Years	Network(s)
Emily Kaplan	2022 (Game 6), 2024, 2026	Citytv

== Studio host(s) ==
Announcer	Years	Network(s)
David Amber	2020–present	CBC/Sportsnet
Mike Anscombe	1974	CBC
Steve Armitage	1982 (in Vancouver)	CBC
Ward Cornell	1959–1971	CBC
Ted Darling	1969–1970	CBC
Johnny Esaw	1960	CBC
Tom Foley	1958–1959	CBC
Dave Hodge	1972–1986	CBC
Dave Hodge	1972–1986	CTV
Dick Irvin Jr.	1977–1979 (in Montreal)	CBC
Dan Kelly	1968, 1978–1979 (in Montreal)	CBC
Ron MacLean	1987–present	CBC/Sportsnet
Brian McFarlane	1971–1973, 1975	CBC
Brian McFarlane	1971–1973, 1975	CTV
Dan Matheson	1985–1986	CTV
Scott Oake	2008	CBC
Dave Reynolds	1975–1977	CBC
Ted Reynolds	1973	CBC
Scott Russell	1997	CBC
Frank Selke Jr.	1961–1967	CBC
George Stroumboulopoulos	2015–2016	CBC/Sportsnet
John Wells	1983–1984 (in Edmonton)	CBC
Scott Young	1959	CBC

=== ABC feed ===
Announcer	Years	Network(s)
Steve Levy	2022 (Game 6), 2024, 2026	Citytv

== Studio analyst(s) ==
Announcer	Years	Network(s)
Kevin Bieksa	2020–present	CBC/Sportsnet
Jennifer Botterill	2022–present	CBC/Sportsnet
Brian Burke	2020	CBC/Sportsnet
Don Cherry	1981–2019	CBC/Sportsnet
Cassie Campbell-Pascall	2020–2021	CBC/Sportsnet
Elliotte Friedman	2013–present	CBC/Sportsnet
Kelly Hrudey	1997, 2006–present	CBC
Nick Kypreos	2015–2019	CBC/Sportsnet
Howie Meeker	1976, 1979–1981, 1983–1984	CBC
Brad Park	1985–1986	CTV
Frank J. Selke	1963–1967	CBC
Craig Simpson	2008	CBC
Anthony Stewart	2020	CBC/Sportsnet
P.J. Stock	2009–2014	CBC/Sportsnet

=== ABC feed ===
Announcer	Years	Network(s)
Brian Boucher	2022 (Game 6)	Citytv
Chris Chelios	2022 (Game 6)	Citytv
Erik Johnson	2026 (Games 3 and 4)	Citytv
Mark Messier	2022 (Game 6), 2024, 2026	Citytv
P. K. Subban	2024, 2026	Citytv

== English-language networks ==
- CBC (1953–1971; 1973–2026)
- Sportsnet (2017–present)
- Citytv (2022 (Game 6), 2024, 2026, 2028; ABC feed)
- CTV (1972; 1985–1986)
- Global (1987–1988)

CBC's coverage of Games 3, 4 and 5 of the 1954 Stanley Cup Final were joined in progress at 9:30 p.m. (approximately one hour after start time). Meanwhile, CBC joined Game 6 in at 10 p.m. (again, one hour after start time). Game 7 was carried Dominion wide (nationwide) from opening the face off at 9 p.m. Since Game 7 was played on Good Friday night, there were no commercials (Imperial Oil was the sponsor).

The 1961 Stanley Cup Final were almost not televised in Canada at all. At that time, the CBC only had rights to the Montreal Canadiens and Toronto Maple Leafs' games; home games only during the season and all games in the playoffs. However, with both the Canadiens and Maple Leafs eliminated in the semi-finals, the CBC's worst nightmare became reality. The CBC had to conceive a way to carry the Finals between the Chicago Black Hawks-Detroit Red Wings or face public revolt. According to lore, the CBC found a way to link their Windsor viewers as having a vested interest in the Finals with the across the river Red Wings. Thus, CBC was able to carry the series after inking special contracts with the Red Wings and Black Hawks as a service to the Windsor market. From Windsor, CBC linked the signal to Toronto and they relayed the coverage Dominion-wide. From there, Canadians were able to see the Finals with nary a glitch in the coverage.

To accommodate the American TV coverage on NBC (1966 marked the first time that a Stanley Cup Final game was to be nationally broadcast on American network television), Game 1 of the 1966 Stanley Cup Final was shifted to a Sunday afternoon. This in return, was the first time ever that a National Hockey League game was played on a Sunday afternoon in Montreal. While Games 1 and 4 of the NBC broadcasts were televised in color, CBC carried these games and all other games in black and white.

The most commonly seen video clip of Bobby Orr's famous overtime goal ("The Flight") in Game 4 of the 1970 Stanley Cup Final is the American version broadcast on CBS as called by Dan Kelly. This archival clip can be considered a rarity, since about 98% of the time, any surviving kinescopes or videotapes of the actual telecasts of hockey games from this era usually emanate from CBC's coverage. According to Dick Irvin Jr.'s book My 26 Stanley Cups (Irvin was in the CBC booth with Danny Gallivan during the 1970 Stanley Cup Final), he was always curious why even the CBC prototypically uses the CBS replay of the Bobby Orr goal (with Dan Kelly's commentary) instead of Gallivan's call. The explanation that Irvin received was that the CBC's master tape of the game (along with others) was thrown away in order clear shelf space at the network.

In 1972, Hockey Night in Canada moved all playoff coverage from CBC to CTV to avoid conflict with the lengthy NABET strike against the CBC. Eventually, MacLaren Advertising, in conjunction with Molson Breweries and Imperial Oil/Esso, who actually owned the rights to Hockey Night in Canada (not CBC) decided to give the playoff telecast rights to CTV. Initially, it was on a game by game basis in the quarterfinals (Game 1 of the Boston-Toronto series was seen on CFTO Toronto in full while other CTV affiliates, but not all joined the game in progress. Game 1 of the New York Rangers–Montreal series was seen only on CFCF Montreal while Game 4 not televised due to a lockout of technicians at the Montreal Forum), and then the full semifinals and Stanley Cup Final. Because CTV did not have 100% penetration in Canada at this time, they asked CBC (who ultimately refused) to allow whatever one of their affiliates were the sole network in that market to show the playoffs. As a result, the 1972 Stanley Cup playoffs were not seen in some of the smaller Canadian markets unless said markets were close enough to the United States border to pick up the signal of a CBS affiliate that carried Games, 1, 4, or 6 (Games 2, 3 and 5 were not nationally broadcast in the United States).

In 1980, Bob Cole, Dan Kelly and Jim Robson shared play-by-play duties for CBC's coverage. Cole did play-by-play for the first half of Games 1 and 2. Meanwhile, Kelly did play-by-play for the second half Games 1–5 (Kelly also did call the overtime period of Game 1). Finally, Robson did play-by-play for first half of Games 3 and 4 and Game 6 entirely. Except for Game 5, Kelly did play-by-play for the first period and first half Games 5, and Jim Robson play-by-play for the rest of Game 5. In essence this meant that Bob Cole or Jim Robson would do play-by-play for the first period and the first half of the second period. Therefore, at the closest stoppage of play near the 10 minute mark of the second period, Cole or Robson handed off the call to Kelly for the rest of the game.

In 1985, CBC televised Games 1 and 2 nationally while Games 3–5 were televised in Edmonton only. CTV televised Games 3–5 nationally while games were blacked out in Edmonton. Dan Kelly, Ron Reusch, and Brad Park called the games on CTV. In 1986, CBC only televised Games 1 and 2 in Montreal and Calgary. CBC televised Games 3–5 nationally. When CTV televised Games 1 and 2, both games were blacked out in Montreal and Calgary. Like in the year prior, Dan Kelly, Ron Reusch, and Brad Park called the games for CTV.

Unlike the split CTV/CBC coverage of 1984–85 and 1985–86, the Canwest-Global telecasts from 1986–87-1987–88 were network exclusive, except for Game 7 of the Stanley Cup Final if they were necessary. When CBC and Global televised Game 7 of the 1987 Stanley Cup Final, they used separate production facilities and separate on-air talent.

Sportsnet gained the national broadcast rights starting in 2014–15. Under a sub-licensing agreement beginning with the 2015 Stanley Cup Final, the CBC broadcast has been produced by Sportsnet; all Stanley Cup Final games have been also simulcast on Sportsnet since 2017. The CBC simulcasts ended after the 2026 Final with the network no longer renewing its sublicensing deal with Sportsnet. Since Game 6 in 2022, Sportsnet's sister station Citytv has simulcast the American broadcast feed for simultaneous substitution purposes.

== Play-by-play (French) ==
Announcer	Years	Network(s)
Richard Garneau	1986–1990	SRC
Pierre Houde	2003–2014	RDS
Pierre Houde	2003–2014	SRC
Rene Lecavalier	1953–1985	SRC
Jacques Moreau	1973	TVA
Claude Quenneville	1991–2002	SRC
Felix Seguin	2015–present	TVA

== Colour commentary (French) ==
Announcer	Years	Network(s)
Jean-Maurice Bailly	1953–1970	SRC
Michel Bergeron	1999–2002	SRC
Benoit Brunet	2009–2011	RDS
Marc Denis	2012–2014	RDS
Patrick Lalime	2015–present	TVS
Yvon Pedneault	2003–2008	RDS
Gilles Tremblay	1971–1998	SRC
Gilles Tremblay	1971–1998	TVA
Mario Tremblay	1986	SRC

=== French-language networks ===
- RDS (2003–2014)
- SRC (1953–2002)
- TVA (1973; 2015–present)

== See also ==
- Stanley Cup Final#Broadcasting
- List of Hockey Night in Canada commentators
- List of American Stanley Cup Final television announcers
- List of Stanley Cup Final broadcasters
