= List of NHL outdoor games broadcasters =

The following is a list of NHL regular season outdoor games broadcasters, including those in Canada and in the United States.

The first NHL Heritage Classic was played in 2003 at Commonwealth Stadium between the Edmonton Oilers and the Montreal Canadiens. Although the Oilers had suggested the idea of hosting an outdoor game as early as the mid-1980s, the genesis of the 2003 event was the "Cold War" outdoor game played two years prior between Michigan State University and the University of Michigan.

One year later, NBC Sports Executive VP Jon Miller pitched the idea of an annual outdoor television event to the NHL in 2004 "but they didn't find the concept workable." In December 2006, Miller found an ally in then NHL Executive VP/Business & Media John Collins, who embraced the idea. The first Winter Classic was held January 1, 2008, between the Buffalo Sabres and Pittsburgh Penguins at Ralph Wilson Stadium in Orchard Park, New York. The game had an NHL-record crowd of 71,217 fans in attendance. The success of the 2008 NHL Winter Classic led the NHL to schedule a second one for 2009, held at Wrigley Field in Chicago, Illinois, on January 1, 2009, matching the Detroit Red Wings against the Chicago Blackhawks.

That game had the highest American television ratings of any hockey game in 33 years. The success of the 2009 NHL Winter Classic has solidified "the Classic" as an annual event from then on. The Winter Classic was officially made a permanent part of the NHL schedule through at least January 1, 2021, as part of the league's television contract with the NBC Sports Group. The Winter Classic is also broadcast in Canada by the league's TV partner there too.

Unlike the annual Winter Classic and Stadium Series games, Heritage Classic games have been held infrequently.

For the 2013–14 NHL season, the NHL introduced three other outdoor games known as the Stadium Series. The 2014 Stadium Series was held in Los Angeles, California, New York City and Chicago, Illinois. Another Stadium Series game was held the following season in Santa Clara, California, with two more games scheduled for the 2015–16 season in Denver, Colorado and Minneapolis, Minnesota.

To celebrate the league's centennial anniversary in 2017, two special outdoor games were held: The NHL Centennial Classic on January 1, 2017, to kick off the year; and then the NHL 100 Classic played on December 16.

== United States ==
Year	Network	Play-by-play	Color commentator(s)	Ice-level analyst(s)	Rinkside reporter(s)	Studio host	Studio analyst(s)
2026 Heritage Classic	TNT/truTV/HBO Max	John Forslund	Eddie Olczyk	Brian Boucher	Jackie Redmond	Liam McHugh	Paul Bissonnette, Anson Carter and Bruce Cassidy
2026 Stadium Series	ESPN	Sean McDonough	Ray Ferraro		Emily Kaplan and Kevin Weekes	Steve Levy	Mark Messier and P. K. Subban
2026 Winter Classic	TNT/truTV/HBO Max	Kenny Albert	Eddie Olczyk	Brian Boucher	Darren Pang and Jackie Redmond	Liam McHugh	Anson Carter, Paul Bissonnette, Wayne Gretzky, and Henrik Lundqvist
2025 Stadium Series	ESPN/ESPN+/Disney+	Sean McDonough	Ray Ferraro		Emily Kaplan, Kevin Weekes, and Marty Smith	Steve Levy	Mark Messier and P. K. Subban
2025 Winter Classic	TNT/truTV/Max	Kenny Albert	Eddie Olczyk	Brian Boucher	Darren Pang and Jackie Redmond	Liam McHugh	Anson Carter, Paul Bissonnette, Wayne Gretzky, and Chris Chelios
2025 Winter Classic	TNT/truTV/Max (Datacast)	John Forslund	Colby Armstrong and Mike Kelly	—N/a		Liam McHugh	Anson Carter, Paul Bissonnette, Wayne Gretzky, and Chris Chelios
2024 Stadium Series	ABC/ESPN+	Sean McDonough	Ray Ferraro		Emily Kaplan and Kevin Weekes	Steve Levy	Mark Messier and P. K. Subban
2024 Winter Classic	TNT/truTV/Max	Kenny Albert	Eddie Olczyk	Brian Boucher	Darren Pang and Jackie Redmond	Liam McHugh	Anson Carter, Paul Bissonnette, and Wayne Gretzky
2023 Heritage Classic	TBS/Max	John Forslund	Eddie Olczyk	—N/a	Anson Carter and Jackie Redmond	Liam McHugh	Brian Boucher
2023 Stadium Series	ABC/ESPN+	Sean McDonough	Ray Ferraro		Emily Kaplan, Kevin Weekes, and Marty Smith	Steve Levy	Mark Messier, Chris Chelios, and P. K. Subban
2023 Winter Classic	TNT	Kenny Albert	Eddie Olczyk	Keith Jones	Darren Pang and Jackie Redmond	Liam McHugh	Anson Carter, Rick Tocchet, Paul Bissonnette, Wayne Gretzky, and Keith Yandle
2022 Heritage Classic	TNT	Kenny Albert	Eddie Olczyk and Wayne Gretzky	Keith Jones		Liam McHugh	Anson Carter, Rick Tocchet, and Paul Bissonnette
2022 Stadium Series	TNT	Kenny Albert	Eddie Olczyk	Keith Jones	Jackie Redmond	Liam McHugh	Anson Carter, Rick Tocchet, Paul Bissonnette, and Wayne Gretzky
2022 Winter Classic	TNT	Kenny Albert	Keith Jones	Darren Pang	Jennifer Botterill	Liam McHugh	Anson Carter, Rick Tocchet, Paul Bissonnette, and Wayne Gretzky
2021 Outdoors at Lake Tahoe	NBCSN (Philadelphia–Boston)	Mike Tirico	Eddie Olczyk	Brian Boucher	Rutledge Wood	Mike Tirico	Eddie Olczyk
2021 Outdoors at Lake Tahoe	NBC (first period)/NBCSN (second and third periods) (Vegas-Colorado)	Mike Tirico	Eddie Olczyk	Brian Boucher	Rutledge Wood	Mike Tirico	Eddie Olczyk
2020 Stadium Series	NBC	Kenny Albert	Eddie Olczyk	Brian Boucher	Rutledge Wood	Kathryn Tappen	Patrick Sharp and Rutledge Wood
2020 Winter Classic	NBC	Mike Emrick	Eddie Olczyk	Pierre McGuire and Brian Boucher		Mike Tirico and Kathryn Tappen	Mike Milbury, Keith Jones, and Patrick Sharp
2019 Heritage Classic	NBCSN	Jim Hughson	Craig Simpson	—N/a	Scott Oake and Kelly Hrudey	Kathryn Tappen	Keith Jones and Anson Carter
2019 Stadium Series	NBC	Mike Emrick	Eddie Olczyk	Pierre McGuire	Jeremy Roenick	Liam McHugh	Mike Milbury, Keith Jones, and Jeremy Roenick
2019 Winter Classic	NBC	Mike Emrick	Eddie Olczyk	Pierre McGuire	Jeremy Roenick	Mike Tirico and Kathryn Tappen	Mike Milbury, Keith Jones, and Jeremy Roenick
2018 Stadium Series	NBC	Mike Emrick	Mike Milbury	Pierre McGuire	Jeremy Roenick	Kathryn Tappen	Jeremy Roenick and Keith Jones
2018 Winter Classic	NBC	Mike Emrick	Mike Milbury	Pierre McGuire	Jeremy Roenick	Liam McHugh	Keith Jones and Jeremy Roenick
2017 100 Classic	NBCSN	Jim Hughson	Craig Simpson	Garry Galley	Kyle Bukauskas	Kathryn Tappen	Keith Jones and Brian Boucher
2017 Stadium Series	NBC	Mike Emrick	Eddie Olczyk	Pierre McGuire	Jeremy Roenick	Liam McHugh	Mike Milbury, Keith Jones, and Jeremy Roenick
2017 Winter Classic	NBC	Mike Emrick	Eddie Olczyk	Pierre McGuire	Jeremy Roenick	Bob Costas and Liam McHugh	Mike Milbury, Keith Jones, and Jeremy Roenick
NHL Centennial Classic	NBC	John Forslund	Brian Boucher	Pierre McGuire		Kathryn Tappen	Jeremy Roenick
2016 Heritage Classic	NHL Network	Jim Hughson	Craig Simpson	—N/a	Scott Oake	David Amber	Kelly Hrudey, Nick Kypreos, and Elliotte Friedman
2016 Stadium Series (Denver)	NBC	Mike Emrick	Eddie Olczyk	Pierre McGuire	Jeremy Roenick	Kathryn Tappen	Jeremy Roenick
2016 Stadium Series (Minneapolis)	NBC	Mike Emrick	Eddie Olczyk	Pierre McGuire	Jeremy Roenick	Liam McHugh	Mike Milbury, Keith Jones, and Jeremy Roenick
2016 Winter Classic	NBC	Mike Emrick	Eddie Olczyk	Pierre McGuire	Jeremy Roenick	Liam McHugh	Mike Milbury, Keith Jones, and Jeremy Roenick
2015 Stadium Series	NBCSN	Dave Strader	Eddie Olczyk	Brian Engblom	Carolyn Manno	Kathryn Tappen	
2015 Winter Classic	NBC	Mike Emrick	Eddie Olczyk	Pierre McGuire	Jeremy Roenick	Liam McHugh	Mike Milbury, Keith Jones, and Jeremy Roenick
2014 Heritage Classic	NBCSN	Gord Miller	Brian Engblom			Kathryn Tappen	Jeremy Roenick
2014 Stadium Series (Chicago)	NBC	Mike Emrick	Eddie Olczyk	Pierre McGuire	Jeremy Roenick	Liam McHugh	Mike Milbury, Keith Jones, and Jeremy Roenick
2014 Stadium Series (New York)	NBC (New York Rangers–New Jersey)	Mike Emrick	Eddie Olczyk	Pierre McGuire	Jeremy Roenick	Liam McHugh	Mike Milbury, Keith Jones, and Jeremy Roenick
2014 Stadium Series (New York)	NBCSN (New York Rangers–New York Islanders)	Mike Emrick	Eddie Olczyk	Pierre McGuire	Jeremy Roenick	Liam McHugh	Mike Milbury, Keith Jones, and Jeremy Roenick
2014 Stadium Series (Los Angeles)	NBCSN	Dave Strader	Anson Carter	Brian Engblom	Jeremy Roenick	Russ Thaler	Jeremy Roenick and Anson Carter
2014 Winter Classic	NBC	Mike Emrick	Eddie Olczyk	Pierre McGuire	Jeremy Roenick	Liam McHugh	Mike Milbury, Keith Jones, and Jeremy Roenick
2012	NBC	Mike Emrick	Eddie Olczyk	Pierre McGuire and Darren Pang		Bob Costas	Mike Milbury
2011 Heritage Classic	Versus (now NBCSN)	Dave Strader	Andy Brickley	Brian Engblom		Bill Patrick	Keith Jones and Jeremy Roenick
2011 Winter Classic	NBC	Mike Emrick	Eddie Olczyk	Pierre McGuire and Darren Pang		Bob Costas	Mike Milbury
2010	NBC	Mike Emrick	Eddie Olczyk	Darren Pang		Bob Costas	Mike Milbury
2009	NBC	Dave Strader	Eddie Olczyk	Pierre McGuire and Darren Pang		Bob Costas	Mike Milbury
2008	NBC	Mike Emrick	Eddie Olczyk	Darren Pang		Bob Costas	Mike Milbury

=== Notes ===
- The first outdoor game between two NHL teams was an official pre-season match-up on September 27, 1991. The game took place in the parking lot of Caesars Palace in Las Vegas, Nevada, and featured the Los Angeles Kings and the New York Rangers. The game was televised live on Prime Ticket, and, due to its uniqueness, has since been repeated numerous times on other networks, such as MSG Network and the NHL Network. During the game, Kings goaltender Kelly Hrudey wore a camera mounted on his mask, and shots from his point of view were used during the broadcast.
- There was no separate American live telecast of the 2003 Heritage Classic. ESPN/ABC, the American rights-holder at the time, was already committed to broadcasting college football on its channels during that day. American viewers who wanted to watch the game live could view the Canadian CBC broadcast on NHL Center Ice.
- In 2008, some NBC affiliates decided instead to air the game on secondary channels often used for weather service. Therefore, in some markets, fans with a satellite service carrying DirecTV or DISH Network were unable to watch the game. Despite this, and competing with broadcasts of college football bowl games (this was particularly noted in the Detroit, Michigan market, usually a strong market for hockey ratings, where the Wolverines were playing in the Capital One Bowl), the game garnered a 2.6 rating and 5 share, the highest rating for a regular season NHL game since 1996, and the highest share since Wayne Gretzky's final game in 1999, in a near tie with second-place CBS' 2.7 rating for Gator Bowl coverage. The production earned a 38.1 rating in Buffalo and 17.7 rating in Pittsburgh, to lead all markets.
  - NBC had an airplane flying overhead to provide bird's-eye views of the rink, including a live webstream from its camera throughout the game. The announcers stood in a constructed perch on the penalty box side of the rink, in front of the stadium stands.
- In 2009, Dave Strader filled-in for Mike Emrick on play-by-play for NBC because Emrick had laryngitis.
  - On January 3, 2009, the NHL reported that the overnight television ratings had increased 12% over the 2008 game. Nationally, the game had 2.9 overnight rating and a 6 share. In Chicago, Thursday's game drew a national high of an 11.8 rating and 21 share, with Detroit second at 10.5 and 21 (this despite that yet again, a Michigan-based team was playing in the Capital One Bowl opposite the Winter Classic—this time the Michigan State Spartans). Other above-average markets included Buffalo (whose 10.1 rating/20 share was comparable to Detroit's), St. Louis (5.3/10), Pittsburgh (4.4/8), Denver (4.2/10), Providence (3.5/7), Indianapolis (3.4/6), West Palm Beach (3.3/6), and Orlando (3.2/5). Each overnight ratings point equals about 735,000 TV homes. On January 12, the final ratings figure was announced. There was an average of 4.4 million viewers of the game on NBC, and this was the largest since the February 23, 1975 match between the Philadelphia Flyers and the New York Rangers.
- The 2011 Winter Classic was delayed by seven hours due to rainy weather and ended up being played in prime time.
- The 2012, the 2017, and the 2023 games were all played on January 2 since January 1 landed on a Sunday.
- The 2013 game was cancelled on November 2, 2012, due to the 2012–13 NHL lockout.
- NHL Network simulcast Sportsnet's coverage of the 2016 Heritage Classic.
- NBCSN simulcast CBC and Sportsnet's coverage of the 2017 100 Classic and the 2019 Heritage Classic.
- The 2021 Vegas–Colorado outdoor game at Lake Tahoe was delayed for eight hours due to poor ice conditions. NBC aired the entire first period, but the rest of the game was broadcast on NBCSN. The Philadelphia–Boston game at Lake Tahoe was also delayed for the same reason, forcing NBC to move the game to primetime on NBCSN, and moved the originally scheduled Devils–Capitals game to NBC. The NHL Outdoors at Lake Tahoe special replaced the originally scheduled Winter Classic and Stadium Series due to the COVID-19 pandemic.
- On April 27, 2021, Turner Sports agreed to a seven-year deal with the National Hockey League to broadcast at least 72 games nationally on TNT and TBS beginning with the 2021–22 NHL season. The deal is reportedly worth $225 million and will include three Stanley Cup Finals, half of the conference finals, first and second round playoff games, and the Winter Classic.
- Eddie Olczyk missed the 2022 Winter Classic on TNT after being placed on COVID-19 protocol. Keith Jones replaced Olczyk in the booth while Darren Pang filled Jones' position as an ice level analyst.
- The 2022 Stadium Series was broadcast on TNT due to ABC's NBA coverage.
- The 2023 and 2024 Stadium Series was broadcast on ABC and ESPN+, airing them opposite the NBA All-Star Weekend on TNT.
- The 2023 Heritage Classic was broadcast on TBS due to TNT airing a women's international soccer friendly between the United States and Colombia. This marked TBS' first NHL regular season broadcast. In addition, John Forslund filled in for Kenny Albert who was on assignment for the NFL on Fox calling the Minnesota Vikings at the Green Bay Packers.
- The 2025 Winter Classic was played on New Year's Eve (December 31, 2024) in order to avoid competing with the expanded College Football Playoff games on ESPN and ABC.
- The 2025 Stadium Series was broadcast on ESPN due to ABC airing the Golden State Warriors–Philadelphia 76ers NBA game.
- The 2026 Stadium Series was broadcast on ESPN due to ABC airing a college basketball doubleheader. The Stadium Series served as a lead-out program to the Milwaukee Bucks–Boston Celtics NBA game.

=== See also ===
- Ratings in the United States

== Canada (English) ==
Year	Network	Play-by-play	Colour commentator(s)	Ice-level analyst(s)	Rinkside reporter(s)	Studio host	Studio analyst(s)
2026 Heritage Classic	Sportsnet	Chris Cuthbert	Craig Simpson	Kyle Bukauskas		Ron MacLean	Elliotte Friedman, Colby Armstrong, and Kevin Bieksa
2026 Stadium Series	Sportsnet	Sean McDonough	Ray Ferraro		Emily Kaplan and Kevin Weekes	Steve Levy	Mark Messier and P. K. Subban
2026 Winter Classic	Sportsnet	Kenny Albert	Eddie Olczyk	Brian Boucher	Darren Pang and Jackie Redmond	Liam McHugh	Anson Carter, Paul Bissonnette, Wayne Gretzky, and Henrik Lundqvist
2025 Stadium Series	FX	Sean McDonough	Ray Ferraro		Emily Kaplan, Kevin Weekes, and Marty Smith	Steve Levy	Mark Messier and P. K. Subban
2025 Winter Classic	Sportsnet	Kenny Albert	Eddie Olczyk	Brian Boucher	Darren Pang and Jackie Redmond	Liam McHugh	Anson Carter, Paul Bissonnette, Wayne Gretzky, and Chris Chelios
2024 Stadium Series	SN One (Philadelphia–New Jersey)	Sean McDonough	Ray Ferraro		Emily Kaplan and Kevin Weekes	Steve Levy	Mark Messier and P. K. Subban
2024 Stadium Series	Sportsnet (New York Rangers–New York Islanders)	Sean McDonough	Ray Ferraro		Emily Kaplan and Kevin Weekes	Steve Levy	Mark Messier and P. K. Subban
2024 Winter Classic	Sportsnet	Kenny Albert	Eddie Olczyk	Brian Boucher	Darren Pang and Jackie Redmond	Liam McHugh	Anson Carter, Paul Bissonnette, and Wayne Gretzky
2023 Heritage Classic	Sportsnet	Chris Cuthbert	Craig Simpson	Kyle Bukauskas		Ron MacLean and David Amber	Kelly Hrudey, Elliotte Friedman, Jennifer Botterill, and Kevin Bieksa
2023 Stadium Series	SN360	Sean McDonough	Ray Ferraro		Emily Kaplan, Kevin Weekes, and Marty Smith	Steve Levy	Mark Messier, Chris Chelios, and P. K. Subban
2023 Winter Classic	Sportsnet	Kenny Albert	Eddie Olczyk	Keith Jones	Darren Pang and Jackie Redmond	Liam McHugh	Anson Carter, Rick Tocchet, Paul Bissonnette, Wayne Gretzky, and Keith Yandle
2022 Heritage Classic	Sportsnet	Chris Cuthbert	Craig Simpson	Kyle Bukauskas		Ron MacLean and David Amber	Kelly Hrudey, Elliotte Friedman, Jennifer Botterill, and Kevin Bieksa
2022 Stadium Series	SN360	Kenny Albert	Eddie Olczyk	Keith Jones	Jackie Redmond	Liam McHugh	Anson Carter, Rick Tocchet, Paul Bissonnette, and Wayne Gretzky
2022 Winter Classic	SN One	Kenny Albert	Keith Jones	Darren Pang	Jennifer Botterill	Liam McHugh	Anson Carter, Rick Tocchet, Paul Bissonnette, and Wayne Gretzky
2021 Outdoors at Lake Tahoe	Sportsnet (Philadelphia–Boston)	Mike Tirico	Eddie Olczyk	Brian Boucher	Rutledge Wood	Mike Tirico	Eddie Olczyk
2021 Outdoors at Lake Tahoe	Sportsnet (Vegas–Colorado)	Mike Tirico	Eddie Olczyk	Brian Boucher	Rutledge Wood	Mike Tirico	Eddie Olczyk
2020 Stadium Series	Sportsnet 360	Kenny Albert	Eddie Olczyk	Brian Boucher	Rutledge Wood	Kathryn Tappen	Patrick Sharp and Rutledge Wood
2020 Winter Classic	Sportsnet	Mike Emrick	Eddie Olczyk	Pierre McGuire and Brian Boucher		Mike Tirico and Kathryn Tappen	Mike Milbury, Keith Jones, and Patrick Sharp
2019 Heritage Classic	CBC	Jim Hughson	Craig Simpson	Scott Oake and Kelly Hrudey		Ron MacLean	Don Cherry, Kelly Hrudey, Brian Burke, and Elliotte Friedman
2019 Heritage Classic	Sportsnet	Jim Hughson	Craig Simpson	Scott Oake and Kelly Hrudey		Ron MacLean	Don Cherry, Kelly Hrudey, Brian Burke, and Elliotte Friedman
2019 Stadium Series	Sportsnet One	Mike Emrick	Eddie Olczyk	Pierre McGuire	Jeremy Roenick	Liam McHugh	Mike Milbury, Keith Jones, and Jeremy Roenick
2019 Stadium Series	Sportsnet 360	Mike Emrick	Eddie Olczyk	Pierre McGuire	Jeremy Roenick	Liam McHugh	Mike Milbury, Keith Jones, and Jeremy Roenick
2019 Winter Classic	Sportsnet	Mike Emrick	Eddie Olczyk	Pierre McGuire	Jeremy Roenick	Mike Tirico and Kathryn Tappen	Mike Milbury, Keith Jones, and Jeremy Roenick
2018 Stadium Series	CBC	Jim Hughson	Craig Simpson	Kyle Bukauskas		Ron MacLean	Don Cherry, Kelly Hrudey, Nick Kypreos, and Elliotte Friedman
2018 Stadium Series	Sportsnet	Jim Hughson	Craig Simpson	Kyle Bukauskas		Ron MacLean	Don Cherry, Kelly Hrudey, Nick Kypreos, and Elliotte Friedman
2018 Winter Classic	Sportsnet	Mike Emrick	Mike Milbury	Pierre McGuire	Jeremy Roenick	Liam McHugh	Keith Jones and Jeremy Roenick
NHL 100 Classic	CBC	Jim Hughson	Craig Simpson	Garry Galley	Kyle Bukauskas	Ron MacLean	Don Cherry, Kelly Hrudey, Nick Kypreos, and Elliotte Friedman
NHL 100 Classic	Sportsnet	Jim Hughson	Craig Simpson	Garry Galley	Kyle Bukauskas	Ron MacLean	Don Cherry, Kelly Hrudey, Nick Kypreos, and Elliotte Friedman
2017 Stadium Series	Sportsnet	Mike Emrick	Eddie Olczyk	Pierre McGuire	Jeremy Roenick	Liam McHugh	Mike Milbury, Keith Jones, and Jeremy Roenick
2017 Winter Classic	Sportsnet	Mike Emrick	Eddie Olczyk	Pierre McGuire	Jeremy Roenick	Bob Costas and Liam McHugh	Mike Milbury, Keith Jones, and Jeremy Roenick
NHL Centennial Classic	Sportsnet	Jim Hughson	Craig Simpson	Scott Oake		Ron MacLean	Don Cherry, Kelly Hrudey, Nick Kypreos, and Elliotte Friedman
2016 Heritage Classic	Sportsnet	Jim Hughson	Craig Simpson	Scott Oake		David Amber	Kelly Hrudey, Nick Kypreos, and Elliotte Friedman
2016 Stadium Series (Denver)	Sportsnet	Mike Emrick	Eddie Olczyk	Pierre McGuire	Jeremy Roenick	Kathryn Tappen	Jeremy Roenick
2016 Stadium Series (Minneapolis)	Sportsnet	Mike Emrick	Eddie Olczyk	Pierre McGuire	Jeremy Roenick	Liam McHugh	Mike Milbury, Keith Jones, and Jeremy Roenick
2016 Winter Classic	Sportsnet	Jim Hughson	Craig Simpson	Glenn Healy	Scott Oake	George Stroumboulopoulos	Nick Kypreos and Elliotte Friedman
2015 Stadium Series	CBC	Paul Romanuk	Mike Johnson	Kelly Hrudey	Cassie Campbell-Pascall	George Stroumboulopoulos	Elliotte Friedman
2015 Winter Classic	CBC	Jim Hughson	Craig Simpson	Glenn Healy	Scott Oake	George Stroumboulopoulos	Nick Kypreos
2014 Heritage Classic	CBC	Jim Hughson	Kelly Hrudey	Glenn Healy	Cassie Campbell-Pascall	Ron MacLean	Don Cherry
2014 Stadium Series (New York)	CBC	Jim Hughson	Craig Simpson	Glenn Healy	Cassie Campbell-Pascall	Ron MacLean	Don Cherry
2014 Stadium Series (Los Angeles)	CBC	Mark Lee	Kelly Hrudey	Brian Hayward	Scott Oake	Ron MacLean	Don Cherry
2014 Winter Classic	CBC	Jim Hughson	Craig Simpson	Glenn Healy	Scott Oake and Andi Petrillo	Ron MacLean	Don Cherry, P. J. Stock, Kevin Weekes, and Elliotte Friedman
2012	CBC	Jim Hughson	Craig Simpson	Glenn Healy	Elliotte Friedman	Ron MacLean	Don Cherry
2011 Heritage Classic	CBC	Jim Hughson	Craig Simpson	Glenn Healy	Elliotte Friedman	Ron MacLean	Don Cherry
2011 Winter Classic	CBC	Jim Hughson	Craig Simpson	Glenn Healy	Elliotte Friedman	Ron MacLean	Don Cherry
2010	CBC	Jim Hughson	Craig Simpson	Glenn Healy	Elliotte Friedman	Ron MacLean	Don Cherry
2009	CBC	Jim Hughson	Craig Simpson	Greg Millen	Elliotte Friedman	Ron MacLean	Don Cherry
2008	CBC	Jim Hughson	Craig Simpson	Greg Millen	Elliotte Friedman	Ron MacLean	Don Cherry
2003	CBC	Chris Cuthbert	Greg Millen and Glenn Healy	Elliotte Friedman and Steve Armitage		Ron MacLean	Don Cherry

=== Notes ===
- The CBC television broadcast of the 2003 Heritage Classic set the record for most viewers of a single NHL game with 2.747 million nationwide. This was the first NHL game broadcast in HD on CBC.
  - Despite the overwhelming popularity of the original Heritage Classic between the Montreal Canadiens and the Edmonton Oilers in 2003, the popularity of the Winter Classic in Canada is low and declining. On Canada's CBC Television network, the Winter Classic has lower ratings than its weekly regular season telecasts Hockey Night in Canada. This has been attributed to the lack of Canadian teams in any of the Winter Classics and has led to a revival of the all-Canadian Heritage Classic.
- In 2011, the seven-hour delay on the CBC broadcast schedule caused the classic to be completely preempted in the province of Ontario. The network's coverage of the NHL that night began with the Battle of Ontario at Scotiabank Place in Ottawa at 7 p.m. ET, and broke away to the Classic outside Ontario. The CBC truncated the broadcast after two hours in Alberta to show the Battle of Alberta at Rexall Place in Edmonton in its entirety.
- TSN simulcasted NBCSN's coverage of the 2014 Stadium Series game between the Rangers and the Islanders.
  - There was no separate Canadian live telecast of the 2014 Stadium Series game in Chicago. CBC instead broadcast the Toronto Maple Leafs–Montreal Canadiens game being played at the same time.
- The 2019 Heritage Classic was the last outdoor NHL game to air on CBC. From 2022 onward, every Heritage Classic and any outdoor game featuring at least one Canadian team became exclusive to Sportsnet.
- Since 2016, Sportsnet uses the American broadcast feed in its broadcasts of the Winter Classic and Stadium Series, except when either game involves a Canadian-based team.
  - The NBC feed of the 2019 Stadium Series was instead aired on Sportsnet One and Sportsnet 360. The Montreal Canadiens–Toronto Maple Leafs game that was being played at the same time was being simulcast on both CBC and Sportsnet.
  - The NBC feed of the 2020 Stadium Series was instead aired on Sportsnet 360. The Toronto Maple Leafs–Ottawa Senators game that was being played at the same time was being simulcast on both CBC and Sportsnet.
  - The TNT feed of the 2022 Winter Classic was instead aired on Sportsnet One. The Toronto Maple Leafs–Ottawa Senators game that was being played at the same time was being simulcast on both CBC and Sportsnet.
  - The TNT feed of the 2022 Stadium Series was instead aired on Sportsnet 360. The Toronto Maple Leafs–Detroit Red Wings game that was being played at the same time was being simulcast on both CBC and Sportsnet.
  - The ABC feed of the 2023 Stadium Series was instead aired on Sportsnet 360. The Montreal Canadiens–Toronto Maple Leafs game that was being played at the same time was being simulcast on both CBC and Sportsnet.
  - The ABC feed of the 2024 Stadium Series (Philadelphia Flyers–New Jersey Devils) was instead aired on Sportsnet One. The Anaheim Ducks–Toronto Maple Leafs game that was being played at the same time was being simulcast on CBC, Sportsnet Ontario, Sportsnet Pacific and Sportsnet West, while the Washington Capitals–Montreal Canadiens game was being simulcast on Citytv and Sportsnet East.
  - The ESPN feed of the 2025 Stadium Series was instead aired on FX. The Montreal Canadiens–Buffalo Sabres game that was being played at the same time was being simulcast on Citytv and Sportsnet East, the San Jose Sharks–Ottawa Senators game was being simulcast on Sportsnet One, the Edmonton Oilers–Carolina Hurricanes game was being simulcast on CBC, Sportsnet Ontario and Sportsnet Pacific, and the Philadelphia Flyers–Winnipeg Jets game was being simulcast on Sportsnet West.

== Canada (French) ==
Year	Network	Play-by-play	Colour commentator	Ice level reporters	Studio host	Studio analysts
2026 Heritage Classic	TVA Sports	Felix Seguin	Patrick Lalime	Renaud Lavoie		
2026 Stadium Series	TVA Sports	Denis Casavant	Patrick Lalime			
2026 Winter Classic	TVA Sports	Felix Seguin	Alexandre Picard	Renaud Lavoie		
2025 Stadium Series	TVA Sports	J.P. Bertrand	Mathieu Chouinard			
2025 Winter Classic	TVA Sports	Denis Casavant	Alain Chainey	Renaud Lavoie		
2024 Stadium Series	TVA Sports (Philadelphia–New Jersey)	Nicolas St-Pierre	Mathieu Chouinard			
2024 Stadium Series	TVA Sports (New York Rangers–New York Islanders)	Felix Seguin	Alain Chainey			
2024 Winter Classic	TVA Sports	Denis Casavant	Alexandre Picard			
2023 Heritage Classic	TVA Sports	Nicolas St-Pierre	Alain Chainey	Renaud Lavoie		
2023 Stadium Series	TVA Sports 2	Denis Casavant	Alexandre Picard			
2023 Winter Classic	TVA Sports	Denis Casavant	Alain Chainey			
2022 Heritage Classic	TVA Sports	Denis Casavant	Yvon Pedneault			
2022 Stadium Series	TVA Sports 2	Sebastien Goulet	Alain Chainey			
2022 Winter Classic	TVA Sports	Félix Séguin	Yvon Pedneault			
2021 Outdoors at Lake Tahoe	TVA Sports (Philadelphia–Boston)	Sebastien Goulet	Alain Chainey			
2021 Outdoors at Lake Tahoe	TVA Sports (Vegas–Colorado)	Sebastien Goulet	Alain Chainey			
2020 Stadium Series	TVA Sports 2	Sebastien Goulet	Alain Chainey			
2020 Winter Classic	TVA Sports	Felix Seguin	Alain Chainey			
2019 Heritage Classic	TVA Sports 2	Sebastien Goulet	Yvon Pedneault			
2019 Stadium Series	TVA Sports 2	Denis Casavant	Alain Chainey			
2019 Winter Classic	TVA Sports	Felix Seguin	Alain Chainey			
2018 Stadium Series	TVA Sports	Denis Casavant	Yvon Pedneault			
2018 Winter Classic	TVA Sports	Felix Seguin	Alain Chainey			
2017 100 Classic	TVA Sports	Felix Seguin	Patrick Lalime	Renaud Lavoie and Marc-Andre Perreault		
2017 Stadium Series	TVA Sports 2	Sebastien Goulet	Yvon Pedneault			
2017 Winter Classic	TVA Sports	Felix Seguin	Yvon Pedneault			
2017 Centennial Classic	TVA Sports	Denis Casavant	Alain Chainey	Mathieu Dandenault	Frederic Lord	
2016 Heritage Classic	TVA Sports 2	Sebastien Goulet	Yvon Pedneault			
2016 Stadium Series (Denver)	TVA Sports 2	Sebastien Goulet	Eric Fichaud			
2016 Stadium Series (Minneapolis)	TVA Sports	Denis Casavant	Alain Chainey			
2016 Winter Classic	TVA Sports	Felix Seguin	Patrick Lalime	Renaud Lavoie		
2015 Stadium Series	TVA Sports 2	Denis Casavant	Yvon Pedneault			
2015 Winter Classic	TVA Sports	Felix Seguin	Patrick Lalime	Renaud Lavoie		
2014 Heritage Classic	RDS	Michel Y. Lacroix	Norman Flynn			
2014 Winter Classic	RDS	Michel Y. Lacroix	Norman Flynn	Renaud Lavoie		
2012	RDS	Michel Y. Lacroix	Denis Gauthier	Renaud Lavoie	Claude Mailhot	Jocelyn Lemieux
2011 Heritage Classic	RDS	Pierre Houde	Benoit Brunet	Joel Bouchard	Alain Crete	Mario Tremblay
2011 Winter Classic	RDS	Michel Y. Lacroix	Denis Gauthier	Renaud Lavoie	Yanick Bouchard	Jocelyn Lemieux
2010	RDS	Michel Y. Lacroix	Norman Flynn	Renaud Lavoie	Yanick Bouchard	Bob Hartley
2009	RDS	Pierre Houde	Benoit Brunet	Chantal Machabee	Alain Crete	Michel Bergeron, Joel Bouchard, and Jacques Demers
2008	RDS	Pierre Houde	Yvon Pedneault	Chantal Machabee	Alain Crete	Benoit Brunet, Michel Bergeron and Jacques Demers
2003	RDS and SRC (simulcast)	Pierre Houde	Yvon Pedneault			

=== Notes ===
- On November 26, 2013, Rogers announced that it had reached a 12-year, $5.2 billion deal to become the exclusive national rightsholder for the National Hockey League, beginning in the 2014–15 season. Quebecor Media sub-licensed national French-language rights to the league for $110 million per season, making TVA Sports the official French-language cable broadcaster of the NHL. RDS retains regional rights to Montreal Canadiens games not broadcast by TVA Sports. Former Montreal Canadiens goalie José Theodore joined the network as an analyst. NHL games occupy a significant portion of TVA Sports' programming, with a particular emphasis on the Canadiens and other teams popular in Quebec, such as the Boston Bruins, Colorado Avalanche, Pittsburgh Penguins, and Toronto Maple Leafs. Certain nights will feature themed selections of games, such as a viewers' choice game on Monday nights, rivalry games, and games focusing on star players. TVA Sports' flagship Saturday night broadcast, La super soirée LNH, will air 22 Montreal Canadiens games per season, along with a second game on TVA Sports 2. TVA Sports also airs the All-Star Game, Winter Classic, and Stanley Cup Playoffs.

== Finnish television ==
Year	Network	Play-by-play
2011	Nelonen Pro 1	Antti Makinen
