= NHL on RDS =

Television series

Réseau des sports (RDS) is a French Canadian cable specialty channel that broadcasts National Hockey League games.

== Background ==
In 2003, the Montreal Canadiens announced a deal to license its French-language broadcast rights for all of its preseason, season, and playoff games to RDS. This was controversial as it threatened the longest-running television show in Quebec, Radio-Canada's La Soirée du hockey. Days later, an agreement was reached whereby RDS and Radio-Canada would simultaneously broadcast Canadiens games on Saturday nights, saving the show. Within the province of Quebec, this arrangement stopped after the 2003–04 NHL season, and French-language Canadiens broadcasts now air only on RDS. Simulcasted coverage continued in regions that do not receive RDS on analog TV (all of Canada south/west of the Ottawa Region) on Radio-Canada until the 2006–07 NHL season. In addition to Canadiens games, RDS also televised a smaller package of Ottawa Senators games, which appear on either RDS or RDS Info as well as other games. RDS also had the French-language rights to the Stanley Cup playoffs and Finals through 2014, regardless of which teams participated.

=== Contract details ===
At the end of July 2007, RDS and the Montreal Canadiens extended their exclusive broadcasting rights contract through 2013. The deal included all of the Canadiens' 82 regular season games and all of their playoff games, if need be (none of this precludes CBC Sports from televising games in English as part of Hockey Night in Canada). Also, RDS had exclusive rights to French television broadcasting rights for the NHL All-Star Game and Skills Competition, as well as one NHL game per week that did not involve the Canadiens and a minimum of 40 playoff games for either RDS or RDS Info. The Canadiens also granted RDS exclusive rights to 'new media' coverage for the team (i.e., cell-phone TV, podcast and others).

Most other broadcast contracts were acquired through TSN and ESPN.

On November 26, 2013, Rogers Communications, the parent company of Sportsnet announced that it had reached a 12-year, $5.2 billion deal to become the exclusive national rightsholder for the National Hockey League, beginning in the 2014–15 season, and would sub-license exclusive French-language rights to TVA and TVA Sports, replacing RDS. Previously, due to RDS's position as national French rightsholder, the Canadiens forwent a separate regional rights deal and allowed its games to be part of the national French package. Under the new contract, RDS maintained its broadcast rights to 60 Canadiens games per season under a 12-year deal, but Canadiens games are now subject to blackout outside of the Canadiens home market region. In January 2014, as part of a wider media rights deal with Bell Media, RDS also obtained regional broadcast rights to the Ottawa Senators, with 40 regional games in French per season. The contract also includes English-language television and radio rights for TSN and CFGO.

== Theme music ==
In June 2008, RDS's parent, CTV Inc., acquired the rights to "The Hockey Theme" after the CBC decided not to renew its rights to the theme song. A re-orchestrated version of the tune, which has been the theme song of La Soirée du hockey and Hockey Night in Canada since 1968, will be used for hockey broadcasts on RDS and TSN beginning in the fall of 2008.

== Commentators ==
=== Current ===
- David Arsenault - Ottawa Senators host
- Andree-Ann Barbeau - Ottawa Senators host
- Benoit Brunet - Montreal Canadiens studio analyst
- Guy Carbonneau - Montreal Canadiens studio analyst
- Alain Crete - Montreal Canadiens host
- Vincent Damphousse - Montreal Canadiens studio analyst
- Marc Denis - Montreal Canadiens colour commentator
- Norman Flynn - Ottawa Senators colour commentator
- Denis Gauthier - Ottawa / Montreal Studio analyst
- Luc Gelinas - Montreal Canadiens beat reporter
- Bruno Gervais - Ottawa / Montreal Studio analyst
- Pierre Houde - Montreal Canadiens play-by-play
- Michel Y. Lacroix - Ottawa Senators play-by-play
- Jocelyn Lemieux - Ottawa Senators studio Analyst
- Chantal Machabee - Montreal Canadiens beat reporter
- Mario Tremblay - Montreal Canadiens studio analyst

=== Former ===
- Michel Bergeron - Montreal Canadiens analyst (2008–2010)
- Joel Bouchard - Montreal Canadiens studio analyst/rinkside reporter
- Yanick Bouchard - Le Hockey Bud Light de la LNH host
- Denis Casavant - Play-by-Play
- Jacques Demers - Montreal Canadiens analyst (2000–2010)
- Bob Hartley - Ottawa Senators colour commentator/Le Hockey Bud Light de la LNH analyst (2008–2010)
- Renaud Lavoie - Montreal Canadiens interviewer
- Patrick Lalime - Le Hockey Bud Light de la LNH/Ottawa Senators Analyst
- Claude Mailhot - Ottawa Senators studio host
- Dave Morissette - Ottawa Senators analyst
- Sylvain Pedneault - Montreal Canadiens player profiler
- Yvon Pedneault - Montreal Canadiens colour commentator (1998–2008)
- Felix Seguin - Le Hockey Bud Light de la LNH play-by-play

Preceded by SRC	NHL French network broadcast partner in Canada; 2002–2014	Succeeded by TVA Sports
