= Liam McHugh =

American television sportscaster (born 1977)

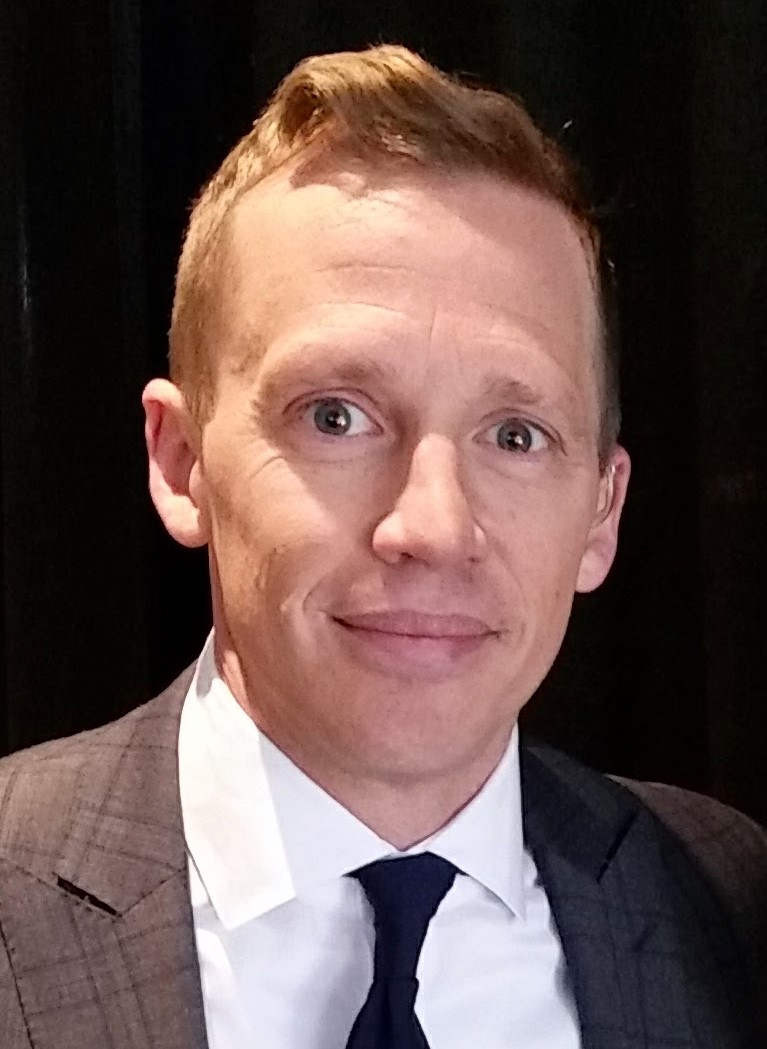
- McHugh in 2017
- Born: November 2, 1977 (age 49)
- Education: University at Buffalo; Syracuse University
- Occupation: Television sportscaster

Liam McHugh (born November 2, 1977) is an American television sportscaster. He is a studio host for the NHL on TNT. He previously worked on NBC Sports coverage of the NHL as well as Notre Dame Fighting Irish football and Sunday Night Football, as well as MLS Season Pass on Apple TV. He was also perhaps the face of NBCSN, anchoring much of its staple programming, including the NHL, Tour De France, college football, college basketball and the Premier League, prior to joining TNT Sports.

== Early life and education ==
McHugh grew up in Williston Park on Long Island and played basketball and soccer at Herricks High School. His father, Frank McHugh, was a long-time track coach at a different high school on Long Island called Elmont. McHugh graduated from the University at Buffalo and received his master's degree from Syracuse University's S. I. Newhouse School of Public Communications in 2004.

== Career ==
Prior to joining NBC, he worked at Newsday (1999-2001), WTHI in Terre Haute, Indiana (2004-2007), KOKH in Oklahoma City, Oklahoma (2007-2009), and ESPN The Magazine (2001-2007). On April 5, 2010, The Daily Line debuted with McHugh as host. The show consisted of a four-person panel (host McHugh, handicapper Rob DeAngelis, comedian Reese Waters, and former Playboy bunny Jenn Sterger) which discussed, often with heavy satire, sports-related topics popular that day and aired on Versus. However, the show was canceled due to low viewership on November 4, 2010. McHugh would be retained by the network to originally work on NHL coverage, mostly on NHL Overtime and Hockey Central.

In 2011, McHugh began the year as the host of NHL Live, the network's pre- and post-game show that airs before and after each NHL telecast. He also contributed to NBC's Stanley Cup coverage, hosting Games 1 and 2. In the summer of 2011, McHugh stepped into the role of host for NBC's live daily coverage of the Tour de France. In the fall, he contributed to NBCSN's college football coverage as the host of the newly created College Football Talk, a weekly wrap up show. Additionally, he served each week as the host for the network's studio show before and after game coverage.

2012 saw McHugh return to NBC and NBCSN’s coverage of the NHL as lead studio host. He hosted NHL Live several times weekly and the NHL on NBC intermission report weekly. He finished off the 2011-2012 NHL season in his biggest role to date, hosting every game of the 2012 Stanley Cup Final. He served as a reporter for NBC's Super Bowl XLVI pre-game coverage. McHugh expanded his portfolio even further as he was to be a part of NBC Sports's coverage of the 2012 Summer Olympics.

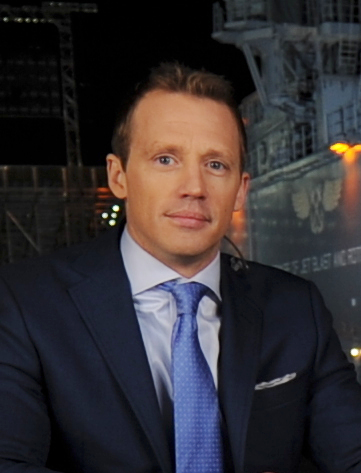
McHugh at the 2012 Navy Marine Corps Classic

McHugh hosted the afternoon action on NBCSN daily throughout the games. In the fall, he continued to host NBC's college football studio show alongside Doug Flutie and newcomer Hines Ward. In November 2012, McHugh hosted NBCSN’s Carrier Classic Countdown, live from the deck of the USS Bataan, as well as pre-game, halftime and post-game coverage. He made his Winter Olympics debut as a hockey host at the 2014 Olympic Winter Games in Sochi for NBC.

For the final 6 weeks of the 2015-2016 Premier League season, McHugh filled in as the lead studio host for the Monday afternoon Premier League games while Rebecca Lowe was on maternity leave. He continued in that capacity for the next five Premier League seasons when he has no NHL responsibilities for NBCSN.

During the 2017 NFL season, McHugh was named the new studio host for NBC’s joint coverage of Thursday Night Football with NFL Network. He replaced Bob Costas, who stepped down from most of his on-air roles at NBC, including the Olympics.

Shortly before Super Bowl LII, it was announced that McHugh would join Dan Patrick as a studio co-host for the game, filling in for Mike Tirico as the latter prepared to anchor the 2018 Winter Olympics, set to open a few days later. McHugh later joined Football Night in America full-time starting with the 2018 NFL season, taking Tirico’s spot, as Tirico moved to the studio to replace the departed Patrick.

Following NBC's last Stanley Cup Final and their coverage of the 2020 Summer Olympics, McHugh departed NBC to join TNT Sports for their NHL coverage. McHugh joined Kenny Albert, Brendan Burke, Eddie Olczyk, Keith Jones, Anson Carter, and John Forslund, who all jumped from NBC to TNT. McHugh's on-site position on Football Night in America was filled by Jac Collinsworth.

In 2023, McHugh was named to Apple TV’s MLS Season Pass broadcast team, as the lead host of their whiparound studio coverage. McHugh continued on as TNT’s NHL studio host. He left Apple TV following the 2024 season.
