= Al Strachan =

Canadian sports author and journalist

- Occupations: journalist, author
- Employer(s): Montreal Gazette; The Globe and Mail; Toronto Sun
- Awards: Elmer Ferguson Memorial Award

Alan Strachan is a Canadian sports author and journalist. A former sports columnist for The Globe and Mail, Montreal Gazette, and Toronto Sun, he won the Elmer Ferguson Memorial Award in 1993 and is a member of the media section of the Hockey Hall of Fame. He is also a former panelist on Hockey Night in Canada and analyst on The Score.

== Career ==
Strachan joined the Montreal Gazette as a journalist in 1973 while also working as a radio show host in Montreal. While working for the Gazette, Strachan was promoted to sports editor. He subsequently hired Glenn Cole in 1977 to fill his former position. In 1980, Strachan joined The Globe and Mail where he was the 1993 recipient of the Elmer Ferguson Memorial Award. He was likewise named a lifetime member of the Professional Hockey Writers Association. A year later, in 1994, Strachan was hired by the Toronto Sun. He worked for the Sun until 2006 when it was announced his contract would not be renewed.

Throughout his career, Strachan worked a panellist on Hockey Night in Canada. This was cut short in 2005 when he was fired from Hockey Night in Canada's Satellite Hot Stove panel. Although the full reason was unknown, Strachan stated it was because "they said it was time to change direction." This did not deter Strachan from continuing his sports journalism career. In 2008, Strachan collaborated with Don Cherry to write Don Cherry's Hockey Stories and Stuff.

Shortly after the release of his book Why The Leafs Suck: And How They Can Be Fixed in 2009, Strachan was let go from Hockey Night in Canada a second time. CBC stated this was because the cover of the book portrayed Strachan with a Hockey Night in Canada tag without permission. He subsequently moved back to St. Andrews, New Brunswick before Thanksgiving.

In 2010, Strachan published a book titled "I am not making this up: my favourite hockey stories from a career covering the game" which detailed untold stories from his career in hockey journalism. A year later, his book "Over the line: wrist shots, slap shots, and five-minute majors" published more insight into inside stories and anecdotes from his career.

== Publications ==
The following is a list of publications:

- 100 years of hockey: the chronicle of a century on ice (1999)
- Why the Leafs suck and how they can be fixed (2009)
- Don Cherry's Hockey Stories and Stuff (2009)
- I am not making this up: my favourite hockey stories from a career covering the game (2010)
- Over the line: wrist shots, slap shots, and five-minute majors (2011)
- 99, Gretzky: his game, his story (2013)

== Personal life ==
Strachan is married and has two sons. Despite his career in hockey, Strachan stated his wife kept their son out of hockey due to the violence.
