= Sébastien Goulet =

Canadian tennis commentator

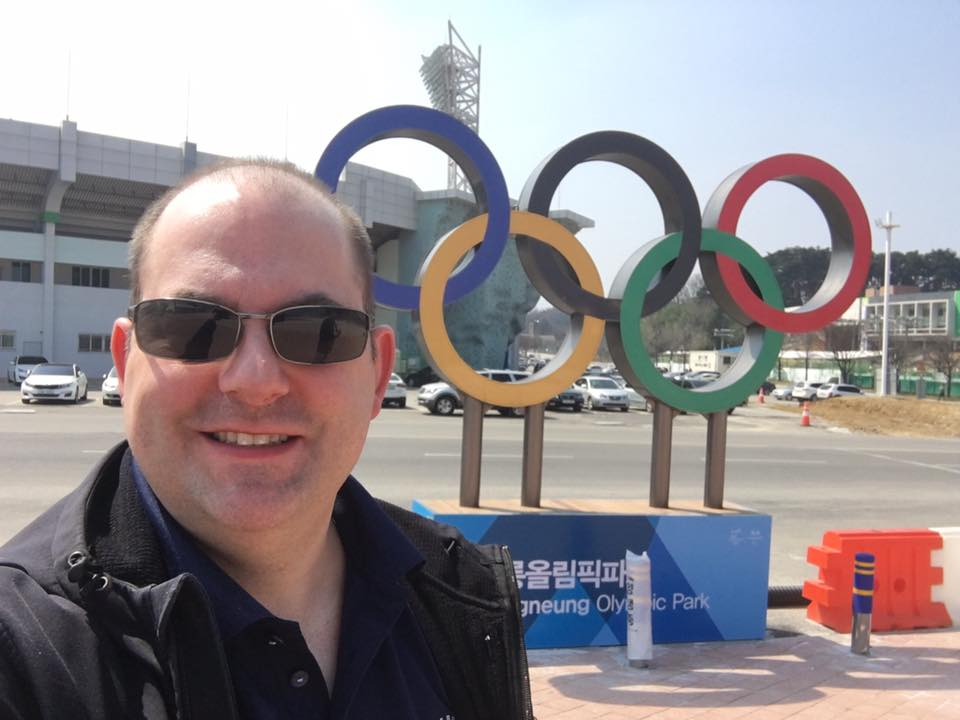
Sébastien Goulet

Sébastien Goulet (born 1977 in Sherbrooke, Quebec) is a play-by-play commentator. Currently employed by TVA Sports, he works National Hockey League games as well as WTA Tour tennis.

He has also done play-by-play at the 2017 IIHF U20 World Championships for the Cogeco radio network.

== Public Address Announcer ==
He has been the alternate to Michel Lacroix as public address announcer of the Montreal Canadiens since 2002 and has also MC'd numerous events at the Bell Centre.

He has served as public address announcer for ice hockey at the 2006 Winter Olympics in Turin, the 2010 Winter Olympics in Vancouver, the 2014 Winter Olympics in Sochi, the 2018 Winter Olympics in PyeongChang, the 2022 Winter Olympics in Beijing and the 2026 Winter Olympics in Milan. He has also served as announcer at the boxing and weightlifting competitions at the 2016 Summer Olympics in Rio de Janeiro.

He has also worked at the 2015 and 2017 IIHF U20 World Championships, the 2019 IIHF U18 World Championships - Division IA in Gangneung, South Korea.

In 2019, he also worked at the WBSC Softball Americas Qualifier in Surrey, and has since been the announcer for the Canada Cup International Softball Tournament.
