= Keith Jones (ice hockey) =

Canadian ice hockey player (born 1968)

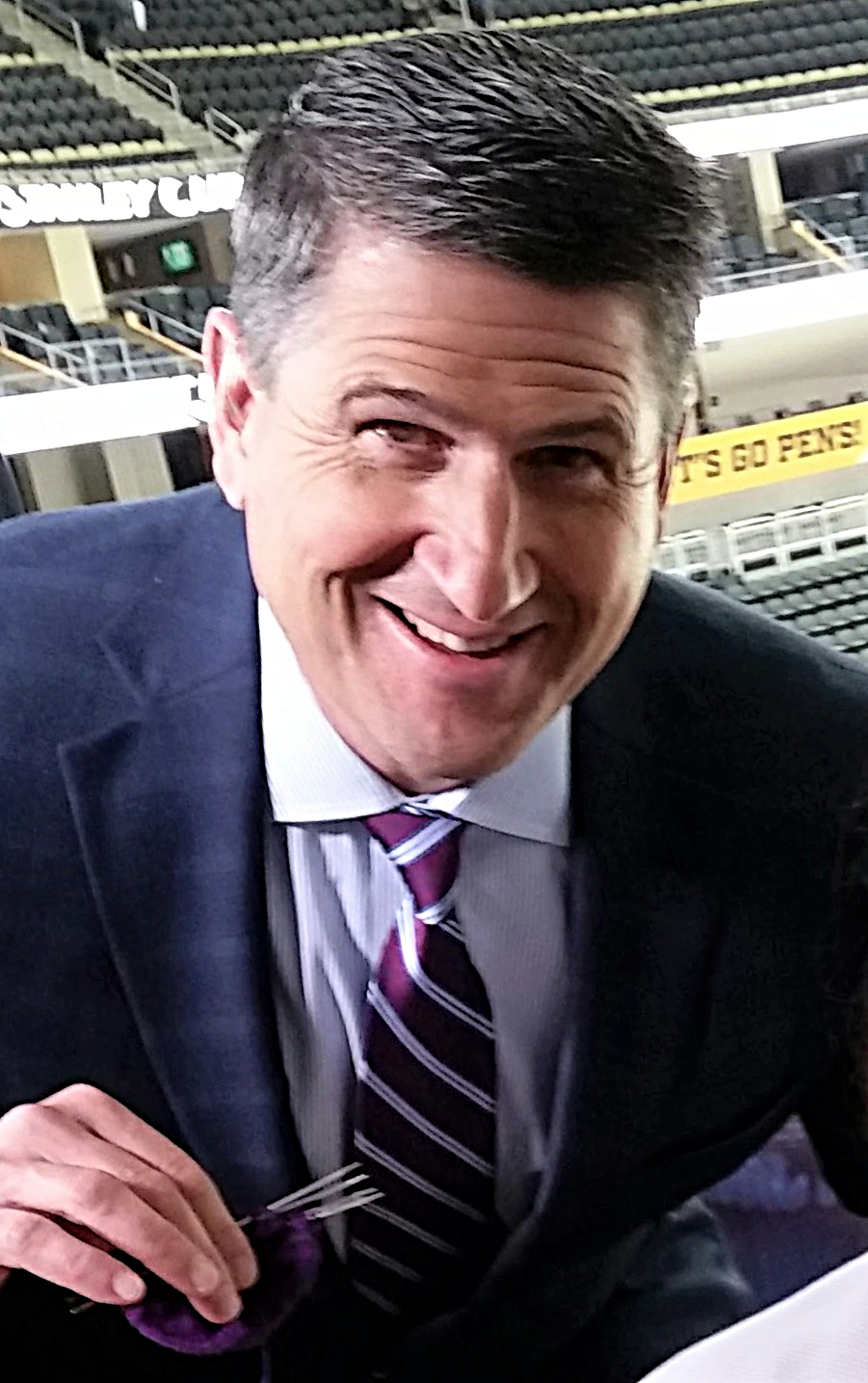
- Jones at the 2017 Stanley Cup Final
- Born: November 8, 1968 (age 57) Brantford, Ontario, Canada
- Height: 6 ft 0 in (183 cm)
- Weight: 200 lb (91 kg; 14 st 4 lb)
- Position: Right wing
- Shot: Left
- Played for: Washington Capitals; Colorado Avalanche; Philadelphia Flyers
- NHL draft: 141st overall, 1988; Washington Capitals
- Playing career: 1992–2000

Keith Jones (born November 8, 1968) is a Canadian former professional ice hockey player and current executive. He was a hockey studio analyst for NBC/NBCSN from 2005–2021 and TNT from 2021–2023. He currently works as the president of hockey operations for the Philadelphia Flyers. In 491 NHL games, Jones produced a total of 258 points between 1992 and 2000.

== Minor Hockey ==
Keith grew up in Brantford - the hometown of NHL legend Wayne Gretzky. He played minor hockey for the Paris Wolfpack of the OMHA until Midget before two seasons playing Jr.C. for the Paris Mounties (OHA) at age 17 and 18.

It is believed that Jones is the only player to play Jr.C. level hockey in Ontario at age 18 and eventually crack the National Hockey League. Two others, Hunter Drew (Anaheim) and Ryan Jones (no relation - Edmonton) played Jr.C. at 17 and eventually cracked the NHL. Jones played Midget at 16, Jr.C. at 17 and 18 and then Jr.B. at age 19.

At age 19 he moved up to the Niagara Falls Canucks of the Golden Horseshoe Jr.B. hockey league. It was in Niagara Falls that he secured a hockey scholarship to Western Michigan in 1988.

== Playing career ==
Jones was drafted in the seventh round, 141st overall, of the 1988 NHL entry draft by the Washington Capitals. He played his college hockey at Western Michigan University, and professionally for the Capitals, Colorado Avalanche and Philadelphia Flyers. He played in 491 NHL games, scoring 117 goals and assisting on 141 others for a total of 258 points.

While playing with the Flyers, Jones is credited with likely saving Eric Lindros' life by insisting the team send him to the hospital following an injury that caused Lindros to lose three liters of blood overnight.

== Sportscasting career ==
Beginning with the 2005–06 season, Jones has worked as an in-studio TV analyst alongside host Bill Clement and analyst Brian Engblom for the NHL on NBC (formerly the NHL on Versus) later host Liam McHugh, Mike Milbury, and Patrick Sharp. In addition to his duties at NBC/NBCSN, Jones also worked for NBC Sports Philadelphia as a color commentator and analyst for the Flyers.

In fall 2021, Jones joined TNT/TBS as the lead ice-level analyst joining the lead broadcast team of Kenny Albert and Eddie Olczyk.

From 2002 until 2023, Jones was a co-host for the show on 94.1 WIP Morning Show. When the show's longtime host, Angelo Cataldi retired, Jones also retired citing a hectic schedule calling hockey games. He made appearances on TSN as an NHL analyst. In 2007, Jones, along with ESPN SportsCenter anchorman John Buccigross, wrote his autobiography Jonesy: Put Your Head Down and Skate. Along with a foreword by Ray Bourque, the book recounts many of the stories that Jones witnessed throughout his career.

== Management career ==
On May 11, 2023, Jones was named the president of hockey operations for the Philadelphia Flyers after the 2023 Stanley Cup Final on TNT.

== Thoroughbred racing ==
Keith Jones was one of the partners that owned Wild Desert, winner of the 2005 Queen's Plate. Canada's most prestigious Thoroughbred horserace and the oldest continuously run event in North America, the Queen's Plate is the first leg of the Canadian Triple Crown series. Wild Desert's other owners were baseball manager Joe Torre and the late entrepreneur and gambler Dan Borislow, whose most successful horse was called 'Toccet', whose name was a misspelled tribute to former NHL player Rick Tocchet. Tocchet is currently the head coach for the Flyers and a co-worker of Jones.

Jones is a resident of Shamong Township, New Jersey.

== Career statistics ==
			Regular season					Playoffs
Season	Team	League	GP	G	A	Pts	PIM	GP	G	A	Pts	PIM
1985–86	Paris Mounties	NDJCHL	30	26	13	39	61	—	—	—	—	—
1986–87	Paris Mounties	NDJCHL	30	39	38	77	136	—	—	—	—	—
1987–88	Niagara Falls Canucks	GHL	40	50	80	130	113	—	—	—	—	—
1988–89	Western Michigan University	CCHA	37	9	12	21	65	—	—	—	—	—
1989–90	Western Michigan University	CCHA	40	19	18	37	82	—	—	—	—	—
1990–91	Western Michigan University	CCHA	41	30	19	49	106	—	—	—	—	—
1991–92	Western Michigan University	CCHA	35	25	31	56	77	—	—	—	—	—
1991–92	Baltimore Skipjacks	AHL	6	2	4	6	0	—	—	—	—	—
1992–93	Baltimore Skipjacks	AHL	8	7	3	10	4	—	—	—	—	—
1992–93	Washington Capitals	NHL	71	12	14	26	124	6	0	0	0	10
1993–94	Portland Pirates	AHL	6	5	7	12	4	—	—	—	—	—
1993–94	Washington Capitals	NHL	68	16	19	35	149	11	0	1	1	36
1994–95	Washington Capitals	NHL	40	14	6	20	65	7	4	4	8	22
1995–96	Washington Capitals	NHL	68	18	23	41	103	2	0	0	0	7
1996–97	Washington Capitals	NHL	11	2	3	5	13	—	—	—	—	—
1996–97	Colorado Avalanche	NHL	67	23	20	43	105	6	3	3	6	4
1997–98	Hershey Bears	AHL	4	2	1	3	2	—	—	—	—	—
1997–98	Colorado Avalanche	NHL	23	3	7	10	22	7	0	0	0	13
1998–99	Colorado Avalanche	NHL	12	2	2	4	20	—	—	—	—	—
1998–99	Philadelphia Flyers	NHL	66	18	31	49	78	6	2	1	3	14
1999–2000	Philadelphia Flyers	NHL	57	9	16	25	82	18	3	3	6	14
2000–01	Philadelphia Flyers	NHL	8	0	0	0	4	—	—	—	—	—
NHL totals			491	117	141	258	765	63	12	12	24	120

== Awards and honours ==
Award	Year
All-CCHA First Team	1991–92

Preceded by Gary Dornhoefer	Philadelphia Flyers TV Color Commentator; 2006-Present; With: Steve Coates	Succeeded by Incumbent
