= Scott Russell (commentator) =

Canadian sports writer and sportscaster (born 1958)

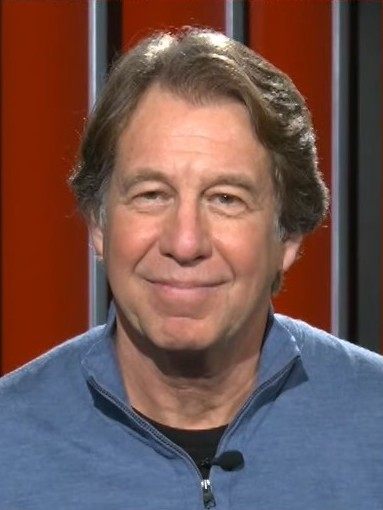
- Russell in 2021

Chancellor of Nipissing University
- Incumbent
- Assumed office July 1, 2024
- President: Kevin Wamsley
- Preceded by: Paul Cook

Personal details
- Born: Scott Alexander Russell; 1958 (age 67–68) Oshawa, Ontario, Canada
- Education: University of Western Ontario
- Occupation: Broadcaster, sports writer, author, academic administrator

Scott Alexander Russell (born 1958) is a Canadian sports writer and former sportscaster.

Russell's broadcasting career began in 1985 as a reporter for CBC Radio Charlottetown. After a year, he became a sports reporter. He moved to Montreal in 1988 and became sports reporter and anchor for four years before moving to Toronto for the CBC sports commentator position.

He has worked on numerous CBC Sports, notably covering 17 Olympics ending in 2024, including seven as host, and led the network's coverage of six Pan Am Games, six Commonwealth Games, two FIFA World Cups and a pair of Women's World Cups.

Russell was a rinkside reporter on Hockey Night in Canada from 1989 until 2003, and again from 2005 until 2024.

He is the network's top broadcaster for gymnastics and has covered them at the Olympic Games of 1996, 2000, 2004, 2008 (also serving as a fill-in primetime host for Ron MacLean, who departed early after the death of his mother from cancer), 2016, 2020 and 2024, the 1994 Commonwealth Games and the 1999 Pan American Games.

He has also worked as a studio host on coverage for each of the Winter Olympics of 1992, 1998, 2002, 2006, 2010, 2014, 2018, and 2022.

He has also periodically worked on Canadian Football League games and curling telecasts as a sideline reporter.

He hosted CBC Sports Saturday from 2003 until 2005. He also hosted CBC's coverage of the 2010 FIFA World Cup and the 2011 FIFA Women's World Cup.

Russell is from Oshawa, Ontario, and earned a Master of Arts degree from the University of Western Ontario in 1985.

In 2012 he was awarded a Queen Elizabeth II Diamond Jubilee Medal for his contributions to sports in Canada.

Russell is an honorary board member of the Paralympic Foundation of Canada, advisory board member for the International Centre for Olympic Studies at Western University and has an honorary doctorate (D.Lit.) from Nipissing University.

In June 2024, Russell announced he would be retiring from broadcasting following the 2024 Summer Paralympics, after which he began a four-year term as chancellor at his Alma mater Nipissing University in North Bay, Ontario.

== Bibliography ==
- 1997: The Rink: Stories from Hockey’s Home Towns (co-author with Chris Cuthbert, ISBN 0-670-87550-3)
- 2000: Ice Time: a Canadian Hockey Journey (ISBN 0670885207)
- 2003: Open House (Doubleday, ISBN 0-385-65922-9), on the subject of curling
