= Frank Selke Jr. =

Canadian hockey executive and broadcaster (1929–2013)

Francis Donald Selke (September 7, 1929 – March 18, 2013) was a Canadian hockey executive and broadcaster who served as an announcer and executive for Hockey Night in Canada and was president and general manager of the Oakland Seals.

== Early life ==
Selke was born on September 7, 1929, in Toronto. He was the sixth of seven children born to and Mary Agnes (Schmidt) and Frank J. Selke. The elder Selke, an electrician and manager of a minor professional hockey team, was hired by the Toronto Maple Leafs on the day Selke Jr. was born. Selke played bantam hockey in Toronto and was a member of the St. Michael's College School football team.

== Montreal Canadiens and Hockey Night in Canada ==
Selke dropped out of high school to work at the Montreal Forum, when his father became general manager of the Montreal Canadiens in 1946. Selke started as a general labourer and moved up to working on ice crew and as an electrician's helper before becoming the Forum's publicity director in 1951. From 1958-1967, he became the colour commentator, host, and interviewer on Hockey Night in Canada telecasts in Montreal while continuing his work with the team.

== Oakland Seals ==
In 1967, Selke became the president of the expansion Oakland Seals. Following Bert Olmstead's departure in 1968, Selke stepped down as president and took over as general manager. The Seals made the playoffs in Selke's first two seasons as general manager, but struggled financially. After aborted relocations to Buffalo and Vancouver, the team was purchased by Oakland Athletics owner Charlie Finley in 1970. Finley offered Selke a one-year contract at a reduced salary to stay on as GM, but Selke declined and left the team.

== Canadian Sports Network ==
Following his departure from the Seals, Selke headed marketing for the Canadian Sports Network (later known as Ohlmeyer Communications and Molstar), which produced Hockey Night in Canada. He retired from Molstar in April 1989, but continued to work in broadcasting as a consultant.

== Special Olympics ==
In 1983, Selke joined the board of directors of Special Olympics Ontario. He served as the organization's president from 1989 to 1990, and was its chairman for 11 years. In 1991, he received the Canada Volunteer Award Medal from Health and Welfare Canada for his work with the Special Olympics.

Selke died on March 18, 2013, at age 83.

Sporting positions
Preceded by Bert Olmstead	General Manager of the Oakland Seals; 1968–1970	Succeeded by Bill Torrey
