= Ward Cornell =

Canadian broadcaster (1924–2000)

Ward MacLaurin Cornell (4 May 1924 – 5 February 2000) was a Canadian broadcaster noted for hosting Hockey Night in Canada between 1959 and 1972.

== Biography ==
He was born in London, Ontario where he studied at the University of Western Ontario. There, he became a CFPL (AM) radio announcer of campus sports games. Following graduation in 1949, he presented sports news in the early years of CFPL-TV. During the next five years, he held a tutorial position, teaching English Literature, History and Geography, at Pickering College in Newmarket, Ontario while still finding the time to perform announcing duties for sports events on radio and play roles in drama performances on the CBC Radio network. Then in 1954 he became general manager at CFPL radio, holding that post for 13 years.

Following his 1972 departure from Hockey Night in Canada, Cornell became Ontario's Agent-General in London, UK from 1972 to 1978. In the 1980s, he served as the province's deputy minister for culture and recreation and then as deputy housing minister.

Cornell died aged 75 at Uxbridge, Ontario due to emphysema. He left his wife Georgina Saxon (m. 1969) and five children. He is buried in Uxbridge Cemetery.
