= Pierre Houde =

Canadian play-by-play sports announcer

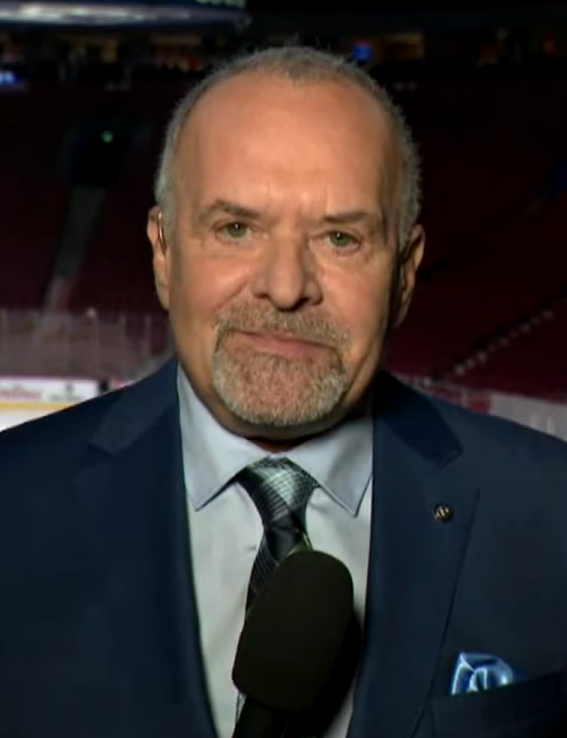
- Houde in 2024
- Born: 14 July 1957 (age 69)
- Education: HEC Montréal
- Years active: 1989–present
- Awards: Foster Hewitt Memorial Award
- Sports commentary career
- Team: Montreal Canadiens
- Genre: Play-by-play
- Sport: National Hockey League
- Employer: Réseau des sports

Pierre Houde (born 14 July 1957) is a Canadian play-by-play sports announcer for Réseau des sports (RDS). He has announced broadcasts of Montreal Canadiens games since 1989, and received the Foster Hewitt Memorial Award in 2024, in recognition from the Hockey Hall of Fame for his broadcasting career.

== Early life ==
Houde started his broadcasting career at CKOI-FM as a weekend DJ when he was 20 years old and still going to HEC Montréal. His first sports broadcasting was doing half-time NFL broadcasts in French as a freelancer. Houde was one of the original staff at RDS when it started in September 1989.

== Hockey broadcast career ==
Houde has announced broadcasts of Montreal Canadiens games since 1989. Over the years he was partnered with Pierre Bouchard and Yvon Pedneault. From 2007 to 2011, his partner was former Canadiens' player Benoît Brunet. In 2009, Joël Bouchard was his and Brunet's partners, but when Bouchard left for the Blainville-Boisbriand Armada in 2011, he was replaced by former NHL goaltender Marc Denis. Houde also broadcasts Formula One Races at the same station along with Bertrand Houle.

Houde's goal call is "Le tir, et le but!" ("The shot, and the goal!") after every Canadiens goal, though depending on the moment he stretches "but" out for as long as ten seconds. Other calls are "Eh bien, coup de théâtre, ma parole!" which he often uses when unbelievable situations occur and "Les rouges s'éteignent... et on roule!!" at the start of a Formula One Grand Prix.

Houde does hockey play by plays on Le Hockey Du Samedi Soir, Le Hockey Du Mardi Soir, Le Hockey Du Jeudi Soir and any other days the Canadiens play.

Houde is fluently bilingual in both English and French. However, he has only called two games in English. When Dino Sisto, the English play-by-play announcer for the Canadiens on CJAD, was unable to get back to Montreal from a party to celebrate the station's 50th anniversary, he asked Houde to step in and to call CJAD's broadcast of the Canadiens' game against the Detroit Red Wings on December 2, 1995. Houde reluctantly agreed, as no other experienced anglophone broadcaster was available. The Canadiens lost that game in an 11–1 rout that proved to be Patrick Roy's last game with the team before being traded to the Colorado Avalanche. The second came when he called a Canadiens game against the Pittsburgh Penguins on RDS' anglophone sister, The Sports Network. Houde had previously been considered for the play-by-play spot with the Avalanche.

== Honours and reputation ==
Houde has acquired a fairly large following among the Canadiens' anglophone fans, many of whom watch his telecasts rather than those on Hockey Night in Canada. According to a 2020 poll by The Athletic, 44.5 percent of Canadiens fans watch Houde's broadcasts, a figure that The Athletic attributed to large Anglophone viewership.

Houde received the Foster Hewitt Memorial Award in 2024, in recognition from the Hockey Hall of Fame for his broadcasting career.

== Personal life ==
Houde is from Saint-Laurent, Quebec, now a borough in the city of Montreal. He has shared his life with Lyne Couture since summer 2018.
