= Claude Quenneville =

Canadian sports commentator in Quebec

Claude Quenneville is a Canadian sports commentator in Quebec. He served as the French-language radio voice of the Montreal Canadiens of the National Hockey League. He began his career at the age of 14 at radio station CJMT-AM in Chicoutimi and was later hired by the CBC as an announcer in 1971. In 1973–74, he hosted a weekly variety show, called Tempo.

He became well known by becoming the announcer for radio broadcasts for games played by the Montreal Canadiens from 1982 to 1990. He also hosted the popular show La Soirée du hockey on SRC, and been a long-time commentator on Olympic events; including weightlifting events at the 1976 Olympics in Montreal, diving events at the 1984 Olympics in Los Angeles and at the 1988 Olympics in Seoul, athletics in Atlanta at the 1996 Olympics, in Sydney at the 2000 Olympics, in Athens at the 2004 Olympics and in Beijing at the 2008 Olympics. At the winter games he had been commentator of the ice hockey events in Nagano at the 1998 Winter Olympics, in Salt Lake City at the 2002 Olympics and in Turin at the 2006 Olympics. Quenneville has also covered the Commonwealth Games of Edmonton (1978), of Edinburgh (1986) and Victoria (1994).

His work as sports commentator has earned him two Gémeaux Awards – the first in 1991 for the best sports commentator and the second in 1994 with Gilles Tremblay for La Soirée du Hockey.
