= Emily Kaplan =

American journalist (born 1991)

- Born: May 6, 1991 (age 35)
- Education: Penn State University
- Occupation: Sports reporter
- Years active: 2009-present

Emily Kaplan (born May 7, 1991) is an American sports reporter who works for ESPN, covering the National Hockey League, including rinkside coverage for the Stanley Cup playoffs. She was a panelist on Around the Horn. She joined the network in 2017 after beginning her career at Sports Illustrated, where she covered the National Football League.

Kaplan grew up in Montclair, New Jersey. She attended Penn State University from 2009–2013, where she wrote for the student newspaper, The Daily Collegian. She also worked for several professional outlets, including the Associated Press, and Philadelphia Inquirer, during the Jerry Sandusky sex abuse scandal, all while she was still a student. After graduation, Kaplan had an internship with the Boston Globe, then got a job as a fact checker/reporter at Sports Illustrated. She became a Sports Illustrated staff writer at age 24, earning several magazine bylines before joining ESPN to cover hockey.

Kaplan is known for ending interviews with "thank you" in the players' native language, in what she has considered her efforts to be respectful of their cultures.
