= Eddie Olczyk =

American ice hockey player and coach

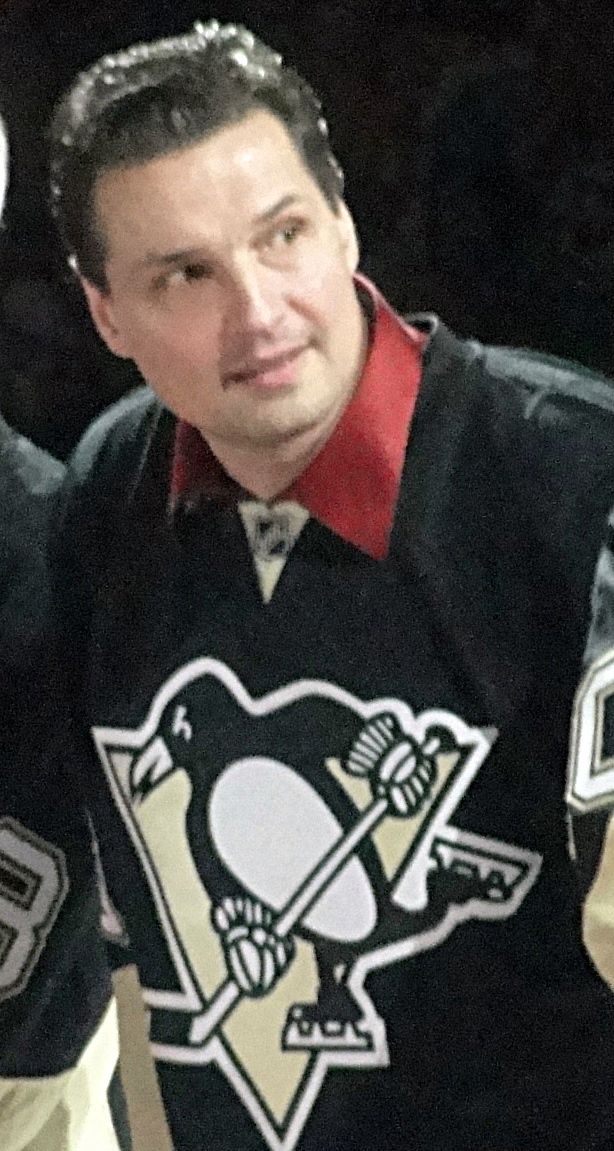
- Olczyk in 2010
- Born: August 16, 1966 (age 60) Chicago, Illinois, U.S.
- Height: 6 ft 1 in (185 cm)
- Weight: 200 lb (91 kg; 14 st 4 lb)
- Position: Center
- Shot: Left
- Played for: Chicago Blackhawks; Toronto Maple Leafs; Winnipeg Jets; New York Rangers; Los Angeles Kings; Pittsburgh Penguins
- National team: United States
- NHL draft: 3rd overall, 1984; Chicago Black Hawks
- Playing career: 1984–2000

Edward Walter Olczyk Jr. (/ˈoʊltʃɪk/; born August 16, 1966) is an American sportscaster and former professional ice hockey player and coach. He spent 16 seasons in the National Hockey League (NHL), playing as a center for the Chicago Blackhawks, Toronto Maple Leafs, Winnipeg Jets, New York Rangers, Los Angeles Kings, and Pittsburgh Penguins. He won the Stanley Cup with the Rangers in 1994. Olczyk was also the head coach of the Penguins from June 2003 to December 2005.

Olczyk moved into broadcasting in his post-playing career, and currently provides commentary for NHL on TNT. He served as a television color commentator for Seattle Kraken games on the Kraken Hockey Network (KHN) from August 2022 to July 2026, as well as NHL on NBC until its end in 2021, and maintains a relationship with NBC Sports as a handicapper and analyst for that network's horse racing coverage.

Throughout his career as an NHL player, he played 1,031 NHL games and produced 342 goals and 452 assists for a total of 794 points. He was inducted into the United States Hockey Hall of Fame on February 22, 2013. During the 1989–90 season Olczyk scored a point in 18 consecutive games, which was the longest streak by an American-born player in NHL history. The record was tied by Phil Kessel and later broken by Patrick Kane.

== Playing career ==
=== Amateur career ===
As a youth, Olczyk played in the 1978 and 1979 Quebec International Pee-Wee Hockey Tournaments with a minor ice hockey team from Chicago.

Olczyk grew up in Niles, Illinois and Palos Heights, Illinois and went to Brother Rice Catholic High School. He was a star on the Illinois midget AAA team (Team Illinois) that won the 1982 national title against a Detroit Compuware squad that featured future NHL stars Pat LaFontaine and Al Iafrate. He then moved to Canada to play for the Stratford Cullitons junior team before joining the 1984 U.S. Olympic hockey team.

=== Professional career ===
Olczyk was selected by the Chicago Blackhawks as the third overall pick in the first round of the 1984 NHL entry draft. He scored his first NHL goal in his first NHL game on October 11, 1984, versus the Detroit Red Wings in Chicago Stadium against Greg Stefan. From 1984 through 1987, Olczyk was a member of Chicago's infamous "Clydesdale Line" with Troy Murray and Curt Fraser, the nickname coined by Chicago's broadcaster Pat Foley, as each player weighed in at or around 200 pounds. He was traded several times during his career. In 1987, Olczyk was traded to the Toronto Maple Leafs with Al Secord for Rick Vaive, Steve Thomas, and Bob McGill.

In the 1989–90 season, Olczyk recorded an 18-game point streak, setting the record for longest point streak by an American player (later tied by Phil Kessel), the record would stand until being passed by Patrick Kane in the 2015–16 season. The 18-game streak would remain a Toronto franchise record (tied with Darryl Sittler) until being surpassed in December 2022 by Mitch Marner.

He was traded again in 1990 to the Winnipeg Jets, with Mark Osborne for Dave Ellett and Paul Fenton.

In 1992, he was traded for the third time in his career, this time to the New York Rangers for Kris King and Tie Domi. Olczyk missed much of the 1993–94 season recovering from a thumb injury suffered in a game versus the Florida Panthers on January 3, 1994; he took part in one playoff game (conference final game six) and on June 14, 1994, became Stanley Cup champion with the Rangers.

During the next season, he was traded back to the Winnipeg Jets for their fifth-round choice (who ended up being Alexei Vasiliev) in the 1995 NHL entry draft. After signing as a free agent with the Los Angeles Kings in 1996, he did not finish the season with them before being traded to the Pittsburgh Penguins for Glen Murray. He finished his career in Chicago.

== Post-playing career ==
He returned to Pittsburgh to become the color commentator for the Penguins on FSN Pittsburgh, where he was given the nickname "Edzo" by co-announcer Mike Lange. In 2003, he moved from the booth to the bench and served as head coach of the Pittsburgh Penguins from June 11, 2003, until December 15, 2005. Despite adding marquee free-agents, the Penguins started the season with a disappointing 8–17–6 record, leading to Olczyk's dismissal on December 15. However, Olczyk has stated in press reports that he felt that his attempts to protect a young Sidney Crosby and other rookies on the Penguins from team hazing also contributed to his dismissal as coach.

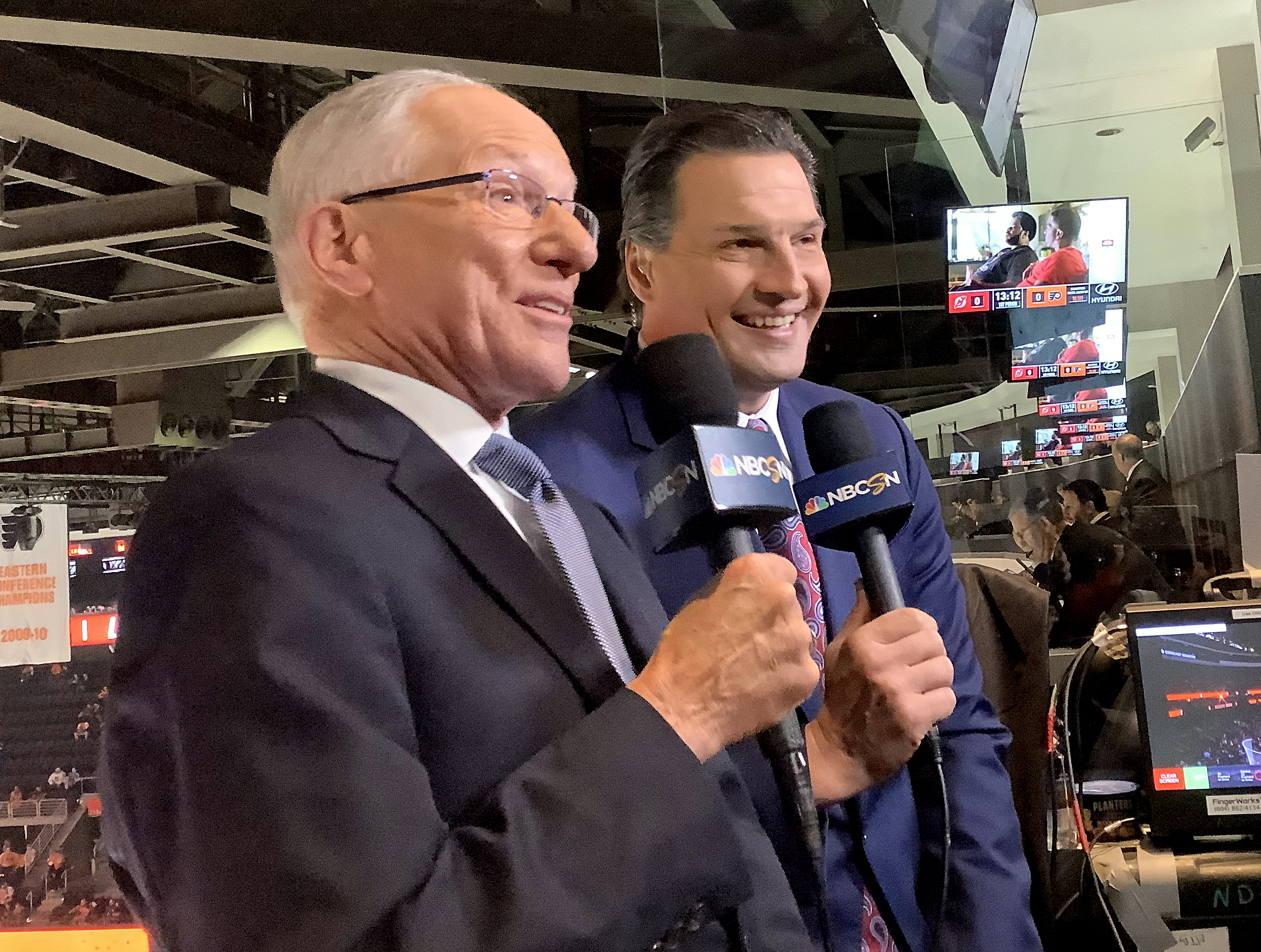
Mike Emrick and Eddie Olczyk working a game on NHL on NBCSN (2019)

Beginning with the 2006–07 NHL season, Olczyk was the color commentator for the Chicago Blackhawks television broadcasts, partnering play-by-play announcer Pat Foley. He also was the lead color commentator for NHL on NBC, and previously for the NHL on Versus; the latter later rebranded as NBCSN in 2012, for both the 2010 Vancouver Winter Olympics Men's Ice Hockey and 2014 Sochi Winter Olympics, where he partnered with Mike Emrick and "Inside-the-Glass" reporter Pierre McGuire.

At the end of the 5–3 U.S. win over Canada at the 2010 Vancouver Winter Olympics, Olczyk described the game as being "tremendously tremendous" after U.S. forward Ryan Kesler scored an empty-netter. The audio of Olczyk saying "This has been tremendously tremendous" was an instant hit among hockey enthusiasts and was the subject of many spoofs online.

In February 2016, it was announced that Olczyk would be the recipient of the Ring Lardner Award, which was founded in 2002 by the Chicago Athletic Association and honors broadcasters and writers who "exemplify the wit and warmth of Ring Lardner's writing." On July 11, 2012, Olczyk became the 16th Blackhawks player elected into the United States Hockey Hall of Fame. The Blackhawks honored "Edzo" for his induction in a pregame ceremony on February 22, 2013, at the United Center.

In 2009, Olczyk received an Emmy for "Outstanding Achievement for Individual Excellence On Camera: Programming," followed by a 2012 Emmy for "Outstanding Achievement for Sports Programs - Sporting Event/Game - Live/Unedited Program/Special." He was also inducted into the National Italian American Sports Hall of Fame in 2013.

On April 8, 2010, Olczyk returned to Pittsburgh to join more than 50 former Pittsburgh Penguins players being honored in a pregame ceremony before the final regular season game at Civic Arena in Pittsburgh.

On December 30, 2010, it was announced that Foley and Olczyk signed a three-year extension to stay with the Blackhawks.

On May 5, 2014, EA Sports announced that "Eddie O" would provide color commentary for NHL 15 alongside play-by-play announcer Mike Emrick and "Inside-the-Glass" reporter Ray Ferraro. The trio have provided commentary for five years until Ferraro became the new color commentator in NHL 20. From 2018 to 2020, "Inside-the-Glass" reporter Brian Boucher joined the lead duo for national games. After Emrick retired, at the end of the 2020 Stanley Cup Final, on October 19, 2020, he was paired with Kenny Albert and John Forslund for most of the regular season but was paired with Albert for the playoffs and the Stanley Cup Final.

Albert and Olczyk joined TNT after the Finals as their lead broadcast team while NBC studio analyst Keith Jones was later added to join the pair.

Olczyk also has an interest in Thoroughbred horse racing, appearing in advertisements for Xpressbet and serving as a guest commentator and handicapper for major horse racing events such as the Kentucky Derby, Kentucky Oaks, Preakness Stakes, and the Belmont Stakes on NBC networks, and on WGN Sports coverage of the Arlington Million that is fed nationally. Olczyk's deal with TNT allows him to remain at NBC for horse racing.

On July 18, 2022, Olczyk left the Blackhawks following a contract dispute to join the broadcasting team for the Seattle Kraken. On July 28, 2026, Olczyk left the Kraken broadcasting team due to personal reasons, deciding to focus on national broadcasts with NHL on TNT.

== Personal life ==
Olczyk and his wife, Diana, have three sons, all former hockey players, and one daughter. Nick played for the Colorado College Tigers and, in 2022, became a television studio analyst for the Seattle Kraken. Tom, who played hockey at Penn State, most recently played professionally for the Indy Fuel of the ECHL and the Rockford IceHogs of the AHL. Eddie III spent a season with the Bloomington Thunder of the SPHL, has been an assistant coach with the Bemidji State Beavers, and is an amateur scout for the Kraken. Olczyk's daughter Zandra attended the University of Alabama.

Rick Olczyk, Eddie's younger brother, is a former hockey player for Brown University and became an assistant general manager for the Kraken in 2019.

On August 8, 2017, Olczyk issued a statement through the Blackhawks to announce that he had been diagnosed with stage 3 colon cancer, having undergone a surgical procedure to remove the tumor. Due to his chemo treatments, he only called select games that season for the team and NHL on NBC. In March 2018, Olczyk announced that he was officially "cancer-free."

In October 2019, Olczyk released his autobiography, Eddie Olczyk: Beating the Odds in Hockey and in Life, in which he shares details of his fight with stage 3 colon cancer.

== Career statistics ==
=== Regular season and playoffs ===
			Regular season					Playoffs
Season	Team	League	GP	G	A	Pts	PIM	GP	G	A	Pts	PIM
1982–83	Stratford Cullitons	MWJHL	42	50	92	142	54	—	—	—	—	—
1983–84	United States	Intl	62	21	47	68	36	—	—	—	—	—
1984–85	Chicago Black Hawks	NHL	70	20	30	50	67	15	6	5	11	11
1985–86	Chicago Black Hawks	NHL	79	29	50	79	47	3	0	0	0	0
1986–87	Chicago Blackhawks	NHL	79	16	35	51	119	4	1	1	2	4
1987–88	Toronto Maple Leafs	NHL	80	42	33	75	55	6	5	4	9	2
1988–89	Toronto Maple Leafs	NHL	80	38	52	90	75	—	—	—	—	—
1989–90	Toronto Maple Leafs	NHL	79	32	56	88	78	5	1	2	3	14
1990–91	Toronto Maple Leafs	NHL	18	4	10	14	13	—	—	—	—	—
1990–91	Winnipeg Jets	NHL	61	26	31	57	69	—	—	—	—	—
1991–92	Winnipeg Jets	NHL	64	32	33	65	67	6	2	1	3	4
1992–93	Winnipeg Jets	NHL	25	8	12	20	26	—	—	—	—	—
1992–93	New York Rangers	NHL	46	13	16	29	26	—	—	—	—	—
1993–94	New York Rangers	NHL	37	3	5	8	28	1	0	0	0	0
1994–95	New York Rangers	NHL	20	2	1	3	4	—	—	—	—	—
1994–95	Winnipeg Jets	NHL	13	2	8	10	8	—	—	—	—	—
1995–96	Winnipeg Jets	NHL	51	27	22	49	65	6	1	2	3	6
1996–97	Los Angeles Kings	NHL	67	21	23	44	45	—	—	—	—	—
1996–97	Pittsburgh Penguins	NHL	12	4	7	11	6	5	1	0	1	12
1997–98	Pittsburgh Penguins	NHL	56	11	11	22	35	6	2	0	2	4
1998–99	Chicago Wolves	IHL	7	2	2	4	6	—	—	—	—	—
1998–99	Chicago Blackhawks	NHL	61	10	15	25	29	—	—	—	—	—
1999–2000	Chicago Blackhawks	NHL	33	2	2	4	12	—	—	—	—	—
NHL totals			1,031	342	452	794	874	57	19	15	34	57

=== International ===
Year	Team	Event	GP	G	A	Pts	PIM
1984	United States	OG	6	2	5	7	0
1984	United States	CC	6	1	6	7	6
1985	United States	WC	6	1	6	7	6
1986	United States	WC	7	4	6	10	12
1987	United States	WC	10	4	3	7	10
1987	United States	CC	5	1	1	2	2
1989	United States	WC	10	4	3	7	10
1991	United States	CC	8	0	3	3	4
1993	United States	WC	6	1	1	2	18
Senior totals			64	18	34	52	68

== Awards and achievements ==
- Stanley Cup champion – 1994 (New York Rangers)
- United States Hockey Hall of Fame 2012
- National Polish-American Sports Hall of Fame 2004

=== National team ===
- 1984 Winter Olympics (seventh place)
- 1984 Canada Cup (fourth place)
- 1987 Canada Cup (fifth place)
- 1991 Canada Cup (second place)
- Ice Hockey World Championships: 1985 (fourth place), 1986 (sixth place), 1987 (seventh place), 1989 (sixth place), 1993 (sixth place)

== Coaching record ==
Team	Year	Regular season							Postseason			
Team	Year	G	W	L	T	OTL	Pts	Finish	W	L	Win%	Result
PIT	2003–04	82	23	47	8	4	58	5th in Atlantic	—	—	—	Missed playoffs
PIT	2004–05	—	—	—	—	—	—	—	—	—	—	Season not played due to NHL lockout
PIT	2005–06	31	8	17	—	6	24	(fired)	—	—	—	—
Total		113	31	64	8	10	82		—	—	—	—

== See also ==
- List of NHL players with 1,000 games played

Preceded by Bruce Cassidy	Chicago Black Hawks first-round draft pick 1984	Succeeded by Dave Manson
Preceded by Rick Kehoe	Head coach of the Pittsburgh Penguins; 2003–2005	Succeeded by Michel Therrien
