= Steve Levy =

American journalist and sportscaster

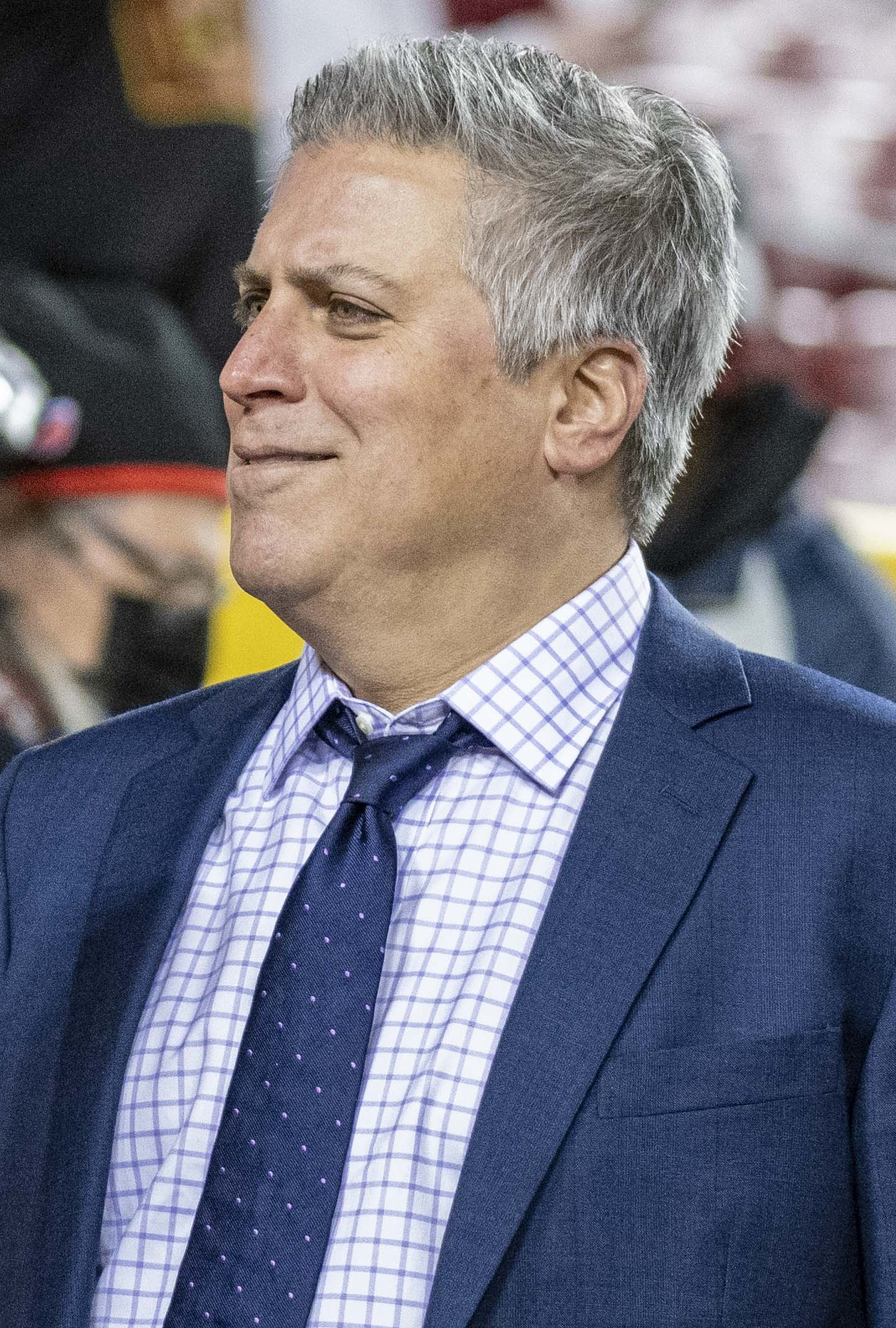
- Levy in 2021
- Born: March 12, 1965 (age 61)
- Education: State University of New York at Oswego
- Occupation: Sportscaster
- Years active: 1993–present
- Notable credit(s): SportsCenter; MLB Baseball, NFL football, College football
- Spouse: Ani Levy (m. 2010, divorced)

Steve Levy (/ˈliːviː/; born March 12, 1965) is an American journalist and sportscaster for ESPN. He is known for his work broadcasting college football, Monday Night Football and the National Hockey League.

== Early life ==
Levy went to John F. Kennedy High School in Bellmore, New York, and then graduated in 1987 from the State University of New York at Oswego with a degree in communications and broadcasting. He is Jewish.

== Career ==
Before working for ESPN, Levy in radio and television for WFAN, MSG Network, WCBS-TV, WABC-AM, and WNBC-AM in New York City.

=== ESPN ===
Levy has been with ESPN since August 1, 1993. At ESPN, he usually works on SportsCenter, and has hosted the late night edition on Monday night during the NFL season, following Monday Night Football. He covered NHL regular season and playoff games before the network lost the rights to televise the league's games. He also previously covered the network's college football coverage for four seasons, 1999–2002, returning to this role in 2016. He also served as a fill-in play-by-play commentator for Wednesday Night Baseball. He served as ESPN's lead play-by-play announcer for the XFL in 2020.

==== National Hockey League ====
Levy is a prolific and well-known NHL broadcaster. He has earned the nickname "Mr. Extra Period" for having called three of the longest televised games in NHL history, all of which have been playoff games, two of which he teamed up with Darren Pang: a 1996 game between the Pittsburgh Penguins and the Washington Capitals that went four overtimes; a 2000 contest that also featured the Penguins, this time playing the Philadelphia Flyers, which went five overtimes; and a 2003 matchup between the Mighty Ducks of Anaheim and the Dallas Stars, which also went five overtimes, and lasted six hours. The only two games to go longer took place before the era of television.

==== Monday Night Football ====
In 2019, Levy called one of ESPN's Monday Night Football matchups in week 1 alongside his broadcast partners Brian Griese and Louis Riddick. The following year, the trio were named to the lead Monday Night Football crew, which lasted until the hiring of Joe Buck and Troy Aikman in 2022. Levy was paired with Riddick and Dan Orlovsky as MNF's second announcing crew when the NFL announced two MNF games beginning in 2022, before being replaced by Chris Fowler the next year.

==== Other work ====
Levy had cameo in the interactive video for the Bob Dylan classic "Like A Rolling Stone".

Levy, Pang, and Barry Melrose called the 2016 World Cup of Hockey on ESPN. Levy performed as a play-by-play commentator for the Puppy Bowl in 2021.

| Preceded by Joe Tessitore | Monday Night Football play-by-play announcer 2020-2021 | Succeeded by Joe Buck |
