= Yvon Pedneault =

Canadian sports journalist (1946–2023)

Yvon Pedneault (6 August 1946 – 26 August 2023) was a Canadian sports journalist and television and radio broadcaster from Chicoutimi, Quebec, who is known for his coverage of ice hockey. Pedneault is the only person to have worked full-time for all three French-language Montreal daily papers, as well as every French-language television station that has carried Montreal Canadiens games. In 1998, he was awarded the Elmer Ferguson Memorial Award, an award given annually by the Hockey Hall of Fame to distinguished members of the newspaper profession.

== Career ==
=== Early life and career ===
Yvon Pedneault joined the local newspaper in Chicoutimi in 1965 as the bowling writer. A year later, Pedneault was the sports editor for Progrès-Dimanche. In 1965, Pedneault moved to Montreal where he was hired by Jacques Beauchamp to be a hockey writer for the Montréal-Matin. With the Montréal-Matin, he covered the Montreal Canadiens and the Junior Canadiens, as well as the local horse racing scene. His work would also be published in two other daily newspapers during his career: La Presse, where he covered the Canadiens, and Le Journal de Montréal, where he was a hockey reporter and later served as their sports editor.

=== Notoriety ===
During his career, Pedneault would also cover the Canadiens on four different television stations in Montreal: Réseau des sports, Télévision de Radio-Canada, TVA and TQS. Because of this, Pedneault is the only person that has worked full-time for all three French-language Montreal daily papers, as well as every French-language television station that has carried Montreal Canadiens games.

Pedneault was host of one of North America's longest-running sports talk, radio call-in shows, called "Les amateurs de sports" in the '70s on CKAC in Montreal (the program airs to this day).

Pedneault would also cover several Olympic Games.

Pedneault also briefly served as the General Manager of Le Collège Français de Longueuil in the Quebec Major Junior Hockey League.

In 1998, he was awarded the Elmer Ferguson Memorial Award, an award given annually by the Hockey Hall of Fame to distinguished members of the newspaper profession.

Pedneault was a member of the Hockey Hall of Fame selection committee from June 2005 to June 2011.

Pedneault's highest profile work has been as colour commentator for Le Réseau des sports, TSN's French equivalent for ten years. Prior to the beginning of the 2008–09 hockey season, RDS decided not to renew his contract due to salary demands and replaced him with former Canadiens player Benoît Brunet, who previously provided intermission commentary.

Pedneault provided commentary segments on some of the CBC Hockey Night in Canada Canadiens broadcasts despite his less than perfect English. He also appeared regularly as a panelist on the French language sports show 110% on TQS.

Pedneault was also well-known due to his popular catchphrase "C'est l'heure!" (It's time!) followed by a drill-like sound.

Pedneault worked for the TVA Sports network from 2009.

== Death ==
Yvon Pedneault died of cancer on 26 August 2023, at the age of 77. He was diagnosed only one month previously.
