= Benoît Brunet =

Canadian ice hockey player (born 1968)

- Born: August 24, 1968 (age 57) Sainte-Anne-de-Bellevue, Quebec, Canada
- Height: 5 ft 11 in (180 cm)
- Weight: 184 lb (83 kg; 13 st 2 lb)
- Position: Left wing
- Shot: Left
- Played for: Montreal Canadiens; Dallas Stars; Ottawa Senators
- NHL draft: 27th overall, 1986; Montreal Canadiens
- Playing career: 1988–2002

Joseph Jean Luc Benoît Brunet (French pronunciation: [ʒozɛf ʒɑ̃ lyk bənwa bʁynɛ]; born August 24, 1968) is a Canadian former professional ice hockey player. He was drafted by the Montreal Canadiens in the second round, 27th overall, of the 1986 NHL entry draft. Brunet has also played for the Dallas Stars and Ottawa Senators.

== Playing career ==
After playing three seasons for the Hull Olympiques of the QMJHL, Brunet made his professional debut with the American Hockey League's Sherbrooke Canadiens in the 1988–89 season. He also made his NHL debut with Montreal that same season, appearing in two games and recording one assist.

Brunet became a fixture on the Canadiens' roster, playing with them until the 2001–02 season. He became a favorite of the hometown fans due to his local roots and path to the NHL as well as his work as a defensive forward which made him a constant on the team's penalty killing unit. During the 2001–02 season, he was traded to the Dallas Stars, along with Martin Ručinský, in exchange for Donald Audette and Shaun Van Allen. Brunet appeared in 32 games with the Stars before being traded again, this time to the Ottawa Senators in exchange for a pick in the 2003 NHL entry draft. Brunet finished the season with Ottawa, and retired afterward.

In his NHL career, Brunet appeared in 539 games. He scored 101 goals and added 161 assists. He also appeared in 54 playoff games, scoring five goals and adding 20 assists. He was a member of the Canadiens team that won the Stanley Cup in 1993.

== Colour commentator ==
A few years after his retirement, Brunet was hired as a colour commentator for the French-language sports network RDS for NHL games that did not involve the Montreal Canadiens. For the 2008-09 season he was promoted as the main colour commentator alongside play-by-play man Pierre Houde for all Montreal Canadiens games, replacing longtime veteran Yvon Pedneault.

== Career statistics ==
			Regular season					Playoffs
Season	Team	League	GP	G	A	Pts	PIM	GP	G	A	Pts	PIM
1984–85	Lac St-Louis Lions	QMAAA	4	2	5	7	6	7	1	2	3
1985–86	Hull Olympiques	QMJHL	71	33	37	70	81	15	5	14	19	33
1986–87	Hull Olympiques	QMJHL	60	43	67	110	105	6	7	5	12	8
1987–88	Hull Olympiques	QMJHL	62	54	89	143	131	10	3	10	13	11
1988–89	Sherbrooke Canadiens	AHL	73	41	76	117	95	6	2	0	2	4
1988–89	Montreal Canadiens	NHL	2	0	1	1	0	—	—	—	—	—
1989–90	Sherbrooke Canadiens	AHL	72	32	35	67	82	12	8	7	15	20
1990–91	Fredericton Canadiens	AHL	24	13	18	31	16	6	5	6	11	2
1990–91	Montreal Canadiens	NHL	17	1	3	4	0	—	—	—	—	—
1991–92	Fredericton Canadiens	AHL	6	7	9	16	27	—	—	—	—	—
1991–92	Montreal Canadiens	NHL	18	4	6	10	14	—	—	—	—	—
1992–93	Montreal Canadiens	NHL	47	10	15	25	19	20	2	8	10	8
1993–94	Montreal Canadiens	NHL	71	10	20	30	20	7	1	4	5	16
1994–95	Montreal Canadiens	NHL	45	7	18	25	16	—	—	—	—	—
1995–96	Fredericton Canadiens	AHL	3	2	1	3	6	—	—	—	—	—
1995–96	Montreal Canadiens	NHL	26	7	8	15	17	3	0	2	2	0
1996–97	Montreal Canadiens	NHL	39	10	13	23	14	4	1	3	4	4
1997–98	Montreal Canadiens	NHL	68	12	20	32	61	8	1	0	1	4
1998–99	Montreal Canadiens	NHL	60	14	17	31	31	—	—	—	—	—
1999–2000	Montreal Canadiens	NHL	50	14	15	29	13	—	—	—	—	—
2000–01	Montreal Canadiens	NHL	35	3	11	14	12	—	—	—	—	—
2001–02	Montreal Canadiens	NHL	16	0	2	2	4	—	—	—	—	—
2001–02	Dallas Stars	NHL	32	4	9	13	8	—	—	—	—	—
2001–02	Utah Grizzlies	AHL	5	3	1	4	6	—	—	—	—	—
2001–02	Ottawa Senators	NHL	13	5	3	8	0	12	0	3	3	0
AHL totals			183	98	140	238	232	24	15	13	28	26
NHL totals			539	101	161	262	229	54	5	20	25	32
