= 1991 Canada Cup rosters =

Below is the list of national team rosters for the 1991 Canada Cup ice hockey tournament.

== Canada ==
Head coach: Mike Keenan

Assistant coach: Pat Burns, Mike Pelino, Brian Sutter, Tom Watt, Tom Webster

No.	Pos.	Name	Height	Weight	Birthdate	1991-92 Team
29	G	Ed Belfour	6 ft 0 in (183 cm)	214 lb (97 kg)	April 21, 1965 (aged 26)	(United States) Chicago Blackhawks
1	G	Sean Burke	6 ft 4 in (193 cm)	209 lb (95 kg)	January 29, 1967 (aged 24)	(United States) San Diego Gulls
30	G	Bill Ranford	5 ft 11 in (180 cm)	185 lb (84 kg)	December 14, 1966 (aged 24)	(Canada) Edmonton Oilers
77	D	Paul Coffey	6 ft 0 in (183 cm)	201 lb (91 kg)	June 1, 1961 (aged 30)	(United States) Pittsburgh Penguins (Note: Traded to the Los Angeles Kings on February 19, 1992)
48	D	Éric Desjardins	6 ft 1 in (185 cm)	203 lb (92 kg)	June 14, 1969 (aged 22)	(Canada) Montreal Canadiens
2	D	Al MacInnis	6 ft 2 in (188 cm)	201 lb (91 kg)	July 11, 1963 (aged 28)	(Canada) Calgary Flames
55	D	Larry Murphy	6 ft 2 in (188 cm)	209 lb (95 kg)	March 8, 1961 (aged 30)	(United States) Pittsburgh Penguins
5	D	Steve Smith	6 ft 3 in (191 cm)	216 lb (98 kg)	April 30, 1963 (aged 28)	(United States) Chicago Blackhawks
3	D	Scott Stevens	6 ft 2 in (188 cm)	216 lb (98 kg)	April 1, 1964 (aged 27)	(United States) New Jersey Devils
24	D	Mark Tinordi	6 ft 4 in (193 cm)	214 lb (97 kg)	May 9, 1966 (aged 25)	(United States) Minnesota North Stars
27	F	Shayne Corson	6 ft 2 in (188 cm)	207 lb (94 kg)	August 13, 1966 (aged 25)	(Canada) Montreal Canadiens
6	F	Russ Courtnall	5 ft 11 in (180 cm)	174 lb (79 kg)	January 2, 1965 (aged 26)	(Canada) Montreal Canadiens
14	F	Theoren Fleury	5 ft 6 in (168 cm)	181 lb (82 kg)	January 29, 1968 (aged 23)	(Canada) Calgary Flames
33	F	Dirk Graham	5 ft 11 in (180 cm)	198 lb (90 kg)	July 29, 1959 (aged 32)	(United States) Chicago Blackhawks
99	F	Wayne Gretzky (C)	6 ft 0 in (183 cm)	185 lb (84 kg)	January 26, 1961 (aged 30)	(United States) Los Angeles Kings
10	F	Dale Hawerchuk	5 ft 11 in (180 cm)	185 lb (84 kg)	April 4, 1963 (aged 28)	(United States) Buffalo Sabres
28	F	Steve Larmer	5 ft 10 in (178 cm)	190 lb (86 kg)	June 16, 1961 (aged 30)	(United States) Chicago Blackhawks
88	F	Eric Lindros	6 ft 4 in (193 cm)	240 lb (110 kg)	February 28, 1973 (aged 18)	(Canada) Oshawa Generals
11	F	Mark Messier (A)	6 ft 1 in (185 cm)	205 lb (93 kg)	January 18, 1961 (aged 30)	(United States) New York Rangers
20	F	Luc Robitaille	6 ft 1 in (185 cm)	205 lb (93 kg)	February 17, 1966 (aged 25)	(United States) Los Angeles Kings
18	F	Brendan Shanahan	6 ft 3 in (191 cm)	220 lb (100 kg)	January 23, 1969 (aged 22)	(United States) St. Louis Blues
21	F	Brent Sutter (A)	6 ft 0 in (183 cm)	187 lb (85 kg)	June 10, 1962 (aged 29)	(United States) New York Islanders (Note: Traded to the Chicago Blackhawks on October 25, 1991)
22	F	Rick Tocchet	6 ft 0 in (183 cm)	214 lb (97 kg)	April 9, 1964 (aged 27)	(United States) Philadelphia Flyers (Note: Traded to the Pittsburgh Penguins on February 19, 1992)

== Czechoslovakia ==
Head coach: Ivan Hlinka

No.	Pos.	Name	Height	Weight	Birthdate	1991-92 Team
2	G	Dominik Hašek	6 ft 0 in (183 cm)	165 lb (75 kg)	January 29, 1965 (aged 26)	(United States) Chicago Blackhawks (Note: Played 20 games for the Indianapolis Ice, Chicago's IHL affiliate)
30	G	Milan Hnilička	6 ft 1 in (185 cm)	185 lb (84 kg)	June 25, 1973 (aged 18)	(Czechoslovakia) HC Kladno
1	G	Oldřich Svoboda	6 ft 2 in (188 cm)	216 lb (98 kg)	January 28, 1967 (aged 24)	(Czechoslovakia) ASD Dukla Jihlava (Note: Played 14 games for TPS)
18	D	Jerguš Baca	6 ft 1 in (185 cm)	214 lb (97 kg)	January 4, 1965 (aged 26)	(United States) Springfield Indians (Note: Played 1 games for the Hartford Whalers, Springfield's NHL affiliate)
3	D	Leo Gudas	6 ft 0 in (183 cm)	187 lb (85 kg)	May 20, 1965 (aged 26)	(Finland) JyP HT
6	D	František Kučera	6 ft 2 in (188 cm)	205 lb (93 kg)	February 3, 1968 (aged 23)	(United States) Chicago Blackhawks (Note: Played 7 games for the Indianapolis Ice, Chicago's IHL affiliate)
4	D	František Musil (C)	6 ft 3 in (191 cm)	214 lb (97 kg)	December 17, 1964 (aged 26)	(Canada) Calgary Flames
5	D	Kamil Prachař	5 ft 10 in (178 cm)	196 lb (89 kg)	August 24, 1963 (aged 28)	(Czechoslovakia) HC Litvínov
24	D	Jiři Šlégr	6 ft 0 in (183 cm)	223 lb (101 kg)	May 30, 1971 (aged 20)	(Czechoslovakia) HC Litvínov
7	D	Richard Šmehlík	6 ft 2 in (188 cm)	220 lb (100 kg)	January 23, 1970 (aged 21)	(Czechoslovakia) TJ Vítkovice
19	F	Josef Beránek	6 ft 2 in (188 cm)	194 lb (88 kg)	October 25, 1969 (aged 21)	(Canada) Edmonton Oilers
29	F	Zdeno Cíger	6 ft 1 in (185 cm)	190 lb (86 kg)	October 19, 1969 (aged 21)	(United States) New Jersey Devils
18	F	Petr Hrbek	5 ft 11 in (180 cm)	194 lb (88 kg)	April 3, 1969 (aged 22)	(Czechoslovakia) HC Sparta Praha
15	F	Jaromír Jágr	6 ft 2 in (188 cm)	254 lb (115 kg)	February 15, 1972 (aged 19)	(United States) Pittsburgh Penguins
25	F	Tomáš Jelínek	5 ft 10 in (178 cm)	198 lb (90 kg)	April 29, 1962 (aged 29)	(Finland) HPK (Note: Played 6 playoff games for HC Sierre)
12	F	Kamil Kašťák	5 ft 10 in (178 cm)	172 lb (78 kg)	May 8, 1966 (aged 25)	(Czechoslovakia) HC Litvínov
28	F	Ľubomír Kolník	6 ft 1 in (185 cm)	194 lb (88 kg)	January 23, 1968 (aged 23)	(Czechoslovakia) HK Dukla Trenčín
22	F	Robert Kron	5 ft 10 in (178 cm)	183 lb (83 kg)	February 27, 1967 (aged 24)	(Canada) Vancouver Canucks
23	F	Žigmund Pálffy	5 ft 10 in (178 cm)	183 lb (83 kg)	May 5, 1972 (aged 19)	(Czechoslovakia) HK Dukla Trenčín
20	F	Michal Pivoňka	6 ft 2 in (188 cm)	194 lb (88 kg)	January 28, 1966 (aged 25)	(United States) Washington Capitals
26	F	Robert Reichel	5 ft 10 in (178 cm)	183 lb (83 kg)	June 25, 1971 (aged 20)	(Canada) Calgary Flames
16	F	Martin Ručinský	6 ft 2 in (188 cm)	209 lb (95 kg)	March 11, 1971 (aged 20)	(Canada) Cape Breton Oilers (Note: Played two games for the Edmonton Oilers, Cape Breton's NHL affiliate. Traded to the Quebec Nordiques on March 10, 1991; played seven games for the Halifax Citadels, Quebec's AHL affiliate.)
13	F	Richard Žemlička (A)	6 ft 1 in (185 cm)	201 lb (91 kg)	April 13, 1964 (aged 27)	(Czechoslovakia) HC Sparta Praha (Note: Played 18 games for TPS)

== Finland ==
Head coach: Pentti Matikainen

Assistant coach: Sakari Pietilä

No.	Pos.	Name	Height	Weight	Birthdate	1991-92 Team
30	G	Markus Ketterer	5 ft 11 in (180 cm)	179 lb (81 kg)	August 23, 1967 (aged 24)	(Finland) Jokerit
29	G	Jarmo Myllys	5 ft 9 in (175 cm)	172 lb (78 kg)	December 29, 1965 (aged 25)	(United States) San Jose Sharks (Note: Played five games for the Kansas City Blades, San Jose's IHL affiliate)
1	G	Jukka Tammi	5 ft 11 in (180 cm)	172 lb (78 kg)	April 10, 1962 (aged 29)	(Finland) Ilves
4	D	Kari Eloranta	6 ft 2 in (188 cm)	201 lb (91 kg)	February 29, 1956 (aged 35)	(Sweden) Rögle BK
3	D	Pasi Huura	6 ft 4 in (193 cm)	227 lb (103 kg)	March 23, 1966 (aged 25)	(Finland) Lukko
5	D	Timo Jutila	5 ft 10 in (178 cm)	187 lb (85 kg)	December 24, 1963 (aged 27)	(Sweden) Luleå HF
12	D	Janne Laukkanen	6 ft 0 in (183 cm)	187 lb (85 kg)	March 19, 1970 (aged 21)	(Finland) HPK
29	D	Jyrki Lumme	6 ft 1 in (185 cm)	214 lb (97 kg)	July 16, 1966 (aged 25)	(Canada) Vancouver Canucks
2	D	Teppo Numminen	6 ft 1 in (185 cm)	198 lb (90 kg)	July 3, 1968 (aged 23)	(Canada) Winnipeg Jets
6	D	Arto Ruotanen	5 ft 11 in (180 cm)	183 lb (83 kg)	April 11, 1961 (aged 30)	(Sweden) HV71
9	D	Ville Sirén	6 ft 2 in (188 cm)	196 lb (89 kg)	February 11, 1964 (aged 27)	(Finland) Ilves
16	F	Hannu Järvenpää	6 ft 0 in (183 cm)	194 lb (88 kg)	May 19, 1963 (aged 28)	(Sweden) Leksands IF
31	F	Iiro Järvi	6 ft 2 in (188 cm)	201 lb (91 kg)	March 23, 1965 (aged 26)	(Finland) HIFK
24	F	Jarmo Kekäläinen	5 ft 11 in (180 cm)	176 lb (80 kg)	July 3, 1966 (aged 25)	(Finland) KalPa
17	F	Jari Kurri (C)	6 ft 0 in (183 cm)	198 lb (90 kg)	May 18, 1960 (aged 31)	(United States) Los Angeles Kings
20	F	Janne Ojanen	6 ft 2 in (188 cm)	203 lb (92 kg)	April 9, 1968 (aged 23)	(Finland) Tappara
27	F	Timo Peltomaa	6 ft 1 in (185 cm)	209 lb (95 kg)	July 26, 1968 (aged 23)	(Finland) Ilves
21	F	Christian Ruuttu	6 ft 0 in (183 cm)	201 lb (91 kg)	February 24, 1964 (aged 27)	(United States) Buffalo Sabres
8	F	Teemu Selänne	6 ft 0 in (183 cm)	201 lb (91 kg)	July 3, 1970 (aged 21)	(Finland) Jokerit
14	F	Petri Skriko	5 ft 10 in (178 cm)	172 lb (78 kg)	March 13, 1962 (aged 29)	(United States) Boston Bruins (Note: Traded to the Winnipeg Jets on October 29, 1991)
25	F	Raimo Summanen	5 ft 11 in (180 cm)	196 lb (89 kg)	March 2, 1962 (aged 29)	(Finland) Ilves
10	F	Esa Tikkanen	6 ft 1 in (185 cm)	209 lb (95 kg)	January 25, 1965 (aged 26)	(Canada) Edmonton Oilers
22	F	Pekka Tirkkonen	6 ft 2 in (188 cm)	214 lb (97 kg)	July 17, 1968 (aged 23)	(Finland) KalPa

== Sweden ==
Head coach: Conny Evensson

Assistant coaches: Curt Lundmark

No.	Pos.	Name	Height	Weight	Birthdate	1991-92 Team
1	G	Fredrik Andersson	5 ft 9 in (175 cm)	181 lb (82 kg)	February 28, 1968 (aged 23)	(Sweden) MoDo Hockey
30	G	Rolf Ridderwall	5 ft 11 in (180 cm)	172 lb (78 kg)	November 20, 1958 (aged 32)	(Sweden) Team Boro HC
35	G	Tommy Söderström	5 ft 9 in (175 cm)	165 lb (75 kg)	July 17, 1969 (aged 22)	(Sweden) Djurgårdens IF
3	D	Tommy Albelin	6 ft 1 in (185 cm)	194 lb (88 kg)	May 21, 1964 (aged 27)	(United States) New Jersey Devils (Note: Played 11 games for the Utica Devils, New Jersey's AHL affiliate)
19	D	Peter Andersson	6 ft 0 in (183 cm)	181 lb (82 kg)	March 2, 1962 (aged 29)	(Sweden) IF Björklöven
6	D	Calle Johansson	5 ft 11 in (180 cm)	203 lb (92 kg)	February 14, 1967 (aged 24)	(United States) Washington Capitals
4	D	Nicklas Lidström	6 ft 1 in (185 cm)	190 lb (86 kg)	April 28, 1970 (aged 21)	(United States) Detroit Red Wings
21	D	Börje Salming	6 ft 1 in (185 cm)	209 lb (95 kg)	April 17, 1951 (aged 40)	(Sweden) AIK
28	D	Kjell Samuelsson	6 ft 6 in (198 cm)	231 lb (105 kg)	October 18, 1958 (aged 32)	(United States) Philadelphia Flyers (Note: Traded to the Pittsburgh Penguins on February 19, 1992)
5	D	Ulf Samuelsson	6 ft 1 in (185 cm)	203 lb (92 kg)	March 26, 1964 (aged 27)	(United States) Pittsburgh Penguins
34	F	Mikael Andersson	6 ft 2 in (188 cm)	194 lb (88 kg)	July 6, 1959 (aged 32)	(United States) Hartford Whalers
24	F	Niklas Andersson	5 ft 9 in (175 cm)	176 lb (80 kg)	May 20, 1971 (aged 20)	(Canada) Halifax Citadels
22	F	Charles Berglund	5 ft 9 in (175 cm)	176 lb (80 kg)	January 18, 1965 (aged 26)	(Sweden) Djurgårdens IF
18	F	Jonas Bergqvist	6 ft 0 in (183 cm)	203 lb (92 kg)	September 26, 1962 (aged 28)	(Sweden) Leksands IF
29	F	Ulf Dahlén	6 ft 2 in (188 cm)	198 lb (90 kg)	January 21, 1967 (aged 24)	(United States) Minnesota North Stars
23	F	Lars Edström	5 ft 11 in (180 cm)	198 lb (90 kg)	July 16, 1966 (aged 25)	(Sweden) Luleå HF
27	F	Tomas Forslund	6 ft 0 in (183 cm)	212 lb (96 kg)	November 24, 1968 (aged 22)	(Canada) Calgary Flames (Note: Played 22 games for the Salt Lake Golden Eagles, Calgary's IHL affiliate)
15	F	Johan Garpenlöv	6 ft 0 in (183 cm)	185 lb (84 kg)	March 21, 1968 (aged 23)	(United States) Detroit Red Wings (Note: Played nine games for the Adirondack Red Wings, Detroit's AHL affiliate. Traded to the San Jose Sharks on March 9, 1992)
26	F	Mats Näslund	5 ft 7 in (170 cm)	161 lb (73 kg)	October 31, 1959 (aged 31)	(Sweden) Malmö IF
9	F	Thomas Rundqvist (C)	6 ft 3 in (191 cm)	196 lb (89 kg)	May 4, 1960 (aged 31)	(Sweden) Färjestad BK
7	F	Tomas Sandström	6 ft 2 in (188 cm)	209 lb (95 kg)	September 4, 1964 (aged 27)	(United States) Los Angeles Kings
17	F	Thomas Steen	5 ft 10 in (178 cm)	172 lb (78 kg)	June 8, 1960 (aged 31)	(Canada) Winnipeg Jets
13	F	Mats Sundin	6 ft 5 in (196 cm)	231 lb (105 kg)	February 13, 1971 (aged 20)	(Canada) Quebec Nordiques

== United States ==
Head coaches: Bob Johnson, Tim Taylor

Assistant coaches: Mike Eaves, Jay Leach, Barry Smith

No.	Pos.	Name	Height	Weight	Birthdate	1991-92 Team
35	G	Pat Jablonski	6 ft 0 in (183 cm)	181 lb (82 kg)	June 20, 1967 (aged 24)	(United States) St. Louis Blues (Note: Played eight games for the Peoria Rivermen, St. Louis's IHL affiliate)
1	G	Mike Richter	5 ft 11 in (180 cm)	185 lb (84 kg)	September 22, 1966 (aged 24)	(United States) New York Rangers
34	G	John Vanbiesbrouck	5 ft 8 in (173 cm)	176 lb (80 kg)	September 4, 1963 (aged 28)	(United States) New York Rangers
26	D	Chris Chelios	6 ft 0 in (183 cm)	192 lb (87 kg)	January 25, 1962 (aged 29)	(United States) Chicago Blackhawks
4	D	Kevin Hatcher	6 ft 3 in (191 cm)	231 lb (105 kg)	September 9, 1966 (aged 25)	(United States) Washington Capitals
6	D	Jim Johnson	6 ft 1 in (185 cm)	190 lb (86 kg)	August 9, 1962 (aged 29)	(United States) Minnesota North Stars
2	D	Brian Leetch	6 ft 1 in (185 cm)	187 lb (85 kg)	March 3, 1968 (aged 23)	(United States) New York Rangers
20	D	Gary Suter	6 ft 0 in (183 cm)	205 lb (93 kg)	July 24, 1964 (aged 27)	(Canada) Calgary Flames
38	D	Eric Weinrich	6 ft 1 in (185 cm)	209 lb (95 kg)	December 19, 1966 (aged 24)	(United States) New Jersey Devils
39	D	Craig Wolanin	6 ft 3 in (191 cm)	205 lb (93 kg)	July 27, 1967 (aged 24)	(Canada) Quebec Nordiques
24	F	Doug Brown	5 ft 10 in (178 cm)	185 lb (84 kg)	June 12, 1964 (aged 27)	(United States) New Jersey Devils
27	F	Dave Christian	5 ft 11 in (180 cm)	176 lb (80 kg)	May 12, 1959 (aged 32)	(United States) St. Louis Blues
21	F	Tony Granato	5 ft 10 in (178 cm)	187 lb (85 kg)	July 24, 1964 (aged 27)	(United States) Los Angeles Kings
15	F	Brett Hull	5 ft 11 in (180 cm)	201 lb (91 kg)	August 9, 1964 (aged 27)	(United States) St. Louis Blues
23	F	Craig Janney	6 ft 0 in (183 cm)	201 lb (91 kg)	September 26, 1967 (aged 23)	(United States) Boston Bruins (Note: Traded to the St. Louis Blues on February 7, 1992)
16	F	Pat LaFontaine	5 ft 10 in (178 cm)	181 lb (82 kg)	February 22, 1965 (aged 26)	(United States) Buffalo Sabres
32	F	Kevin Miller	5 ft 11 in (180 cm)	185 lb (84 kg)	September 2, 1965 (aged 26)	(United States) Detroit Red Wings
9	F	Mike Modano	6 ft 3 in (191 cm)	207 lb (94 kg)	June 7, 1970 (aged 21)	(United States) Minnesota North Stars
7	F	Joe Mullen	5 ft 10 in (178 cm)	183 lb (83 kg)	February 26, 1957 (aged 34)	(United States) Pittsburgh Penguins
12	F	Eddie Olczyk	6 ft 1 in (185 cm)	201 lb (91 kg)	August 16, 1966 (aged 25)	(Canada) Winnipeg Jets
29	F	Joel Otto (C)	6 ft 4 in (193 cm)	220 lb (100 kg)	October 29, 1961 (aged 29)	(Canada) Calgary Flames
17	F	Jeremy Roenick	6 ft 1 in (185 cm)	205 lb (93 kg)	January 17, 1970 (aged 21)	(United States) Chicago Blackhawks
33	F	Randy Wood	6 ft 0 in (183 cm)	196 lb (89 kg)	October 12, 1963 (aged 27)	(United States) New York Islanders (Note: Traded to the Buffalo Sabres on October 25, 1991)

== USSR ==
Head coach: Viktor Tikhonov

Assistant coaches: Igor Dmitriyev, Vladimir Yurzinov

No.	Pos.	Name	Height	Weight	Birthdate	1991-92 Team
30	G	Alexei Maryin	6 ft 0 in (183 cm)	192 lb (87 kg)	October 29, 1964 (aged 26)	(Soviet Union) Spartak Moskva
20	G	Mikhail Shtalenkov	6 ft 1 in (185 cm)	183 lb (83 kg)	October 20, 1965 (aged 25)	(Soviet Union) Dynamo Moskva
1	G	Andrei Trefilov	6 ft 0 in (183 cm)	181 lb (82 kg)	August 31, 1969 (aged 22)	(Soviet Union) Dynamo Moskva
6	D	Dmitri Filimonov	6 ft 6 in (198 cm)	238 lb (108 kg)	October 14, 1971 (aged 19)	(Soviet Union) Dynamo Moskva
5	D	Alexei Gusarov	6 ft 1 in (185 cm)	198 lb (90 kg)	July 8, 1964 (aged 27)	(Canada) Quebec Nordiques (Note: Played three games for the Halifax Citadels, Quebec's AHL affiliate)
7	D	Alexei Kasatonov	6 ft 1 in (185 cm)	196 lb (89 kg)	October 14, 1959 (aged 31)	(United States) New Jersey Devils
3	D	Igor Kravchuk (C)	6 ft 1 in (185 cm)	205 lb (93 kg)	September 13, 1966 (aged 25)	(Soviet Union) CSKA Moskva (Note: Played 36 games for the Chicago Blackhawks)
4	D	Vladimir Malakhov	6 ft 4 in (193 cm)	229 lb (104 kg)	August 30, 1968 (aged 23)	(Soviet Union) CSKA Moskva
14	D	Dmitri Mironov	6 ft 3 in (191 cm)	214 lb (97 kg)	December 25, 1965 (aged 25)	(Soviet Union) Krylya Sovetov Moscow (Note: Played seven games for the Toronto Maple Leafs)
8	D	Mikhail Tatarinov	5 ft 10 in (178 cm)	194 lb (88 kg)	July 16, 1966 (aged 25)	(Canada) Quebec Nordiques
23	F	Alexei Zhitnik	5 ft 10 in (178 cm)	203 lb (92 kg)	October 10, 1972 (aged 18)	(Soviet Union) CSKA Moskva
22	F	Vyacheslav Bykov	5 ft 8 in (173 cm)	203 lb (92 kg)	July 24, 1960 (aged 31)	(Soviet Union) CSKA Moskva
18	F	Sergei Fedorov	6 ft 1 in (185 cm)	205 lb (93 kg)	December 13, 1969 (aged 21)	(United States) Detroit Red Wings
16	F	Alexander Galchenyuk	5 ft 11 in (180 cm)	192 lb (87 kg)	July 28, 1967 (aged 24)	(Soviet Union) Dynamo Moskva
15	F	Viktor Gordiyuk	5 ft 11 in (180 cm)	190 lb (86 kg)	April 11, 1970 (aged 21)	(Soviet Union) Krylya Sovetov Moskva
12	F	Ravil Khaidarov	5 ft 9 in (175 cm)	187 lb (85 kg)	December 25, 1966 (aged 24)	(Soviet Union) Dynamo Moskva
11	F	Igor Korolev	6 ft 2 in (188 cm)	198 lb (90 kg)	September 6, 1970 (aged 21)	(Soviet Union) Dynamo Moskva
27	F	Andrei Kovalenko	6 ft 0 in (183 cm)	227 lb (103 kg)	June 7, 1970 (aged 21)	(Soviet Union) CSKA Moskva
9	F	Vyacheslav Kozlov	5 ft 10 in (178 cm)	192 lb (87 kg)	May 3, 1972 (aged 19)	(Soviet Union) CSKA Moscow (Note: Played seven games for the Detroit Red Wings)
19	F	Andrei Lomakin	5 ft 9 in (175 cm)	174 lb (79 kg)	April 4, 1964 (aged 27)	(Soviet Union) Dynamo Moskva (Note: Played 57 games for the Philadelphia Flyers)
24	F	Vitali Prokhorov	5 ft 10 in (178 cm)	165 lb (75 kg)	December 25, 1966 (aged 24)	(Soviet Union) Spartak Moskva
21	F	Alexander Semak	5 ft 9 in (175 cm)	183 lb (83 kg)	February 11, 1966 (aged 25)	(Soviet Union) Dynamo Moskva (Note: Played 25 games for the New Jersey Devils and seven games for the Utica Devils)
26	F	Alexei Zhamnov	6 ft 0 in (183 cm)	194 lb (88 kg)	October 1, 1970 (aged 20)	(Soviet Union) Dynamo Moskva
