= Ransford =

Given name

Ransford is a given name and a surname. Notable people with the name include:

Given name:

- Ransford Addo (born 1983), football player from Ghana
- Ransford Braham, Jamaican politician
- Ransford Brempong (born 1981), Canadian professional basketball player
- Ransford D. Bucknam (1866–1919), Nova Scotian who became a Pasha, admiral in the Turkish navy and vice-admiral to the Turkish empire
- Ransford Doherty, American actor
- Ransford Goodluck (born 1976), British sport shooter
- Erasmus Ransford Tawiah Madjitey, CBE (1920–1996), Ghanaian police officer, diplomat and politician
- Ransford Koufie (born 2002), Ghanaian professional footballer
- Ransford Osei (born 1990), professional footballer
- Ransford Selasi (born 1996), Ghanaian professional footballer
- Ransford Smith, CD (born 1949), senior public servant from Jamaica
- Ransford-Yeboah Königsdörffer (born 2001), Ghanaian professional footballer
- Homer Ransford Watson (1855–1936), Canadian landscape painter

Surname:

- Charles Ransford, M.D., British physician, Fellow of the Royal College of Physicians of Edinburgh, early advocate of homoeopathic medicine
- Edwin Ransford (1805–1876), English singer and composer
- James Ransford (1884–1929), English footballer
- Maurice Ransford (1896–1968), American art director
- Tessa Ransford (1938–2015), poet and founder of the Scottish Poetry Library in 1984
- Thomas Ransford Ph.D. Sc.D (born 1958), British-born Canadian mathematician, researching in spectral theory and complex analysis
- Vernon Ransford (1885–1958), Australian cricketer

== See also ==
- Mashreghi-Ransford inequality
- Bransford
- Cransford
- Rainsford
- Raynsford
