= Ranford (surname) =

Ranford is an English-language surname, a variation of the toponymic surname Rainford from the village Rainford, Lancashire. Notable people with the surname include:

- Bill Ranford (born 1966), Canadian ice hockey player
- Brendan Ranford (born 1992), Canadian ice hockey player

== See also ==
- Ranford (disambiguation)
- Rainforth, variant spelling
- Rainsford, variant spelling
