= Koufie =

Koufie is a surname. Notable people with the surname include:

- Ben Koufie (1932–2016), Ghanaian footballer and sports administrator
- Ransford Koufie (born 2002), Ghanaian footballer
