= Kevin Hatcher =

American ice hockey player (born 1966)

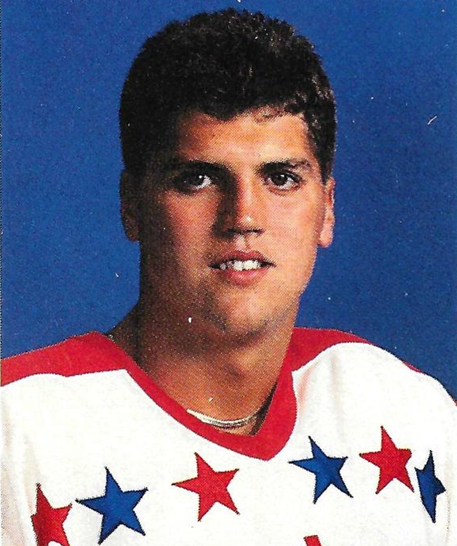
- Hatcher with the Washington Capitals in 1986
- Born: September 9, 1966 (age 59) Detroit, Michigan, U.S.
- Height: 6 ft 4 in (193 cm)
- Weight: 232 lb (105 kg; 16 st 8 lb)
- Position: Defense
- Shot: Right
- Played for: Washington Capitals; Dallas Stars; Pittsburgh Penguins; New York Rangers; Carolina Hurricanes
- National team: United States
- NHL draft: 17th overall, 1984; Washington Capitals
- Playing career: 1984–2001

Kevin John Hatcher (born September 9, 1966) is an American former professional ice hockey defenseman who played in the National Hockey League (NHL) for 17 seasons between 1984 and 2001 for the Washington Capitals, Dallas Stars, Pittsburgh Penguins, New York Rangers and Carolina Hurricanes. He is the older brother of former NHL player Derian Hatcher, with whom he was inducted into the United States Hockey Hall of Fame on October 21, 2010. Hatcher was born in Detroit, Michigan, but grew up in Sterling Heights, Michigan.

== Early life ==
Hatcher was born on September 9, 1966, in Detroit, Michigan, US to Eric and Carol Hatcher. He grew up in Sterling Heights, Michigan alongside his brothers Mark and Derian and two younger sisters. While Eric was a semi-professional football player, he felt ice hockey was a better sport for kids than football. As such, Hatcher began playing organized hockey at the age of four.

== Playing career ==
=== Amateur ===
As a youth, Hatcher played in the 1979 Quebec International Pee-Wee Hockey Tournament with the Michigan Hylanders. He then played for the Little Caesars 15U AAA team and Detroit Compuware Ambassadors while enrolled at Stevenson High School. As a member of the Ambassadors, he helped them win the 1983 Midget Nationals championships. Hatcher left the Ambassadors after his junior year at Stevenson. upon being drafted by the North Bay Centennials of the Ontario Hockey League (OHL). He chose to play major junior hockey in Canada, rather than remain in Detroit, as he believed it would be the fastest route to the National Hockey League (NHL). However, he had informed all OHL clubs prior to the 1983 OHL draft that he would only play in the league if the Centennials drafted him as they were the team his brother played for.

Hatcher joined his brother Mark on the Centennials for the 1983–84 season and scored his first OHL goal on October 10, 1983, against the Toronto Marlboros. By the mid-point of his rookie season, Hatcher had tallied four goals and 20 assists through 36 games. As a result of his play, he was ranked 22nd amongst all eligible skaters by the NHL Central Scouting Bureau and was named to Team USA's roster for the 1984 World Junior Ice Hockey Championships. Hatcher improved his ranking by the end of the season to 17th overall after finishing with 10 goals and 39 assists. Due to his late birthday, Hatcher was the youngest player available in the 1984 NHL entry draft. He was subsequently drafted in the first round, 17th overall, by the Washington Capitals. Prior to the draft, Hatcher stated he would not mind being drafted by the Capitals as they told him they "let players learn from their mistakes."

After signing a contract with the Capitals on September 6, 1984, Hatcher participated in their training camp and scored five points through six preseason games. However, due to his young age and other strong players available, he was reassigned to the OHL for the 1984–85 season. As an 18-year old, Hatcher led all defensemen in regular-season scoring with 26 goals and 37 assists. He finished the 1985 OHL playoffs with five goals and eight assists and was named to the OHL's Second All-Star Team.

=== Washington Capitals ===
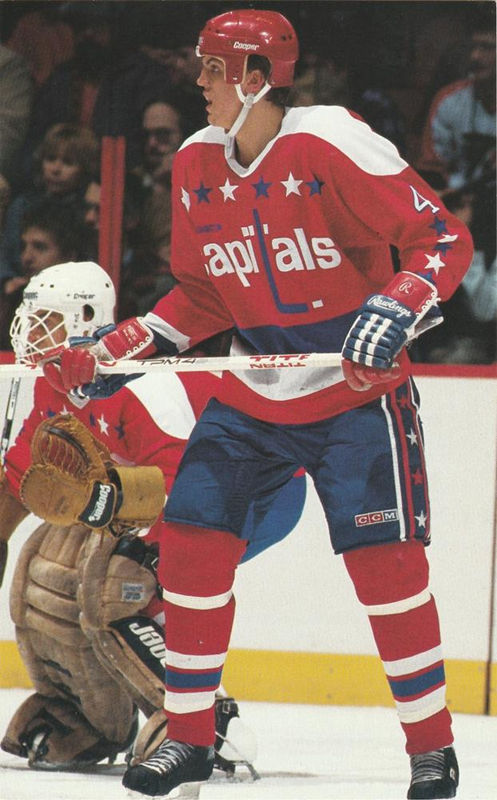
Hatcher for the Washington Capitals in 1987

The Washington Capitals recalled Hatcher to the NHL level for the final two games of the 1984–85 regular season. He made his NHL debut on April 6, 1985, against the Pittsburgh Penguins, as a replacement for an injured Peter Andersson. While he did not score any points, head coach Bryan Murray praised his stay-at-home defensive style of play. Hatcher played in his second game the following day and scored his first NHL goal. At 18 years, 210 days old, Hatcher became the second youngest defensemen in franchise history to score his first NHL goal with the team. As the Capitals qualified for the 1985 Stanley Cup playoffs, he made his postseason debut in their first round series against the New York Islanders. At the age of 18 and seven months, Hatcher became the youngest player to appear in a playoff game.

Over the 1985 offseason, Hatcher worked on his strength and cardio abilities to boost his chances of making the Capitals opening night roster. The departures of Mike McEwen and Dave Shand over the offseason also opened up a spot on the Capitals 1985–86 roster for him. Hatcher finished his rookie season with nine goals and 10 assists for 19 points. He later credited the defensive-mindedness of the team for making his transition to the NHL easier. As a result of his successful rookie season, the league named Hatcher to the 1986 NHL All-Rookie Team.

Hatcher struggled to match his previous season's success in the 1986–87 season and drew immediate concerns from the coaching staff. They pinpointed the second week of training camp as the point at which Hatcher began to struggle. He began to improve in January after sitting as a healthy scratch for two games and working with assistant coach Terry Murray.

After representing the United States at the 1987 Canada Cup, Hatcher returned to the Capitals training camp for his third season with the team. However, the day before the start of the 1987–88 season, it was announced that he would miss the first three weeks due to a knee injury. Hatcher played a vital role for the Capitals during the 1988 Stanley Cup playoffs. In their first round series against the Philadelphia Flyers, he set a franchise record for points by a defenceman in a single playoff series.

After tallying four goals and 19 assists through 43 games, Hatcher was selected to participate in the 1990 NHL All-Star Game. He helped the Capitals advance to the 1990 Stanley Cup playoffs but suffered a knee injury in Game 5 of their series against the New York Rangers. At the time of the injury, he had accumulated eight assists over 11 games. As a result of the injury, Hatcher sat out for the entirety of the Capitals series against the Boston Bruins.

During the Capitals 1992–93 exhibition games, head coach Terry Murray made Hatcher a temporary captain. This extended into the regular season as Hatcher replaced Rod Langway as team captain while the latter was injured. On January 13, 1993, Hatcher recorded three goals and an assist in a 5–4 win over the Rangers. He subsequently became the first Capitals defenseman to record a hat-trick and finished the season with a franchise record 34 goals. In February, Hatcher officially replaced Langway as team captain. In this role he reached the 30-goal mark and helped all Capitals defensemen set a new league record for most combined points by defensemen on one team. He finished the season with 79 points to clinch second place on the Capitals all-time points list for defenseman in a single season.

=== Dallas Stars ===
After refusing to sign with the Capitals, Hatcher was traded to the Dallas Stars on January 18, 1995 in exchange for Mark Tinordi and Rick Mrozik.

=== Pittsburgh Penguins ===
Hatcher spent two seasons with the Stars before being traded to the Penguins in exchange for Sergei Zubov following the 1995–96 season. However, the Penguins had a difficult time informing him that he had been traded due to his affinity for remaining off the grid during the summer.

=== New York Rangers ===
Prior to the start of the 1999–00 season, Hatcher was acquired by the New York Rangers in exchange for defenseman Peter Popovic.

== Personal life ==
Hatcher's daughter Hannah is married to NHL goaltender Tristan Jarry. After retiring, Hatcher and his brother Derian opened a bar/restaurant in Utica, Michigan.

== Awards and achievements ==
- Selected to five NHL All-Star Games: 1990, 1991, 1992, 1996, 1997
- United States Hockey Hall of Fame, 2010 inductee

== Career statistics ==
=== Regular season and playoffs ===
			Regular season					Playoffs
Season	Team	League	GP	G	A	Pts	PIM	GP	G	A	Pts	PIM
1982–83	Detroit Compuware Ambassadors	MNHL	75	30	45	75	120	—	—	—	—	—
1983–84	North Bay Centennials	OHL	67	10	39	49	61	4	2	2	4	11
1984–85	North Bay Centennials	OHL	58	26	37	63	75	8	5	8	13	9
1984–85	Washington Capitals	NHL	2	1	0	1	0	1	0	0	0	0
1985–86	Washington Capitals	NHL	79	9	10	19	119	9	1	1	2	19
1986–87	Washington Capitals	NHL	78	8	16	24	144	7	1	0	1	20
1987–88	Washington Capitals	NHL	71	14	27	41	137	14	5	7	12	55
1988–89	Washington Capitals	NHL	62	13	27	40	101	6	1	4	5	20
1989–90	Washington Capitals	NHL	80	13	41	54	102	11	0	8	8	32
1990–91	Washington Capitals	NHL	79	24	50	74	69	11	3	3	6	8
1991–92	Washington Capitals	NHL	79	17	37	54	105	7	2	4	6	19
1992–93	Washington Capitals	NHL	83	34	45	79	114	6	0	1	1	14
1993–94	Washington Capitals	NHL	72	16	24	40	108	11	3	4	7	37
1994–95	Dallas Stars	NHL	47	10	19	29	66	5	2	1	3	2
1995–96	Dallas Stars	NHL	74	15	26	41	58	—	—	—	—	—
1996–97	Pittsburgh Penguins	NHL	80	15	39	54	103	5	1	1	2	4
1997–98	Pittsburgh Penguins	NHL	74	19	29	48	66	6	1	0	1	12
1998–99	Pittsburgh Penguins	NHL	66	11	27	38	24	13	2	3	5	4
1999–2000	New York Rangers	NHL	74	4	19	23	38	—	—	—	—	—
2000–01	Carolina Hurricanes	NHL	57	4	14	18	38	6	0	0	0	6
NHL totals			1,157	227	450	677	1,392	118	22	37	59	252

=== International ===
Year	Team	Event	GP	G	A	Pts	PIM
1984	United States	WJC	7	1	0	1	0
1987	United States	CC	5	0	0	0	4
1991	United States	CC	8	0	4	4	12
1996	United States	WCH	7	0	3	3	4
1998	United States	OG	4	0	2	2	0
Senior totals			24	0	9	9	20

== See also ==
- List of NHL players with 1,000 games played

Preceded by Scott Stevens	Washington Capitals first-round draft pick 1984	Succeeded by Yvon Corriveau
Preceded by Rod Langway	Washington Capitals captain 1992–1994	Succeeded by Dale Hunter
