= 42nd National Hockey League All-Star Game =

Professional ice hockey exhibition game

42nd NHL All-Star Game
	1	2	3	Total
Wales	1	2	2	5
Campbell	2	5	4	11
- Date: January 19, 1991
- Arena: Chicago Stadium
- City: Chicago
- MVP: Vincent Damphousse (Toronto)
- Attendance: 18,472

The 42nd National Hockey League All-Star Game took place in Chicago Stadium, home of the Chicago Blackhawks, on January 19, 1991.

== Commissioner's Choice ==
The 1991 game saw much controversy in team selection, as Wales head coach Mike Milbury included enforcer Chris Nilan and checker Brian Skrudland ahead of scorer Kirk Muller and retiring legend Guy Lafleur. However, Nilan and Skrudland would both be sidelined due to injury. As a result of criticism of Milbury's picks, the league's board of governors quickly stated that future teams would be chosen by committee.

One immediate effect of this was the ability for the league president (after 1993, the commissioner) to appoint two "senior" players to honor their years in the game (one for each team) - Guy Lafleur and Bobby Smith were the first two stars appointed in this manner. Previously, while the NHL president often selected soon-to-be retiring stars to the game (for instance, the 1980 game featured Gordie Howe, Phil Esposito, and Jean Ratelle at the request of coach Scotty Bowman), this became a tradition starting in 1991.

The other change, which would not happen until a year later, was because only two goaltenders were selected for the all-star game: as Edmonton Oilers coach John Muckler also coached the Campbell squad, many were considerably irked when Oilers goalie Bill Ranford was chosen over Chicago's own Ed Belfour, who was at the time the best goaltender that season, leading to the Chicago fans booing Ranford when he replaced starter Mike Vernon in the second period. To avoid this, Muckler suggested that three goaltenders should be selected in the future, with each goaltender playing a period - and the league made it so.

== The War on Fighting ==
The 42nd classic was broadcast not only in the U.S. and Canada, but for soldiers abroad fighting in Operation Desert Storm, and players wore decals on their helmets as a symbolic gesture of support. However, some, like Wayne Gretzky (whose grandfather was a veteran of World War I and whose cousin was abroad at the time), called for the game to be canceled.

American broadcaster NBC broke away from the telecast in the third period to televise a briefing from The Pentagon involving the Gulf War. SportsChannel America included the missing coverage in a replay of NBC's telecast (NBC owned 50% of Rainbow Enterprises, the parent of SportsChannel America).

== Heroes' Fall ==
Unlike the previous year, the Heroes of Hockey game was contested between Blackhawks alumni and the "best of the rest", akin to the all-star games of old. However, it was without its boycotters. Joining Gordie Howe were some of the greatest players of all, including Bobby Orr, Ted Lindsay, and Frank Mahovlich (Bobby Hull was also notably opposed, but played anyway due to the game being in Chicago). At the center of this argument, however, were pensions: the National Hockey League Alumni Association believed that there was a $12 million pension surplus in which they were entitled to, and one of the more convincing arguments to support their case was that 26-year veteran Howe was being paid only $1200 per month from this pension fund - noticeably below what he would have gotten if he had pursued a career elsewhere, as he noted.

== Super Skills Competition ==
The Wales Conference won its first Super Skills competition in All-Star Game history, although the majority of the individual events was won by Campbell Conference participants. Even though Al MacInnis won the Hardest Shot event he was 3 mph off of breaking Al Iafrate's mark that was set in the 1990 Super Skills. However, Mark Messier and Patrick Roy would establish new individual events records.

=== Individual event winners ===
- Accuracy Shooting - Mark Messier (Edmonton Oilers) - 4 hits, 6 shots
- Hardest Shot - Al MacInnis (Calgary Flames) - 94.0 mph
- Goaltenders Competition - Patrick Roy (Montreal Canadiens) - 2 GA, 25 shots

== The game ==
Toronto Maple Leafs' left winger Vincent Damphousse scored four goals as the Campbell Conference defeated the Wales Conference 11–5 in front of a sell-out crowd at Chicago Stadium and a worldwide television audience that was the largest in All-Star Game history. Damphousse tallied three of his four goals in the third period to be named All-Star M.V.P. and would become just the third player in All-Star Game history to record 4 goals in a game, which is shared by Wayne Gretzky and Mario Lemieux. Damphousse's performance also overshadowed a five-point performance by St. Louis Blues center Adam Oates who recorded one goal and four assists in the game.

=== Summary ===
	Campbell Conference	Wales Conference
Final score	11	5
Scoring summary	Gagner (Roenick, Larmer) 6:17 first; Damphousse (Oates, S. Smith) 11:36 first; Suter (unassisted) 5:23 second; Gretzky (Sandstrom) 9:10 second; Oates (Yzerman) 9:48 second; Fleury (Messier, Chelios) 14:40 second (GWG); Roenick (S. Smith, Oates) 17:07 second; Chelios (Roenick, Larmer) 5:23 third; Damphousse (Oates, Housley) 8:54 third; Damphousse (Housley, Oates) 11:40 third; Damphousse (unassisted) 17:16 third	LaFontaine (Turcotte) 9:14 first; LaFontaine (Hatcher) 1:33 second; Tocchet (Verbeek, Sakic) 15:36 second; MacLean (Cullen, Bourque) 2:29 third (PPG); Stevens (Tocchet) 13:56 third (PPG)
Penalties	Housley, holding 0:57 third; Housley, tripping 12:26 third	
Shots on goal	15–15–11–41	10–9–22–41
Win/loss	W - Bill Ranford	L - Andy Moog

- National anthems: Wayne Messmer (CAN), Wayne Messmer (USA)
- Referee: Terry Gregson
- Linesmen: Jerry Pateman, Dan Schachte
- TV: NBC, TSN, SRC

== Rosters ==
	Campbell Conference	Wales Conference
Head coach	(Canada) John Muckler (Edmonton Oilers)	(United States) Mike Milbury (Boston Bruins)
Honorary captain	(Canada) Stan Mikita	(Canada) Jean Beliveau
Lineup	Starting lineup: (Canada) 2 - D Al MacInnis (Calgary Flames); (United States) 7 - D Chris Chelios (Chicago Blackhawks), Alternate; (Canada) 12 - C Adam Oates (St. Louis Blues)+; (Canada) 21 - LW Luc Robitaille (Los Angeles Kings); (Canada) 30 - G Mike Vernon (Calgary Flames); (Canada) 99 - C Wayne Gretzky (Los Angeles Kings), Captain; Commissioner's selection: (Canada) 18 - C Bobby Smith (Minnesota North Stars); Reserves: (Canada) 1 - G Bill Ranford (Edmonton Oilers); (Canada) 3 - D Scott Stevens (St. Louis Blues); (Canada) 5 - D Steve Smith (Edmonton Oilers); (United States) 6 - D Phil Housley (Winnipeg Jets); (Sweden) 8 - RW Tomas Sandstrom (Los Angeles Kings); (Canada) 10 - LW Vincent Damphousse (Toronto Maple Leafs); (Canada) 11 - C Mark Messier (Edmonton Oilers), Alternate; (Canada) 14 - RW Theoren Fleury (Calgary Flames); (Canada) 15 - C Dave Gagner (Minnesota North Stars); (Canada) 17 - RW Trevor Linden (Vancouver Canucks); (Canada) 19 - C Steve Yzerman (Detroit Red Wings); (United States) 20 - D Gary Suter (Calgary Flames); (United States) 27 - C Jeremy Roenick (Chicago Blackhawks); (Canada) 28 - RW Steve Larmer (Chicago Blackhawks)	Starting lineup: (Canada) 7 - D Paul Coffey (Pittsburgh Penguins); (Canada) 8 - RW Cam Neely (Boston Bruins); (Canada) 19 - C Joe Sakic (Quebec Nordiques); (Canada) 22 - RW Rick Tocchet (Philadelphia Flyers), Alternate; (Canada) 33 - G Patrick Roy (Montreal Canadiens); (Canada) 77 - D Ray Bourque (Boston Bruins), Captain; Commissioner's selection: (Canada) 10 - RW Guy Lafleur (Quebec Nordiques), Alternate; Reserves: (United States) 2 - D Brian Leetch (New York Rangers); (United States) 4 - D Kevin Hatcher (Washington Capitals); (Germany) 5 - D Uwe Krupp (Buffalo Sabres); (United States) 9 - C Darren Turcotte (New York Rangers); (Canada) 11 - C John Cullen (Pittsburgh Penguins); (Canada) 12 - RW Mark Recchi (Pittsburgh Penguins); (Canada) 15 - RW John MacLean (New Jersey Devils); (Canada) 16 - LW Pat Verbeek (Hartford Whalers); (United States) 17 - C Pat LaFontaine (New York Islanders); (Canada) 18 - C Denis Savard (Montreal Canadiens); (United States) 25 - LW Kevin Stevens (Pittsburgh Penguins); (United States) 27 - RW Dave Christian (Boston Bruins); (Canada) 28 - D Garry Galley (Boston Bruins); (Canada) 35 - G Andy Moog (Boston Bruins)

== See also ==
- 1990–91 NHL season

== Notes ==
- Brett Hull was voted as a starter, but was unable to play due to injury. Adam Oates was his replacement.
- Chris Nilan and Brian Skrudland were named to the Wales team, but did not play.
- Larry Robinson was named to the Campbell team, but did not play.
- It was at this game, where the tradition of cheering during the United States National Anthem prior to every Chicago Blackhawks game was introduced to the Nation. The practice had been a Hawks tradition at Chicago Stadium since the 1985 semi-finals against the heavily-favored Edmonton Oilers during the Wayne Gretzky dynasty. This tradition carried over to the United Center and is still done today before all Blackhawks' home games. Blackhawks' fans also kept with this tradition for their 2 home Bridgestone Winter Classic and Stadium Series games (2009 at Wrigley Field and 2014 at Soldier Field).
