= Timo Peltomaa =

Finnish ice hockey player

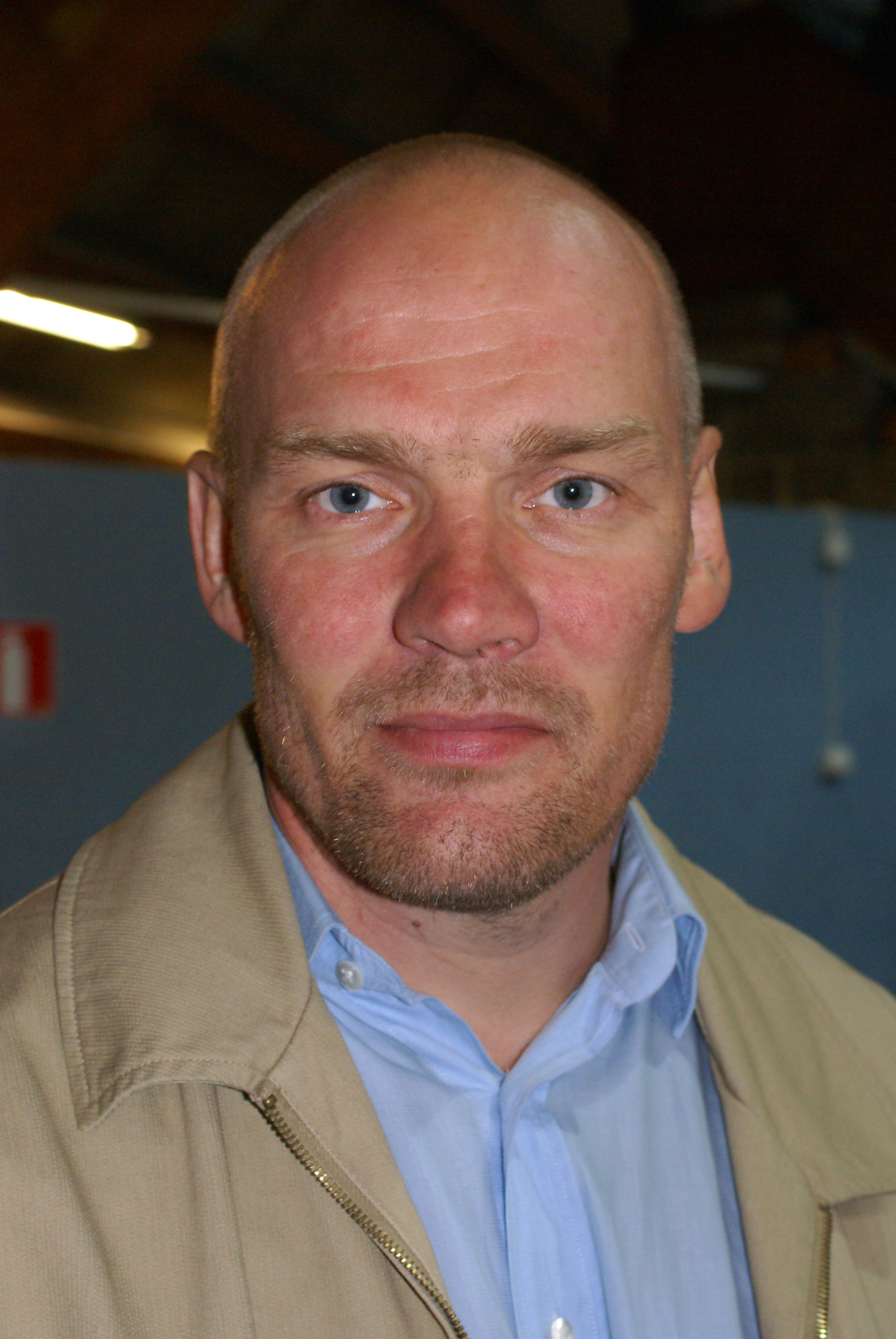
- Timo Peltomaa in 2009
- Born: 26 July 1968 (age 57) Toijala, Finland
- Height: 6 ft 1 in (185 cm)
- Weight: 209 lb (95 kg; 14 st 13 lb)
- Position: Right wing
- Shot: Right
- Played for: Ilves; HPK; Frankfurt Lions; Augsburger Panther; Lukko; Timrå IK
- National team: Finland
- NHL draft: 154th overall, 1988; Los Angeles Kings
- Playing career: 1987–2005

Timo Peltomaa (born 26 July 1968) is a Finnish former professional ice hockey player. He competed in the men's tournament at the 1992 Winter Olympics.

== Career statistics ==
=== Regular season and playoffs ===
			Regular season					Playoffs
Season	Team	League	GP	G	A	Pts	PIM	GP	G	A	Pts	PIM
1985–86	Ilves	FIN U20	3	0	1	1	4	—	—	—	—	—
1986–87	Ilves	FIN U20	32	8	3	11	38	—	—	—	—	—
1987–88	Ilves	FIN U20	28	26	12	38	69	5	3	0	3	30
1987–88	Ilves	SM-l	22	0	1	1	20	2	0	0	0	6
1988–89	Ilves	FIN U20	25	22	12	34	45	—	—	—	—	—
1988–89	Ilves	SM-l	23	4	0	4	16	4	0	0	0	2
1989–90	Ilves	SM-l	43	7	3	10	28	9	4	0	4	14
1990–91	Ilves	SM-l	44	8	16	24	63	—	—	—	—	—
1991–92	Ilves	SM-l	40	16	14	30	40	—	—	—	—	—
1992–93	Ilves	SM-l	39	13	21	34	40	4	2	0	2	8
1993–94	Ilves	SM-l	45	12	16	28	118	—	—	—	—	—
1994–95	Ilves	SM-l	49	11	11	22	62	—	—	—	—	—
1995–96	HPK	SM-l	50	11	20	31	90	9	1	3	4	14
1996–97	Frankfurt Lions	DEL	47	7	16	23	86	9	0	4	4	6
1997–98	Augsburger Panther	DEL	40	5	7	12	22	6	0	1	1	0
1998–99	Ilves	SM-l	49	5	14	19	74	4	0	2	2	2
1999–2000	Lukko	SM-l	54	4	27	31	71	4	1	0	1	8
2000–01	Timrå IK	SEL	48	9	9	18	105	—	—	—	—	—
2001–02	Timrå IK	SEL	45	1	11	12	34	—	—	—	—	—
2002–03	Ilves	SM-l	54	5	14	19	125	—	—	—	—	—
2003–04	Ilves	SM-l	32	3	8	11	28	7	0	1	1	0
2004–05	Ilves	SM-l	50	5	10	15	63	7	0	0	0	4
SM-l totals			594	104	175	279	838	54	9	5	14	60
DEL totals			87	12	23	35	108	15	0	5	5	6
SEL totals			93	10	20	30	139	—	—	—	—	—

=== International ===
Year	Team	Event	GP	G	A	Pts	PIM
1988	Finland	WJC	6	0	3	3	2
1991	Finland	WC	10	0	2	2	8
1991	Finland	CC	6	0	1	1	4
1992	Finland	OG	8	0	0	0	2
1992	Finland	WC	5	4	1	5	4
1993	Finland	WC	5	0	0	0	6
Senior totals			34	4	4	8	24

"Timo Peltomaa". Elite Prospects.
