= Rainforth =

Rainforth is an English-language surname, a variation of the toponymic surname Rainford from the village Rainford, Lancashire. Notable people with the surname include:

- Elizabeth Rainforth (1814–1877), British opera singer and music arranger
- John Rainforth (born 1934), British bobsledder
- Janine Rainforth, British singer-songwriter

== See also ==
- Rainsford, variant spelling
- Ranford (surname), variant spelling
- James Renforth, (1842–1871), English Tyneside professional oarsman
