= Viktor Gordiuk =

Russian ice hockey player

- Born: April 11, 1970 (age 56) Odintsovo, Russian SFSR, Soviet Union
- Height: 5 ft 10 in (178 cm)
- Weight: 178 lb (81 kg; 12 st 10 lb)
- Position: Right Wing
- Shot: Right
- Played for: SKA Saint Petersburg; Lada Togliatti; Khimik Voskresensk; HC MVD; Spartak Moscow; Dynamo Moscow; Salavat Yulaev Ufa; Düsseldorfer EG; Buffalo Sabres; Krylya Sovetov Moscow
- National team: Soviet Union
- NHL draft: 142nd overall, 1990; Buffalo Sabres
- Playing career: 1987–2010

Viktor Iosifovich Gordiyuk (Russian: Виктор Иосифович Гордиюк; born April 11, 1970) is a Russian former ice hockey right wing. He played 26 games in the National Hockey League (NHL) with the Buffalo Sabres between 1992 and 1995. The rest of his career, which lasted from 1987 to 2010, was mainly spent in Russia. Internationally Gordiyuk played for the Soviet Union at several junior tournaments and at the 1991 Canada Cup.

== Career ==
Gordiyuk was drafted in the seventh round, 142nd overall, by the Buffalo Sabres in the 1990 NHL entry draft.

Gordiyuk played six seasons in the Soviet Union with Krylya Sovetov Moscow before making his North American debut with the Sabres' American Hockey League affiliate, the Rochester Americans, in the 1992–93 season. He also appeared in sixteen National Hockey League games with Buffalo that season, scoring three goals and adding six assists.

Gordiyuk remained in the Sabres' organization for two more seasons, appearing in ten more games with Buffalo during the 1994–95 season and spending the remainder of the time in Rochester. After one season in the International Hockey League, Gordiyuk went to Germany for five seasons, playing in the Deutsche Eishockey Liga for Düsseldorfer EG.

Gordiyuk returned to his native Russia for the remainder of his career, retiring in 2010. In his NHL career, Gordiouk appeared in 26 games; he scored three goals and added eight assists.

== Career statistics ==
=== Regular season and playoffs ===
			Regular season					Playoffs
Season	Team	League	GP	G	A	Pts	PIM	GP	G	A	Pts	PIM
1986–87	Krylya Sovetov Moscow	USSR	2	0	0	0	0	—	—	—	—	—
1987–88	Krylya Sovetov Moscow	USSR	26	2	2	4	6	—	—	—	—	—
1988–89	Krylya Sovetov Moscow	USSR	41	5	1	6	10	—	—	—	—	—
1989–90	Krylya Sovetov Moscow	USSR	48	11	4	15	24	—	—	—	—	—
1990–91	Krylya Sovetov Moscow	USSR	46	12	10	22	22	—	—	—	—	—
1991–92	Krylya Sovetov Moscow	CIS	36	15	5	20	20	6	1	2	3	4
1992–93	Buffalo Sabres	NHL	16	3	6	9	0	—	—	—	—	—
1992–93	Rochester Americans	AHL	35	11	14	25	8	17	9	9	18	4
1993–94	Rochester Americans	AHL	74	28	39	67	26	4	3	0	3	2
1994–95	Rochester Americans	AHL	63	31	30	61	36	3	0	0	2	0
1994–95	Buffalo Sabres	NHL	10	0	2	2	0	—	—	—	—	—
1995–96	Los Angeles Ice Dogs	IHL	68	17	44	61	53	—	—	—	—	—
1995–96	Utah Grizzlies	IHL	13	4	4	8	6	22	4	6	10	14
1996–97	Düsseldorfer EG	DEL	47	20	16	36	26	4	0	2	2	2
1997–98	Düsseldorfer EG	DEL	49	14	17	31	22	3	0	0	0	2
1998–99	Düsseldorfer EG	GER-2	58	36	52	88	46	7	0	7	7	0
1999–00	Düsseldorfer EG	GER-2	49	21	32	53	85	12	5	9	14	14
2000–01	Düsseldorfer EG	DEL	60	17	13	30	32	—	—	—	—	—
2001–02	Salavat Yulaev Ufa	RSL	18	1	5	6	8	—	—	—	—	—
2001–02	Krylya Sovetov Moscow	RSL	29	8	9	17	45	3	0	1	1	2
2002–03	Dynamo Moscow	RSL	9	0	2	2	2	—	—	—	—	—
2002–03	Krylya Sovetov Moscow	RSL	29	4	4	8	22	—	—	—	—	—
2003–04	Spartak Moscow	RUS-2	54	17	19	36	24	13	1	6	7	0
2004–05	HC MVD	RUS-2	51	13	22	35	32	13	3	7	10	6
2004–05	HC MVD-THK Tver	RUS-3	1	0	1	1	0	—	—	—	—	—
2005–06	Krylya Sovetov Moscow	RUS-2	38	10	19	29	16	17	5	5	10	40
2006–07	Khimik Voskresensk	RUS-2	44	16	26	42	56	14	6	12	18	18
2007–08	Lada Togliatti	RSL	9	1	3	4	4	—	—	—	—	—
2007–08	Lada–2 Togliatti	RUS-3	2	1	2	3	0	—	—	—	—	—
2007–08	Khimik Voskresensk	RUS-2	35	10	23	33	28	14	2	4	6	10
2008–09	Khimik Voskresensk	KHL	38	9	11	20	30	—	—	—	—	—
2008–09	SKA Saint Petersburg	KHL	13	3	1	4	24	3	0	1	1	4
2009–10	Khimik Voskresensk	RUS-2	46	9	27	36	42	5	3	3	6	2
USSR/CIS totals			199	45	22	67	82	6	1	2	3	4
NHL totals			26	3	8	11	0	—	—	—	—	—

=== International ===
Year	Team	Event	GP	G	A	Pts	PIM
1987	Soviet Union	EJC	7	8	3	11	0
1988	Soviet Union	EJC	6	2	1	3	4
1989	Soviet Union	WJC	7	3	4	7	0
1990	Soviet Union	WJC	7	3	6	9	2
1991	Soviet Union	CC	5	0	2	2	0
Junior totals			27	16	14	30	6
Senior totals			5	0	2	2	0
