= Rainford (surname) =

Rainford is an English-language toponymic surname from the village Rainford, Lancashire. Notable people with the surname include:

- Charles Rainford (born 1998), British racing driver
- Dave Rainford (born 1979), English footballer
- Johnny Rainford (1930–2001), English footballer
- Molly Rainford (born 2000), English actress and singer, daughter of Dave Rainford
- Phil Rainford, British singer and record producer
- Rob Rainford (born 1966), Canadian television chef

== See also ==
- Ebony-Jewel Rainford-Brent (born 1983), English cricketer
- Rainford Hugh Perry (1936–2021), Jamaican reggae musician

== See also ==
- Rainforth, variant spelling
- Rainsford, variant spelling
- Ranford (surname), variant spelling
