= Steve Larmer =

Canadian ice hockey player (born 1961)

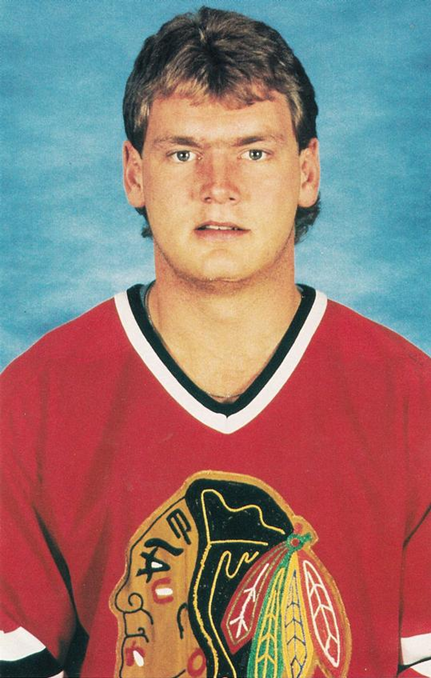
- Larmer with the Chicago Blackhawks in 1986
- Born: June 16, 1961 (age 65) Peterborough, Ontario, Canada
- Height: 5 ft 10 in (178 cm)
- Weight: 190 lb (86 kg; 13 st 8 lb)
- Position: Right wing
- Shot: Left
- Played for: Chicago Blackhawks; New York Rangers
- National team: Canada
- NHL draft: 120th overall, 1980; Chicago Black Hawks
- Playing career: 1980–1995
Medal record
Representing Canada
Ice hockey
Canada Cup
Gold medal – first place	1991 Canada
World Championships
Silver medal – second place	1991 Canada

Steven Donald Larmer (born June 16, 1961) is a Canadian former professional ice hockey player who was a right winger for 15 seasons in the National Hockey League (NHL) for the Chicago Blackhawks and New York Rangers.

After excelling in the Ontario Major Junior Hockey League, Larmer was selected by the Chicago Black Hawks in 1980 in the sixth round of the NHL draft. After spending most of his first two seasons in the minor leagues, he became a regular presence for the team in the 1982–83 season, where he recorded 43 goals in the first of eleven straight seasons with at least 70 points while being awarded the Calder Memorial Trophy for his rookie play. He would go on to have five 40-goal seasons for Chicago and play 884 consecutive games for the team, which ranked as the third-highest consecutive game streak in NHL history at the time. A contract dispute at the start of the 1993–94 season saw him sitout the first thirteen games of the season before he was eventually part of a three-team trade that saw him land with the New York Rangers, where he recorded 60 points in 68 games before playing in all 23 games of the run to the Stanley Cup Final that saw New York win in seven games. In the 1994–95 season, his final one as a player, he recorded his 1,000th career point prior to playing 1,000 career games and retired at the age of 33 with over 400 goals. A two-time All-Star, Larmer made the Stanley Cup playoffs in each of his thirteen full seasons as a player.

Internationally, he represented the Canadian team in 1991 for the Men's Ice Hockey World Championships and the Canada Cup, which saw him win the latter with a go-ahead goal in the finals and lead all players in goals scored.

He is the brother of Jeff Larmer, who played with Steven for Chicago from 1983 to 1986.

== Early life ==
Larmer was born in Peterborough, Ontario. He played hockey from a young age with St. James in the Peterborough Church Hockey League. As a youth, Larmer played in the 1974 Quebec International Pee-Wee Hockey Tournament with a minor ice hockey team from Peterborough. He made the Peterborough Petes as a walk-on player and played for the team in the 1977–78 season; he credited head coach Gary Green as a positive influence that made him feel comfortable on a team with considerable veteran presence. He scored 24 goals in 62 games. He was traded to the Niagara Falls Flyers after the season, where he would play for the next three years, with his final two seasons seeing him record consecutive 100-point seasons. He was drafted as the 120th overall pick of the 1980 NHL draft by the Chicago Black Hawks (apparently, Larmer was helping to install a swimming pool at the time he was drafted).

== Professional career ==
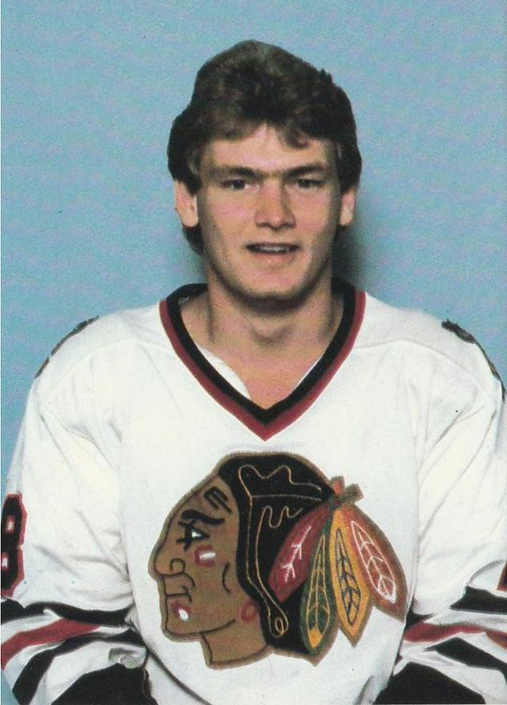
Larmer with the Black Hawks in 1984.

Larmer appeared in four games of the 1980–81 season and three games of the 1981–82 season, recording one total assist while spending the latter with the New Brunswick Hawks of the American Hockey League, who won the Calder Cup. He became a regular starter with the 1982–83 season; after playing seven games in those two years with the #31, Larmer was assigned the #28 in training camp, which he kept for the rest of his career. In his first official year as a rookie, he had 43 goals (second most among his teammates) and 47 assists for a 90-point season with a career-high plus-minus of +44 and was awarded the Calder Memorial Trophy for his rookie play and was named to the NHL All-Rookie Team as the team won the Norris Division and made it to the Conference Finals. He followed the season with a 35-goal campaign and 75 total points that saw him go through a slump in January that saw him express frustration with "not playing smart". He rebounded in the 1984–85 campaign with 46 goals and 86 total points that saw him finish 8th in Byng Trophy voting. For the 1980s, Larmer was often placed on the same line with left winger Al Secord and centre Denis Savard that saw them nicknamed "The Party Line". He was selected to the All-Star Game for the first time in the 1989–90 season; he had 31 goals and 59 assists for a 90-point season. In the 1990 Stanley Cup playoffs, Larmer had seven goals and 15 assists. In Game 7 of the Division Finals against the St. Louis Blues, he had a short-handed goal (the first shorthanded goal for Chicago in a Game 7) and four assists in the 8–2 victory; his five total points set an NHL record for most points in a game seven. In the Conference Finals versus the Edmonton Oilers, he had five total points as Chicago was eliminated in six games.

In November 1990 of the 1990–91 season, playing in his option year, Larmer signed a four-year contract worth $3.1 million to stay with the Blackhawks that would raise his pay (which would go from $290,000 to $750,000) and keep him with the team for the next three years in what was reported as the largest contract negotiated by the team in their history. He was later named to the 1991 All-Star Game (held in Chicago) while having his lone 100-point season with 44 goals and 57 assists. He finished 3rd in Selke Trophy voting and 5th for the Hart Trophy. In the summer of 1991, Larmer was selected to the Canada Cup team for Canada and played on team's top line with Wayne Gretzky, where Larmer led the entire competition in goals (6) and ranked second in points (11) behind only Gretzky. In the best-of-three finals against Team USA, Larmer scored the go-ahead goal for Canada in the third period on a shorthanded play with seven minutes remaining in Game 2 to help clinch the tournament. In the 1992 Stanley Cup playoffs, the Blackhawks made a run to the Stanley Cup Final and Larmer contributed eight goals and six assists. In the Final against the Pittsburgh Penguins, he was limited to just one assist as the team was swept in four games. Reportedly, Larmer was one of the players discussed by the Blackhawks in a potential trade with the Quebec Nordiques for Eric Lindros in the 1992 offseason but nothing came of it.

In May 1993, Larmer told team GM Bob Pulford of his desire to be traded. The two sides would engage in a standoff for the next couple of months that saw Chicago claim salary demands as a reason for delaying a trade and Larmer considering the possibility of retiring. When the 1993–94 season started, Larmer decided to continue his holdout, which ended his consecutive game streak. From 1982 to 1993, Larmer had played in 884 consecutive games for the Blackhawks, an NHL record for most consecutive games played with the same team, and the third longest consecutive-games streak in league history at that time (he was 80 games away from passing both of Garry Unger and Doug Jarvis). The impasse was resolved by Larmer being traded from Chicago on November 2, 1993 in a four-player deal that first sent him (alongside Bryan Marchment) to the Hartford Whalers for left winger Patrick Poulin and defensemen Eric Weinrich. The Whalers (who momentarily debated keeping Larmer) then sent him alongside two players (Nick Kypreos, Barry Richter) and a draft pick to the New York Rangers (coached by Mike Keenan, Larmer's former coach in Chicago) in exchange for James Patrick and Darren Turcotte.

In his first game with the team the very next day, he recorded a goal against the Vancouver Canucks. He served as alternate captain for the team. In 68 total games, he had 21 goals and 39 assists for 60 points. He missed three games when he was slashed on the hand in a game against Calgary that saw him require surgery for a broken pinkie finger. In the 1994 Stanley Cup playoffs, he scored nine goals and recorded seven assists (which included goals in four of the first five games of the Stanley Cup Final) as the Rangers defeated the Canucks in seven games to win the Stanley Cup.

In the strike-shortened 1994–95 season, Larmer played in 47 games, missing just one game. On March 8, 1995, Larmer had a four-point night against the New Jersey Devils at Madison Square Garden that saw him record his 1,000th career point (the 43rd player to reach the milestone) on an assist along with scoring the game-winning goal. On April 20, he played in his 1,000th game against the Hartford Whalers. On the season, he had fourteen goals with fifteen assists for a total of 29 points. In July 1995, Larmer quietly announced that he was retiring.

After retirement, he served as the NHLPA director of player relations from 1998 to 2005. He later served on the NHLPA advisory board before resigning in 2009.

== Legacy ==
A talented skater on both ends of the ice, Larmer received Frank J. Selke Trophy votes on five occasions (1989-17th, 1991-3rd, 1992-8th, 1993-10th, 1994-13th) as the best defensive forward in the league. He received votes for the Lady Byng Memorial Trophy on five occasions. In his career span of 1980 to 1995, he was 18th of 18 players to record 1,000 points; taking out his two brief stints in the 1980 and 1981 seasons, Larmer is one of twelve with 1,000 points from 1982 to 1995. Larmer departed the Blackhawks as the all-time leader in power play goals (153), a record he still holds as of 2026. He ranks fourth in goals (406), fifth in points (923), and seventh in assists (517), all done within 891 games.

On a Chicago team that had players such as Denis Savard and later Jeremy Roenick, Larmer led the team in scoring three times and finished second to either Savard or Roenick six times. He recorded eleven straight 70-point seasons with the team, the most in franchise history and one of only nine players to do so in NHL history. His five 40-goal seasons for Chicago is second most in franchise history behind only Bobby Hull.

In a 2020 interview, Savard described Larmer as "the smartest player I ever played with by far. He was calm. He was the type of player that made good decisions with the puck but never be rushed...He always had that composure like no one. When we left each other to play for other teams, I was never the same player. Part of it is not playing with Larmer. He was able to get me the puck in situations where I had time and space.” Averaging 1.01 points per game in 1,006 games played, Larmer is one of 37 players to average a point with at least 1,000 games played in NHL history. Despite his accomplishments for Chicago, his number 28 jersey has yet to be retired by the team (which has been debated by journalists and several Blackhawk alumni) although Larmer himself has stated that it "should be for the very special."

In 1998, he was inducted into the Peterborough and District Sports Hall of Fame. In 2026, he was inducted as part of the inaugural class of the Blackhawks Hall of Fame.

== Career statistics ==
=== Regular season and playoffs ===
			Regular season					Playoffs
Season	Team	League	GP	G	A	Pts	PIM	GP	G	A	Pts	PIM
1977–78	Peterborough Petes	OMJHL	62	24	17	41	51	18	5	7	12	27
1977–78	Peterborough Petes	MC	—	—	—	—	—	3	1	3	4	11
1978–79	Niagara Falls Flyers	OMJHL	66	37	47	84	108	20	11	13	24	43
1979–80	Niagara Falls Flyers	OMJHL	67	45	69	114	71	10	5	9	14	15
1980–81	Niagara Falls Flyers	OHL	61	55	78	133	73	12	13	8	21	24
1980–81	Chicago Black Hawks	NHL	4	0	1	1	0	—	—	—	—	—
1981–82	Chicago Black Hawks	NHL	3	0	0	0	0	—	—	—	—	—
1981–82	New Brunswick Hawks	AHL	74	38	44	82	46	15	6	6	12	0
1982–83	Chicago Black Hawks	NHL	80	43	47	90	28	11	5	7	12	8
1983–84	Chicago Black Hawks	NHL	80	35	40	75	34	5	2	2	4	7
1984–85	Chicago Black Hawks	NHL	80	46	40	86	16	15	9	13	22	14
1985–86	Chicago Black Hawks	NHL	80	31	45	76	47	3	0	3	3	4
1986–87	Chicago Blackhawks	NHL	80	28	56	84	22	4	0	0	0	2
1987–88	Chicago Blackhawks	NHL	80	41	48	89	42	5	1	6	7	0
1988–89	Chicago Blackhawks	NHL	80	43	44	87	54	16	8	9	17	22
1989–90	Chicago Blackhawks	NHL	80	31	59	90	40	20	7	15	22	8
1990–91	Chicago Blackhawks	NHL	80	44	57	101	79	6	5	1	6	4
1991–92	Chicago Blackhawks	NHL	80	29	45	74	65	18	8	7	15	6
1992–93	Chicago Blackhawks	NHL	84	35	35	70	48	4	0	3	3	0
1993–94	New York Rangers	NHL	68	21	39	60	41	23	9	7	16	14
1994–95	New York Rangers	NHL	47	14	15	29	16	10	2	2	4	6
NHL totals			1,006	441	571	1,012	532	140	56	75	131	95

=== International ===
Year	Team	Event	GP	G	A	Pts	PIM
1991	Canada	WC	10	5	3	8	4
1991	Canada	CC	8	6	5	11	4
Senior totals			18	11	8	19	8

== Awards and achievements ==
- Calder Cup champion – 1982
- Calder Memorial Trophy – 1983
- NHL All-Rookie Team – 1983
- NHL All-Star Game – 1990, 1991
- Stanley Cup champion – 1994

=== NHL Records ===
- Most game-winning goals by a rookie in one season: 9 (shared with Marek Svatoš)
- Most assists in a game seven: 4 (1990 Division Finals)
- Most points in a game seven: 5 (1990 Division Finals)
- Highest Plus-minus in a game seven: +4 (shared with twelve other players)

== See also ==
- List of NHL players with 100-point seasons

Preceded by Dale Hawerchuk	Winner of the Calder Memorial Trophy; 1983	Succeeded by Tom Barrasso
