= Graham Allan =

English mathematician

Graham Robert Allan
- Born: 13 August 1936; Southgate, London, England
- Died: 9 August 2007 (aged 70)
- Education: Sidney Sussex College, University of Cambridge
- Awards: Junior Berwick Prize (1969)
- Scientific career
- Fields: Banach algebras
- Workplaces: University of Cambridge; Leeds University; Newcastle University
- Thesis: Locally Convex Algebras (1964)
- Doctoral advisor: Frank Smithies
- Doctoral students: Thomas Ransford

Graham Robert Allan (13 August 1936 – 9 August 2007) was an English mathematician, specializing in Banach algebras. He was Reader in functional analysis and Vice-Master of Churchill College at Cambridge University.

== Life ==
Allan was born on 13 August 1936 in Southgate, Middlesex, England. After serving in the Royal Air Force from 1955 to 1957, he entered Sidney Sussex College, Cambridge, and continued at Cambridge for his graduate studies, receiving a PhD in 1964 under the supervision of Frank Smithies.

Allan spent most of his career at Cambridge, with interludes as a Lecturer in Pure Mathematics at Newcastle University from 1967 to 1969 and as Professor of Pure Mathematics at the University of Leeds from 1970 to 1978.

Back at Cambridge, he was promoted to Reader in 1980 and was Vice-Master of Churchill College from 1990 to 1993. Allan supervised the theses of over 20 Cambridge PhD students. He retired in 2003, but continued teaching after his retirement. He died on 9 August 2007 in Cambridge.

In 1969, Allan won the Junior Berwick Prize of the London Mathematical Society.

He contributed to section III.86 in the book The Princeton Companion to Mathematics edited by Timothy Gowers, but did not live to see his article "The Spectrum" in print form published in 2008.
