= Lars Edström (ice hockey) =

Swedish ice hockey player

Personal information
- Nationality: Swedish
- Born: 16 July 1966 (age 59) Glommersträsk, Sweden

Sport
- Sport: Ice hockey

Lars Edström (born 16 July 1966) is a Swedish ice hockey player. He competed in the men's tournament at the 1992 Winter Olympics.

== Career statistics ==
=== Regular season and playoffs ===
			Regular season					Playoffs
Season	Team	League	GP	G	A	Pts	PIM	GP	G	A	Pts	PIM
1982–83	Piteå IF	SWE.2	6	2	1	3	4	—	—	—	—	—
1983–84	Piteå IF	SWE.2	27	15	4	19	8	—	—	—	—	—
1984–85	Piteå IF	SWE.2	28	12	15	27	10	—	—	—	—	—
1985–86	Piteå IF	SWE.2	32	17	23	40	32	—	—	—	—	—
1986–87	Piteå HC	SWE.2	32	30	29	59	34	—	—	—	—	—
1987–88	Luleå HF	SEL	6	0	1	1	2	—	—	—	—	—
1988–89	Luleå HF	SEL	13	5	6	11	6	3	0	0	0	0
1988–89	Piteå HC	SWE.2	9	7	3	10	0	—	—	—	—	—
1989–90	Luleå HF	SEL	32	11	15	26	16	4	0	2	2	0
1990–91	Luleå HF	SEL	37	8	19	27	41	5	4	1	5	0
1991–92	Luleå HF	SEL	35	16	20	36	20	1	0	0	0	0
1992–93	Luleå HF	SEL	39	13	20	33	14	11	2	1	3	20
1993–94	Luleå HF	SEL	40	14	9	23	22	—	—	—	—	—
1994–95	Västra Frölunda HC	SEL	19	4	1	5	4	—	—	—	—	—
1994–95	Västra Frölunda HC	Allsv	14	12	7	19	19	—	—	—	—	—
1995–96	Västra Frölunda HC	SEL	38	4	8	12	4	13	1	2	3	4
1996–97	Västra Frölunda HC	SEL	48	10	5	15	36	3	0	0	0	4
1997–98	Luleå HF	SEL	46	8	11	19	20	3	0	0	0	6
1998–99	Luleå HF	SEL	50	12	19	31	44	7	0	2	2	10
1999–2000	Luleå HF	SEL	48	11	17	28	16	8	1	1	2	0
2000–01	Luleå HF	SEL	45	4	11	15	37	—	—	—	—	—
SWE.2 totals			134	83	75	158	88	—	—	—	—	—
SEL totals			496	120	162	282	282	58	8	9	17	44

=== International ===
Year	Team	Event	GP	G	A	Pts	PIM
1984	Sweden	EJC	5	2	0	2	4
1991	Sweden	CC	6	0	1	1	0
1992	Sweden	OG	8	4	0	4	4
Senior totals			14	4	1	5	4

"Lars Edström". Elite Prospects.
