= Ranford (disambiguation) =

Ranford is a town in Western Australia.

Ranford may also refer to:

- Ranford Road, a road in Perth, Australia
- Ranford (surname), a surname
