= Mashreghi–Ransford inequality =

In Mathematics, the Mashreghi–Ransford inequality is a bound on the growth rate of certain sequences. It is named after J. Mashreghi and T. Ransford.

Let $(a_n)_{n \geq 0}$ be a sequence of complex numbers, and let

$$b_n = \sum_{k=0}^n {n\choose k} a_k, \qquad (n \geq 0),$$

and

$$c_n = \sum_{k=0}^n (-1)^{k} {n\choose k} a_k, \qquad (n \geq 0).$$

Here the binomial coefficients are defined by

$${n\choose k} = \frac{n!}{k! (n-k)!}.$$

Assume that, for some $\beta>1$, we have $b_n = O(\beta^n)$ and $c_n = O(\beta^n)$ as $n \to \infty$. Then Mashreghi-Ransford showed that

$a_n = O(\alpha^n)$, as $n \to \infty$,

where $\alpha=\sqrt{\beta^2-1}.$ Moreover, there is a universal constant $\kappa$ such that

$$\left( \limsup_{n \to \infty} \frac{|a_n|}{\alpha^n} \right) \leq \kappa \, \left( \limsup_{n \to \infty} \frac{|b_n|}{\beta^n} \right)^{\frac{1}{2}}  \left( \limsup_{n \to \infty} \frac{|c_n|}{\beta^n} \right)^{\frac{1}{2}}.$$

The precise value of $\kappa$ is still unknown. However, it is known that

$$\frac{2}{\sqrt{3}}\leq \kappa \leq 2.$$
