= Thomas Ransford =

British scientist (born 1958)

Thomas Joseph Ransford
- Born: 1 November 1958 (age 67); Greenwich, London, England
- Education: Trinity College, Cambridge
- Spouse: Line Baribeau
- Children: 2
- Scientific career
- Fields: Banach algebras Potential Theory
- Workplaces: Université Laval
- Thesis: Analytic Multivalued Functions (1984)
- Doctoral advisor: Graham Allan
- Website: www.mat.ulaval.ca/departement-et-professeurs/direction-personnel-et-etudiants/professeurs/fiche-de-professeur/show/ransford-thomas/

Thomas Ransford (born 1958) is a British-born Canadian mathematician, known for his research in spectral theory and complex analysis. He holds a Canada Research Chair in mathematics at Université Laval.

Ransford earned his PhD from the University of Cambridge in 1984.

== Career ==
He was a fellow of Trinity College, University of Cambridge, from 1983 to 1987.

In addition to over 90 research papers on mathematics, he has written a research monograph "Potential Theory in the Complex Plane" in 1995, and the graduate book "A Primer on the Dirichlet Space" with Omar El-Fallah, Karim Kellay and Javad Mashreghi in 2014 .

He has proved results on potential theory, functional analysis, the theory of capacity, and probability. For example, with Javad Mashreghi he proved the Mashreghi–Ransford inequality. He also derived a short elementary proof of Stone–Weierstrass theorem .
