= Raynsford =

Raynsford is a surname. Notable people include:

- Helene Raynsford (born 1979), British rower
- James Raynsford (1891–1956), American footballer
- John Raynsford (1482–1559), English politician
- Richard Raynsford (1605–1680), English judge
- Nick Raynsford (born 1945), British politician

== See also ==
- Rainsford
