= James Ransford =

English footballer

Personal information
- Full name: James Ransford
- Date of birth: 1884
- Place of birth: Blackwell, Bolsover, England
- Date of death: 1929 (aged 44–45)
- Position: Centre forward

Senior career*
Years	Team	Apps	(Gls)
1902–1903	Blackwell		
1903–1904	Ripley Athletic		
1904–1905	Blackwell		
1905–1906	Alfreton Town		
1906–1907	Derby County	15	(3)
1907	Alfreton Town		
1908	Sutton Junction		
Total		15	(3)
- * Club domestic league appearances and goals

James Ransford (1884–1929) was an English footballer who played in the Football League for Derby County.
