= Rainsford =

Surname

Rainsford is an English-language surname, a variation of the toponymic surname Rainford from the village Rainford, Lancashire. Other variants include Raynsford, Rainforth, and Ranford. Notable people with the Rainsford surname variant include:

- Andrew Rainsford Wetmore (1820–1892), New Brunswick politician and jurist
- Charles Rainsford (1728–1809), British Army officer
- Ed Rainsford (born 1984), Zimbabwean cricketer
- George Payne Rainsford James (1799–1860), English novelist and historical writer
- George Rainsford (politician) (1873–1940), Australian politician
- George Rainsford (actor), English actor
- Harold Rainsford Stark (1880–1972), officer in the United States Navy during World War I and World War II
- Jenny Rainsford (1986–) English actress
- Jill Rainsford (1905–1994), actress, songwriter, painter and author
- Marcus Rainsford (c. 1758 – 1817) Officer in the British Army, serving in the Battle of Camden 1780, during the American Revolutionary War, and historical author
- Sir Mark Rainsford (c. 1652 – 1709), Irish Lord Mayor of Dublin and the original founder of the St James' Gate (Guinness) Brewery
- Peter Rainsford Brady (1825–1902), American military officer, surveyor and politician
- Sarah Rainsford BBC foreign correspondent
- Rainey Qualley (born 1989), singer and actress, uses the name Rainsford while releasing and writing music

Fictional characters

- Sanger Rainsford, from Richard Connell's 1924 short story "The Most Dangerous Game"

== See also ==
- Rainsford Historic District, group of Victorian houses in Cheyenne, Wyoming, many designed by architect George D. Rainsford
- Rainsford Island, 11-acre island in the Boston Harbor, between Long Island and Peddocks Island

== See also ==
- Rainforth, variant spelling
- Ranford (surname), variant spelling
- Raynsford, variant spelling
