= Mike Pelino =

Canadian ice hockey coach (born 1959)

Michael Pelino (born November 13, 1959) is a Canadian ice hockey coach. He has been serving as the head coach of Lokomotiv Yaroslavl of the Kontinental Hockey League (KHL) since 2019.

== Career ==
Pelino was born in Welland, Ontario. He played varsity ice hockey at the University of Toronto from 1979 to 1984. He won the 1984 OUAA and CIAU championships with the Blues, while making the Canadian All-Star team and earning OUAA first team distinction.

During his ten-year tenure as head coach of Brock University (1987 - 1997), Pelino was named OUA West Division Coach of the Year three times (1988, 1989, and 1995).

In 1991, as a member of the coaching staff, he helped Team Canada win the Canada Cup. Serving as head coach, he guided Canada’s under-18 national team to victory at the 1996 Pacific Cup and was an assistant coach on Canada’s gold-winning squad at the 1997 World Junior Championship.

Following his ten-year stint as head coach of Brock University, which ended in 1997, Pelino was appointed assistant coach of the Spokane Chiefs of the Western Hockey League. He spent two seasons with the Spokane team.

In August 1999, Pelino joined Hockey Canada, serving as associate coach and assistant general manager of the men's national team, winning gold at the 2000 Nagano Cup (as assistant coach), the 2002 Olympic Games in Salt Lake City (as assistant coach, video), as well as at the 2003 and 2004 World Championships (as assistant coach). As head coach, he guided Canada to victory at the 2000 Father Bauer Cup and the 2002 Spengler Cup.

Pelino then moved to the National Hockey League (NHL), serving as head coach for the Florida Panthers in 2003-04, before joining the staff of the New York Rangers as an assistant in August 2004. After five years with the Rangers, Pelino spent the 2009-10 season as an assistant coach with the San Antonio Rampage of the American Hockey League (AHL). He then took over as head coach of the OHL’s Peterborough Petes prior to the 2010-11 campaign. He was sacked by the Petes in December 2012.

In May 2013, Pelino put pen to paper on a two-year deal as assistant coach of Metallurg Magnitogorsk of the Kontinental Hockey League (KHL), serving under Mike Keenan. He helped guide Metallurg to the Gagarin Cup as KHL champions his first year and stayed on the job after Keenan was let go in October 2015 and Ilia Vorobiev was promoted from assistant to head coach. In the 2015-16 season, Pelino won the Gagarin Cup with Metallurg for a second time. He inked a contract extension with the club in June 2016, which will keep him in Magnitogorsk until 2018.

In October 2016, he was named to Canada's coaching staff for the Deutschland Cup, serving as an assistant to head coach Dave King.

== Honors and achievements ==
- Ontario University Athletics (West Division) Coach of the Year 1988, 1989, 1995
- Member of the Welland Sports Wall of Fame (inducted in 2013)
- Member of the 1983-84 Varsity Blues’ Men’s Hockey Team, which was inducted into the University of Toronto Hall of Fame in 2014
- Gagarin Cup winner 2014, 2016
