= Jeremy Roenick =

American ice hockey player (born 1970)

- Hockey Hall of Fame, 2024
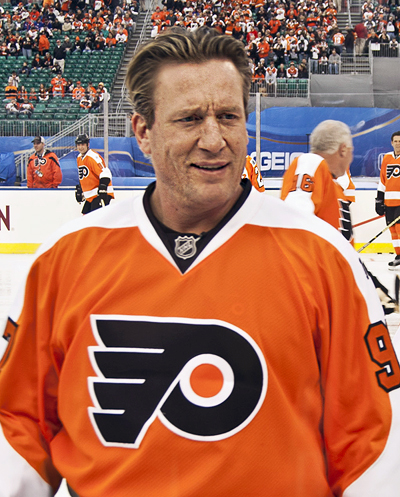
- Roenick in December 2011
- Born: January 17, 1970 (age 56) Boston, Massachusetts, U.S.
- Height: 6 ft 1 in (185 cm)
- Weight: 201 lb (91 kg; 14 st 5 lb)
- Position: Center
- Shot: Right
- Played for: Chicago Blackhawks; Kölner Haie; Phoenix Coyotes; Philadelphia Flyers; Los Angeles Kings; San Jose Sharks
- National team: United States
- NHL draft: 8th overall, 1988; Chicago Blackhawks
- Playing career: 1988–2009
- Website: roenicklife.com

Jeremy Shaffer Roenick (/ˈroʊnɪk/ ROH-nik; born January 17, 1970) is an American former professional ice hockey player who played as a center for 20 seasons in the National Hockey League (NHL) for the Chicago Blackhawks, Phoenix Coyotes, Philadelphia Flyers, Los Angeles Kings and San Jose Sharks.

Roenick excelled in hockey at a young age with Thayer Academy to where he was drafted in 1988 as the eighth overall pick by the Chicago Blackhawks at the age of 18. He spent the majority of the 1988–89 season with the Hull Olympiques of the QMJHL before being called up by Chicago, where he recorded 18 points in 20 games. He recorded the first of thirteen 20-goal seasons in the 1989–90 season before recording four consecutive seasons with at least 40 goals, which included 50 goals in both the 1991–92 and 1992–93 seasons while reaching the Stanley Cup Final for the only time in 1992. Injuries plagued his final two seasons with Chicago before he was traded to the Coyotes in 1996, where he recorded five straight 20-goal seasons before signing as a free agent with the Flyers in 2001, where he subsequently recorded his 1,000th point. A trade to Los Angeles in 2005 saw him later play in Phoenix and his final stop with San Jose in the next few years. In 2007, he became the third American-born player to reach 500 goals and the 40th overall. He retired in 2009, having scored 513 goals and 703 assists in 1,363 games as one of only 24 players at the time with 500 goals and 700 assists in league history.

Roenick also represented Team USA in several international tournaments. After retiring in 2009, Roenick joined NBC Sports as a hockey analyst from 2010 to 2020. Roenick was inducted into the Hockey Hall of Fame in 2024.

== Playing career ==
=== Amateur career ===
Roenick began playing hockey at age four when the parents of a playmate persuaded Roenick's parents to put him in a hockey program so that their child would be with someone he knew. The son of a Mobil oil district coordinator, Roenick constantly moved around the Northeastern United States, joining new hockey teams with each stop. As a youth, Roenick played in the 1982 Quebec International Pee-Wee Hockey Tournament with a minor ice hockey team from Middlesex County, Connecticut, and in the 1983 tournament with the Washington Capitals minor ice hockey team.

Roenick then moved to Fairfax, Virginia, where he traveled to play for the bantam-level New Jersey Rockets, who had won back-to-back national championships in 1984–85 and 1985–86. At age 14, Roenick was required to take a flight from Dulles Airport to Newark, New Jersey, on a weekly basis to make the Rockets' games. Roenick helped the Rockets to a state championship, registering 300 points in only 75 games. After one year of traveling for hockey, the Roenick family would move back to Massachusetts, where he enrolled at Thayer Academy. Roenick played on the same line as future NHL line-mate Tony Amonte; the two went on to win two League Championships.

Roenick was so impressive during his time at Thayer Academy he was drafted straight out of high school, going eighth overall in the 1988 NHL entry draft to the Chicago Blackhawks. He was also taken to breakfast by Wayne Gretzky in an attempt to convince Roenick to play for the Hull Olympiques, a Quebec Major Junior Hockey League (QMJHL) team Gretzky owned. Roenick played for the Olympiques during the 1988–89 season scoring 70 points in 28 games, before going on to represent the United States at the 1989 World Junior Championship. In his second World Junior Championship, Roenick led the tournament in scoring and was named a Tournament All-Star. Roenick's line, which included future NHL players Mike Modano and John LeClair, totaled 41 points, the most ever by a Team USA line and sixth most in tournament history. Despite his scoring success, the United States finished the tournament in fifth place. During the tournament, Roenick become the all-time leading American scorer, totaling 25 points. Roenick's record stood for 21 years before being broken by Jordan Schroeder in 2010. However, it took Schroeder three tournaments to pass Roenick, who set the record in just two events. Following Roenick's successful World Junior performance, the Blackhawks called him up during the 1988–89 season.

=== Chicago Blackhawks (1988–1996) ===
Roenick made his NHL debut on October 6, 1988, against the New York Rangers and then scored his first goal on February 14, 1989, against the Minnesota North Stars. In 20 games at the NHL level, Roenick scored 18 points. In the 1989 Stanley Cup playoffs, he helped the Blackhawks reach the Conference Finals. During the playoffs, Roenick gave the Chicago fans a glimpse of what kind of player he would become. In a game against the St. Louis Blues, Roenick got into an altercation with Blues' defenseman Glen Featherstone. Featherstone crosschecked Roenick in the mouth and broke his front teeth; Featherstone would be given a five-minute major penalty, while Roenick received a minor penalty. Roenick remained in the game and once his penalty expired, he took a shift on the power play and scored a goal.

In the 1989–90 season, Roenick joined the Blackhawks full-time and helped the team improve by 22 points to win the Norris Division title; he scored 26 goals and 66 points in the regular season. During the 1990 playoffs, Roenick helped the Blackhawks reach the Campbell Conference Finals before losing to the Edmonton Oilers. He scored 18 points in 20 games. The Blackhawks' confidence in Roenick's abilities allowed them to trade star forward Denis Savard for defenseman Chris Chelios in June 1990.

In 1990–91, Roenick paced the team with ten game-winning goals as the Blackhawks improved another 18 points to win the Presidents' Trophy. Roenick finished second on the team with 41 goals, 53 assists and 94 points and played in his first NHL All-Star Game. In six playoff games, he scored eight points. The following year, Roenick led the team with 53 goals, 50 assists and 103 points and played in his second All-Star Game. While the team dropped to second in the Norris Division during the regular season, they marched all the way to the 1992 Stanley Cup Final in the playoffs. Roenick scored 22 points in 18 games as the team captured the Clarence S. Campbell Bowl over Edmonton but was held mostly in check in the Final. In Game 2, he failed to get a shot on goal and was benched for the final two periods by head coach Mike Keenan to bring muscle against the Penguin defense, a move Roenick disliked. Before Game 3, Roenick appeared in a cast on his right arm with an apparent broken thumb after being slashed, although Roenick later stated the injury was a bit embellished in an attempt by Keenan to curry favor with the referees, which did not work. Roenick had two goals in the decisive Game 4 in what proved to be his only goals and points recorded in a Stanley Cup Final as the Blackhawks were swept by the Penguins.

In the 1992–93 season, Roenick led the Blackhawks with 50 goals, 107 points and 22 power-play goals as the team improved 19 points to win their third Norris Division title in four years (47 wins, 106 points). During the season, Roenick played in his third All-Star Game. In the playoffs, he scored three points in four games as the Blackhawks were swept by the St. Louis Blues.

In the 1993–94 season, Roenick again led his team with 46 goals, a career-high 61 assists, 107 points, a career-high 24 power-play goals, five shorthanded goals and a +21 plus-minus rating as the Blackhawks fell back 19 points in the standings. He also played in his fourth mid-season All-Star Game. In the post-season, he scored seven points in six playoff games. He also won the Chicago Sports Profiles Humanitarian of the Year Award.

In the lockout-shortened 1994–95 season, Roenick scored 34 points in 33 games. He missed 15 games with a bruised tibia. He played eight games in the 1995 playoffs as the Blackhawks reached the Western Conference Final, where they fell to the Detroit Red Wings. In 1995–96, Roenick scored 67 points in 66 games before missing the last 11 games with a sprained ankle. At year's end, he was the team's leader with 32 goals.

=== Phoenix Coyotes (1996–2001) ===
On August 16, 1996, Roenick was traded to the Phoenix Coyotes in exchange for Alexei Zhamnov, Craig Mills and a first-round draft pick (Ty Jones). As the number 27 he wore in Chicago was already worn by (and would eventually be retired for) Teppo Numminen, Roenick chose number 97, becoming the first player in NHL history to wear number 97. In his first season with his new team, Roenick scored 29 goals and 69 points. In 1997–98, he finished second on the team with 56 points. In 1998–99, he led the Coyotes with 72 points and played in his fifth All-Star Game while also knocking 154 hits. In 1999–2000, Roenick again led the Coyotes in scoring, this time racking up 34 goals and 44 assists for 78 points. He tallied 125 hits on the season and played in his sixth All-Star Game. In 2000–01, Roenick led the Coyotes with 30 goals and 76 points. He played 80 games and registered 133 hits.

=== Philadelphia Flyers (2001–2005) ===
On July 2, 2001, Roenick signed a five-year contract with the Philadelphia Flyers. In his first season with the Flyers, he won both the Bobby Clarke Trophy (MVP) and Yanick Dupre Memorial (Class Guy) team awards. He led the team with 46 assists, 67 points and a +32 plus-minus rating as the Flyers won the Atlantic Division title. On January 30, he scored his 1,000th NHL point in a game against the Ottawa Senators. Three nights later, he played in the mid-season All-Star Game. In the 2002 playoffs, Roenick played five games in an opening-round loss to the Senators.

In 2002–03, Roenick led the Flyers with 27 goals and 59 points as the team won 45 games and finished second in the Atlantic Division. He also co-led the Flyers with 32 assists and eight power-play goals. On November 16, Roenick played in his 1,000th NHL game. In February, he played in the mid-season All-Star Game. In the 2003 playoffs, he scored eight points in 13 games as the Flyers reached the second round before again losing to the Ottawa Senators.

On February 12, 2004, during a game against the New York Rangers, Roenick was hit in the face by an errant slapshot from the Rangers' defenseman Boris Mironov. The force of the shot broke Roenick's jaw in 19 places and knocked him unconscious for several minutes as he lay on the ice in a pool of blood. Roenick suffered his ninth concussion on the play, and there was concern that he had suffered damage to his brain's circulatory system, in addition to the broken jaw, leading him to consider retirement. However, further testing revealed no circulatory damage and Roenick returned ahead of schedule, after missing more than a month of hockey due to the concussion and broken jaw, with less than two weeks left in the season. In 2003–04, Roenick was limited to 62 games, but still scored 47 points as the Flyers won their third division title in five years. He finished second on the team with a .76 points-per-game average. In the 2004 playoffs, Roenick helped the Flyers reach the Eastern Conference Finals, scoring four goals and 13 points, including the series-clinching overtime goal in game six of the second round series against the Toronto Maple Leafs. The Flyers, however, lost in the Eastern Conference Finals to the eventual Stanley Cup champions, the Tampa Bay Lightning.

=== Los Angeles Kings (2005–2006) ===
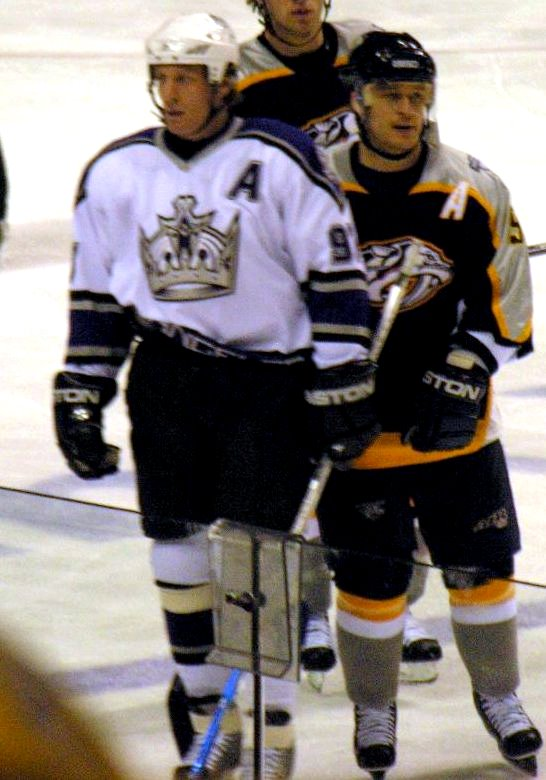
Roenick with the Kings (left) next to Paul Kariya

Following the NHL Lockout, the Flyers surprised everyone by signing Peter Forsberg on August 3, 2005. In order to clear salary cap space for Forsberg's contract, Roenick was traded the next day to the Los Angeles Kings.

Roenick's 2005–06 season with the Kings was greatly disappointing, both for Roenick and for the team. He managed just 22 points in 58 games, his lowest total since he scored 18 points in 20 games in his rookie season. It was a trying season for Roenick, who missed time due to a broken finger suffered while blocking a shot during a penalty kill, played games late in the season after suffering a chip fracture in his right ankle and, the concussion suffered from the slapshot had changed Roenick's game making him a tentative player. Roenick was displeased with his performances stating in an almost apologetic way: "I went to LA to finish off the last year of my contract and had a year off playing [lockout] and it was a really difficult year for me, it was hard mentally. A lot of people don't realize that for six months I had a lot of problems with the concussions and battling the jaw injury…"

Becoming a free agent at the end of his first season in Los Angeles, he expressed strong interest in joining a Canadian team. "It was a nightmare season from hell last year," Roenick said, "I've always said I would like to play in Canada before my career is over."

=== Return to Phoenix Coyotes (2006–2007) ===
Instead, Roenick signed a one-year, $1.2 million contract, on July 4, 2006, that brought him back to the Phoenix Coyotes. In Phoenix for his second tenure, he scored 28 points in 70 games, a relatively low scoring season for him. His second stint in Phoenix was not without its share of off-ice issues as well. On December 12, 2006, Roenick left General Motors Place in Vancouver after finding out he had been scratched from the game's line-up against the Vancouver Canucks. Roenick went on record saying he left the arena to go to a restaurant for what he called "a nice dinner." At the heart of the problem was that Roenick felt that he was healthy enough to play in the game following a back injury, while Coyotes head coach Wayne Gretzky felt he needed more time to recover. Roenick's antics led to him being benched again in the Coyotes' next game. The next time Roenick was scratched, he was more accepting of Gretzky's decision, stating a different mindset following the news that his daughter, Brandi, had been diagnosed with the kidney ailment IgA nephropathy.

=== San Jose Sharks (2007–2009) ===
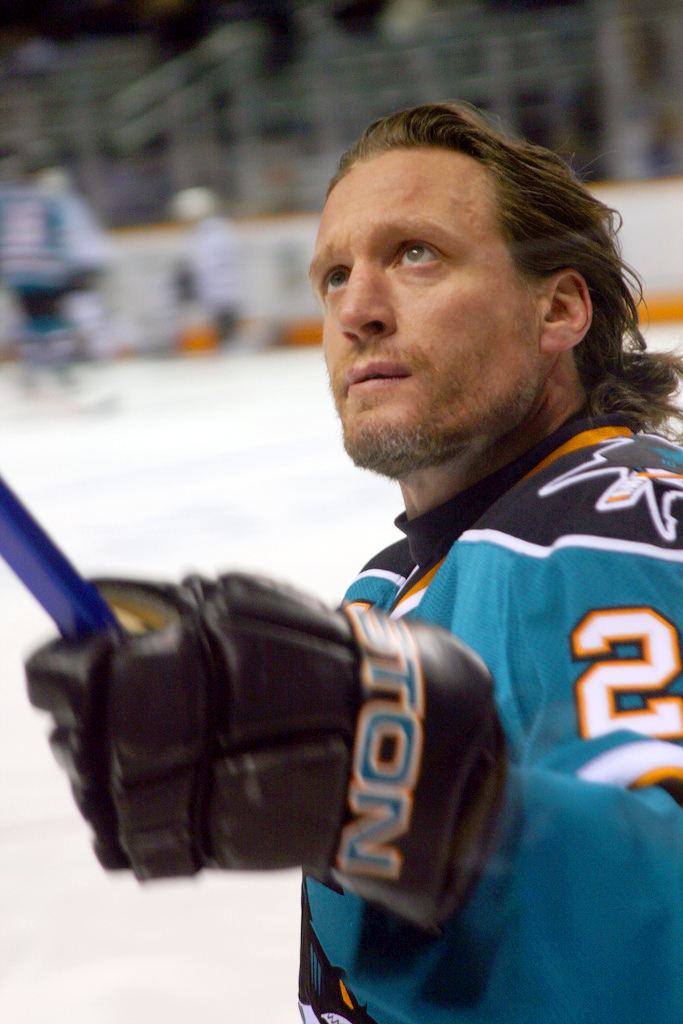
Roenick with the Sharks in April 2008

After his low-scoring campaign in Phoenix, there was speculation Roenick would retire. Indeed, on July 4, 2007, The Philadelphia Inquirer reported Roenick sent them a text message announcing his retirement from the NHL. However, later that month, Roenick's agent, Neil Abbott, released a statement indicating the "text message retirement" announcement by the Philadelphia newspaper had been premature, and that Roenick would be making a decision on his future within the next month.

On September 4, 2007, it was confirmed Roenick had signed a one-year, $500,000 contract with the San Jose Sharks to fill the role of checking line center. Roenick credited Sharks' general manager Doug Wilson, his former roommate when they played together in Chicago, with giving him another chance at hockey; he stated that Wilson gave him three requirements: play for the league minimum, no talking to the media unless asked and no alcohol.

One month into his first season with San Jose, on November 10, Roenick scored his 500th goal, coming against his former team, the Phoenix Coyotes – an unassisted mark from center ice that bounced off the end boards, then hitting the side of the net. Goaltender Alex Auld attempted to clear the puck out of the crease from the side of the goal mouth, but accidentally bumped the puck off the heel of his goalie stick into the net. Roenick became the third American-born player to reach the 500-goal plateau, joining Mike Modano and Joe Mullen. On January 10, 2008, Roenick scored his 503rd goal, against the Vancouver Canucks, passing Joe Mullen for second in all-time scoring by American-born players. As the Sharks entered the 2008 playoffs against the Calgary Flames, Roenick displayed an inspired Game 7 performance, scoring two goals and two assists to eliminate Calgary. However, after advancing to the second round to face Mike Modano and the Dallas Stars in the second round, the Sharks were eliminated in six games. Roenick also finished the season with ten game-winning goals.

On June 25, 2008, Roenick re-signed with the Sharks to a one-year, $1.1 million contract, doubling his previous year's salary.

On February 21, 2009, Roenick recorded his 700th career assist, against the Atlanta Thrashers, by setting up a goal by Jonathan Cheechoo. He is the 48th player in NHL history, and the sixth American-born player, to reach that threshold. He was also only the 24th player with 500 goals and 700 assists in NHL history.

=== Retirement ===
On August 6, 2009, Roenick announced his retirement from the NHL and professional hockey. Roenick finished his career having scored 513 goals and 703 assists in 1,363 games for a total of 1,216 points. He was inducted into the Hockey Hall of Fame on November 11, 2024.

== Personality ==
Roenick was known for giving back to the fans. Whether it was signing autographs for fans by the players entrance or who came up to him on the street, Roenick regularly attempted to establish good rapport with the fans. For Roenick, it was an understanding of what it meant to be the fan on the other side. As a child, he attended Hartford Whalers' games; during one visit, hockey legend Gordie Howe picked up a pile of snow off the ice and threw it over the glass and on top of Roenick's head; Howe then continued to skate around but looked at Roenick again and winked. Roenick recalled what a lasting effect it had on him, noting, "I thought that was the coolest thing that ever happened in my whole life, it took three seconds. It was me, Gordie Howe and no one else...That moment stuck with me for years and years and years. It was little, it was small and it took nothing out of his power or time but it resonated with me my whole life. So, as a player, as I got older, I tried to reach out to fans, reach out to kids whether on the ice or on the street or in a restaurant. I try to do little things where I can make the same impression on a young child that Gordie Howe made on me. That's a gift that was given to me. And I made sure I did it, every, single day. Without the fans, without their support, the NHL would be nothing, the NFL would be nothing, basketball, baseball, you name it right down the line ... The two or three seconds you give each day to make sure you appreciate the people who appreciate you, goes a long way."

It was Roenick's willingness to talk that got him into a famous trade of quotations in 1996. In the 1996 Western Conference Semi-finals between the Colorado Avalanche and the Chicago Blackhawks, after a controversial game in which Roenick was tripped on a breakaway and no penalty shot was called, Patrick Roy said, "I would have saved it anyway." Roenick responded in another interview, "I'd like to know where Patrick was in Game 3 (a game in which Roenick had scored on Patrick Roy on a similar breakaway); probably up trying to get his jock out of the rafters." When later asked about Roenick's comments Roy retorted, "I cannot really hear what Jeremy says because I've got my two Stanley Cup rings plugging my ears."

=== Controversies ===
Roenick's openness has often led to controversy. During the 2004–05 NHL lockout, he addressed certain fans that perceive NHL players as being spoiled. Roenick told these fans to "kiss my ass" and accused them of being jealous. He stated further he would prefer that those fans who shared that perception no longer attend NHL games or watch them on television. Afterwards, Roenick felt his remarks had been taken out of context by ESPN.

Following the loss of the 2004–05 season to a labor dispute, Roenick found himself at odds with the Philadelphia Flyers. He claimed to be suffering from a concussion despite the Flyers' doctors having cleared him following his exit physical. Under the terms of the NHL collective bargaining agreement, injured players from the previous season were still to be paid during the lockout (Roenick's contract was for $7.5 million in 2004–05). After several trips to different doctors the Flyers and Roenick finally settled on a payment between $1.09 million and $1.5 million for games he would have missed due to post-concussion syndrome if there had been no lockout.

Roenick was suspended for one game during the 2003–04 season for throwing a water bottle at an official.

Roenick's penchant for stirring controversy also saw him claiming in 2006 that USA Hockey has "blackballed" him, and was being disrespectful by not including him on the American national team at the 2006 Winter Olympics in Turin. He claimed, "I'm a lot better player than my points indicate"; he had 6 goals and 7 assists in 32 games when he made that comment.

In May 2009, Roenick claimed Chris Chelios, then a member of the Detroit Red Wings, was receiving less playing time because Mike Babcock, Detroit's head coach, was biased against American players. Chelios and Babcock dismissed the allegations, stating there was no tension between them.

Roenick returned to questioning American Olympic selections prior to the 2010 Winter Olympics in Vancouver. During an interview with Toronto-based radio station AM640, Roenick publicly questioned the selection of Chris Drury to the Olympic team. Roenick felt Drury was not as good for the team as Scott Gomez or T. J. Oshie (who were not selected) in terms of on-ice play. Roenick also felt Drury's main role was to be a leader to the young Americans and that Mike Modano was a better choice to fill that role for the Olympic team. Drury scored a key goal for the team in the U.S.' win over Canada during the preliminary round, and Roenick later issued a public apology to Drury.

On February 8, 2006, The Star Ledger reported Roenick had been identified as one of several NHL players implicated in Operation Slapshot – an operation created with the intent to uncover a nationwide gambling ring. Other notable names involved in this investigation are former Phoenix Coyotes assistant coach and former Tampa Bay Lightning head coach Rick Tocchet, and the wife of Wayne Gretzky, Janet Jones. Roenick was required to provide an affidavit to the New Jersey authorities for allegedly placing bets. It was the second time Roenick had been investigated for his gambling. In 2004, Roenick came under investigation after paying a Florida sports-gambling operation between $50,000 and $100,000 for betting tips and services. However, at the time, the NHL did not prohibit players from betting on sports, other than hockey, and Roenick stated he stopped gambling after a warning from Philadelphia Flyers general manager Bobby Clarke.

On January 25, 2017, Roenick was arrested in New York after police discovered he was driving with a suspended license during a routine traffic stop. Roenick claimed New York's Department of Motor Vehicles (DMV) was sending mail to an address he had not lived at since 1989. He commented on the experience stating, "I'm out $750. Not only my time. Plus I got arrested. Plus I sat in a jail cell with cokeheads. Plus I sat in the courtroom with real criminals. I've never been arrested before in my life!"

On December 23, 2019, NBC suspended Roenick indefinitely for making inappropriate comments about coworkers Kathryn Tappen, Patrick Sharp, and Anson Carter during an interview on the Spittin' Chiclets podcast. The comments included joking about having a threesome with Tappen. NBC fired Roenick after his suspension ended in February 2020.

In July 2020, Roenick filed a lawsuit against NBC Sports for wrongful termination, arguing that he was discriminated against as a straight, white man and as a supporter of President Donald Trump. The lawsuit alleged that NBC Sports had committed a contractual breach by firing him without a proper cause and by not providing Roenick a reasonable opportunity to address the incident.

== Media ==
On April 11, 2007, Roenick made his debut as a Stanley Cup playoffs hockey analyst on TSN, a cable sports broadcast network in Canada. In 2007, Roenick also co-hosted two episodes of The Best Damn Sports Show...Period which aired on Fox Sports Net, it is unclear if this role would have become a permanent role had Roenick not signed with the San Jose Sharks.

In October 2009, TSN's Off the Record announced an agreement that has Roenick appearing on the show as a regular contributor. Roenick's recurring segment has been named "Oh JR! with Jeremy Roenick."

Roenick joined NBC Sports Group in 2010 and serves as a studio analyst for NBC Sports Group's NHL coverage on NHL Live and NHL Overtime, NBCSN's pre- and post-game shows alongside studio host Kathryn Tappen. In addition to his regular role on NHL Live, Roenick has served as a men's and women's Olympic hockey analyst at the past three Winter Olympics. As an analyst for the NBC family of networks coverage of the 2010 Winter Olympics, in Vancouver, he acted as the counterpart for Mike Milbury. In the post-game show of the Canada–Russia quarterfinal, Milbury said Russia brought their "Eurotrash game." Co-host Bill Patrick asked Milbury, "Did you really say 'Eurotrash'? Did that come out of your mouth?" Roenick's face showed his surprise as he said, "I heard it. I heard it."

Roenick was also an analyst for NBC during the 2010 Stanley Cup Final, where, after his two former teams the Chicago Blackhawks and Philadelphia Flyers battled for the Stanley Cup, he became overwhelmed emotionally, barely holding back tears and addressing the victorious Blackhawks organization and their fans by saying, "For the kid who was there in 1992 who was crying when I came off the ice in after we lost Game 4 at Chicago Stadium—you waited 18 years. I hope you have a big smile on your face. Congratulations." When pressed further about his emotional state, Roenick appeared to have trouble putting his emotions into words and simply replied, "I'm proud, I'm happy. I'm proud."

In September 2010, it was announced Roenick would become a regular judge on the second season of CBC's reality program Battle of the Blades, which pairs ex-NHL players with professional female figure skaters to compete in a pairs figure skating competition.

Roenick also gained pop culture notoriety when Vince Vaughn referenced him in the 1996 film Swingers. While Vaughn's character plays a hockey video game in the movie, he says to his opponent, "Y'know, it's not so much me as Roenick; he's good ...". IGN would rank Roenick as the fourth-greatest athlete in video game history in 2012. When asked about if he had ever talked to Vaughn about the line in the film, Roenick said, "Yeah, he was actually a big fan of mine because he used to watch the games. He told me he put me in that movie totally out of respect. And everything he does, he tries to involve me with it. In Wedding Crashers, his fake name was Jeremy in the movie. That was pretty cool. He's a big fan of mine and a great dude. Great guy."

Roenick has made acting appearances on television shows as well, including a cameo appearance on an episode of Go On on NBC on September 25, 2012. He has also appeared in an episode of Leverage, an episode of Ghost Whisperer, two episodes of Hack and two episodes of HBO's Arliss. In 2016, Roenick made a guest appearance in the penultimate season of the Fox crime drama Bones, in the episode "The Head in the Abutment."

== Personal life ==
While with the Philadelphia Flyers, Roenick lived in Moorestown, New Jersey.

Roenick and his wife Tracy have two children: daughter Brandi and son Brett. They live in Scottsdale, Arizona. Tracy Roenick is an avid equestrienne rider, owner and trainer who earned a spot on the United States Equestrian Team Long List in 2001.

Roenick is a Republican. In 2016, he voiced his support for presidential candidate Donald Trump in an interview with Philadelphia radio station WIP-FM, though he said he had initially supported Florida senator Marco Rubio's campaign.

Roenick's nephew, Chris Calnan, was selected 79th overall by the Chicago Blackhawks in the 2012 NHL entry draft.

== Awards and achievements ==
Medal record

Representing United States

Ice hockey

Winter Olympics
Silver medal – second place	2002 Salt Lake City	

Award	Year
Junior
QMJHL Second All-Star Team	1989
NHL
All-Star Game	1991, 1992, 1993, 1994, 1999, 2000, 2002, 2003, 2004
International
Media All-Star Team	1989
Canada Cup All-Star Team	1991

== Career statistics ==
=== Regular season and playoffs ===
			Regular season					Playoffs
Season	Team	League	GP	G	A	Pts	PIM	GP	G	A	Pts	PIM
1986–87	Thayer Academy	HS-Prep	24	21	34	55	20	—	—	—	—	—
1987–88	Thayer Academy	HS-Prep	24	34	50	84	38	—	—	—	—	—
1988–89	Hull Olympiques	QMJHL	28	34	36	70	14	9	7	12	19	6
1988–89	Chicago Blackhawks	NHL	20	9	9	18	4	10	1	3	4	7
1989–90	Chicago Blackhawks	NHL	78	26	40	66	54	20	11	7	18	8
1990–91	Chicago Blackhawks	NHL	79	41	53	94	80	6	3	5	8	4
1991–92	Chicago Blackhawks	NHL	80	53	50	103	98	18	12	10	22	12
1992–93	Chicago Blackhawks	NHL	84	50	57	107	86	4	1	2	3	2
1993–94	Chicago Blackhawks	NHL	84	46	61	107	125	6	1	6	7	2
1994–95	Kölner Haie	DEL	3	3	1	4	2	—	—	—	—	—
1994–95	Chicago Blackhawks	NHL	33	10	24	34	14	8	1	2	3	16
1995–96	Chicago Blackhawks	NHL	66	32	35	67	109	10	5	7	12	2
1996–97	Phoenix Coyotes	NHL	72	29	40	69	115	6	2	4	6	4
1997–98	Phoenix Coyotes	NHL	79	24	32	56	103	6	5	3	8	4
1998–99	Phoenix Coyotes	NHL	78	24	48	72	130	1	0	0	0	0
1999–00	Phoenix Coyotes	NHL	75	34	44	78	102	5	2	2	4	10
2000–01	Phoenix Coyotes	NHL	80	30	46	76	114	—	—	—	—	—
2001–02	Philadelphia Flyers	NHL	75	21	46	67	74	5	0	0	0	14
2002–03	Philadelphia Flyers	NHL	79	27	32	59	75	13	3	5	8	8
2003–04	Philadelphia Flyers	NHL	62	19	28	47	62	18	4	9	13	8
2005–06	Los Angeles Kings	NHL	58	9	13	22	36	—	—	—	—	—
2006–07	Phoenix Coyotes	NHL	70	11	17	28	32	—	—	—	—	—
2007–08	San Jose Sharks	NHL	69	14	19	33	26	12	2	3	5	2
2008–09	San Jose Sharks	NHL	42	4	9	13	24	6	0	1	1	12
NHL totals			1,363	513	703	1,216	1,463	154	53	69	122	115

=== International ===
Year	Team	Event	GP	G	A	Pts	PIM
1988	United States	WJC	7	5	4	9	4
1989	United States	WJC	7	8	8	16	0
1991	United States	WC	9	5	6	11	8
1991	United States	CC	8	4	2	6	4
1998	United States	OLY	4	0	1	1	6
2002	United States	OLY	6	1	4	5	2
Junior totals			14	13	12	25	4
Senior totals			27	10	13	23	20

== See also ==
- List of NHL players with 1,000 games played
- List of NHL players with 1,000 points
- List of NHL players with 500 goals
- List of NHL players with 50 goal seasons
- List of NHL players with 100 point seasons

Awards and achievements
Preceded by Jimmy Waite	Chicago Blackhawks first-round draft pick 1988	Succeeded by Adam Bennett
Preceded by Roman Čechmánek	Winner of the Bobby Clarke Trophy; 2002	Succeeded by Roman Čechmánek
