= Ransford Koufie =

Ghanaian footballer

Personal information
- Date of birth: 21 August 2002 (age 24)
- Place of birth: Accra, Ghana
- Position: Midfielder

Team information
- Current team: Golden Kick

Youth career
- 2018–2020: Golden Kick

Senior career*
| Years | Team | Apps | (Gls) |
| 2020– | Golden Kick | 0 | (0) |
| 2020 | → King Faisal Babes (loan) | 5 | (0) |

International career
| 2018 | Ghana U17 | | |
- * Club domestic league appearances and goals as of 17:44, 12 April 2020 (UTC)

Ransford Koufie (born 21 August 2002) is a Ghanaian footballer who currently plays as a midfielder for Golden Kick.

== Career statistics ==
=== Club ===
As of 14 July 2020.

| Club | Season | League | | | Cup | | Continental | | Other | | Total | |
| Club | Season | Division | Apps | Goals | Apps | Goals | Apps | Goals | Apps | Goals | Apps | Goals |
|---|---|---|---|---|---|---|---|---|---|---|---|---|
| King Faisal Babes (loan) | 2019–20 | Ghana Premier League | 5 | 0 | 0 | 0 | – | | 0 | 0 | 5 | 0 |
| Career total | | | 5 | 0 | 0 | 0 | 0 | 0 | 0 | 0 | 5 | 0 |
