= Bill Ranford =

Canadian ice hockey goaltender (born 1966)

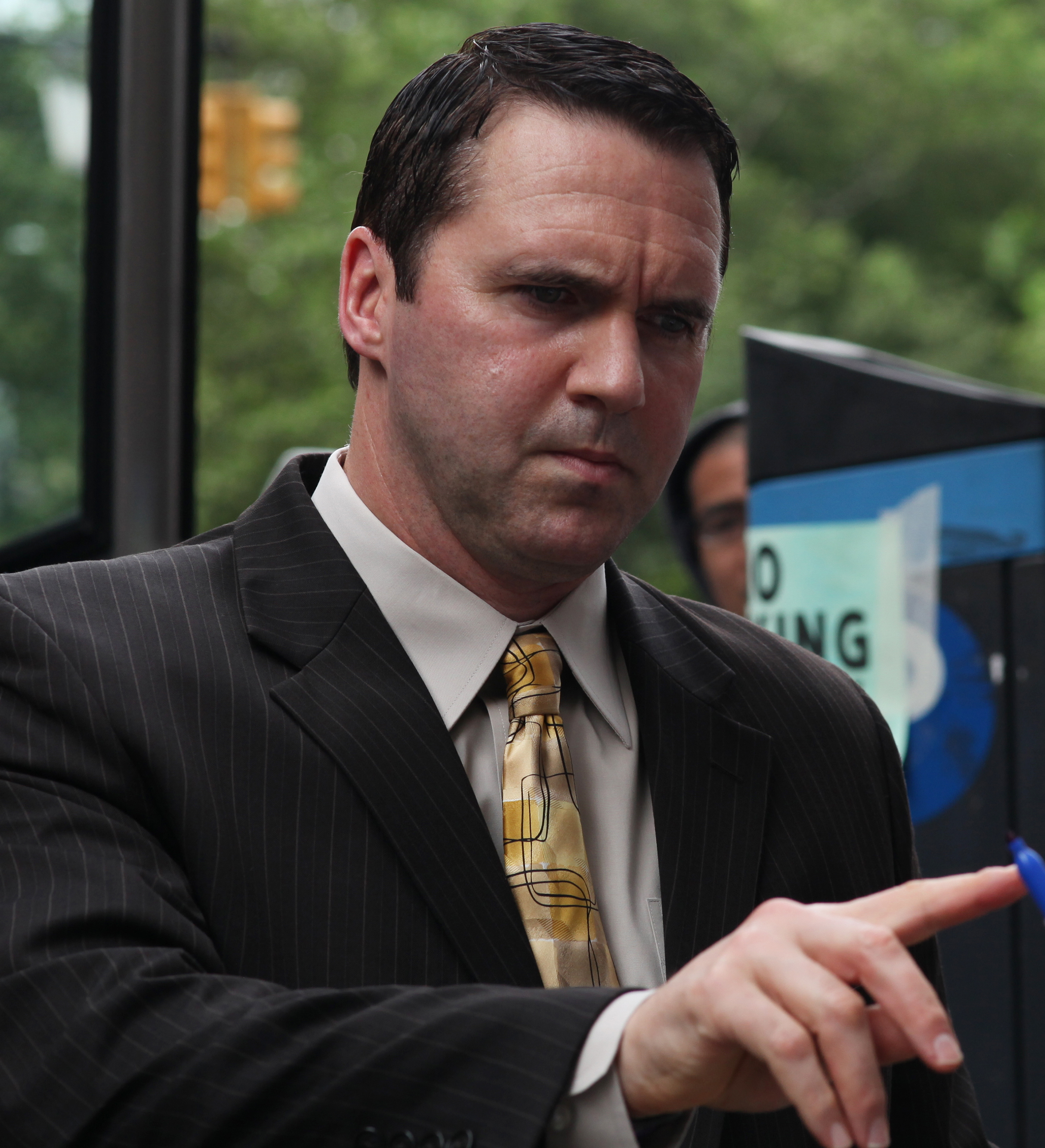
- Ranford in 2014
- Born: December 14, 1966 (age 59) Brandon, Manitoba, Canada
- Height: 5 ft 11 in (180 cm)
- Weight: 185 lb (84 kg; 13 st 3 lb)
- Position: Goaltender
- Caught: Left
- Played for: Boston Bruins; Edmonton Oilers; Washington Capitals; Tampa Bay Lightning; Detroit Red Wings
- National team: Canada
- NHL draft: 52nd overall, 1985; Boston Bruins
- Playing career: 1985–2000

William Edward Ranford (born December 14, 1966) is a Canadian former professional ice hockey goaltender and current director of goaltending for the Los Angeles Kings. He was selected in the third round of the 1985 NHL entry draft, 52nd overall, by the Boston Bruins. Over the course of fifteen NHL seasons Ranford played with Boston, the Edmonton Oilers, Washington Capitals, Tampa Bay Lightning, and Detroit Red Wings, winning two Stanley Cups, a Canada Cup, and the 1994 Men's Ice Hockey World Championships while playing for Canada. He is the only goaltender in history to be awarded the MVP of the Stanley Cup Playoffs, Canada Cup/World Cup, & Men's Ice Hockey World Championship.

== Early life and career ==
Ranford was born in Brandon, Manitoba but because his father was in the Canadian Armed Forces, he grew up in various places across Canada and even lived in Germany for a few years. As a child, he took figure skating lessons before eventually deciding to go into goaltending. He played for local teams in Portage la Prairie, Manitoba, Prince Edward Island and Red Deer, Alberta.

He attended New Westminster Secondary School while playing for the Western Hockey League's New Westminster Bruins, graduating in 1985. That same month, he was drafted by Boston in the 3rd round (52nd overall) in the 1985 NHL Entry Draft, that was held on June 15, 1985. Ranford's post-draft year, 1985–86, was an eventful one as he was named to the WHL Second All-Star Team and saw his first NHL action after the WHL season ended, winning three of four games for Boston, before going 0–2 in the playoffs.

To start the next year Boston assigned him to the Moncton Golden Flames of the AHL where he went 3–0 to start the season and wound up spending the rest of the year with Boston. The replacement of Bruins coach Butch Goring with Terry O'Reilly led to Ranford falling out of favour and eventually being dealt on March 8, 1988 from the Boston Bruins with Geoff Courtnall to the Edmonton Oilers in exchange for Andy Moog.

Prior to the trade he had spent most of the 1987–88 season with the AHL's Maine Mariners but that was the last time he played at the minor-league level.

== NHL career ==
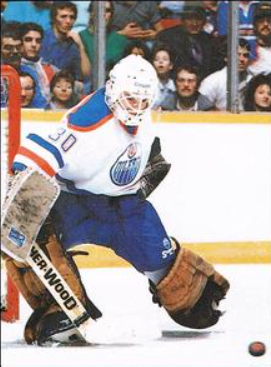
1988 photo of Ranford for Edmonton Oilers

Ranford won his first Stanley Cup in 1988 as the backup to Grant Fuhr. In 1990 and with constant comparisons to the injured Fuhr, Ranford emerged as a first-rate goaltender, leading the Oilers to the Stanley Cup and winning the Conn Smythe Trophy (playoff MVP) in the process. It was the last Cup that the Edmonton Oilers dynasty won. Ranford went on to play the next six seasons in Edmonton before being dealt back to the Boston Bruins on January 11, 1996 for Mariusz Czerkawski, Sean Brown, and a first round pick in the 1996 Entry Draft (Matthieu Descoteaux).

After fewer than two seasons with Boston, Ranford was dealt to the Washington Capitals on March 1, 1997 with Adam Oates and Rick Tocchet for Jason Allison, Anson Carter, Jim Carey, a conditional draft pick in the 1998 Entry Draft, and a third round pick in the 1997 Entry Draft (Lee Goren).

Ranford was initially the starting goaltender for Washington but was injured in the opening game of the 1997–98 season and missed a significant portion of the season. When he returned, Olaf Kölzig had taken over the starting position. The Capitals advanced to the Stanley Cup Final that year; it was Ranford's third trip to the Finals, though Kolzig played every minute of the playoffs. On June 18, 1998, he was dealt to the Tampa Bay Lightning for a second round pick in the 1999 Entry Draft and a third round pick in the 1998 Entry Draft (Todd Hornung).

He began the season with Tampa Bay but was traded to the Detroit Red Wings on March 23, 1999 for a conditional draft pick. It was the second deal between the two teams that day. The prior trade brought Wendel Clark and a draft pick to the Red Wings and goaltender Kevin Hodson and a draft pick to the Lightning. The Wendel Clark trade allowed the Ranford deal to go through. Ranford saw his final playoff action that spring, appearing in four games in the second round while starter Chris Osgood was injured. Ranford went 2–2 and recorded his 4th career playoff shutout.

His final year in the NHL was 1999–2000, where Ranford returned to Edmonton as a free agent on August 4, 1999, backing up Tommy Salo before announcing his retirement on April 24, 2000.

== International career ==
Medal record

Representing Canada

World Championships
| Gold medal – first place | 1994 Milan | |

Canada Cup
| Gold medal – first place | 1991 Canada | |

Ranford represented Canada on a few occasions in his career. He was the starting goaltender in the 1991 Canada Cup and went undefeated, playing in all seven of his team's games. He was named to the tournament all-star team.

In 1994 he was Canada's starting goaltender at the World Championships, backstopping Canada to its first gold medal since 1961. After stopping the last Finnish shooter, Mika Nieminen, in the decisive shootout in the gold medal game, Ranford jumped into the air and was mobbed by his teammates.

He was chosen to play for Canada a third time in 1996 at the 1996 World Cup of Hockey, but this time he was the third-stringer behind Curtis Joseph and Martin Brodeur, and didn't play in any games.

== Post-NHL career ==
Ranford played net for the Edmonton Oilers alumni team at the 2003 Heritage Classic, the first outdoor regular-season game in NHL history. Ranford (14 saves) and Grant Fuhr (11 saves) took turns in goal and held the Montreal Canadiens alumni team scoreless in a 2–0 victory.

Ranford acted in the 2004 movie Miracle, performing the on-ice scenes behind the mask as the goaltender for Team USA, Jim Craig, because he had the same stand-up style as Craig.

Ranford served as the goalie coach for the WHL Vancouver Giants for the 2004–2005 and 2005–2006 seasons. On July 10, 2006, he was named the goaltending coach of the Los Angeles Kings. In May 2023 Ranford was named Kings Director of Goaltending. His name was etched onto the Stanley Cup a third time in 2012, and a fourth time in 2014.

He is also a part-owner of the Coquitlam Express of the British Columbia Hockey League (Tier II Junior). The Bill Ranford Trophy is awarded to the top goaltender in Alberta Midget AAA hockey.

== Personal life ==
Ranford is the uncle of professional ice hockey player Brendan Ranford. He is married to Kelly, and has two daughters, Cassady and Tristan.

== Career statistics ==
=== Regular season and playoffs ===
| | | | Regular season | | | | | | | | | Playoffs |
| Season | Team | League | GP | W | L | T | MIN | GA | SO | GAA | SV% | GP | W | L | MIN | GA | SO | GAA | SV% |
|---|---|---|---|---|---|---|---|---|---|---|---|---|---|---|---|---|---|---|---|
| 1983–84 | New Westminster Bruins | WHL | 27 | 10 | 14 | 0 | 1450 | 130 | 0 | 5.38 | .876 | 1 | 0 | 0 | 27 | 2 | 0 | 4.44 | — |
| 1984–85 | New Westminster Bruins | WHL | 38 | 19 | 17 | 0 | 2034 | 142 | 0 | 4.19 | — | 7 | 2 | 3 | 309 | 26 | 0 | 5.05 | — |
| 1985–86 | New Westminster Bruins | WHL | 53 | 17 | 29 | 1 | 2791 | 225 | 1 | 4.84 | — | — | — | — | — | — | — | — | — |
| 1985–86 | Boston Bruins | NHL | 4 | 3 | 1 | 0 | 240 | 10 | 0 | 2.50 | .906 | 2 | 0 | 2 | 120 | 7 | 0 | 3.50 | .841 |
| 1986–87 | Moncton Golden Flames | AHL | 3 | 3 | 0 | 0 | 180 | 6 | 0 | 2.00 | .927 | — | — | — | — | — | — | — | — |
| 1986–87 | Boston Bruins | NHL | 41 | 16 | 20 | 2 | 2234 | 124 | 3 | 3.33 | .891 | 2 | 0 | 2 | 123 | 8 | 0 | 3.90 | .855 |
| 1987–88 | Maine Mariners | AHL | 51 | 27 | 16 | 6 | 2856 | 165 | 1 | 3.47 | .887 | — | — | — | — | — | — | — | — |
| 1987–88 | Edmonton Oilers | NHL | 6 | 3 | 0 | 2 | 325 | 16 | 0 | 2.95 | .899 | — | — | — | — | — | — | — | — |
| 1988–89 | Edmonton Oilers | NHL | 29 | 15 | 8 | 2 | 1509 | 88 | 1 | 3.50 | .877 | — | — | — | — | — | — | — | — |
| 1989–90 | Edmonton Oilers | NHL | 56 | 24 | 16 | 9 | 3107 | 165 | 1 | 3.19 | .887 | 22 | 16 | 6 | 1401 | 59 | 1 | 2.53 | .912 |
| 1990–91 | Edmonton Oilers | NHL | 60 | 27 | 27 | 3 | 3415 | 182 | 0 | 3.20 | .893 | 3 | 1 | 2 | 135 | 8 | 0 | 3.56 | .897 |
| 1991–92 | Edmonton Oilers | NHL | 67 | 27 | 26 | 10 | 3822 | 228 | 1 | 3.58 | .884 | 16 | 8 | 8 | 909 | 51 | 2 | 3.37 | .895 |
| 1992–93 | Edmonton Oilers | NHL | 67 | 17 | 38 | 6 | 3753 | 240 | 1 | 3.84 | .884 | — | — | — | — | — | — | — | — |
| 1993–94 | Edmonton Oilers | NHL | 71 | 22 | 34 | 11 | 4070 | 236 | 1 | 3.48 | .898 | — | — | — | — | — | — | — | — |
| 1994–95 | Edmonton Oilers | NHL | 40 | 15 | 20 | 3 | 2203 | 133 | 2 | 3.62 | .883 | — | — | — | — | — | — | — | — |
| 1995–96 | Edmonton Oilers | NHL | 37 | 13 | 18 | 5 | 2015 | 128 | 1 | 3.81 | .875 | — | — | — | — | — | — | — | — |
| 1995–96 | Boston Bruins | NHL | 40 | 21 | 12 | 4 | 2306 | 109 | 1 | 2.84 | .894 | 4 | 1 | 3 | 239 | 16 | 0 | 4.02 | .857 |
| 1996–97 | Boston Bruins | NHL | 37 | 12 | 16 | 8 | 2147 | 125 | 2 | 3.49 | .887 | — | — | — | — | — | — | — | — |
| 1996–97 | Washington Capitals | NHL | 18 | 8 | 7 | 2 | 1009 | 46 | 0 | 2.74 | .888 | — | — | — | — | — | — | — | — |
| 1997–98 | Washington Capitals | NHL | 22 | 7 | 12 | 2 | 1183 | 46 | 0 | 2.79 | .901 | — | — | — | — | — | — | — | — |
| 1998–99 | Tampa Bay Lightning | NHL | 32 | 3 | 18 | 3 | 1568 | 102 | 1 | 3.90 | .881 | — | — | — | — | — | — | — | — |
| 1998–99 | Detroit Red Wings | NHL | 4 | 3 | 0 | 1 | 244 | 8 | 0 | 1.97 | .918 | 4 | 2 | 2 | 183 | 10 | 1 | 3.28 | .905 |
| 1999–00 | Edmonton Oilers | NHL | 16 | 4 | 6 | 3 | 785 | 47 | 0 | 3.59 | .885 | — | — | — | — | — | — | — | — |
| NHL totals | | | 647 | 240 | 279 | 76 | 35,936 | 2042 | 15 | 3.41 | .888 | 53 | 28 | 25 | 3110 | 159 | 4 | 3.07 | .897 |

=== International ===
| Year | Team | Event | GP | W | L | T | MIN | GA | SO | GAA |
|---|---|---|---|---|---|---|---|---|---|---|
| 1991 | Canada | CC | 8 | 6 | 0 | 2 | 480 | 14 | 1 | 1.75 |
| 1993 | Canada | WC | 6 | 5 | 1 | 0 | 354 | 11 | 2 | 1.86 |
| 1994 | Canada | WC | 6 | 6 | 0 | 0 | 360 | 7 | 1 | 1.17 |
| Senior totals | | | 20 | 17 | 1 | 2 | 1194 | 32 | 4 | 1.61 |

== Awards ==
- 1986 – WHL West Second All-Star Team
- 1988, 1990 – Stanley Cup champion
- 1990 – Conn Smythe Trophy MVP
- 1991 – National Hockey League All-Star Game
- 1991 – Canada Cup (Team Canada)
- 1991 – Canada Cup MVP
- 1994 – Ice Hockey World Championships (Team Canada)
- 1994 – Ice Hockey World Championships MVP
- 2012, 2014 – Stanley Cup champion (as goaltending coach)

== Transactions ==
- June 15, 1985 – Ranford drafted by Boston
- March 8, 1988 – Ranford traded from Boston to Edmonton, along with Geoff Courtnall in exchange for Andy Moog
- January 11, 1996 – Ranford traded from Edmonton to Boston in exchange for Sean Brown, Mariusz Czerkawski and a 1st round draft pick (Matthieu Descoteaux)
- March 1, 1997 – Ranford traded from Boston to Washington, along with Adam Oates and Rick Tocchet in exchange for Jason Allison, Anson Carter, and Jim Carey
- June 18, 1998 – Ranford traded from Washington to Tampa Bay in exchange for a 2nd and 3rd round draft pick (Todd Hornung)
- March 23, 1999 – Ranford traded from Tampa Bay to Detroit in exchange for a conditional draft pick.
- August 4, 1999 – Ranford signs with Edmonton.

| Preceded by Al MacInnis | Winner of the Conn Smythe Trophy; 1990 | Succeeded by Mario Lemieux |
