= 1991 Canada Cup =

1991 edition of the Canada Cup

Coupe du Canada de 1991 (French)

Tournament details
- Host countries: Canada; United States
- Venues: 8 (in 8 host cities)
- Dates: August 31 – September 16, 1991
- Teams: 6

Final positions
- Champions: Canada (4th title)

Tournament statistics
- Games played: 19
- Goals scored: 113 (5.95 per game)
- Scoring leader: (Canada) Wayne Gretzky (12 pts)

Awards
- MVP: Bill Ranford, Canada,

The 1991 Canada Cup (known as the Labatt Canada Cup for sponsorship reasons) was a professional international ice hockey tournament played in August and September 1991. It was the fifth instalment of the Canada Cup since its inception in 1976. The finals took place in Montreal on September 14 and Hamilton on September 16, and were won by Canada. The Canadians defeated the United States in a two-game sweep, to secure their fourth Canada Cup championship. The tournament was replaced by the World Cup of Hockey in 1996.

Of the five Canada Cup tournaments, this is the only one in which a team went undefeated; Canada compiled a record of six wins and two ties in eight games. The first tie was a stunning 2–2 result with underdog Finland on the opening day of the tournament, who got spectacular goaltending from Markus Ketterer. Finland surprised many by finishing in third place in the round robin; the first time they had ever qualified for the semi-finals in the history of the Canada Cup. The Americans were also very strong, as they iced their best international line-up to date. They went a perfect 5–0 against European competition in the tournament while losing three times to Canada.

The team representing the USSR was relatively weak compared to past tournaments. It did not have many of its top stars due to severe political turmoil at home, with many players declining to play for the team or purposely left off the roster (such as Pavel Bure and Vladimir Konstantinov) for fears of defection. It was not known until weeks before the start of the tournament that they would even send a team. This was the final major senior event in which a team representing the USSR would play.

Game 1 of the final is best remembered for the check on Wayne Gretzky by American defenseman Gary Suter, which knocked the Canadian captain out of the tournament and forced him to miss the first month of the NHL season. Game 2 was tied until late in the third period when Steve Larmer scored the tournament winner on a short-handed breakaway.

== Rosters ==
See 1991 Canada Cup rosters

== Standings ==
| Team | Pld | W | D | L | GF | GA | GD | Pts | Qualification |
|---|---|---|---|---|---|---|---|---|---|
| Canada (C) | 5 | 3 | 2 | 0 | 21 | 11 | +10 | 8 | Advanced to semifinals |
| United States | 5 | 4 | 0 | 1 | 19 | 15 | +4 | 8 | Advanced to semifinals |
| Finland | 5 | 2 | 1 | 2 | 10 | 13 | −3 | 5 | Advanced to semifinals |
| Sweden | 5 | 2 | 0 | 3 | 13 | 17 | −4 | 4 | Advanced to semifinals |
| Soviet Union | 5 | 1 | 1 | 3 | 14 | 14 | 0 | 3 | |
| Czechoslovakia | 5 | 1 | 0 | 4 | 11 | 18 | −7 | 2 | |

(C) Champions

== Results ==
=== Round-robin ===
| August 31, 1991 | Canada | 2–2 | Finland |

| August 31, 1991 | United States | 6–3 | Sweden |

| August 31, 1991 | Czechoslovakia | 5–2 | Soviet Union |

| September 2, 1991 | Canada | 6–3 | United States |

| September 2, 1991 | Sweden | 3–2 | Soviet Union |

| September 2, 1991 | Finland | 1–0 | Czechoslovakia |

| September 5, 1991 | Canada | 4–1 | Sweden |

| September 5, 1991 | United States | 4–2 | Czechoslovakia |

| September 5, 1991 | Soviet Union | 6–1 | Finland |

| September 7, 1991 | Canada | 6–2 | Czechoslovakia |

| September 7, 1991 | United States | 2–1 | Soviet Union |

| September 7, 1991 | Finland | 3–1 | Sweden |

| September 9, 1991 | Canada | 3–3 | Soviet Union |

| September 9, 1991 | United States | 4–3 | Finland |

| September 9, 1991 | Sweden | 5–2 | Czechoslovakia |

== Playoff round ==
=== Semi-finals ===
| September 11, 1991 | United States | 7–3 | Finland |

| September 12, 1991 | Canada | 4–0 | Sweden |

=== Final (best of three) ===
| September 14, 1991 | Canada | 4–1 | United States |

| September 16, 1991 | Canada | 4–2 | United States |

== Final standings ==
| 1 | Canada |
| 2 | United States |
| 3 | Finland |
| 4 | Sweden |
| 5 | Soviet Union |
| 6 | Czechoslovakia |

== Leading scorers ==
| Player | Team | GP | G | A | Pts | PIM |
|---|---|---|---|---|---|---|
| Wayne Gretzky | Canada | 7 | 4 | 8 | 12 | 2 |
| Steve Larmer | Canada | 8 | 6 | 5 | 11 | 4 |
| Brett Hull | United States | 8 | 2 | 7 | 9 | 0 |
| Mike Modano | United States | 8 | 2 | 7 | 9 | 2 |
| Mark Messier | Canada | 8 | 2 | 6 | 8 | 10 |
| Paul Coffey | Canada | 8 | 1 | 6 | 7 | 8 |
| Craig Janney | United States | 8 | 4 | 2 | 6 | 4 |
| Jeremy Roenick | United States | 8 | 4 | 2 | 6 | 4 |
| Mats Sundin | Sweden | 6 | 2 | 4 | 6 | 16 |
| Al MacInnis | Canada | 8 | 2 | 4 | 6 | 23 |

Top Goalie: Bill Ranford, Canada (1.75 GAA)

== Trophies and awards ==
=== Tournament champion ===
- Canada

=== Tournament MVP ===
- Bill Ranford, Canada,

=== All-star team ===
- Goaltender: Bill Ranford, Canada
- Defence: Al MacInnis, Canada; Chris Chelios, USA
- Forwards: Wayne Gretzky, Canada; Mats Sundin, Sweden; Jeremy Roenick, USA
