= List of Stanley Cup Final broadcasters =

The following is a list of national American and Canadian television, and radio networks and announcers that have broadcast Stanley Cup Final games over the years.

== American television ==
=== National television ===
==== 2020s ====
Year	Network(s)	Play-by-play	Color commentator(s)	Ice-level reporter(s)	Rinkside reporter(s)	Rules analyst	Studio host	Studio analyst(s)
2026	ABC/ESPN DTC	Sean McDonough	Ray Ferraro		Emily Kaplan	Dave Jackson	Steve Levy	Mark Messier, P. K. Subban, and Erik Johnson (Games 3 and 4)
2025	TNT/truTV/Max	Kenny Albert	Eddie Olczyk	Brian Boucher	Darren Pang and Jackie Redmond	—N/a	Liam McHugh	Anson Carter, Paul Bissonnette, Wayne Gretzky, and Henrik Lundqvist
2024	ABC/ESPN+	Sean McDonough	Ray Ferraro		Emily Kaplan; Kevin Weekes (Game seven postgame); Leah Hextall (in Edmonton; Game 7)	Dave Jackson	Steve Levy	Mark Messier and P. K. Subban
2023	TNT/truTV/TBS (except Game 5)	Kenny Albert	Eddie Olczyk	Keith Jones	Darren Pang and Jackie Redmond	Don Koharski	Liam McHugh	Anson Carter, Paul Bissonnette, Wayne Gretzky, and Henrik Lundqvist
2022	ABC	Sean McDonough	Ray Ferraro		Emily Kaplan; Kevin Weekes (Game six postgame)	Dave Jackson	Steve Levy	Mark Messier, Chris Chelios, and Brian Boucher
2022	ESPN+	Sean McDonough	Ray Ferraro		Emily Kaplan; Kevin Weekes (Game six postgame)	Dave Jackson	Linda Cohn (Games 1–2); John Buccigross (Games 3–6)	Kevin Weekes
2021	NBCSN (Games 1–2)	Kenny Albert	Eddie Olczyk (Games 1, 3–5); Brian Boucher (Game 2)	Brian Boucher (Games 1, 4–5); Pierre McGuire (Games 2, 3)		—N/a	Liam McHugh	Keith Jones, Anson Carter, and Patrick Sharp
2021	NBC (Games 3–5)	Kenny Albert	Eddie Olczyk (Games 1, 3–5); Brian Boucher (Game 2)	Brian Boucher (Games 1, 4–5); Pierre McGuire (Games 2, 3)		—N/a	Liam McHugh	Keith Jones, Anson Carter, and Patrick Sharp
2021	Peacock	Kenny Albert	Eddie Olczyk (Games 1, 3–5); Brian Boucher (Game 2)	Brian Boucher (Games 1, 4–5); Pierre McGuire (Games 2, 3)		—N/a	Kathryn Tappen	Pierre McGuire
2020	NBC (Games 1, 4–6)	Mike Emrick	Eddie Olczyk	Brian Boucher and Pierre McGuire		—N/a	Kathryn Tappen	Keith Jones, Anson Carter, and Patrick Sharp
2020	NBCSN (Games 2–3)	Mike Emrick	Eddie Olczyk	Brian Boucher and Pierre McGuire		—N/a	Kathryn Tappen	Keith Jones, Anson Carter, and Patrick Sharp

===== Notes =====
- 2020 - The NHL initially had plans to produce broadcasts for each game using a skeleton crew on-site, such as cameramen and producers, and then each media partner's commentators on both TV and radio were to call the games remotely. The league then allowed both Sportsnet and NBC commentators into the hubs. As he had been doing throughout the playoffs, 74-year-old NBC lead play-by-play commentator Mike Emrick called the Cup Finals off of monitors from his home studio in Metro Detroit, citing his advanced age as a potential risk for severe illness from COVID-19. These were the final games that Emrick called; he announced his retirement on October 19, 2020.
- On March 10, 2021, the National Hockey League and ESPN confirmed a 7-year television deal that will include games not only on ESPN, but also ABC, ESPN+, and Hulu beginning in the 2021–22 season. ABC will also broadcast four Stanley Cup Final over the life of the contract.
  - On April 26, 2021, Sports Business Journal reported that NBC had officially pulled out of bidding for future NHL rights, meaning that NBC will not televise NHL games for the first time since the 2004–05 NHL lockout. The next day, Turner Sports announced that they have agreed to a seven-year deal with the NHL to broadcast at least 72 games nationally on TNT and TBS (while also giving HBO Max the live streaming and simulcast rights to these games) beginning with the 2021–22 NHL season, which will include three Stanley Cup Finals, the other half of the Stanley Cup playoffs, and the Winter Classic.
- 2021 - NBC lead color commentator Eddie Olczyk missed game two due to a personal matter, so ice-level analyst Brian Boucher moved to the booth with Kenny Albert, and Pierre McGuire took over for Boucher between the benches. McGuire also filled in for Boucher in game three for the same reason.
- 2022 - ABC's coverage of the Stanley Cup Final marked the first time the entire Stanley Cup Final series would be carried exclusively on American broadcast television. Additionally, starting in game six, ABC's feed was carried in Canada on Sportsnet's over-the-air sister station Citytv for simultaneous substitution purposes.
- 2023 - TNT's coverage of the Stanley Cup Final marked the first time since 1994 that the entire series would be carried on a cable network since ESPN last did it 29 years before (1994), and the first time that it would exclusively be on cable. All of TNT's games in the Stanley Cup Final were simulcast on sister networks TruTV, and on most games, TBS due to Major League Baseball coverage every Tuesday night.

==== 2010s ====
Year	Network(s)	Play-by-play	Color commentator(s)	Ice level reporter(s)	Studio host	Studio analyst(s)
2019	NBC (Games 1, 4–7)	Mike Emrick	Eddie Olczyk	Pierre McGuire	Liam McHugh; Kathryn Tappen; Mike Tirico (NBC)	Mike Milbury and Keith Jones; Jeremy Roenick, Anson Carter, Brian Boucher, and Patrick Sharp
2019	NBCSN (Games 2–3)	Mike Emrick	Eddie Olczyk	Pierre McGuire	Liam McHugh; Kathryn Tappen; Mike Tirico (NBC)	Mike Milbury and Keith Jones; Jeremy Roenick, Anson Carter, Brian Boucher, and Patrick Sharp
2018	NBC (Games 1, 4–5)	Mike Emrick	Eddie Olczyk	Pierre McGuire	Liam McHugh; Kathryn Tappen; Paul Burmeister; Mike Tirico (NBC)	Keith Jones; Mike Milbury (Games 1–4); P. K. Subban (Game 5); Jeremy Roenick and Anson Carter; Brian Boucher
2018	NBCSN (Games 2–3)	Mike Emrick	Eddie Olczyk	Pierre McGuire	Liam McHugh; Kathryn Tappen; Paul Burmeister; Mike Tirico (NBC)	Keith Jones; Mike Milbury (Games 1–4); P. K. Subban (Game 5); Jeremy Roenick and Anson Carter; Brian Boucher
2017	NBC (Games 1, 4–6)	Mike Emrick	Eddie Olczyk	Pierre McGuire	Liam McHugh; Kathryn Tappen; Paul Burmeister	Mike Milbury and Keith Jones; Jeremy Roenick and Anson Carter; Brian Boucher
2017	NBCSN (Games 2–3)	Mike Emrick	Eddie Olczyk	Pierre McGuire	Liam McHugh; Kathryn Tappen; Paul Burmeister	Mike Milbury and Keith Jones; Jeremy Roenick and Anson Carter; Brian Boucher
2016	NBC (Games 1, 4–6)	Mike Emrick	Eddie Olczyk	Pierre McGuire	Liam McHugh; Kathryn Tappen; Dave Briggs	Mike Milbury and Keith Jones; Jeremy Roenick and Anson Carter; Brian Boucher
2016	NBCSN (Games 2–3)	Mike Emrick	Eddie Olczyk	Pierre McGuire	Liam McHugh; Kathryn Tappen; Dave Briggs	Mike Milbury and Keith Jones; Jeremy Roenick and Anson Carter; Brian Boucher
2015	NBC (Games 1–2, 5–6)	Mike Emrick	Eddie Olczyk (Games 1, 3–6); Mike Milbury (Game 2)	Pierre McGuire	Liam McHugh; Dave Briggs	Mike Milbury and Keith Jones; Jeremy Roenick, Anson Carter, and Brian Boucher
2015	NBCSN (Games 3–4)	Mike Emrick	Eddie Olczyk (Games 1, 3–6); Mike Milbury (Game 2)	Pierre McGuire	Liam McHugh; Dave Briggs	Mike Milbury and Keith Jones; Jeremy Roenick, Anson Carter, and Brian Boucher
2014	NBC (Games 1, 2, and 5)	Kenny Albert (Game 1); Mike Emrick (Games 2–5)	Eddie Olczyk	Pierre McGuire	Liam McHugh; Dave Briggs	Mike Milbury and Keith Jones; Jeremy Roenick and Anson Carter
2014	NBCSN (Games 3–4)	Kenny Albert (Game 1); Mike Emrick (Games 2–5)	Eddie Olczyk	Pierre McGuire	Liam McHugh; Dave Briggs	Mike Milbury and Keith Jones; Jeremy Roenick and Anson Carter
2013	NBC (Games 1, 4–6)	Mike Emrick	Eddie Olczyk	Pierre McGuire	Liam McHugh	Mike Milbury, Keith Jones, and Jeremy Roenick
2013	NBCSN (Games 2–3)	Mike Emrick	Eddie Olczyk	Pierre McGuire	Liam McHugh	Mike Milbury, Keith Jones, and Jeremy Roenick
2012	NBC (Games 1–2, 5–6)	Mike Emrick	Eddie Olczyk	Pierre McGuire	Liam McHugh; Bob Costas (Game 1)	Mike Milbury, Keith Jones, Jeremy Roenick, and Darren Pang
2012	NBCSN (Games 3–4)	Mike Emrick	Eddie Olczyk	Pierre McGuire	Liam McHugh; Bob Costas (Game 1)	Mike Milbury, Keith Jones, Jeremy Roenick, and Darren Pang
2011	NBC (Games 1–2, 5–7)	Mike Emrick	Eddie Olczyk	Pierre McGuire; Darren Pang (Games 6–7)	Liam McHugh (Games 1–2); Dan Patrick (Games 5–7)	Mike Milbury, Keith Jones, Jeremy Roenick, and Darren Pang
2011	Versus (Games 3–4)	Mike Emrick	Eddie Olczyk	Pierre McGuire; Darren Pang (Games 6–7)	Bill Patrick	Mike Milbury, Keith Jones, Jeremy Roenick, and Darren Pang
2010	NBC (Games 1–2, 5–6)	Mike Emrick	Eddie Olczyk	Pierre McGuire	Pierre McGuire (Games 1–2); Dan Patrick (Games 5–6)	Mike Milbury; Ryan Miller (Game 1); Jeremy Roenick (Games 2, 5–6)
2010	Versus (Games 3–4)	Mike Emrick	Eddie Olczyk	Charissa Thompson and Bob Harwood	Bill Patrick	Keith Jones and Brian Engblom

===== Notes =====
- In 2014, NBCSN broadcast games three and four, while NBC televised the remaining games. NBC Sports originally planned to repeat its coverage pattern from the last few seasons: NBCSN would televise games two and three, while NBC would broadcast game one, and then games four through seven so that all potential Cup clinchers are shown over-the-air. After the League scheduled game two on the day of the Belmont Stakes, coverage of games two and four were switched so NBC's telecast of the horse race would serve as lead-in programming to game two. Due to the death of a family member, NBC lead play-by-play announcer Mike Emrick missed game one. Kenny Albert, who was also the New York Rangers radio announcer for WEPN and announced several national games (including the Western Conference Finals) for NBC/NBCSN, filled in for Emrick in the first game.
- It was originally announced that games two and three of the 2015 Finals were to be broadcast by NBCSN, with the remainder on NBC. Game two was moved to NBC to serve as a lead-out for its coverage of the 2015 Belmont Stakes in favor of game four on NBCSN. As Eddie Olczyk was also a contributor to NBC's Belmont coverage, he was absent for game two, as a result, studio analyst Mike Milbury filled in for Olczyk in the color commentator role.
- On May 27, 2016, NBC Sports announced that if the Final was tied at 1–1 entering game three, then it would have aired on NBC and game four televised on NBCSN. However, if one team led 2–0 (as this eventually happened; Penguins led 2–0), game three would be moved to NBCSN and then game four on NBC.
- 2018 - P. K. Subban served as a studio analyst for NBC's coverage of game five of the Stanley Cup Final due to Mike Milbury attending his son's high school graduation.

==== 2000s ====
Year	Network(s)	Play-by-play	Color commentator(s)	Ice level reporter(s)	Studio host	Studio analyst(s)
2009	NBC (Games 1–2, 5–7)	Mike Emrick	Eddie Olczyk	Pierre McGuire	Darren Pang	Mike Milbury
2009	Versus (Games 3–4)	Mike Emrick	Eddie Olczyk	Christine Simpson and Bob Harwood	Bill Patrick	Keith Jones and Brian Engblom
2008	Versus (Games 1–2)	Mike Emrick	Eddie Olczyk	Christine Simpson and Bob Harwood	Bill Patrick	Keith Jones, Brian Engblom, and Mark Messier
2008	NBC (Games 3–6)	Mike Emrick	Eddie Olczyk	Pierre McGuire	Bob Neumeier	Mike Milbury and Pierre McGuire
2007	Versus (Games 1–2)	Mike Emrick	Eddie Olczyk	Christine Simpson and Bob Harwood	Bill Clement	Keith Jones, Brian Engblom, and Mark Messier
2007	NBC (Games 3–5)	Mike Emrick	Eddie Olczyk	Pierre McGuire	Bill Clement	Ray Ferraro and Brett Hull
2006	OLN (Games 1–2)	Mike Emrick	John Davidson	Christine Simpson and Bob Harwood	Bill Clement	Keith Jones, Neil Smith, Brian Engblom, and Mark Messier
2006	NBC (Games 3–7)	Mike Emrick	John Davidson	Pierre McGuire	Bill Clement	Ray Ferraro and Eddie Olczyk
2004	ESPN (Games 1–2)	Gary Thorne	Bill Clement and John Davidson	Darren Pang, Sam Ryan, Steve Levy, and Erin Andrews	John Saunders	Barry Melrose and Darren Pang
2004	ABC (Games 3–7)	Gary Thorne	Bill Clement and John Davidson	Darren Pang, Sam Ryan, Steve Levy, and Erin Andrews	John Saunders	Barry Melrose and Darren Pang
2003	ESPN (Games 1–2)	Gary Thorne	Bill Clement	Brian Engblom, Darren Pang, and Sam Ryan	John Saunders and Chris Berman	Barry Melrose and Darren Pang
2003	ABC (Games 3–7)	Gary Thorne	Bill Clement and John Davidson	Brian Engblom, Darren Pang, and Sam Ryan	John Saunders and Chris Berman	Barry Melrose and Darren Pang
2002	ESPN (Games 1–2)	Gary Thorne	Bill Clement	Brian Engblom and Darren Pang	John Saunders	Barry Melrose
2002	ABC (Games 3–5)	Gary Thorne	Bill Clement	Brian Engblom and Darren Pang	Al Michaels and John Saunders	John Davidson and Barry Melrose
2001	ESPN (Games 1–2)	Gary Thorne	Bill Clement	Brian Engblom and Darren Pang	John Saunders	Barry Melrose
2001	ABC (Games 3–7)	Gary Thorne	Bill Clement	Brian Engblom and Darren Pang	Al Michaels and John Saunders	John Davidson and Barry Melrose
2000	ESPN (Games 1–2)	Gary Thorne	Bill Clement	Brian Engblom and Darren Pang	John Saunders	Barry Melrose
2000	ABC (Game 3–6)	Gary Thorne	Bill Clement	Brian Engblom and Darren Pang	John Saunders (all games); Al Michaels (Games 3–5)	John Davidson and Barry Melrose

===== Notes =====
- Following the 2003–04 season, ESPN was only willing to renew its contract for two additional years at $60 million per year. ABC refused to televise the Stanley Cup Final in prime time, suggesting that the Final games it would telecast be played on weekend afternoons (including a potential game seven). Disney executives later conceded that they overpaid for the 1999–2004 deal, so the company's offer to renew the television rights was lower in 2004.
- 2003 was the only year that ABC broadcast both the NBA and the Stanley Cup Finals that involved teams from one city in the same year, as both the New Jersey Nets and the New Jersey Devils were in their respective league's finals. During ABC's broadcast of game three between the San Antonio Spurs and the Nets in New Jersey on June 8, Brad Nessler said that ABC was in a unique situation getting ready for both that game and game seven of the Stanley Cup Final between the Devils and the Mighty Ducks of Anaheim the following night, also at Continental Airlines Arena. Gary Thorne mentioned this the following night, and thanked Nessler for promoting ABC's broadcast of game seven of the Stanley Cup Final.

==== 1990s ====
Year	Network(s)	Play-by-play	Color commentator(s)	Ice level reporter(s)	Studio host	Studio analyst(s)
1999	Fox (in Dallas)	Mike Emrick	John Davidson	Joe Micheletti	Suzy Kolber	Terry Crisp
1999	ESPN (in Buffalo)	Gary Thorne	Bill Clement	Brian Engblom and Darren Pang	John Saunders	Barry Melrose and Darren Pang
1998	Fox (Game 1)	Mike Emrick	John Davidson	Joe Micheletti	James Brown	Dave Maloney and Terry Crisp
1998	ESPN (Games 2–4)	Gary Thorne	Bill Clement	Brian Engblom and Darren Pang	John Saunders	Barry Melrose and Darren Pang
1997	Fox (Game 1)	Mike Emrick	John Davidson	Joe Micheletti and Craig Simpson	James Brown	Dave Maloney
1997	ESPN (Games 2–4)	Gary Thorne	Bill Clement	Brian Engblom, Darren Pang, and Al Morganti	John Saunders	Barry Melrose and Darren Pang
1996	Fox (Games 1, 3)	Mike Emrick	John Davidson	Joe Micheletti and Sandra Neil	James Brown	Dave Maloney
1996	ESPN (Games 2, 4)	Gary Thorne	Bill Clement	Brian Engblom, Darren Pang, and Al Morganti	John Saunders	Barry Melrose and Darren Pang
1995	Fox (Games 1, 4)	Mike Emrick	John Davidson	Joe Micheletti	James Brown	Dave Maloney
1995	ESPN (Games 2, 3)	Gary Thorne	Bill Clement	Al Morganti, Steve Levy, and Darren Pang	John Saunders	Barry Melrose, Mike Milbury, and Darren Pang
1994	ESPN	Gary Thorne	Bill Clement	Al Morganti and Steve Levy	John Saunders	Barry Melrose and Darren Pang
1993	ESPN	Gary Thorne	Bill Clement	Tom Mees and Al Morganti	John Saunders	Jim Schoenfeld and John Davidson
1992	SportsChannel America	Jiggs McDonald	Bill Clement	John Davidson	Mike Emrick	John Davidson
1991	SportsChannel America	Jiggs McDonald	Bill Clement	John Davidson	Mike Emrick	John Davidson
1990	SportsChannel America	Jiggs McDonald	Bill Clement	John Davidson	Mike Emrick	John Davidson

===== Notes =====
- Fox split coverage of the Stanley Cup Finals with ESPN. Game one of the 1995 Stanley Cup Final was the first Finals game shown on network television since 1980 and the first in prime time since 1973. Games one, five, and seven were usually scheduled to be televised by Fox; and games two, three, four, and six were set to air on ESPN. However, from 1995 to 1998, the Finals matches were all four game sweeps; the 1999 Finals ended in six games. The consequence was that – except for 1995 when Fox did televise game four – the decisive game seven was never shown on network television. Perhaps in recognition of this, games three through seven were always televised by ABC in the succeeding broadcast agreement between the NHL and ABC Sports/ESPN.
  - KTVU, the Fox affiliate in the San Francisco Bay Area, dropped game four of the 1995 Stanley Cup Final (June 24) for a San Francisco Giants game. The game between the Giants and Florida Marlins in Miami had a long rain delay. This allowed KTVU to broadcast the hockey game after all. However, the baseball game finally started before the hockey game ended. KTVU got a lot of complaints, so they re-aired the end of the hockey game next Saturday (July 1).

==== 1980s ====
Year	Network(s)	Play-by-play	Color commentator(s)	Ice level reporter(s)	Studio host	Studio analyst(s)
1989	SportsChannel America	Jiggs McDonald	Bill Clement	Herb Brooks	Mike Emrick	Herb Brooks
1988	ESPN	Mike Emrick	Bill Clement (Games 1–4); Mickey Redmond (Game 5)	Mickey Redmond (Games 1–4)	Tom Mees	
1987	ESPN	Mike Emrick	Bill Clement	Tom Mees		
1986	ESPN	Sam Rosen (Games 1–2); Ken Wilson (Games 3–5)	Mickey Redmond (in Calgary); Bill Clement (in Montreal)	Jim Kelly	Tom Mees	Mike Liut
1985	USA Network	Dan Kelly (in Philadelphia); Al Albert (in Edmonton)	Gary Green and Mike Liut	—N/a	Al Trautwig	Mike Liut
1984	USA Network	Dan Kelly	Gary Green	—N/a	Al Trautwig	
1983	USA Network	Dan Kelly	Gary Green	—N/a	Al Trautwig (in Edmonton); Al Albert (in Long Island, New York)	
1982	USA Network	Dan Kelly	Gary Green	—N/a	Al Trautwig (in Long Island, New York); Jim Van Horne (in Vancouver)	
1981	USA Network (CBC's feed)	Bob Cole	Mickey Redmond and Gary Dornhoefer	—N/a	Dave Hodge	Don Cherry (in Long Island, New York); Howie Meeker (in Bloomington, Minnesota)
1980	Hughes (Games 1–5; CBC feed)	Dan Kelly (Games 1–4; 2nd half, OT of Game 1, and 1st half of Game 5); Bob Cole (Games 1–2; 1st half); Jim Robson (Games 3–4; first half and second half of Game 5)	Gary Dornhoefer and Dick Irvin Jr.	—N/a	Dave Hodge	Don Cherry and Howie Meeker
1980	CBS (Game 6)	Dan Kelly (1st and 3rd periods and OT); Tim Ryan (2nd period)	Lou Nanne	—N/a	Tim Ryan	

===== Notes =====
- 1980 - Games 1–5 on Hughes used CBC's feed. For CBS' coverage of game six (which served as a special edition of the CBS Sports Spectacular anthology series), Dan Kelly did play-by-play for 1st and 3rd periods as well as overtime. Meanwhile, Tim Ryan did play-by-play for the second period. Minnesota North Stars' general manager Lou Nanne provided color commentary for the entire game. This was the last time that a National Hockey League game was broadcast on American network television for 10 years (until the 1990 NHL All-Star Game aired on NBC), and the Stanley Cup Final game on broadcast-network television until 1995.
  - CBS was mainly influenced by the United States men's Olympic hockey team's surprise gold medal victory (dubbed "The Miracle on Ice") in Lake Placid several months prior. CBS agreed to pay $37 million to broadcast the sixth game. In return, the NHL happily moved the starting time from prime time to the afternoon. The Saturday afternoon game was the first full American network telecast of an NHL game since game five of the 1975 Stanley Cup Final aired on NBC. Game six pulled a 4.4 rating on CBS. After the game ended, except for its owned-and-operated stations in New York City and Philadelphia, CBS discontinued the telecast and went to a previously scheduled golf telecast. New York and Philadelphia viewers saw a post-game show before the network joined the very end of the golf broadcast. Given that the game went into overtime, CBS cut away from hockey during the intermission between the end of regulation and the start of overtime to present ten minutes of live golf coverage, with the golf announcers repeatedly mentioning that the network would return to hockey in time for the start of sudden-death.
- USA Network simulcast the CBC feed for the 1981 Stanley Cup Final instead of producing their own coverage.
- In the 1981–82 season, Al Trautwig took over as studio host for USA Network. Dan Kelly did play-by-play with either Gary Green or Rod Gilbert on color commentary. For the playoffs, Dick Carlson and Al Albert were added as play-by-play voices of some games. Meanwhile, Jim Van Horne hosted Stanley Cup Final games played in Vancouver. Things pretty much remained the same for USA during the 1982–83 season. Dan Kelly and Gary Green called most games, while Al Albert did play-by-play or hosted several playoff games, including two Stanley Cup Final games from Nassau Coliseum.

==== 1970s ====
Year	Network(s)	Play-by-play	Color commentator(s)	Studio host	Studio analyst(s)
1979	NHL Network (CBC feed)	Dan Kelly; Danny Gallivan (first half of Game 2)	Dick Irvin Jr. Gary Dornhoefer (Games 1, 5); Gerry Pinder (Game 2); Bobby Orr (in New York City)	Dick Irvin Jr. and Dan Kelly (in Montreal); Dave Hodge (in New York City)	Howie Meeker (in New York City)
1979	ABC (Game 7)	Al Michaels	Bobby Clarke and Frank Gifford	Jim McKay	
1978	NHL Network (CBC feed)	Danny Gallivan (in Montreal); Dan Kelly (in Boston)	Chico Resch and Dick Irvin Jr.	Dick Irvin Jr. and Dan Kelly (in Montreal); Dave Hodge (in Boston)	Lou Nanne
1977	NHL Network	Marv Albert, Tim Ryan, and Dan Kelly	Stan Mikita (Game 1); Garry Unger (Game 2); Chico Resch (Game 3); Don Awrey (Game 4)		
1976	NHL Network	Marv Albert (Games 1, 3–4); Ted Darling (Game 2)	Stan Mikita (Game 1); Garry Unger (Game 2); Chico Resch (Game 3); Curt Bennett (Game 4)		
1975	NBC (Games 2, 5)	Tim Ryan	Ted Lindsay	Brian McFarlane	
1974	NBC (Games 3, 6)	Tim Ryan	Ted Lindsay	Brian McFarlane	
1973	NBC (Games 1, 4–6)	Tim Ryan	Ted Lindsay	Brian McFarlane	
1972	CBS (Games 1, 4, 6)	Dan Kelly	Jim Gordon and Harry Howell	Jim Gordon	
1971	CBS (Games 3, 6–7)	Dan Kelly	Jim Gordon and Phil Esposito	Jim Gordon	
1970	CBS (Games 1, 4)	Dan Kelly	Bill Mazer and Gordie Howe	Bill Mazer	

===== Note =====
- *: ABC was contracted to televise game seven. Since the 1979 Finals ended in five games, the contract was void. Had there been a seventh game, then Al Michaels would have called play-by-play alongside Jim McKay (between-periods host), Bobby Clarke (color commentator), and Frank Gifford (reporter, who would have been in the winning team's dressing room to interview players and coaches as well as hand the phone to the winning team's coach that would have allowed him to talk to both President Jimmy Carter and Prime Minister Pierre Trudeau). This would've given Michaels the honor of being the first to provide the play-by-play in all four major sports, having called the Super Bowl, the World Series, and NBA Finals. The game would have started at 5:10 p.m. Eastern Daylight Time on a Saturday, replacing Wide World of Sports and local news shows that typically followed it on ABC stations in the Eastern and Central time zones.

==== 1960s ====
Year	Network(s)	Play-by-play	Color commentator(s)	Studio host(s)
1969	CBS (Games 1, 4)	Dan Kelly	Bill Mazer	
1968	CBS (Games 1, 4)	Jim Gordon	Stu Nahan	
1967	CBS (Games 2, 5)	Jim Gordon	Stu Nahan	
1966	NBC (Games 1, 4)	Win Elliot	Bill Mazer	Jim Simpson and Bill Cullen
1966	RKO General (Game 6)	Bob Wolff	Emile Francis	

===== Notes =====
- NBC aired Games 1 and 4 of the 1966 Stanley Cup Final between the Montreal Canadiens and the Detroit Red Wings. Win Elliot served as the play-by-play man while Bill Mazer served as the color commentator for the games.
- For the 1968 playoffs, Jim Gordon worked play-by-play, and Stu Nahan worked color commentator and intermission interviews for CBS. During the regular season, the pair alternated roles each week. For instance, Gordon worked play-by-play on December 30 while Nahan did the same the next week. In 1968–69, Dan Kelly did play-by-play while Bill Mazer did color and intermission interviews. While Kelly once again handled all the play-by-play work in 1971, Gordon replaced Mazer in 1970–71. For the CBS' Stanley Cup Final coverage during this period, a third voice was added to the booth (Phil Esposito in 1971 and Harry Howell in 1972).

=== Local television (United States) ===
==== 1990s ====
Year	Network	Play-by-play	Color commentator(s)	Ice level reporter(s)	Studio host	Studio analyst(s)
1994	MSG Network (Games 1–3, 6–7) (New York area; New York Rangers); MSG II (Games 4–5) (New York area; New York Rangers)	Sam Rosen	John Davidson	Al Trautwig		
1993	Prime Ticket (Los Angeles area)	Bob Miller	Jim Fox			
1992	KBL (Pittsburgh area; in Pittsburgh); KDKA (Pittsburgh area; in Chicago)	Mike Lange	Paul Steigerwald	—N/a	Stan Savran	
1992	SportsChannel Chicago (Chicago area; in Pittsburgh); Hawkvision (Chicago area; in Chicago)	Pat Foley	Dale Tallon			
1991	KBL (Pittsburgh area; in Pittsburgh); KDKA (Pittsburgh area; in Bloomington, Minnesota)	Mike Lange	Paul Steigerwald	—N/a	Stan Savran	
1991	KMSP (Minnesota area; in Pittsburgh); Pay-Per-View (Minnesota area; in Bloomington, Minnesota)	Doug McLeod	Lou Nanne			
1990	NESN (Boston area; in Boston)	Fred Cusick	Derek Sanderson and Dave Shea	Dave Shea	Tom Larson	
1990	WSBK (Boston area; in Edmonton)	Fred Cusick	Derek Sanderson	—N/a	Gene Lavanchy	Johnny Peirson

===== Notes =====
- Games four and five of the 1994 Stanley Cup Final in the New York City area on its secondary MSG 2 channel, due to conflicts with the Yankees schedule. 1994 was also the last time that local broadcasting of playoff games past the first two rounds was allowed.

==== 1980s ====
Year	Network	Play-by-play	Color commentator(s)	Ice level reporter(s)	Studio host	Studio analyst(s)
1988	WSBK (Boston area; Games 1–2, 4)	Fred Cusick	Derek Sanderson (all games) and Dave Shea (in Boston)	Dave Shea and Sean McDonough (both in Boston)	Sean McDonough and Walt Perkins	Johnny Peirson
1988	NESN (Boston area; in Boston)	Fred Cusick	Derek Sanderson (all games) and Dave Shea (in Boston)	Dave Shea and Sean McDonough (both in Boston)	Tom Larson	
1987	WGBS (Philadelphia area; in Edmonton)	Gene Hart	Bobby Taylor	—N/a	Tony Bruno	Ed Van Impe
1987	PRISM (Philadelphia area; in Philadelphia)	Gene Hart	Bobby Taylor	—N/a	Tony Bruno	Ed Van Impe
1985	PRISM (Philadelphia area; in Philadelphia)	Gene Hart	Bobby Taylor	—N/a	Tony Bruno	Ed Van Impe
1985	WTAF (Philadelphia area; in Edmonton)	Gene Hart	Bobby Taylor	—N/a	Tony Bruno	Ed Van Impe
1984	SportsChannel New York (New York area; in Long Island)	Jiggs McDonald	Ed Westfall	Stan Fischler		
1984	WOR (New York area; in Edmonton)	Jiggs McDonald	Ed Westfall	Stan Fischler		
1983	WOR (New York area; in Edmonton)	Jiggs McDonald	Ed Westfall	Stan Fischler		
1983	SportsChannel New York (New York area; in Long Island)	Jiggs McDonald	Ed Westfall	Stan Fischler		
1982	SportsChannel New York (New York area; in Long Island)	Jiggs McDonald	Ed Westfall	Stan Fischler		
1982	WOR (New York area; in Vancouver)	Jiggs McDonald	Ed Westfall	Stan Fischler		
1981	SportsChannel New York (New York area; in Long Island)	Jiggs McDonald and Tim Ryan	Ed Westfall	Stan Fischler		
1981	WOR (New York area; in Minnesota)	Jiggs McDonald and Tim Ryan	Ed Westfall	Stan Fischler		
1981	KMSP (Minnesota area)	Bob Kurtz	Tom Reid			
1980	WKBS-TV/PRISM (Philadelphia area; Games 1–5)	Gene Hart	Bobby Taylor	—N/a	Tony Bruno	Ed Van Impe

==== 1970s ====
Year	Network	Play-by-play	Color commentator(s)	Studio host
1979	WOR (New York area)	Jim Gordon	Bill Chadwick	
1978	WSBK (Boston area)	Fred Cusick	Johnny Peirson	Tom Larson
1977	WSBK (Boston area)	Fred Cusick	Johnny Peirson	Tom Larson
1976	WTAF (Philadelphia area)	Don Earle and Gene Hart		
1975	WTAF (Philadelphia area; in Buffalo)	Don Earle and Gene Hart		
1975	WKBW (Buffalo area; Games 1, 3–4, 6)	Ted Darling	Pat Hannigan	Rick Azar
1974	WSBK (Boston area; Games 1–2, 4–5)	Fred Cusick	Johnny Peirson	Tom Larson
1974	WTAF (Philadelphia area; in Boston)	Don Earle and Gene Hart		
1973	WGN (Chicago area; Game 2)	Jim West		
1972	WSBK (Boston area; Games 2–3, 5)	Fred Cusick	Johnny Peirson	Tom Larson
1972	WOR (New York area; Games 2, 5); MSG Network (New York area; Game 3)	Tim Ryan	Jim Gordon	
1971	WGN (Chicago area; Game 4)	Jim West		
1970	WSBK (Boston area; Games 2–3)	Don Earle	Johnny Peirson	Tom Larson
1970	KPLR (St. Louis area; Games 2–3)	Dan Kelly	Gus Kyle	

==== 1960s ====
Year	Network	Play-by-play	Color commentator
1969	KPLR (Games 2–3)	Dan Kelly	Gus Kyle
1968	KPLR (Games 2–3)	Jack Buck	Gus Kyle
1962	WGN (in Toronto)	Joe Wilson	Lloyd Pettit
1961	WGN (Game 6, simulcast with CBC Television)	Bill Hewitt	Foster Hewitt

== Canadian television (English) ==
=== 2020s ===
Year	Network(s)	Play-by-play	Colour commentator(s)	Ice level reporter(s)	Studio host	Studio analysts
2026	CBC/Sportsnet/Sportsnet+	Chris Cuthbert	Craig Simpson	Kyle Bukauskas	Ron MacLean and David Amber	Kelly Hrudey, Elliotte Friedman, Kevin Bieksa, and Jennifer Botterill
2025	CBC/Sportsnet/Sportsnet+	Chris Cuthbert	Craig Simpson	Gene Principe	Ron MacLean and David Amber	Kelly Hrudey, Elliotte Friedman, Kevin Bieksa, and Jennifer Botterill
2024	CBC/Sportsnet/Sportsnet+	Chris Cuthbert	Craig Simpson	Kyle Bukauskas; Gene Principe (in Edmonton)	Ron MacLean and David Amber	Kelly Hrudey, Elliotte Friedman, Kevin Bieksa, and Jennifer Botterill
2023	CBC/Sportsnet/Sportsnet+	Chris Cuthbert	Craig Simpson	Kyle Bukauskas	Ron MacLean and David Amber	Kelly Hrudey, Elliotte Friedman, Kevin Bieksa, and Jennifer Botterill
2022	CBC/Sportsnet/Sportsnet+	Chris Cuthbert	Craig Simpson	Kyle Bukauskas	Ron MacLean and David Amber	Kelly Hrudey, Elliotte Friedman, Kevin Bieksa, and Jennifer Botterill
2021	CBC/Sportsnet/Sportsnet+	Chris Cuthbert	Craig Simpson	Kyle Bukauskas	Ron MacLean and David Amber	Kelly Hrudey, Elliotte Friedman, Kevin Bieksa, and Jennifer Botterill
2020	CBC/Sportsnet/Sportsnet+	Jim Hughson	Craig Simpson	Scott Oake	Ron MacLean and David Amber	Kelly Hrudey, Elliotte Friedman, Kevin Bieksa, and Jennifer Botterill

==== Notes ====
- On June 16, 2026, CBC and Rogers terminated its sublicensing agreement for Hockey Night in Canada. The 2026 Stanley Cup Final marked CBC's final NHL broadcasts, ending a 74-year partnership. This also marked the final NHL broadcasts on over-the-air television in Canada, as all games on Sportsnet from 2026 onward would be exclusive to pay television.

=== 2010s ===
Year	Network(s)	Play-by-play	Colour commentator(s)	Ice level reporter(s)	Studio host	Studio analyst(s)
2019	CBC	Jim Hughson	Craig Simpson	Scott Oake	Ron MacLean	Kelly Hrudey, Nick Kypreos, and Elliotte Friedman
2019	Sportsnet	Jim Hughson	Craig Simpson	Scott Oake	Ron MacLean	Don Cherry (Coach's Corner)
2018	CBC	Jim Hughson	Craig Simpson	Scott Oake and David Amber	Ron MacLean	Kelly Hrudey, Nick Kypreos, and Elliotte Friedman
2018	Sportsnet	Jim Hughson	Craig Simpson	Scott Oake and David Amber	Ron MacLean	Don Cherry (Coach's Corner)
2017	CBC	Jim Hughson	Craig Simpson	Scott Oake and David Amber	Ron MacLean	Kelly Hrudey, Nick Kypreos, and Elliotte Friedman
2017	Sportsnet	Jim Hughson	Craig Simpson	Scott Oake and David Amber	Ron MacLean	Don Cherry (Coach's Corner)
2016	CBC	Jim Hughson	Craig Simpson	Glenn Healy, Scott Oake, and Elliotte Friedman	George Stroumboulopoulos	Kelly Hrudey and Nick Kypreos
2016	Sportsnet	Jim Hughson	Craig Simpson	Glenn Healy, Scott Oake, and Elliotte Friedman	Ron MacLean (Coach's Corner)	Don Cherry (Coach's Corner)
2015	CBC	Jim Hughson	Craig Simpson	Glenn Healy, Scott Oake, and Christine Simpson	George Stroumboulopoulos	Kelly Hrudey, Nick Kypreos, Elliotte Friedman, Mike Johnson, and Mark Messier
2015	Sportsnet	Jim Hughson	Craig Simpson	Glenn Healy, Scott Oake, and Christine Simpson	Ron MacLean (Coach's Corner)	Don Cherry (Coach's Corner)
2014	CBC	Jim Hughson	Craig Simpson	Glenn Healy and Scott Oake	Ron MacLean	Don Cherry, Kelly Hrudey, P. J. Stock, and Elliotte Friedman
2013	CBC	Jim Hughson	Craig Simpson	Glenn Healy and Scott Oake	Ron MacLean	Don Cherry, Kelly Hrudey, P. J. Stock, and Elliotte Friedman
2012	CBC	Jim Hughson	Craig Simpson	Glenn Healy, Scott Oake, and Elliotte Friedman	Ron MacLean	Don Cherry, Kelly Hrudey, and P. J. Stock
2011	CBC	Jim Hughson	Craig Simpson	Glenn Healy, Scott Oake, and Elliotte Friedman	Ron MacLean	Don Cherry, Kelly Hrudey, and P. J. Stock
2010	CBC	Jim Hughson	Craig Simpson	Glenn Healy, Scott Oake, and Elliotte Friedman	Ron MacLean	Don Cherry, Kelly Hrudey, and P. J. Stock

=== 2000s ===
Year	Network(s)	Play-by-play	Colour commentator(s)	Ice level reporter(s)	Studio host	Studio analysts
2009	CBC	Jim Hughson	Craig Simpson	Scott Oake and Elliotte Friedman	Ron MacLean	Don Cherry, Kelly Hrudey, and P. J. Stock
2008	CBC	Bob Cole	Greg Millen	Elliotte Friedman and Scott Oake	Ron MacLean (primary – ice level); Scott Oake (secondary – press box)	Don Cherry (primary – ice level); Kelly Hrudey and Craig Simpson (secondary – press box)
2007	CBC	Bob Cole	Harry Neale and Greg Millen	Scott Oake and Elliotte Friedman	Ron MacLean	Don Cherry and Kelly Hrudey
2006	CBC	Bob Cole	Harry Neale	Scott Oake and Elliotte Friedman	Ron MacLean	Don Cherry and Kelly Hrudey
2004	CBC	Bob Cole	Harry Neale	Scott Oake and Elliotte Friedman	Ron MacLean	Don Cherry
2003	CBC	Bob Cole	Harry Neale	Scott Russell and Scott Oake	Ron MacLean	Don Cherry
2002	CBC	Bob Cole	Harry Neale	Scott Russell and Scott Oake	Ron MacLean	Don Cherry
2001	CBC	Bob Cole	Harry Neale	Scott Russell and Scott Oake	Ron MacLean	Don Cherry
2000	CBC	Bob Cole	Harry Neale	Scott Russell and Scott Oake	Ron MacLean	Don Cherry

=== 1990s ===
Year	Network(s)	Play-by-play	Colour commentator(s)	Ice level reporter(s)	Studio host	Studio analysts
1999	CBC	Bob Cole	Harry Neale	Scott Russell and Scott Oake	Ron MacLean	Don Cherry
1998	CBC	Bob Cole	Harry Neale	Scott Russell and Scott Oake	Ron MacLean	Don Cherry
1997	CBC	Bob Cole	Harry Neale	Scott Russell (Games 1, 4); Chris Cuthbert (Games 2, 3)	Ron MacLean (Games 1, 4); Scott Russell (Games 2, 3)	Kelly Hrudey
1996	CBC	Bob Cole	Harry Neale	Scott Russell	Ron MacLean	Don Cherry
1995	CBC	Bob Cole	Harry Neale	Scott Russell	Ron MacLean	Don Cherry
1994	CBC	Bob Cole	Harry Neale and Dick Irvin Jr.	—N/a	Ron MacLean	Don Cherry
1993	CBC	Bob Cole	Harry Neale and Dick Irvin Jr.	—N/a	Ron MacLean	Don Cherry
1992	CBC	Bob Cole	Harry Neale and Dick Irvin Jr.	—N/a	Ron MacLean	Don Cherry
1991	CBC	Bob Cole	Harry Neale and Dick Irvin Jr.	—N/a	Ron MacLean	Don Cherry
1990	CBC	Bob Cole	Harry Neale	Chris Cuthbert	Ron MacLean	Don Cherry

==== Note ====
- 1997 – Don Cherry missed the entire series due to family illness. On Sunday, June 1, his wife, Pennsylvania native Rose, died from liver cancer. Consequently, Ron MacLean did not host Games 2 and 3 as he was attending Don Cherry's wife, Rose's funeral. Scott Russell sat in for him as host, and Chris Cuthbert took over Russell's reporting role.

=== 1980s ===
Year	Network(s)	Play-by-play	Colour commentator(s)	Ice level reporter(s)	Studio host	Studio analyst
1989	CBC	Bob Cole	Harry Neale and Dick Irvin Jr.	Chris Cuthbert	Ron MacLean	Don Cherry
1988	Canwest/Global (Games 1–2)	Dan Kelly	John Davidson	Jim Tatti	Dave Hodge	
1988	CBC (Games 3–5)	Bob Cole	Harry Neale	Chris Cuthbert (Game 5)	Ron MacLean	Don Cherry
1987	CBC (Games 1–2, 6–7)	Bob Cole	Harry Neale	Chris Cuthbert (Game 7)	Ron MacLean	Don Cherry
1987	Canwest/Global (Games 3–5, 7)	Dan Kelly	John Davidson	Jim Tatti	Dave Hodge	
1986	CTV (Games 1–2)	Dan Kelly	Ron Reusch and Brad Park	—N/a	Dan Matheson	Brad Park
1986	CBC (Games 3–5)	Bob Cole (in Montreal); Don Wittman (in Calgary)	Dick Irvin Jr. Mickey Redmond (in Montreal); John Davidson (in Calgary)	—N/a	Dave Hodge	Don Cherry
1985	CBC (Games 1–2)	Bob Cole	Gary Dornhoefer and John Davidson	—N/a	Dave Hodge	Don Cherry
1985	CTV (Games 3–5)	Dan Kelly	Ron Reusch, Tom Watt, and Brad Park	—N/a	Dan Matheson	Brad Park
1984	CBC	Bob Cole	Dick Irvin Jr. Mickey Redmond (in Long Island, New York); Gary Dornhoefer (in Edmonton)	—N/a	Dave Hodge (in Long Island, New York); John Wells (in Edmonton)	Don Cherry (in Long Island, New York); Howie Meeker (in Edmonton)
1983	CBC	Jim Robson (in Edmonton); Bob Cole (in Long Island, New York)	Gary Dornhoefer (in Edmonton); Mickey Redmond (in Long Island, New York)	—N/a	John Wells (in Edmonton); Dave Hodge (in Long Island, New York)	Howie Meeker (in Edmonton); Don Cherry (in Long Island, New York)
1982	CBC	Bob Cole (in Long Island, New York); Jim Robson (in Vancouver)	Mickey Redmond and Dick Irvin Jr. (in Long Island, New York); Howie Meeker and Gary Dornhoefer (in Vancouver)	—N/a	Dave Hodge (in Long Island, New York); Steve Armitage (in Vancouver)	Don Cherry (in Long Island, New York)
1981	CBC	Bob Cole	Mickey Redmond and Gary Dornhoefer	—N/a	Dave Hodge	Don Cherry (in Long Island, New York); Howie Meeker (in Bloomington, Minnesota)
1980	CBC	Dan Kelly (Games 1–5; second half of games 1–4, first half of game five, and OT of game one); Bob Cole (Games 1–2; 1st half); Jim Robson (1st half of games 3–4, second half of game five, and game six entirely)	Gary Dornhoefer and Dick Irvin Jr.	—N/a	Dave Hodge	Don Cherry and Howie Meeker

==== Notes ====
- In 1980, Bob Cole, Dan Kelly and Jim Robson shared play-by-play duties for CBC's coverage. Cole did play-by-play for the first half of Games 1, and 2. Meanwhile, Kelly did play-by-play for the rest of games 1–4 and the first half of game five (Kelly also did call the overtime period of Game 1). Finally, Robson did play-by-play for the first half of games 3–4, the rest of game five, and game six entirely. In essence, this meant that Cole or Robson would do play-by-play for the first period and the first half of the second period. Therefore, at the closest stoppage of play near the 10-minute mark of the second period, Cole or Robson handed off the call to Kelly for the rest of the game.
- For the 1984–85 and 1985–86 seasons, CTV aired regular season games on Friday nights (and some Sunday afternoons) as well as partial coverage of the playoffs and Stanley Cup Final. While Molson continued to present Hockey Night in Canada on Saturday nights on CBC, rival brewery Carling O'Keefe began airing Friday Night Hockey on CTV. This marked the first time since beginning broadcasting in 1952 that CBC was not the lone over-the-air network broadcaster of the Stanley Cup Final in Canada. From 1967 through 1975, both CBC and CTV aired NHL games, but it was from a Molson-led Hockey Night in Canada package that was split. CBC got the Saturday games and the playoffs; Wednesday-night regular-season games appeared on CTV.
- In 1985, CBC televised games one and two nationally while games three, four, and five were televised in Edmonton only. CTV televised games three, four, and five nationally while games were blacked out in Edmonton. Had the series gone to a game seven, then both CBC and CTV would have televised it while using their own production facilities and crews. Dan Kelly, Ron Reusch, and Brad Park called the games on CTV.
- For games one and two of the 1986 Finals, CBC only had the rights to air them locally in Montreal and Calgary, while CTV broadcast it to the rest of the country. CBC would then have the exclusive rights to televise games three, four, and five nationally. Had the series gone to a seventh game, then both CBC and CTV would have simultaneously televised it while using their own production facilities and crews. Like the year prior, Dan Kelly, Ron Reusch, and Brad Park called the games for CTV.
- Even though CTV decided to pull the plug on their two-year-old (lasting from 1984 to 1985 through 1985–86) NHL broadcasting venture with the Carling O'Keefe brewing company (citing low ratings and an inability to clear other programming for both regular season and playoff telecasts), Carling O'Keefe retained their rights. This soon led to them syndicating 1987 and 1988 playoff telecasts on a chain of channels that would one day become the Global Television Network. The Global Television Network broadcasts were aired under the names Stanley Cup '87 and Stanley Cup '88 before a merger between Carling O'Keefe and Molson (the presenters of Hockey Night in Canada on CBC) put an end to the competition. Unlike the split CTV/CBC coverage of 1984–85 and 1985–86, the Canwest-Global telecasts from 1986–87-1987–88 were network exclusive, except for game seven of the Stanley Cup Final if they were necessary. When CBC and Global televised game seven of the 1987 Stanley Cup Finals, they used separate production facilities and separate on-air talent.
- Game four (May 24) of the 1988 Stanley Cup Final is well known for the fog that interfered with the game and a power outage that caused its cancellation before a faceoff. The game ended with the Edmonton Oilers and Boston Bruins tied at 3–3. CBC televised the first game four as well as game five (on May 26), for which the Oilers won 6–3.
  - In 1988, Canwest-Global had the rights to games six and seven of the Final, which ultimately were not necessary.

=== 1970s ===
Year	Network(s)	Play-by-play	Colour commentator(s)	Studio host	Studio analysts
1979	CBC	Dan Kelly; Danny Gallivan (first half of Game 2)	Dick Irvin Jr. Gary Dornhoefer (Games 1, 5); Gerry Pinder (Game 2); Bobby Orr (in New York City)	Dick Irvin Jr. and Dan Kelly (in Montreal); Dave Hodge (in New York City)	Howie Meeker (in New York City)
1978	CBC	Danny Gallivan (in Montreal); Dan Kelly (in Boston)	Chico Resch and Dick Irvin Jr.	Dick Irvin Jr. and Dan Kelly (in Montreal); Dave Hodge (in Boston)	Lou Nanne
1977	CBC	Danny Gallivan	Dick Irvin Jr. Don Marshall (Game 1); Red Storey (Game 2)	Dick Irvin Jr. and Dave Reynolds (in Montreal); Dave Hodge and Brian McFarlane (in Boston)	
1976	CBC	Danny Gallivan	Dick Irvin Jr.	Dave Hodge	Howie Meeker
1975	CBC	Danny Gallivan (Games 1–2, 6); Jim Robson (Games 3–5)	Dick Irvin Jr. (Games 1–2, 4, 6); Bill Good Jr. (Games 3, 5)	Dave Hodge; Brian McFarlane (Games 1, 3, 4, 6); Dave Reynolds (Games 2, 5)	
1974	CBC	Danny Gallivan (in Boston); Bill Hewitt (in Philadelphia)	Brian McFarlane (in Boston); Dick Irvin Jr. (in Philadelphia)	Dave Hodge and Mike Anscombe	
1973	CBC	Danny Gallivan	Dick Irvin Jr.	Dave Hodge; Ted Reynolds (Games 1, 4–6); Brian McFarlane (Games 2, 3)	
1972	CTV	Danny Gallivan (in Boston); Bill Hewitt (in New York City)	Dick Irvin Jr. (in Boston); Bob Goldham and Brian McFarlane (in New York City)	Dave Hodge and Brian McFarlane	
1971	CBC	Danny Gallivan	Scotty Bowman and Dick Irvin Jr.	Ward Cornell and Brian McFarlane	
1970	CBC	Bill Hewitt (in St. Louis); Danny Gallivan (in Boston)	Bob Goldham and Brian McFarlane (in St. Louis); Dick Irvin Jr. (in Boston)	Ward Cornell and Ted Darling	

==== Notes ====
- The most commonly seen video clip of Bobby Orr's famous overtime goal ("The Flight") in game four of the 1970 Stanley Cup Final is the American version broadcast on CBS as called by Dan Kelly. This archival clip can be considered a rarity, since about 98% of the time, any surviving kinescopes or videotapes of the actual telecasts of hockey games from this era usually emanate from CBC's coverage. According to Dick Irvin, Jr.'s book My 26 Stanley Cups (Irvin was in the CBC booth with Danny Gallivan during the 1970 Stanley Cup Finals), he was always curious why even the CBC prototypically uses the CBS replay of the Bobby Orr goal (with Dan Kelly's commentary) instead of Gallivan's call. The explanation that Irvin received was that the CBC's master tape of the game (along with others) was thrown away in order clear shelf space at the network.
- In 1972, Hockey Night in Canada moved all playoff coverage from CBC to CTV to avoid conflict with the lengthy NABET strike against the CBC. Eventually, MacLaren Advertising, in conjunction with Molson Breweries and Imperial Oil/Esso, who actually owned the rights to Hockey Night in Canada (not CBC) decided to give the playoff telecast rights to CTV. Initially, it was on a game-by-game basis in the quarterfinals (game one of the Boston-Toronto series was seen on CFTO Toronto in full while other CTV affiliates, but not all joined the game in progress. Game one of the New York Rangers–Montreal series was seen only on CFCF Montreal while game four not televised due to a lockout of technicians at the Montreal Forum), and then the full semifinals and Stanley Cup Final. Because CTV did not have 100% penetration in Canada at this time, they asked CBC (who ultimately refused) to allow whatever one of their affiliates was the sole network in that market to show the playoffs. As a result, the 1972 Stanley Cup playoffs were not seen in some of the smaller Canadian markets unless said markets were close enough to the United States border to pick up the signal of a CBS affiliate that carried games one, four, or six (games two, three, and five were not nationally broadcast in the United States).

=== 1960s ===
Year	Network(s)	Play-by-play	Colour commentator(s)	Studio host	Studio analyst(s)
1969	CBC	Danny Gallivan	Dick Irvin Jr.	Ward Cornell and Ted Darling	
1968	CBC	Danny Gallivan	Dick Irvin Jr.	Ward Cornell, Ted Darling, and Dan Kelly	
1967	CBC	Danny Gallivan (in Montreal); Bill Hewitt (in Toronto)	Dan Kelly and Dick Irvin Jr. (in Montreal); Brian McFarlane (in Toronto)	Ward Cornell and Frank Selke Jr.	Bob Goldham
1966	CBC	Danny Gallivan	Keith Dancy	Ward Cornell and Frank Selke Jr.	
1965	CBC	Danny Gallivan	Keith Dancy	Ward Cornell and Frank Selke Jr.	
1964	CBC	Bill Hewitt	Guest sportswriters (Games 1–5, 7); Keith Dancy (Game 6)	Ward Cornell and Frank Selke Jr.	
1963	CBC	Bill Hewitt		Ward Cornell and Frank Selke Jr.	
1962	CBC	Bill Hewitt		Ward Cornell and Frank Selke Jr.	Gump Worsley, Gordie Howe, and Doug Harvey
1961	CBC	Danny Gallivan (in Chicago); Bill Hewitt (in Detroit)	Keith Dancy (in Chicago); Foster Hewitt (in Detroit)	Ward Cornell and Frank Selke Jr.	
1960	CBC	Danny Gallivan (in Montreal); Bill Hewitt (in Toronto)	Frank Selke Jr. (in Montreal); Foster Hewitt (in Toronto)	Ward Cornell (in Montreal); Johnny Esaw (in Toronto)	

==== Notes ====
- The 1961 Stanley Cup Final was almost not televised in Canada at all. At that time, the CBC only had rights to the Montreal Canadiens and Toronto Maple Leafs' games; home games only during the season and all games in the playoffs. However, with both the Canadiens and Maple Leafs eliminated in the semi-finals, the CBC's worst nightmare became reality. The CBC had to conceive a way to carry the Final between the Chicago Black Hawks and Detroit Red Wings or face a public revolt. According to lore, the CBC found a way to link their Windsor viewers as having a vested interest in the Final with the across the river Red Wings. Thus, CBC was able to carry the series after inking special contracts with the Red Wings and Black Hawks as a service to the Windsor market. From Windsor, CBC linked the signal to Toronto and they relayed the coverage Canada-wide. From there, Canadians were able to see the Final with nary a glitch in the coverage.
- To accommodate the American TV coverage on NBC (1966 marked the first time that a Stanley Cup Final game was to be nationally broadcast on American network television), game one of the 1966 Stanley Cup Final was shifted to a Sunday afternoon. This in return, was the first time ever that a National Hockey League game was played on a Sunday afternoon in Montreal. While games one and four of the NBC broadcasts were televised in color, CBC carried these games and all other games in black and white.

=== 1950s ===
Year	Network(s)	Play-by-play	Colour commentator(s)	Studio host
1959	CBC	Danny Gallivan (in Montreal); Bill Hewitt (in Toronto)	Frank Selke Jr. (in Montreal); Foster Hewitt (in Toronto)	Tom Foley (in Montreal); Scott Young (Game 3); Wes McKnight (Game 4)
1958	CBC	Danny Gallivan	Frank Selke Jr.	Wes McKnight and Tom Foley
1957	CBC	Danny Gallivan	Keith Dancy	Wes McKnight
1956	CBC	Danny Gallivan	Keith Dancy	Wes McKnight
1955	CBC	Danny Gallivan	Keith Dancy	Wes McKnight
1954	CBC	Danny Gallivan	Keith Dancy	Wes McKnight
1953	CBC	Danny Gallivan	Keith Dancy	Wes McKnight

==== Note ====
- CBC's coverage of games 3–5 of the 1954 Stanley Cup Final were joined in progress at 9:30 p.m. ET (approximately one hour after start time). Meanwhile, CBC joined game six in at 10 p.m. ET (again, one hour after start time). Game seven was carried Canada-wide from opening the face-off at 9 p.m. ET. Since game seven was played on Good Friday night, there were no commercials (Imperial Oil was the sponsor for the entire broadcast).

=== Local television (Canada) ===
==== 1980s ====
Year	Network	Play-by-play	Colour commentator(s)	Studio host	Studio analyst(s)
1986	CBMT (Montreal) and CBRT (Calgary) (Games 1–2)	Don Wittman	John Davidson and Dick Irvin Jr.	Dave Hodge	Howie Meeker and Don Cherry
1985	CBXT (in Edmonton)	Don Wittman	Howie Meeker and John Davidson	Chris Cuthbert	Howie Meeker

===== Notes =====
- As previously mentioned in 1985, CBC televised Games 3–5 in Edmonton only. CTV televised Games 3–5 nationally while games were blacked out in Edmonton. Had the series gone to a Game 7, then both CBC and CTV would have televised it while using their own production facilities and crews.
- As previously mentioned in 1986, CBC only televised Games 1 and 2 in Montreal and Calgary while CTV air both games to the rest of Canada. Had the series gone to a Game 7, then both CBC and CTV would have televised it while using their own production facilities and crews. Like the year prior, Dan Kelly, Ron Reusch, and Brad Park called the games for CTV.

== French Canadian television ==
=== 2020s ===
Year	Network	Play-by-play	Colour commentator(s)
2026	TVA Sports	Félix Séguin	Patrick Lalime
2025	TVA Sports	Félix Séguin	Patrick Lalime
2024	TVA Sports	Félix Séguin	Patrick Lalime
2023	TVA Sports	Félix Séguin	Patrick Lalime
2022	TVA Sports	Félix Séguin	Alexandre R. Picard (Games 1–2); Patrick Lalime (Games 3–6)
2021	TVA Sports	Félix Séguin	Patrick Lalime
2020	TVA Sports	Félix Séguin	Patrick Lalime

=== 2010s ===
Year	Network	Play-by-play	Colour commentator
2019	TVA Sports	Félix Séguin	Patrick Lalime
2018	TVA Sports	Félix Séguin	Patrick Lalime
2017	TVA Sports	Félix Séguin	Patrick Lalime
2016	TVA Sports	Félix Séguin	Patrick Lalime
2015	TVA Sports	Félix Séguin	Patrick Lalime
2014	RDS	Pierre Houde	Marc Denis
2013	RDS	Pierre Houde	Marc Denis
2012	RDS	Pierre Houde	Marc Denis
2011	RDS	Pierre Houde (Games 1–4, 6–7); Alain Crête (Game 5)	Benoît Brunet
2010	RDS	Pierre Houde	Benoît Brunet

==== Notes ====
- Since 2015, under a sub-license agreement with Rogers, TVA has been the exclusive home of French-language broadcasts in Canada.

=== 2000s ===
Year	Network	Play-by-play	Colour commentator(s)
2009	RDS	Pierre Houde	Benoît Brunet
2008	RDS	Pierre Houde	Yvon Pedneault
2007	RDS	Pierre Houde	Yvon Pedneault
2006	RDS	Pierre Houde	Yvon Pedneault
2004	RDS	Pierre Houde	Yvon Pedneault
2004	SRC	Pierre Houde	Yvon Pedneault
2003	RDS	Pierre Houde	Yvon Pedneault
2003	SRC	Pierre Houde	Yvon Pedneault
2002	SRC	Claude Quenneville	Michel Bergeron
2001	SRC	Claude Quenneville	Michel Bergeron
2000	SRC	Claude Quenneville	Michel Bergeron

==== Notes ====
- In the 2002–03 season, RDS secured exclusive French language rights to the NHL. The deal, reached with the Canadiens and not directly with the league, was meant to ensure a consistent home for all Canadiens games; as a general-interest network, Radio-Canada cannot give up so much airtime to Canadiens games. The announcement drew the ire of, among others, then-Heritage Minister Sheila Copps, who suggested that the network would somehow be violating its conditions of licence by not airing La Soirée du hockey. In fact, there is no specific mention in the CBC's licence from the CRTC (or any other legal document governing the CBC) that the CBC's networks carry coverage of NHL games, nor that there be parity between the two networks' carriage of such games. Also, Radio-Canada soon reached an agreement to produce the Saturday night games, to remain branded La Soirée du hockey, to be simulcast on both SRC and RDS. However, for reasons that are unclear, that agreement was terminated after the 2004 playoffs. The RDS-produced replacement, Le Hockey du samedi soir, was simulcast on SRC outside Quebec, where RDS has limited distribution, through 2006.

=== 1990s ===
Year	Network	Play-by-play	Colour commentator(s)
1999	SRC	Claude Quenneville	Michel Bergeron
1998	SRC	Claude Quenneville	Gilles Tremblay
1997	SRC	Claude Quenneville	Gilles Tremblay
1996	SRC	Claude Quenneville	Gilles Tremblay
1994	SRC	Claude Quenneville	Gilles Tremblay
1994	SRC	Claude Quenneville	Gilles Tremblay
1993	SRC	Claude Quenneville	Gilles Tremblay
1992	SRC	Claude Quenneville	Gilles Tremblay
1991	SRC	Claude Quenneville	Gilles Tremblay
1990	SRC	Richard Garneau	Gilles Tremblay

=== 1980s ===
Year	Network	Play-by-play	Colour commentator(s)
1989	SRC	Richard Garneau	Gilles Tremblay
1988	SRC	Richard Garneau	Gilles Tremblay
1987	SRC	Richard Garneau	Gilles Tremblay
1986	SRC	Richard Garneau	Gilles Tremblay and Mario Tremblay
1985	SRC	René Lecavalier	Gilles Tremblay
1984	SRC	René Lecavalier	Gilles Tremblay
1983	SRC	René Lecavalier	Gilles Tremblay
1982	SRC	René Lecavalier	Gilles Tremblay
1981	SRC	René Lecavalier	Gilles Tremblay
1980	SRC	René Lecavalier	Gilles Tremblay

=== 1970s ===
Year	Network	Play-by-play	Colour commentator
1979	SRC	René Lecavalier	Gilles Tremblay
1978	SRC	René Lecavalier	Gilles Tremblay
1977	SRC	René Lecavalier	Gilles Tremblay
1976	SRC	René Lecavalier	Gilles Tremblay
1975	SRC	René Lecavalier	Gilles Tremblay
1974	SRC	René Lecavalier	Gilles Tremblay
1973	SRC	René Lecavalier	Gilles Tremblay
1973	TVA	Jacques Moreau	Gilles Tremblay
1972	SRC	René Lecavalier	Gilles Tremblay
1971	SRC	René Lecavalier	Gilles Tremblay
1970	SRC	René Lecavalier	Jean-Maurice Bailly

=== 1960s ===
Year	Network	Play-by-play	Colour commentator(s)
1969	SRC	René Lecavalier	Jean-Maurice Bailly
1965	SRC	René Lecavalier	Jean-Maurice Bailly
1965	SRC	René Lecavalier	Jean-Maurice Bailly
1965	SRC	René Lecavalier	Jean-Maurice Bailly
1965	SRC	René Lecavalier	Jean-Maurice Bailly
1964	SRC	René Lecavalier	Jean-Maurice Bailly
1963	SRC	René Lecavalier	Jean-Maurice Bailly
1962	SRC	René Lecavalier	Jean-Maurice Bailly
1961	SRC	René Lecavalier	Jean-Maurice Bailly
1960	SRC	René Lecavalier	Jean-Maurice Bailly

=== 1950s ===
Year	Network	Play-by-play	Colour commentator
1959	SRC	René Lecavalier	Jean-Maurice Bailly
1958	SRC	René Lecavalier	Jean-Maurice Bailly
1957	SRC	René Lecavalier	Jean-Maurice Bailly
1956	SRC	René Lecavalier	Jean-Maurice Bailly
1955	SRC	René Lecavalier	Jean-Maurice Bailly
1954	SRC	René Lecavalier	Jean-Maurice Bailly
1953	SRC	René Lecavalier	Jean-Maurice Bailly

==== Notes ====
- French-language broadcasts in Canada also began in 1953, with play-by-play commentator René Lecavalier and colour commentator Jean-Maurice Bailly on CBC's Télévision de Radio-Canada (SRC) division.

== American radio ==
Year	Network	Play-by-play	Color commentator(s)	Ice level reporter(s)
2026	NHL Radio/Sports USA	John Forslund	Eddie Olczyk	Billy Jaffe
2025	NHL Radio/Sports USA	John Ahlers	Brian Hayward	Billy Jaffe
2024	NHL Radio/Sports USA	John Ahlers	Brian Boucher	Billy Jaffe
2023	NHL Radio/Sports USA	John Ahlers	Brian Boucher	Billy Jaffe
2022	NHL Radio/Sports USA	John Ahlers	Joe Micheletti	Billy Jaffe
2021	NHL Radio/Sports USA	John Ahlers	Joe Micheletti	
2020	NHL Radio/Westwood One	Kenny Albert (Games 1–4, 6); Sam Rosen (Game 5)	Joe Micheletti	
2019	NHL Radio/NBC Sports Radio/Westwood One	Kenny Albert	Joe Micheletti (Games 1–4, 6–7); Darren Pang (Game 5)	Brian Boucher
2018	NHL Radio/NBC Sports Radio/Westwood One	Kenny Albert	Joe Micheletti (Games 1–4); Jim Fox (Game 5)	Ray Ferraro
2017	NHL Radio/NBC Sports Radio/Westwood One	Kenny Albert	Joe Micheletti	Ray Ferraro
2016	NHL Radio/NBC Sports Radio/Westwood One	Kenny Albert	Joe Micheletti	Darren Eliot
2008	NHL Radio	Sam Rosen	Bill Clement	
2007	NHL Radio	Sam Rosen	Darren Pang	
2006	NHL Radio	Sam Rosen	Darren Eliot	
2004	NHL Radio	Sam Rosen	Eddie Olczyk	
2003	NHL Radio	Sam Rosen	Eddie Olczyk	
2002	NHL Radio	Sam Rosen	Gary Green and Darren Eliot	
2001	NHL Radio	Sam Rosen	Gary Green	
2000	NHL Radio	Sam Rosen	Gary Green	
1999	NHL Radio	Sam Rosen	Gary Green	
1998	NHL Radio	Sam Rosen	Gary Green	Sean Grande
1997	NHL Radio	Sam Rosen	Gary Green	Doug Brown and Sean Grande
1996	NHL Radio	Sam Rosen	Gary Green	Doug Brown and Sean Grande
1995	NHL Radio	Kenny Albert	Gary Green	Doug Brown
1994	NHL Radio	Kenny Albert	Sherry Ross	Doug Brown
1993	Global Sports Network	Howie Rose	Mike Keenan	
1992	Star Communications			
1991	ABC	Don Chevrier	Phil Esposito	Fred Manfra
1990	ABC	Don Chevrier	Phil Esposito	Fred Manfra
1981	Enterprise Radio			
1978	NBC Radio			
1977	NBC Radio			

== See also ==
- List of current National Hockey League broadcasters
- National Hockey League on television
