= NHL on CTV =

Canadian sports TV program

The CTV Television Network aired National Hockey League (NHL) games from the 1965–66 to 1975–76 seasons, then the 1984–85 and 1985–86 seasons.

== History ==
=== First iteration (1965–1976) ===
CTV's involvement with the NHL began in the 1965–66 season with a series of Wednesday-night regular season games. These were produced by the McLaren ad agency, which also produced the Saturday night Hockey Night in Canada games for the CBC. As was the case with the Saturday games, they were contests (usually at home) of the Montreal Canadiens, Toronto Maple Leafs, and after 1970, the Vancouver Canucks.

On March 16, 1966, CTV's coverage of the game between the Canadiens and Maple Leafs was frequently interrupted for news updates on the Gemini 8 space mission, which had run into serious trouble after being successfully launched that morning; when the game ended, CTV joined a simulcast of CBS News coverage in time for the capsule's re-entry and splashdown.

During the 1972 Stanley Cup playoffs, Hockey Night in Canada moved all coverage from CBC to CTV to avoid conflict with the lengthy NABET strike against the CBC. Eventually, MacLaren Advertising, in conjunction with Molson Breweries and Imperial Oil/Esso, who owned the rights to Hockey Night in Canada (not CBC) decided to give the playoff telecast rights to CTV. Initially, it was on a game-by-game basis in the quarterfinals (Game 1 of the Boston–Toronto series was seen on CFTO Toronto in full while other CTV affiliates, but not all joined the game in progress. Game 1 of the New York Rangers–Montreal series was seen only on CFCF Montreal while Game 4 not televised due to a lockout of technicians at the Montreal Forum), and then the full semifinals and Stanley Cup Final. Because CTV did not have 100% penetration in Canada at this time, they asked CBC (who ultimately refused) to allow whatever one of their affiliates was the sole network in that market to show the playoffs. As a result, the 1972 Stanley Cup playoffs were not seen in some of the smaller Canadian markets unless said markets were close enough to the United States border to pick up the signal of a CBS affiliate that carried Games, 1, 4, or 6 (Games 2, 3, and 5 were not nationally broadcast in the United States).

CTV decided to pull out of midweek NHL coverage after the 1975–76 season, opening the way for local TV stations in the three Canadian cities that had NHL clubs at the time to carry mid-week telecasts of their hometown NHL clubs.

Ironically, CTV affiliate CFCF-TV in Montreal carried some local Canadiens' telecasts starting in the 1975–76 season.

=== Second iteration (1984–1986) ===
In the 1984–85 and 1985–86 seasons, the NHL returned to CTV, with regular season games on Friday nights (and some Sunday afternoons) as well as partial coverage of the playoffs and Stanley Cup Final.

While Molson continued to present Hockey Night in Canada on Saturday nights on the CBC, rival brewery Carling O'Keefe began airing Friday Night Hockey on CTV. This marked the first time in more than a decade that CBC was not the lone over-the-air network broadcaster of the National Hockey League in Canada. Carling O'Keefe initially signed a contract well into the 1984–85 season. As a result, they wanted to cram as many games as possible (beginning in February) in the brief window they had.

The deal with CTV was arranged by the Québec Nordiques (who were owned by Carling O'Keefe) and all 14 U.S.-based NHL clubs, who sought to break Molson's monopoly on NHL broadcasting in Canada. All of the CTV's regular-season telecasts originated from Quebec City or the United States, as Molson shut them out of the other six Canadian buildings (as Carling did to them in Quebec City).

1985–86's coverage did not begin until November, so as to avoid conflicts with CTV's coverage of the Major League Baseball postseason.

=== Stanley Cup playoffs coverage ===
During the 1985 Stanley Cup playoffs, CBC and Molson Brewery used a loophole in that games involving Canadian-based teams (excluding the Quebec Nordiques) in the playoffs could be televised locally by CBC. Dan Kelly and Ron Reusch called the Philadelphia-Quebec Wales Conference Final series. They also called three games at the Colisée de Quebec of the Montreal-Quebec Adams Division Final and Games 2 and 5 of the Philadelphia-New York Islanders Patrick Division Final.

For the 1986 Stanley Cup playoffs, Kelly and Reusch called game 3 of the Québec-Hartford series with Brad Park, the final three games of Washington-New York Rangers series, and the Calgary–St. Louis Campbell Conference Final series with Bobby Taylor. CTV's coverage was blacked out in Calgary, where CBC provided coverage. For the Calgary Flames–Winnipeg Jets first-round series in 1985–86, CBC, who initially had the rights to the series, ultimately passed as they were already maxed out with three other series (Montreal-Boston, Chicago-Toronto, and Edmonton-Vancouver). The rights to the Calgary-Winnipeg series were eventually sold to the CTV affiliates in Calgary (CFCN) and Winnipeg (CKY) as well as Carling O'Keefe.

In 1986, CBC only televised Games 1 and 2 in Montreal and Calgary, but televised Games 3–5 nationally. When CTV televised Games 1 and 2, both games were blacked out in Montréal and Calgary. Unlike last year, Dan Kelly, Ron Reusch, and Brad Park called the games for CTV.

After the 1985–86 season, CTV decided to pull the plug on the venture. Their limited access to Canadian-based teams (other than Quebec, whose English-speaking fan base was quite small) translated into poor ratings. For the next two years, Carling O'Keefe retained their rights, and syndicated playoff telecasts on a chain of channels that would one day become the Global Television Network under the names Stanley Cup '87 and Stanley Cup '88, before a merger between the two breweries put an end to the competition.

== NHL–Soviet Super Series ==
In addition to the NHL coverage, CTV televised a handful of games of the 1979–80, 1982–83, 1985–86, 1988–89, and 1989–90 editions of the NHL–Soviet Super Series, where touring Soviet clubs visited NHL teams in a series of exhibition games.

On New Year's Eve 1985, CTV broadcast one such game between the Montreal Canadiens and CSKA Moscow in Montreal. Although CTV aired the game (as a "Special Presentation of CTV Sports"), it was not considered an official part of NHL on CTV package. That was because the broadcast was presented by Molson instead of Carling O'Keefe. Therefore, a special on-air talent was utilized; Bob Cole, Ron Reusch, and Dick Irvin, Jr. called the game while Dan Matheson and Brian McFarlane hosted the telecast together on CTV.

== CTV's later involvement with the NHL ==
=== CTV Sportsnet's coverage ===
Sportsnet was launched on October 9, 1998 as CTV Sportsnet. The name was chosen to match the regional "Fox Sports Net" operations across the United States. CTV owned 40% and was the managing partner of the new network; Rogers, Molson, and Fox owned 20% each.

The new network gained credibility before it went on the air, wrestling the NHL Canadian cable package away from long-time holder TSN. From 1998–99 until 2001–02, Sportsnet aired Labatt Blue Tuesday Night Hockey to a national audience throughout the regular season, and covered first-round playoff series not involving Canadian teams. On the day CTV Sportsnet went on the air, its first live sports event was an NHL opening-night telecast between the Philadelphia Flyers and New York Rangers. The national cable rights have since returned to TSN, though Sportsnet retains English regional rights to five of the seven Canadian-based clubs (TSN, through regional feeds, holds regional rights to the remaining two.)

"The Hockey Song" was used to open NHL broadcasts on CTV Sportsnet in the late 1990s and early 2000s.

=== Hockey Night in Canada rumours ===
The possible movement of Hockey Night in Canada to another broadcaster caused some controversy and discussion during the 2006–2007 hockey season. CTV had outbid the CBC for Canadian television rights to the 2010 and 2012 Olympics as well as the major television package for curling. The broadcast requirements would have focused on CTV-owned TSN (The Sports Network), a cable channel that already carries Canadian NHL hockey during the week as well as other NHL games throughout the season. CTV did, however, buy out the previous theme to CBC's Hockey Night in Canada for use in TSN's broadcasts immediately after the 2007–08 NHL season.

The CBC's deal with the NHL was set to expire after the 2013–14 season. CTV parent Bell had been expected to make a joint bid for CTV and sister network TSN for all national English-language television rights to the NHL in Canada. Under such a deal, CTV would likely have carried the Saturday-night games during the regular season, weekend playoff games in the first three rounds, and the Stanley Cup Final. TSN would likely have kept midweek national cable coverage of the league and gained midweek early-round playoff games of Canadian-based teams now seen on CBC. Some midweek regular-season games could have been sub-leased to the various Rogers Sportsnet regional networks. Such a deal could also have put a few local midweek telecasts on CTV Two stations in Barrie (Toronto), Vancouver Island (Vancouver), Ottawa, Calgary, and Edmonton; along with CKY-TV Winnipeg and CFCF-TV Montreal.

But on November 26, 2013, the league announced that Rogers Communications had won all Canadian television rights to the league beginning with the 2014–15 season and extending through the 2025–26 season. While Rogers will sublease Saturday night and playoff games (including the Stanley Cup Final) to CBC, thereby keeping that network's iconic Hockey Night in Canada in place until at least the 2017–18 season. However, Rogers will take over the production of games. Rogers and CBC later renewed their partnership through the end of the 2025–26 season.

On April 2, 2025, the deal between Rogers and the NHL was renewed through the 2037-38 NHL season. However, Rogers and CBC declined to renew the Hockey Night in Canada sublicensing agreement; the CBC maintains ownership of the Hockey Night in Canada brand and stated that it would use it in "different ways", while Rogers will continue to televise the NHL on Sportsnet in the same Saturday night block without it. CTV, TSN, and their parent company will also be out of NHL coverage until at least 2038, though some TSN regional agreements with some Canadian-based teams are set to expire in 2026.

== Announcers ==
=== Play-by-play ===
- Bill Hewitt: 1972 Stanley Cup Final
- Dan Kelly: 1984–86

=== Color commentators ===
- Bob Goldham: 1972 Stanley Cup Final
- Brian McFarlane: 1972 Stanley Cup Final
- Ron Reusch: 1984–86
- Tom Watt: 1984–85
- Ed Westfall: 1984–85 (non-New York Islanders games). He was the guest color commentator and studio analyst for CTV broadcasts that did not involve the Islanders due to his involvement with SportsChannel New York for the team. He did the same for the Quebec–Philadelphia Prince of Wales Final series after the New York Islanders was eliminated. He left CTV for the Islanders broadcasts commitment full-time.

=== Studio hosts ===
- Dave Hodge: 1972 Stanley Cup Final
- Brian McFarlane: 1972 Stanley Cup Final
- Dan Matheson: 1984–86

=== Studio analysts ===
- John Garrett: 1985 playoffs (after Vancouver missed the playoffs). Garrett joined the CTV crew as a studio analyst for the Canadiens–Nordiques Adams Division Final series. He retired before the start of the 1985–86 season, left CTV in October 1985, and joined CBC the following year.
- Dave Maloney: 1985–86 season. Maloney joined the CTV crew mid-season to replace Park in the same capacity for the rest of the regular season after he left for CTV mid-season to replace fired Harry Neale as head coach of the Red Wings.
- Brad Park: 1985 playoffs (after Detroit was eliminated). Park retired from playing in the summer of 1985 and joined the CTV crew as a studio analyst and "third man" in the booth for the 1985 Stanley Cup Final and the 1985–86 season. However, he was hired mid-season to replace Harry Neale as head coach of the Detroit Red Wings, forcing him to leave CTV. He once again re-joined the crew for the 1986 playoffs, which Detroit did not qualify for.
- Bobby Taylor: 1984–86 (whenever he is not involved with the Philadelphia Flyers). He joined the CTV crew as a studio analyst and "third man" in the booth in the regular season and the playoffs for non-Flyers games and did the same in the 1986 playoffs after Philadelphia was eliminated.
