= Dick Irvin Jr. =

Canadian sports broadcaster

- Born: James Dickinson Irvin; March 4, 1932 (age 94); Calgary, Alberta, Canada
- Occupations: Sports broadcaster and author
- Father: Dick Irvin

James Dickinson Irvin III (or Dick Irvin Jr.), CM (born March 4, 1932) is a Canadian retired sports broadcaster and author. In 1988, the Hockey Hall of Fame presented him with the Foster Hewitt Memorial Award, for his contributions to hockey broadcasting. In 2004, he was inducted into the Canadian Association of Broadcasters Hall of Fame.

== Broadcasting career ==
Dick Irvin is a graduate of McGill University in Montreal, Quebec, where he obtained a Bachelor of Commerce degree from what is now the Desautels Faculty of Management. While attending university from 1951 to 1953, Irvin played for the varsity hockey team and worked part-time as an assistant to the equipment manager of the Montreal Canadiens, the team his father coached at the time.

After several years in commerce, he turned to sports broadcasting, first as a media liaison for the Canadiens and then, starting in 1966, as a colour commentator on their radio and television broadcasts, alongside play-by-play announcer Danny Gallivan. Starting in 1980, former Red Wings and Canadiens player Mickey Redmond joined the pair. From the late 1970s through the early 1980s, he acted as both the colour commentator and studio host for Hockey Night in Canada (HNIC) telecasts from Montreal. This meant that he missed the beginnings and ends of periods as he moved from ice level to the broadcast booth and back.

Gallivan often playfully addressed him as "Richard", even though his used name is a diminutive of Dickinson. After Gallivan's retirement in 1984, Irvin worked as the play-by-play announcer for Montreal regional games, as a secondary colour commentator, a "third man" in the broadcast booth, or even as a studio host in Montreal for national games. He also provided radio play-by-play commentary for Canadiens' games that were not on HNIC from 1976 until 1997 and was the radio play-by-play announcer for the Montreal Alouettes of the Canadian Football League for eight seasons.

At his retirement, he was the longest-serving member of CBC Television's Hockey Night in Canada, with a broadcasting career spanning from 1966 to 1999. Though retired, Irvin still contributes yearly to the annual "Hockey Day in Canada" broadcast, along with other occasional appearances, including Canadiens retirement ceremonies. For example, he hosted the closing ceremony at Montreal Forum along with long-time French-language broadcaster Richard Garneau on March 11, 1996, after the game against the Dallas Stars, introducing many of the former Canadiens participating in the event to pass the torch. Then, he was part of CBC's broadcast crew of the first Heritage Classic game from Commonwealth Stadium in Edmonton on November 22, 2003, as the festivities included a game between Canadiens and Edmonton Oilers alumni teams. Finally, on December 4, 2009, he and Garneau co-hosted the Montreal Canadiens centennial pre-game ceremony together, introducing many of the former Canadiens participating in the event as they arrived onto the ice. The duo also co-hosted Canadiens' player jersey retirement ceremonies during the Montreal Canadiens centennial campaign.

Irvin is a fount of hockey knowledge, having spent a lifetime in the game. His record for longevity with Hockey Night in Canada has since been surpassed by Bob Cole. Irvin was also the sports director of CFCF radio and CFCF-TV, a CTV affiliate in Montreal. He co-hosted Montreal Minor Hockey weekly with Don McGowan on CFCF.

== Honours ==
In 2013, he was appointed a Member of the Order of Canada "for his contributions to hockey as a beloved broadcaster and author, as well as for his charitable activities, to be awarded on May 7, 2014."

== Books ==
Irvin wrote six books during his broadcasting career and one after his retirement. These books are Now Back to You, Dick (1988), The Habs (1991), Behind the Bench (1993), In the Crease (1995), Tough Calls (1997) and My 26 Stanley Cups (2001).

== Personal life ==
Although known as Dick Irvin Jr., he is the third generation to be named James Dickinson Irvin, after his father and grandfather. Irvin's father, known as Dick Irvin Sr., was a noted NHL player and coach. During his broadcasting career (which only started in earnest long after his father had died) his naming suffix was usually omitted.

Irvin has two children named Doug and Nancy. His wife, Wilma, died in 2003.

== See also ==
- Notable Families in the NHL

Preceded by Keith Dancy; Brian McFarlane; Bob Goldham; Mickey Redmond and Gary Dornhoefer; Mickey Redmond and John Davidson	Canadian network television colour commentator 1967–1971 (with Brian McFarlane in 1967; called games from Montreal and Bob Goldham in 1970); 1973–1980 (with guest analysts from 1977 to 1980); 1982 (with Mickey Redmond from Long Island); 1984 (with Redmond and Gary Dornhoefer); 1986 (with Redmond and John Davidson); 1989–1994 (with Harry Neale)	Succeeded by Bob Goldham and Brian McFarlane; Mickey Redmond; Gary Dornhoefer; John Davidson; Harry Neale
