= Foster Hewitt Memorial Award =

Annual radio and television award

- Awarded for: "to recognize distinguished members of the radio and television industry who made outstanding contributions to their profession and the game during their career in hockey broadcasting."
- Location: Hockey Hall of Fame, Toronto, Ontario
- Country: Canada
- Presented by: Hockey Hall of Fame
- Reward: Glass plaque
- First award: 1984
- Currently held by: Chris Cuthbert (2026)

The Foster Hewitt Memorial Award is an annual accolade honoring ice hockey broadcasters in North America. It was named for the Canadian hockey radio broadcaster and newspaper journalist Foster Hewitt, and it has been presented every year at a media luncheon ceremony that occurs late in the year at the Hockey Hall of Fame in BCE Place, Toronto, Ontario, Canada since 1984. The winner is chosen by a committee of members composed of radio and television figures that make up the NHL Broadcasters' Association. It is given "to recognize distinguished members of the radio and television industry who made outstanding contributions to their profession and the game during their career in hockey broadcasting." Each recipient receives a glass plaque, which is put on display in the Hall of Fame's media section. The ceremony associated with the award is staged separately to the induction of players into the Hockey Hall of Fame because media honorees are not considered full inductees.

The first four winners were Fred Cusick, Foster Hewitt, Danny Gallivan and René Lecavalier in 1984. The award was given out twice in two further consecutive years to both Budd Lynch and Doug Smith in 1985 and Wes McKnight and Lloyd Pettit the following year. It has presented posthumously on four occasions, to Smith in 1985, McKnight the following year, Dan Kelly in 1989 and Bill Hewitt in 2007. Dave Strader was named the recipient in April 2017 but he died of a rare form of bile duct cancer called cholangiocarcinoma on October 1, 2017 before the ceremony to commemorate his career that was held the following month. His three children accepted the award on his behalf. It has been presented to broadcasters who have been affiliated with the CBC Television sports program Hockey Night in Canada eight times, followed by the Montreal Canadiens and the Toronto Maple Leafs on six occasions.

== Inductees ==
Key
†	Indicates posthumous award

Recipients of the Foster Hewitt Memorial Award
Year	Image	Recipient	Affiliation	Ref
1984	—	Fred Cusick	Boston	
1984	A black and white photograph of Foster Hewitt sitting on a chair in front of a desk	Foster Hewitt	Toronto	
1984	—	Danny Gallivan	Montreal	
1984	Rene Lecavalier on the right speaking to a colleague to his right on a 1947 radio program	René Lecavalier	Montreal	
1985	—	Budd Lynch	Detroit	
1985	—	Doug Smith†	Montreal	
1986	—	Wes McKnight†	Toronto	
1986	—	Lloyd Pettit	Chicago	
1987	—	Bob Wilson	Boston	
1988	—	Dick Irvin Jr.	Montreal	
1989	—	Dan Kelly†	St. Louis, CBS, Hockey Night in Canada	
1990	—	Jiggs McDonald	Atlanta, New York Islanders, Los Angeles, Fox, SportsChannel America	
1991	—	Bruce Martyn	Detroit	
1992	A side view of Jim Robson speaking to a crowd and holding a microphone in his right hand	Jim Robson	Vancouver, Hockey Night in Canada	
1993	—	Al Shaver	Minnesota	
1994	—	Ted Darling	Buffalo	
1995	—	Brian McFarlane	Hockey Night in Canada	
1996	Bob Cole looking at the camera while wearing a black baseball cap on his head and spectacles over his eyes	Bob Cole	Hockey Night in Canada	
1997	—	Gene Hart	Philadelphia	
1998	Howie Meeker in Toronto Maple Leafs uniform holding a trophy in his right hand in a black and white photograph	Howie Meeker	Hockey Night in Canada, TSN	
1999	—	Richard Garneau	Montreal	
2000	Bob Miller	Bob Miller	Los Angeles	
2001	Mike Lange at a questions and answers session in 2011	Mike Lange	Pittsburgh	
2002	Gilles Tremblay in Montreal Canadiens uniform	Gilles Tremblay	Montreal	
2003	Rod Philips wearing black sunglasses talking to a crowd on a podium with a microphone	Rod Phillips	Edmonton	
2004	Chuck Kaiton sitting in the back seat of an open top car with both his arms extended out	Chuck Kaiton	Hartford/Carolina	
2005	—	Sal Messina	New York Rangers	
2006	—	Peter Maher	Calgary	
2007	—	Bill Hewitt†	Toronto	
2008	Mike Emrick smiling while holding a microphone in his right hand	Mike Emrick	Philadelphia, New Jersey, ESPN/ABC, Fox, NBC/NBCSN, SportsChannel America, Versus	
2009	—	John Davidson	New York Rangers, Hockey Night in Canada, ESPN/ABC, Fox, MSG Network, NBC	
2010	—	Ron Weber	Washington	
2011	—	Mickey Redmond	Detroit	
2012	—	Rick Jeanneret	Buffalo	
2013	—	Harry Neale	Buffalo, Hockey Night in Canada, Toronto	
2014	—	Pat Foley	Chicago	
2015	—	Nick Nickson	Los Angeles	
2016	—	Sam Rosen	New York Rangers, Fox, ESPN	
2017	—	Dave Strader	Detroit, Florida, Phoenix, Dallas, ESPN/ABC, NHL International, NBC/NBCSN	
2018	Joe Bowen looking to the right of the camera and speaking into a microphone	Joe Bowen	Toronto	
2019	—	Jim Hughson	Vancouver, Toronto, Hockey Night in Canada, Sportsnet, TSN	
2020	—	Rick Peckham	Hartford, Tampa Bay, SportsChannel America	
2022	—	Bill Clement	Philadelphia, ESPN/ABC, NBC, SportsChannel America, Versus	
2023	—	Dan Rusanowsky	San Jose	
2024	—	Pierre Houde	Montreal, RDS	
2025	—	Daryl Reaugh	Dallas, Hartford, ESPN/ABC, Fox, Hockey Night in Canada, NBC/NBCSN, Versus	
2026	—	Chris Cuthbert	Ottawa, Toronto, Hockey Night in Canada, TSN, NBC/NBCSN, Sportsnet	

== Statistics ==
Multiple winners by Affiliation
Name	Wins
Hockey Night in Canada	9
Toronto	7
Montreal	6
ESPN/ABC	6
NBC	6
Fox	5
Detroit	4
SportsChannel America	4
Buffalo	3
Hartford	3
Los Angeles	3
Philadelphia	3
New York Rangers	3
TSN	3
Boston	2
Chicago	2
Dallas	2
Vancouver	2
Sportsnet	2

== See also ==
- Curt Gowdy Media Award
- Ford C. Frick Award
- Pete Rozelle Radio-Television Award
