= Doug Smith (sportscaster) =

Canadian sports journalist (1920 or 1921 - 1979)

- Born: 1920 or 1921; Calgary, Alberta, Canada
- Died: April 9, 1979 (aged 58); Montreal, Quebec, Canada
- Occupation: broadcaster
- Years active: 1940s–1970s
- Employer: CJAD
- Awards: Foster Hewitt Memorial Award (1985)

Doug Smith (1920 or 1921 – April 9, 1979) was a Canadian radio sportscaster who covered the Montreal Maroons and then Montreal Canadiens of the National Hockey League (NHL) in the 1930s and '40s, and later the Montreal Alouettes of the Canadian Football League (CFL), and golf. Smith was born in Calgary but moved to Montreal in 1944 from Trail, British Columbia where he started his career. In 1946, he covered the Brier's first radio broadcast on CBC Radio. Smith switched to calling football full-time in 1952 from hockey after a minor heart attack, and was replaced by Danny Gallivan. He also organized international golf matches, including the World Golfer of the Year in 1965. He later moved to Florida, but returned to broadcast Alouettes games in 1973. Smith died in 1979 after a long illness in hospital in Montreal. He received the Foster Hewitt Memorial Award and induction into the media section of the Hockey Hall of Fame in 1985. In 1983, he was named to the Canadian Football Hall of Fame.
