= Bob Cole (sportscaster) =

Canadian sportscaster (1933–2024)

Bob Cole CM
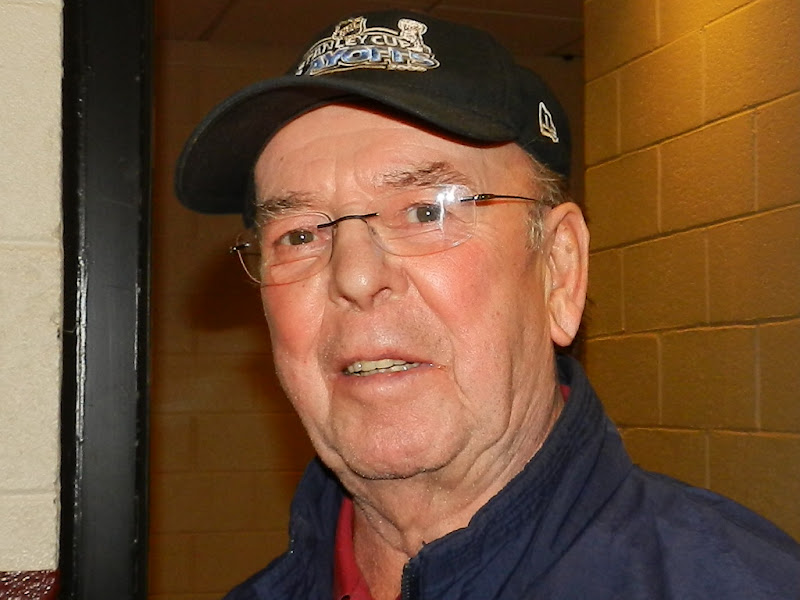
- Cole in 2012
- Born: Robert Cecil Cole; June 24, 1933; St. John's, Dominion of Newfoundland
- Died: April 24, 2024 (aged 90); St. John's, Newfoundland and Labrador, Canada
- Occupation: Hockey announcer for Hockey Night in Canada
- Years active: 1969–2019
- Awards: Foster Hewitt Memorial Award (1996)

Robert Cecil Cole CM (June 24, 1933 – April 24, 2024) was a Canadian sports television announcer who worked for CBC and Sportsnet and a competitive curler. He was known primarily for his work on National Hockey League's Hockey Night in Canada and Olympic ice hockey.

== Early life ==
Cole was born in St. John's, Newfoundland, on June 24, 1933. A knee injury suffered from playing soccer put Cole in the hospital for approximately six months as a youth. It was during this time that he would listen to Foster Hewitt calling games on the radio and developed an interest in becoming a sports announcer. In 1956, Cole made an impromptu visit to Hewitt's office to present him with an audition tape. To Cole's surprise, Hewitt welcomed him in, listened to his tape, and talked with him for two hours.

== Ice hockey ==
=== Hockey Night in Canada ===
Cole began broadcasting hockey on VOCM radio in St. John's, Newfoundland, then CBC Radio in 1969 and moved to television in 1973 when Hockey Night in Canada (HNIC) expanded its coverage. Cole was the lead play-by-play announcer for HNIC on CBC, usually working Toronto Maple Leafs games, from 1980 to 2008. Aside from the Leafs broadcasts, he was also a staple for HNIC during the annual Stanley Cup playoffs. He broadcast at least one game in every Stanley Cup Final from 1980 until 2008, after which he was replaced by Jim Hughson.

In November 2013, Rogers Communications reached a 12-year deal to become the exclusive national television and digital rightsholder for the NHL in Canada, beginning with the 2014–15 season. Although now at the age of 82, Cole told the Toronto Sun that he wanted Rogers to call and tell him if he would be a part of their hockey coverage: "I still feel the same as when I was 50. I still love what I'm doing. I just want to do games." Cole later stated, "I'd like to keep going. I feel good. I love the game. I still get passionate. I still get butterflies." In June 2014, Rogers confirmed that Cole would be part of their play-by-play team.

Sportsnet did not give any on-air assignments to Cole during the 2018 Stanley Cup playoffs. On September 27, 2018, Sportsnet announced that he would be calling his 50th and last season with Hockey Night in Canada and a limited schedule of games in the upcoming season.

On February 6, 2019, he received a video tribute and a standing ovation, during the Toronto Maple Leafs – Ottawa Senators game, on the occasion of calling his last game in Toronto, with his final play-by-play broadcast being the Toronto Maple Leafs-Montreal Canadiens game on April 6 at Bell Centre. That night, the Montreal Canadiens beat the Toronto Maple Leafs by a score of 6–5 in a shootout. This game also happened to hold historical significance, as Canadiens forward Ryan Poehling scored a hat trick and a shootout goal in what was his first NHL game. Cole's broadcasting career spanned 50 years.

=== Olympics ===
Cole's work during CBC's broadcasts of the Olympic ice hockey have also become memorable among legions of Canadians. His call on the final shot of the shootout in the semi-final game of the 1998 Winter Olympics at Nagano between Canada and the Czech Republic represented Canada's then-ongoing failure at the games and haunted fans for the next four years. With Canada scoreless in the shootout and Brendan Shanahan representing their last chance, Cole said in a panicked voice as Shanahan skated in towards Czech goalie Dominik Hasek, "He's gotta score, that's all!" But Shanahan was stopped by Hasek, prompting Cole to dejectedly say "No, he can't do it."

At the gold medal game of the 2002 Winter Olympics in Salt Lake City between Canada and the United States, Cole's animated call of Joe Sakic's second goal of the game is also one of his more memorable moments. Also, when Jarome Iginla scored Canada's fourth goal of the game, with four minutes remaining in the third period, Cole was so excited when the goal was scored he yelled out "GORE!" (a hybrid of "goal" and "score"), and then proceeded to call out "Goal, Canada! Goal! Wow! A lot of Canadian fans here! The place goes crazy here in Salt Lake City, and I guess coast to coast in Canada, and all around the world!" When Sakic scored Canada's fifth goal with 1:20 remaining, Cole yelled out "Scores! Joe Sakic scores! And that makes it 5–2 Canada! Surely, that's gotta be it!" As the final seconds of the game ticked away, and as the crowd broke out in perfect unison singing "O Canada", Cole said, "Now after 50 years, it's time for Canada to stand up and cheer. Stand up and cheer everybody! The Olympics Salt Lake City, 2002, men's ice hockey, gold medal: Canada!"

With an average Canadian audience of 10.6 million viewers, that game was the most-watched CBC Sports program, beating the previous record of 4.957 million viewers for Game 7 of the 1994 Stanley Cup Final (the final game of the 1972 Summit Series between an NHL all-star team and the Soviet Union, which had been the most-watched sports program Canadian television history, was simulcast on CBC and CTV while Cole called the game on CBC Radio), in which the New York Rangers won their first Stanley Cup in 54 years, beating the Vancouver Canucks, another moment Cole himself called: "Here comes the faceoff and blare it Manhattan! The New York Rangers have done it here on a hot June night in New York! The Rangers are Stanley Cup Champions!"

=== Colour commentators ===
Cole's long-time colour commentator on HNIC was Harry Neale, who first teamed up in the 1986–87 season. From 1987 to 2007, the pair together called 20 Stanley Cup Final series, the 1998, 2002, 2006 Winter Olympics, the 1996 World Cup of Hockey, and 2004 World Cup of Hockey for CBC. Prior to that, his usual partners included Gary Dornhoefer, Mickey Redmond, or John Davidson. Dick Irvin Jr. also often joined his broadcast team as a third man in the booth for big games. Following the departures of Neale and Irvin, Jr., his usual broadcast partners were either Garry Galley or Greg Millen.

== Curling ==
Prior to his career in broadcasting, Cole was a successful curler, playing in the 1971 and 1975 Briers as the skip for the Newfoundland team. In 1971, he led his team of Les Bowering, Ken Ellis and Alex Andrews to a 4–6 record. At the 1975 Brier, he led his team of Joseph Power Jr., Andrews and Andrew Baird to a 1–10 record. He also played in the 1965 and 1973 Canadian mixed championship, playing second for Dave Pedley in 1965 and skipping in 1973. The Pedley-led rink finished with a 4–6 record at the 1965 Mixed, and Cole led Newfoundland to a 4–6 record at the 1973 Mixed.

== Death ==
Cole died in St. John's, Newfoundland and Labrador due to natural causes on April 24, 2024; he was 90.

== Awards ==
In 2007, Cole captured his first Gemini Award in the area of Sports Play-by-Play.

Cole was honoured in the Hockey Hall of Fame in 1996 as the recipient of the Foster Hewitt Memorial Award for broadcasting excellence.

In 2022, he was named the recipient of the Academy of Canadian Cinema and Television's Lifetime Achievement Award at the 10th Canadian Screen Awards.

== Other ==
Cole received an honorary Doctorate of Laws from Memorial University of Newfoundland in St. John's in October 2002.

In early 2016, Cole had a cameo at the end of Simple Plan's album Taking One for the Team, calling a fictional hockey game involving the band; he concluded the call with, "Oh my goodness, can you believe it? Just like that, Simple Plan have won the game!".

On September 23, 2016, Cole was appointed a Member of the Order of Canada.

From 2010 to 2014, Cole was the Voice of the Republic on the CBC TV series Republic of Doyle. His voice could also be heard in the CBC 2013 TV film The Magic Hockey Skates (based on the book of the same name).

Sporting positions
Preceded by Jim Robson	Canadian network television play-by-play announcer 1981–2008 (with Don Wittman on CBC from 1985 to 1986 and Dan Kelly on CTV/Global from 1985 to 1988)	Succeeded by Jim Hughson
Preceded by Dan Kelly and Tim Ryan	American network television play-by-play announcer 1981	Succeeded by Dan Kelly
