= Daniel Matheson =

Daniel Matheson may refer to:

- Dan Matheson, Canadian journalist and news anchor
- Danny Matheson, son of Ben Matheson in the American TV series Revolution
- Daniel Matheson, owner of KCSG, a Utah TV station
- Daniel Matheson (swimmer), American swimmer who competed at the 2024 World Aquatics Swimming Championships (25 m)
