= René Lecavalier =

Canadian French-language radio show host and sportscaster

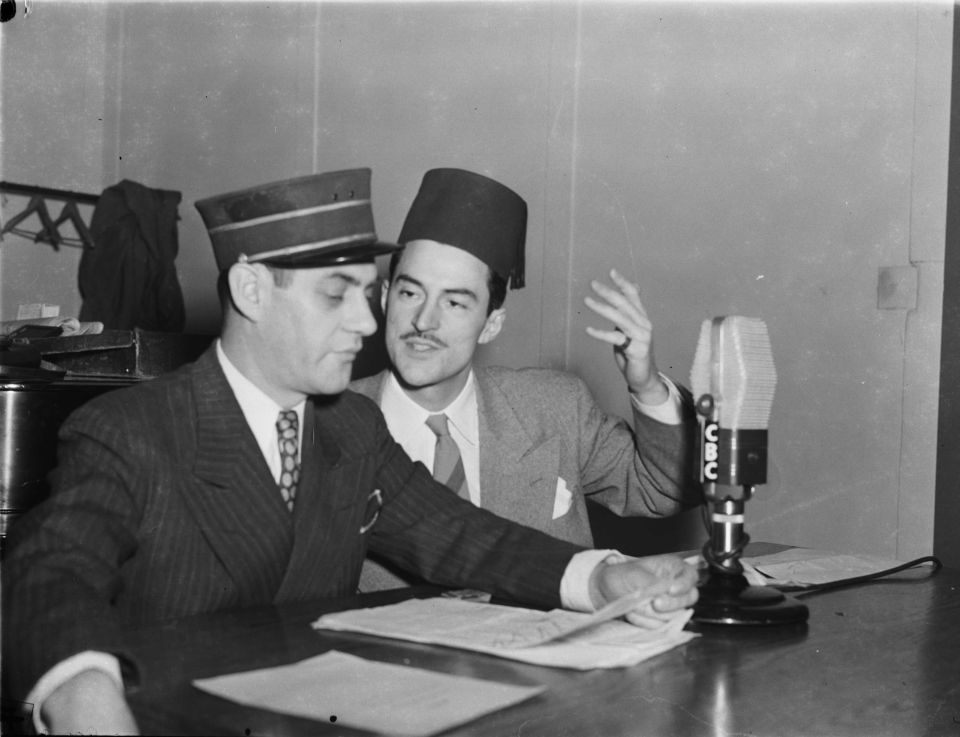
- René Lecavalier (right) talking to a colleague on the radio show "Petit train", broadcast by CBC, 1947.
- Born: July 5, 1918; Montreal, Quebec, Canada
- Died: September 6, 1999 (aged 81); Montreal, Quebec, Canada
- Occupation(s): radio and television broadcaster
- Known for: La Soirée du hockey

René Lecavalier, OC, CQ (July 5, 1918 – September 6, 1999) was a Canadian French-language radio show host and sportscaster on SRC in Quebec. During his career in radio Lecavalier won several Radiomonde Trophies. He was also the first commentator for La Soirée du hockey, the French-language version of Hockey Night in Canada. He broadcast games for the Montreal Canadiens on radio and television for over 30 years and retired in 1985. He was as revered in French Canada as Foster Hewitt was in English Canada.

Lecavalier was best known for his goal call, "Il lance… et compte!" (He shoots… and scores!)

Although Hewitt's call of Paul Henderson's goal to win the 1972 Summit Series is part of Canadian hockey lore, Lecavalier's call is equally celebrated among Francophones:

Cournoyer qui s'avance. Oh, Henderson a perdu la passe! Il a fait une chute. Et devant le but. ET LE BUT DE HENDERSON! Avec 34 secondes encore!

Rough translation: "Cournoyer moving it up the ice. Oh, Henderson lost the pass! He fell down. And in front of the net. AND HENDERSON SCORES! With 34 seconds to go!"

== Honours ==
He was made an Officer of the Order of Canada "for his substantial influence on the francization of the language of sports" in 1970 and was made a Knight of the National Order of Quebec in 1987. In 1994, he was inducted into the Canada's Sports Hall of Fame. He was awarded the Foster Hewitt Memorial Award and the Olivar-Asselin Award.
