= Budd Lynch =

American sports announcer (1917–2012)

- Born: Frank Joseph James Lynch; August 7, 1917; Windsor, Ontario, Canada
- Died: October 9, 2012 (aged 95); Dearborn, Michigan, U.S.
- Occupation: Detroit Red Wings public address announcer

Frank Joseph James "Budd" Lynch (August 7, 1917 – October 9, 2012) was the Detroit Red Wings' public address announcer at Joe Louis Arena, a position he held from 1985 to 2012. He began his career in 1949 as the team's radio play-by-play announcer. Lynch had been with the Windsor Spitfires when Red Wings' general manager Jack Adams asked him to call the games for his organization.

== Career ==
A native of Windsor, Ontario, Lynch joined the Essex Scottish Regiment of the Canadian Army during World War II. He lost his right arm during combat.

Returning home from the war, he joined the Red Wings, with the team winning the Stanley Cup during his first season. Detroit won the Stanley Cup four times during his first six years with the club. He attempted a retirement in 1975 but was brought back to the team by Alex Delvecchio as the Director of Publicity. A second retirement attempt in 1985 failed when Marian Ilitch asked Lynch to stay on as public address announcer.

His style as a public address announcer was "simply relaying information to the crowd, not to act as a cheerleader." He often regarded Gordie Howe as the greatest player he has ever seen.

In 1985, he was the recipient of the Foster Hewitt Memorial Award, presented in recognition of members of the radio and television industry who made outstanding contributions to their profession and the game during their career in hockey broadcasting as selected by the NHL Broadcasters' Association. In 1994, Lynch was inducted into the Michigan Sports Hall of Fame. In 2005, Lynch was the recipient of the Ty Tyson Excellence in Sports Broadcasting Award awarded by the Detroit Sports Media Association. Lynch is a two-time Past DSMA President and named a lifetime member. Starting in the fall of 2008, he was joined on the PA booth at Joe Louis Arena by a second PA announcer: first with John Fossen, and later with Erich Freiny, the latter of whom has succeeded Lynch at the PA announcer job permanently.

On November 5, 2009, Lynch was honored at Joe Louis Arena for the 60th anniversary of his first play-by-play television broadcast of a Red Wings game. After the ceremony, the Red Wings prevailed 2–1 over the San Jose Sharks in a shootout, and fans received Budd Lynch bobbleheads to celebrate the occasion. At the time of his death in 2012, Lynch was the longest-tenured employee in Red Wings history. His voice was so honored by fans, players and ownership alike that a recording of Lynch's voice continued to announce, "Last minute of play in this period" for each home game until Joe Louis Arena closed in 2017.

== Personal life ==
He lived in Wyandotte, Michigan, until his death on October 9, 2012. He was 95 years old.
