= Richard Garneau =

Canadian sports journalist and writer

- Born: July 15, 1930; Quebec City, Quebec
- Died: January 20, 2013 (aged 82)
- Occupations: radio and television journalist
- Known for: host of La Soirée du hockey
- Awards: Order of Canada; National Order of Quebec; Pierre de Coubertin medal

Richard Garneau, CM CQ (July 15, 1930 – January 20, 2013) was a Canadian sports journalist and writer in Quebec.

== Biography ==
Born in Quebec City, Quebec, he was best known as the host of La Soirée du hockey, the very popular ice hockey television show in French Canada. In a career spanning over 50 years, Garneau also covered twenty-three Olympic Games, seven Commonwealth Games and four Pan-American Games. He was scheduled to participate in the broadcasts of the 2014 Winter Olympic Games.

== Honours ==
In 1999, he was awarded the Foster Hewitt Memorial Award by the Hockey Hall of Fame "in recognition of his long-time work as a colour commentator on French hockey telecasts". In 2000, he was made a Knight of the National Order of Quebec. In 2005, he was made a Member of the Order of Canada. At the 2014 Sochi Winter Olympics, he was posthumously awarded the Pierre de Coubertin medal for his work in the Olympic movement.

== Selected bibliography ==
- À toi Richard qui colore avec humour la petite histoire de la radio et de la télévision au Québec (1992)
- Vie, rage... dangereux (1993)
- Les patins d'André (1994)
- Train de nuit pour la gloire (1995)
- À toi... Richard... prise deux. Un Québécois en Bavière (1996)
