= Bill Hewitt (sportscaster) =

Canadian sportscaster (1928–1996)

- Born: December 6, 1928; Toronto, Ontario, Canada
- Died: December 25, 1996 (aged 68); Port Perry, Ontario, Canada
- Occupation: Sportscaster
- Years active: 1951–1981
- Father: Foster Hewitt
- Family: W. A. Hewitt (grandfather)

Foster William Alfred Hewitt (December 6, 1928 – December 25, 1996) was a Canadian radio and television sportscaster. He was the son of hockey broadcaster Foster Hewitt and the grandson of Toronto Star journalist W. A. Hewitt.

== Playing career ==
Bill Hewitt played competitive football and hockey and competed in track & field while attending Upper Canada College in Toronto, Ontario.

== Sports broadcasting ==
Starting in his summer breaks from school, Bill Hewitt worked at CJRL in Kenora, Ontario. He was then hired as sports director of CFOS in Owen Sound, Ontario, and later held the same title at CKBB in Barrie.

In 1951, his father launched CKFH in Toronto, where Bill Hewitt became the sports director at age 23. In the mid-1950s, Hewitt began substituting on Toronto Maple Leafs hockey broadcasts when his father was given other assignments by the CBC, such as covering the Ice Hockey World Championships or Winter Olympics.

By 1958, both Hewitts were working together for Hockey Night in Canada games involving the Toronto Maple Leafs, with Bill calling the play-by-play and Foster serving as colour commentator. Beginning in 1961, Foster returned to the radio and Bill became the TV voice of the Toronto Maple Leafs. In 1981, a bloodstream infection forced Hewitt into retirement at the age of 53.

== Personal life and legacy ==
Hewitt died on December 25, 1996, and was interred in Stone Church Cemetery, east of Beaverton, Ontario.

The Hockey Hall of Fame posthumously awarded Hewitt Foster Hewitt Memorial Award in 2007.

== See also ==
- Notable families in the NHL

Preceded by Danny Gallivan	Canadian network television play-by-play announcer 1959-1964 (with Danny Gallivan in 1959-1960; Hewitt called the games in Toronto in both years); 1967 (with Danny Gallivan and Dan Kelly; Hewitt called the games from Toronto); 1970; 1972; 1974	Succeeded by Danny Gallivan; Jim Robson
