= Wes McKnight =

Canadian television and radio personality

James Wesley McKnight (March 22, 1909 – June 6, 1968) was a Canadian television and radio personality who did play-by-play for many sports broadcasts, including serving as one of the original hosts for Hockey Night in Canada telecasts and covering the CFL Toronto Argonauts for about thirty years. He also broadcast the King's Plate and the Canadian Open golf tournament.

He was born in Tottenham, Ontario. He joined CFRB-AM in Toronto in 1928 as sports director and hosted Canada's first regular sports program starting in 1932. He also became the station's program director and news and sports director in the 1940s as well as continuing as a sports commentator and host. He left the position of program director and sports director when he was appointed CFRB's station manager in 1959 until 1965 when he became vice-president and director of public relations for the station before retiring the next year.

He was elected to both the Hockey Hall of Fame (1986) and the Canadian Football Hall of Fame. He graduated from the University of Toronto. In 1968, he died of a heart attack at Sunnybrook Health Sciences Centre in Toronto at the age of 59. He is buried in York Cemetery in Toronto
