= Dan Matheson =

Canadian journalist and news anchor (born 1951)

Dan Matheson is a Canadian journalist and news anchor who formerly anchored the news during primetime hours on CTV News Channel, starting from September 2001. On November 17, 2015, his employment with CTV/Bell Media was terminated, along with scores of others.

== Biography ==
=== Early life and career ===
He began his broadcast career at CKLY in Lindsay, Ontario as a news and sports director.

=== CFTO ===
He left for CFTO in 1976, where he worked on Wide World of Sports. While still working at CFTO, he joined Canada AM where he presented sports news from 1978 until 1986. He continued on as a sports anchor, regularly contributing to Canada AM. In May 1995, he was made a co-host of Canada AM.

=== CTV ===
In 1984–85 and 1985–86, he hosted CTV's NHL broadcasts, which covered regular season games on Friday nights (and some Sunday afternoons) and partial coverage of the playoffs and Stanley Cup Final. He also hosted the network's coverage of the 1987 Canada Cup, the 1988 Winter Olympics in Calgary, the 1992 Summer Olympics in Barcelona, and the 1994 Winter Olympics in Lillehammer.

== Honors ==
He earned a 1997 Gemini Award for Best Performance by a Sports Broadcaster for an interview with hockey superstar Wayne Gretzky.
