= Keith Dancy =

Canadian hockey announcer

Keith Jules Dancy (June 30, 1929 – May 6, 2001) was a Canadian hockey announcer.

Dancy's broadcasting career began in 1945 when he was hired as an announcer at CFRB in Toronto, Ontario. Later, he became the play-by-play man for the Montreal Canadiens.

He was a color commentator on Hockey Night in Canada from 1952 to 1966, mostly calling games involving the Montreal Canadiens. He was a color commentator for ten Stanley Cup Final broadcasts, including CBC's first eight, along with his partner Danny Gallivan at Hockey Night in Canada, and the pair also was in the booth for eight National Hockey League All-Star Games.

After his sportscasting career ended, he became president of Rogers Broadcasting. He later launched his own company in the Niagara Region, owning and operating CFLZ-FM and CJRN in Niagara Falls and CKEY-FM in Fort Erie until his death. He died in hospital at Niagara-on-the-Lake, Ontario in 2001 at the age of 71 from cancer.
