= Foster Hewitt =

Canadian radio broadcaster (1902–1985)

Foster William Hewitt
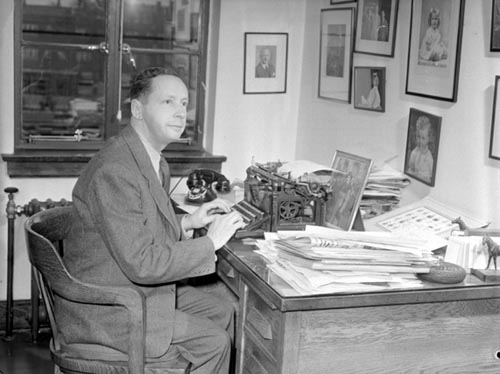
- Foster Hewitt, 1945
- Born: November 21, 1902; Toronto, Ontario, Canada
- Died: April 21, 1985 (aged 82); Scarborough, Ontario, Canada
- Occupation: Radio broadcaster
- Known for: Hockey Night in Canada
- Children: 2, including Bill Hewitt
- Father: W. A. Hewitt
- Awards: Order of Canada

Foster William Hewitt (November 21, 1902 – April 21, 1985) was a Canadian radio broadcaster, most famous for his commentating on Hockey Night in Canada. He was the son of W. A. Hewitt and the father of Bill Hewitt.

== Early life and early career ==
Born in Toronto, Ontario, Hewitt attended Upper Canada College and the University of Toronto, where he was a member of the Toronto chapter of the Beta Theta Pi fraternity. He was a champion boxer in his student years, winning the intercollegiate title at 112 pounds.

Hewitt developed an early interest in the radio and as a teenager accompanied his father, W. A. Hewitt, on a trip to Detroit, Michigan, to see a demonstration of radio technology sponsored by General Electric.

He took a job with Independent Telephone Company, which manufactured radios, and left that job and university when his father—the sports editor of the Toronto Daily Star—told him that the Star was going to start its own radio station. Hewitt became a reporter at the paper, and was ready to go on the air when CFCA was launched. CFCA's first hockey broadcast was on February 8, 1923, although it was his colleague Norman Albert who commentated. Hewitt's first broadcast likely was February 16, covering a game between the Toronto Argonauts and the Kitchener Greenshirts. Hewitt recalled the date as being March 22 in his own book, although there was no game scheduled for that night at the Arena Gardens. Hewitt's book also mentioned his first broadcast as being of a game between Parkdale and Kitchener, and the Argonaut Club was based in Parkdale, a neighbourhood of Toronto. He also mentioned that game as going into overtime, which the Argonaut-Kitchener game did.

On May 24, 1925, Hewitt and his father made what has been called the world's first broadcast of a horse race. In 1927, he was invited as guest announcer to broadcast the first game from the new Detroit Olympia.

Hewitt was part of the opening night ceremonies for Maple Leaf Gardens on November 12, 1931, and the specially designed broadcast "gondola" where Hewitt broadcast from was brought into the plans with his input.

== Hockey Night in Canada ==
For forty years, Hewitt was Canada's foremost hockey play-by-play broadcaster for the General Motors Canada, then later Imperial Oil, Hockey Broadcast on Saturday nights. As the show was aired on Canadian national radio, Hewitt became notable for the phrase "He shoots, he scores!", as well as his sign-on at the beginning of each broadcast, "Hello, Canada, and hockey fans in the United States and Newfoundland." (Note: The Dominion of Newfoundland did not join the Canadian Confederation until March 31, 1949. Newfoundland was a separate Dominion of the British Empire from 1907 to 1949.)

Foster saying "He Shoots! He Scores!!"

Hockey Night in Canada broadcasts from Toronto (aired on local station CFRB as well as successively CNR Radio, the Canadian Radio Broadcasting Commission, and ultimately CBC Radio) were simulcast on CBC Television from 1952 until 1963, with Hewitt handling the play-by-play until October 11, 1958, when he handed the duties over to his son, Bill Hewitt. He provided colour commentary of the Saturday night games after that, while continuing radio play-by-play of weeknight games. After 1963, Foster was solely on radio while Bill worked on television.

In 1951, he started his own radio station in Toronto, CKFH, initially at 1400 kHz, until moving to 1430 in 1959. The station carried Toronto Maple Leafs games until losing the rights in 1978. In 1981, the station was sold to Telemedia and was renamed CJCL. He made a bid at purchasing CHIN in 1970.

== Later life ==
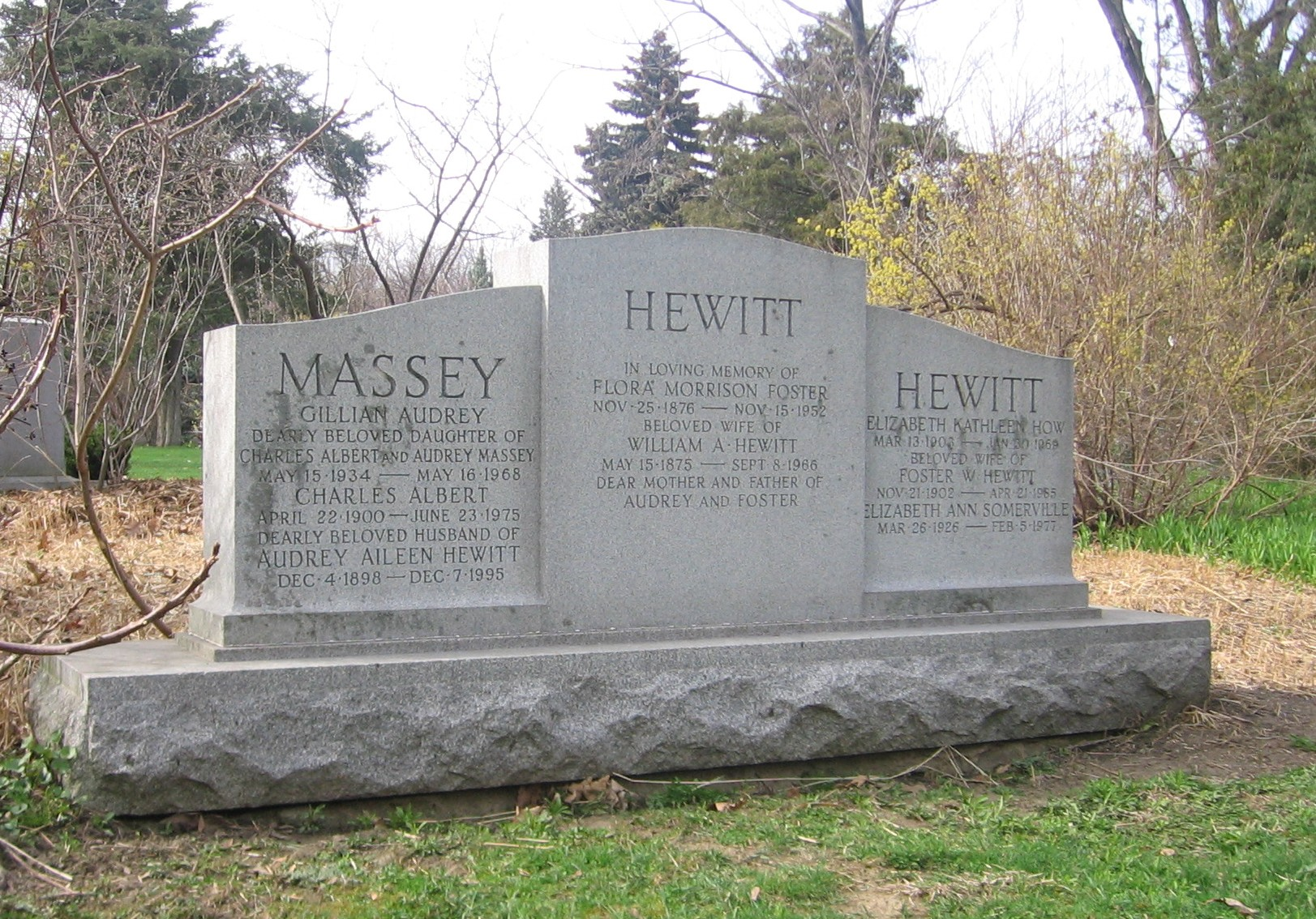
The Hewitt family tombstone, with W.A. in the centre and Foster to the right, in Mount Pleasant Cemetery

In 1965, Hewitt became one of a group of owners of the WHL Vancouver Canucks, a minor league professional hockey team. The following year, he and co-owner Cyrus McLean made a presentation to the National Hockey League asking the league to award them an NHL franchise, but their bid was rejected.

Hewitt came out of retirement to broadcast the 1972 Summit Series (with colour commentator Brian Conacher).

Hewitt was inducted into the Hockey Hall of Fame as a builder in 1965. In 1972, he was made an Officer of the Order of Canada. Hewitt's original gondola from Maple Leaf Gardens was dismantled, then dumped into an incinerator in August 1979 to make room for private boxes, under the Maple Leaf Sports & Entertainment leadership of Harold Ballard.

== Publications ==
- Down the ice; hockey contacts and reflections. Saunders. 1934.
- He shoots, he scores!. Thomas Allen. 1949.
- Hello, Canada and hockey fans in the United States. Thomas Allen. 1950.
- Along Olympic road. Ryerson Press. 1951.
- Hockey night in Canada : the Maple Leafs' story. Ryerson Press. 1953.
- Foster Hewitt: his own story. Ryerson Press. 1967.

== Personal life and death ==
Hewitt and his wife Elizabeth Kathleen How had a son, Bill, and two daughters.

Foster Hewitt died from a combination of Alzheimer's disease, kidney failure, and throat cancer on April 21, 1985, at the age of 82, at Providence Villa Nursing Home in Scarborough, Ontario.

== Legacy ==
The Foster Hewitt Memorial Award from the Hockey Hall of Fame is named after him, as is the media gondola at the nearby Scotiabank Arena.

Foster Hewitt was posthumously inducted into the Canadian Association of Broadcasters Hall of Fame in 1989 and the Ontario Sports Hall of Fame in 1996.

A Canadian-style pub and grill restaurant was established in his name in Kaohsiung, Taiwan.

== See also ==
- Notable families in the NHL

== Notes ==
Preceded by Frank Selke Jr.	Canadian network television color commentator 1959-1960 (with Frank Selke Jr.; Hewitt called the games from Toronto in both years	Succeeded by Keith Dancy
