= Mickey Redmond =

Canadian ice hockey player, broadcaster (born 1947)

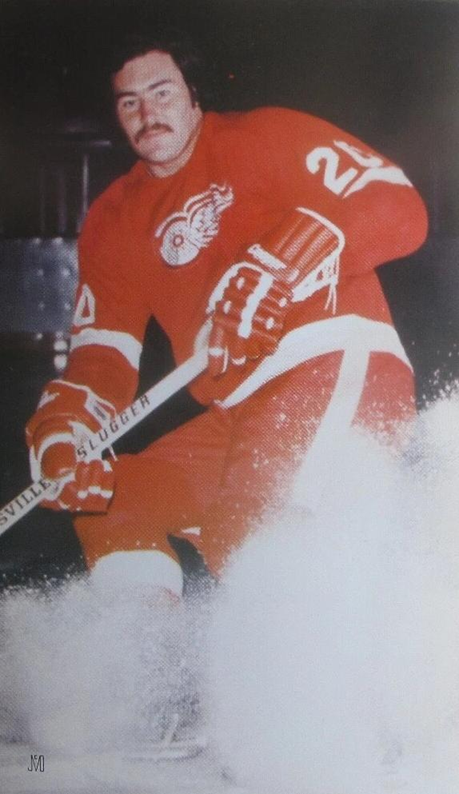
- Born: December 27, 1947 (age 78) Kirkland Lake, Ontario, Canada
- Height: 5 ft 11 in (180 cm)
- Weight: 170 lb (77 kg; 12 st 2 lb)
- Position: Right wing
- Shot: Right
- Played for: Montreal Canadiens; Detroit Red Wings
- National team: Canada
- Playing career: 1967–1975

Michael Edward "Mickey" Redmond (born December 27, 1947) is a Canadian former professional hockey player. He is currently a color commentator for Detroit Red Wings games on television for Detroit SportsNet.

== Playing career ==
Redmond played right wing for the Montreal Canadiens from 1967-1971, winning Stanley Cups with them in 1968 and 1969. He scored 27 goals for the Canadiens in the 1969–70 season.

Halfway through the 1970–71 NHL season he was traded to the Red Wings in a deal that sent superstar Frank Mahovlich to Montreal. His promise was fulfilled the season following, when he scored 42 goals on a line centered by veteran star Alex Delvecchio.

In 1972–1973, Redmond became the seventh player in NHL history and the first Red Wing player to score 50 goals in a season. He finished a career year with 52 goals (surpassing Gordie Howe's team record of 49) and 93 points. Redmond's record would stand until John Ogrodnick tallied 55 goals during the 1985 season. Delvecchio retired early in the 1973–74 season to become the team's coach, and Redmond was moved onto a line with budding superstar Marcel Dionne. Redmond's success continued, and he became only the third player (after Bobby Hull and Phil Esposito) to achieve back-to-back 50 goal seasons with 51 goals (including an NHL leading 21 power play goals).

In the 1974–75 season Redmond sustained a back injury and played only 29 games. His back woes continued the following year; after 37 games he retired early at the age of 28. He had been named to the league's First All-Star Team in 1973, the Second Team in 1974, and he played in one All-Star Game in 1974.

Redmond's younger brother Dick was an NHL defenseman. He played thirteen seasons, primarily with the Chicago Blackhawks and the Boston Bruins.

== Career statistics ==
=== Regular season and playoffs ===
			Regular season					Playoffs
Season	Team	League	GP	G	A	Pts	PIM	GP	G	A	Pts	PIM
1963–64	Peterborough Petes	OHA	53	21	17	38	26	4	1	2	3	2
1964–65	Peterborough Petes	OHA	52	23	20	43	30	12	1	9	10	11
1965–66	Peterborough Petes	OHA	48	41	51	92	31	6	4	1	5	6
1966–67	Peterborough Petes	OHA	48	51	44	95	44	6	2	5	6	14
1966–67	Houston Apollos	CHL	—	—	—	—	—	5	3	2	5	2
1967–68	Montreal Canadiens	NHL	41	6	5	11	4	2	0	0	0	0
1967–68	Houston Apollos	CHL	15	9	8	17	9	—	—	—	—	—
1968–69	Montreal Canadiens	NHL	65	9	15	24	12	14	2	3	5	2
1969–70	Montreal Canadiens	NHL	75	27	27	54	61	—	—	—	—	—
1970–71	Montreal Canadiens	NHL	40	14	15	29	35	—	—	—	—	—
1970–71	Detroit Red Wings	NHL	21	6	8	14	7	—	—	—	—	—
1971–72	Detroit Red Wings	NHL	78	42	29	71	34	—	—	—	—	—
1972–73	Detroit Red Wings	NHL	76	52	41	93	24	—	—	—	—	—
1973–74	Detroit Red Wings	NHL	76	51	26	77	14	—	—	—	—	—
1974–75	Detroit Red Wings	NHL	29	15	12	27	18	—	—	—	—	—
1975–76	Detroit Red Wings	NHL	37	11	17	28	10	—	—	—	—	—
NHL totals			538	233	195	428	219	16	2	3	5	2

=== International ===
Year	Team	Event	GP	G	A	Pts	PIM
1972	Canada	SS	1	0	0	0	0

== Broadcasting ==
After his playing career ended, Redmond became a color commentator on television. His television stops include CBC's Hockey Night in Canada, NHL on ESPN usually with Dan Kelly, Mike Lange, or Sam Rosen, NHL on Fox and for most of his broadcasting career, local television coverage of the Red Wings with play-by-play announcers Dave Strader, Mike Goldberg, and (currently) Ken Daniels. His catchphrases are referred to by fans as "Mickeyisms".

Redmond was a frequent guest on Drew and Mike In the Morning on WRIF. Redmond provided in-studio pre- and post-game commentary for WXYZ when ABC broadcast NHL games that featured the Red Wings and he did the same on NBC-broadcast Wings games for WDIV.

Currently, Redmond only does commentary on Detroit SportsNet for home games and away games requiring only short trips, due to having coeliac disease, being a two-time lung cancer survivor and having a lot of difficulty of finding gluten-free meals over an extended road trip. In those cases, his duties are typically covered by Chris Osgood and/or Larry Murphy.

In 2011, Redmond was the recipient of the Hockey Hall of Fame's Foster Hewitt Memorial Award, named after Foster Hewitt and presented by the Hockey Hall of Fame to members of the radio and television industry who make outstanding contributions to their profession and the game of ice hockey during their broadcasting career. The award winners are selected by the NHL Broadcasters Association.

In 2022, Redmond was inducted into the Michigan Sports Hall of Fame in Detroit.

== See also ==
- List of people diagnosed with coeliac disease

Preceded by Ted Harris	Detroit Red Wings captain 1974	Succeeded by Larry Johnston
