= Bob Goldham =

Canadian ice hockey player and broadcaster (1922-1991)

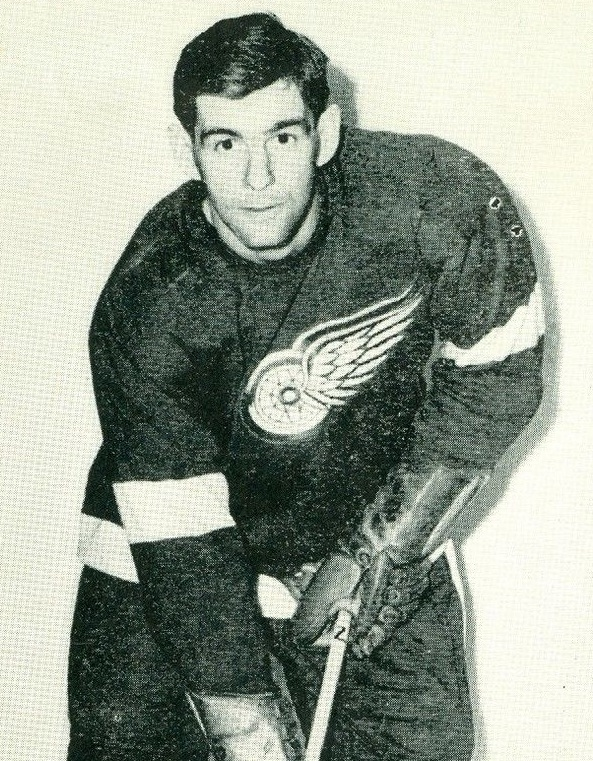
- Goldham in the 1950s
- Born: May 12, 1922 Georgetown, Ontario, Canada
- Died: September 6, 1991 (aged 69) Toronto, Ontario, Canada
- Height: 6 ft 2 in (188 cm)
- Weight: 195 lb (88 kg; 13 st 13 lb)
- Position: Defence
- Shot: Right
- Played for: Toronto Maple Leafs; Chicago Blackhawks; Detroit Red Wings
- Playing career: 1941–1956

Robert John "Golden Boy" Goldham (May 12, 1922 – September 6, 1991) was a Canadian ice hockey defenceman and broadcaster. He played two seasons for the Toronto Marlboros earning the name "Golden Boy". He was later called the "Second Goalie" because his fearless skills blocking the puck.

== Playing career ==
Goldham started his National Hockey League career with the Toronto Maple Leafs in 1941 after playing for the Hershey Bears in the AHL. He would return to the AHL after the 1942 Stanley Cup win to play on the AHL 2nd All–Star Team.

Goldham served in the Royal Canadian Navy from 1942 through 1945. After the Second World War he returned to the Toronto Maple Leafs until 1947 when he was traded with four other Leafs to the Chicago Black Hawks for Max Bentley and Cy Thomas.

In 1950, Goldham was traded to the Detroit Red Wings earning their Assistant Captain position in 1952 and would retire after the 1956 season. In 1955, he was a member of the NHL 2nd All-Star Team and won five Stanley Cups in his career in 1942, and 1947 with Toronto and 1952, 1954, and 1955 with Detroit.

Goldham played in the following NHL All-Star Games: 1942, 2nd All Star Team AHL. NHL 1947, 1949, 1950, 1952, 1954 and 2nd All Star Team 1955.

Goldham coached the Toronto St. Michael's Majors during the 1959–60 season, then resigned and was succeeded by Father David Bauer.

== Post-playing Career ==
After retiring, he worked for several years as a TV color commentator/studio analyst on Hockey Night in Canada on CBC and on the local midweek Toronto Maple Leaf broadcasts on Hamilton's CHCH-TV channel 11. Goldham was known as the First Little NHLer founded by Gordon Alcott in 1936, to make the NHL.

He was married to Eleanor, and they had three daughters: Patricia, Susan and Barbara. He died from stroke on September 6, 1991, at 69.

In 2015, he was posthumously inducted into the Canada's Sports Hall of Fame.

== Career statistics ==
			Regular season					Playoffs
Season	Team	League	GP	G	A	Pts	PIM	GP	G	A	Pts	PIM
1938–39	Toronto Ostrander Jewels	TMHL	1	0	0	0	0	—	—	—	—	—
1939–40	Northern Vocationals	Big 10 Jr. B	9	8	8	16	12	4	2	2	4	11
1939–40	Toronto Ostrander Jewels	TMHL	1	0	0	0	5	—	—	—	—	—
1939–40	Toronto Marlboros	OHA-Jr.	19	11	11	22	9	8	3	4	7	30
1940–41	Toronto Marlboros	OHA-Jr.	14	13	9	22	55	12	11	13	24	22
1941–42	Washington Lions	AHL	1	0	0	0	0	—	—	—	—	—
1941–42	Hershey Bears	AHL	34	7	10	17	44	—	—	—	—	—
1941–42	Toronto Maple Leafs	NHL	19	4	7	11	25	13	2	2	4	31
1942–43	Toronto Navy	OHA-Sr.	12	1	6	7	29	—	—	—	—	—
1942–43	Victoria Navy	BCDHL	—	—	—	—	—	3	0	3	3	2
1943–44	Cornwallis Navy	NSDHL	8	6	9	15	9	—	—	—	—	—
1943–44	Toronto Ostrander Jewels	TMHL	1	0	0	0	5	—	—	—	—	—
1943–44	Cornwallis Navy	AC	—	—	—	—	—	11	4	7	11	12
1944–45	Cornwallis Navy	NSSHL	12	2	9	11	4	2	0	1	1	4
1945–46	Toronto Maple Leafs	NHL	49	7	14	21	44	—	—	—	—	—
1946–47	Toronto Maple Leafs	NHL	11	1	1	2	10	—	—	—	—	—
1947–48	Pittsburgh Hornets	AHL	7	0	5	5	16	—	—	—	—	—
1947–48	Chicago Black Hawks	NHL	38	2	9	11	38	—	—	—	—	—
1948–49	Chicago Black Hawks	NHL	60	1	10	11	43	—	—	—	—	—
1949–50	Chicago Black Hawks	NHL	67	2	10	12	57	—	—	—	—	—
1950–51	Detroit Red Wings	NHL	61	5	18	23	31	6	0	1	1	2
1951–52	Detroit Red Wings	NHL	69	0	14	14	24	8	0	1	1	8
1952–53	Detroit Red Wings	NHL	70	1	13	14	32	6	1	1	2	2
1953–54	Detroit Red Wings	NHL	69	1	15	16	50	12	0	2	2	2
1954–55	Detroit Red Wings	NHL	69	1	16	17	14	11	0	4	4	4
1955–56	Detroit Red Wings	NHL	68	3	16	19	32	10	0	3	3	4
NHL totals			650	28	143	171	400	66	3	14	17	53
