= Danny Gallivan =

Canadian sportscaster (1917–1993)

- Born: Daniel Leo Gallivan; April 11, 1917; Sydney, Nova Scotia, Canada
- Died: February 25, 1993 (aged 75); Montreal, Quebec, Canada
- Occupations: Radio and television sportscaster
- Years active: 1946–1984

Daniel Leo Gallivan (April 11, 1917 – February 25, 1993) was a Canadian radio and television broadcaster and sportscaster.

== Early life ==
Born in Sydney, Nova Scotia, Gallivan was an avid athlete and was a baseball pitcher on the St. Theresa's parish team from Sydney that won the Maritime Intermediate Baseball Championship in 1937. Gallivan started the deciding game against the Pugwash Maple Leafs in the best-of-three series and pitched a three-hit gem while striking out 11 batters in the game.

In 1938, Gallivan was invited to a New York Giants training camp as a power pitcher, but an early injury to his arm ended any thoughts of a major league career.

Gallivan began his broadcast career at a local radio station in Antigonish, Nova Scotia, while attending St. Francis Xavier University. While at St. Francis Xavier, he was once roommates with Hollywood film director Daniel Petrie around 1940 or 1941. He taught high school algebra and Latin in Antigonish following graduation and took a stint in the Canadian Army before returning to continue his broadcasting career.

During the summers Gallivan worked in the blast furnace department of the steel plant at Dosco, a Sydney-based manufacturer of steel, coal and assorted products, to pay his way through school. His late father, Luke, was a Dosco employee for 58 years and was a foreman at International Piers, Sydney. Gallivan graduated from St. FX in 1942. Following overseas service with the Knights of Columbus Hostel Auxiliary Services in the war, Gallivan returned to Antigonish as a sportscaster for CJFX.

== Hockey Night in Canada ==
In 1946, Gallivan moved to a radio station in Halifax where he became sports director and voice of the St. Mary's junior hockey team. He was spotted by a CBC producer of Hockey Night in Canada while in Montreal to broadcast a junior hockey playoff between Halifax and Montreal and was asked to fill in for a sick announcer in 1950.

In 1952, Gallivan began a 32-year stint with Hockey Night in Canada, mostly calling games involving the Montreal Canadiens, before retiring after the 1983–84 season. Immediately after Bill Hewitt was forced to retire in 1981, Gallivan motored to Toronto to announce mid-week Maple Leaf games during the 1981–82 season – he announced the night when Rick Vaive scored his 50th goal of the season, a first in Maple Leaf history. Gallivan did play-by-play for at least 1,900 regular season and playoff matches, including 16 Stanley Cup victories for the Canadiens. His colour commentator for 18 years was Dick Irvin Jr., from 1966 until his retirement in 1984. From 1980 to 1984, Mickey Redmond joined the pair as the third man in the broadcast booth.

On October 9, 1970, he had the distinction of announcing the Vancouver Canucks' first-ever game in the NHL, a 3–1 loss to the Los Angeles Kings on CKNW radio.

== "Gallivanisms" ==
Gallivan was known for his colourful descriptions of action on the ice. Hard shots became "cannonading drives"; saves were "scintillating", "larcenous" or "enormous" rather than merely spectacular, and after a save the puck tended to get caught in a goalie's "paraphernalia" (goalie equipment). If the goaltender made a fantastic or impossible save, he would refer to it as a "hair raising save" or that the goalie "kicked out his pad in rapier-like fashion" to foil a "glorious scoring opportunity".

He would use words such as "anemic" to describe an ineffective offence or powerplay. He also coined phrases like "nowhere near the net" when a shot would go wide, and commented that "there has not been a multitudinous amount of shots" to describe a game with a "dire dearth" of shots on net. Passes from the corner and through the crease area would always feature Gallivan shouting "centred right out in front!!". Players were also known to "dipsy-doodle" with the puck or come out of their own zone "rather gingerly".

Gallivan would comment that late in the game was an "inopportune time" for a team to take a penalty, would mention that a penalty killer was "wasting valuable seconds in the penalty" when he was ragging the puck, and would almost always announce, "and the penalty has expired!" at the end of a penalty.

When a university professor wrote to Gallivan protesting that there was no such word as "cannonading", Gallivan wrote back: "There is now."

The ultimate Gallivanism was another word he coined: the "spinarama," which described a player evading a check or deking a defender with a sudden 180- or 360-degree turn. Its chief practitioner was Montreal Canadien Serge Savard so that the move was also known as "The Savardian Spinarama". The Canadian Oxford Dictionary now includes an entry for "spinarama".

== Later life ==
Gallivan retired after the 1984 Stanley Cup playoffs when a severe illness rendered him blind in one eye. He was active in retirement, working with several charities, and was the recipient of several television/broadcast industry awards. He made a cameo appearance in the 1975 Canadian feature film The Million Dollar Hockey Puck. Gallivan also had a cameo as the voice of sportcaster Ferlin Fielddigger in the 1981 animated TV special, The Raccoons on Ice.

== Death ==
According to a Canadian Press report, Gallivan died on Thursday, February 25, 1993, in his sleep at his Montreal apartment, where he lived alone. The obituary said heart failure, possibly brought on by bronchitis, was the apparent cause. He was 75 years old.

== Personal and legacy ==
Gallivan was married to Mary "Eileen" Gallivan (née MacPhee, 1925–1981) of Prince Edward Island, until her death three years prior to his final year on Hockey Night in Canada in 1984. In the early 1940s, Eileen transferred from UPEI to St. Francis Xavier University in Antigonish where she eventually met Gallivan. Together they had four children: a son Danny Jr., and daughters Pat, Paula and Susan.

In the mid-1950s, Gallivan was known to assist with the Department of Education's Physical Fitness Division's annual hockey school in PEI, along with NHL chief referee Red Storey and NHL star Buddy O'Connor.

Cape Breton University awards the Danny Gallivan Memorial Fund Bursary in his honour, and St. Francis Xavier University awards an annual scholarship in his name. The Danny Gallivan Golf Tournament was created by Gallivan, Red Storey and a group of Halifax businessmen 30 years ago to raise research funds for the fight against cystic fibrosis. It continues to be one of the longest-standing, and most successful fundraising events of its nature in Atlantic Canada. The Tournament has raised nearly $1,400,000 for cystic fibrosis.

== Tribute ==
Upon learning of Gallivan's death, NHL Commissioner Gary Bettman issued the following statement, "I join with hockey fans throughout the world, and particularly the millions in Canada whose lives were touched by Danny Gallivan, in expressing the NHL's sadness at the loss of a broadcast legend."

== Honours and awards ==
- 1974 - ACTRA Sportscaster of the Year Award
- 1980 - Nova Scotia Sport Hall of Fame - builder category
- 1984 - Hockey Hall of Fame Media Honouree
- 1985 - St. Francis Xavier University bestowed upon him an honorary Doctor of Laws Degree
- 1989 - Inducted into Canadian Sports Hall of Fame
- 1990 - Broadcast Recognition Award - Atlantic Broadcasters' Association, in acknowledging Danny's contribution to the broadcast industry
- 1991 - Canadian Association of Broadcasters Hall of Fame

2015 - Inducted into the inaugural class of the Maritime Sport Hall of Fame, (Builder category)

Preceded by First	Stanley Cup Final Canadian network television play-by-play announcer 1954-1961; 1965-1979 (with Bill Hewitt in 1959, 1960, and 1967, Jim Robson in 1975 and Dan Kelly in 1978 and 1979	Succeeded by Bill Hewitt; Dan Kelly
