= Heritage Classic =

Heritage Classic may refer to:

== Ice hockey ==
- NHL Heritage Classic, a series of outdoor games in Canada
  - 2003 Heritage Classic, held in Edmonton
  - 2011 Heritage Classic, held in Calgary
  - 2014 Heritage Classic, held in Vancouver
  - 2016 Heritage Classic, held in Winnipeg
  - 2019 Heritage Classic, held in Regina
  - 2022 Heritage Classic, held in Hamilton
  - 2023 Heritage Classic, held in Edmonton
  - 2026 Heritage Classic, held in Winnipeg

== Other uses ==
- Heritage Classic, a PGA Tour golf event now known as the RBC Heritage
- Heritage Classic (PGA Tour of Australasia)
- Heritage Classic, a label used by Harley-Davidson in its Softail line of motorcycles

== See also ==
- NHL outdoor games
