= 2026 NHL Heritage Classic =

Ice hockey game in Winnipeg, Manitoba

	1	2	3	Total
Montreal Canadiens	0	2	0	2
Winnipeg Jets	0	0	1	1
- Date: October 25, 2026
- Arena: Princess Auto Stadium
- City: Winnipeg
- Attendance: 32,342

The 2026 NHL Heritage Classic (branded as the 2026 Tim Hortons NHL Heritage Classic for sponsorship reasons) was an outdoor regular season National Hockey League (NHL) game. The eighth game in the Heritage Classic series took place on October 25, 2026 at Princess Auto Stadium in Winnipeg, Manitoba, Canada, with the Winnipeg Jets hosting the Montreal Canadiens.

== Background ==
The 2026 Heritage classic was first leaked by the NHL listing the information on its website without any prior announcement on December 4th 2025. It was taken down roughly half an hour after appearing. Two days later on December 6th it was formally announced that Winnipeg would be hosting the Eighth Heritage Classic.

This was Winnipeg's second time hosting the Heritage Classic, having previously hosted in 2016 against the Edmonton Oilers. For the Jets this was their third appearance, as they also played against the Calgary Flames in 2019 at a neutral site in Saskatchewan.

This is the third time the Canadiens played in the Heritage Classic, also having played against the Oilers and Flames in 2003 and 2011 respectively. They have appeared in two other outdoor games, the 2016 Winter Classic hosted by the Boston Bruins and the NHL 100 Classic for the NHL's centennial hosted by the Ottawa Senators in 2017.

The NHL also announced an Alumni game on January 20, 2026, taking place one day before the event on October 24.

Image from the first period

== Game summary ==
October 25	Calgary Flames	2–1	Winnipeg Jets	Princess Auto Stadium	Recap

Scoring summary
Period	Team	Goal	Assist(s)	Time	Score
1st	None				
2nd	MTL	Lane Hutson (3)	Noah Dobson (3) and Cole Caufield (3)	07:19	1–0 MTL
2nd	MTL	Kaiden Guhle (2)	Cole Caufield (4) and Juraj Slafkovsky (6)	11:04	2–0 MTL
3rd	WPG	Isak Rosen (1)	Gabriel Vilardi (5) and Haydn Fleury (1)	15:24	2–1 MTL

Number in parentheses represents the player's total in goals or assists to that point of the season

Penalty summary
Period	Team	Player	Penalty	Time	PIM
1st	MTL	Alexandre Carrier	Interference	16:14	2:00
2nd	MTL	Alex Newhook	High-sticking	12:53	2:00
3rd	MTL	Alex Newhook	Tripping	05:08	2:00
3rd	MTL	Josh Anderson	Tripping	18:28	2:00

Shots by period
Team	1	2	3	Total
Montreal	8	7	6	21
Winnipeg	10	11	14	35

Power play opportunities
Team	Goals/Opportunities
Montreal	0/0
Winnipeg	0/4

Three star selections
	Team	Player	Statistics
1st	MTL	Jacob Fowler	34 saves
2nd	MTL	Lane Hutson	1 goal
3rd	WPG	Stuart Skinner	19 saves

== Team rosters ==
Montreal Canadiens
#		Player	Position
8	(Canada)	Mike Matheson (A)	D
13	(United States)	Cole Caufield	RW
15	(Canada)	Alex Newhook	C
17	(Canada)	Josh Anderson (A)	RW
20	(Slovakia)	Juraj Slafkovský	LW
21	(Canada)	Kaiden Guhle	D
22	(United States)	Chris Kreider	LW
24	(Canada)	Phillip Danault	C
32	(United States)	Jacob Fowler	G
45	(Canada)	Alexandre Carrier	D
48	(United States)	Lane Hutson	D
53	(Canada)	Noah Dobson	D
63	(Canada)	Florian Xhekaj	LW
71	(Canada)	Jake Evans (A)	C
72	(Canada)	Arber Xhekaj	D
75	(Czech Republic)	Jakub Dobeš^{1}	G
76	(Canada)	Zachary Bolduc	RW
77	(Canada)	Kirby Dach	C
85	(France)	Alexandre Texier	LW
91	(Finland)	Oliver Kapanen	C
Head coach: (Canada) Martin St. Louis

Winnipeg Jets
#		Player	Position
2	(Canada)	Dylan DeMelo	D
4	(United States)	Neal Pionk	D
9	(United States)	Alex Iafallo	LW
13	(Canada)	Gabriel Vilardi	C
17	(Canada)	Adam Lowry (C)	C
19	(Canada)	Dawson Mercer	C
24	(Canada)	Haydn Fleury	D
27	(Sweden)	Isak Rosén	RW
33	(Canada)	Clay Stevenson^{2}	G
36	(Canada)	Morgan Barron	C
38	(Canada)	Mario Ferraro	D
45	(United States)	Cole Koepke	LW
54	(United States)	Dylan Samberg	D
55	(Canada)	Mark Scheifele (A)	C
57	(Sweden)	Elias Salomonsson	D
61	(Sweden)	Viggo Bjorck	C
62	(Switzerland)	Nino Niederreiter	RW
74	(Canada)	Stuart Skinner	G
81	(United States)	Kyle Connor (A)	LW
91	(Canada)	Cole Perfetti	C
Head coach: (Canada) Scott Arniel

Notes
^1 Jakub Dobeš dressed for the Montreal Canadiens as the back-up goalie and did not enter the game.
^2 Clay Stevenson dressed for the Winnipeg Jets as the back-up goalie and did not enter the game.

=== Scratches ===
- Montreal Canadiens: Owen Beck, Adam Engström, Nick Suzuki
- Winnipeg Jets: Tyrel Bauer, Nico Daws, Brad Lambert

== Entertainment ==
Local singer SoulBear sang the Canadian national anthem.

Following the anthem, former Jets Dustin Byfuglien, Andrew Ladd, and Blake Wheeler performed the ceremonial puck drop. During the second intermission, they joined other former Jets including Grant Clitsome, Cody Eakin, Toby Enstrom, Eric Fehr, Ron Hainsey, Michael Hutchinson, Jason Kasdorf, Bryan Little, Derek Meech, Adam Pardy, Anthony Peluso, Mathieu Perreault, Tim Stapleton, Paul Stastny, and Mark Stuart for a celebration of 15 years since the Winnipeg Jets returned to the city.

Ella Bright from Off Campus hosted the first intermission. Remi Wolf, Wolf Parade, Feist, and G Flip performed during the intermission. The setlist included songs from the successful hockey television series Heated Rivalry and Off Campus.
