= Princess Auto =

Canadian retail chain

Princess Auto Ltd.

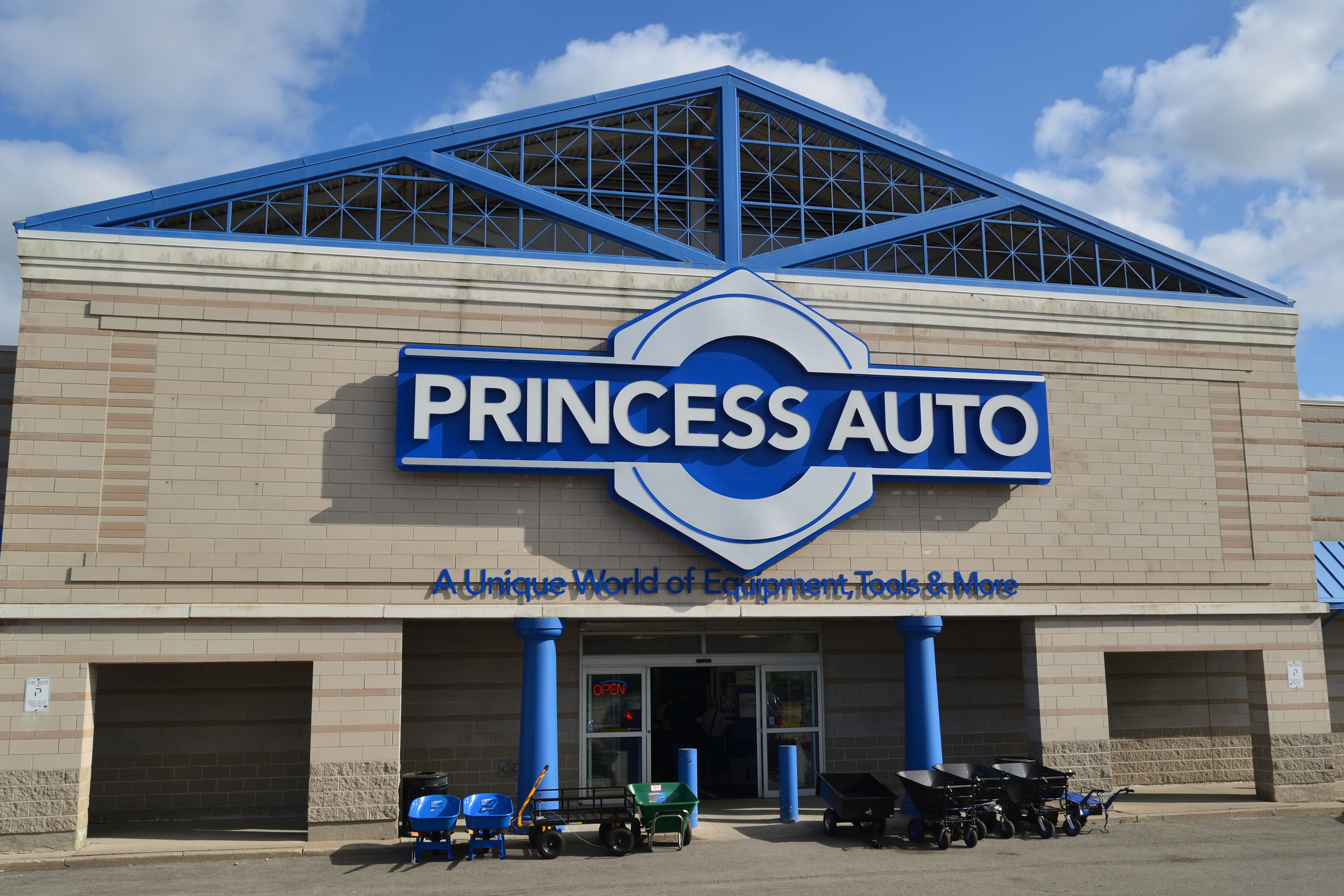
- Princess Auto store in Markham, Ontario
- Type: Private
- Industry: Retail
- Founded: 1933
- Founder: Harvey Tallman
- Headquarters: Winnipeg, Manitoba, Canada
- Number of locations: 55
- Key people: Bob Tallman (former CEO); Ken Larson (CEO)
- Products: Air & Power, HVAC, Automotive Repair & Shop, Tools & Safety, Metal Fab, Seasonal, Outdoor, Truck & Trailer, Driveline, Parts, Surplus
- Owner: Matt and Marc Tallman
- Number of employees: 3,000+ (2021)
- Website: princessauto.com

Princess Auto Ltd. is a Canadian retail chain specializing in farm, industrial, garage, hydraulics and surplus items.

Headquartered in Winnipeg, Manitoba, Princess Auto owns and operates 55 stores in ten provinces and three distribution centres (Winnipeg; Calgary, Alberta; and Milton, Ontario).

== History ==
Originally called Princess Auto Wrecking, the company was founded in Winnipeg, Manitoba, in 1933, and located on Princess Street in the Exchange District. The business was struggling and the founding owner, a former merchant marine, sold the company in 1942 to Harvey Tallman. Tallman expanded the auto wrecking business into war surplus, and later, tools and equipment.

The company went through a few name changes in its lifetime, beginning with its founding as Princess Auto Wrecking, changing to Princess Auto and Machinery, and finally, to Princess Auto Ltd.

In the mid-1940s, Tallman expanded into war surplus, buying salvaged items that returned from WWII and selling them. Since much of the customer base at that time were men returning from the war, the war surplus performed well and became a part of the business in addition to auto parts. Princess Auto converted surplus parts into farm and industrial equipment, repurposing engines and other items from military vehicles and machinery.

In 1951, the company started printing catalogs with order sheets that customers could mail in and then receive their purchases by rail. By the mid-1950s, 70 percent of the business was mail order. In 1977, Princess Auto became a retailer, opening its first store in Edmonton, Alberta. Still offering a national call centre and mail order service, the company began also selling items online in 1998.

In 2015, a manufacturing division in Winnipeg was closed. Princess Auto also offers online sales, a national call centre, and mail order service.

Amid the COVID-19 pandemic, the company became an omnichannel retailer, offering a buy online, pick-up in store (BOPIS) option to its customers. This was paired with a curbside pickup process to meet pandemic guidelines.

On January 23, 2024, it was announced that Princess Auto would replace IGM Financial as the naming rights sponsor of IG Field—the home stadium of the Canadian Football League's Winnipeg Blue Bombers—renaming it Princess Auto Stadium.

== Stores ==
As of October 2024, the company owns and operates 56 stores and three distribution centres (Winnipeg, Manitoba; Calgary, Alberta; and Milton, Ontario)., with the most recent location opening in Joliette, QC in October 2024. Since the opening of its first Quebec store in Saint-Jérôme in September 2019, it has had stores in every province.
