= 2022 NHL Heritage Classic =

Outdoor National Hockey League game

	1	2	3	Total
Toronto Maple Leafs	0	2	0	2
Buffalo Sabres	0	2	3	5
- Date: March 13, 2022
- Venue: Tim Hortons Field
- City: Hamilton
- Attendance: 26,119

The 2022 NHL Heritage Classic (branded as the 2022 Tim Hortons NHL Heritage Classic for sponsorship reasons) was an outdoor regular season National Hockey League (NHL) game. The game, the sixth Heritage Classic, was held on March 13, 2022, in Hamilton, Ontario, Canada, between the Buffalo Sabres and the Toronto Maple Leafs at Tim Hortons Field. After falling behind 2–1, the Sabres scored four unanswered goals to defeat the Maple Leafs, 5–2.

== Background ==
The league announced the game on September 16, 2021. Hamilton was chosen due to its location in the Golden Horseshoe midway between Buffalo and Toronto. This was Toronto's first Heritage Classic appearance, and their fourth overall outdoor game appearance, becoming the only team to participate in a Winter Classic, Stadium Series, and Heritage Classic. Buffalo became the first U.S. team to both compete in and be designated as host team for the Heritage Classic, despite the game being played in Canada.

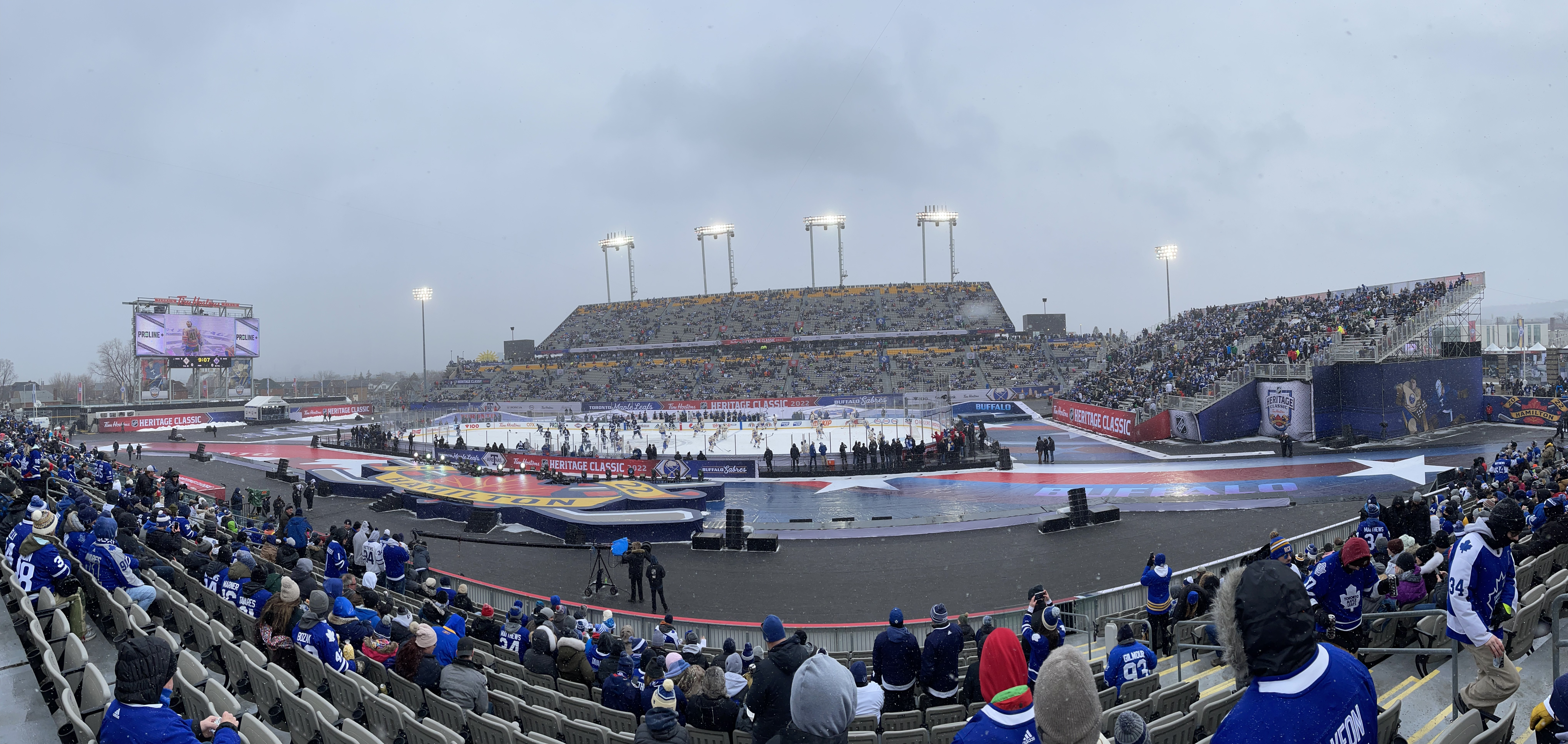
2022 Heritage Classic warmups

== Game summary ==
March 13	Toronto Maple Leafs	2–5	Buffalo Sabres	Tim Hortons Field	Recap

Scoring summary
Period	Team	Goal	Assist(s)	Time	Score
1st	None				
2nd	TOR	Ondrej Kase (12)	William Nylander (32) and John Tavares (36)	00:40	1–0 TOR
2nd	BUF	Peyton Krebs (5)	Vinnie Hinostroza (11), Robert Hagg (7)	01:22	1–1
2nd	TOR	Auston Matthews (45)	Alex Kerfoot (33) and T.J. Brodie (16)	02:57	2–1 TOR
2nd	BUF	Vinnie Hinostroza (9)	Tage Thompson (20) and Mattias Samuelsson (3)	10:53	2–2
3rd	BUF	Vinnie Hinostroza (10)	Unassisted	05:16	3–2 BUF
3rd	BUF	Peyton Krebs (6)	Dylan Cozens (19) and Kyle Okposo (20)	13:49	4–2 BUF
3rd	BUF	Tage Thompson (24) – sh – en	Unassisted	17:35	5–2 BUF

Number in parentheses represents the player's total in goals or assists to that point of the season

Penalty summary
Period	Team	Player	Penalty	Time	PIM
1st	TOR	Pierre Engvall	Roughing	18:04	2:00
1st	BUF	Vinnie Hinostroza	Roughing	18:04	2:00
1st	BUF	Henri Jokiharju	Roughing	18:04	2:00
2nd	BUF	John Hayden	Hooking	5:53	2:00
2nd	TOR	Ilya Lyubushkin	Hooking	18:35	2:00
3rd	TOR	Timothy Liljegren	Tripping	01:38	2:00
3rd	TOR	T.J. Brodie	Hooking	08:49	2:00
3rd	TOR	Auston Matthews	Cross-checking	14:55	2:00
3rd	BUF	Rasmus Dahlin	Cross-checking	14:55	2:00
3rd	BUF	Kyle Okposo	Tripping	16:41	2:00
3rd	TOR	Michael Bunting (served by John Tavares)	Roughing	18:17	2:00
3rd	TOR	Michael Bunting	Misconduct	18:17	10:00
3rd	TOR	Ilya Mikheyev	Misconduct	18:17	10:00
3rd	BUF	Tage Thompson	Misconduct	18:17	10:00
3rd	BUF	Dylan Cozens	Misconduct	18:17	10:00

Shots by period
Team	1	2	3	Total
TOR	9	18	9	36
BUF	14	9	15	38

Power play opportunities
Team	Goals/Opportunities
Toronto	0/3
Buffalo	0/4

Three star selections
	Team	Player	Statistics
1st	BUF	Peyton Krebs	2 goals
2nd	BUF	Vinnie Hinostroza	2 goals, 1 assist
3rd	TOR	Ondrej Kase	1 goal

== Team rosters ==
Toronto Maple Leafs
#		Player	Position
3	(United States)	Justin Holl	D
15	(Canada)	Alex Kerfoot	C
16	(Canada)	Mitch Marner	RW
19	(Canada)	Jason Spezza	C
24	(Canada)	Wayne Simmonds	RW
25	(Czech Republic)	Ondrej Kase	RW
34	(United States)	Auston Matthews (A)	C
35	(Czech Republic)	Petr Mrazek	G
37	(Sweden)	Timothy Liljegren	D
38	(Sweden)	Rasmus Sandin	D
44	(Canada)	Morgan Rielly (A)	D
46	(Russia)	Ilya Lyubushkin	D
47	(Sweden)	Pierre Engvall	LW
50	(Sweden)	Erik Kallgren	G
58	(Canada)	Michael Bunting	LW
64	(Czech Republic)	David Kampf	C
65	(Russia)	Ilya Mikheyev	RW
78	(Canada)	T.J. Brodie	D
88	(Sweden)	William Nylander	RW
91	(Canada)	John Tavares (C)	C
Head coach: (Canada) Sheldon Keefe

Buffalo Sabres
#		Player	Position
8	(Sweden)	Robert Hagg	D
10	(Finland)	Henri Jokiharju	D
13	(Canada)	Mark Pysyk (A)	D
15	(United States)	John Hayden	C
19	(Canada)	Peyton Krebs	C
20	(Canada)	Cody Eakin	C
21	(United States)	Kyle Okposo (A)	RW
23	(United States)	Mattias Samuelsson	D
24	(Canada)	Dylan Cozens	C
26	(Sweden)	Rasmus Dahlin (A)	D
29	(United States)	Vinnie Hinostroza	C
31	(Canada)	Dustin Tokarski	G
37	(United States)	Casey Mittelstadt	C
41	(United States)	Craig Anderson	G
53	(Canada)	Jeff Skinner	LW
71	(Sweden)	Victor Olofsson	LW
72	(United States)	Tage Thompson	RW
74	(Sweden)	Rasmus Asplund	C
78	(Canada)	Jacob Bryson	D
89	(United States)	Alex Tuch	RW
Head coach: (United States) Don Granato

Erik Kallgren and Dustin Tokarski dressed as the back-up goaltenders. Neither entered the game.

=== Scratches ===
- Toronto Maple Leafs: Travis Dermott, Kyle Clifford, Nick Robertson
- Buffalo Sabres: Mark Jankowski, Casey Fitzgerald, Anders Bjork

== Attendance ==
The 2022 Heritage Classic was the lowest attended NHL outdoor game with 26,119 spectators. This was due to the venues small size compared to other outdoor game venues, as the 2022 game was a sold-out crowd. It was only 205 spectators less than the venue's record attendance at the time, which was seen at the 2021 Grey Cup.

== Entertainment ==
Country pop singer and Canada's Got Talent host Lindsay Ell performed the Canadian and American national anthems and singer Alessia Cara performed during the first intermission. The Canadian Olympic women's ice hockey team, the gold medal winners at the 2022 Winter Olympics, were honoured during the second intermission. This game marks the first time that the bilingual version of O Canada was sung at the Heritage Classic.

== Television ==
The game was broadcast on Sportsnet and TVA Sports in Canada and on TNT in the U.S.
