= NHL Heritage Classic =

Ice hockey game

NHL Heritage Classic La Classique Héritage de la LNH
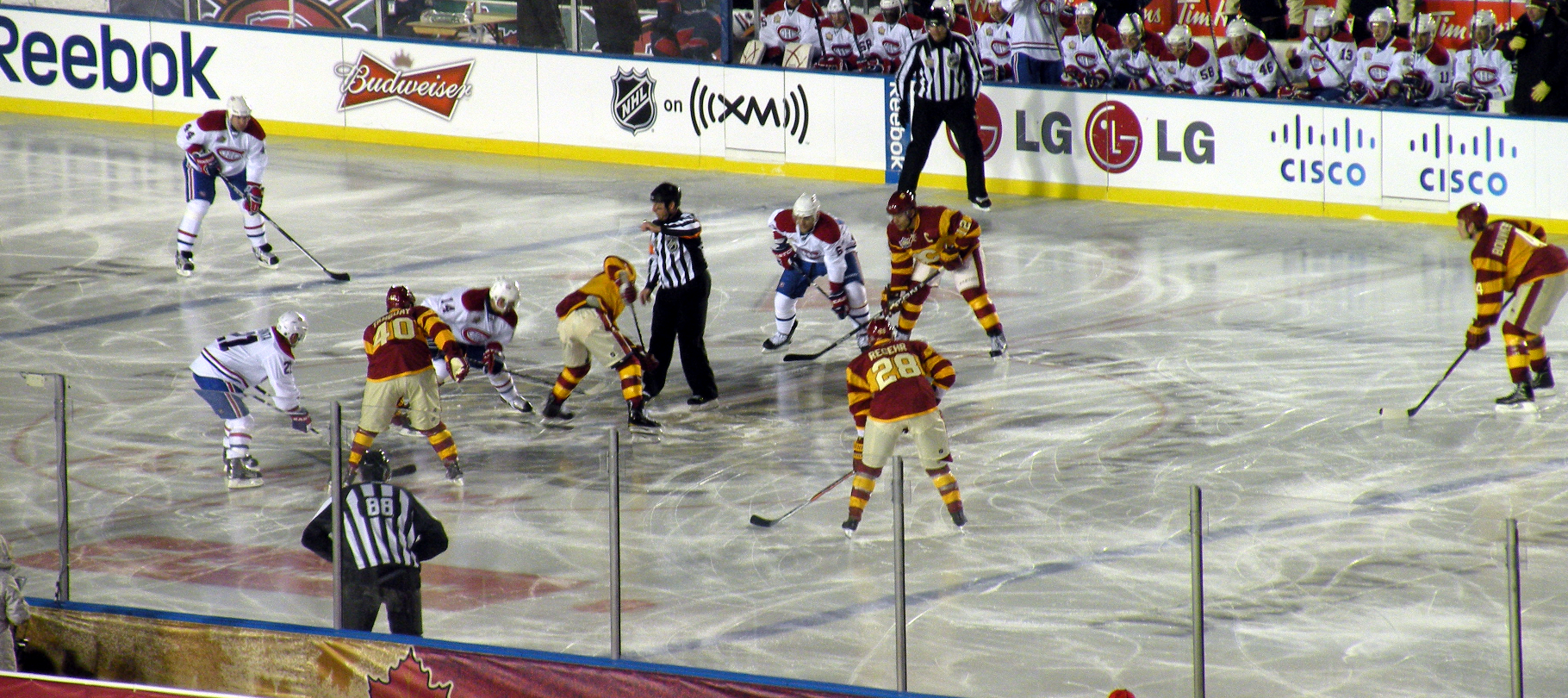
- The Canadiens and Flames face off at the 2011 Heritage Classic in Calgary

National Hockey League
- First played: November 22, 2003
- Times Held: 8
- Teams Participated: 8
- Most Appearances: Calgary Flames; Edmonton Oilers; Montreal Canadiens; Winnipeg Jets; (3)
- Most wins: Edmonton Oilers; Montreal Canadiens; (2)
- Most Recent: October 25, 2026
- Most Recent Winner: Montreal Canadiens

The NHL Heritage Classic (French: La Classique Héritage de la LNH) is one of the series of regular season outdoor games played in the National Hockey League (NHL) that is held in football stadiums based in Canada. Unlike the NHL's other two series of outdoor games, the NHL Winter Classic and the NHL Stadium Series, the Heritage Classic has been held infrequently: only eight games have been played in the series so far, and the first five match-ups were exclusively between Canadian teams. Since 2014, the Heritage Classic usually takes place early (around late October) or later (around March) in the NHL regular season in order to avoid playing during harsh Canadian winters.

The inaugural Heritage Classic, hosted by the Edmonton Oilers at Commonwealth Stadium in 2003, was the first outdoor regular season game in NHL history and its success served as the precursor to outdoor hockey games played around the world. The second Heritage Classic, played at McMahon Stadium in Calgary in 2011, set sponsorship and revenue records. The third Heritage Classic was hosted in Vancouver's BC Place stadium in 2014. The fourth game was hosted by Winnipeg at Investors Group Field, now known as IG Field, in October 2016. The fifth game was held on October 26, 2019, at Mosaic Stadium in Regina, Saskatchewan. The sixth Heritage Classic for 2022 was played at Tim Hortons Field in Hamilton, Ontario. The Toronto Maple Leafs made their first Heritage Classic appearance (they were the only Canadian team who had yet to play in a Heritage Classic, although they had appeared in a Winter Classic, the Centennial Classic and in one Stadium Series game), and played against the Buffalo Sabres, the first U.S. team appearing in a Heritage Classic. The seventh Heritage Classic was hosted by the Oilers for the second time, with their opponent being the Calgary Flames in the first outdoor hockey Battle of Alberta. The eighth Heritage Classic was hosted by the Jets for the second time with their opponent being the Montreal Canadiens, being played at Princess Auto Stadium in Winnipeg, Manitoba.

== History ==
The first Heritage Classic was played in 2003 and hosted by the Edmonton Oilers. The first regular season outdoor game in NHL history, it was held at Commonwealth Stadium between the Oilers and the Montreal Canadiens. The Oilers had suggested the idea of hosting an outdoor game as early as the mid 1980s, but the genesis of the 2003 event was the "Cold War" outdoor game played two years prior between Michigan State University and the University of Michigan.

Demand for tickets to the game was unprecedented in the history of Edmonton sports events. After sales to Edmonton's season ticket holders and league sponsors, the Oilers held a lottery for the remaining 7,000 seats that awarded 1,750 persons the opportunity to purchase four tickets each. The team received over 750,000 entries from around the world. The game attracted a crowd of 57,167 that set an NHL single-game attendance record that more than doubled the previous mark. The event featured an alumni game between past greats of the Canadiens and Oilers, including Wayne Gretzky and Guy Lafleur. The game itself was played at a temperature of −25 °C (−13 °F); the Canadiens defeated the Oilers by a score of 4–3.

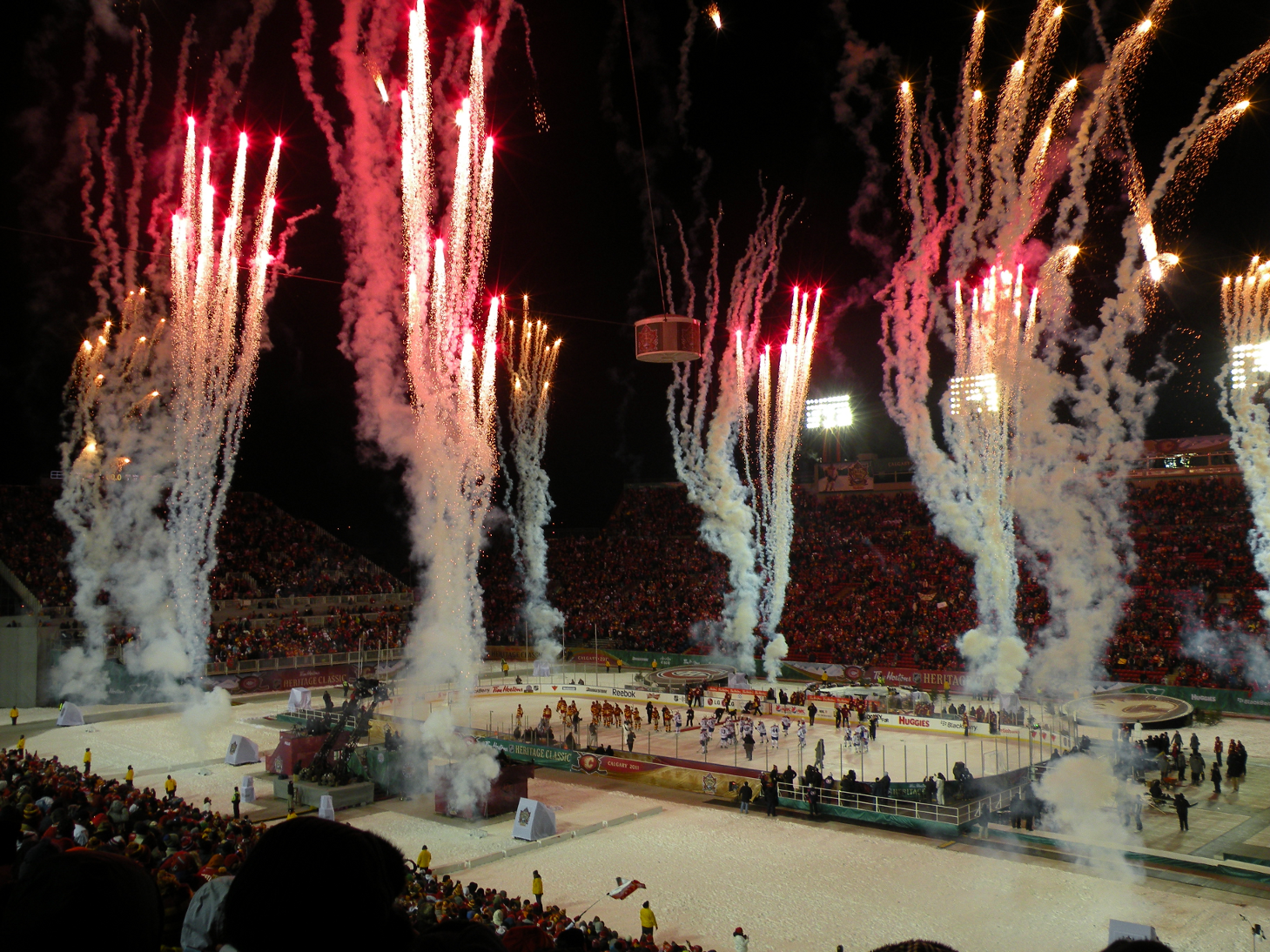
Fireworks at the end of the 2011 NHL Heritage Classic. The event was revived in 2011 as a Canadian equivalent to the Winter Classic.

The success of the Heritage Classic led to the 2008 Winter Classic, which was played in Buffalo between the Buffalo Sabres and Pittsburgh Penguins. A new league record crowd of 71,217 watched the Penguins defeat the Sabres in a game that quickly became the NHL's showcase event. The Winter Classic became an annual event but focused on American teams. Faced with increasing criticism at the lack of Canadian participation in the Winter Classic, the NHL revived the Heritage Classic in 2011 and pitted the Canadiens against the host Calgary Flames. It marked the first time the NHL held two outdoor games in the same season, a decision that some commentators, including ESPN's Scott Burnside, argued would dilute the spectacle of the Winter Classic.

Like the Edmonton game, the 2011 NHL Heritage Classic was a success, as the Flames defeated Montreal 4–0 in front of 41,022 fans at McMahon Stadium. The game achieved high television ratings in both Canada and the United States and, due to record sponsorship, grossed the highest revenue for a single event in NHL history.

The third Heritage Classic was played at BC Place in Vancouver in 2014 between the Vancouver Canucks and Ottawa Senators. It was part of a six-game outdoor set during the 2013–14 NHL season that included the 2014 Winter Classic and the four-game Stadium Series.

The Winnipeg Jets played host to the Oilers in the fourth Heritage Classic on October 23, 2016, at Investors Group Field, during the 2016–17 NHL season. This game brought in 11,000 visitors and over $11.2 million in direct tourism spending for the city of Winnipeg.

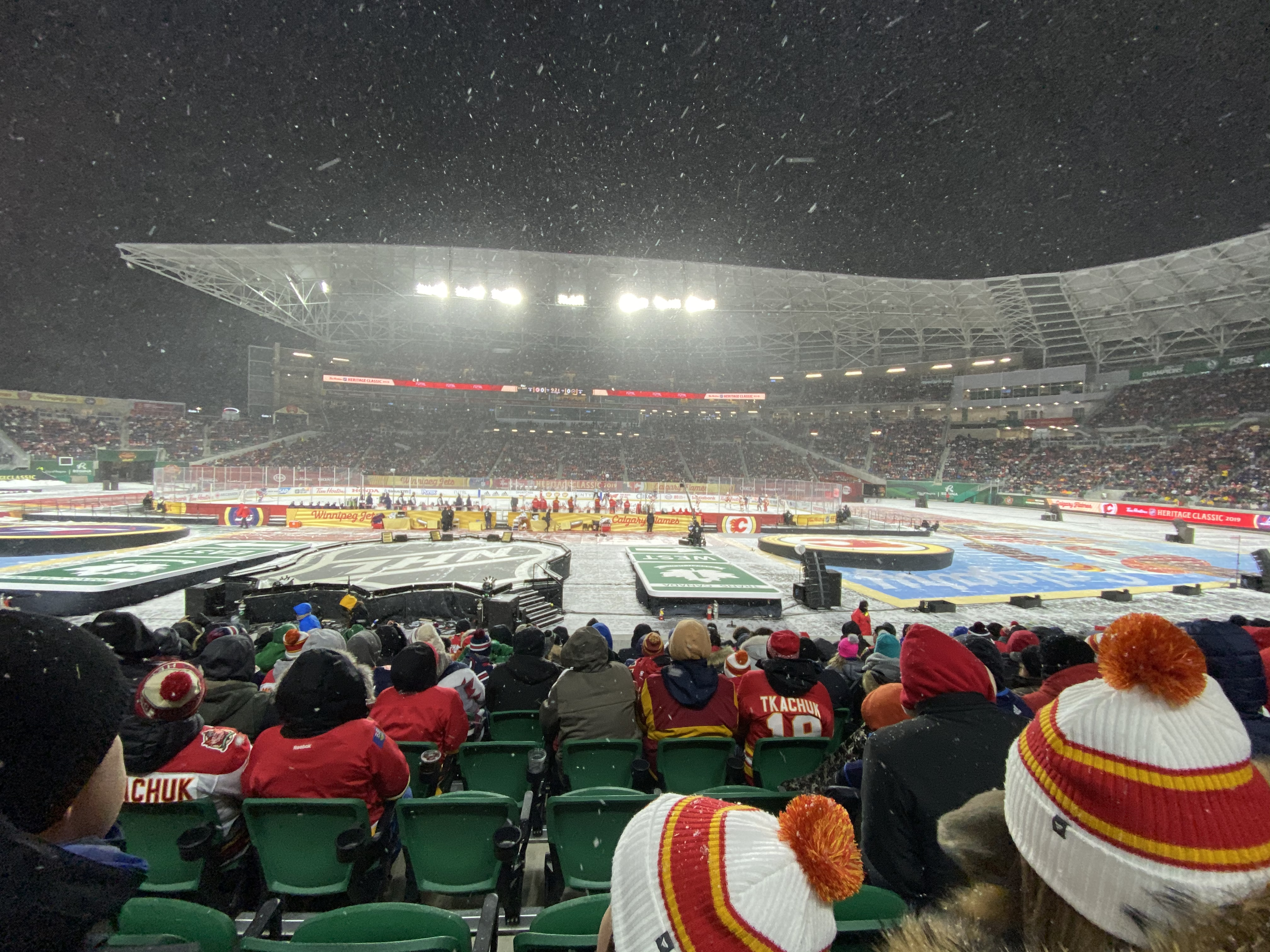
The 2019 NHL Heritage Classic was hosted in Mosaic Stadium, the first time it has been hosted outside the locale the participating teams are based in

The fifth Heritage Classic was played on October 26, 2019, during the 2019–20 NHL season, with the Jets and the Flames at Mosaic Stadium in Regina, Saskatchewan, a neutral site roughly between Winnipeg and Calgary.

On September 16, 2021, the league announced that a sixth Heritage Classic would be played on March 13, 2022, between the Toronto Maple Leafs and the Buffalo Sabres at Tim Hortons Field in Hamilton, Ontario. The Sabres won 5-2.

On January 1, 2023, the NHL announced that Commonwealth Stadium would return as host of the Heritage Classic in 2023, this time showcasing the Battle of Alberta between the Calgary Flames and the Edmonton Oilers. The Oilers would come away with a 5-2 victory over the Flames.

On December 6, 2025, it was announced that the Winnipeg Jets will host the Montreal Canadiens in the 2026 NHL Heritage Classic at Princess Auto Stadium (formerly Investors Group Field), marking the second time that the venue hosted the Heritage Classic.

== List of games ==
Bolded teams denote winners

No.	Year	Season	Date	City	Stadium	Primary team at venue	Away team	Score	Home team	Attendance	Ref
1st	2003	2003–04	November 22	Edmonton, Alberta	Commonwealth Stadium	Edmonton Eskimos	**Montreal Canadiens**	4–3	Edmonton Oilers	57,167	
2nd	2011	2010–11	February 20	Calgary, Alberta	McMahon Stadium	Calgary Stampeders	Montreal Canadiens	0–4	**Calgary Flames**	41,022	
3rd	2014	2013–14	March 2	Vancouver, British Columbia	BC Place	BC Lions	**Ottawa Senators**	4–2	Vancouver Canucks	54,194	
4th	2016	2016–17	October 23	Winnipeg, Manitoba	Investors Group Field	Winnipeg Blue Bombers	**Edmonton Oilers**	3–0	Winnipeg Jets	33,240	
5th	2019	2019–20	October 26	Regina, Saskatchewan	Mosaic Stadium	Saskatchewan Roughriders	Calgary Flames	1–2	**Winnipeg Jets**	33,518	
6th	2022	2021–22	March 13	Hamilton, Ontario	Tim Hortons Field	Hamilton Tiger-Cats	Toronto Maple Leafs	2–5	**Buffalo Sabres**	26,119	
7th	2023	2023–24	October 29	Edmonton, Alberta	Commonwealth Stadium	Edmonton Elks	Calgary Flames	2–5	**Edmonton Oilers**	55,411	
8th	2026	2026–27	October 25	Winnipeg, Manitoba	Princess Auto Stadium	Winnipeg Blue Bombers	**Montreal Canadiens**	2–1	Winnipeg Jets	32,342	

== Appearances ==
Team	Appearances	Last	Wins	Losses
Edmonton Oilers	3	2023	2	1
Montreal Canadiens	3	2026	2	1
Calgary Flames	3	2023	1	2
Winnipeg Jets	3	2026	1	2
Buffalo Sabres	1	2022	1	0
Ottawa Senators	1	2014	1	0
Toronto Maple Leafs	1	2022	0	1
Vancouver Canucks	1	2014	0	1

== Winning and losing teams ==
Teams	Win	Loss	Total	Year(s) won	Year(s) lost
Edmonton Oilers	2	1	3	2016, 2023	2003
Montreal Canadiens	2	1	3	2003, 2026	2011
Calgary Flames	1	2	3	2011	2019, 2023
Winnipeg Jets	1	2	3	2019	2016, 2026
Ottawa Senators	1	0	1	2014	
Buffalo Sabres	1	0	1	2022	
Vancouver Canucks	0	1	1		2014
Toronto Maple Leafs	0	1	1		2022

== Broadcasters ==
CBC's Hockey Night in Canada broadcast the 2003, 2011, 2014 and 2019 games. In the first three editions, CBC Sports solely produced the games, then in 2019, Sportsnet not only took over production, but also simulcast the game on their networks. In 2016, 2022 and 2023, the games were aired only on Sportsnet, and will continue to do so in future Heritage Classics after CBC declined to renew its sublicensing agreement for Hockey Night in Canada in 2026.

In the United States, the first Heritage Classic was not broadcast to then-rightsholders ESPN/ABC due to its prior commitments with college football. Instead, the game was aired to American audiences on NHL Center Ice via the CBC feed. In 2011, 2014 and 2019, Versus/NBCSN would air the Heritage Classic, with the network providing their own broadcast crews for the first two games, and the last game featuring a simulcast from Sportsnet. In 2016, NHL Network simulcast Sportsnet's broadcast of the Heritage Classic. Then in 2022, TNT aired the Heritage Classic with their own broadcast crews, as the game featured an American team for the first time. In 2023, TNT's sister channel TBS aired the Heritage Classic due to TNT's prior commitment to a USWNT friendly match. This marked the first NHL regular season game broadcast by the network under their current deal.
