= 2019 NHL Heritage Classic =

Outdoor National Hockey League game

	1	2	3	OT	Total
Calgary Flames	0	1	0	0	1
Winnipeg Jets	0	0	1	1	2
- Date: October 26, 2019
- Venue: Mosaic Stadium
- City: Regina
- Attendance: 33,518

The 2019 NHL Heritage Classic (branded as the 2019 Tim Hortons NHL Heritage Classic for sponsorship reasons) was an outdoor regular season National Hockey League (NHL) game. The game, the fifth Heritage Classic, was held on October 26, 2019, in Regina, Saskatchewan, Canada. The Winnipeg Jets defeated the Calgary Flames, 2–1, at Mosaic Stadium in Regina—the home field of the Canadian Football League's Saskatchewan Roughriders.

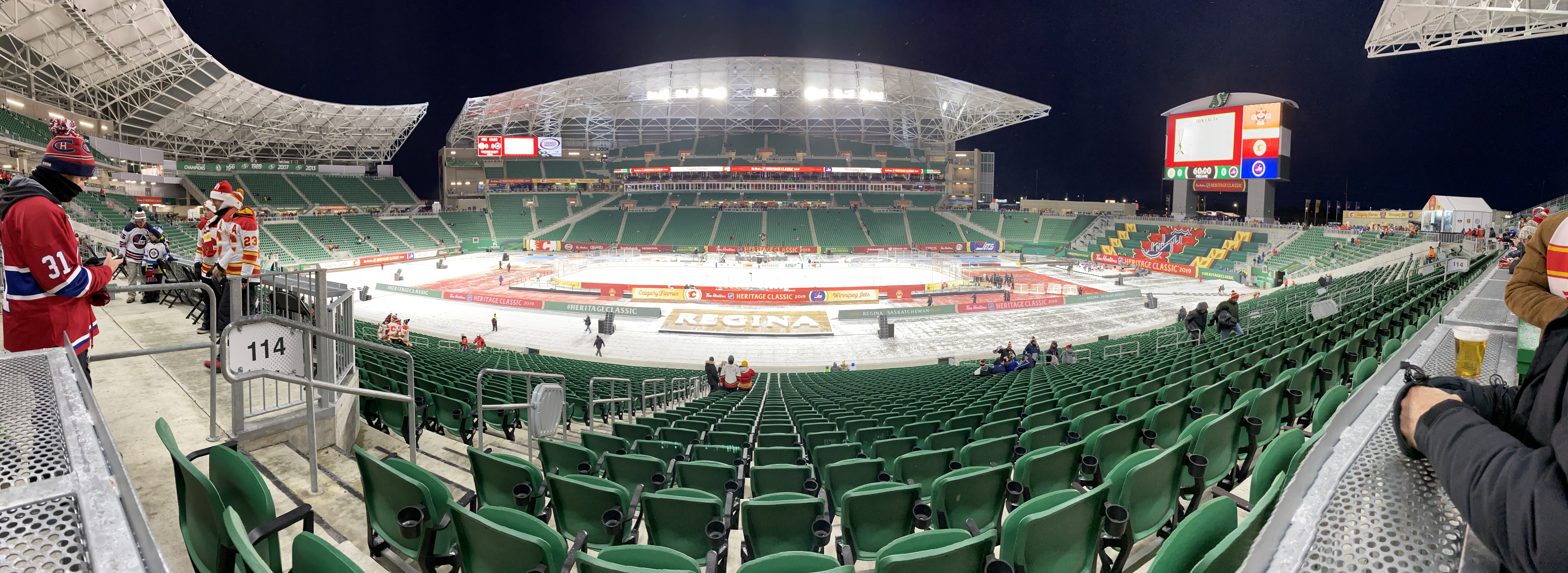
Mosaic Stadium during the 2019 Heritage Classic

== Background ==
This was the first NHL regular season outdoor game that was held in a neutral site territory that is not formally part of an NHL market, the first regular season game held in Regina, and the first regular season game held in Saskatchewan since 1994. Notably however it was not the first major professional regular season hockey game in the Queen City since historically, Regina had been the home of the defunct Western Canada Hockey League's Regina Capitals, who moved to Portland, Oregon in 1925. Regina is located roughly half-way between Calgary and Winnipeg. The Jets were designated as the home team. This was also the second outdoor game for each team; the Flames and Jets respectively hosted the 2011 and 2016 Heritage Classic games at their cities' respective CFL stadiums.

To accommodate the game, the CFL scheduled a three week road trip for the Riders near the end of the 2019 CFL season. Saskatchewan played its penultimate home game on October 5, followed by three road games while its stadium was converted to an outdoor hockey rink and back again. The Riders returned to Mosaic Stadium on November 2 for their final 2019 regular season game.

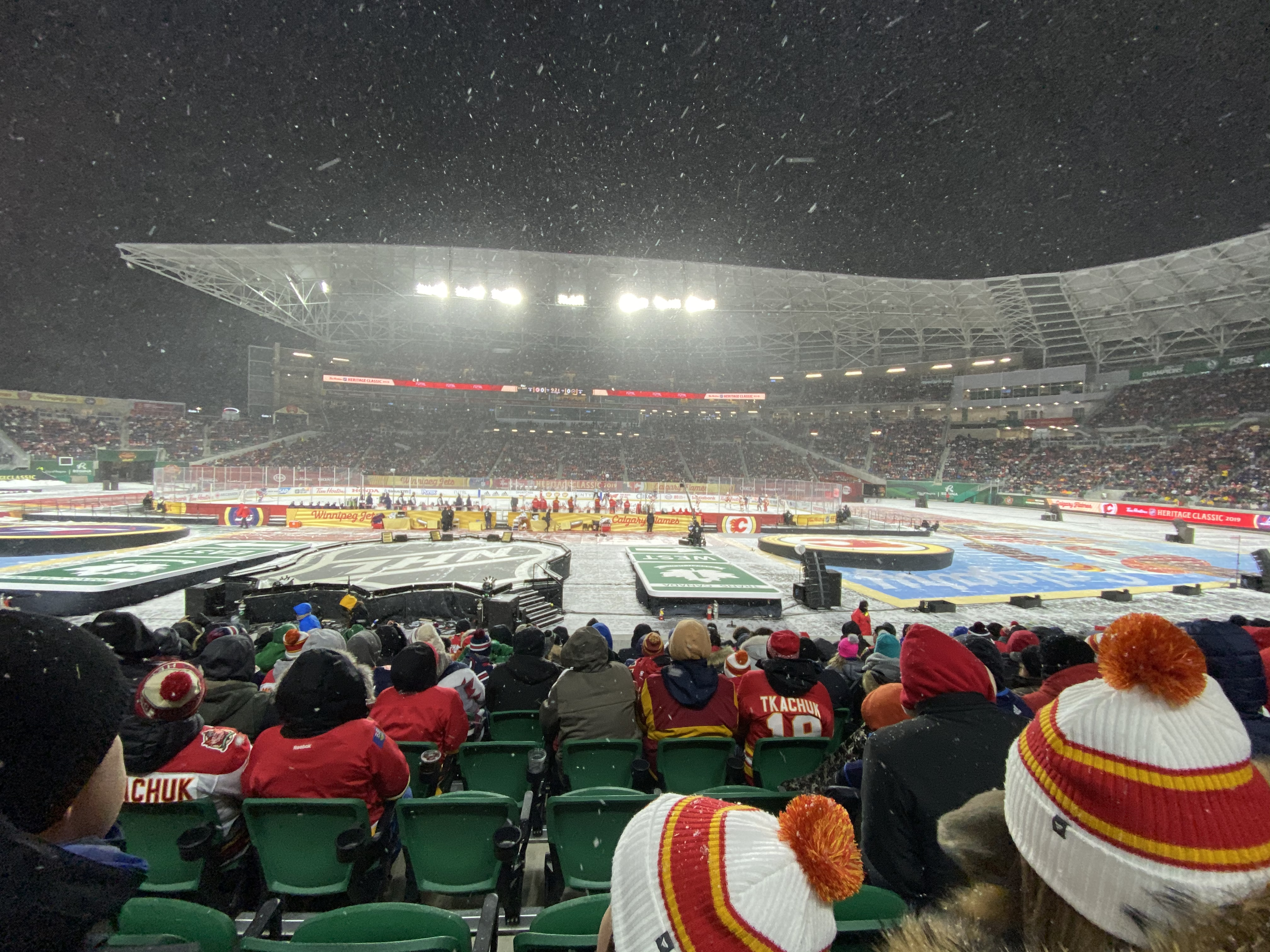
Gameplay between the Winnipeg Jets and the Calgary Flames during the 2019 Heritage Classic

== Game summary ==
October 26	Calgary Flames	1–2	OT	Winnipeg Jets	Mosaic Stadium	Recap

Bryan Little scored at 3:04 of overtime to give the Jets the 2–1 win. The Flames' Elias Lindholm opened the scoring on a power play at 14:47 of the second period. Winnipeg's Josh Morrissey then tied the game on a power play at 15:49 of the third period.

At 19:58 of the second period, the Jets' Adam Lowry was given a minor penalty for boarding the Flames' Oliver Kylington. The league later gave Lowry a two-game suspension as a repeat offender.

Scoring summary
Period	Team	Goal	Assist(s)	Time	Score
1st	None				
2nd	CGY	Elias Lindholm (7) – pp	Johnny Gaudreau (7) and Sean Monahan (6)	14:47	1–0 CGY
3rd	WPG	Josh Morrissey (1) – pp	Patrik Laine (10) and Mark Scheifele (9)	15:49	1–1
OT	WPG	Bryan Little (1)	Kyle Connor (2) and Neal Pionk (6)	03:04	2–1 WPG

Number in parentheses represents the player's total in goals or assists to that point of the season

Penalty summary
Period	Team	Player	Penalty	Time	PIM
1st	CGY	Sean Monahan	Delay of game (puck over glass)	08:48	2:00
2nd	CGY	T. J. Brodie	Tripping	05:52	2:00
2nd	CGY	Sam Bennett	Goaltender interference	10:10	2:00
2nd	WPG	Andrew Copp	Hooking	13:09	2:00
2nd	WPG	Bench (served by Mathieu Perreault)	Delay of game (unsuccessful coach's challenge)	14:47	2:00
2nd	WPG	Adam Lowry	Boarding	20:00	2:00
3rd	CGY	Mark Giordano	Hooking	14:50	2:00
OT	CGY	Sean Monahan	Tripping	00:39	2:00

Shots by period
Team	1	2	3	OT	Total
CGY	11	15	4	0	30
WPG	14	12	15	4	45

Power play opportunities
Team	Goals/Opportunities
Calgary	1/3
Winnipeg	1/5

Three star selections
	Team	Player	Statistics
1st	WPG	Bryan Little	1 goal
2nd	CGY	David Rittich	43 saves
3rd	WPG	Josh Morrissey	1 goal

== Team rosters ==
Calgary Flames (OT Loss, 6–5–2)
Head coach: Bill Peters
	Nat.	Player	Position	G	A	Pts	PIM	+/-	SOG
4	(Sweden)	Rasmus Andersson	D	0	0	0	0	E	3
5	(Canada)	Mark Giordano (C)	D	0	0	0	2	E	1
7	(Canada)	T.J. Brodie	D	0	0	0	2	−1	0
10	(United States)	Derek Ryan	C	0	0	0	0	−1	1
11	(Sweden)	Mikael Backlund	C	0	0	0	0	E	3
13	(United States)	Johnny Gaudreau	LW	0	1	1	0	E	6
16	(Germany)	Tobias Rieder	LW	0	0	0	0	E	1
17	(Canada)	Milan Lucic	LW	0	0	0	0	E	1
19	(United States)	Matthew Tkachuk (A)	LW	0	0	0	0	−1	6
23	(Canada)	Sean Monahan (A)	C	0	1	1	4	E	1
24	(Canada)	Travis Hamonic	D	0	0	0	0	E	1
28	(Sweden)	Elias Lindholm	C	1	0	1	0	E	1
55	(United States)	Noah Hanifin	D	0	0	0	0	E	1
58	(Sweden)	Oliver Kylington	D	0	0	0	0	E	2
67	(Czech Republic)	Michael Frolik	RW	0	0	0	0	E	1
88	(Canada)	Andrew Mangiapane	LW	0	0	0	0	E	0
89	(Canada)	Alan Quine	C	0	0	0	0	E	0
93	(Canada)	Sam Bennett	RW	0	0	0	2	E	1

	Nat.	Goaltender	Result	Rec	GA	SA	SV	SV%	TOI
33	(Czech Republic)	David Rittich	OTL	5–3–2	2	45	43	0.956	63:04
39	(Canada)	Cam Talbot	—	—	—	—	—	—	—

Winnipeg Jets (Win, 6–6–0)
Head coach: Paul Maurice
	Nat.	Player	Position	G	A	Pts	PIM	+/-	SOG
2	(United States)	Anthony Bitetto	D	0	0	0	0	E	0
3	(United States)	Tucker Poolman	D	0	0	0	0	E	3
4	(United States)	Neal Pionk	D	0	1	1	0	+1	1
7	(Russia)	Dmitry Kulikov	D	0	0	0	0	E	1
9	(United States)	Andrew Copp	C	0	0	0	2	E	3
17	(Canada)	Adam Lowry	C	0	0	0	2	E	0
18	(Canada)	Bryan Little	RW	1	0	1	0	+1	2
19	(Sweden)	David Gustafsson	C	0	0	0	0	E	1
23	(Sweden)	Carl Dahlstrom	D	0	0	0	0	E	0
26	(United States)	Blake Wheeler (C)	RW	0	0	0	0	E	5
27	(Denmark)	Nikolaj Ehlers	LW	0	0	0	0	E	3
28	(United States)	Jack Roslovic	C	0	0	0	0	E	4
29	(Finland)	Patrik Laine	RW	0	1	1	0	E	5
44	(Canada)	Josh Morrissey (A)	D	1	0	1	0	E	6
55	(Canada)	Mark Scheifele (A)	C	0	1	1	0	E	2
57	(Canada)	Gabriel Bourque	LW	0	0	0	0	E	3
81	(United States)	Kyle Connor	LW	0	1	1	0	+1	3
85	(Canada)	Mathieu Perreault	LW	0	0	0	0	E	3

	Nat.	Goaltender	Result	Rec	GA	SA	SV	SV%	TOI
30	(Canada)	Laurent Brossoit	—	—	—	—	—	—	—
37	(United States)	Connor Hellebuyck	W	5–4–0	1	30	29	0.967	62:46

Scratches – Did not play

Calgary Flames: Michael Stone, Mark Jankowski

Winnipeg Jets: Luca Sbisa, Ville Heinola, Mason Appleton

Officials

Referee: Brad Meier, Graham Skilliter

Linesmen: Kiel Murchison, Trent Knorr

== Entertainment ==
The Hunter Brothers sang the national anthem, The Sheepdogs performed during the first intermission, and Jess Moskaluke sang during the second intermission.

== Television ==
This game aired as the late 10 p.m. EDT (8 p.m. local time) game on Hockey Night in Canada. In the U.S., NBCSN simulcast the HNIC feed; it was the second game of a rare Saturday night doubleheader on NBCSN that followed a 2019 Stanley Cup Finals rematch between the St. Louis Blues and the Boston Bruins. This would be the last Heritage Classic that NBCSN would air, as NBC later lost the NHL media rights to ESPN/ABC and TNT Sports before the 2021-22 season. TNT picked up the Heritage Classic as part of their package. This is also the last NHL outdoor game to be broadcast on CBC, as all subsequent Heritage Classics and any outdoor game involving a Canadian team would be produced and broadcast exclusively on Sportsnet. In 2026, CBC declined to renew its sublicensing deal with Sportsnet for Hockey Night in Canada.

== Festivities ==
The Western Hockey League's Regina Pats (who play at nearby Brandt Centre) hosted a "Prairie Classic" outdoor game against the Calgary Hitmen on October 27. Calgary won the game 5-4 in overtime.
