= 2023 NHL Heritage Classic =

Outdoor Ice Hockey game held in Edmonton

	1	2	3	Total
Calgary Flames	1	1	0	2
Edmonton Oilers	3	0	2	5
- Date: October 29, 2023
- Venue: Commonwealth Stadium
- City: Edmonton
- Attendance: 55,411

The 2023 NHL Heritage Classic (branded as the 2023 Tim Hortons NHL Heritage Classic for sponsorship reasons) was an outdoor regular season National Hockey League (NHL) game. The seventh game in the Heritage Classic series took place on October 29, 2023, at Commonwealth Stadium in Edmonton, Alberta, Canada, with the Edmonton Oilers hosting the Calgary Flames. It was the first outdoor game in the Battle of Alberta rivalry.

== Background ==
During the "32 Thoughts" segment on the December 10, 2022, broadcast of Hockey Night in Canada, Elliotte Friedman initially reported that the NHL was planning a Heritage Classic game between the Edmonton Oilers and the Calgary Flames during the 2023–24 season, marking the 20th anniversary of the first Heritage Classic between the Montreal Canadiens and the Oilers at Commonwealth Stadium. While the 2003 game was held in November, Friedman stated that the league was aiming for October so the weather would be a little warmer; the 2003 contest had been held in temperatures of close to -18 C, with a wind chill of -30 C. The league officially announced the game on December 31, 2022.

The 2023 Heritage Classic marked the first outdoor game in the Battle of Alberta rivalry and the third one for each team.

A moment of silence for former Pittsburgh Penguins player Adam Johnson was held prior to the game.

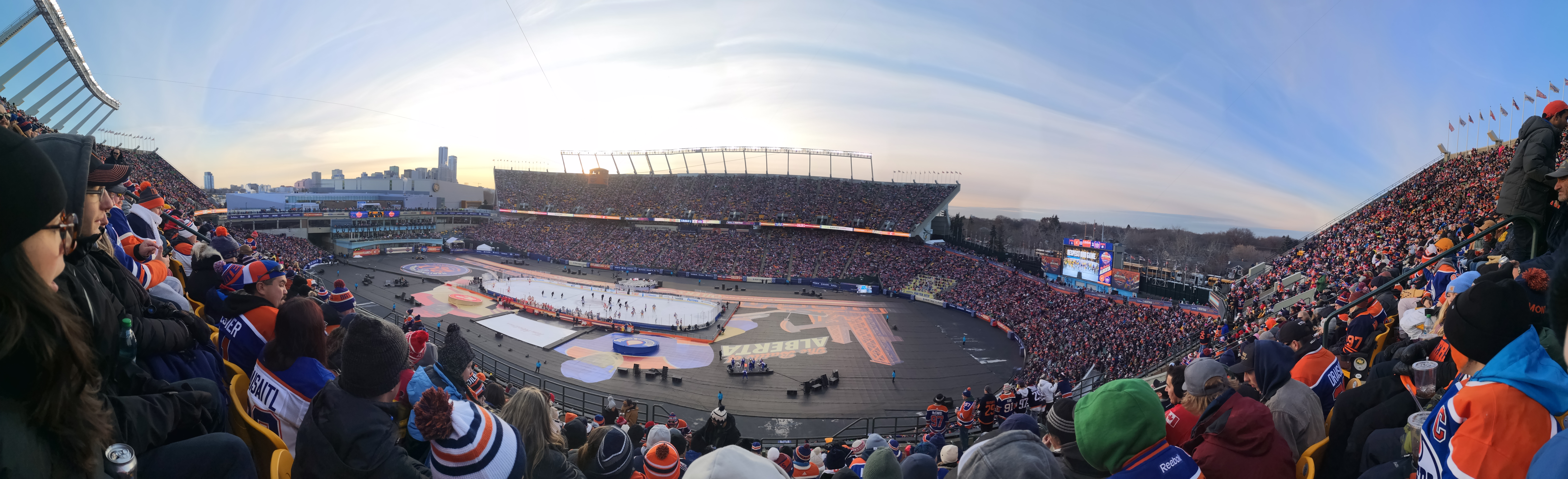
Panorama from the first period

== Game summary ==
October 29	Calgary Flames	2–5	Edmonton Oilers	Commonwealth Stadium	Recap

Scoring summary
Period	Team	Goal	Assist(s)	Time	Score
1st	EDM	Brett Kulak (1)	Evander Kane (3) and Ryan Nugent-Hopkins (5)	04:19	1–0 EDM
1st	EDM	Zach Hyman (3)	Leon Draisaitl (8)	09:38	2–0 EDM
1st	CGY	Nazem Kadri (1) – pp	MacKenzie Weegar (1) and Jonathan Huberdeau (3)	14:55	2–1 EDM
1st	EDM	Evan Bouchard (3)	Leon Draisaitl (9) and Connor McDavid (7)	16:06	3–1 EDM
2nd	CGY	A.J. Greer (1) – pp	MacKenzie Weegar (2) and Jacob Markstrom (1)	11:28	3–2 EDM
3rd	EDM	Vincent Desharnais (1)	Evander Kane (4) and Zach Hyman (6)	06:16	4–2 EDM
3rd	EDM	Evander Kane (2) – en	Derek Ryan (1)	19:13	5–2 EDM

Number in parentheses represents the player's total in goals or assists to that point of the season

Penalty summary
Period	Team	Player	Penalty	Time	PIM
1st	EDM	Evander Kane	Boarding	06:46	2:00
1st	EDM	Leon Draisaitl	Playing with a broken stick	07:25	2:00
1st	EDM	Ryan Nugent-Hopkins	Holding	12:56	2:00
1st	EDM	Darnell Nurse	Roughing	13:30	2:00
1st	CGY	Blake Coleman	Interference	17:55	2:00
2nd	EDM	Vincent Desharnais	Interference	09:28	2:00
3rd	CGY	Dennis Gilbert	Holding	07:05	2:00
3rd	EDM	Evander Kane	Tripping	12:35	2:00

Shots by period
Team	1	2	3	Total
CGY	7	9	10	26
EDM	15	14	5	34

Power play opportunities
Team	Goals/Opportunities
Calgary	2/6
Edmonton	0/2

Three star selections
	Team	Player	Statistics
1st	EDM	Zach Hyman	1 goal, 1 assist
2nd	EDM	Leon Draisaitl	2 assists, 2 penalty minutes
3rd	CGY	MacKenzie Weegar	2 assists

== Team rosters ==
Calgary Flames
#		Player	Position
8	(Canada)	Chris Tanev (A)	D
10	(Canada)	Jonathan Huberdeau (A)	C
11	(Sweden)	Mikael Backlund (C)	C
15	(Canada)	Dryden Hunt	LW
16	(Russia)	Nikita Zadorov	D
17	(Belarus)	Yegor Sharangovich	C
18	(Canada)	A.J. Greer	LW
20	(United States)	Blake Coleman	C
25	(Sweden)	Jacob Markstrom	G
27	(United States)	Matthew Coronato	RW
28	(Sweden)	Elias Lindholm	C
29	(Canada)	Dillon Dube	C
48	(United States)	Dennis Gilbert	D
52	(Canada)	Mackenzie Weegar	D
55	(United States)	Noah Hanifin	D
71	(United States)	Walker Duehr	RW
80	(Czech Republic)	Dan Vladar^{2}	G
88	(Canada)	Andrew Mangiapane	LW
91	(Canada)	Nazem Kadri	C
98	(Belarus)	Ilya Solovyov	D
Head coach: (Canada) Ryan Huska

Edmonton Oilers
#		Player	Position
2	(Canada)	Evan Bouchard	D
5	(Canada)	Cody Ceci	D
10	(United States)	Derek Ryan	C
14	(Sweden)	Mattias Ekholm	D
18	(Canada)	Zach Hyman	LW
21	(United States)	Adam Erne	LW
25	(Canada)	Darnell Nurse	D
27	(Canada)	Brett Kulak	D
28	(Canada)	Connor Brown	RW
29	(Germany)	Leon Draisaitl (A)	C
36	(United States)	Jack Campbell^{1}	G
37	(Canada)	Warren Foegele	LW
55	(Canada)	Dylan Holloway	LW
71	(Canada)	Ryan McLeod	C
73	(Canada)	Vincent Desharnais	D
74	(Canada)	Stuart Skinner	G
86	(Sweden)	Philip Broberg	D
91	(Canada)	Evander Kane	LW
93	(Canada)	Ryan Nugent-Hopkins (A)	C
97	(Canada)	Connor McDavid (C)	C
Head coach: (Canada) Jay Woodcroft

^1 Jack Campbell dressed for the Edmonton Oilers as the back-up goalie and did not enter the game.
^2 Dan Vladar dressed for the Calgary Flames as the back-up goalie and did not enter the game.

=== Scratches ===
- Calgary Flames: Rasmus Andersson, Adam Ruzicka, Jordan Oesterle
- Edmonton Oilers: Mattias Janmark

== Entertainment ==
Country singer and Alberta native Brett Kissel sang the Canadian national anthem, which marked his second time performing the anthem at the Heritage Classic, after doing so in 2016 alongside Doc Walker. Canadian indie rock band The Rural Alberta Advantage performed during team introductions (and also served as the house band at the game as well).

Following the anthem, the ceremonial face-off consisted of alumni players who played in the 2003 game at Commonwealth. For the Canadiens: Jose Theodore, Steve Begin, and Stephane Quintal and for the Oilers: Charlie Huddy, Ales Hemsky, and Jarret Stoll.

Rock group and Alberta natives Nickelback performed during the second intermission. The setlist included their version of "Saturday Night's Alright (For Fighting)" by Elton John and their chart topping songs "How You Remind Me" and "Rockstar".

== Broadcasting ==
In Canada, the 2023 Heritage Classic was broadcast on Sportsnet. In the United States, the game was broadcast on TBS in lieu of TNT, due to the latter airing the second game of a women's international soccer friendly series between the United States and Colombia. The game marked TBS' first NHL regular season broadcast. The game was streamed on Sportsnet+ in Canada and on Max in the United States.
