= Princess Auto Stadium =

Stadium in Winnipeg, Manitoba, Canada

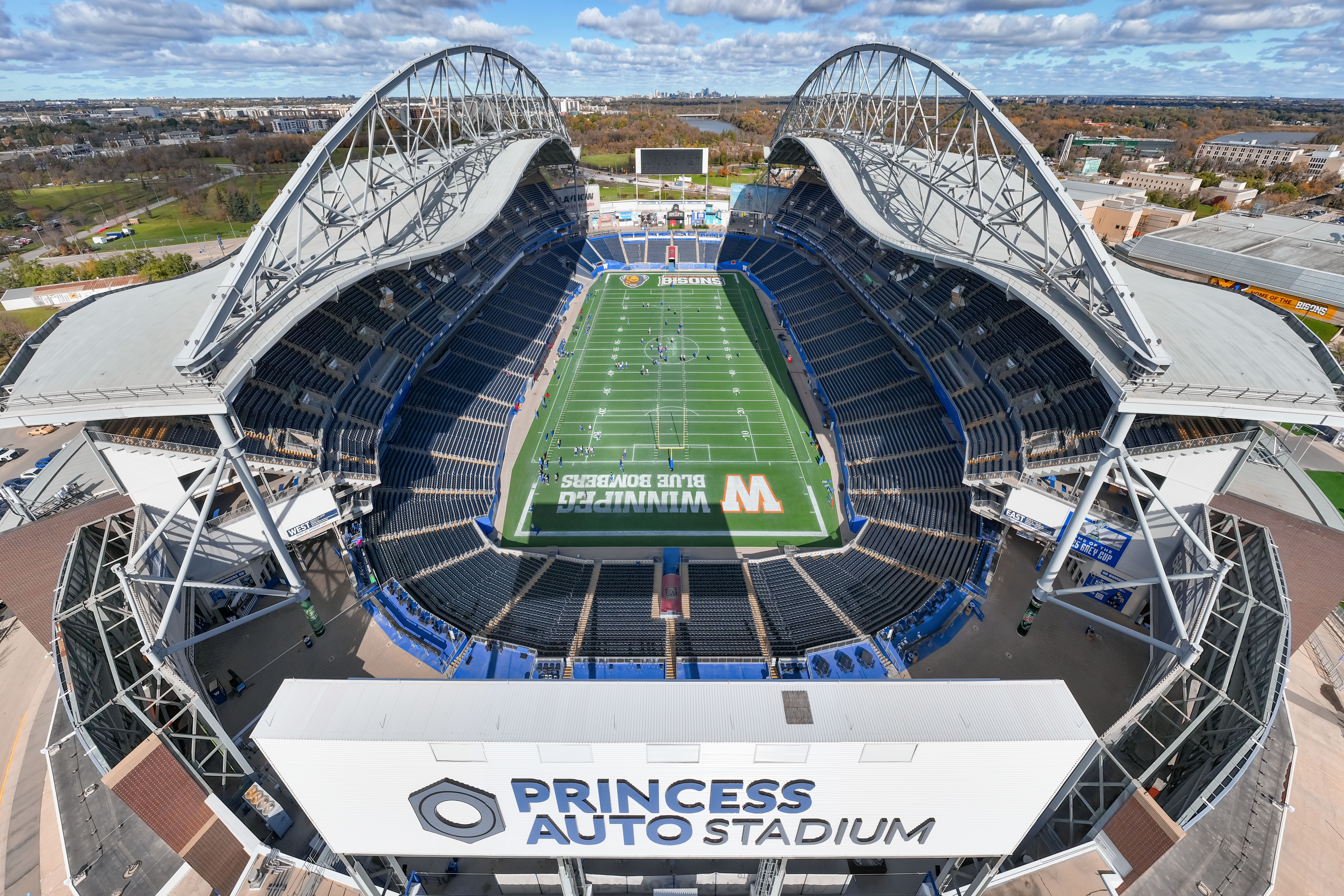
- Princess Auto Stadium in 2025

- Location in Manitoba Location in Canada
- Former names: Investors Group Field (2013–19); IG Field (2019–24)
- Location: University of Manitoba, 315 Chancellor Matheson Road, Winnipeg, Manitoba, Canada
- Coordinates: 49°48′28″N 97°8′35″W
- Owner: Triple B Stadium Inc. (corporation controlled by the Winnipeg Football Club)
- Operator: Winnipeg Football Club
- Capacity: 32,343
- Executive suites: 46
- Surface: FieldTurf Vertex
- Acreage: 8 hectares (20 acres)
- Public transit: Winnipeg Transit; BLUE F8 F9 74 679 889

Construction
- Groundbreaking: May 20, 2010
- Opened: May 26, 2013
- Cost: $210 million
- Architect: Raymond S. C. Wan
- Builder: Stuart Olson Dominion Construction

Tenants
- Winnipeg Blue Bombers (CFL) (2013–present); Manitoba Bisons (U Sports) (2013–present); Winnipeg Rifles (CJFL) (2013–2019); Valour FC (CPL) (2019–2025); Manitoba Fearless (WWCFL) (2013–2019)

Princess Auto Stadium (formerly IG Field) is an outdoor stadium in Winnipeg, Manitoba, Canada. The stadium, which opened in 2013, is located on the University of Manitoba campus next to University Stadium.

The stadium is home to the Winnipeg Blue Bombers of the Canadian Football League (CFL). It is also home to the University of Manitoba Bisons football team, the Winnipeg Rifles of the Canadian Junior Football League (CJFL), the Manitoba Fearless of the Western Women's Canadian Football League (WWCFL), and was a host stadium of the 2015 FIFA Women's World Cup.

The stadium has a capacity of 32,343 and is partially covered. The stadium contains a corrugated metal roof, restaurant, 52 suites, walk of fame and other amenities.

== Ownership ==
The stadium is owned by Triple B Stadium Inc., a non-share corporation incorporated in Manitoba on November 19, 2010. The object of this corporation is to develop, construct and operate a stadium at the University of Manitoba for the Winnipeg Football Club, the University of Manitoba Bisons, amateur athletics, and other public purposes.

Currently, the Winnipeg Football Club has sole control over Triple B Stadium Inc. Originally, Triple B Stadium Inc. was owned by a consortium of the City of Winnipeg, the Province of Manitoba, the Winnipeg Football Club and the University of Manitoba.

== History ==
=== Development ===
The owners of Canad Inns, a Winnipeg-based hotel business and naming rights holder for the Blue Bombers' former stadium, forwarded a plan in 2007 to redevelop the entire site for commercial use and construct a football stadium for the Blue Bombers in another location. This proposal, although rejected in favour of David Asper's plan, called for a $265 million stadium at the former Public Markets site in the St. Boniface industrial park, which Canad Inns purchased from the city. The domed stadium would have been part of a $500 million complex that would have included a four-star hotel and an indoor water park.

David Asper's original proposal involved both federal and provincial government financial contributions ($40 million each), as well as a transfer of assets (the publicly owned Blue Bomber franchise itself will be transferred into Asper's control, and the existing undeveloped commercial real estate surrounding the stadium). As part of Creswin's commitment to the project, Asper pledged to contribute $65 million toward the Maroons Road development. In addition to stadium construction, the Asper proposal included 217,000 sq ft (20,200 m^{2}) of retail development and a two-level parking facility.

Logo from 2013 to 2019

Logo from 2019 to 2024

The Blue Bombers' board of directors investigated the possibility of rebuilding or substantially upgrading the existing stadium, largely with funds generated from the sale or lease of the adjacent commercial lands (the team holds the right to develop this property itself as part of its refinancing agreement with the city of Winnipeg and province of Manitoba). However, being a community owned business, the Bombers organization would have had difficulty in accessing the capital required to move forward with such plans directly. The board placed its plans on hold pending the outcome of Asper's proposal.

The government was unwilling to grant Asper the $40 million at both the provincial and federal levels because it believed the money to be more of a gift than a grant. Creswin drew up a second proposal, where the same 30,000–40,000-seat stadium would be built instead in south Point Douglas. This new plan, they said, would greatly aid in urban renewal in what is the poorest neighborhood in Winnipeg. There was also a state-of-the-art water park and hotel, commercial buildings and several other new buildings in the multimillion-dollar proposal. However, there was controversy as well because south Point Douglas is an avid art community, and many of the residents did not want their character buildings to be destroyed or suffer the loss of their homes.

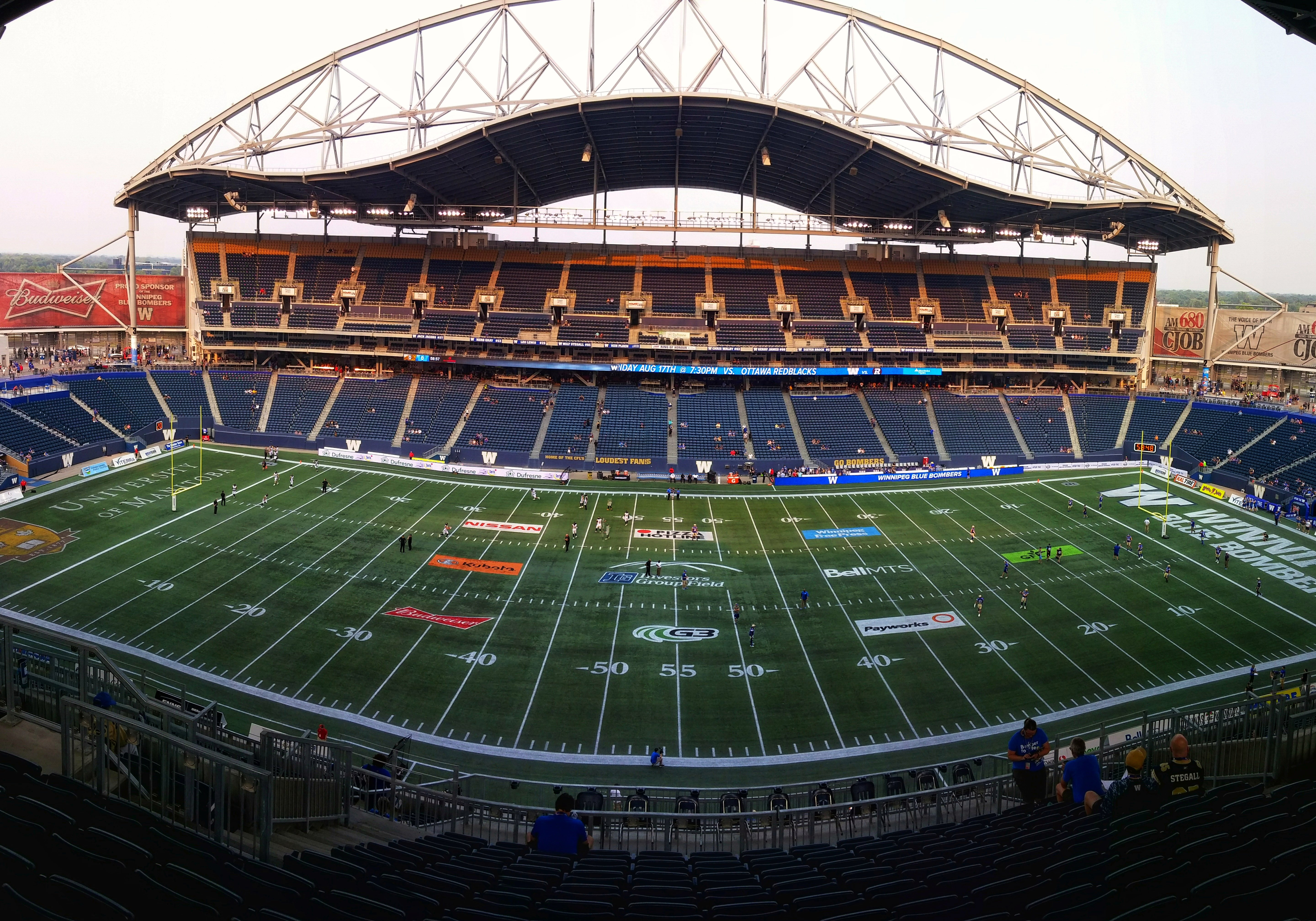
Inside IG Field in 2018

A letter of intent was signed on September 13, 2009, between Asper's Creswin Properties and the University of Manitoba, allowing planning to continue for a stadium at the intersection of Chancellor Matheson Drive and University Crescent. The site is adjacent to the current University Stadium, which was built for the 1967 Pan American Games. The new proposal includes the construction of a 33,422-seat stadium, renovation of the existing stadium, and a world-class fitness facility. Inflatable "bubbles" covering the playing field were also proposed for both stadiums during the winter months. The cost of the new stadium was projected to be $115 million.

The new stadium would also be home of the University of Manitoba Bisons football team. The design allows for expansion to 40,000 seats for the Grey Cup (however for the 2015 Grey Cup 36,500 seats were available). The stadium was approved on 2 April 2009. The province of Manitoba later agreed to loan David Asper $90 million in order to guarantee the project would break ground in 2010 and ensure the stadium would open for 2012. CFL Commissioner Mark Cohon, Premier of Manitoba Greg Selinger, David Asper, Mayor of Winnipeg Sam Katz and U of M President David Barnard officially broke ground at the site on May 20, 2010.

Asper and Creswin were removed from the deal as they made significant changes to the stadium design which broke the original contract. The revised cost amounted to $190 million, with the Winnipeg Blue Bombers paying back $85 million, and the provincial and city levels of government splitting the rest of the costs as previously proposed.

The naming rights were awarded to Investors Group, the leading subsidiary of Winnipeg-based IGM Financial, branding it as Investors Group Field. After the corporate rebranding of Investors Group as IG Wealth Management, the name of the stadium was shortened to IG Field in 2018.

In January 2024, the team announced a 10-year naming rights agreement with Winnipeg-based auto parts chain Princess Auto beginning in April 2024, renaming it Princess Auto Stadium. The stadium also underwent a $2 million refurbishment ahead of the 2024 Blue Bombers season and in preparation for the 112th Grey Cup, including replacing its original FieldTurf Revolution playing surface with FieldTurf Vertex.

=== Controversy ===
The new stadium was expected to be ready for the start of the 2012 season. However, on May 2, 2012, the Blue Bombers announced that because of construction delays, the stadium would not be ready until September, thus forcing the team to play four or five home games at Canad Inns Stadium to start the season. In June 2012, it was announced the stadium would not open until the 2013 season. In December 2013, it was reported the previously announced inflatable dome had been dropped from the plans in 2012.

In 2014, the builder, Stuart Olson Dominion, put a $1.9 million lien on the stadium because it claimed it was owed for some of the cost overruns. This dispute was resolved later that year, with the province contributing an additional $1.5 million to cover additional costs incurred during construction, bringing the total cost to $210 million.

On March 4, 2015, the stadium's ownership group, Triple B Stadium Inc., announced its intention to sue architect Ray Wan and builder Stuart Olson Dominion. In the statement of claim, it cited water damage caused by insufficient drainage in the building, as well as inadequate insulation and "extensive" cracking in the concrete among a total of 42 deficiencies. On April 23, Stuart Olson filed a statement of defence denying most of Triple B's allegations, stating the shell company — which represents the city, province, university and the Winnipeg Football Club — made all the key construction decisions, in concert with the province, which paid for most of the construction up front. Stuart Olson also alleged political and financial factors led the province to rush the job and reduce its budget.

On October 27, 2015, the government of Manitoba announced it would pay $35 million to repair the stadium. It would then seek compensation for this further outlay of money from the proceeds of the aforementioned lawsuit.

== Notable events ==
=== Canadian football ===
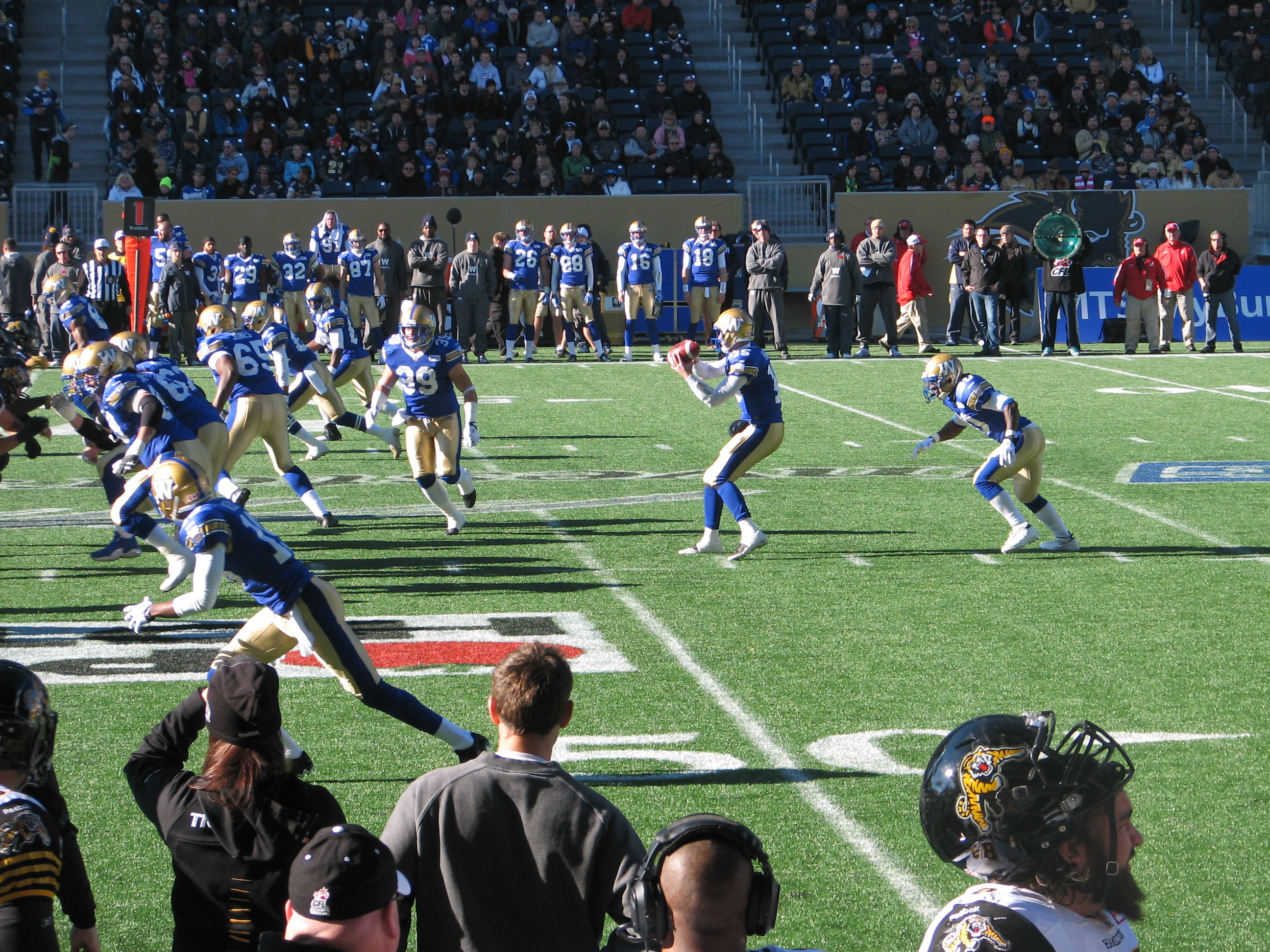
An in-game photo of the Winnipeg Blue Bombers on offence against the Hamilton Tiger-Cats.

The Blue Bombers played their first home game at Investors Group Field on June 27, 2013, losing 38–33 to the Montreal Alouettes.

The stadium hosted the 103rd Grey Cup in 2015 and the 112th Grey Cup in 2025.

=== Soccer ===
On May 8, 2014, the Canadian women's national team played the United States in the first soccer match at Investors Group Field, finishing in a 1–1 draw.

In June 2015, Winnipeg was one of six Canadian cities that hosted the FIFA Women's World Cup. The first four matches of Group D—between the United States, Australia, Sweden and Nigeria—were contested at Investors Group Field, followed by three matches from other groups (Germany v Thailand, New Zealand v China, and Japan v Ecuador.) Due to FIFA sponsorship rules, the venue was referred to as Winnipeg Stadium during the World Cup.

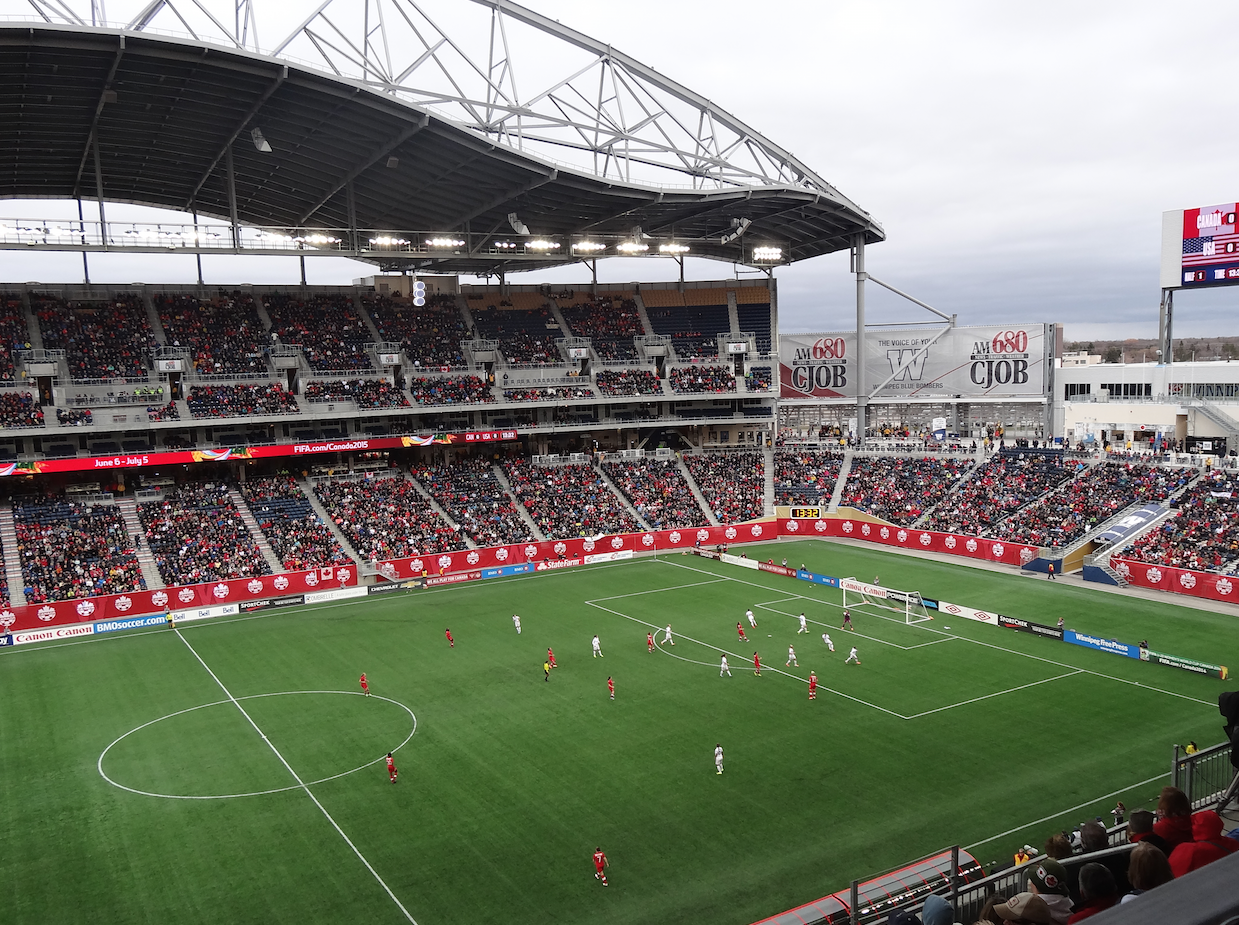
The Canada vs United States women's soccer game exhibition played in May 2014 to a 1–1 draw.

In 2019, IG Field became the home of Valour FC in the Canadian Premier League. In the 2021 Canadian Premier League season, the field hosted a bio-secure bubble for the initial matches of the season ("The Kickoff") due to the COVID-19 pandemic. All matches were played behind closed doors and in compliance with provincial public health orders. Valour FC suspended operations following the 2025 season.

2015 FIFA Women's World Cup

Date	Team #1	Result	Team #2	Round	Attendance
June 8, 2015	Sweden	3–3	Nigeria	Group D	31,148
June 8, 2015	United States	3–1	Australia	Group D	31,148
June 12, 2015	Australia	2–0	Nigeria	Group D	32,716
June 12, 2015	United States	0–0	Sweden	Group D	32,716
June 15, 2015	Germany	4–0	Thailand	Group B	26,191
June 15, 2015	China	2–2	New Zealand	Group A	26,191
June 16, 2015	Ecuador	0–1	Japan	Group C	14,522

=== Ice hockey ===
Investors Group Field hosted the fourth installment of the National Hockey League (NHL)'s Heritage Classic on October 23, 2016, in which the Winnipeg Jets lost 3–0 to the Edmonton Oilers in front of a sold-out crowd. The Classic's customary alumni game was played a day earlier and featured players from the original Jets franchise returning to Winnipeg to play the Oilers alumni team. The Jets alumni, led by Teemu Selänne and Dale Hawerchuk, defeated Wayne Gretzky's Oilers squad 6–5.

Princess Auto Stadium hosted the eighth installment of the NHL's Heritage Classic on October 25, 2026, in which the Winnipeg Jets lost 1–2 to the Montreal Canadiens in front of a sold-out crowd.

=== American football ===
IG Field hosted an NFL preseason game between the Green Bay Packers and Oakland Raiders on August 22, 2019. The teams largely avoided playing starters in the game. In attempting to move the goalposts back five yards to put them behind the endzone—as is customary in American football—it left holes in each end zone that the NFL deemed a safety hazard. Since this discovery came too late to put the goalposts back and repaint the field, each ten-yard line was hastily converted to a goal line by adding pylons to shorten the field to 80 yards (from the standard 100 yard field/10 yard endzones used for American football), and kickoffs were eliminated. The changes did not have an appreciable impact on the game according to Raiders coach Jon Gruden, and most of the coaches and players otherwise praised IG Field's playing surface.

Date	Away	Score	Home	Ref.
August 22, 2019	Green Bay Packers	21–22	Oakland Raiders	Recap

=== Concerts ===
Date	Artist(s)	Opening act(s)	Tour	Tickets sold	Revenue	Additional notes
June 22, 2013	Taylor Swift	Ed Sheeran; Austin Mahone; Joel Crouse	The Red Tour	33,061 / 33,061	$3,175,430	The stadium's first concert.
August 12, 2013	Paul McCartney	—	Out There	30,149 / 30,149	$4,079,490	"Mull of Kintyre" was performed with the City of Winnipeg Police Pipe Band.
July 27, 2014	Beyoncé; Jay Z	—	On the Run Tour	29,542 / 29,542	$3,187,580	—N/a
July 24, 2015	One Direction	Icona Pop	On the Road Again Tour	24,991 / 24,991	$1,872,587	The band performed a cover of "Happy Birthday" by Mildred J. Hill and Liam Payne and "Hero" by Enrique Iglesias.
September 17, 2015	AC/DC	Vintage Trouble	Rock or Bust World Tour	34,000 / 34,000	—	—N/a
August 24, 2017	Guns N' Roses	Our Lady Peace	Not In This Lifetime... Tour	30,741 / 30,741	$3,008,250	A cover of Black Hole Sun by Soundgarden was performed as a tribute to Chris Cornell
July 9, 2025	Def Leppard	Joan Jett and the Blackhearts; Foreigner; Toque	Rockin' Thunder			Played as part of Thunder Stadium Concert Series
July 10, 2025	Riley Green	Tyler Hubbard; Nate Smith; Madeline Merlo	Country Thunder			Played as part of Thunder Stadium Concert Series

=== Other events ===
The stadium hosted its first event on May 26, 2013, with the One Heart Winnipeg celebration, a multi-denominational church service organized by several local church groups.

Nitro Circus Live came to the stadium in 2017.

== See also ==
- List of Canadian Premier League stadiums
- List of Canadian Football League stadiums
- Lists of stadiums

Events and tenants
Preceded by Canad Inns Stadium	Home of the Winnipeg Blue Bombers; 2013–present	Succeeded by Current stadium
Preceded by University Stadium	Home of the Manitoba Bisons football team 2013–present	Succeeded by Current stadium
