= T. J. Brodie =

Canadian ice hockey player (born 1990)

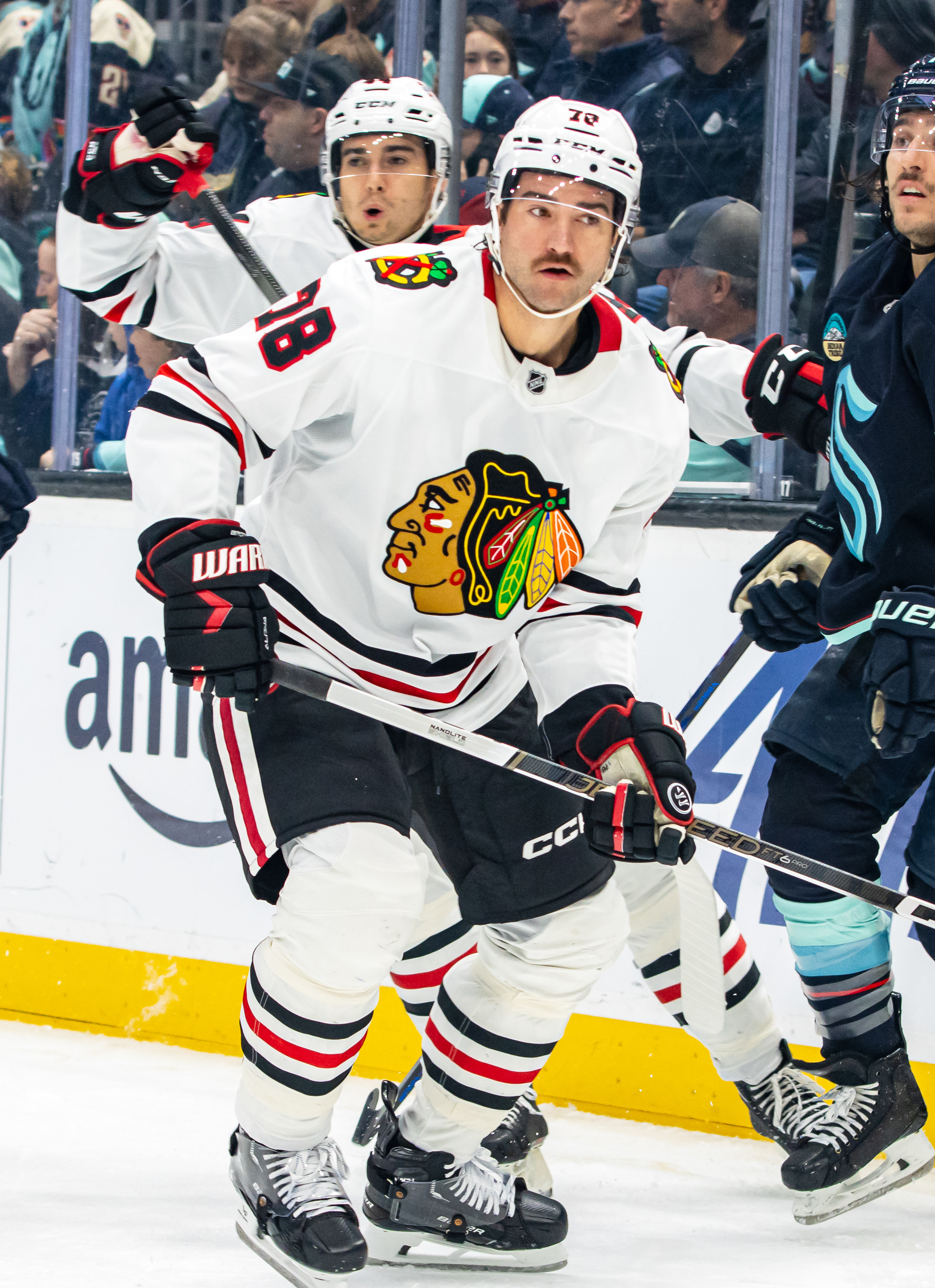
- Brodie in his lone season with the Chicago Blackhawks, 2024
- Born: June 7, 1990 (age 36) Chatham, Ontario, Canada
- Height: 6 ft 1 in (185 cm)
- Weight: 183 lb (83 kg; 13 st 1 lb)
- Position: Defence
- Shot: Left
- Played for: Calgary Flames; Toronto Maple Leafs; Chicago Blackhawks
- National team: Canada
- NHL draft: 114th overall, 2008; Calgary Flames
- Playing career: 2010–2025

Thomas James Brodie (born June 7, 1990) is a Canadian former professional ice hockey defenceman who spent parts of fifteen seasons in the National Hockey League (NHL), ten of which were with the Calgary Flames. Originally a fourth-round selection of the Flames (114th overall) in the 2008 NHL entry draft, Brodie played four seasons in the Ontario Hockey League (OHL) prior to turning professional in 2010. In the latter half of his career, he also spent notable time with the Toronto Maple Leafs before playing a final year with the Chicago Blackhawks. Internationally, he has represented Canada at the 2013 IIHF World Championship.

== Personal ==
Brodie grew up in Ontario on the family farm located between Dresden and Chatham. His cousin, Ian Badder, was diagnosed with cystic fibrosis as a child and underwent a life-saving double-lung transplant in 2011. In support, Brodie wore some stylish suits at the Catwalk for a Cure fashion show in July 2014 that raised more than $15,000 for Cystic Fibrosis Canada. He is also selling footwear with T. J. Brodie: Skate in Strides for Cystic Fibrosis. The Calgary Flames are helping him sell skate guards to raise money for Cystic Fibrosis Canada.

Brodie is married to Amber DeBakker, who was diagnosed with multiple sclerosis in October 2015. He and DeBakker have two children together.

== Playing career ==
=== Amateur ===
Brodie attended elementary school and high school in Chatham, but played his minor hockey in the Dresden Minor Hockey Association. In 2002, when he was 11 years old, he was invited to participate in the Toronto Maple Leafs Skills Challenge and participated in the accuracy shooting drill where he shot 4 for 4.

Brodie was selected by the Saginaw Spirit in the third round of the Ontario Hockey League (OHL) priority selection in 2006, but opted out of the Cyclones program and spent the majority of the 2006–07 season with the Junior B Leamington Flyers, where he was voted the defensive rookie of the year and named to the rookie and first all-star teams in the Western Ontario Hockey League. He also appeared in 20 games with the Spirit before moving up to the OHL full-time in the 2007–08 season. He appeared in all 68 games for the Spirit that year, scoring 30 points as a 17-year-old. Seeking an offensive defenceman, the Calgary Flames selected Brodie in the fourth round, 114th overall, at the 2008 NHL entry draft.

Brodie improved to 50 points in 2008–09 and was praised by his coaches as being one of the best all-around defencemen in the OHL. His season earned the attention of Hockey Canada, which invited him to their summer evaluation camp for the 2010 World Junior Ice Hockey Championships. Brodie began the 2009–10 season in Saginaw but was traded to the Barrie Colts after 19 games as part of a four-player deal. The Colts finished the year as the top-ranked team in the Canadian Hockey League (CHL), but were defeated by the Windsor Spitfires in the OHL championship series.

=== Professional ===
==== Calgary Flames ====
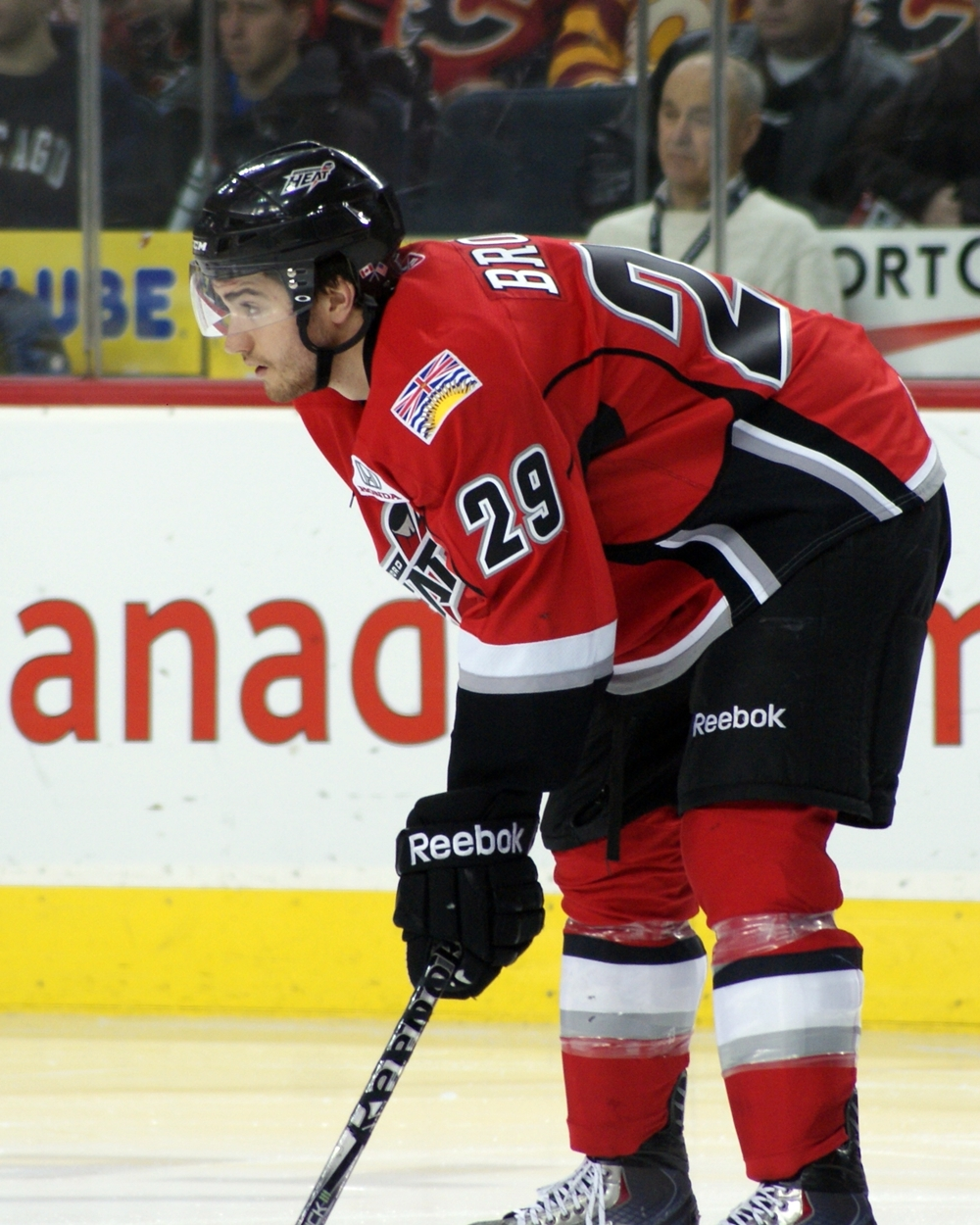
Brodie with the Abbotsford Heat in February 2011

Entering his 20-year-old season, the Flames expected Brodie was ready to turn professional in 2010–11. The team praised the improvements he made to his game, and anticipated that he would join their American Hockey League (AHL) affiliate, the Abbotsford Heat. A strong showing at the team's rookie camp, and performances in the main camp that impressed both his coaches and teammates, resulted in Brodie earning a spot with the Flames to begin the season. He appeared in three games, recording two penalty minutes, before being assigned to Abbotsford. TJ Brodie and New York Islanders player Josh Ho-Sang both have chosen to wear sweater #66, after Pittsburgh Penguins superstar Mario Lemieux, in a regular season game.

Brodie established himself as one of the Heat's top scorers and was considered one of the team's top prospects. Brodie's play was such that he was named the team's lone representative at the 2011 AHL All-Star Game. He finished the year as Abbotsford's leading scorer amongst defencemen, and tied for second on the team overall, with 34 points. He led the Heat in assists with 29.

Brodie began the 2011–12 season in Abbotsford, but an injury to Anton Babchuk led to his recall by the Flames on November 11, 2011. He scored his first NHL point by assisting on a goal by Lee Stempniak against the Chicago Blackhawks on November 18. Brodie's first NHL goal nine days later against goaltender Niklas Bäckström of the Minnesota Wild when an attempted pass to Tim Jackman was deflected into the goal. Brodie played 54 games in his first NHL season, scoring 14 points.

Due to the 2012–13 NHL lockout, Brodie began the 2012–13 season in Abbotsford. He scored 20 points in 35 games with the Heat before NHL play resumed. Finishing the season with the Flames, he scored 2 goals and 14 points in 47 games. He emerged as one of the Flames' top defencemen, averaging over 20 minutes of ice time per game and earning an invitation to join Team Canada at the 2013 IIHF World Championship. Brodie appeared in seven games and recorded one assist for Canada, who were eliminated in the quarterfinals of the tournament.

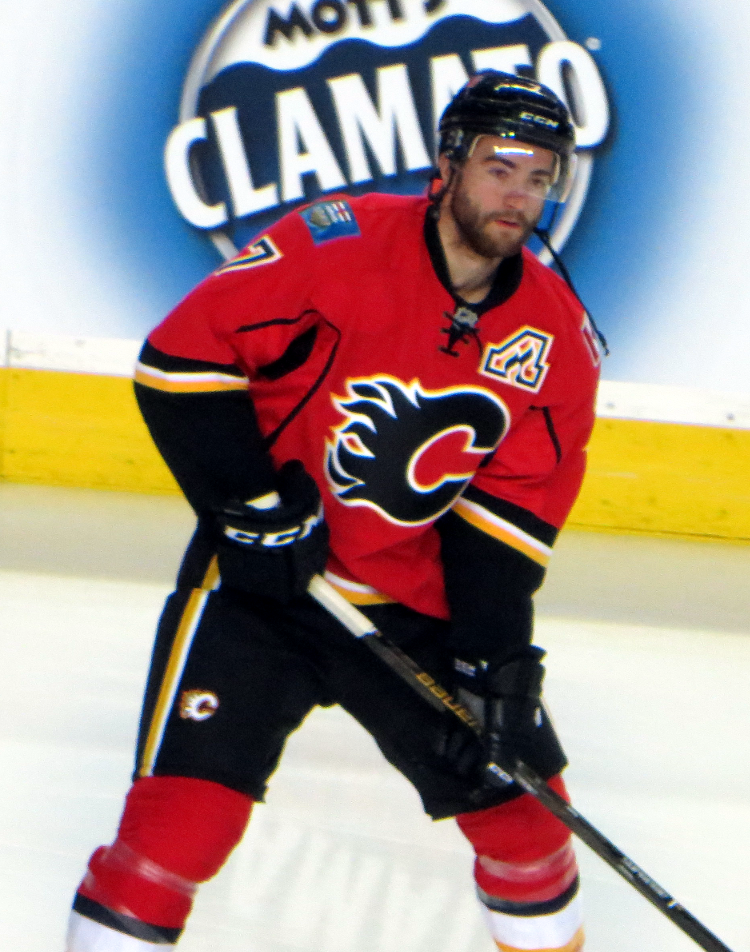
Brodie with the Calgary Flames in February 2016.

A restricted free agent following the season, Brodie signed a two-year, $4.25 million contract extension with the Flames. He began the 2013–14 season alongside Mark Giordano as the Flames' top defensive pairing. On October 20, 2014, the Flames signed Brodie to a five-year, $23.25 million contract extension worth $4.65 million annually.

Before the 2015–16 season opener, Brodie broke his right hand and was sidelined for five weeks. He returned for an away game against the Ottawa Senators, which the Flames lost 5–4 in a shootout. In the game, Brodie logged 25:10 of ice time, the third-highest total on the team.

On February 3, 2017, Brodie achieved his first four-point game, coming against the New Jersey Devils in a 4–3 overtime win.

On October 7, 2017, Brodie scored his second multi-point game. It was also the second time in his career he's had a four-point game, though the first time they were all assists.

==== Toronto Maple Leafs ====
On October 9, 2020, after spending the first 10 years of his NHL career with the Calgary Flames, Brodie left the club as a free agent and was signed to a four-year, $20 million contract with the Toronto Maple Leafs. The Leafs also added other veteran presences to their lineup including Joe Thornton and Wayne Simmonds prior to the start of the shortened 2020–21 NHL season.

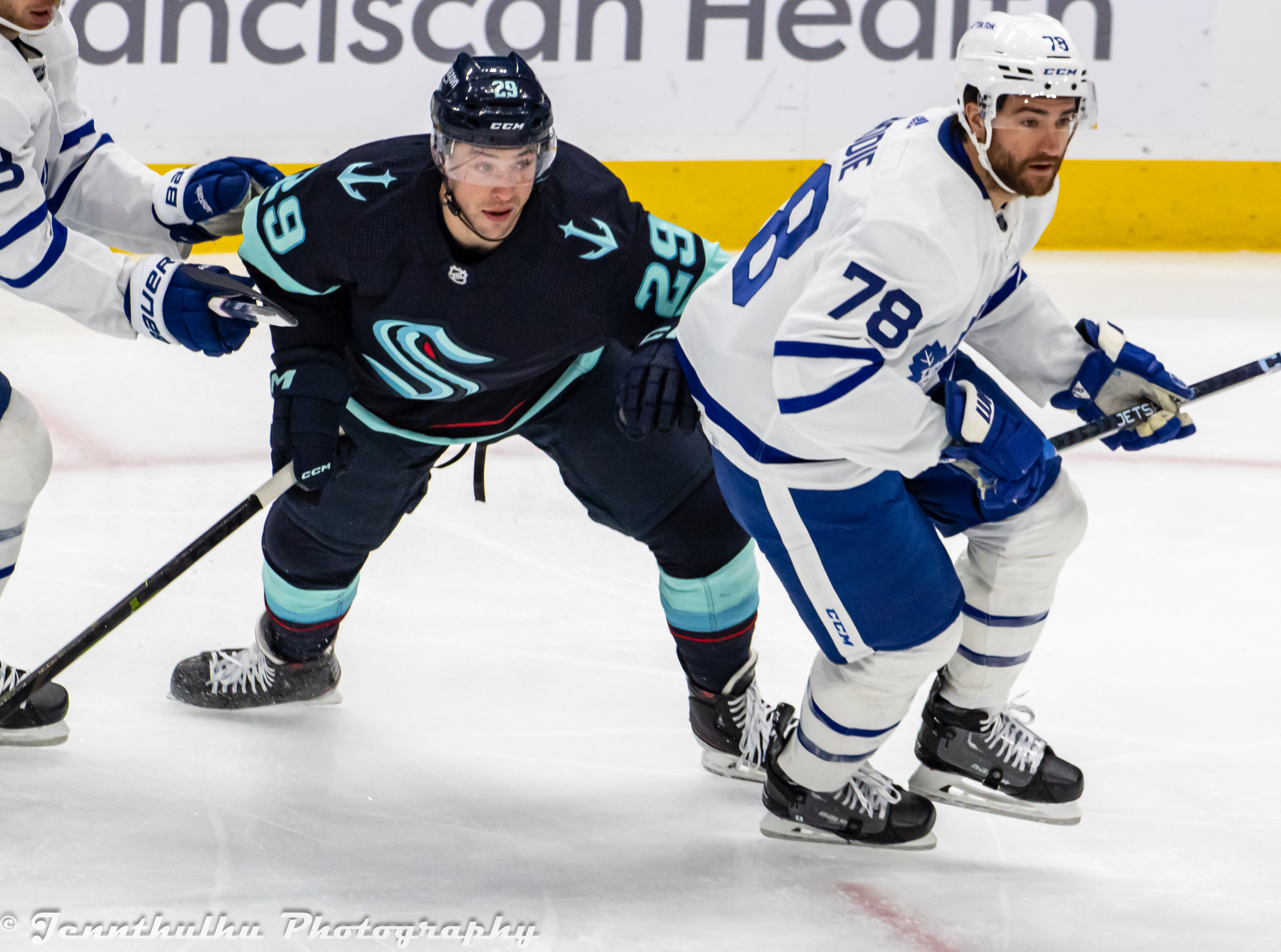
Brodie and Vince Dunn during a game in February 2023.

Brodie played limited games during the 2022–23 season due to various injuries. He pulled himself out of the lineup during warmups on November 12 and was later diagnosed with an oblique injury. He missed 12 games to recover before returning to the lineup on December 8 prior to a game against the Los Angeles Kings. During his absence, the Maple Leafs maintained a record of 9–0–3. However, his return to the lineup was shortlived as he was placed on injured reserve on January 10 due to a rib issue. He was activated off injured reserve nearly two weeks later on January 29.

==== Chicago Blackhawks ====
At the conclusion of his four-year tenure with the Maple Leafs, Brodie left as a free agent and was signed to a two-year, $7.5 million contract with the Chicago Blackhawks on July 1, 2024. In his first season with the Blackhawks in 2024–25, Brodie struggled to replicate his previous defensive prowess on the blueline, and was limited to just 54 regular season games in posting 2 goals and 10 points.

On June 21, 2025, Brodie was placed on unconditional waivers by the Blackhawks for the purpose of buying out the remaining year of his contract. Upon clearing waivers, Brodie was released by the Blackhawks as a free agent the following day.

==== Retirement ====
After not being signed to a contract for the 2025–26 season by any NHL team following his buyout from the Blackhawks, Brodie was reported on April 13, 2026 to be enjoying a quiet retirement in Lakeshore, Ontario. He was also reported to be participating in beer league hockey.

== Career statistics ==
=== Regular season and playoffs ===
			Regular season					Playoffs
Season	Team	League	GP	G	A	Pts	PIM	GP	G	A	Pts	PIM
2006–07	Leamington Flyers	WOHL	43	8	38	46	104	5	1	2	3	12
2006–07	Saginaw Spirit	OHL	20	0	4	4	23	3	0	1	1	2
2007–08	Saginaw Spirit	OHL	68	4	26	30	73	4	0	3	3	2
2008–09	Saginaw Spirit	OHL	63	12	38	50	67	8	3	6	9	8
2009–10	Saginaw Spirit	OHL	19	4	19	23	20	—	—	—	—	—
2009–10	Barrie Colts	OHL	46	3	30	33	38	17	1	14	15	14
2010–11	Calgary Flames	NHL	3	0	0	0	2	—	—	—	—	—
2010–11	Abbotsford Heat	AHL	68	5	29	34	32	—	—	—	—	—
2011–12	Abbotsford Heat	AHL	12	1	2	3	10	—	—	—	—	—
2011–12	Calgary Flames	NHL	54	2	12	14	16	—	—	—	—	—
2012–13	Abbotsford Heat	AHL	35	1	19	20	22	—	—	—	—	—
2012–13	Calgary Flames	NHL	47	2	12	14	8	—	—	—	—	—
2013–14	Calgary Flames	NHL	81	4	27	31	20	—	—	—	—	—
2014–15	Calgary Flames	NHL	81	11	30	41	30	11	1	4	5	0
2015–16	Calgary Flames	NHL	70	6	39	45	18	—	—	—	—	—
2016–17	Calgary Flames	NHL	82	6	30	36	24	4	0	4	4	2
2017–18	Calgary Flames	NHL	73	4	28	32	18	—	—	—	—	—
2018–19	Calgary Flames	NHL	79	9	25	34	24	5	2	0	2	6
2019–20	Calgary Flames	NHL	65	4	15	19	36	10	1	3	4	6
2020–21	Toronto Maple Leafs	NHL	56	1	13	14	12	7	1	1	2	4
2021–22	Toronto Maple Leafs	NHL	82	4	24	28	34	7	0	2	2	6
2022–23	Toronto Maple Leafs	NHL	58	2	12	14	14	11	0	3	3	12
2023–24	Toronto Maple Leafs	NHL	78	1	25	26	40	1	0	0	0	0
2024–25	Chicago Blackhawks	NHL	54	2	8	10	18	—	—	—	—	—
NHL totals			962	58	300	358	312	56	5	17	22	36

=== International ===
Year	Team	Event	Result	GP	G	A	Pts	PIM
2013	Canada	WC	5th	7	0	1	1	0
Senior totals				7	0	1	1	0

Career statistics: "TJ Brodie player card". National Hockey League.
