= 2003 NHL Heritage Classic =

Outdoor National Hockey League game

Heritage Classic
	1	2	3	Total
Montreal Canadiens	0	2	2	4
Edmonton Oilers	0	1	2	3
- Date: November 22, 2003
- Venue: Commonwealth Stadium
- City: Edmonton
- Attendance: 57,167

The Heritage Classic was an outdoor ice hockey game played on November 22, 2003, in Edmonton, Alberta, Canada, between the Edmonton Oilers and the Montreal Canadiens. It was the first National Hockey League (NHL) game to be played outdoors as a part of regular season play. The Heritage Classic concept was modelled after the success of the "Cold War" game between the University of Michigan and Michigan State University two years prior.

The event took place in Edmonton's Commonwealth Stadium in front of a crowd of 57,167, despite temperatures of close to −30 °C (−22 °F) with wind chill. It was held to commemorate the 25th anniversary of the Edmonton Oilers joining the NHL in 1979 and the 20th anniversary of their first Stanley Cup win in 1984. The CBC television broadcast drew 2.747 million viewers in Canada, the second-highest audience for a regular-season NHL game. This was the first NHL game broadcast in HD on CBC.

== Preliminary events ==
First, the MegaStars game was played between some of the best former players from both clubs. The Oilers were represented by the best players from their 1980s dynasty, led by Wayne Gretzky. The Canadiens were represented by players from their 1970s dynasty, led by Guy Lafleur, and a few members of the 1986 and 1993 championship squads. Both teams were composed of players who had won Stanley Cups with the Oilers or Canadiens, except for the Oilers' first NHL captain, Ron Chipperfield, and the Canadiens' Russ Courtnall, who Rejean Houle said was selected for his speed. Cam Connor and Mark Napier were the only players that played for both the Oilers and the Canadiens during their NHL careers; both played for the Canadiens during the game. Mark Messier, the only active player at the time, received special permission from the New York Rangers front office to compete for Edmonton in the game. The MegaStars game consisted of two 15-minute halves rather than three 20-minute periods, and was won by the Oilers by a score of 2–0. After the game, Messier jokingly called the low-scoring contest "a typical Oilers win," a reference to the numerous high-scoring games of the Oilers' heyday in the 1980s.

== Regular season game ==
The second game was an official NHL regular season contest between the Edmonton Oilers and the Montreal Canadiens. Montreal won the game 4–3. Richard Zednik of the Canadiens scored the first goal of the game, and also scored the game-winner. Goaltender Jose Theodore wore a Canadiens tuque over the top of his goalie mask.

The game was released to DVD by the CBC, and included special features such as player interviews.

== Inspiration for ongoing outdoor games ==
The first NHL game to be played outdoors was a pre-season exhibition game on September 27, 1991, when the Los Angeles Kings played the New York Rangers outside Caesars Palace in Las Vegas.

Following the success of the 2003 Heritage Classic, the league moved forward with the periodic NHL Heritage Classic series, which – as of the 2023 Heritage Classic (in Edmonton, to mark the 20th anniversary of the original) – have each been hosted by a Canadian NHL team, at a venue in or near the host team's city.

In 2008, the league began the NHL Winter Classic series, an outdoor regular season game played annually on New Year's Day, which to date have all been hosted by an American NHL team, at a venue in or near the host team's city.

In 2014, the league instigated the semi-regular NHL Stadium Series, an outdoor regular season game, which to date have all been hosted by an American NHL team, at a venue in or near the host team's city.

== Game summary ==
Nov 22, 2003	Montreal Canadiens	4–3	Edmonton Oilers	Commonwealth Stadium	Recap

Scoring summary
Period	Team	Goal	Assist(s)	Time	Score
1st	None				
2nd	MTL	Richard Zednik (5)	Patrice Brisebois (7) and Michael Ryder (7)	00:39	1–0 MTL
2nd	MTL	Yanic Perreault (6) – pp	Craig Rivet (8) and Mike Ribeiro (11)	10:53	2–0 MTL
2nd	EDM	Eric Brewer (1)	Jarret Stoll (1) and Steve Staios (7)	13:45	2–1 MTL
3rd	MTL	Yanic Perreault (7)	Niklas Sundstrom (3) and Craig Rivet (4)	2:22	3–1 MTL
3rd	EDM	Jarret Stoll (4)	Steve Staios (8)	13:06	3–2 MTL
3rd	MTL	Richard Zednik (6)	Sheldon Souray (3)	14:18	4–2 MTL
3rd	EDM	Steve Staios (3)	Radek Dvorak (8)	14:57	4–3 MTL

Number in parentheses represents the player's total in goals or assists to that point of the season

Penalty summary
Period	Team	Player	Penalty	Time	PIM
1st	EDM	Cory Cross	High-sticking	13:49	2:00
2nd	EDM	Ryan Smyth	Hooking	09:31	2:00
2nd	MTL	Chad Kilger	Hooking	11:42	2:00
3rd	MTL	Francis Bouillon	Roughing	12:58	2:00
3rd	EDM	Jason Chimera	Roughing	12:58	2:00

Shots by period
Team	1	2	3	Total
Montreal	5	10	8	23
Edmonton	12	16	9	37

Power play opportunities
Team	Goals/Opportunities
Montreal	1/2
Edmonton	0/1

Three star selections
	Team	Player	Statistics
1st	MTL	Yanic Perreault	2 goals
2nd	EDM	Steve Staios	1 goal, 2 assists
3rd	MTL	Richard Zednik	2 goals

== Entertainment ==
During the pre-game ceremony, Wayne Gretzky's daughter Paulina Gretzky performed "I Will Remember You" by Sarah McLachlan while Oilers anthem singer Paul Lorieau performed "O Canada" in English and French along with a choir.

== Team rosters ==
Montreal Canadiens
#		Player	Position
5	(Canada)	Stephane Quintal (A)	D
11	(Finland)	Saku Koivu (C)	C
15	(Canada)	Darren Langdon	LW
20	(Slovakia)	Richard Zednik (A)	RW
22	(Canada)	Steve Begin	C
24	(Sweden)	Andreas Dackell	RW
25	(Canada)	Chad Kilger	LW
30	(Canada)	Mathieu Garon^{2}	G
37	(Sweden)	Niklas Sundstrom	RW
38	(Czech Republic)	Jan Bulis	LW
43	(Canada)	Patrice Brisebois	D
44	(Canada)	Sheldon Souray	D
51	(United States)	Francis Bouillon	D
52	(Canada)	Craig Rivet	D
60	(Canada)	Jose Theodore	G
71	(Canada)	Mike Ribeiro	C
73	(Canada)	Michael Ryder	RW
79	(Russia)	Andrei Markov	D
90	(Canada)	Joe Juneau	C
94	(Canada)	Yanic Perreault	C
Head coach: (Canada) Claude Julien

Edmonton Oilers
#		Player	Position
1	(United States)	Ty Conklin	G
2	(Canada)	Eric Brewer	D
10	(Canada)	Shawn Horcoff	C
14	(Canada)	Raffi Torres	LW
15	(Canada)	Brad Isbister	LW
16	(United States)	Mike York	C
18	(Canada)	Ethan Moreau (A)	LW
20	(Czech Republic)	Radek Dvorak	RW
21	(Canada)	Jason Smith (C)	D
23	(Canada)	Cory Cross	D
24	(Canada)	Steve Staios	D
27	(Canada)	Georges Laraque	RW
28	(Canada)	Jason Chimera	C
32	(Canada)	Scott Ferguson	D
34	(Canada)	Fernando Pisani	RW
36	(Canada)	Jarret Stoll	C
40	(Canada)	Steve Valiquette^{1}	G
47	(Canada)	Marc-Andre Bergeron	D
83	(Czech Republic)	Ales Hemsky	RW
94	(Canada)	Ryan Smyth (A)	LW
Head coach: (Canada) Craig MacTavish

^1 Steve Valiquette dressed for the Edmonton Oilers as the back-up goalie and did not enter the game.
^2 Mathieu Garon dressed for the Montreal Canadiens as the back-up goalie and did not enter the game.

=== Scratches ===
- Montreal Canadiens: Donald Audette (ankle), Ron Hainsey (healthy), Marcel Hossa (healthy)
- Edmonton Oilers: Alexei Semenov (healthy), Tony Salmelainen (healthy), Peter Sarno (healthy)

=== Officials ===
- Referees — Dan Marouelli, Kevin Pollock
- Linesmen — Greg Devorski, Randy Mitton

== See also ==
- 2003–04 Edmonton Oilers season
- 2003–04 Montreal Canadiens season
- List of outdoor ice hockey games
- List of ice hockey games with highest attendance
- Pond hockey
