= 2016 NHL Heritage Classic =

Outdoor National Hockey League game

2016 Heritage Classic
	1	2	3	Total
Edmonton Oilers	2	1	0	3
Winnipeg Jets	0	0	0	0
- Date: October 23, 2016
- Venue: Investors Group Field
- City: Winnipeg
- Attendance: 33,240

The 2016 Heritage Classic (known as the 2016 Tim Hortons NHL Heritage Classic for sponsorship reasons) was a regular season outdoor National Hockey League (NHL) game that was held on October 23, 2016. The game featured the Winnipeg Jets hosting the Edmonton Oilers at Investors Group Field in Winnipeg, Manitoba, Canada, home of the CFL's Blue Bombers. The Oilers defeated the Jets, 3–0. This was the fourth NHL Heritage Classic game, and the first of four outdoor regular season games during the 2016–17 NHL season. Unusual for the NHL outdoor games, the 2016 Heritage Classic was held in mid-autumn, during the first month of the regular season, to avoid Winnipeg's harsher winter temperatures.

== Background ==
The Jets originally announced in 2013 that they had reached an agreement with the NHL to host the game, to celebrate five years since the Atlanta Thrashers moved to Winnipeg, returning the NHL to Manitoba after a fifteen-year absence. The team had originally wanted to host the game in 2015–16, its actual fifth season. However, a disagreement occurred between the NHL and the Winnipeg Blue Bombers over the game's exact date: the league wanted it held in December 2015 while the football team became concerned that this date was too close to the 103rd Grey Cup being held at the stadium on November 29. In January 2015, the Jets announced that they could not reach an agreement to finalize a date for the Heritage Classic during the 2015–16 season. On March 6, 2016, the NHL officially announced that the Jets would host the Oilers in the 2016 Heritage Classic during the 2016–17 NHL season; the Blue Bombers would be on a bye week that week and would play their second last home game before the Heritage Classic on October 8. This gave the NHL nearly two weeks to prepare the stadium for the game.

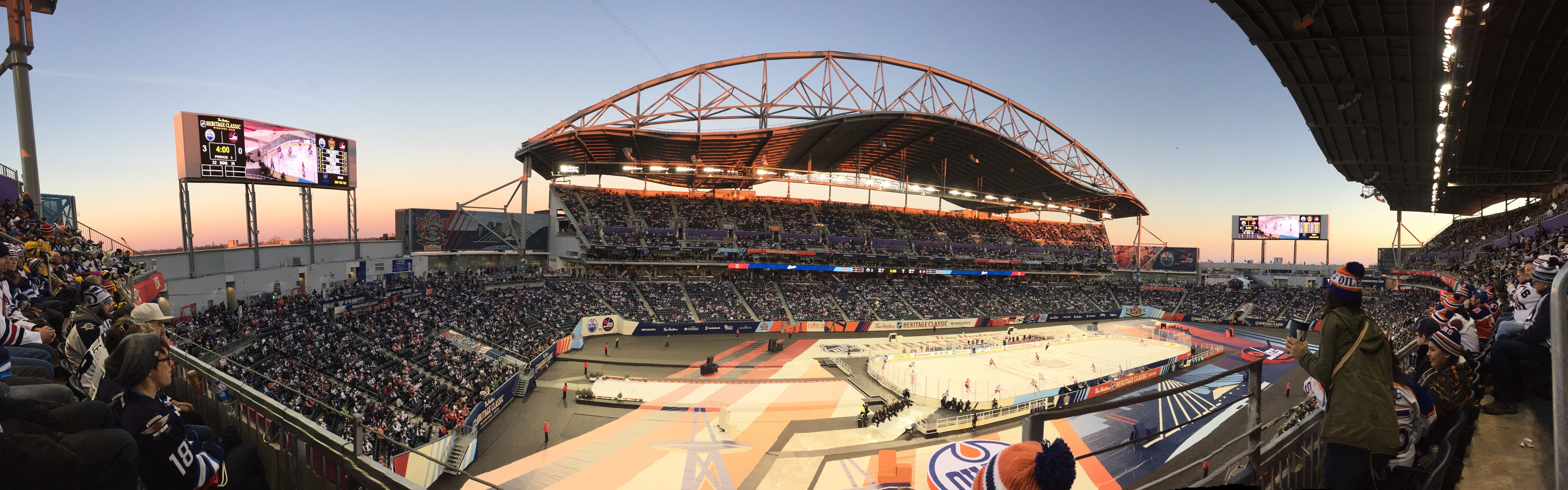
Panorama during gameplay of the 2016 Heritage Classic at Investors Group Field late in the game with the Edmonton Oilers leading the Winnipeg Jets by a score of 3-0

== Game Summary ==
October 23, 2016	Edmonton Oilers	3–0	Winnipeg Jets	Investors Group Field	Recap

Due to concern over the glare of sunlight expressed by the players, the game was delayed two hours from the original start time of 2:00 p.m. The temperature at opening face-off was 10.1 °C (50.2 °F), which was above seasonal for late October weather in Winnipeg. The Oilers basically controlled the entire game, with three different players scoring goals in the second period, while goalie Cam Talbot made 31 saves in the shutout.

Scoring summary
Period	Team	Goal	Assist(s)	Time	Score
1st	No scoring				
2nd	EDM	Mark Letestu (2) – sh	Unassisted	09:24	1–0 EDM
2nd	EDM	Darnell Nurse (1)	Connor McDavid (5) and Zack Kassian (2)	11:10	2–0 EDM
2nd	EDM	Zack Kassian (2)	Benoit Pouliot (1) and Ryan Nugent-Hopkins (2)	17:16	3–0 EDM
3rd	No scoring				

Number in parentheses represents the player's total in goals or assists to that point of the season

Penalty summary
Period	Team	Player	Penalty	Time	PIM
1st	EDM	Milan Lucic	Roughing	13:21	2:00
2nd	EDM	Darnell Nurse	Cross-checking	09:02	2:00
2nd	EDM	Andrej Sekera	Interference	18:13	2:00
3rd	WPG	Mathieu Perreault	High-sticking	09:12	2:00
3rd	WPG	Tyler Myers	Interference	10:17	2:00
3rd	EDM	Connor McDavid	Tripping	17:53	2:00

Shots by period
Team	1	2	3	Total
Edmonton	8	14	10	32
Winnipeg	10	11	10	31

Power play opportunities
Team	Goals/Opportunities
Edmonton	0/2
Winnipeg	0/4

Three star selections
	Team	Player	Statistics
1st	EDM	Cam Talbot	31 saves, 1.000 SV%
2nd	EDM	Mark Letestu	1 goal
3rd	EDM	Darnell Nurse	1 goal

== National Anthem ==
The Canadian national anthem was sung by country music duo Doc Walker and country singer Brett Kissel.

== Alumni Game ==
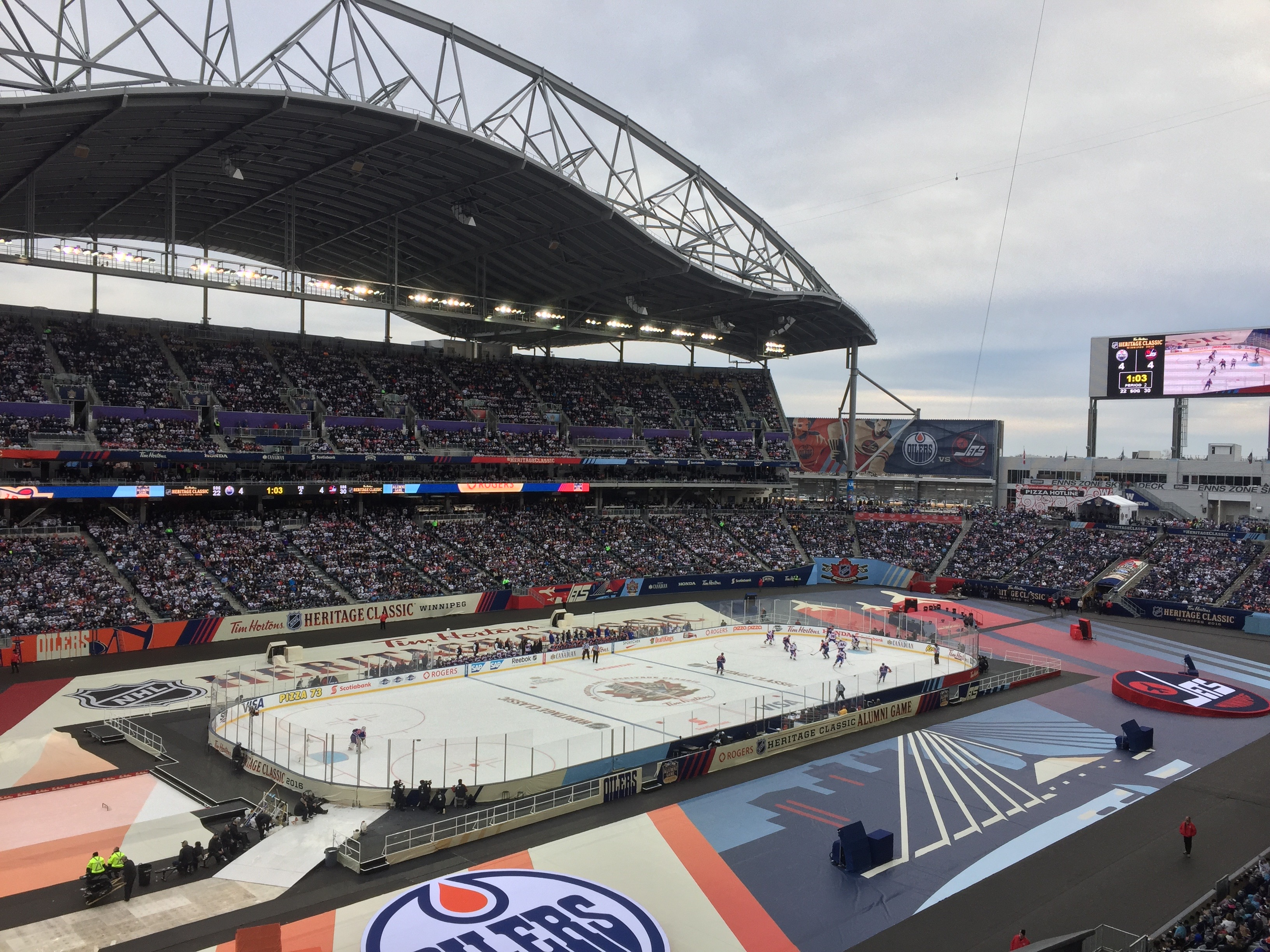
Gameplay during the 2016 Heritage Classic Alumni Game with the Edmonton Oilers Alumni taking on the host Winnipeg Jets Alumni

The Alumni Game preceding the Heritage Classic game featured players from the previous Winnipeg Jets, making it the first time that the current Jets franchise has recognized the original Jets as part of its history other than in name.

Jennifer Hanson, who sang the Canadian National Anthem before Winnipeg Jets games in the 1990s, returned to Winnipeg to sing O Canada for the first time since 1996 prior to the alumni game.

The Jets alumni team was captained by former star and captain Dale Hawerchuk and included Teemu Selanne, while the Oilers alumni team included many members of its 1980s Stanley Cup-winning teams, including captain Wayne Gretzky, Mark Messier and Jari Kurri.

Willy Lindstrom was traded from the Oilers alumni to the Jets alumni prior to the start of the third period in exchange for a first-round selection in the next alumni game. (Lindstrom had previously played for both the Winnipeg Jets and the Oilers during his playing career.) Winnipeg won the Alumni Game 6–5, the winning goal coming from Selanne on a penalty shot with 3.6 seconds left after being tripped by Oiler and Hockey Night in Canada analyst Craig Simpson.

== Television ==
The game was broadcast on Sportsnet and TVA Sports in Canada, while the NHL Network simulcast Sportsnet's feed in the U.S.
