= Alberto Riveron =

American football official (born 1960)

Al Riverón
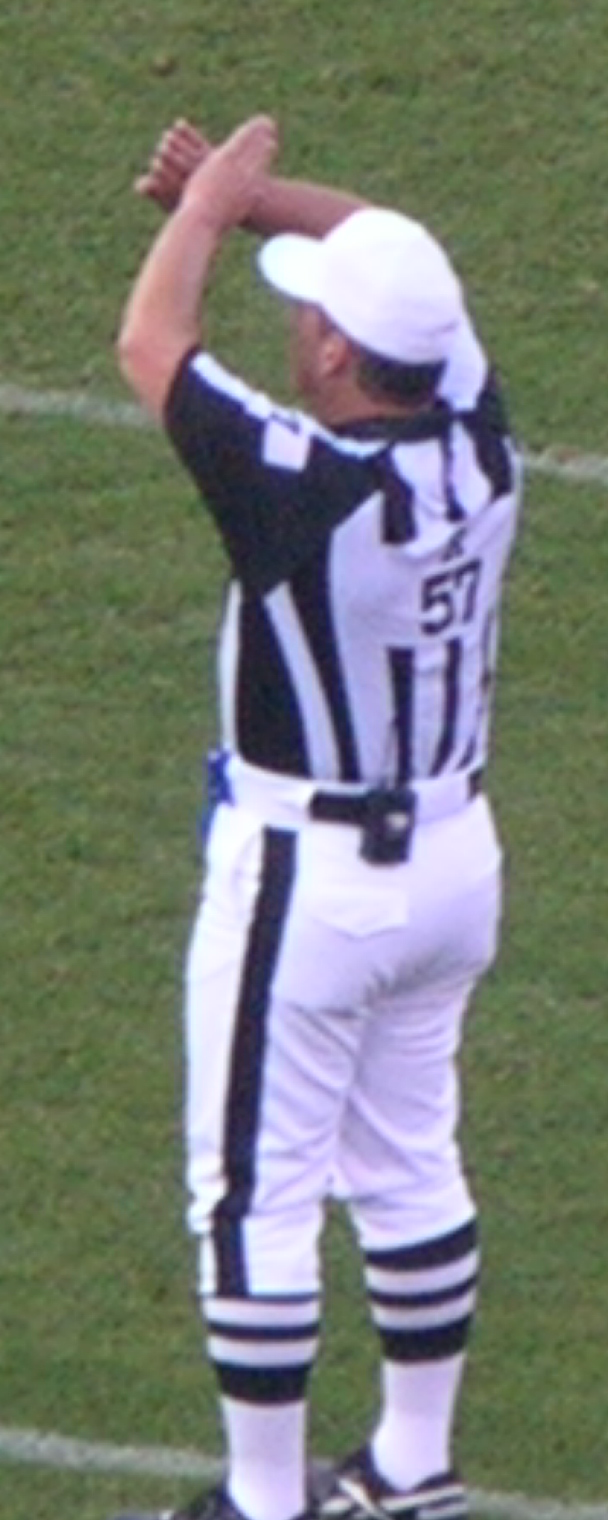
- Riveron in 2008
- Born: June 5, 1960 (age 66); Havana, Cuba
- Occupation: NFL official (2004–2012)

Alberto Riveron (born June 5, 1960) is a Cuban-American former American football official, and he was the senior vice president of officiating of the National Football League (NFL) from 2017 to 2021.

== Early life ==
Alberto Riverón was born in Cuba in 1960. His father, also named Alberto, fled to the United States in 1963. At the age of 5½ Riveron emigrated to the United States with his mother, Irene Valdés, on a Freedom Flight. Although they divorced his parents lived close to each other in northwest Miami. He grew up playing baseball, basketball and football, and he was quarterback of his high school team.

His interest in officiating began in 1977 when he was invited to attend a football officials' clinic. After six weeks of training he began officiating in Pop Warner, taking up to six games a day. He moved onto high school games and by 1990 was officiating in college games. He started in the now-defunct Southern Independent Collegiate Officials Association, which included teams such as Miami and Notre Dame. In 1993 Riveron joined the Big East Conference officiating for six years as a field judge and a side judge. In 2000 Riveron moved to Conference USA, and spent the next three years working as a referee. His supervisor was veteran official Gerald Austin, who recommended him for the now defunct NFL Europe. For two years Riveron would officiate for ten days in Europe.

== Officiating career ==
In 2004 the National Football League (NFL) hired Riveron as a side judge. Mike Pereira, the NFL's vice president for officiating, said "You can't teach the confidence and decisiveness with which he does things." He was the first Hispanic to officiate the NFL. Before every game he dedicates over 35 hours watching footage, studying the rules and meeting with his crew. He also spends hours in the gym to keep his fitness up.

He was promoted to head referee (crew chief) in April 2008 following the retirements of Austin and Larry Nemmers. He changed how his name is listed in order to connect more with his heritage. Previously listed as Al Riveron he now uses Alberto.

Riveron was the crew chief for the 2011 AFC Championship game between the Baltimore Ravens and the New England Patriots, and was the alternate referee of Super Bowl XLVI.

== Officiating executive ==
On February 19, 2013, Riveron was promoted to the league's Senior Director of Officiating, a newly created position as a second-in-command under the league's former vice president of officiating, Dean Blandino. On 10 May 2017, he was named senior vice president of officiating. Despite a shaky start the NFL announced that it would retain Riveron as its senior vice president of officiating for the 2018 season.

During the 2018 season, Riveron received criticism for the manner in which NFL officials implemented penalties for roughing the passer, which had been deemed an area of emphasis the previous off-season. Critics of the new emphasis on the rule included former NFL Vice President of Officiating Dean Blandino as well as Mike Pereira. Riveron admitted in an interview that at least two of the roughing the passer penalties applied the first week of the season had been called incorrectly. In response, the NFL competition committee held a conference call to discuss the implementation of the rule. After the conference call, the competition committee issued a rule clarification, which led to a dramatic reduction in roughing the passer penalties in the following weeks.

On September 19, 2019, New England Patriots quarterback Tom Brady tweeted that he was turning off the Thursday Night Football game because he couldn't watch the "ridiculous penalties" for offensive holding. Two days later, Riveron held a conference call with 17 NFL referees to discuss the frequency with which holding was being called. The next day, holding penalties were called an average of 2.9 times per game, down from a rate of 5.7 times per game over the previous three weeks, leading to speculation that Brady may have influenced how NFL referees officiate games.

In August 2021, it was announced that he was retiring from his position as the head of the league's officiating department.

In November 2022, Riveron was named the Supervisor of Football Officials for the ACC. In the role, he would be responsible for managing the oversight, supervision, leadership, training and development of the ACC officiating staff that includes on-field officials, instant replay officials, instant replay communicators, position coaches, evaluators and assistant supervisors. In July 2026, it was announced Riveron was stepping down as ACC Supervisor of Football Officials.

== Style ==
Riveron says that when he makes mistakes, he hears about it from everyone, but that "no one feels worse when I make mistakes than I do." He likes to keep an open line of communication between himself and the coaches and players, but tries to stop them from becoming one-sided.

== Personal life ==
Riveron has a wife, Patricia, and two sons, Tyler (1991-2016) and Austin. He had a weekday job as a sales associate for Florida Storm Panels when he first started officiating.
