= Fox Sports (United States) =

Sports programming division of the Fox Corporation

Fox Sports Media Group
- Trade name: Fox Sports
- Type: Division
- Founded: August 12, 1994; 32 years ago
- Headquarters: Fox Network Center (Fox Studio Lot Building 101), 10201 W Pico Blvd, Century City, Los Angeles, California, United States
- Key people: Brad Zager (president and Executive Producer, Fox Sports Media Group); Eric Shanks (CEO and Executive Producer, Fox Sports Media Group)
- Parent: News Corporation (1994–2013); 21st Century Fox (2013–2019); Fox Corporation (2019–present)
- Divisions: Fox Sports 1 Fox Sports 2 Fox Sports Radio; Big Ten Network (61%); Fox Sports on Tubi; Fox Sports Racing; Fox Deportes
- Website: foxsports.com

The Fox Sports Media Group is the sports programming division of Fox Corporation that is responsible for sports broadcasts carried by the Fox Broadcasting Company, as well as operating television networks Fox Sports 1 (FS1) and Fox Sports 2 (FS2) and Fox Sports Radio. In addition, the company is responsible for the streaming services Fox One and Tubi's sports programming, and it owns 61% of the Big Ten Network with the Big Ten Conference.

The division was formed on August 12, 1994, with Fox getting awarded broadcast rights to National Football League (NFL) games. In subsequent years, Fox has televised the National Hockey League (NHL) (1994–1999), Major League Baseball (MLB) (1996–present), NASCAR (2001–present), the Bowl Championship Series (BCS) (2007–2010), Major League Soccer (MLS) (2003–2011, 2015–present), the U.S. Open golf tournament (2015–2019), the National Hot Rod Association (NHRA) (2016–present), WWE programming (2019–2024), the XFL (2020–2023), the United States Football League (USFL) (2022–2023), the United Football League (UFL) (2024–present) and the World Baseball Classic (WBC) (2023–present).

On December 14, 2017, the Walt Disney Company announced plans to acquire then-parent company 21st Century Fox for $52.4 billion, which included key assets such as 20th Century Fox, the regional Fox Sports Networks (which were later sold by Disney to Sinclair Broadcast Group and Allen Media Group), FX Networks and Fox Sports International (which shut down on March 11, 2024). Under the terms of the proposed acquisition, Fox Sports 1, Fox Sports 2, and other assets were spun off into the division's current parent company, which is independently owned by Fox Corporation.

== History ==
=== Establishment ===
When the Fox Broadcasting Company launched on October 9, 1986, the network's management, having seen how sports programming (in particular, soccer events) played a critical role in the growth of the British satellite service BSkyB, determined that sports would be the type of programming that would ascend Fox to a major network status the quickest; as a result, Fox tried to attract a professional football package to the network. In 1987, after ABC initially hedged on renewing its contract with the National Football League (NFL) for the television rights to Monday Night Football, Fox made an offer for the package at the same price that ABC had been paying at the time – about $13 million per game. However, partly due to the fact that Fox had yet to establish itself as a major network, the NFL decided to resume negotiations with ABC, with the two parties eventually agreeing to a new contract, keeping what was the crown jewel of the league's television broadcasts on that network (where it remained until 2006, when MNF moved to sister network ESPN as part of a contract that also saw NBC gain the Sunday Night Football package).

Six years later, the league's television contracts for the National Football Conference (NFC) package, American Football Conference (AFC) package, as well as the Sunday night and Monday night packages were up for renewal. Fox placed an aggressive bid for $1.58 billion to obtain the broadcast rights to the NFC package, which for decades had been held by CBS. On December 17, 1993, the NFL selected Fox's bid and signed a four-year contract with Fox to award it the rights to televise regular season and playoff (as well as select preseason) games from the NFC, beginning with the 1994 season; the initial contract also included the exclusive U.S. television rights to broadcast Super Bowl XXXI in 1997. The deal stripped CBS of football telecasts for the first time since 1955.

Fox Sports logo, used from 2000 to 2012; still used in Australia.

Fox lured commentators Pat Summerall, John Madden, Dick Stockton, Matt Millen, James Brown and Terry Bradshaw, as well as many behind-the-scenes management and production personnel from CBS Sports to staff the network's NFL coverage. The network's studio coverage originated from the Fox Television Center in Hollywood, California, later moving to the Fox Network Center (located on the 20th Century Fox backlot in Century City) by 1998.

In order to bolster viewership for the NFL telecasts, News Corporation, parent company of Fox at the time, decided to strike affiliation deals with broadcasting companies that owned stations affiliated with ABC, NBC and CBS in order to raise the profile of Fox's affiliate body, which at the time mainly consisted of UHF stations that (with some exceptions) had little to no prior history as a major network affiliate, had weaker signals and largely did not carry as much value with advertisers as the Big Three's affiliates. During the late spring and summer of 1994, Fox reached separate agreements with New World Communications (a media company controlled by investor Ronald Perelman, which Fox's station group Fox Television Stations would purchase in July 1996) and SF Broadcasting (a joint venture between Fox and Savoy Pictures that purchased four stations from Burnham Broadcasting through separate deals in July and August 1994) to switch a total of sixteen stations to Fox between September 1994 and September 1996 as affiliation contracts with those stations' existing network partners expired. The NFL television rights and affiliation deals firmly established Fox as the nation's fourth major network. The network's relationship with the NFL would expand in 1997, when it began airing games and acquired partial ownership of NFL Europe (although the partial ownership ended in 2000), an agreement which ended in 2006 when all games were moved to NFL Network; the by-then renamed NFL Europa closed down the next year.

With a sports division now established, Fox decided to seek broadcast rights agreements with other major sports leagues. On September 9, 1994, Fox was awarded the broadcast television rights to the National Hockey League (NHL) in a $155 million bid (amounting to $31 million annually); as a result, it became the first broadcast network to be awarded a national television contract to carry NHL games, which longtime NHL Commissioner John Ziegler had long thought to be unattainable (NHL games had not aired regularly on a national broadcast network – outside of select championship and All-Star games, and time buy basis airings of ESPN telecasts on ABC from 1992 to 1994 – since NBC's telecast of the 1975 Stanley Cup Finals, as networks were not willing to commit to broadcasting a large number of games due to low viewership). Again, Fox outbid CBS, which wanted to secure the rights as a result of losing the NFL to Fox, for the NHL package. Fox lost the NHL rights to ABC Sports and ESPN in 1999.

=== MLB, NASCAR and BCS acquisitions ===
On November 7, 1995, Fox was awarded partial broadcast rights to Major League Baseball (MLB) games, in a shared deal with NBC (which had carried the league's telecasts since 1947). Through the deal, which Fox paid a fraction of the amount ($115 million) that CBS paid to obtain the rights effective with the 1990 season, Fox would broadcast approximately 16 regular season Saturday afternoon games per season (unlike the previous Baseball Network deal between NBC and ABC) and offered different game broadcasts shown on a regionalized basis (usually up to three per week). As part of a six-year renewal of this deal – valued at $2.5 billion – in September 2000, Fox Sports became the exclusive over-the-air broadcaster of Major League Baseball, giving it the exclusive rights to the World Series beginning with the 2000 edition, as well as rights to the All-Star Game, select Division Series games and exclusive coverage of the League Championship Series. Under a clause in the contract (which has not been exercised as there has not been a labor dispute during the term of rights while Fox Sports has held the contract), if some of the scheduled games were cancelled by a strike or lockout, Fox would still pay Major League Baseball for a full slate of annual games, while the league in turn had to compensate Fox with additional telecasts.

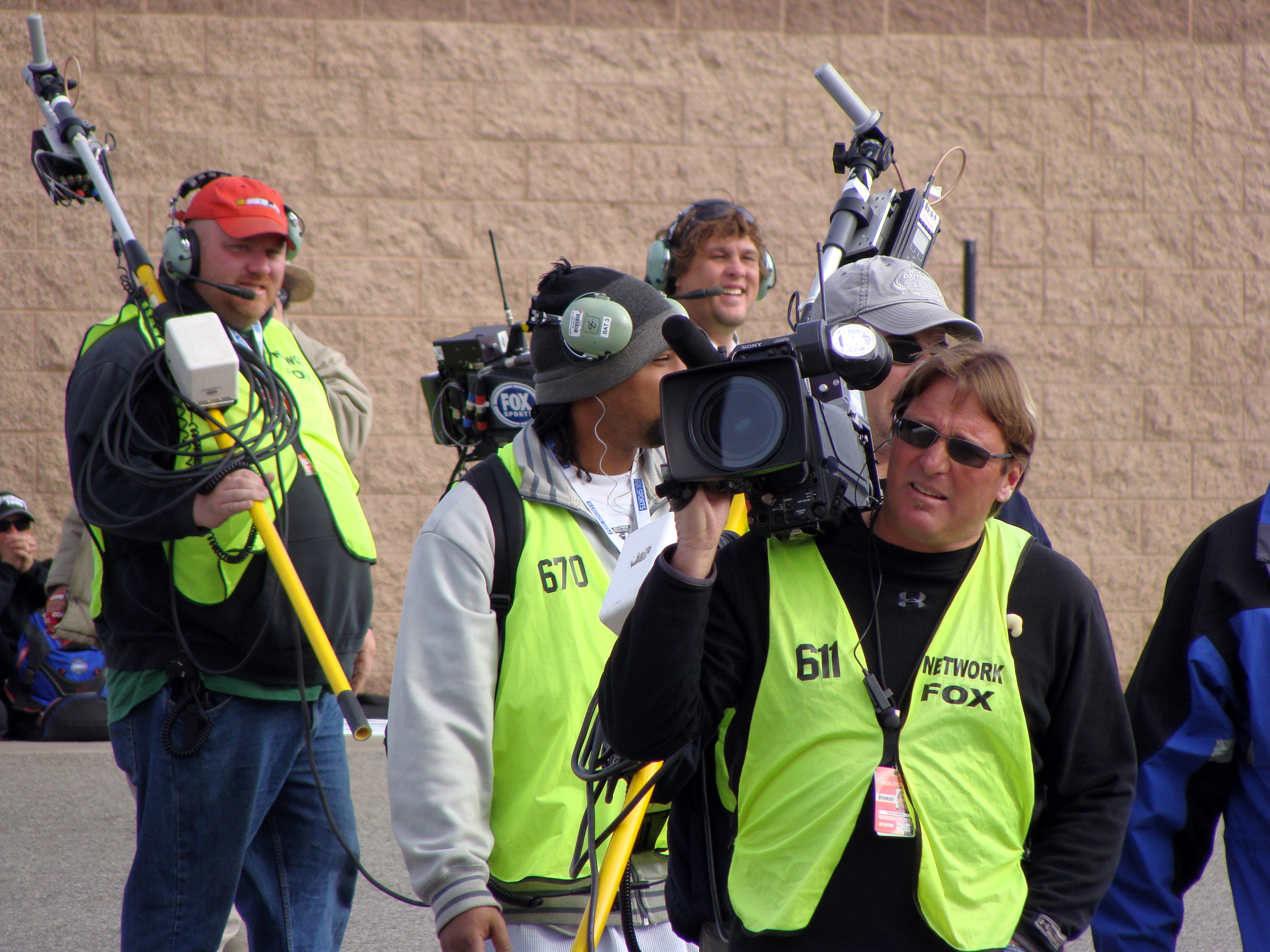
Fox Sports crew covering a NASCAR race

In 1998, Fox obtained the broadcast rights to the Cotton Bowl Classic college football game. In 2007, Fox began airing most of the games of the Bowl Championship Series, including the BCS National Championship Game, in a deal worth close to $20 million per game. Due to a separate arrangement between ABC and the Pasadena Tournament of Roses Association, events in the series that were held at the Rose Bowl stadium – such as the Rose Bowl Game and the 2010 BCS Championship – were excluded from the contract.

On November 11, 1999, Fox and sister cable channel FX were awarded rights to the NASCAR Winston Cup Series and Busch Series as part of NASCAR's first centralized television rights deal, beginning in the 2001 season. The contract covered the first half of the season, with the second half of the season being aired by NBC and TNT. Rights to the Daytona 500 and Pepsi 400 alternated annually, with Fox airing the 500 in odd-numbered years, and the 400 in even-numbered years. Fox's first telecast was the 2001 Daytona 500—an event that would be marred by a final-lap crash that resulted in the death of Dale Earnhardt. Later that year, Fox acquired the motorsports cable network Speedvision, and rebranded it in February 2002 as Speed Channel. Fox intended to use the network as an outlet for ancillary NASCAR content. In September 2002, Speed Channel bought out ESPN's contract to televise the NASCAR Craftsman Truck Series.

Fox lost the broadcasting rights to the Bowl Championship Series to ESPN beginning in 2010. In response, Fox introduced a Saturday "game of the week" on FX in 2011, featuring games from the Pac-12, the Big 12 and Conference USA (the rights to which were later assumed by Fox and Fox Sports 1); Fox also signed deals to carry two new championship games created through conference realignments that occurred in 2010 and 2011: the Big Ten Conference Championship through 2016 (as part of Fox Sports' involvement with the Big Ten Network), and the Pac-12 Championship through 2017 on an alternating basis with ESPN. With the replacement of the BCS with the College Football Playoff, Fox lost the broadcasting rights to the 2015 Cotton Bowl Classic onwards again to ESPN.

=== Present day ===
In May 2010, Fox aired the final of the UEFA Champions League, marking the network's first ever soccer broadcast.

In August 2011, Fox Sports announced it had reached a seven-year broadcast agreement with the Ultimate Fighting Championship (UFC), ending the mixed martial arts promotion's relationship with Spike. The deal included the rights to broadcast four live events in prime time or late night annually, as well as other UFC programming that would air on various Fox properties, including the Fox network (which aired its first UFC match in November 2011, the first time that the UFC aired an event on broadcast television), FX and Fuel TV. The contract expired in 2019, with the UFC moving its broadcast rights to ESPN.

On October 22, 2011, FIFA announced that Fox Sports had acquired rights to air its tournaments beginning in 2015, including the 2015 and 2019 FIFA Women's World Cup, and the 2018 and 2022 FIFA World Cup. In February 2015, Fox's contract was extended to 2026 (which was ultimately awarded to a joint North American bid led by the United States), in what was reported to be compensation for the rescheduling of the 2022 tournament to late-November/mid-December (which will compete with the regular seasons of the NFL).

On August 6, 2013, Fox Sports announced a 12-year deal to broadcast the championships of the United States Golf Association (USGA), including the U.S. Open, beginning in 2015. In 2016, Fox began to air NHRA drag racing events—primarily on Fox Sports 1 and 2, and with selected flagship events airing on Fox proper. On May 12, 2014, Fox Sports announced a 7-year deal to broadcast Major League Soccer (MLS). The deal included the rights to air the MLS Cup on Fox in even numbered years.

On July 24, 2017, the Big Ten Conference announced that it had reached six-year deals with Fox Sports and ESPN to hold rights to its football games beginning in the 2017 season, with Fox's package expanding on its involvement in BTN. As part of the contract, Fox's contract to run BTN was extended through 2032.

On January 31, 2018, the NFL announced that Fox had acquired the sub-license for its Thursday Night Football package under a five-year deal, beginning in the 2018 NFL season. The deal is reportedly worth an average of more than $660 million per year. On May 6, 2019, Fox Sports announced a multi-year broadcast deal with the new incarnation XFL, which went on hiatus midway through its first season, but would return in 2023.

In May 2019, Fox Sports partnered with The Stars Group to launch co-branded sports betting operations, including Fox Bet (which offers real-money sports betting where legal), as well as the free football prediction game Fox Sports Super 6. As part of the partnership, Fox Corporation acquired a 4.99% minority stake in the company for $236 million, with an option to increase its stake to up to 50% within the next 10 years. The partnership made Fox the first major U.S. sports broadcaster to establish a sports betting operation, taking advantage of the repeal of the Professional and Amateur Sports Protection Act of 1992. With the company's sale to Flutter Entertainment, Fox would have an option in 2021 to acquire an 18.5% stake in its U.S. subsidiary FanDuel Group.

In June 2020, Fox exited its contract with the USGA and sold the remainder to previous rightsholder NBC. In June 2021, it was announced that Fox would be a minority investor in a new iteration of the United States Football League (USFL), which would operate as a successor to The Spring League.

In November 2021, it was announced that Fox Sports had acquired English-language rights to UEFA national team matches under a six-year deal from 2022 to 2028, replacing ESPN. This includes the UEFA Nations League beginning in June 2022, tournaments such as UEFA Euro 2024 and 2028, UEFA qualifiers for Euro and the FIFA World Cup, and UEFA-organized friendlies. In January 2022, Fox announced that it would sub-license portions of this package to FuboTV, focusing on the Nations League and selected matches from the European Championships. In January 2022, Fox Sports reached an agreement with the New York Racing Association for the rights to the Belmont Stakes, the third leg of the horse racing triple crown, through 2030.

On February 6, 2024, Fox Sports announced a joint venture with ESPN Inc. and TNT Sports, named Venu Sports, that would include the three organizations' main linear sports channels and associated media rights, beginning in fall 2024. The service was ultimately cancelled.

On June 13, 2024, Fox Sports announced a multi-year deal to be the sole broadcaster of the IndyCar Series and its subsidiary series Indy NXT. On January 16, 2025, Fox Sports announced a multi-year deal with the Saudi PIF-backed LIV Golf, replacing The CW's sports division as its broadcaster.

On July 17, 2025, Fox Sports announced a content partnership with Barstool Sports and its founder Dave Portnoy, under which Barstool will produce a new daily studio program for FS1, Portnoy and other Barstool personalities will make appearances on Fox's college football pre-game show Big Noon Kickoff, and the two units will also co-develop new digital content.

== Channels ==
In addition to the broadcast division, Fox Sports Media Group owns other national cable sports channels and a radio network in the United States, which include:

- Fox Sports 1 – a national general sports network, which presents a wide variety of sports programming.
- Fox Sports 2 – a national general sports network, which serves as a counterpart to FS1.
- Fox Sports on Tubi – a national general sports network available exclusively on Fox's free ad-supported streaming television Tubi.
- Big Ten Network – a joint venture with the Big Ten Conference, airing various sporting events involving and programs pertaining to its member schools.
- Fox Soccer Plus – a sports network (originating as a spin-off of the now-defunct Fox Soccer) which broadcasts domestic and international soccer matches.
- Fox Sports Racing – a motorsports-oriented sports network operating in North American markets outside of the U.S. as a replacement for Speed, which primarily carries motorsports events from FS1 and FS2.
- Fox Deportes – a Spanish-language network, which airs Spanish-language coverage of Fox Sports properties.
- Fox Sports Radio – a national sports talk radio network managed by Premiere Networks in partnership with Fox Sports.

=== 2013 cable reorganization ===
Fox Sports Media Group formally announced the replacement of Speed with Fox Sports 1 on March 5, 2013, with the network eventually launching on the tentative date of August 17, 2013. The network would air content from Major League Baseball, the UFC, NASCAR, soccer (including the FIFA World Cup) and multiple college sports events (including owning rights to Big East basketball and its annual postseason basketball tournament at Madison Square Garden). The network launched Fox Sports Live as a competitor to ESPN's SportsCenter, with the former described as a "24/7 news franchise providing around-the-clock coverage through regularly scheduled programs, hourly updates and an information-rich ticker that provides a network agnostic sports event television schedule." Notable personalities on FS1 include Regis Philbin, Mike Tyson, Michael Strahan, Erin Andrews, as well as many others. The international feed of Speed would eventually be replaced with Fox Sports Racing on February 20, 2015.

On August 17, 2013, the extreme sports-focused Fuel TV was rebranded as Fox Sports 2, a companion network serving primarily as an overflow channel for Fox Sports 1, along with providing supplementary sports coverage.

On September 2, 2013, Fox Soccer was replaced by FXX, an entertainment-based sister network to FX with a focus on comedy programming. With the concurrent shutdown and replacement of the network, Fox Soccer's sports programming was shifted over to Fox Sports 1 and Fox Sports 2. As a result, outside of very rare sports conflicts on both Fox Sports networks, FX no longer carries any sports programming. Fox Soccer's companion premium service, Fox Soccer Plus, continues to exist and supplements soccer coverage on Fox Sports 1 and Fox Sports 2.

=== Former affiliates ===
- Fox College Sports – a slate of three cable channels (Atlantic, Central and Pacific) produced by regional Fox Sports Networks, which airs additional college sports content from across the country.

==== Regional sports networks ====
Prior to its acquisition by the Sinclair Broadcast Group, Fox Sports Networks operated as a slate of regional sports networks with broadcasting agreements that follow league market distribution rules. For example, cable and satellite subscribers in Kansas City, Missouri receive Kansas City Royals games on Fox Sports Midwest, while viewers in Milwaukee, Wisconsin see Milwaukee Brewers games on Fox Sports Wisconsin. The regionalized coverage frequently restricts broadcasts of live sporting events outside of a team's home market.

In addition to game coverage, the regional networks also air regionally-based news, analysis, magazine, and documentary programming, as well as some common national programming.

In some markets, the regional Fox Sports network operates one or multiple overflow feeds that carry additional programs that cannot be carried on the main feed due to event conflicts.

On March 31, 2021, the Fox Sports Networks rebranded as Bally Sports.

- Fox Sports Arizona
- Fox Sports Detroit
  - Fox Sports Detroit Plus
- Fox Sports Florida
- Fox Sports Sun
- Fox Sports Indiana
- Fox Sports Kansas City
- Fox Sports Midwest
- Fox Sports New Orleans
- Fox Sports North
- Fox Sports Ohio
- SportsTime Ohio
- Fox Sports Oklahoma
- Fox Sports San Diego
- Fox Sports South
- Fox Sports Tennessee
- Fox Sports Carolinas
- Fox Sports Southeast
- Fox Sports Southwest
- Fox Sports West and Prime Ticket
- Fox Sports Wisconsin
- Fox Sports Northwest
- Fox Sports Pittsburgh
- Fox Sports Rocky Mountain
- Fox Sports Utah
- Fox Sports New York
- YES Network

==== International ====
- Fox Sports International – operated as an international sports programming and production entity that distributed sports programming to various countries in Europe, Asia and Latin America.

== Technical evolution ==
=== High-definition coverage ===
For Super Bowl XXXVI in 2002, Fox Sports produced its first telecast in a 16:9, 480p enhanced-definition format marketed as "Fox Widescreen"; while promoted as having better quality than standard definition, and being the first U.S. sporting event produced completely in a widescreen format, it was not true high definition, but still matched the aspect ratio of HDTV sets.

Fox Sports began producing selected events in 720p high definition, starting on July 3, 2004, with the Pepsi 400, select NFL games, the 2004 Major League Baseball All-Star Game, and that year's postseason.

During the following years, Fox would produce more sports telecasts in HD, but still fell back on using 480p widescreen for events not televised in HD.

As of late July 2010, all sports programming broadcast by Fox-owned networks began transitioning to a format optimized for 16:9 widescreen displays, with graphics framed within a widescreen safe area rather than the 4:3 safe area, intended to be shown in a letterboxed format on standard definition feeds.

=== Virtual reality ===
From 2016 until selling its virtual reality division FoxNext to Disney in 2019, Fox Sports produced a limited number of game telecasts in 360-degree virtual reality, mostly college football. A TV Everywhere login was required to access the broadcast.

=== 4K coverage ===
In 2017, Fox Sports began to produce selected telecasts in 4K ultra-high-definition television, beginning with selected NASCAR and college basketball events, and for the 2017 season, a college football game per-week. They are primarily available via DirecTV and other supported providers.

Fox began televising its Thursday Night Football games in 1080p upconverted to 4K with HLG HDR on September 26, 2019.

=== Technological enhancements ===
- FoxBox (sports)
- FoxTrax
- MLB on Fox – Innovations

== Graphics, scoring bugs and theme music ==
The graphics and scoring bugs used by Fox Sports have won awards and changed how sports broadcasts are presented on United States television. The opening notes of the theme used on the Fox network's NFL broadcasts are incorporated in iterations of other themes used on Fox Sports broadcasts. Originally, when the scoring bugs are upgraded, the previous versions were retained for one of the division's other properties for about a year; however, this practice ended in 2009. The first score bug was used for Fox's NFL coverage, and was then expanded to the network's baseball and hockey broadcasts.

One segment of the Scott Schreer-composed theme, coincidentally or otherwise, echoes the notes for the "giddyup, giddyup, giddyup, let's go" line from the Leroy Anderson-composed song, Sleigh Ride. Although, the rhythm of that segment of both tunes is similar to that of the first four bars of both the first and second figures of the Johann Strauss Sr.-composed Radetzky March, which itself is similar to that of the finale of Gioachino Rossini's overture to his opera William Tell. During sports broadcasts aired during the Christmas holiday season, Fox Sports broadcasts will sometimes acknowledge this fact by seguéing from the one tune into the other during the commercial break outcue.

Beginning in October 2010, the NFL on FOX theme became uniform for all Fox Sports properties beginning with the National League Championship Series that year and NASCAR races with the 2011 Budweiser Shootout. However, NASCAR and MLB broadcasts reinstated their own theme music in 2016 and 2020, respectively, and the CBB on FOX telecasts were switched over to "Roundball Rock", which was formerly used by the NBA on NBC, in 2019. Fox College Football uses a marching band rendition of the NFL theme, and USFL on FOX, which debuted in 2022, uses the standard version.

=== 2001–2003 ===
By 2001, the score bug was restructured as a horizontal header positioned at the top of the screen, and was simpler than later versions. It was first utilized that year on Fox's NASCAR coverage with the introduction of a new updated graphics package that was based on the 1998 design; the bug and updated graphics were then utilized on the network's Major League Baseball and NFL telecasts. It featured a translucent black rectangle, a baseball diamond graphic for baseball broadcasts on the far left, the team abbreviations in white with their scores in yellow boxes (the boxes were white for NFL broadcasts until Super Bowl XXXVI, when the coloring was changed to yellow), then the quarter or inning, time or number of outs, pitch count/speed (used for baseball broadcasts), and the logo of the Fox Sports event property whose game is being telecast (such as NFL on Fox or MLB on Fox) on the far right.

=== 2003–2006 ===
Beginning with the 2003 NFL season, the score bug was upgraded as part of a new graphics package. At first, the team abbreviations were replaced with team logos, and the scores were rendered in white within black parallelograms. Unlike the previous version, the FoxBox would alternate between a black rectangle and several black parallelograms; however, it reverted to being a black rectangle beginning with the 2004 NFL season, and the team logos would later be replaced with abbreviations in the respective teams' primary colors (the colorized team abbreviations would first be utilized on postseason baseball broadcasts that year). Whenever a team scores a point or a run, the team's score and logo would flash a few times.

During baseball broadcasts, the entire bug would flash with the words "HOME RUN" and the team's name in the team's color zooming in to the center from both left and right. In late 2005, a new white bug resembling a chrome finish was introduced, and the team abbreviations became rendered in white letters in the team's main color; the new bug debuted on Fox's coverage of the 2005 World Series, and would then be expanded to NFL and NASCAR broadcasts. Baseball broadcasts continued to use the 2001 score bugs and graphics in 2004 until the network's coverage of that year's postseason.

During NASCAR telecasts from 2007 to 2011, this graphics package was briefly used to weather delay updates and also used for merchandise for the Digger cam. This graphics package was also used during Prelude to the Dream at Eldora from 2005 to 2007.

=== 2006–2010 ===
Beginning with the 2006 NFL season, the score bug was upgraded again. This time, real-time scores from around the league were included as a permanent fixture on the extreme right side of the bar, while the bug's coloring changed to the colors of the team currently in possession of the ball (this coloring scheme was seen only on football broadcasts). The bug no longer flashed after the scoring of runs, touchdowns or field goals. During baseball broadcasts, the diamond graphic appeared in middle-justification and was slimmed down to just the three main bases, unlike other implements which included home plate. This bug, after first being used for NFL broadcasts in 2006, was eventually expanded to Bowl Championship Series, NASCAR and MLB; baseball telecasts, however, continued to use the late-2005 score bugs and graphics in 2007. In 2008, Fox NASCAR introduced a new camera embedded between turns one and two on the various tracks; it was soon known as "Digger Cam", unveiled alongside a gopher mascot named Digger.

In 2009, this graphics package was dropped entirely for Fox's baseball telecasts and replaced with the then-current Fox Sports Net graphics, which had debuted on baseball telecasts across FSN's affiliates that season. The score bug reverted to a rectangular box positioned in the top-left corner of the 4:3 safe area. These were later repositioned for widescreen in July 2010, when Fox Sports began presenting all of its high definition programming content in the 16:9 aspect ratio, with letterboxing on standard definition feeds relayed to pay television providers.

=== 2010–2014 ===
At the beginning of the 2010 NFL pre-season, Fox debuted a new graphics package for its football coverage – an upgraded version of the 2006 design with a "much more colorful 3D look." The new graphics also marked a migration to Vizrt hardware for CG, providing producers with a more streamlined workflow for graphics. The new design would be rolled out for Fox's racing coverage and the Speed network in 2011, at the start of the 2011 MLB season (where both Fox and the FSN networks would begin using it as well, excluding SportSouth games simulcast by WPCH-TV and Root Sports – which used the previous FSN appearance), and on Fox Soccer.

=== 2014–2017 ===
A new graphics package for Fox Sports broadcasts was introduced for Fox's NASCAR coverage leading up to the 2014 Daytona 500. Fox Sports Midwest producer Max Leinwand described the look as being "cleaner" than the previous design. The design has also been used to introduce new design conventions for some of Fox's graphics; for NASCAR, the running order ticker was replaced by a leaderboard-style display that was initially displayed as a vertical sidebar. MLB uses a score bug at the bottom-right (initially at the bottom-left) of the screen instead of the top-left, while NFL utilized a top-left score bug with a vertical layout.

=== 2017–2020 ===
A new graphics package was launched on August 27, 2017, for Fox's first NFL preseason broadcast, featuring a dark flat design scheme, and shifting football to a horizontal score banner along the bottom of the screen (in line with all other NFL broadcasters). Upon its debut, the new football score bug was widely panned by viewers for its basic appearance and small text size. This package was also adopted by Big Ten Network (which had previously used its own separate graphics packages), and was deployed for MLB coverage on Fox and FS1 starting with the 2017 MLB postseason. Fox continues to use Vizrt software, and began to increasingly utilize laptops to run its on-air graphics as opposed to full systems (maintained as backups). The introduction of the package to NASCAR for the 2018 season saw Fox once again adopt a vertical leaderboard for the running order, initially within an opaque sidebar before switching to a translucent design for the Daytona 500.

=== 2020–present ===
In a move to give its individual properties distinct brands, Fox began to phase the 2017 graphics out in 2020, in favor of bespoke graphics packages for each of its major properties (the prior flat graphics continue to be used for sports properties that do not have dedicated graphics). The first of these packages for football debuted at Super Bowl LIV in February 2020, which featured a theme based on parallelograms, a centered, pod-like scoreboard, and stylized illustrations of key players. It was adopted full-time by subsequent football telecasts, including the subsequent XFL and 2020 NFL and college football seasons.

New graphics were adopted by further properties beginning in 2021, including Major League Baseball (beginning with the 2021 postseason), college basketball (beginning with the 2021–22 season), and NASCAR (beginning with the 2022 season, similarly incorporating stylized illustrations similarly to the NFL graphics). In 2023, Fox adopted a "modernized" update to the NFL graphics at Super Bowl LVII, college football diverged with a new theme, and NHRA coverage debuted new graphics during the U.S. Nationals (via the NHRA's partnership with SMT). A new graphics package for collegiate Olympic sports by Drive Studios also debuted in 2024; it was developed primarily for Big Ten Network, and replaces the 2017 graphics on BTN properties outside of basketball and football (which use the same graphics as Fox broadcasts).

== Public service ==
In February 2008, Fox Sports announced a new charitable foundation called Fox Sports Supports, which provides grants and marketing support for health-related causes. Each organization is tied to a specific events package seen on Fox Sports.

The following are the charities supported during the history of the program:

=== 2008–2009 cycle (began with 2008 Daytona 500) ===
- NASCAR on Fox: Autism Speaks
- MLB on Fox: Make-A-Wish Foundation
- NFL on Fox: Children's Health Fund
- Fox College Football: Alzheimer's Association

=== 2009–2010 cycle (began with 2009 Daytona 500) ===
- NASCAR on Fox: Susan G. Komen for the Cure
- MLB on Fox: The Michael J. Fox Foundation
- NFL on Fox: City of Hope National Medical Center
- Fox College Football: Malaria No More

== Gambling ==
In May 2019, amid the state-by-state legalization of sports betting in the United States following the repeal of the Professional and Amateur Sports Protection Act of 1992, Fox Corporation entered into a joint venture with The Stars Group to develop gaming products under the brand Fox Bet. They included free-to-play games such as Fox Bet Super 6, and a real-money mobile sportsbook operating in several states where they are legal. The services and games were co-promoted on Fox Sports properties, including the Fox Sports 1 studio program Fox Bet Live (formerly Lock it In). As part of the agreement, Fox Corporation acquired a 4.99% stake in The Stars Group, which was later acquired by Flutter Entertainment. Fox holds a 2.6% minority stake in Flutter, and was given an option to acquire up to 18.5% of its U.S. division FanDuel in 2021.

On July 30, 2023, it was announced that Fox Corporation and Flutter would close down their Fox Bet platform in a phased closure, starting the next day and ending on August 31. As part of the deal, Fox Corporation retained future use of the Fox Bet brand and relaunched Fox Bet Super 6 later in the year under the name Fox Super 6; this version was exclusive to the Fox Sports website and mobile app. Although not exactly confirmed, it was likely that Fox Corporation didn't exercise a right to acquire up to 50% of The Stars Group on the condition it was licensed, allowing themselves and Flutter to shut down Fox Bet in August 2023.

== Programming issues ==
Although the amount of sports content on the network has gradually expanded since Fox Sports was founded in 1994 (particularly since 2013), Fox's sports schedule on weekend afternoons has remained very inconsistent to this day as the majority of its sports contracts are with professional leagues and collegiate conferences associated with more widely known sporting events, with very limited supplementary coverage of amateur, extreme or winter sports (unlike NBC or CBS) that can be aired during the daytime even when major events are not broadcast – leaving absences in daytime sports coverage on either a Saturday, a Sunday or both on certain weeks. Syndicated programming (either in the form of feature films, series or both) and/or infomercials scheduled by the network's owned-and-operated stations and affiliates, as well as occasional Fox Sports-produced specials and Fox-supplied preview specials for upcoming primetime shows fill Fox stations' weekend afternoon schedules on days with limited to no sports programming.

Some of the network's sports telecasts (most frequently, college football and Sunday afternoon NFL games, and the World Series) delay or outright pre-empt regularly scheduled local evening newscasts on Fox stations due to typical overruns past a set time block or pre-determined later start times; a few Fox affiliates that maintain news departments (such as WBRC in Birmingham, Alabama and WVUE-DT in New Orleans) have opted not to air or have cancelled early evening newscasts on Saturdays and Sundays due to frequent sports preemptions in that daypart, while others (such as WDAF-TV in Kansas City, Missouri) instead reschedule their weekend early evening news programs to an earlier timeslot if possible when Fox is scheduled to air an evening game or race.

Conversely, some Fox Sports programming (though never major sports, NASCAR, or college football) is delayed for later airing for several reasons. WSVN in Miami traditionally delays Fox Sports' Sunday lower-tier racing programming to late night in order to maintain their revenue on Sunday afternoons for paid programming, while several stations often disregarded the pregame shows for the 2018 FIFA World Cup to reduce schedule disruption. In November 2018, WITI in Milwaukee opted to move the final of that year's Las Vegas Invitational college basketball tournament on that year's Black Friday to their secondary Antenna TV subchannel in order to avert disruption to their news schedule before a primetime airing of that year's Apple Cup football game. Fox's NFL Kickoff, preceding Fox NFL Sunday, is often aired on a secondary subchannel in several markets due to both official team programming and E/I programming burdens needing to be satisfied by Fox affiliates.

As is done with CBS, Fox offers a flex schedule for its NFL and Major League Baseball telecasts, featuring a selection of up to four games that vary on a regional basis, allowing either one or (often) two consecutive telecasts to air on a given day depending on the Fox station's designated market.

== Programs throughout the years ==
=== Current broadcast rights ===
NFL on Fox (1994–present)

- Pre-game shows: Fox NFL Sunday (1994–present) and Fox NFL Kickoff (Fox, 2015–present; FS1, 2013–2015)
- NFL Thanksgiving Day game (1994–present)
- Post-game show: The OT (2006–present)
- Super Bowl: XXXI, XXXIII, XXXVI, XXXIX, XLII, XLV, XLVIII, LI, LIV, LVII, LIX, LXIII, and LXVII

MLB on Fox (1996–present)

- World Series: 1996, 1998, 2000–present (exclusive through 2028)
- All-Star Game: 1997, 1999, 2001–present
- World Baseball Classic: 2023–present, triennial

Fox College Football (1998–present)

- Big Noon Kickoff (2019–present)
- Big Noon Saturday (2019–present)
- Big 12 (2012–present)
- Big Ten (2017–present)
- Mountain West (2020–present)
- Big Ten Football Championship Game (2011–2023 and 2025–2027 and 2029 (shared with CBS)
- Mountain West Conference Football Championship Game (2020–present)
- Holiday Bowl (2017–2019, 2022–present)

Fox College Hoops (2013–present)

- Big East men's and women's basketball (2013–present)
- Big 12 men's and women's basketball (2023–present)
- Big Ten men's and women's basketball (2017–present)
- Mountain West men's and women's basketball (2020–present)
- Big East men's basketball tournament (2014–present)

Motorsport
NASCAR on Fox (2001–present)

- Daytona 500: Odd numbered years from 2001 to 2005, every year since 2007 (exclusive through 2031)

IndyCar Series on Fox (2025–present)

- Indianapolis 500 (2025–present)

Other motorsport events

- NHRA Camping World Drag Racing Series (2016–present)
- ARCA Menards Series (2001–present)
- American Flat Track (2022–present)

Fox Soccer

- FIFA World Cup (quadrennial since 2018)
- Canadian Premier League (2020–present)
- Major League Soccer (2003–2011, 2015–present)
- Leagues Cup (2023–present)
- Liga MX (2018–present) – Tigres home games only
- CONCACAF Gold Cup (1998, 2002, 2007, 2009, 2011, 2013, 2015, 2017, 2019, 2021, 2023, 2025)
- CONCACAF Champions League (2012–present)
- UEFA (shared with FuboTV)
  - UEFA Nations League (2022–2028)
  - UEFA European Championship (2024, 2028)
  - CONMEBOL–UEFA Cup of Champions (2022–present)
  - UEFA Women's Championship (2025)
- Copa América & Copa América Femenina (2021–present)
- Coupe de France (2023–present)
- Saudi Pro League (2023–present)

Horse racing

- Thoroughbred Racing on Fox Sports (1997–1999, 2014–present)
  - America's Day at the Races (2019–present)
  - Travers Stakes (2019–present)
  - Saudi Cup (2020–present)
  - Jim Dandy Stakes (2022–present)
  - Belmont Stakes (2023–present)
  - Fourstardave Handicap (2023–present)

Other

- Australian Football League (2012–present)
- Super League (2012–present)
- National Rugby League (2014–present)
- National Lacrosse League (2016–present)
- Westminster Kennel Club Dog Show (2017–present)
- Bassmaster Elite Series/Bassmaster Classic (2021–present)
- Professional Pickleball Association (2021–present)
- United Football League (2024–present)
- The Basketball Tournament (2024–present)
- The American Rodeo (2024–present)

=== Former broadcast rights ===
- NHL on Fox (1994–1999)
- Fox College Football
  - Cotton Bowl Classic (1999–2014)
  - Bowl Championship Series (2007–2010)
  - Pac-12 Football Championship Game (2011 and every other year from 2012 to 2022) (shared with ESPN/ABC)
  - Big 12 Football Championship Game (2017)
  - San Francisco Bowl (2016–2019)
- NFL on Fox
  - NFL Europe (1997–2005)
  - Pro Bowl (2008 and 2011)
  - NFL draft: Rounds 1–3 (2018; simulcast with NFL Network)
- Fox UFC (2011–2018)
- USGA Championships (2015–2019)
- Big3 (2017–2018)
- Davis Cup (2019)
- XFL (2020)
- Premier Boxing Champions (2015–2022)
- United States Football League/The Spring League (2021–2023, ownership stake since 2022)
- Major League Rugby Finals (2022–2024)

Motorsports

- Rolex 24 at Daytona (2002–2018)
- 24 Hours of Le Mans (2002–2017)
- Formula One (2007–2012)
- Formula E (2014–2020)
- Monster Energy AMA Supercross (2014–2018)
- WeatherTech SportsCar Championship (2014–2018)
- Monster Jam (2014–2018)
- NASCAR Xfinity Series (2001–2006, 2015–2024)

Other

- PBA on Fox (2018–2025)

Soccer

- UEFA Champions League (2009–2018)
- UEFA Europa League (2009–2018)
- US Open Cup (2000–2003, 2006–2011)
- USL First Division (2005–2009)
- USL Second Division (2002–2010)
- USL Premier Development League (2002–2011)
- USL Pro (2011)
- National Women's Soccer League (2013, 2015)
- W-League (2002–2011)
- Major Indoor Soccer League (2007–08)
- Copa Libertadores (2014–2018)
- International Champions Cup (2013–2015)
- Premier League (1998–2013)
- FA Cup (2014–2018)
- Scottish Premiership (2013–2017)
- A-League (2002–2004, 2013–2016)
- Copa América Centenario (2016)
- Bundesliga (2015–2020)
- U.S. men's national soccer team (2015–2022)
- U.S. women's national soccer team (2015–2022)
- FIFA Confederations Cup (2017)
- Copa Centroamericana (2017)
- FIFA Women's World Cup (2015, 2019, 2023)

Pro wrestling

- WWE SmackDown (2019–2024)

== Notable personalities ==
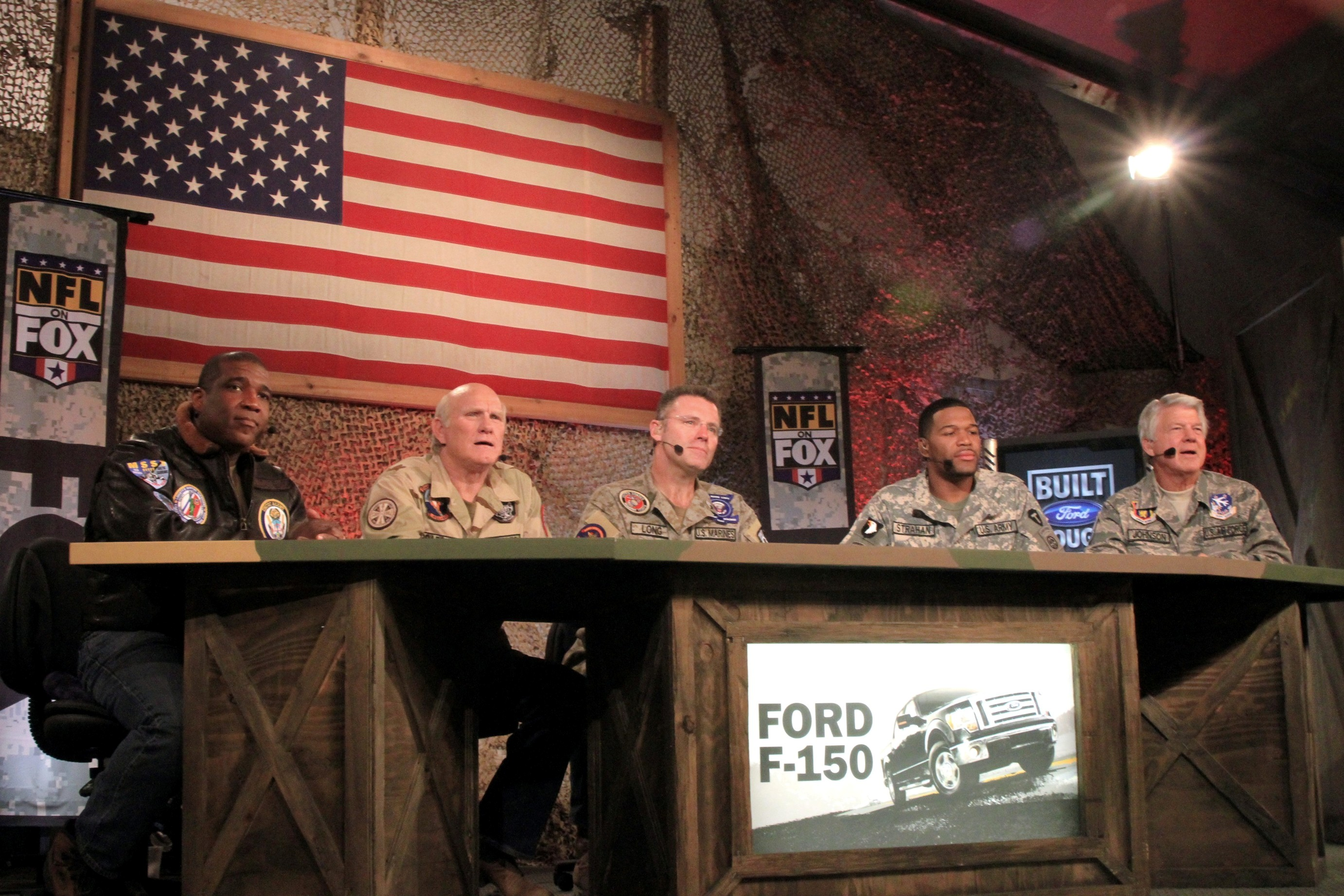
Fox NFL Sunday presenter Curt Menefee pictured with pundits Terry Bradshaw, Howie Long, Michael Strahan and Jimmy Johnson during a 2009 broadcast of the show in Afghanistan.

=== Current ===
==== Play-by-play ====
- NFL on Fox – Kevin Burkhardt, Joe Davis, Adam Amin, Kenny Albert, Kevin Kugler, Chris Myers, Brandon Gaudin, Tim Brando
- MLB on Fox – Joe Davis, Adam Amin, Kenny Albert, Aaron Goldsmith, Brandon Gaudin, Kevin Kugler, Connor Onion, Jeff Levering, Eric Collins, Trent Rush
- IndyCar Series on Fox – Will Buxton
- NASCAR on Fox – Mike Joy, Jamie Little, Eric Brennan, Brent Stover
- Fox College Football – Gus Johnson, Connor Onion, Tim Brando, Eric Collins, Dan Hellie, Noah Reed, Jack Kizer, Carlo Jimenez
- Fox College Hoops – Gus Johnson, Tim Brando, Kevin Kugler, Scott Graham, Eric Collins, Brian Anderson, Aaron Goldsmith, Brandon Gaudin, Adam Amin, Alex Faust, Jeff Levering, Kevin Burkhardt, Lisa Byington, Dave Sims, Kevin Fitzgerald, Wayne Randazzo, Benjamin Bernard, Matt Schumacker, Cindy Brunson, Guy Haberman, Greg Heister, Mark Clark, Pat O'Keefe, J.B Long, Chris Vosters, Jenny Cavnar, Connor Onion, Jason Ross Jr. Joe Rawson, Lane Grindle, Trent Rush, Derek Clark, John Ramey, David Gascon, Jacob Tobey, Darron Sutton, Matt Neverett, Sloane Martin, Greg Mescall, Ari Wolfe, Dan Hellie, Tim Neverett, Cory Provus, Jordan Kent, Rich Waltz, Chris Myers, Rich Cellini, Kenny Albert, AJ Kanell, Jack Kizer, Emmanuel Berbari, Jason Horowitz, Noah Reed, Nick Koop, Paul Dottino, Dan Kolko, Bob Brainerd, Jake Elsenberg, Alex Cohen, Kylen Mills, Carlo Jimenez, Gary Apple, Jake Marsh
- Fox Soccer – John Strong, JP Dellacamera, Glenn Davis, Mark Followill, Keith Costigan, Josh Eastern, Nate Bukaty, Callum Williams, Tyler Terens, Joe Malfa, Derek Rae, Ian Darke, Jacqui Oatley, Darren Fletcher
- Fox NHRA – Brian Lohnes
- UFL – Curt Menefee, Kevin Kugler
- Thoroughbred Racing on Fox Sports – Frank Mirahmadi

==== Analysts ====
- NFL on Fox – Terry Bradshaw, Howie Long, Michael Strahan, Rob Gronkowski, Jay Glazer, Charles Woodson, Julian Edelman, Tom Brady, Greg Olsen, Drew Brees, Jonathan Vilma, Daryl Johnston, Mark Schlereth, Brady Quinn, Matt Millen, Mike Pereira (rules analyst), Dean Blandino (rules analyst)
- MLB on Fox – John Smoltz, Tom Verducci, A. J. Pierzynski, Adam Wainwright, Eric Karros, Dontrelle Willis, Alex Rodriguez, David Ortiz, Nick Swisher, Derek Jeter, Mark Sweeney
- IndyCar Series on Fox – James Hinchcliffe, Townsend Bell
- NASCAR on Fox – Clint Bowyer, Kevin Harvick, Larry McReynolds, Michael Waltrip, Todd Bodine, Jamie McMurray, Phil Parsons, Trevor Bayne
- Fox College Football – Joel Klatt, Robert Griffin III, Devin Gardner, Mark Helfrich, Spencer Tillman, Robert Smith, Petros Papadakis, Brady Quinn, Matt Leinart, Mark Ingram II, Urban Meyer, Emmanuel Acho, Chris Petersen, Bruce Feldman, Mike Pereira (rules analyst), Dean Blandino (rules analyst)
- Fox College Hoops – Jim Jackson, Tarik Turner, Bill Raftery, Stephen Bardo, Brian Finneran, Isiah Thomas, Steve Smith, Dino Gaudio, Robbie Hummel, Donny Marshall, Nick Bahe, Doug Gottlieb, Sarah Kustok, Dickey Simpkins, Casey Jacobsen, Vin Parise, Jim Spanarkel, Stephen Howard, Danny Manning, Jess Settles, Bill Herenda, Richie Schueler, Freddie Schulz, Kim Adams, Austin Johnson, Megan McKeown, Matt Muehlebach, Mike DeCourcy, KJ Smith, Lamar Hurd, Dave Miller, LaVall Jordan, Terrence Oglesby, LaPhonso Ellis, Dan Dickau, Brian Butch, Joe Cravens, Devin Harris, John Giannini, Kris Jenkins, Jordan Taylor, Trent Meacham, LaChina Robinson, Darren Collison, Christy Winters-Scott, Debbie Antonelli, Nik Stauskas, Kevin O'Neill, Don MacLean, Ernie Kent, Ben Braun, Sean Elliott, Mary Murphy, Ashley Battle, Tammy Blackburn, Phil Martelli, Wesley Matthews, Elise Woodward, Rapheal Davis, Angela Taylor, Joan Bonvicini, Randy Foye, Miles Simon, Earl Watson, Isis Young
- Fox Soccer – Alexi Lalas, Stuart Holden, Landon Donovan, Maurice Edu, Warren Barton, Cobi Jones, Mariano Trujillo, Lloyd Sam, Carli Lloyd, Heather O'Reilly, Julie Ertz, Lori Lindsey, Joe Machnik (rules analyst), Mark Clattenburg (rules analyst)
- Fox NHRA – Tony Pedregon
- UFL – Joel Klatt, Devin Gardner, Jake Butt
- Thoroughbred Racing on Fox Sports – Thomas M. Amoss, Richard Migliore, Mike E. Smith

==== Reporters ====
- NFL on Fox – Erin Andrews, Tom Rinaldi, Pam Oliver, Kristina Pink, Megan Olivi, Allison Williams, Jen Hale, Sarah Kustok
- MLB on Fox – Ken Rosenthal, Tom Verducci, Tom Rinaldi
- NASCAR on Fox – Jamie Little, Regan Smith, Josh Sims, Jamie Howe, Amanda Busick, Kaitlyn Vincie, Alex Weaver
- IndyCar Series on Fox – Jack Harvey, Georgia Henneberry, Kevin Lee, Jamie Little
- Fox College Football – Jenny Taft, Alexa Landestoy, Josh Sims, Tom Rinaldi
- Fox College Hoops – Allison Williams
- Fox Soccer – Jenny Taft, Rodolfo Landeros, Tom Rinaldi
- Fox NHRA – Bruno Massel, Jamie Howe, Amanda Busick
- UFL – Jake Butt, Jenny Taft
- Thoroughbred Racing on Fox Sports – Tom Rinaldi, Maggie Wolfendale

==== Studio hosts ====
- NFL on Fox – Curt Menefee, Charissa Thompson
- MLB on Fox – Kevin Burkhardt, Chris Myers, Mike Hill
- NASCAR on Fox – Chris Myers, Kaitlyn Vincie
- Big Noon Kickoff – Rob Stone, Mike Hill
- Fox College Hoops – Rob Stone, Kevin Burkhardt, Mike Hill, Jenny Taft
- Fox Soccer – Rob Stone, Jules Breach, Jenny Taft, Rodolfo Landeros
- IndyCar Series on Fox – Chris Myers
- Thoroughbred Racing on Fox Sports – Curt Menefee, Charissa Thompson

=== Former ===
==== Play-by-play ====
- NFL on Fox – Joe Buck, Pat Summerall, Kevin Harlan, Mike Breen, Steve Buckhantz, Eric Clemons, Paul Kennedy, Steve Grad, Tim Ryan, Ray Bentley, Josh Lewin, Scott Graham, Doug Bell, Drew Goodman, Nick Halling, Dan Miller, Ron Pitts, Dave Pasch, Kevin Slaten, Spero Dedes, Matt Vasgersian, Craig Shemon, Carter Blackburn, Brad Sham, Dan McLaughlin, Matt Devlin, Steve Byrnes, Chris Rose, Craig Bolerjack, Tom McCarthy, Mike Goldberg, Matt Smith, Thom Brennaman, Sam Rosen, Dick Stockton, Gus Johnson, Alex Faust
  - Thursday Night Football – Joe Buck, Kevin Burkhardt, Adam Amin, Joe Davis, Curt Menefee
- NHL on Fox – Mike Emrick, Pat Foley, Kenny Albert, Sam Rosen, Dave Strader, Jiggs McDonald, Dick Stockton
- MLB on Fox – Joe Buck, Chip Caray, Thom Brennaman, Dick Stockton, Aaron Goldsmith, Jason Benetti
- NASCAR on Fox – Rick Allen, Vince Welch, Adam Alexander
- Fox College Football – Craig Bolerjack, Brian Custer, Aaron Goldsmith, Adam Alexander, Jason Benetti
- Fox College Hoops – Dick Stockton, Thom Brennaman, Justin Kutcher, Brian Custer, Vince Welch, Steve Physioc, Adam Alexander, John Fanta, Jason Benetti
- Fox Soccer – Max Bretos, Steve Cangialosi, Ross Dyer, Gus Johnson, Mark Rogondino, Dave Denholm, Adrian Garcia-Marquez
- PBA on Fox – Rob Stone, Dave Ryan
- Fox PBC – Gus Johnson, Brian Kenny, Brian Custer, Sean Grande, Chris Myers, Kenny Albert
- Fox UFC – Jon Anik, Mike Goldberg, Brendan Fitzgerald, John Gooden
- XFL – Curt Menefee, Kevin Burkhardt
- USFL – Curt Menefee, Kevin Kugler
- Fox USGA – Joe Buck, Justin Kutcher, Shane Bacon
- WWE Smackdown – Michael Cole, Kevin Patrick Egan, Corey Graves

==== Analysts ====
- NFL on Fox – Troy Aikman, Cris Collinsworth, John Madden, Bill Maas, Chad Pennington, Brian Billick, Tim Ryan, John Lynch, Donovan McNabb, Charles Davis, Chris Spielman, Tony Gonzalez, Aqib Talib, Sean Payton, Michael Vick, Jimmy Johnson, Peter Schrager, Mark Sanchez
  - Thursday Night Football – Troy Aikman, Terry Bradshaw, Howie Long, Michael Strahan, Jimmy Johnson, Jay Glazer, Mike Pereira
- NHL on Fox – John Davidson, Joe Micheletti
- MLB on Fox – Bob Brenly, Steve Lyons, Tim McCarver, Gabe Kapler, Pete Rose, Harold Reynolds, Frank Thomas
- NASCAR On Fox – Andy Petree, Darrell Waltrip, Jeff Hammond, Jeff Gordon
- Fox College Football – Charles Davis, Ryan Nece, Eddie George, Eric Crouch, Darius Walker, Bob Stoops, Reggie Bush, Brock Huard
- Fox Soccer – Brian McBride, Christopher Sullivan, Thomas Hitzlsperger, Jovan Kirovski, Eric Wynalda, Brian Dunseth, Mario Melchiot, Brad Friedel, Grant Wahl, Aly Wagner
- PBA on Fox – Randy Pedersen
- Fox PBC – Virgil Hunter, Danny Garcia, Abner Mares, Mikey Garcia, Robert Guerrero, Lennox Lewis, Ray Mancini, Shawn Porter, Larry Hazzard, Mark Kriegel
- Fox UFC – Joe Rogan, Daniel Cormier, Dominick Cruz, Michael Bisping, Kenny Florian, Paul Felder, Jimmy Smith, Brian Stann
- Fox USGA – Greg Norman, Paul Azinger
- Fox XFL – Joel Klatt, Greg Olsen
- WWE Smackdown – Corey Graves, Pat McAfee, JBL, Kevin Owens, Michael Cole, Road Dogg, Wade Barrett, Brad Nessler (select segment)

==== Reporters ====
- NFL on Fox – Ron Pitts, Tony Siragusa, D. J. Johnson, Matt Millen, Laura Okmin
  - Thursday Night Football – Erin Andrews, Kristina Pink
- MLB on Fox – Erin Andrews, Chris Myers
- NASCAR on Fox – Krista Voda, Dick Berggren, Jeanne Zelasko, Steve Byrnes, Chris Neville, Hermie Sadler, Alan Cavanna, Matt Yocum, Vince Welch
- Fox College Football – Molly McGrath, Shannon Spake
- PBA on Fox – Kimberly Pressler
- Fox Soccer – Julie Stewart-Binks, Katie Witham
- Fox PBC – Kristine Leahy, Megan Olivi, Heidi Androl
- Fox UFC – Megan Olivi, Heidi Androl, Ariel Helwani
- Fox XFL – Brock Huard, Jenny Taft, Cameron Jordan
- Fox USGA – Chris Myers
- WWE Smackdown – Kayla Braxton, Byron Saxton, Cathy Kelley

==== Studio hosts ====
- NFL on Fox – James Brown
  - Fox NFL Thursday – Curt Menefee, Michael Strahan
- First Things First – Nick Wright
- NHL on Fox – James Brown, Suzy Kolber
- MLB on Fox – Jeanne Zelasko, Chris Rose, Amber Theoharis
- NASCAR on Fox – Danielle Trotta, John Roberts, Shannon Spake, Adam Alexander
- Fox Soccer – Brendan Dunlop, Carlos Machado, Jeremy St. Louis, Kyle Martino, Lara Baldesarra, Lionel Bienvenu, Michelle Lissel, Mitch Peacock, Terri Leigh, Todd Grisham, Julie Stewart-Binks, Ian Joy, Kate Abdo, Sara Walsh
- Fox Sports Live – Jay Onrait, Dan O'Toole, Charissa Thompson, Don Bell
- Fox PBC – Chris Myers, Kenny Albert, Kate Abdo
- Fox UFC – Jay Glazer, Karyn Bryant
- Fox USGA – Lindsay Czarniak
- Rat Race – Chris Myers, Kevin Frazier

=== Presidents ===
- David Hill (1993–2000)
- Ed Goren (2000–2010)
- Eric Shanks (2010–present)

== Other media ==
The "Fox Sports" name has been used in other sports media assets.

- FoxSports.com, a web site operated by Fox Sports Interactive Media, provides sports news online.
- The Fox Sports College Hoops '99 basketball video game is published by their Fox Interactive division.

=== Outside the United States ===
- Fox Sports Australia is owned and operated by Foxtel, in turn owned by DAZN. The Murdoch family formerly held a stake in Fox Sports Australia through News Corp Australia.
- Fox Sports Japan was also joint-owned by the Murdoch family and SoftBank Group that operated Fox Sports & Entertainment in Japan.
- Fox Sports Argentina is owned and operated by Mediapro.

== See also ==
=== Related articles ===
- NFL on television
- Fox Broadcasting Company
- Fox Sports Radio
- Fox Sports Australia
- Fox Sports International

=== Main competitors ===
- Skydance Sports
  - TNT Sports
  - CBS Sports
    - CBS Sports Network
- ESPN/ABC
  - ESPN2
- NBC Sports
  - NBCSN
  - Peacock
