= List of Thoroughbred Racing on Fox Sports commentators =

The following is a list of commentators who have broadcast thoroughbred racing events for Fox Sports.

== Race callers ==
- Larry Collmus
- Trevor Denman
- Tom Durkin
- Craig Evans
- John Hunt
- Travis Stone
- Frank Mirahmadi

== Hosts ==
- Kenny Albert
- Joe Buck
- Paul Lo Duca
- Nick Luck
- Curt Menefee
- Jessica Otten
- Laffit Pincay III
- Rishi Persad
- Charissa Thompson
- Greg Wolff
- Michelle Yu

== Analysts ==
- Tom Amoss
- Simon Bray
- Matt Bernier
- Bernard Condren
- Ron Ellis
- Chris Fallica
- Jonathon Kinchen
- Nick Lightfoot
- Angus McNae
- Richard Migliore
- Jay Privman
- Andy Serling
- Mike Smith
- Anthony Stabile
- Tom Stanley
- Gary Stevens
- Ruby Walsh

== Reporters ==
- Alyssa Ali
- Caton Bredar
- Acacia Clement
- Gabby Gaudet
- Suzy Kolber
- Hayley Moore
- Tom Rinaldi
- Emma Spencer
- Maggie Wolfendale
