= Fox NFL Sunday =

American television series

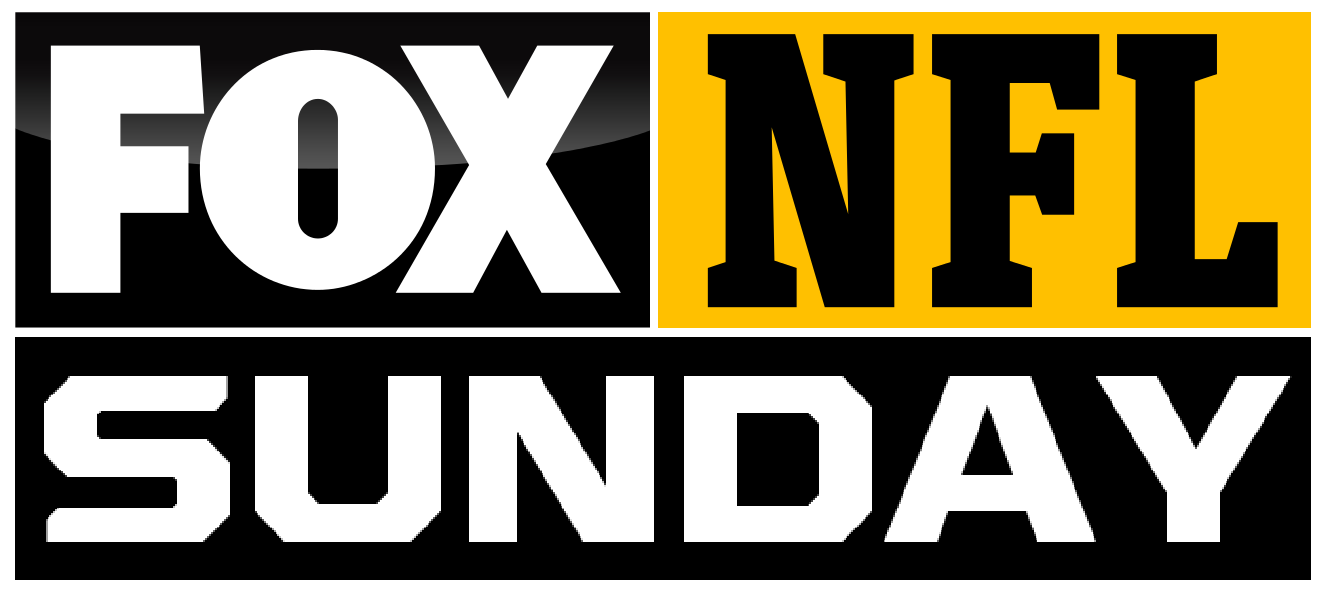
- Logo used since 2014
- Genre: Pre-game, halftime and post-game show
- Presented by: Curt Menefee; Terry Bradshaw; Howie Long; Michael Strahan; Rob Gronkowski; Jay Glazer; Erin Andrews; Pam Oliver; Mike Pereira (for past hosts, see article)
- Narrated by: Dick Ervasti (1994–2001); John Garry (2006–2024)
- Theme music composer: Scott Schreer
- Opening theme: "NFL on Fox theme music"
- Ending theme: Same as opening
- Composer: Scott Schreer
- Country of origin: United States
- Original language: English
- No. of seasons: 33 (through 2026 season)
- No. of episodes: 3,300+

Production
- Production locations: Fox Network Center (Fox Studio Lot Building 101), 10201 West Pico Boulevard, Century City, Los Angeles, California
- Camera setup: Multi-camera
- Running time: 60 minutes
- Production companies: National Football League; Fox Sports

Original release
- Network: Fox
- Release: September 4, 1994 – present

Related
- Fox NFL Kickoff

Fox NFL Sunday is an American sports television program broadcast on the Fox television network. The show debuted on September 4, 1994 and serves as the pre-game, halftime and post-game show for the network's National Football League (NFL) game telecasts under the NFL on Fox brand. An audio simulcast of the program airs on sister radio network Fox Sports Radio, which is distributed by Premiere Radio Networks. As of 2014, the program has won four Emmy Awards.

For sponsorship purposes, the show's full name is Fox NFL Sunday Presented by GMC.

== History ==
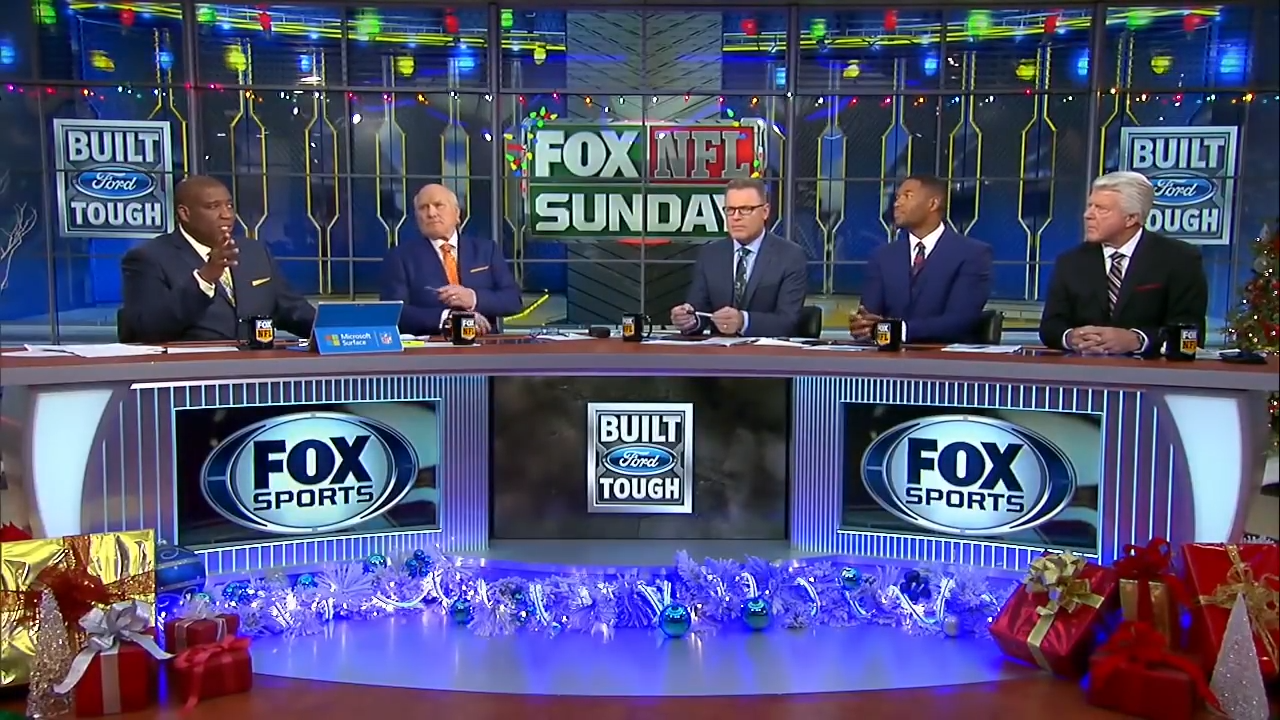
(L to R): Curt Menefee, Terry Bradshaw, Howie Long, Michael Strahan, and Jimmy Johnson on set in December 2018

=== 1994–1997 ===
Fox NFL Sunday debuted on September 4, 1994, when Fox inaugurated its NFL game broadcasts through the network's recently acquired broadcast rights to the National Football Conference (NFC); it was originally hosted by James Brown, Terry Bradshaw, Howie Long and Jimmy Johnson (both Brown and Bradshaw had joined the network from CBS to help helm Fox's NFL coverage). The program was notable in being the first hour-long NFL pregame show on a broadcast television network; network pregame programs that existed beforehand, such as CBS' The NFL Today or NBC's NFL Live!, aired as 30-minute broadcasts. Fox's show also adopted a looser, more irreverent approach than its predecessors in order to also appeal to the network's younger-skewing audiences. Fox NFL Sunday was also the first network pregame program to originate from Los Angeles, whereas the CBS and NBC pregame shows were produced in New York City (CBS continues to broadcast its pregame from New York, while NBC uses facilities in Stamford, Connecticut).

During Jimmy Johnson's initial season on Fox NFL Sunday, he would often join the show via satellite from his home in Florida. There was much speculation that Johnson would return to coaching during the first year of the program's run. Prior to the end of the year, Johnson made an "announcement", saying he was happy with his new career in broadcasting. But in 1996, he left the program to become head coach of the Miami Dolphins; Ronnie Lott was brought in to succeed him, and stayed with the program for two seasons.

During Jimmy Johnson's initial run on the show, the opening introduction would typically feature a comedic skit involving several or all of the hosts.

On-location broadcast sites

Week	Location
Week 3 (1997) (September 14)	FedExField (Arizona Cardinals at Washington Redskins)
Week 4 (1997) (September 21)	Lambeau Field (Minnesota Vikings at Green Bay Packers)
Week 6 (1997) (October 5)	Lambeau Field (Tampa Bay Buccaneers at Green Bay Packers)
Week 13 (1997) (November 23)	Lambeau Field (Dallas Cowboys at Green Bay Packers)
Divisional Playoffs (1997) (January 4)	Lambeau Field (Tampa Bay Buccaneers at Green Bay Packers)

=== 1998–2002 ===
In 1998, on the heels of NBC losing the broadcast rights to the NFL's American Football Conference (AFC) to CBS, Cris Collinsworth joined Fox NFL Sunday as an analyst – subsequently replacing Ronnie Lott.

During this period, promotional claymation spots and teases became a popular fixture on the program, in which the four hosts were depicted as animated characters in live-action situations, usually starring real-life NFL players. Beginning with the 1999 season, comedian Jimmy Kimmel (then the co-host of Comedy Central's The Man Show and Win Ben Stein's Money) began making weekly game predictions and performing comedy skits on the show; the following year, Jillian Barberie (then the weather anchor/co-host of Los Angeles Fox owned-and-operated station KTTV's Good Day L.A.) was added to the program to provide weather forecasts for each week's game sites.

On-location broadcast sites

Week	Location
Week 1 (1998) (September 6)	Giants Stadium (Washington Redskins at New York Giants)
Week 7 (1999) (October 24)	(Washington Redskins at Dallas Cowboys)
Week 15 (1999) (December 19)	RCA Dome (Washington Redskins at Indianapolis Colts)
NFC Championship (1999) (January 23, 2000)	Trans World Dome (Tampa Bay Buccaneers at St. Louis Rams)
Week 17 (2000) (December 23 and 24)	On board the USS Harry S. Truman
NFC Championship (2000) (January 14, 2001)	Giants Stadium (Minnesota Vikings at New York Giants)
Week 3 (2002) (September 22)	Ford Field (Green Bay Packers at Detroit Lions; inaugural game at Ford Field)

=== 2002–2005 ===
Cris Collinsworth left the program in 2002, when he was promoted to Fox's newly formed "A Team" of NFL game announcers, alongside Joe Buck and Troy Aikman (replacing Pat Summerall and John Madden). Fox produced several promos featuring Buck, Collinsworth and Aikman dressed as characters from the popular 1980s action series of the same name to promote the network's NFL coverage.

Initially, the vacated fourth seat was to feature a rotating series of guest analysts, with Jimmy Johnson returning in Week 1. John Elway sat in during Week 2. For Week 3, Johnson returned, and took over the position permanently (he remained on the program until his retirement after Super Bowl LIX). Jimmy Kimmel left the program after the 2002 season a month before the premiere of his late-night talk show on ABC, Jimmy Kimmel Live!. He was replaced by comedian Frank Caliendo – at the time, a cast member on Fox's late night sketch comedy series MADtv – who had previously guest starred during Kimmel's skits (performing his well-known impersonation of John Madden). Caliendo's prognostication skits began to feature his various spot-on celebrity impersonations, including Madden, Jay Leno, Jim Rome and George W. Bush, as well as show hosts Brown, Bradshaw, Long and Johnson. James Brown left the program after the 2005 season, in order to return to CBS to host its rival pregame show The NFL Today.

On-location broadcast sites

Date	Location (Game)
Week 8 (2003) (October 26)	Heinz Field (St. Louis Rams at Pittsburgh Steelers)
Week 6 (2004) (October 17)	Gillette Stadium (Seattle Seahawks at New England Patriots)

2005 was the last season in which Fox (along with CBS) aired Saturday afternoon NFL games towards the end of the regular season in December. On these occasions, Fox would precede its coverage with a studio pregame show titled Fox NFL Saturday, which had no change in format outside of the day in the title.

=== 2006–2007 ===
On August 13, 2006, Fox announced that Joe Buck and Curt Menefee would succeed James Brown as hosts of the program. Because Buck was already serving as the lead play-by-play announcer for the NFL on Fox game broadcasts, each week's edition of Fox NFL Sunday was broadcast from the site of the network's top game of the week, in a move similar to Fox's NASCAR coverage, in which the pre-race show is telecast from the site of that week's race. Menefee hosted the halftime and postgame segments on location with the Fox NFL Sunday crew. Chris Rose served as the update host during game breaks. As a result of Buck going on assignment for Fox's MLB postseason coverage, Menefee substituted for Buck as the full-time host from Hollywood. During Weeks 6 through 8, while the show broadcast from Hollywood, Jillian Reynolds (née Barberie) returned as weather anchor for the game-day forecast segments.

During Weeks 16 and 17, Buck served as the full-time host from Hollywood, with the rest of the Fox NFL Sunday crew. Dick Stockton took over as the main play-by-play analyst alongside Troy Aikman and Pam Oliver, while Menefee returned to the booth as secondary play-by-play analyst alongside Daryl Johnston and Tony Siragusa. Though the show returned to Hollywood for two weeks, Jillian Reynolds was absent, presumably having gone on maternity leave, as she was pregnant with her first child at the time.

During Wild Card weekend, Menefee substituted for Buck as host of the Hollywood-originated pregame show broadcast. Meanwhile, Buck called the January 7, 2007 game between the New York Giants at the Philadelphia Eagles. During the Divisional Playoffs, Menefee once again substituted for Joe Buck as host, as the pregame show again originated from Hollywood for both games. Stockton called the Saturday, January 13 game between the Philadelphia Eagles at the New Orleans Saints and Buck called the Sunday, January 14 game between the Seattle Seahawks at the Chicago Bears.

For the 2006 NFC Championship Game between the New Orleans Saints and Chicago Bears on January 21, 2007, Joe Buck hosted the pregame show with the Fox NFL Sunday crew on location from Soldier Field. After Buck joined Aikman for play-by-play duties, Menefee took over as host for the remainder of the game and hosted the halftime and postgame shows. Terry Bradshaw handled the trophy ceremony during the postgame show.

2006–2007 on-location broadcast sites

Week	Location (Game)
Preseason Week 1 (August 14, 2006)	Fox Hollywood Studio 2A (Indianapolis Colts at St. Louis Rams)
Preseason Week 2 (August 18, 2006)	Giants Stadium (Kansas City Chiefs at New York Giants)
Preseason Week 3 (August 24, 2006)	Bank of America Stadium (Miami Dolphins at Carolina Panthers)
Week 1 (September 10, 2006)	Alltel Stadium (Dallas Cowboys at Jacksonville Jaguars)
Week 2 (September 17, 2006)	Lincoln Financial Field (New York Giants at Philadelphia Eagles)
Week 3 (September 24, 2006)	Qwest Field (New York Giants at Seattle Seahawks)
Week 4 (October 1, 2006)	Bank of America Stadium (New Orleans Saints at Carolina Panthers)
Week 5 (October 8, 2006)	Lincoln Financial Field (Dallas Cowboys at Philadelphia Eagles)
Week 6 (October 15, 2006)	Fox Hollywood Studio 2A
Week 7 (October 22, 2006)	Fox Hollywood Studio 2A
Week 8 (October 29, 2006)	Fox Hollywood Studio 2A
Week 9 (November 5, 2006)	FedExField (Dallas Cowboys at Washington Redskins)
Week 10 (November 12, 2006)	Heinz Field (New Orleans Saints at Pittsburgh Steelers)
Week 11 (November 19, 2006)	Giants Stadium (Chicago Bears at New York Jets)
Week 12 (Thanksgiving) (November 23, 2006)	Texas Stadium (Tampa Bay Buccaneers at Dallas Cowboys)
Week 12 (Sunday) (November 26, 2006)	Gillette Stadium (Chicago Bears at New England Patriots)
Week 13 (December 3, 2006)	Giants Stadium (Dallas Cowboys at New York Giants)
Week 14 (December 10, 2006)	Bank of America Stadium (New York Giants at Carolina Panthers)
Week 15 (December 17, 2006)	Giants Stadium (Philadelphia Eagles at New York Giants)
Week 16 (December 24, 2006)	Fox Hollywood Studio 2A
Week 17 (December 31, 2006)	Fox Hollywood Studio 2A
NFC Wild Card Playoff (Sunday) (January 7, 2007)	Fox Hollywood Studio 2A
NFC Divisional Playoff (Saturday) (January 13, 2007)	Fox Hollywood Studio 2A
NFC Divisional Playoff (Sunday) (January 14, 2007)	Fox Hollywood Studio 2A
NFC Championship Game (January 21, 2007)	Soldier Field (New Orleans Saints at Chicago Bears)

=== 2007–present ===
In March 2007, it was announced that the program (then branded on-air as The Built Ford Tough Fox NFL Sunday, via a sponsorship agreement with Ford Motor Company) would resume studio broadcasts for the 2007 season, with Curt Menefee assuming full-time hosting duties and Joe Buck reverting to play-by-play only. Jillian Reynolds, who was coming off maternity leave, returned full-time as the program's weather anchor. However, the pre-game show was on-site at Lambeau Field for the 2007 NFC Championship Game between the New York Giants and the Green Bay Packers and at Super Bowl XLII.

For the 2007 season, Fox NFL Sunday introduced a new feature, a pre-recorded segment titled "Grumpy Old Coaches", in which Jimmy Johnson and fellow former Dallas Cowboys head coach Barry Switzer discuss the past week in football. A segment of highlights and commentary of the previous day's college football games was also featured, as a gesture to Fox's then recent acquisition of broadcast rights to the Bowl Championship Series (BCS). This segment was dropped following the 2007 season.

On June 24, 2008, it was announced that former New York Giants defensive end Michael Strahan would join the show as an analyst. On November 8, 2009, a special two-hour edition of the program was broadcast on-location from Afghanistan, featuring an audience of U.S. soldiers. While the regular Fox NFL Sunday crew did the pregame show, Chris Rose served as the studio host and anchored the in-game highlights, as John Lynch and Trent Green served as studio analysts for the halftime and post-game reports during the broadcast. On January 24, 2010, Fox NFL Sunday broadcast on-location from New Orleans for the 2009 NFC Championship Game.

On January 23, 2011, Fox NFL Sunday also broadcast an on-location edition at Soldier Field in Chicago for the 2010 NFC Championship Game; the program held its Super Bowl XLV pregame show in Arlington, Texas on February 6, 2011.

Starting with the 2011 NFL season, the show introduced a new feature called "Fox :45", which is usually formatted a sing-along parody of a famous song, or as a comedic sketch. The parodies and sketches usually relate to current events occurring during the football season. The program also introduced the "Twitter Tracker", which scrolls tweets from NFL players and coaches.

On August 2, 2012, Frank Caliendo announced on his official Twitter account that he would not return to Fox NFL Sunday as a prognosticator for the 2012 season; comedian and former Saturday Night Live cast member Rob Riggle was eventually named as his replacement.

On December 6, 2015, a special two-hour edition of Fox NFL Sunday was broadcast from Ford Island at Pearl Harbor, Hawaii. The location was chosen to commemorate the 74th anniversary of the Attack on Pearl Harbor, with the USS Missouri being featured in the backdrop of the broadcast.

On September 11, 2016, Fox NFL Sunday was broadcast on location in Houston (the host city of Super Bowl LI) for the start of the 2016 NFL season. This also marked Curt Menefee's tenth season as full-time host of the pregame show. While the crew did the pregame, halftime and post-game shows, Charissa Thompson (host of Fox NFL Kickoff) served as the studio host and anchored the in-game highlights.

Riggle left the program after the 2019 season and wasn't replaced, with the role of prognosticator dropped from the program starting with the 2020 season.

During the 2020 season due to COVID-19 concerns, Jimmy Johnson was not in the studio, working remotely from Florida as a precaution. Then for the games on November 22, the whole team was momentarily replaced due to greater COVID-19 restrictions within the state of California, with Chris Myers taking over the hosting duties and former players Reggie Bush and Charles Woodson taking over the analyst's roles. Once the Thanksgiving games were underway the regular crew came back minus Bradshaw.

In May 2022, it was announced that former New Orleans Saints coach Sean Payton would be joining as an analyst on days when Jimmy Johnson would be out.

== On-air staff ==
- Curt Menefee – studio host (2006–present)
- Terry Bradshaw – analyst/co-host (1994-present)
- Howie Long – analyst (1994–present)
- Michael Strahan – analyst (2008–present)
- Rob Gronkowski – analyst (2019; 2022–present)
- Jay Glazer – NFL insider (2007–present)
- Mike Pereira – rules analyst (2010–present)
- Erin Andrews – reporter (2012–present)
- Pam Oliver – reporter (1995–present)
- Chris Myers – postseason reporter/fill-in studio host (2003–present)
- Charissa Thompson - reporter (2018–present)

=== Former on-air staff ===
- Jillian Barberie – weather anchor (2000–2005, guest appearances in 2006, 2007, 2008)
- James Brown – studio host (1994–2005)
- Joe Buck – pregame and postgame host (2006)
- Frank Caliendo – prognostication (2003–2011)
- Jim Cantore – weather anchor (1999)
- Cris Collinsworth – analyst (1998–2001)
- Tony Gonzalez - analyst (2017–2020)
- Priscilla Hojiwala – reporter (1999–2006)
- "Cousin Sal" Iacono – prognostication (guest star with Kimmel in 2002)
- Jimmy Johnson – analyst (1994–1995; 2002–2024)
- Jimmy Kimmel – prognostication (1999–2002, guest appearances in 2007)
- Ronnie Lott – analyst (1996–1997)
- Sean Payton – analyst (2022)
- Rob Riggle – prognostication (2012–2019)
- Barry Switzer – analyst (2007)
- Jeanne Zelasko – reporter (1996–2008)

=== On-air staff chart ===
Season	Studio host	Studio analysts	Prognosticator
1994	James Brown	Terry Bradshaw; Howie Long; Jimmy Johnson	
1995	James Brown	Terry Bradshaw; Howie Long; Jimmy Johnson	
1996	James Brown	Terry Bradshaw; Howie Long; Ronnie Lott	
1997	James Brown	Terry Bradshaw; Howie Long; Ronnie Lott	
1998	James Brown	Terry Bradshaw; Howie Long; Cris Collinsworth	
1999	James Brown	Terry Bradshaw; Howie Long; Cris Collinsworth	Jimmy Kimmel
2000	James Brown	Terry Bradshaw; Howie Long; Cris Collinsworth	Jimmy Kimmel
2001	James Brown	Terry Bradshaw; Howie Long; Cris Collinsworth	Jimmy Kimmel
2002	James Brown	Terry Bradshaw; Howie Long; Jimmy Johnson	Jimmy Kimmel
2003	James Brown	Terry Bradshaw; Howie Long; Jimmy Johnson	Frank Caliendo
2004	James Brown	Terry Bradshaw; Howie Long; Jimmy Johnson	Frank Caliendo
2005	James Brown	Terry Bradshaw; Howie Long; Jimmy Johnson	Frank Caliendo
2006	Joe Buck (pregame host); Curt Menefee (halftime host)	Terry Bradshaw; Howie Long; Jimmy Johnson	Frank Caliendo
2007	Curt Menefee	Terry Bradshaw; Howie Long; Jimmy Johnson; Barry Switzer	Frank Caliendo
2008	Curt Menefee	Terry Bradshaw; Howie Long; Jimmy Johnson; Michael Strahan	Frank Caliendo
2009	Curt Menefee	Terry Bradshaw; Howie Long; Jimmy Johnson; Michael Strahan	Frank Caliendo
2010	Curt Menefee	Terry Bradshaw; Howie Long; Jimmy Johnson; Michael Strahan	Frank Caliendo
2011	Curt Menefee	Terry Bradshaw; Howie Long; Jimmy Johnson; Michael Strahan	Frank Caliendo
2012	Curt Menefee	Terry Bradshaw; Howie Long; Jimmy Johnson; Michael Strahan	Rob Riggle
2013	Curt Menefee	Terry Bradshaw; Howie Long; Jimmy Johnson; Michael Strahan	Rob Riggle
2014	Curt Menefee	Terry Bradshaw; Howie Long; Jimmy Johnson; Michael Strahan	Rob Riggle
2015	Curt Menefee	Terry Bradshaw; Howie Long; Jimmy Johnson; Michael Strahan	Rob Riggle
2016	Curt Menefee	Terry Bradshaw; Howie Long; Jimmy Johnson; Michael Strahan	Rob Riggle
2017	Curt Menefee	Terry Bradshaw; Howie Long; Jimmy Johnson; Michael Strahan	Rob Riggle
2018	Curt Menefee	Terry Bradshaw; Howie Long; Jimmy Johnson; Michael Strahan	Rob Riggle
2019	Curt Menefee	Terry Bradshaw; Howie Long; Jimmy Johnson; Michael Strahan	Rob Riggle
2020	Curt Menefee	Terry Bradshaw; Howie Long; Jimmy Johnson; Michael Strahan	
2021	Curt Menefee	Terry Bradshaw; Howie Long; Jimmy Johnson; Michael Strahan	
2022	Curt Menefee	Terry Bradshaw; Howie Long; Jimmy Johnson; Michael Strahan	
2023	Curt Menefee	Terry Bradshaw; Howie Long; Jimmy Johnson; Michael Strahan	
2024	Curt Menefee	Terry Bradshaw; Howie Long; Jimmy Johnson; Michael Strahan	

== Cleatus the Robot ==
Comic book-style Cleatus logo used in the graphics of the NFL on Fox since 2019.

"Cleatus the Robot" is an animated robot character that serves as the official mascot for Fox NFL Sunday, and the entirety of Fox Sports. Cleatus's design, which was inspired by the eight-year old son of the executive vice president of Fox Sports, Gary Hartley, was a graphic interpretation of a "hybrid robotic football-player-slash-cowboy." It was named through a viewer contest held in the winter of 2007, in which fans were asked to submit entries to select the robot's name. Cleatus made his first appearance on the program during the 2005–06 NFL season, but was not used regularly until the following season. The character was designed by Legacy Effects.

Cleatus mainly appears during the opening sequence of the program, as well as during end-of-break sponsorship tags within the program and during game telecasts, certain identifications for Fox Sports used to close sports broadcasts and as a cue to Fox stations to air local advertisements during commercial breaks, and brief promotions for movies and television series. In the latter instance, he commonly gets attacked by a CGI character from the subject of the advertisement (such as Iron Man, a dragon from the movie Eragon, a T-1000 robot from the Fox drama Terminator: The Sarah Connor Chronicles, and The Burger King, who taunted Cleatus by throwing objects at him). Cleatus is also seen doing various things such as hopping on two feet, playing an electric guitar, shaking out his limbs, and performing dance moves such as The Swim and the Electric Slide; during the Fox broadcast of a Denver Broncos game on December 11, 2011, he also Tebowed (the kneeling prayer position popularized by former Broncos player Tim Tebow).

Games aired on the weekend following New Year's Day typically show Cleatus sitting on a bench holding an ice pack to his head, as if nursing a hangover. During the MLB postseason in October until the conclusion of the World Series (both of which air on Fox), the character is also seen taking baseballs from a basket and hitting them with a bat towards the background. Cleatus is usually replaced with a robotic turkey during Fox's Thanksgiving NFL game broadcasts.

Fox has since manufactured an action figure of the character, which it sells on the Fox Sports website, available in the character's normal appearance as well as in special uniforms customized for all 32 NFL franchises.

In response to the creation of Cleatus, Fox Sports created Digger, an animated gopher mascot for NASCAR on Fox telecasts; the character was originally seen only during the races when the in-track cameras knowns as the "Digger Cam" were shown, but his role soon expanded. Unlike Cleatus, however, Digger was not well received by fans, and sparked an internet and Twitter outcry for his removal from the broadcast. While Digger was featured heavily in 2009, he only made cameo appearances in 2010 before being phased out completely the following year. Starting in 2014, Frank Krimel is the driver of Fox Sports 1 Cleatus competing in Monster Jam.

Cleatus was included in an episode of The Simpsons, "The Spy Who Learned Me", and in sketches on Late Night with Conan O'Brien.

During the 2019 WWE draft, Cleatus the Robot would appear in war room-style backstage vignettes with actors portraying Fox executives making selections for the WWE Smackdown brand.

Sky Sports in the United Kingdom, which was until October 2018 owned by 21st Century Fox, uses a modified version of the Cleatus opening sequence and sponsorship tags with their own branding.

Cleatus celebrated his 20th birthday during the 2025 NFL season. During the season, Cleatus was featured in an episode of NFL Films Presents, in which a mascot version of Cleatus visited SoFi Stadium and celebrated his birthday alongside NFL on Fox announcers Kevin Kugler, Daryl Johnston and Allison Williams.

== See also ==
- The NFL Today
- Football Night in America
- Sunday NFL Countdown
- List of Super Bowl broadcasters
