= Fox UFC =

UFC MMA events broadcast on Fox Sports

- Logo
- Also known as: Fox UFC Saturday; FS1 UFC Fight Night; FXX UFC Fight Night
- Genre: Mixed martial arts telecasts
- Presented by: (see section)
- Country of origin: United States
- Original language: English
- No. of seasons: 4

Production
- Production location: All locations in arenas
- Camera setup: Multi-camera
- Running time: 180 minutes or until game ends
- Production companies: Zuffa; Fox Sports

Original release
- Network: Fox (2011–2018); Fox Deportes (2011–2018); FX (2012–2018); Fuel TV (2012–2013); Fox Sports 1 (2013–2018); Fox Sports 2 (2013–2018); FXX (2017–2018)
- Release: November 12, 2011 – December 15, 2018

Related
- UFC on ESPN

Fox UFC Fight Night (previously referred as Fox UFC Saturday for broadcasts on Fox or FS1 UFC Fight Night for broadcasts on other Fox-owned properties) was the branding used for telecasts of mixed martial art competitions from the Ultimate Fighting Championship (UFC) that were produced by Fox Sports. Previously, UFC on Fox was also used as a blanket title for UFC events aired on the Fox network, although since the concurrent launch of Fox Sports 1 and rebranding of Fuel TV as Fox Sports 2 in August 2013, all live UFC broadcasts on Fox-owned networks (including preliminaries, UFC Fight Night and The Ultimate Fighter Finale) have since used the name.

== History ==
Former logo

On August 18, 2011, the Ultimate Fighting Championship reached a seven-year broadcast agreement with Fox Sports, giving it the rights to televise matches sanctioned by the promotion through 2018, ending the UFC's relationship with cable channel Spike. Through the agreement, Fox Sports will air four live events per year in either prime time or late night, as well as other UFC programming (including UFC Fight Night, Road to the Octagon and The Ultimate Fighter) on its various broadcast and cable properties, including on Fox, FX and Fuel TV. The deal was significant as it marked the first time that the UFC would televise its events on terrestrial television in the United States.

Incidentally, MyNetworkTV (a sister network-turned-programming service of the Fox broadcast network) previously carried events from the International Fight League, then a competitor to the UFC, from September to November 2007 under a time-buy arrangement until the UFC purchased that promotion (MyNetworkTV is not included in Fox Sports' UFC agreement). The first UFC event to air as part of the agreement was a title card between Junior dos Santos and Cain Velasquez, which aired on Fox on November 12, 2011.

The broadcast partnership between Fox and the UFC ended at the conclusion of 2018 as the promotion signed a new broadcast deal with ESPN that began in January 2019.

== Commentators ==
=== On-air staff ===
- Jon Anik – commentator (2012–2018)
- Karyn Bryant – reporter (2013–2018)
- Joe Buck – studio host (2011)
- Daniel Cormier – analyst/commentator (2014–2018)
- Dominick Cruz – analyst/commentator (2014–2018)
- Nicole Dabeau – studio host/reporter (2012–2013)
- Brendan Fitzgerald – commentator (2017–2018)
- Kenny Florian – studio host/analyst (2012–2018)
- Jay Glazer – studio host (2011–2013)
- Mike Goldberg – commentator (2011-2016)
- Ariel Helwani – reporter (2014–2016)
- Curt Menefee – studio host (2012–2018)
- Joe Rogan – commentator (2011–2018)
- Jimmy Smith – analyst/commentator (2018)
- Brian Stann – analyst (2012–2017)

== Broadcast history ==
All matches listed are for those broadcast on the Fox network.

Match	Date	Venue
Velasquez vs. dos Santos	November 12, 2011	Honda Center, Anaheim, California
Evans vs. Davis	January 28, 2012	United Center, Chicago, Illinois
Diaz vs. Miller	May 5, 2012	Izod Center, East Rutherford, New Jersey
Shogun vs. Vera	August 4, 2012	Staples Center, Los Angeles, California
Henderson vs. Diaz	December 8, 2012	KeyArena, Seattle, Washington
Johnson vs. Dodson	January 26, 2013	United Center, Chicago, Illinois
Henderson vs. Melendez	April 20, 2013	HP Pavilion, San Jose, California
Johnson vs. Moraga	July 27, 2013	KeyArena, Seattle, Washington
Johnson vs. Benavidez 2	December 14, 2013	Sleep Train Arena, Sacramento, California
Henderson vs. Thomson	January 25, 2014	United Center, Chicago, Illinois
Werdum vs. Browne	April 19, 2014	Amway Center, Orlando, Florida
Lawler vs. Brown	July 26, 2014	SAP Center, San Jose, California
dos Santos vs. Miocic	December 13, 2014	US Airways Center, Phoenix, Arizona
Gustafsson vs. Johnson	January 24, 2015	Tele2 Arena, Stockholm, Sweden
Machida vs. Rockhold	April 18, 2015	Prudential Center, Newark, New Jersey
Dillashaw vs. Barão 2	July 25, 2015	United Center, Chicago, Illinois
dos Anjos vs. Cerrone 2	December 19, 2015	Amway Center, Orlando, Florida
Johnson vs. Bader	January 30, 2016	Prudential Center, Newark, New Jersey
Teixeira vs. Evans	April 16, 2016	Amalie Arena, Tampa, Florida
Holm vs. Shevchenko	July 23, 2016	United Center, Chicago, Illinois
Maia vs. Condit	August 27, 2016	Rogers Arena, Vancouver, British Columbia, Canada
VanZant vs. Waterson	December 17, 2016	Golden 1 Center, Sacramento, California
Shevchenko vs. Peña	January 28, 2017	Pepsi Center, Denver, Colorado
Johnson vs. Reis	April 15, 2017	Sprint Center, Kansas City, Missouri
Weidman vs. Gastelum	July 22, 2017	Nassau Veterans Memorial Coliseum, Uniondale, New York
Lawler vs. dos Anjos	December 16, 2017	Bell MTS Place, Winnipeg, Manitoba, Canada
Jacaré vs. Brunson 2	January 27, 2018	Spectrum Center, Charlotte, North Carolina
Emmett vs. Stephens	February 24, 2018	Amway Center, Orlando, Florida
Poirier vs. Gaethje	April 14, 2018	Gila River Arena, Glendale, Arizona
Alvarez vs. Poirier 2	July 28, 2018	Scotiabank Saddledome, Calgary, Alberta, Canada
Lee vs. Iaquinta 2	December 15, 2018	Fiserv Forum, Milwaukee, Wisconsin
