= Fox NFL Kickoff =

American football television series

- Alternate horizontal version of program logo used since September 2015
- Genre: Pre-game show
- Presented by: Charissa Thompson; Charles Woodson; Julian Edelman; Colin Cowherd; Cooper Manning (for past hosts and analysts, see article)
- Narrated by: John Garry (2013–present)
- Theme music composer: Scott Schreer
- Opening theme: "NFL on Fox theme music"
- Ending theme: Same as opening
- Composer: Scott Schreer
- Country of origin: United States
- Original language: English
- No. of seasons: 14 (through 2026 season)
- No. of episodes: 1,330+

Production
- Production locations: Fox Network Center (Fox Studio Lot Building 101), 10201 West Pico Boulevard, Century City, Los Angeles, California
- Camera setup: Multi-camera
- Running time: 60 minutes
- Production companies: National Football League; Fox Sports

Original release
- Network: FS1 (2013–2015); Fox (2015–present)
- Release: September 8, 2013 – present

Related
- Fox NFL Sunday

Fox NFL Kickoff is an American sports television program that originally debuted on FS1 on September 8, 2013 and moved to Fox on September 13, 2015 and serves as the secondary pre-game show for the network's National Football League (NFL) game telecasts under the NFL on Fox brand.

The hour-long program – which airs Sunday mornings at 11:00 a.m. Eastern Time – focuses on news and analysis of the week's upcoming NFL games as well as interviews with NFL coaches and players, and live reports from sites for the network's game telecasts, serving as an extension of Fox's primary NFL pre-game show, Fox NFL Sunday, whose own analysts appear on certain segments seen on the program. An audio simulcast of the program airs on sister radio network Fox Sports Radio, which is distributed by Premiere Radio Networks.

== History ==
=== Early history on Fox Sports 1 ===
Fox NFL Kickoff logo used during the program's run on Fox Sports 1 from 2013 to 2015.

On August 12, 2013, Fox Sports announced that it would launch Fox NFL Kickoff as a supplementary pre-game show to the Fox broadcast network's NFL coverage on Sundays; the program premiered on September 8, 2013 – the inaugural Sunday of that year's NFL season – on Fox Sports 1, the division's national sports network that launched three weeks earlier on August 17.

For its first two seasons, the program was originally hosted by Joel Klatt; former NFL players Randy Moss, Brian Urlacher and Donovan McNabb served as analysts, providing previews and prognostications for the day's game slate and reviewing any games held earlier that week. Urlacher left the program shortly after it began its second season on September 16, 2014, following his decision to resign from his analyst role at Fox Sports; Former Chicago Bears and Miami Dolphins head coach Dave Wannstedt became an analyst shortly beforehand at the start of the second season. McNabb was placed on an indefinite suspension by the sports division on July 12, 2015, following his arrest on a DUI complaint. During years when Fox holds the broadcast rights to the Super Bowl, the program is retitled Fox Super Bowl Kickoff, running as a five-hour broadcast.

The program struggled in the ratings throughout its run on FS1, averaging under 100,000 viewers during the 2014 season, with its lowest viewership being recorded on the November 30 edition, which registered a paltry 28,000 viewers (far behind competing NFL pre-game shows, Sunday NFL Countdown on ESPN and NFL GameDay Morning on NFL Network).

=== Move to Fox ===
On July 20, 2015, Fox Sports announced that Fox NFL Kickoff would move to the main Fox network, beginning in the 2015 NFL season. Fox asked its owned-and-operated stations and affiliates to clear the 11:00 a.m. Eastern Time hour on Sundays to run the program (displacing infomercials, religious programming or the network's political discussion show Fox News Sunday that were carried in that timeslot on most Fox stations, and local weekend morning newscasts on select stations located in the Pacific and Mountain Time Zones, where Fox's NFL coverage begins earlier). Executives with the sports division cited the preference to provide a stronger lead-in for Fox NFL Sunday (despite its position as the highest-rated NFL pre-game show for its entire 21-year history to that point, with the show averaging 4.9 million viewers during the 2014 season, an increase of 2% from 2013) and by effect, result in higher initial ratings for the network’s early afternoon game telecasts. Fox executives stated that the show would continue to utilize talent separate from that used by the network's longer established pre-game program, Fox NFL Sunday, although personalities from that program would act as contributors. In some cases it also allows the network full control of up to twelve hours of programming on gameday Sunday (including primetime for doubleheader days), if an affiliate leads in Fox NFL Kickoff with the network's Sunday morning talk show, Fox News Sunday.

On August 12, the division announced that former ESPN personality Colin Cowherd would join Fox Sports; in addition to his radio show moving to Fox Sports Radio and Fox Sports 1, Cowherd serves as a studio analyst for Fox NFL Kickoff. On September 11, 2015, Charissa Thompson (who also acts as a moderator and segment host of Fox Sports 1's sports news program Fox Sports Live, and was an NFL sideline reporter for Fox in 2008 and 2014) was named as the new host of the program, replacing Klatt; the appointment reunited Thompson with Cowherd, with whom she previously co-hosted ESPN2's SportsNation from 2012 to 2013. Former NFL player Champ Bailey was added as an analyst, with Cooper Manning added as a special contributor, conducting interviews and contributing to other special segments.

In part because of the relative lateness of the announcement, Fox stations in markets totaling about 10% of the U.S. (such as WFLD in Chicago, KTVU in San Francisco, KCPQ in Seattle, WVUE-DT in New Orleans, and WBFF in Baltimore) have declined to air Fox NFL Kickoff since due to existing programming commitments, specifically those to locally produced pre-game shows for local NFL franchises (either "official" team-produced or unofficial productions) that have led into Fox NFL Sunday prior to the move of Kickoff to Fox or to fulfill educational and informational programming requirements, or moved it to a secondary subchannel, as WITI in Milwaukee did, moving it to their Antenna TV subchannel. Similar to such agreements involving the network's former children's programming blocks, Fox contracted the local rights to the program to air on an affiliate of The CW or MyNetworkTV – typically one co-owned or co-operated with the local Fox station – in areas where a Fox owned-and-operated station or affiliate chose not to carry it. WITI and KCPQ began to carry it in the 2020 season on their main channels after coming under direct Fox ownership.

However, in some markets, Fox NFL Kickoff does not air at all. This includes a number of fairly large markets such as Salt Lake City and New Orleans (the latter devoting its morning to Saints pre-game programming).

=== Fox stations not airing Fox NFL Kickoff (as of the 2026 season) ===
Market	Fox station	Station where Fox NFL Kickoff airs
Albuquerque-Santa Fe	KRQE-DT2	KASY-TV (MyNetworkTV)
Bakersfield	KBFX-CD	KBFX-CD2 (This TV)
Bend, OR	KFXO-CD	Unseen
Buffalo	WUTV	WNYO-TV (MyNetworkTV)
Chicago	WFLD	WPWR-TV (MyNetworkTV)
Chico-Redding	KCVU	KRVU-LD & KZVU-LD (MyNetworkTV)
Cleveland	WJW	WBNX-TV (The CW)
Eureka	KBVU	KECA-LD2 (MyNetworkTV)
Fresno-Visalia	KMPH-TV	KFRE-TV (The CW)
Grand Rapids-Kalamazoo-Battle Creek	WXMI	WXMI-DT2 (Antenna TV)
Indianapolis	WXIN	WTTV-DT2/WTTK-DT2 (Independent)
La Crosse-Eau Claire	WLAX & WEUX	Unseen
Las Vegas	KVVU-TV	KVVU-DT2 (local weather)
Medford-Klamath Falls	KMVU-DT	KFBI-LD (MyNetworkTV)
Minneapolis-St. Paul	KMSP-TV	WFTC (MyNetworkTV)
Minot-Bismarck-Dickinson (Williston)	KMOT-DT2/KFYR-DT2/KQCD-DT2/KUMV-DT2	Unseen
New Orleans	WVUE-DT	Unseen
Omaha	KPTM	KPTM-DT3 (The CW)
Paducah-Cape Girardeau-Harrisburg	KBSI	WDKA (MyNetworkTV)
Palm Springs	KDFX-CD	Unseen
Portland, OR	KPTV	KPDX (MyNetworkTV) & KRCW-DT2 (Antenna TV)
Providence-New Bedford	WNAC-TV	WNAC-DT2 (MyNetworkTV)
Raleigh-Durham (Fayetteville)	WRAZ	WRAZ-DT2 (MeTV)
Sacramento-Stockton-Modesto	KTXL	KTXL-DT2 (Antenna TV)
St. Louis	KTVI	KTVI-DT2 (Antenna TV)
Salt Lake City	KSTU	Unseen
San Diego	KSWB-TV	KSWB-DT2 (Antenna TV)
San Francisco-Oakland-San Jose	KTVU	KICU-TV (Independent)
Sioux City	KPTH	Unseen
Spokane	KAYU-TV	KAYU-DT2 (Antenna TV)
Wichita-Hutchinson	KSAS-TV	KSAS-DT2 (MyNetworkTV)

== On-air staff ==
=== Current on-air staff ===
- Charissa Thompson – studio host (2015–present)
- Charles Woodson – analyst (2021–present)
- Julian Edelman – analyst (2023–present)
- Colin Cowherd – co-host (2015–2020); contributor (2023–present)
- Cooper Manning – contributor (2015–present)
- Rob Gronkowski – analyst (2019; 2022–present)
- Chris Myers – postseason reporter/fill-in studio host (2013–present)

=== Former on-air staff ===
- Dave Wannstedt – analyst (2013–2022)
- Champ Bailey – analyst (2015)
- Tony Gonzalez – analyst (2017–2020)
- Joel Klatt – studio host (2013–2014)
- Donovan McNabb – analyst (2013–2014)
- Randy Moss – analyst (2013–2015)
- Charles Tillman – analyst (2016)
- Brian Urlacher – analyst (2013–2014)
- Sean Payton – analyst (2022)
- Michael Vick – analyst (2017–2024)
- Peter Schrager – analyst and insider (2018–2024)
