= Fox Sports Racing =

Motorsports television network

- Country: United States
- Broadcast area: Canada; Caribbean; Puerto Rico
- Headquarters: Charlotte, North Carolina

Programming
- Language: English
- Picture format: 720p (HDTV); 480i (SDTV/16:9 letterbox)

Ownership
- Owner: Fox Sports Media Group (Fox Corporation)
- Sister channels: Fox Sports 1 Fox Sports 2

History
- Launched: August 17, 2013
- Replaced: Speed

Links
- Website: www.foxsports.com/motor/fox-sports-racing

Fox Sports Racing is a motorsports-oriented cable network owned by the Fox Sports Media Group division of Fox Corporation. The network launched on August 17, 2013 as a replacement of the former cable network Speed for North American markets outside the United States, including Canada and the Caribbean.

The network primarily simulcasts racing events from Fox Sports 1 and Fox Sports 2, which would be otherwise unavailable to these international markets, with the remainder of its schedule filled with reruns of these events and Speed's previous reality series. The network retained the previous Speed branding until February 20, 2015.

== History ==
Prior to its replacement with the general sports network Fox Sports 1, the motorsports-oriented network Speed was also carried outside the United States, particularly in Canada. Shortly after its launch as Speedvision, the Canadian Radio-television and Telecommunications Commission (CRTC) added the network to its list of foreign cable networks approved for carriage on Canadian cable and satellite providers in 1997. Prior to August 2013, Canadian viewers saw a largely identical schedule as the U.S. channel, although some programming, particularly live Formula 1 events, were blacked out to protect TSN, which holds domestic broadcast rights to F1 events (under CRTC rules, foreign services must own Canadian broadcast rights to the content they air). However, this point became moot when Speed eventually lost F1 rights to NBC Sports for the 2013 season, as NBCSN was not carried in Canada.

In Canada, as well as the Caribbean and Puerto Rico, Speed was not replaced with Fox Sports 1; it is unlikely that Fox Sports 1 would ever be approved for carriage in Canada, as it would compete directly with existing domestic sports network chains, such as Sportsnet and TSN. In parallel with the launch of Fox Sports 1, the former domestic version of Speed was silently replaced by an international version of the network on August 17, 2013. Its lineup primarily consists of live and repeat broadcasts of racing events and other automotive-oriented programming from Fox Sports' cable networks, along with reruns of Speed's past programs.

In early 2014, several major Canadian service providers, including Rogers Cable and Bell Satellite TV began to drop Speed upon the expiration of their carriage contracts. Shaw later announced they would drop Speed from their cable and satellite services on April 1, 2015. Reports indicated that Fox had attempted to raise the channel's carriage fees significantly, despite the major reductions in original programming for international viewers, and Rogers suggested Fox was unwilling to allow Speed to be moved to a more specialized package in light of the programming and cost changes.

On February 19, 2015, Fox Sports announced that it would re-brand Speed's international feed as Fox Sports Racing on February 20, 2015 to coincide with the opening event of the 2015 NASCAR Camping World Truck Series season. Fox Sports president Eric Shanks explained that the re-branding was intended to "put the power and leverage of the Fox Sports brand behind our commitment to motorsports". Fox also announced that Rogers had reached a deal to restore the re-branded network to its lineup.

As of 2017, Fox Sports Racing is available in Canada via the following providers: Cogeco, Eastlink, Rogers Cable, Shaw BlueCurve TV, Vidéotron, Bell MTS and SaskTel.

On July 12, 2019, Bell Satellite TV & Bell Fibe TV added Fox Sports Racing back to their lineup.

In 2020, Shaw Direct Satellite TV restored the channel, bringing it back to the channel line-up.

Fubo TV also carries the channel.

== Programming ==
Live programming on Fox Sports Racing is simulcast mostly from Fox Sports 1 and Fox Sports 2, including NASCAR practice and qualifying sessions in the NASCAR Cup Series and Xfinity Series, the Craftsman Truck Series, NHRA drag racing, the ARCA Racing Series, and Grand Prix motorcycle racing. The network also airs the studio show NASCAR Race Hub. When it is not airing live or encore presentations of events, the remainder of the network's schedule consists primarily of Speed's previous reality and documentary programming; Fox Sports Racing does not otherwise originate any new programming of its own.

The channel has also occasionally carried non-motorsports programming, including skateboarding and snowboarding, and from 2017 to 2019, the Westminster Kennel Club Dog Show (which was also aired in Canada by National Geographic; it moved to Sportsnet in 2020). For a period prior to its cancellation, it also aired Fox Sports Live with Jay and Dan.

The network does not carry outside advertising (unlike its sister channels and predecessor) aside from commercials inserted by local providers: commercial breaks consist solely of promos for Fox Sports Racing programming and public service announcements.
