= PBA on Fox =

- Genre: Ten-pin bowling telecasts
- Presented by: Rob Stone; Randy Pedersen; Kimberly Pressler; Dave Ryan; Dave LaMont; John Fanta
- Country of origin: United States
- Original language: English

Production
- Camera setup: Multi-camera
- Running time: 90 to 180 minutes
- Production company: Fox Sports

Original release
- Network: Fox; Fox Sports 1
- Release: December 23, 2018 – May 24, 2025

PBA on Fox is the branding used for Professional Bowlers Association (PBA) broadcasts produced by Fox Sports and airing on the Fox broadcast network and Fox Sports 1 (FS1). On March 21, 2018, the PBA announced that Fox Sports signed a multi-year agreement to acquire the television rights to its events beginning in 2019 and running through at least 2022. Most events will be carried by FS1, but at least four events per season will air on the Fox broadcast network.

== Terms of the deal ==
On March 21, 2018, Fox Sports announced that it had acquired the television rights for the PBA Tour, replacing ESPN, with a commitment for 26 broadcasts on Fox Sports 1 and four on Fox beginning in 2019 (totaling 58 hours, in comparison to the 30 hours of coverage provided by ESPN linear channels in 2018). To launch its coverage, Fox broadcast an invitational event, the PBA Clash, on December 23, 2018. Fox will air four events per-season, including the CP3 PBA Celebrity Invitational (which aired on the afternoon prior to the Super Bowl). Fox and FS1 will air 14 final rounds live, as compared to the four live broadcasts aired on ESPN in 2018. Fox Sports will also assume the role of sponsorship sales for the tour. The PBA saw the deal as an effort to increase media exposure for the tour and its top players.

In a similar manner to Fox's recent acquisition of NHRA drag racing, there will be a focus on developing new on-air features and technology to improve viewer understanding of the intricacies of the sport, and additional shoulder content. One such feature is StrikeTrack, a graphic (based on technology from the company Kegel) that displays the trajectory, speed, and rotation (RPM) of the ball as it travels down the lane. Broadcasting & Cable considered this feature akin to the network's "FoxTrax" system, infamously used during its National Hockey League coverage.

Fox and the PBA have declared their first year partnership a success. Through the June 2 PBA Playoffs final round, viewership on Fox, FS1 and FS2 (including reruns) was 20,923,000. This is up 85 percent from the 11,327,000 total viewers for all PBA telecasts in 2018 (on ESPN and CBS Sports Network). The February 10 PBA Tournament of Champions finals, broadcast on Fox, has had the highest 2019 first-run audience at 1,132,000 viewers. The ten PBA Tour Playoffs broadcasts drew a total of 7,941,000 viewers on FS1, FS2 and Fox.

=== Tournament schedule ===
On August 28, 2018, the PBA announced that all events televised on Fox and FS1, except for the USBC Masters, will only be open to members of the association. The USBC Masters has traditionally allowed qualifying USBC members who may not be PBA members to participate, and will continue to do so. PBA Xtra Frame Tour, PBA Regional Tour and PBA50 Tour events will also continue to allow qualifying non-members to participate.

The 2019 PBA Tournament of Champions and PBA Players Championship majors were held in February. In order to include it in Fox's new contract, the PBA's World Series of Bowling X (which included three standard PBA title events and the PBA World Championship — the season's third major) was postponed for 2018 and moved to March 2019, with live finals broadcasts occurring in prime time across four consecutive nights. For the first three majors of 2019 and the PBA Indianapolis Open, Fox and the PBA offered a $1 million bonus for any player who rolls a 300 game in the televised title match. Of the PBA's 26 televised 300 games, only two came in the title match, and neither of these was in a major tournament.

==== PBA Tour Playoffs ====
The inaugural PBA Playoffs took place April 8–10 and June 1–2, 2019 at Bayside Bowl in Portland, Maine. The PBA has called it the "spotlight event" for its first year of television coverage on Fox Sports. The tournament had a total prize fund of $276,000 with a $100,000 first place prize. The first three “elimination” rounds were held April 8–10, with broadcasts of these events held on eight consecutive Monday nights (April 8 – May 27) on FS1. The final four then competed on live broadcasts held June 1–2 on Fox.

== Commentators ==
In August 2018, the PBA announced that Rob Stone would return to covering professional bowling events when TV coverage moved from ESPN to Fox Sports for the 2019 season. Stone would be rejoining Randy Pedersen with whom he partnered from 2007 to 2011 on ESPN. Pedersen also worked for Fox Sports Net for a brief time in 2000.

Dave LaMont and Dave Ryan have filled in on play-by-play for select broadcasts where Stone was on other assignments for Fox. Kimberly Pressler continues in her role as laneside reporter.

After being knocked out of the 2019 PBA Tour Playoffs in the second round, Kyle Troup provided analysis for the final four and championship finals live broadcasts (aired June 1 and 2 on Fox), along with Jason Belmonte and the regular PBA broadcast team of Rob Stone and Randy Pedersen.
