= Thoroughbred Racing on Fox Sports =

- Genre: Horse racing telecasts
- Country of origin: United States
- Original language: English

Production
- Camera setup: Multi-camera
- Running time: 120 minutes or until race ends
- Production company: Fox Sports

Original release
- Network: Fox
- Release: 1998 – 2000
- Network: Fox; Fox Sports 1 Fox Sports 2
- Release: 2014 – present

Thoroughbred Racing on Fox Sports is the de facto title for a series of horse races events whose broadcasts are produced by Fox Sports, for Fox, Fox Sports 1 and Fox Sports 2 television networks in the United States. The flagship program for the series is America's Day at the Races.

== History ==
=== 1998–2000 ===
Fox Sports first began covering thoroughbred racing in 1998 with a multi-year deal for the Santa Anita Derby. Fox Sports expanded its coverage in 1999 through a partnership with the National Thoroughbred Racing Association. Fox aired 11 races as part of the partnership, branded as NTRA Champions on Fox. The partnership did not return in 2001.

=== 2014–2020 ===
Fox Sports returned to horse racing in 2014 with a two-year agreement with The Jockey Club for up to 10 races on Fox Sports 1 and Fox Deportes.

In 2016, Fox Sports reached an agreement with the New York Racing Association (NYRA) for coverage of 40 summer races from Saratoga Race Course on Fox Sports 2. The races were branded as Saratoga Live. In 2017, the Fox Sports expanded its NYRA races to include races from Aqueduct Racetrack and Belmont Park, branded as Aqueduct Live and Belmont Park Live respectively.

In August 2017, the NYRA extended its summer agreement with Fox Sports through 2020. In November 2018, the NYRA and Fox Sports reached a new agreement that made Fox Sports the year-round television home for NYRA races from Saratoga and Belmont, featuring more than 600 hours of horse racing.

In 2019, the NYRA and Fox debuted America's Day at the Races, which has become their flagship horse racing show. Also in 2019, through its partnership with the NYRA, the Fox network began airing the Travers Stakes, its first horse race since NTRA Champions on Fox races in 2000. Also through its partnership with the NYRA, in 2020, Fox Sports 1 began airing the Saudi Cup.

=== 2021–present ===
In March 2021, Fox Sports and the NYRA announced an extension to their rights deal through 2030. As part of the agreement, Fox Sports will air 700 hours of coverage each year from Belmont Park and Saratoga Race Course. The Travers Stakes will continue to air on Fox. Fox also acquired a 25% stake in NYRA Bets. In 2022, Fox Sports reached an agreement with the NYRA for the rights to the Belmont Stakes, the third leg of the horse racing triple crown, through 2030.

Recently, the Fox broadcast network has broadcast more races. In 2022, Fox aired the Jim Dandy Stakes. In 2023, Fox aired the Wood Memorial Stakes and the Fourstardave Handicap. Since 2023, in July and August, Fox airs 6 straight weeks of races branded as Fox Saratoga Saturday. In 2025, the Fox broadcast network added additional non-Saturday coverage of the Belmont Derby on Friday, July 4, and the Jockey Club Gold Cup on Sunday, August 31.

In May 2024, Fox announced an expanded agreement with the NYRA to air races from Monmouth Park Racetrack. Fox Business was added to coverage for the first time in August 2025, due to scheduling conflicts on Fox's other networks.

In 2026, Fox siggned an agreement to air races from Keeneland Race Course. Shortly after, FanDuel TV announced its intention to wind down its operations by the end of the year. Iagreed a broadcasting agreement for the Del Mar Fairgrounds meets.

== See also ==
- List of Thoroughbred Racing on Fox Sports commentators
