= Dean Blandino =

American football executive and rules analyst

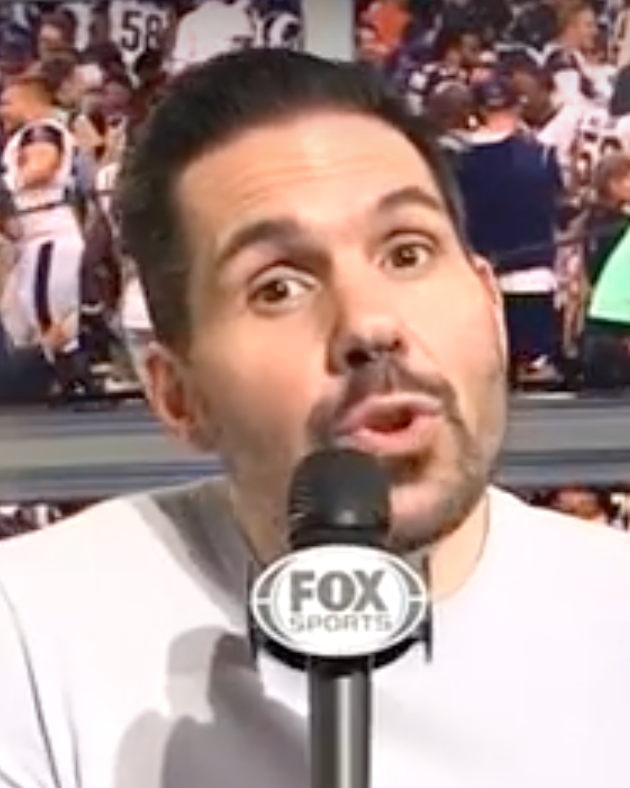
- Blandino in 2019
- Born: September 13, 1971 (age 54)
- Education: Hofstra University
- Occupations: UFL Head of Officiating; Fox Sports NFL Rules Analyst
- Known for: NFL Vice President of Officiating (2013–2017)

Dean Blandino (born September 13, 1971) is a rules analyst for Fox Sports. He also serves as the head of officiating for the UFL. He previously served as the NFL's Vice President of Officiating from 2013 to 2017.

== Biography ==
=== Early years ===
Blandino grew up in Bellmore, New York, where he played tight end on the high school football team at Wellington C. Mepham High School. He majored in communications at Hofstra University, graduating in 1993.

=== National Football League ===
Blandino was hired by Jerry Seeman, starting as an intern in the NFL's officiating department, and became a full-time employee after the 1994 season. Seeman assigned Blandino to organize instant replay when it was introduced in the NFL in 1999; Blandino managed the program for six years, and served as replay official for two Super Bowls. Blandino left the NFL in 2009, and started a business in California to train and evaluate replay officials.

Blandino returned to the NFL in 2012 as director of officiating, and in February 2013 was named Vice President of Officiating, succeeding Carl Johnson, who had held the position for three seasons as successor to Mike Pereira. In August 2014, Blandino was criticized for being seen on a "party bus" with Dallas Cowboys executives in a video released by TMZ. Blandino left the NFL in May 2017.

=== Post-NFL career ===
Blandino joined Fox Sports in June 2017 as a rules analyst for the network's NFL and college football coverage. In May 2018, Blandino took on an additional role, as director of instant replay for NCAA football; the role has an offseason focus, to allow him to continue broadcasting. Blandino was also an officiating consultant for the Alliance of American Football, and is a contributor to The Athletic. He was the executive producer of Her Turf, a 2018 documentary about three female football referees.

On January 6, 2020, Blandino was hired by the XFL to be the league’s head of officiating.

== Personal life ==
Blandino is divorced, with two children. At some point around 2005, he did stand-up comedy in several comedy clubs in New York City.
