= Michelle Yu =

American sportscaster

Michelle Yu (born in New York City, New York) is an American journalist who is a news anchor for NY1 News in New York City and the author of two novels.

== Education ==
Yu graduated from Manhattan College in 2001 with a degree in broadcast communications.

== Career ==
Yu began her career as a writer for The Journal News and Sports Illustrated for Kids.

In 2003 Yu joined College Sports Television. In 2009, she joined SportsNet New York as an anchor and reporter. In 2019, she joined NY1 News as a news anchor.

She is the co-author of two novels with Blossom Kan. China Dolls (2008) tells the story about the lives of three Asian American professional women in New York City and was described by The Bloomsbury Review as a "Chinese American installment of the Sex in the City genre." Young, Restless, and Broke (2010) relates the struggle of an actress in Los Angeles.

== Honors and awards ==
- 2016 New York Emmy Award, Societal Concerns:Program/Special

== Works ==
- China Dolls (2008)
- Young, Restless, and Broke (2010)

== Personal life ==
In 2014, she married Colombian financier Rafael Eduardo Romero while she was a sports anchor for SportsNet New York. They had first met at a tennis tournament in 2008 when she was first starting to work for SNY.
