= Jay Glazer =

American sports reporter (born 1969)

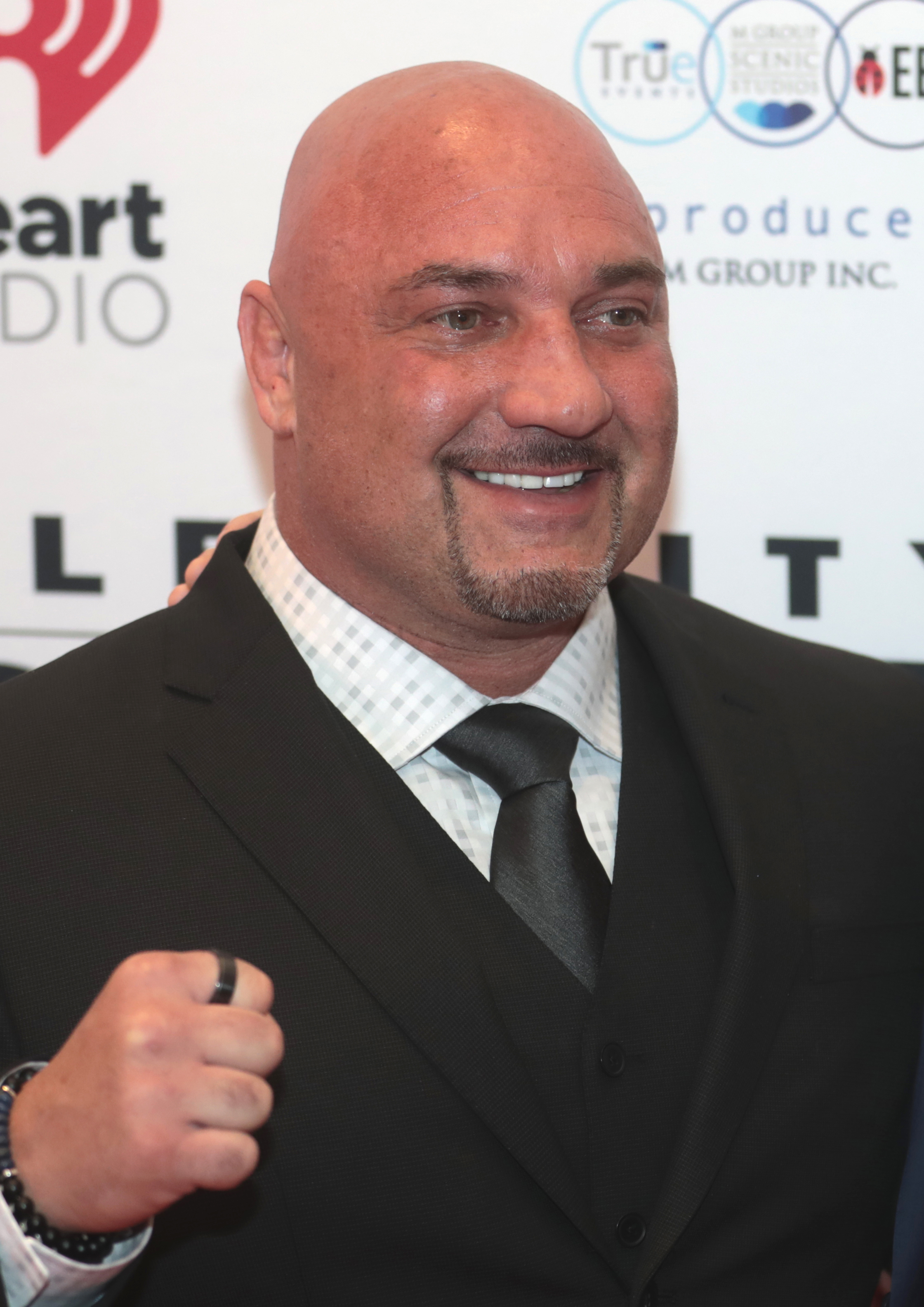
- Glazer at Celebrity Fight Night in 2019
- Born: Jason Charles Glazer; December 26, 1969 (age 56); Manalapan Township, New Jersey, U.S.
- Education: Pace University
- Occupations: Sports journalist, sports broadcaster
- Spouse: Rosie Tenison (m. 2024)

Jason Charles Glazer (born December 26, 1969) is a television personality and sports reporter. Since 2004, he has worked as a National Football League (NFL) insider for Fox Sports' NFL pregame studio show, FOX NFL Sunday, on which he reports exclusives, late-breaking updates, injury news, and other reports. The whole cast and their show were inducted into the TV Hall of Fame in 2019.

He was also part of FOX's Thursday Night Football television coverage. Glazer has been on multiple TV shows, including guest starring on all five seasons on HBO's Ballers and The League on FX. Glazer trains NFL players in mixed martial arts during the off-season.

In January 2018, it was announced that Glazer had joined Paramount Network and Bellator MMA to be part of their broadcast team after serving as host for the UFC for the previous five years. He was the first host of an MMA show in America when he hosted the Pride Fighting Championships in 2005.

== Career ==
In 2014, Glazer opened the Unbreakable Performance Center in West Hollywood with former Chicago Bears' all-pro linebacker, Brian Urlacher, and U.S. Women's Volleyball Captain, Lindsey Berg. The gym has become the home to many elite athletes, actors, musicians, and business people. Clientele have included Demi Lovato, Odell Beckham Jr., Chuck Liddell, Michael Strahan, Wiz Khalifa, Chris Pratt, and Sylvester Stallone.

Glazer and Nate Boyer in 2015 launched a non-profit 501(c)(3) charity named MVP (Merging Vets & Players), which works to match up former combat veterans and former professional athletes in order to help each other through the transition into their new lives away from the battlefields and playing fields.

Glazer also trains NFL players in mixed martial arts during the off-season with over 1,000 athletes having utilized his training program and been coached under his system.

In 2015, he hosted the season finale of Wicked Tuna for National Geographic.

Glazer was raised in Manalapan Township, New Jersey where he attended Manalapan High School. He went to college at Pace University, graduating with a degree in mass media. He then began his writing career as a columnist at the New York Post.

== Personal life ==
Glazer is Jewish and has a son.

== Acting appearances ==
- The Longest Yard (2005) – Sportswriter
- The Game Plan (2007) – Hack Pack
- Hell's Kitchen (2010) – as himself
- The League (2014) – as himself
- Ballers (2015) – as himself
- Bones (2017) – as Dave Hines
- Ridiculousness (2022) – as himself
