= Craig Shemon =

Craig Shemon is a radio personality with Beasley Broadcasting in Southwest Florida on 99.3 ESPN.

== Biography ==
Shemon has covered the Super Bowl, BCS National Championship Game, the NBA Finals, the PGA Championship, the Final Four, the NBA All-Star Game, the Daytona 500, the Indianapolis 500, the Shell Houston Open, and the American Century Golf Tournament at Lake Tahoe. For Yahoo! Sports Radio he was the host of The Arian Foster Show, Countdown to Kickoff, Around the NFL, and The Fantasy Freaks Show. In addition to Yahoo Sports Radio, he also served as a talk show host for Fox Sports Radio and has called play-by-play for NFL on Fox, NFL Europe on NFL Network, and college football and basketball for the Big Ten Network. Shemon was the voice of The Citadel Bulldogs football, basketball, and baseball teams. In addition to Yahoo! Sports Radio, Fox Sports Radio, The Citadel, The Military College of South Carolina, and FOX Sports, he has been an anchor on DirecTV's MLB Strikezone Channel and Foxsports.com's college football preview webcasts. Shemon was born in Detroit, attended and graduated from Indiana University Bloomington, is married with two kids, one dog, and resides in Florida.
