= Curt Menefee =

American sportscaster (born 1965)

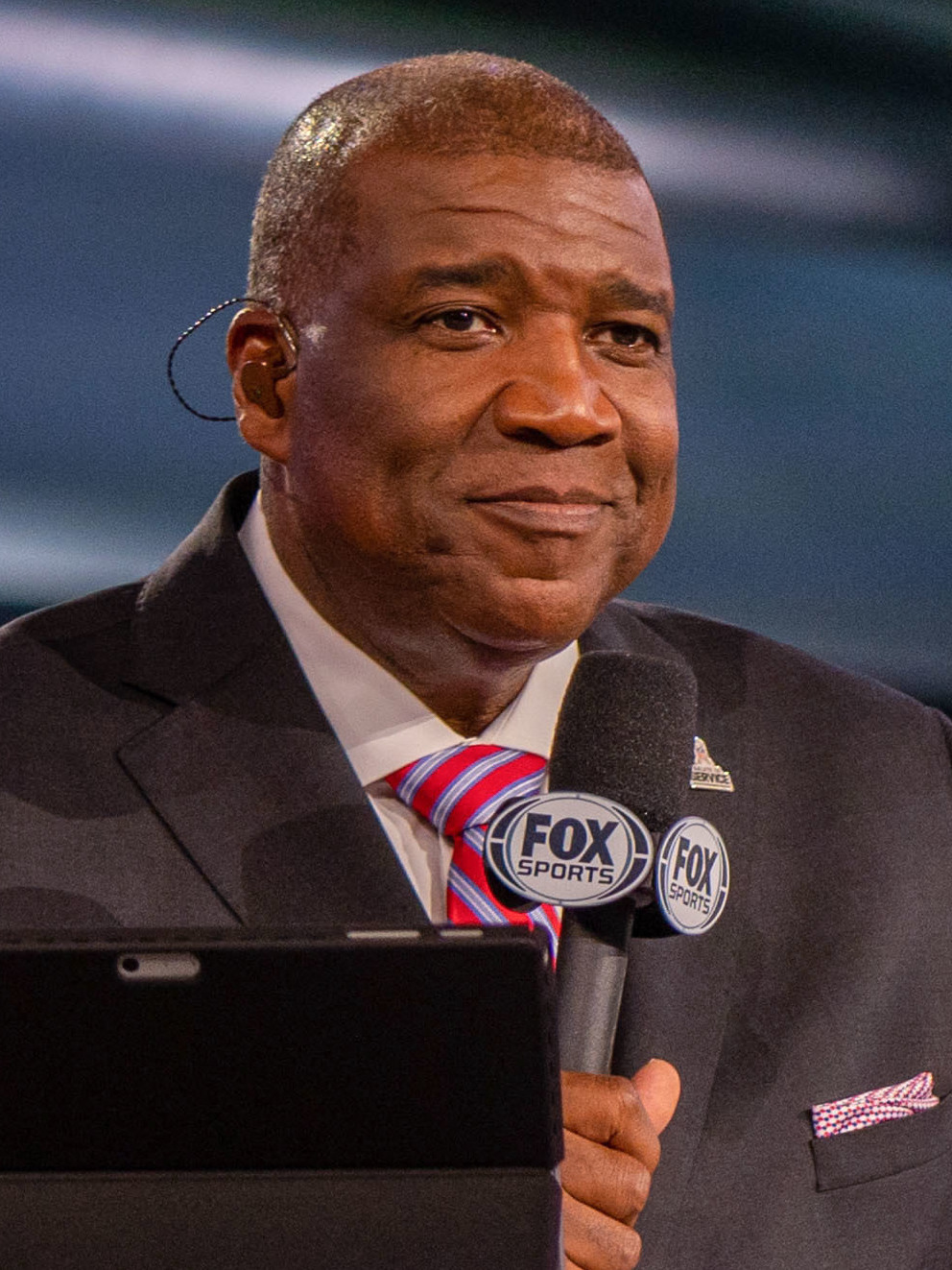
- Menefee in 2022
- Born: July 22, 1965 (age 61); Atlanta, Georgia, U.S.
- Education: Coe College (BA); Northwestern University (MA)
- Occupation: Sportscaster
- Known for: Host of Fox NFL Sunday

Curt Menefee (born July 22, 1965) is an American broadcaster who hosts the Fox Network's NFL pregame show Fox NFL Sunday.

== Early life and education ==
Menefee was born and raised in Atlanta, Georgia.

Menefee earned a Bachelor of Arts degree from Coe College in Cedar Rapids, Iowa. At Coe, he was a member of the Sigma Nu fraternity and inducted into the Sigma Nu Hall of Fame in 2016. He gave the commencement speech at Coe College in 2010 and was awarded an honorary doctorate in journalism. In 2021, Menefee was attending Northwestern University and enrolled in the university's master's in Public Policy & Administration program with plans to relocate to Chicago full-time.

== Career ==
While at Coe, Menefee worked at KCRG-TV in Cedar Rapids, and from 1987 to 1988, Menefee worked at WOI-TV in Ames, Iowa. He left Ames to work at WISC-TV in Madison, Wisconsin, departing that job for a position at Sports News Network in Arlington, Virginia. After that folded, Menefee became a weekend anchor at WTLV in Jacksonville, Florida, in 1991.

In 1992, Menefee was hired as the new sports director for KTVT, then an independent station, in Fort Worth, Texas. He added a radio show when KTCK "1310 The Ticket", an all-sports radio station, signed on in Dallas in 1994; Menefee hosted in the 9–11 a.m. slot. KTVT did not renew his contract in 1995, and he departed for WNYW, the Fox station in New York City.

=== Fox Sports ===
He began his career at Fox Sports in 1997 as a sideline reporter, then moved to play-by-play for Fox's NFL Europe and Fox NFL coverage on Fox Sports and FSN.

In 2007, Menefee became the host of Fox NFL Sunday.

On May 24, 2008, Menefee made an appearance on MLB on Fox. He held play-by-play duties alongside José Mota during a game between the Los Angeles Angels and the Chicago White Sox.

On May 22, 2010, Menefee hosted Fox's coverage of the UEFA Champions League Final between Inter Milan and Bayern Munich in the first broadcast of that tournament's championship game on over-the-air broadcast television in the United States.

On November 12, 2011, Menefee became the host of the UFC on Fox with Randy Couture and Jon Jones. He continued to serve as host until ESPN took the rights to broadcast UFC.

In 2015, he hosted the inaugural coverage of FOX Sports coverage of the U.S. Open Championship.

On February 8, 2020, Menefee called an XFL game between the LA Wildcats and the Houston Roughnecks.

In 2023, Menefee hosted Fox's inaugural coverage of the Belmont Stakes.

Beginning in 2022, Menefee and Joel Klatt have served as the head play by play and color commentator of the USFL on Fox and the UFL on Fox.

=== WNYW ===
On January 7, 2024, WNYW announced that Menefee would co-host Good Day New York starting on January 16, 2024. He would continue to host Fox NFL Sunday. On December 9, 2025, Menefee announced he would be leaving Good Day New York, citing issues pertaining to his commute between the Fox Television center and his home in California with his final day co-hosting on December 19.

=== NFL preseason football ===
Menefee called the NFL preseason for the Jaguars TV network from 2005 to 2007. He formerly called play-by-play for Seattle Seahawks preseason games from 2008 through the 2022 season, with Michael Robinson, Dave Wyman, and Matt Devlin doing color commentary on KCPQ and KZJO (replay).

=== Boxing ===
Menefee also provided ringside commentary for Top Rank's coverage of the Pacquiao-Hatton fight. He was also the play-by-play announcer for Showtime Championship Boxing. On January 7, 2012, Menefee announced he was leaving ShoBox.
