= Mike Pereira =

American football official (born 1950)

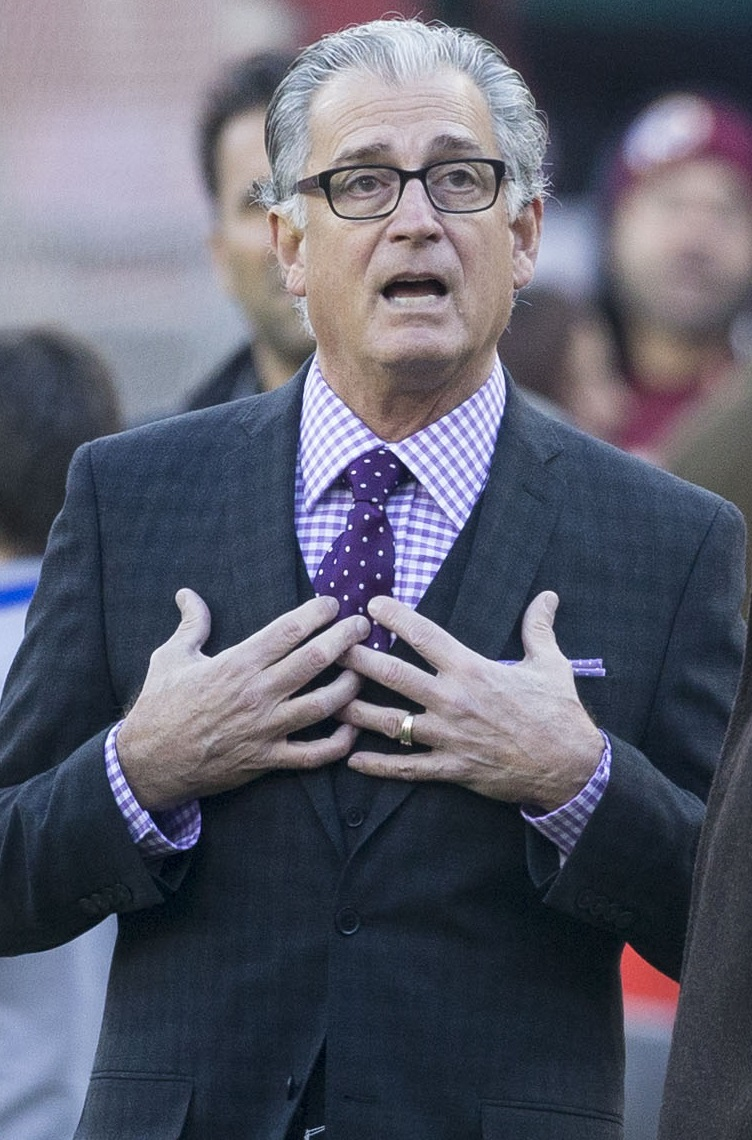
- Pereira in 2016
- Born: April 13, 1950 (age 76); Stockton, California, U.S.
- Occupations: NFL official (1996–2010); USFL/UFL official (2022–present)

Mike Pereira (born April 13, 1950) is a former American football official and later vice president of officiating for the National Football League (NFL) and currently the head of officiating for the United Football League (UFL). Since 2010, he has served as a rules analyst for Fox Sports, for which he has gained the nickname "Mikey Rule Books".

== Officiating career ==
Before working in the NFL, Pereira spent 14 years officiating college football games, with nine years in the Big West Conference (1982–90) followed by five years in the Western Athletic Conference (1991–95). Pereira moved up to the NFL for two seasons (1996 and 1997) as a side judge on the officiating crew headed by referee Mike Carey. He wore uniform number 77, later worn by three-time Super Bowl referee Terry McAulay, and now worn by Terry Killens. While working for the NFL, Pereira served as supervisor of officials for the Western Athletic Conference.

In 1998, Pereira was promoted to NFL supervisor of officiating. In 2001 Pereira became Director of Officiating for the NFL, succeeding Jerry Seeman, and then was promoted to Vice President of Officiating in 2004. Pereira retired from the NFL after the 2009 season.

From February to June 2011, Pereira was the Pac-10's interim coordinator of officiating, charged with implementing changes in the conference's officiating program. His successor, Tony Corrente, retained Pereira on his staff as a consultant through the Pac-12's 2011–12 football season.

Pereira was an officiating consultant for the Alliance of American Football, which began play in February 2019 and ended in April of the same year.

Pereira is currently the VP of Officiating for the United Football League.

== Media career ==
As VP of Officiating, Pereira appeared on the NFL Network show NFL Total Access during the "Official Review" segment, to discuss key calls made during the previous week's games with host Rich Eisen every Wednesday during the season.

In June 2010, it was announced that Pereira would be joining Fox Sports to serve as a rules analyst for the network's college and NFL coverage. He began a column on FoxSports.com and started to provide commentary during Fox Sports football telecasts. During Week 1 of the 2010 NFL season, Pereira correctly predicted that referee Gene Steratore would rule what appeared to be a game-winning catch by Calvin Johnson as incomplete. "That was my first real time of being put on the spot", Pereira would later say. "I was worried to death that the referee was going to say it's a touchdown and I'd be out of a job in one week... It validated my role as to being able to go on and explain things so people could understand why a decision was made on the field. Then at that point on, I got more air time." Pereira is also a frequent guest on KNBR during football season.

In 2012, Sports Illustrated named Pereira as one of the NFL's most indispensable broadcasting talents, saying, "Viewers have longed for broadcasters to provide accurate explanations from the NFL rule book, and Pereira, thankfully, has taken the burden off ex-jocks and announcers". Michael Hiestand of USA Today wrote that "after Fox's groundbreaking move to put the ex-NFL vice president of officiating on-air, Pereira proved to be a candid voice — not a shill for the almighty NFL". However, Danny O'Neil of the Seattle Times wrote that "Pereira has assumed the role of the overzealous defense attorney ... his appearances generally conclude with him concluding that the referees have gotten it right yet again ... Analyst is the title that FOX hangs on Pereira, but advocate is more appropriate".

Pereira also sparked coverage by others in the media when he criticized the commentary of Monday Night Football announcer Jon Gruden, calling him out as a "blowhard ... who spouts off when he doesn't know what he's talking about". Pereira specifically felt that Gruden "butchered" the analysis of two defenseless receiver plays during the telecast of an Atlanta Falcons-New Orleans Saints game. However, Doug Farrar of Yahoo! Sports thought that Pereira should have instead taken the higher road, and Fox should "lay down the law to Pereira [and] needs to be told to put the agendas away".

Pereira's success led Fox in 2015 to adopt rules analysts for three other Fox properties—Andy Petree (NASCAR, replaced by Larry McReynolds in 2016), David Fay (golf), Joe Machnik and Christina Unkel (FIFA). Pereira's success also led other networks like CBS, NBC, TBS/TNT/truTV, ESPN/ABC, and Prime Video adding a rules analyst to their broadcasts: Gene Steratore (CBS/TNT), Russell Yurk and Jerry Bergman (ESPN/ABC) and Terry McAulay (NBC/Prime Video). Since June 2017, Pereira has been joined by Dean Blandino, who resigned as NFL senior vice president of officiating the month before, in the same role for Fox.

== Personal life ==
Pereira was born to Al and Lydia Pereira and grew up in Stockton, California along with his older sister Linda. Al was a head linesman with the Pacific Coast Athletic Association and Mike Pereira credits his father with teaching him football. He played baseball for Santa Clara University from 1970–72 and graduated with a degree in Finance. In his 30s, Pereira opened a golf equipment and athletic shoe store with his parents, though they had divorced each other by that time.

Pereira lives in Sacramento with his wife Gail. Mike and Gail became friends in 1988 through Mike's sister, Linda, who was friends with Gail from college (UC Davis). Pereira proposed to Gail in 1996, the day after his first preseason game as an NFL official. Pereira commutes to the Fox Sports studios in Los Angeles each weekend during the football season.

Pereira is heavily involved in Battlefields to Ballfields, a charitable organization dedicated to retiring or returning veterans that aspire to become sports referees.

Pereira is a two-time cancer survivor: in 1975, Pereira was diagnosed with testicular cancer and in 2007, he was diagnosed with colon cancer.

He is of Portuguese descent.
