= List of Los Angeles Kings broadcasters =

== Television ==
=== 2020s ===
Year	Channel	Play-by-play	Color commentator(s)	Rinkside reporter	Studio host	Studio analysts
2025–26	FanDuel Sports West or FanDuel Sports SoCal or KCAL-TV	John Kelly or Josh Schaefer	Jim Fox; Tony Granato; Ray Ferraro; Daryl Evans	Carrlyn Bathe	Patrick O'Neal	Jarret Stoll; Derek Armstrong; Blake Bolden
2024–25	FanDuel Sports West or FanDuel Sports SoCal or KCAL-TV	Nick Nickson	Jim Fox; Daryl Evans	Carrlyn Bathe	Patrick O'Neal	Jarret Stoll; Derek Armstrong; Blake Bolden
2023–24	Bally Sports West or Bally Sports SoCal or KCAL-TV	Nick Nickson	Jim Fox; Daryl Evans	Carrlyn Bathe	Patrick O'Neal	Jarret Stoll; Derek Armstrong
2022–23	Bally Sports West or Bally Sports SoCal or KCOP-TV	Alex Faust	Jim Fox	Carrlyn Bathe	Patrick O'Neal	Jarret Stoll; Derek Armstrong
2021–22	Bally Sports West or Bally Sports SoCal	Alex Faust	Jim Fox	Carrlyn Bathe	Patrick O'Neal	Daryl Evans; Jarret Stoll; Derek Armstrong
2020–21	Fox Sports West	Alex Faust	Jim Fox	Carrlyn Bathe	Patrick O'Neal	Daryl Evans; Jarret Stoll

=== 2010s ===
Year	Channel	Play-by-play	Color commentator(s)	Rinkside reporter	Studio host	Studio analysts
2019–20	Fox Sports West or KCOP-TV	Alex Faust	Jim Fox	Carrlyn Bathe (home); Jon Rosen (road)	Patrick O'Neal	Sean O'Donnell
2018–19	Fox Sports West	Alex Faust	Jim Fox	Carrlyn Bathe (home); Jon Rosen (road)	Patrick O'Neal	Sean O'Donnell
2017–18	Fox Sports West	Alex Faust	Jim Fox	Alex Curry (home); Jon Rosen (road)	Patrick O'Neal	Sean O'Donnell
2016–17	Fox Sports West	Bob Miller or Gary Thorne or Ralph Strangis or Chris Cuthbert or Jiggs McDonald	Jim Fox	Alex Curry (home); Jon Rosen (road)	Patrick O'Neal	Sean O'Donnell
2015–16	Fox Sports West	Bob Miller or Nick Nickson	Jim Fox	Alex Curry (home); Jon Rosen (road)	Patrick O'Neal	Sean O'Donnell
2014–15	Fox Sports West	Bob Miller	Jim Fox	Alex Curry (home); Jon Rosen (road)	Patrick O'Neal	Sean O'Donnell
2013–14	Fox Sports West	Bob Miller	Jim Fox	Alex Curry (home); Jon Rosen (road)	Patrick O'Neal	Daryl Evans or Sean O'Donnell
2012–13	Fox Sports West	Bob Miller	Jim Fox	Dan Moriarty or Alex Curry	Patrick O'Neal	Jim Fox, Daryl Evans, or Anson Carter
2011–12	Fox Sports West	Bob Miller	Jim Fox		Patrick O'Neal	Jim Fox
2010–11	Fox Sports West	Bob Miller	Jim Fox		Patrick O'Neal	

=== 2000s ===
Year	Channel	Play-by-play	Color commentator(s)	Rinkside reporter	Studio host	Studio analysts
2009–10	Fox Sports West	Bob Miller or Jim Fox or Nick Nickson	Jim Fox or Daryl Evans	Heidi Androl and Patrick O'Neal	Patrick O'Neal	Heidi Androl
2008–09	Fox Sports West	Bob Miller	Jim Fox	Heidi Androl	Patrick O'Neal	
2007–08	Fox Sports West	Bob Miller	Jim Fox		Patrick O'Neal	
2006–07	FSN West	Bob Miller	Jim Fox		Patrick O'Neal	Marty McSorley
2005–06	FSN West	Bob Miller	Jim Fox		Patrick O'Neal	
2003–04	FSN West	Bob Miller	Jim Fox		Van Earl Wright	Jim Fox
2002–03	Fox Sports West	Bob Miller	Jim Fox		Bill Macdonald	Jim Fox
2001–02	Fox Sports West	Bob Miller	Jim Fox		Bill Macdonald	Jim Fox
2000–01	Fox Sports West	Bob Miller	Jim Fox		Bill Macdonald	Jim Fox

=== 1990s ===
Year	Channel	Play-by-play	Color commentator(s)	Studio host	Studio analysts
1999–00	Fox Sports West	Bob Miller	Jim Fox	Bill Macdonald	Jim Fox
1998–99	Fox Sports West or KCAL-TV	Bob Miller	Jim Fox	Bill Macdonald	Jim Fox
1997–98	Fox Sports West or Fox Sports West 2	Bob Miller	Jim Fox	Bill Macdonald	Jim Fox
1996–97	Prime Ticket	Bob Miller	Jim Fox	Bill Macdonald	Jim Fox
1995–96	Prime Ticket	Bob Miller	Jim Fox	Bill Macdonald	Jim Fox
1994–95	Prime Ticket	Bob Miller	Jim Fox	Bill Macdonald	
1993–94	Prime Ticket or KTLA	Bob Miller	Jim Fox	Bill Macdonald	Billy Harris
1992–93	Prime Ticket or KTLA	Bob Miller	Jim Fox	Bob Miller	
1991–92	Prime Ticket or KTLA	Bob Miller	Jim Fox	Bob Miller	
1990–91	Prime Ticket	Bob Miller	Jim Fox	Bob Miller	

=== 1980s ===
Year	Channel	Play-by-play	Color commentators	Studio host
1989–90	Prime Ticket	Bob Miller	Nick Nickson	Randy Hahn
1988–89	Prime Ticket	Bob Miller	Nick Nickson	Rich Marotta
1987–88	Prime Ticket	Bob Miller	Nick Nickson	Rich Marotta
1986–87	Prime Ticket	Bob Miller	Nick Nickson	Rich Marotta
1985–86	Prime Ticket	Bob Miller	Nick Nickson	Rich Marotta
1984–85	KHJ-TV	Bob Miller	Nick Nickson	Chris Baker
1983–84	KHJ-TV	Bob Miller	Nick Nickson	
1982–83	KHJ-TV	Bob Miller	Nick Nickson	
1981–82	KHJ-TV	Bob Miller	Nick Nickson	
1980–81	KHJ-TV	Bob Miller	Pete Weber	

=== 1970s ===
Year	Channel	Play-by-play	Color commentators
1979–80	KHJ-TV	Bob Miller	Pete Weber
1978–79	KHJ-TV	Bob Miller	Pete Weber
1977–78	KTLA	Bob Miller	Rich Marotta
1976–77	KTLA	Bob Miller	Rich Marotta
1975–76	KTLA	Bob Miller	Dan Avey
1974–75	KTLA	Bob Miller	Dan Avey
1973–74	KTLA	Bob Miller	Jim Minnick or Dan Avey
1972–73	KTLA	Roy Storey	Dan Avey
1971–72	KTLA	Jiggs McDonald	Dan Avey
1970–71	KTLA	Jiggs McDonald	Gary Morrell

=== 1960s ===
Year	Channel	Play-by-play	Color commentators
1969–70	KTLA	Jiggs McDonald	Dan Avey
1968–69	KTLA	Jiggs McDonald	Ed Fitkin
1967–68	KTLA	Jiggs McDonald	Ed Fitkin

== Radio ==
=== 2020s ===
Year	Channel	Play-by-play	Color commentator(s)
2025–26	LA Kings Audio Network	Josh Schaefer or Jared Shafran	Daryl Evans
2024–25	LA Kings Audio Network	Nick Nickson or Josh Schaefer	Jim Fox; Daryl Evans or Nate Thompson
2023–24	LA Kings Audio Network	Nick Nickson	Jim Fox; Daryl Evans
2022–23	LA Kings Audio Network	Nick Nickson	Daryl Evans
2021–22	LA Kings Audio Network	Nick Nickson	Daryl Evans
2020–21	LA Kings Audio Network	Nick Nickson	Daryl Evans

=== 2010s ===
Year	Flagship station	Play-by-play	Color commentator(s)
2019-20	LA Kings Audio Network (No terrestrial radio flagship station); ESPN Deportes KWKW (Spanish Broadcast- 10 games only)	Nick Nickson	Daryl Evans
2018–19	KEIB	Nick Nickson	Daryl Evans
2017–18	KABC	Nick Nickson	Daryl Evans
2016–17	KABC	Nick Nickson	Daryl Evans
2015–16	KABC	Nick Nickson or Jon Rosen	Daryl Evans
2014–15	KABC	Nick Nickson	Daryl Evans
2013–14	KEIB	Nick Nickson	Daryl Evans
2012–13	KTLK	Nick Nickson	Daryl Evans
2011–12	KTLK	Nick Nickson	Daryl Evans
2010–11	KTLK	Nick Nickson	Daryl Evans

=== 2000s ===
Year	Flagship station	Play-by-play	Color commentator(s)
2009–10	KTLK	Nick Nickson or Daryl Evans	Daryl Evans or Rich Hammond or Mike Kalinowski
2008–09	KTLK	Nick Nickson	Daryl Evans
2007–08	KTLK	Nick Nickson	Daryl Evans
2006–07	KTLK	Nick Nickson	Daryl Evans
2005–06	KSPN	Nick Nickson	Daryl Evans
2003–04	KSPN	Nick Nickson	Daryl Evans
2002–03	KSPN	Nick Nickson	Daryl Evans
2001–02	KDIS	Nick Nickson	Daryl Evans
2000–01	KDIS	Nick Nickson	Daryl Evans

=== 1990s ===
Year	Flagship station	Play-by-play	Color commentator(s)
1999–00	KRLA	Nick Nickson	Daryl Evans
1998–99	KRLA	Nick Nickson	Cammi Granato
1997–98	XTRA	Nick Nickson	Mike Allison
1996–97	XTRA	Nick Nickson	Mike Allison
1995–96	XTRA	Nick Nickson	Mike Allison
1994–95	XTRA	Nick Nickson	Brian Engblom
1993–94	XTRA	Nick Nickson	Brian Engblom
1992–93	XTRA	Nick Nickson	Brian Engblom
1991–92	XTRA	Nick Nickson	Brian Engblom
1990–91	XTRA	Nick Nickson	Tom Laidlaw

=== 1980s ===
Year	Flagship station	Play-by-play	Color commentator(s)
1989–90	KGIL	Bob Miller	Nick Nickson
1988–89	KGIL	Bob Miller	Nick Nickson
1987–88	KGIL	Bob Miller	Nick Nickson
1986–87	KGIL	Bob Miller	Nick Nickson
1985–86	KGIL	Bob Miller	Nick Nickson
1984–85	KGIL	Bob Miller	Nick Nickson
1983–84	KWNK	Bob Miller	Nick Nickson
1982–83	KPRZ	Bob Miller	Nick Nickson
1981–82	KPRZ	Bob Miller	Nick Nickson
1980–81	KRLA	Bob Miller	Pete Weber

=== 1970s ===
Year	Flagship station	Play-by-play	Color commentator(s)
1979–80	KRLA	Bob Miller	Pete Weber
1978–79	KRLA	Bob Miller	Pete Weber
1977–78	KRLA	Bob Miller	Rich Marotta
1976–77	KRLA	Bob Miller	Rich Marotta
1975–76	KRLA	Bob Miller	Dan Avey
1974–75	KRLA	Bob Miller	Dan Avey
1973–74	KFI	Bob Miller	Jim Minnick or Dan Avey
1972–73	KFI	Roy Storey	Dan Avey
1971–72	KNX	Jiggs McDonald	Dan Avey
1970–71	KNX	Jiggs McDonald	Gary Morrell

=== 1960s ===
Year	Flagship station	Play-by-play	Color commentator(s)
1969–70	KNX	Jiggs McDonald	Dan Avey
1968–69	KNX	Jiggs McDonald	Ed Fitkin
1967–68	KNX	Jiggs McDonald	Ed Fitkin
