= List of Fox Sports announcers =

This is a list of commentators who currently work or have worked for Fox Sports.

== Major League Baseball ==
=== Play-by-Play ===
- Joe Davis
- Adam Amin
- Jason Benetti
- Kenny Albert
- Alex Faust
- Kevin Kugler
- Brandon Gaudin
- Aaron Goldsmith

=== Color Commentators ===
- John Smoltz
- A. J. Pierzynski
- Eric Karros
- Dontrelle Willis
- Tom Verducci
- Adam Wainwright

=== Field Reporters ===
- Ken Rosenthal
- Tom Verducci
- Tom Rinaldi

=== Studio Host ===
- Kevin Burkhardt
- Mike Hill (fill-in)
- Chris Myers (fill-in)
- Matt Vasgersian (fill-in)

=== Studio Analysts ===
- Mark Sweeney
- Dontrelle Willis
- Derek Jeter (All-Star Game and postseason only)
- David Ortiz (All-Star Game and postseason only)
- Alex Rodriguez (All-Star Game and postseason only)

=== Former ===
- Bob Brenly
- Bret Boone
- Joe Buck
- Eric Byrnes (2006, 2007 World Series Pre–Game Studio Analyst)
- Chip Caray (studio host from 1996 to 1998; play–by–play announcer from 1999 to 2000)
- Jim Deshaies
- Noah Eagle (fill-in studio host)
- Ray Fosse
- Tim McCarver
- Luis Gonzalez
- Rex Hudler
- Eric Karros (2007 World Series Pre–Game Studio Analyst)
- John Kruk
- Al Leiter
- Kenny Lofton (studio analyst for 2005 ALCS & NLCS)
- Steve Lyons (studio analyst from 1996 to 2000; game analyst from 2001 to 2006)
- Dan McLaughlin
- Keith Olbermann (studio host from 1999 to 2000)
- Patrick O'Neal (substitute studio host in August 2005; Zelasko was on maternity leave)
- Jim Palmer
- Lou Piniella
- Mel Proctor
- Frank Robinson
- John Rooney
- Daron Sutton
- Chris Welch
- Dave Winfield (studio analyst in 1996)
- Kevin Kennedy
- Jeanne Zelasko
- Mario Impemba
- Rod Allen
- Thom Brennaman
- Dave Henderson

== Fox Soccer ==
=== Current ===
- Kate Abdo
- Ben Andrews
- Glenn Davis
- JP Dellacamera
- Jenn Hildreth
- Francisco X. Rivera
- Rob Stone
- John Strong
- Jenny Taft

== NASCAR ==
=== Current ===
- Vince Welch 2015–2021
- Mike Joy
- Larry McReynolds
- Michael Waltrip
- Chris Myers
- Phil Parsons Truck Series races 2007–present
- Jamie Little 2015–present
- Shannon Spake 2017–present
- Regan Smith
- Jamie McMurray
- Clint Bowyer
- Kevin Harvick

=== Former ===
- Jeanne Zelasko (2001–06)
- Dick Berggren (2001–12)
- Jeff Hammond 2001–14)
- Matt Yocum (2001–2020)
- Krista Voda (2007–14)
- Steve Byrnes (2001-2015)
- Darrell Waltrip (2001-2019)
- Hermie Sadler (2011-2019)
- Jeff Gordon (2016–2022)

== National Football League ==
=== In–studio personalities ===
- James Brown (Studio host, 1994–2005)
- Terry Bradshaw (Analyst, 1994–present)
- Howie Long (Analyst, 1994–present)
- Jimmy Johnson (Analyst, 1994–95 & 2002–2024)
- Ronnie Lott (Analyst, 1996–97)
- Cris Collinsworth (Analyst, 1998–2001)
- Jimmy Kimmel (Prognostication, 1999–2002; joined by "Cousin Sal" Iacono in 2002)
- Frank Caliendo (Prognostication, 2003–12)
- Jim Cantore (Weather, 1999)
- Jillian Barberie (Weather, 2000–present)
- Joe Buck (Pre–game studio host, 2006)
- Curt Menefee (Studio Host, 2006–present)
- Michael Strahan (Analyst, 2008–present)
- Tony Gonzalez (Analyst, 2017-2020)
- Rob Gronkowski (Analyst, 2019; 2022–present)

=== In–game commentators ===
==== Top Broadcast Teams (2026 season) ====
- Kevin Burkhardt/Tom Brady/Erin Andrews/Tom Rinaldi (America’s Game of the Week)
- Joe Davis or Adam Amin/Greg Olsen/Pam Oliver
- Adam Amin or Chris Myers/Drew Brees/Kristina Pink
- Kenny Albert/Jonathan Vilma/Megan Olivi
- Kevin Kugler/Daryl Johnston/Allison Williams
- Chris Myers/Mark Schlereth/Jen Hale

==== Former announcers ====
- Troy Aikman (2002–21, "#1 team" analyst) 2002-21
- Marcus Allen
- Jill Arrington (sideline reporter)
- Doug Bell
- Ray Bentley
- Carter Blackburn
- Tim Brando
- Mike Breen
- Thom Brenneman
- Joe Buck (2002–21, "#1 team" announcer) 2002-21
- Steve Buckhantz
- Jim Burt
- Steve Byrnes
- Mark Carrier
- Scott Case
- Dwight Clark
- Eric Clemons
- Brian Custer
- Cris Collinsworth (2002–04, "#1 team" analyst 2002–04)
- Spero Dedes
- Terry Donahue
- Steve Doocy (sideline reporter)
- Noah Eagle
- Jason Garrett
- Jerry Glanville
- Jay Glazer (sideline reporter)
- Aaron Goldsmith
- Drew Goodman
- Scott Graham
- Tim Green
- Howard Griffith
- Nick Halling
- Dale Hellestrae
- Merril Hoge
- Greg Jennings
- Dan Jiggetts (sideline reporter)
- D. J. Johnson (sideline reporter)
- Gus Johnson
- Sean Jones
- John Jurkovic
- Paul Kennedy
- Erik Kramer
- Dave Krieg
- Jeff Lageman
- Dave Lapham
- Marv Levy
- Josh Lewin
- Ronnie Lott
- Bill Maas
- John Madden (1994–2001, "#1 team" analyst)
- Trevor Matich
- Matt Millen
- Dan Miller
- Anthony Muñoz
- Karl Nelson
- Neil O'Donnell
- Jesse Palmer
- Dave Pasch
- J. C. Pearson
- Andre Reed
- Bill Romanowski
- Chris Rose
- Sam Rosen
- Tim Ryan
- Mark Sanchez (2021-2025)
- Craig Shemon
- Billy Ray Smith
- Shannon Spake
- Butch Stearns (sideline reporter)
- Kelly Stouffer
- Pat Summerall (1994–2006, "#1 team" announcer 1994–2001)
- Aqib Talib
- Matt Vasgersian
- Dave Wannstedt (2004)
- Amy Van Dyken (sideline reporter)
- Jeanne Zelasko (sideline reporter)

== National Hockey League ==
=== Studio personnel ===
- James Brown
- Terry Crisp
- Suzy Kolber
- Dave Maloney

=== Play-by-play ===
- Kenny Albert
- Mike Emrick
- Pat Foley
- Randy Hahn
- Rick Jeanneret
- John Kelly
- Mike Lange
- Josh Lewin
- Jiggs McDonald
- Bob Miller
- Howie Rose
- Sam Rosen
- Dick Stockton
- Dave Strader

=== Color commentators ===
- Terry Crisp
- John Davidson
- Mike Eruzione
- Jim Fox
- Gary Green
- Brian Hayward
- Joe Micheletti
- Peter McNab
- Greg Millen
- Denis Potvin
- Daryl Reaugh
- Mickey Redmond
- Pete Stemkowski
- Craig Simpson
- Paul Steigerwald

== College football ==
=== Studio personnel ===
==== Studio Hosts ====
- Rob Stone (Big Noon Kickoff Host)
- Mike Hill (Secondary studio host)

==== Studio Analysts ====
- Matt Leinart (Big Noon Kickoff analyst)
- Brady Quinn (Big Noon Kickoff analyst)
- Urban Meyer (Big Noon Kickoff analyst)
- Mark Ingram II (Big Noon Kickoff analyst)
- Chris Petersen (secondary studio analyst)
- Bruce Feldman (insider/secondary studio analyst)
- Charles Woodson (occasional appearances)
- Clay Travis (contributor)

=== Broadcasters ===
==== Play–by–Play ====
- Gus Johnson (Lead Play by Play)
- Connor Onion
- Tim Brando
- Jack Kizer
- Dan Hellie
- Eric Collins
- Noah Reed
- Carlo Jimenez

==== Color commentators ====
- Joel Klatt (Lead)
- Spencer Tillman
- Robert Griffin III
- Devin Gardner
- Petros Papadakis
- Mark Helfrich
- Robert Smith

==== Sideline reporter ====
- Jenny Taft (Lead Sideline reporter)
- Alexa Landestoy
- Josh Sims

=== Pairings ===
2026

1. Gus Johnson/Joel Klatt/Jenny Taft (Fox Big Noon Saturday)
2. Connor Onion/Robert Griffin III/Alexa Landestoy (Fox/FS1)
3. Tim Brando/Devin Gardner/Josh Sims (Fox CFB Friday/FS1)
4. Jack Kizer/ Mark Helfrich (Fox/FS1)
5. Dan Hellie/Robert Smith (FS1)
6. Eric Collins/Spencer Tillman (FS1)
7. Noah Reed or Carlo Jimenez/Petros Papadakis (FS1)

2025

1. Gus Johnson/Joel Klatt/Jenny Taft (Fox Big Noon Saturday)
2. Jason Benetti/Robert Griffin III/Alexa Landestoy (Fox/FS1)
3. Tim Brando/Devin Gardner/Josh Sims (Fox/FS1)
4. Connor Onion/ Mark Helfrich (Fox/FS1)
5. Noah Reed/Robert Smith (FS1)
6. Eric Collins/Spencer Tillman (FS1)
7. Dan Hellie/Petros Papadakis (FS1)
8. Trent Rush/Will Blackmon (FS1)

2024

1. Gus Johnson/Joel Klatt/Jenny Taft (Fox Big Noon Saturday)
2. Jason Benetti/Brock Huard/Allison Williams (Fox/FS1)
3. Tim Brando/Devin Gardner/Josh Sims (Fox CFB Friday/FS1)
4. Connor Onion/Mark Helfrich (Fox/FS1)
5. Eric Collins/Spencer Tillman (FS1)
6. Alex Faust/Robert Smith (FS1)
7. Chris Myers or Dan Hellie/Petros Papadakis (FS1)

2023

1. Gus Johnson/Joel Klatt/Jenny Taft (Fox Big Noon Saturday)
2. Jason Benetti/Brock Huard/Allison Williams (Fox/FS1)
3. Tim Brando/Spencer Tillman/Josh Sims (Fox/FS1)
4. Jeff Levering or Mark Followill/Mark Helfrich (Fox/FS1)
5. Alex Faust/Petros Papadakis (FS1)
6. Eric Collins/Devin Gardner (FS1)

2022

1. Gus Johnson/Joel Klatt/Jenny Taft or Allison Williams or Tom Rinaldi (Fox Big Noon Saturday)
2. Jason Benetti/Brock Huard/Allison Williams or Bruce Feldman (Fox/FS1)
3. Tim Brando/Spencer Tillman (Fox/FS1)
4. Noah Eagle/Mark Helfrich (Fox/FS1)
5. Alex Faust or Jeff Levering or Dan Hellie/Petros Papadakis (FS1)
6. Eric Collins or Adam Alexander/Devin Gardner (FS1)
7. Guy Haberman/Charles Arbuckle or Will Blackmon (FS1)

2021

1. Gus Johnson/Joel Klatt/Jenny Taft (Fox Big Noon Saturday)
2. Joe Davis or Aaron Goldsmith/Brock Huard/Bruce Feldman (Fox/FS1)
3. Tim Brando/Spencer Tillman (Fox/FS1)
4. Aaron Goldsmith or Cory Provus or Chris Myers/Mark Helfrich (Fox/FS1)
5. Cory Provus or Dan Hellie or Jeff Levering/Robert Smith (Fox/FS1)
6. Alex Faust or Dan Hellie or Eric Collins/Petros Papadakis (Fox/FS1)
7. Eric Collins or Cory Provus or Adam Alexander/Devin Gardner (Fox/FS1)

2020

1. Gus Johnson/Joel Klatt/Jenny Taft (Fox Big Noon Saturday)
2. Tim Brando/Spencer Tillman (Fox/FS1)
3. Joe Davis/Brock Huard or Mark Helfrich (Fox/FS1)
4. Aaron Goldsmith/Brady Quinn or Mark Helfrich or Petros Papadakis (Fox/FS1)
5. Brian Custer or Kevin Fitzgerald/Robert Smith (Fox/FS1)
6. Alex Faust or Chris Myers/Petros Papadakis or Evan Moore (Fox/FS1)
7. Eric Collins/Ben Leber (FS1/FS2)
8. Guy Haberman/Charles Arbuckle (FS1/FS2)
9. Kevin Fitzgerald/Evan Moore or Sam Acho (FS1/FS2)

2019

1. Gus Johnson/Joel Klatt/Jenny Taft (Fox Big Noon Saturday)
2. Joe Davis or Brandon Gaudin/Brock Huard/Bruce Feldman (Fox/FS1)
3. Tim Brando/Spencer Tillman/Coley Harvey (Fox/FS1)
4. Brian Custer/Robert Smith/Sarah Kustock or Kevin Patterson (FS1/FSN)
5. Justin Kutcher or Cory Provus/Petros Papadakis and Shane Vereen (FS1/FSN)
6. John Strong or Dan Hellie/Evan Moore (FS1/FSN)
7. Chris Vosters or Eric Collins or Dan Hellie or Aaron Goldsmith/Ben Leber (FS1/FSN)
8. Mark Followill or Alex Faust or Eric Collins or Aaron Goldsmith/Jordan Palmer or Max Starks (FS1/FSN)

2018

1. Gus Johnson/Joel Klatt/Jenny Taft (Fox/FS1)
2. Tim Brando/Spencer Tillman/Holly Sonders (Fox/FS1)
3. Joe Davis or Aaron Goldsmith/Brady Quinn/Bruce Feldman (Fox/FS1)
4. Brian Custer or Eric Collins or Cory Provus/Ben Leber/Jen Hale (Fox/FS1)
5. Tim Brando/Spencer Tillman/Holly Sonders/J.P. Morosi (Fox/FS1)
6. Justin Kutcher or Chris Vosters/Petros Papadakis and DeMarco Murray/Holly Sonders or Jen Hale (FS1)
7. Eric Collins or Aaron Goldsmith or Chris Myers or Guy Haberman/Evan Moore/Jen Hale (FS1)
8. Sean Kelley or Chris Myers/James Laurinaitis or A.J. Hawk and Pat McAfee (FS1)
9. Kevin Fitzgerald/Eric Wood (FS1)
10. Mark Followill or Jeff Levering or Brandon Gaudin/Brian Baldinger/Lesley McCaslin or Sarah Kustock (FS1/FSN)
11. Brendan Burke/David Anderson or Gary Reasons/Christian Steckel (FS1/FSN)

2017

1. Gus Johnson/Joel Klatt/Jenny Taft (Fox/FS1)
2. Joe Davis or Aaron Goldsmith/Brady Quinn/Bruce Feldman or Jen Hale or Petros Papadakis (Fox/FS1)
3. Brian Custer or Chris Myers/Ben Leber/Jen Hale or Kristen Balboni (Fox/FS1)
4. Tim Brando/Spencer Tillman and Les Miles/Holly Sonders (Fox/FS1)
5. Justin Kutcher or Guy Haberman/Petros Papadakis and Mark Helfrich/Shane Bacon or Jen Hale (FS1)
6. Eric Collins or Aaron Goldsmith or Mark Followill or Justin Kutcher/Danny Kanell and A. J. Hawk (FS1)
7. Sean Kelley/Brian Baldinger (FS1)
8. Kevin Fitzgerald or Chris Myers/Evan Moore (FS1)
9. Mark Followill or Jeff Levering/Brian Baldinger/Lesley McCaslin (FSN)
10. Brendan Burke/David Anderson/Christian Steckel (FSN)
11. Ron Thulin/Gary Reasons (FSN)

2016

1. Gus Johnson/Joel Klatt/Shannon Spake (Fox/FS1)
2. Joe Davis/Brady Quinn/Jenny Taft or Bruce Feldman (Fox/FS1)
3. Tim Brando/Spencer Tillman/Bruce Feldman (Fox/FS1)
4. Justin Kutcher or Mark Followill or Brian Custer/Petros Papadakis and A. J. Hawk (FS1)
5. Aaron Goldsmith/Ben Leber (FS1)
6. Mark Followill/Brian Baldinger and Ben Leber/Lesley McCaslin (FSN)
7. Brendan Burke/Brian Baldinger/Christian Steckel (FSN)

== See also ==
- Fox Footy Channel
- Fox Sports Radio
