= List of NFL on Fox broadcasters =

This article is a list of every person who has served as an on-camera announcer for the NFL on Fox:

== List of current announcers ==
=== A ===
- Kenny Albert: play-by-play (1994–present)
- Erin Andrews: sideline reporter and Fox NFL Sunday feature reporter (2012–present); lead Sunday sideline reporter (2014–2020); Thursday Night Football co-lead sideline reporter (2018–2021); co-lead Sunday sideline reporter (2021–present)
- Adam Amin: play-by-play (2020–present)

=== B ===
- Dean Blandino: lead rules analyst (2017–present)
- Tom Brady: lead game analyst (2024–present)
- Terry Bradshaw: studio co-host (1994–present); TNF studio analyst (2018–2021); rotating analyst (2019–2021)
- Drew Brees: analyst (2025–present)
- Kevin Burkhardt: play-by-play (2013–present); #2 (2014–2021); lead play-by-play (2022–present)

=== C ===
- Eric Collins: fill-in play-by-play (2025-present)

=== D ===
- Joe Davis: rotating play-by-play (2015–2021), #2 play-by-play (2022–present)

=== E ===
- Julian Edelman: studio analyst (2023–present)

=== F ===
- Alex Faust: fill-in play-by-play (2023–present)

=== G ===
- Jay Glazer: Fox NFL insider (2007–present)/Thursday Night Football insider (2018); sideline reporter (2004–2006)
- Rob Gronkowski: studio analyst (2019 and 2022–present)
- Robert Griffin III: analyst (2025–present)

=== H ===
- Jen Hale: sideline reporter (2011–present)

=== J ===
- Daryl Johnston: analyst (2001–present; #2 2001–2013, 2020 and 2022–2023)

=== K ===
- Kevin Kugler: play-by-play (2020–present)

=== L ===
- Howie Long: studio analyst (1994–present)/Thursday Night Football studio analyst (2018–2021); rotating analyst (2019–2021)

=== M ===
- Curt Menefee: studio host (2007–present); part-time studio host (2006); play-by-play (1998–2005); part–time play-by-play (2006); New York sideline reporter (1997); NFL Network Special play-by-play (2018); Thursday Night Football studio host (2020–2021)
- Matt Millen: analyst (1994–2000, 2015–2017, 2019–present)
- Chris Myers: postseason sideline reporter, regular season play-by-play (2003, 2005–present); fill-in studio host (2002, 2020)

=== O ===
- Pam Oliver: sideline reporter (1995–present)
- Megan Olivi: sideline reporter (2018–present)
- Greg Olsen: analyst (2021–present; #2 2021, 2024–present; #1 analyst 2022–2023)

=== P ===
- Mike Pereira: studio rules analyst (2010–2022, 2024-present); Thursday Night Football rules analyst (2018–2021)
- Kristina Pink: sideline reporter (2012–present); TNF co-lead sideline reporter (2018–2021)

=== R ===
- Tom Rinaldi: co-lead sideline reporter (2021–present)

=== S ===
- Mark Schlereth: analyst (2017–present)
- Michael Strahan: studio analyst (2008–present); Thursday Night Football studio host (2018–2019); Thursday Night Football contributor (2020–2021)

=== T ===
- Charissa Thompson: Fox NFL Kickoff co-host (2014–present); sideline reporter (2007–2010); in-game highlights (2016–present)

=== V ===
- Jonathan Vilma: analyst (2020–present)

=== W ===
- Allison Williams: sideline reporter (2025–present)

=== 2026 broadcaster pairings ===
1. Kevin Burkhardt/Tom Brady/Erin Andrews/Tom Rinaldi/Dean Blandino
2. Joe Davis or Kenny Albert (weeks 4–7)/Greg Olsen/Pam Oliver
3. Adam Amin or Tim Brando (week 4)/Drew Brees/Kristina Pink
4. Kenny Albert or Chris Myers (weeks 4–7)/Jonathan Vilma/Megan Olivi or Jen Hale (weeks 2, 4, 6)
5. Kevin Kugler or Mark Followill (week 8)/Daryl Johnston/Allison Williams
6. Chris Myers or Eric Collins (week 5)/Mark Schlereth/Jen Hale or Megan Olivi (week 2)
7. Tim Brando/Matt Millen/Sarah Kustok

== Former ==
=== A ===
- Troy Aikman: analyst (2001–2021; #1 analyst, 2002–2021); Thursday Night Football main analyst (2018–2021)
- Marcus Allen: analyst (1994)
- Barry Alvarez: analyst (2006)
- Heidi Androl: sideline reporter (2012)
- LaVar Arrington: analyst (2021)

=== B ===
- Brian Baldinger: analyst (1998–2008)
- Ronde Barber: analyst (2013–2019)
- Jason Benetti: play-by-play and select NFL games for Westwood One (2022–2025)
- Brian Billick: analyst (2008–13)
- Carter Blackburn: play-by-play (2005)
- Tony Boselli: analyst (2006–08)
- Mike Breen: play-by-play (1994–96)
- Thom Brennaman: play-by-play (1994–97, 1999–2000, 2004–19)
- Tim Brewster: sideline reporter (2011)
- James Brown: studio host (1994–2005)
- Steve Byrnes: play-by-play (2006)
- Joe Buck: play-by-play (regional play-by-play 1994–95, 1997, 2001; #1 play-by-play, 2002–2021); studio host: (2006); Thursday Night Football main play-by-play (2018–2021)
- Steve Buckhantz: play-by-play (1994, 1998)
- Ray Bentley: play-by-play (1998-01), analyst (1997–1999)
- Doug Bell (sportscaster) play-by-play (1999-01)

=== C ===
- Scott Case: analyst (1996)
- Rich Cellini: sideline reporter (2003)
- Eric Clemons: play-by-play (1994–1997)
- Cris Collinsworth: studio analyst (1998–2001), analyst (2002–2004)
- Lindsay Czarniak: rotating sideline reporter (2019, 2022); full-time sideline reporter (2020–2021)
- Dwight Clark: analyst (2002)
- Mark Carrier: analyst (2002)

=== D ===
- Charles Davis: analyst (2006, 2009–2019)
- Spero Dedes: play-by-play (2004)
- Terry Donahue: analyst (2005–07)
- David Diehl: analyst (2014–2017)

=== E ===
- Noah Eagle: rotating play-by-play (2022)

=== G ===
- Jason Garrett: analyst (2004)
- Jerry Glanville: analyst (1994–98)
- Mike Goldberg: play-by-play (2014)
- Tony Gonzalez: studio analyst (2017–2020); TNF analyst (part-time 2018; full-time 2019–2020)
- Drew Goodman: play-by-play (2001–2002)
- Scott Graham: play-by-play (1999–2003)
- Tim Green: analyst (1994–2005)
- Trent Green: analyst (2009)
- Howard Griffith: analyst (2005)

=== H ===
- Kevin Harlan: play-by-play (1994–97)
- Tim Hasselbeck: analyst (2007)
- Dan Hellie: rotating play-by-play (2017–2020, 2022)
- Merril Hoge: analyst (1994)
- Torry Holt: analyst (2010)
- Dale Hellestrae: analyst (2003, 2005-2006)

=== J ===
- Greg Jennings: analyst (full time 2020; part-time 2018–2019)
- D. J. Johnson: sideline reporter (1999–2001); analyst (2001)
- Gus Johnson: rotating play-by-play (2011–2014, 2021)
- Jimmy Johnson: studio analyst (1994–1995 and 2002–2024)
- Sean Jones: analyst (2001–02)
- John Jurkovic: analyst (2001-02)

=== K ===
- Paul Kennedy: play-by-play (1997, 1999, 2001)
- Brian Kilmeade: New York sideline reporter (2003)
- Erik Kramer: analyst (2004–05)
- Dave Krieg: analyst (2001–02)
- Justin Kutcher: play-by-play (2013-18)

=== L ===
- Josh Lewin: play-by-play (1998-2000, 2006)
- John Lynch: analyst (2008–2016)
- Ronnie Lott: studio analyst (1996–97), analyst (1998)
- Dave Lapham: analyst (1999–2000)
- Jeff Lageman: analyst (1999–2001)
- James Lofton: analyst (2000)
- Marv Levy: analyst (2002)

=== M ===
- Bill Maas: analyst (1995–2006)
- John Madden: analyst (1994–2001)
- Dan McLaughlin: St. Louis sideline reporter (2005); play-by-play (2006)
- Donovan McNabb: analyst (2014)
- Jim L. Mora: analyst (2010–11)
- Kirk Morrison: analyst (2014–2015)
- Anthony Muñoz: analyst (1994–95)
- Trevor Matich: analyst (1997–98)
- Dan Miller (sportscaster) play-by-play (2000, 2002-04)

=== N ===
- Karl Nelson: analyst (1995)

=== O ===
- Laura Okmin: sideline reporter and Sideline Reporter for the NFL Playoffs on Westwood One (2006–2024)
- Patrick O'Neal: sideline reporter (2005); in-game highlights (2012)
- Neil O'Donnell: analyst (2006)

=== P ===
- Jesse Palmer: analyst (2005-06)
- Dave Pasch: play-by-play (2003)
- J. C. Pearson: analyst (2003–08)
- Ron Pitts: play-by-play (2002–12), analyst (1994–2000), sideline reporter (2001-02)

=== R ===
- Andre Reed: analyst (2003)
- Bill Romanowski: analyst (2003)
- Chris Rose: in-game highlights (2003, 2006, 2009), play-by-play (2007–2010)
- Sam Rosen: play-by-play (1997–2019)
- Tim Ryan: play-by-play (1998)
- Tim Ryan: analyst (2002–2013), sideline reporter (2001)

=== S ===
- Mark Sanchez: analyst (2021–2025)
- Jason Sehorn: analyst (2007)
- Peter Schrager: studio analyst (2016–2024)/Thursday Night Football insider (2019–2021) sideline reporter (2013–2019)
- Tony Siragusa: sideline reporter/analyst (2003–2015)
- Robert Smith: analyst (2018–2023)
- Shannon Spake: sideline reporter (2016–2024)
- Pat Summerall: play-by-play (1994–2001, 2002-2003, 2006–2007)
- Chris Spielman: analyst (2016–2020)
- Dick Stockton: play-by-play (1994–2020)
- Billy Ray Smith Jr.: analyst (2000)
- Kelly Stouffer: analyst (2003)

=== T ===
- Aqib Talib: analyst (2020–2021)
- Amber Theoharis: sideline reporter (2007)
- Ross Tucker: analyst (2009-10)
- Nischelle Turner: sideline reporter (2007–2010)

=== V ===
- Matt Vasgersian: play-by-play (2005–09)
- Krista Voda: sideline reporter (2006–2008, 2012–2013)

=== W ===
- Sara Walsh: sideline reporter (2018–2021)
- Dave Wannstedt: analyst (2004)
- Rod Woodson: analyst (2007)

=== Z ===
- Jeanne Zelasko: correspondent (2000); in-game highlights (2004)
