= NHL on Fox =

NHL hockey broadcast telecasts (1995–1999)

- The general NHL on Fox logo.
- Also known as: Fox NHL Saturday
- Genre: Live sports telecast
- Directed by: Sandy Grossman (Stanley Cup Final); Bob Levy (Stanley Cup Final studio show); Artie Kemper (NHL on Fox); Peter Bleckner (NHL on Fox); Michael Frank (NHL on Fox)
- Presented by: Various commentators
- Theme music composer: Scott Schreer
- Country of origin: United States
- Original language: English
- No. of seasons: 5

Production
- Executive producers: David Hill; Ed Goren
- Producers: Richard Zyontz (Stanley Cup Final); Nancy Bernstein (Stanley Cup Final studio show); Mike Burks (NHL on Fox); Peter Macheska (NHL on Fox); Rich Russo (NHL on Fox)
- Production locations: Various NHL arenas (game telecasts); Fox Network Center, Los Angeles (studio segments, pregame and postgame shows)
- Cinematography: Robert Lawton; Pete Chavelrus; David Geller; Don Cornelli; Al Mountford; Martin Miller; Andy Mitchell; James Lytle; Mark Stacey
- Editors: Andy Boyle; Mitch Fehr; David Millar; Thimmiah Snyder
- Camera setup: Multi-camera
- Running time: 210 minutes or until game ended (inc. adverts)
- Production company: Fox Sports

Original release
- Network: Fox; Fox Sports Networks
- Release: April 2, 1995 – June 17, 1999

Related
- NHL on ABC

The NHL on Fox (also known as Fox NHL) was a presentation of National Hockey League (NHL) on Fox from the 1994–1995 NHL season until the 1998–1999 NHL season. NHL games continued to air on the Fox Sports Networks in the form of regional game telecasts until the 2021 rebrand to Bally Sports. As of 2026, only four Fox stations airs hockey broadcasts.

== History ==
On the heels of its surprise acquisition of the television rights to the National Football League (NFL) in December 1993, Fox sought deals with other major sports leagues to expand its newly created sports division, opting to go after the rights to broadcast National Hockey League (NHL) games. CBS, which had just lost its NFL package (which primarily included the rights to regular season and playoff games from the National Football Conference) to Fox and had also lost its Major League Baseball and college football rights to other networks, was Fox's primary competitor for the NHL package, hoping to replace some of the sports programming it had lost to Fox.

Nevertheless, in a serious blow to CBS, Fox outbid CBS for the NHL package as well. On September 9, 1994, the NHL reached a five-year contract with Fox for the broadcast television rights to the league's games, beginning with the 1994–95 season. Fox paid $155 million ($31 million annually) to televise NHL regular season and postseason games, considerably less than the $1.58 billion Fox paid for the NFL television rights.

The NHL's initial deal with Fox was significant, as an American network television contract was long thought unattainable for the league during the presidency of John Ziegler. For 17 years after the 1975 Final were broadcast on NBC, there would be no national over-the-air network coverage of the NHL in the United States (except for the 1979 Challenge Cup and game six of the 1980 Stanley Cup Final on CBS, and NBC's coverage of the NHL All-Star Game from 1990 to 1994) and only spotty coverage on regional networks. This was because no network was willing to commit to carrying a large number of games, in turn providing low ratings for NHL telecasts. ABC would eventually resume the network broadcasting of regular NHL games (on a time buy basis through ESPN) for the 1992–93 season. This continued through the 1993–94 season before Fox took over for the next five seasons.

Fox inaugurated its NHL coverage on April 2, 1995, toward the end of the lockout-shortened 1994–95 regular season, with six games (between the New York Rangers and Philadelphia Flyers; St. Louis Blues and Detroit Red Wings; Boston Bruins and Washington Capitals; Chicago Blackhawks and Dallas Stars; Florida Panthers and Tampa Bay Lightning; and the San Jose Sharks and Mighty Ducks of Anaheim). Mike Emrick and John Davidson were the lead broadcast team, and Joe Micheletti served as the reporter for national game broadcasts on Fox, while regionally-distributed games were handled by a variety of announcers, in addition to the trio. For the first four years of the deal, James Brown hosted the show and Dave Maloney was the studio analyst from the Fox Network Center studios in Los Angeles. For the fifth and final season, Suzy Kolber served as the studio host and Terry Crisp served as the studio analyst. Occasionally, active NHL players such as Mike Modano would serve as guest analysts.

=== FoxTrax ===
Fox's NHL broadcasts are perhaps best remembered for its use of FoxTrax (colloquially called the "glow puck," "smart puck," or "super puck"), a specialized ice hockey puck designed for the network's NHL telecasts which featured internal electronics that allowed its position to be tracked. It was primarily used to visually highlight the puck on-screen and display a trail when the puck was moving rapidly. The FoxTrax puck, while considered to be generally popular according to Fox Sports, generated a great deal of controversy and criticism, especially in Canada, from longtime fans of the game, and was ridiculed by comedians on both sides of the border.

=== Stanley Cup playoff coverage ===
During the first two rounds of the playoffs, at least two games were aired each round and were distributed regionally, unless other series involving other scheduled games were already finished, in which case the telecast was broadcast nationally. Canadian viewers were upset over the apparent preference that the NHL had for Fox ahead of CBC Television in regards to the scheduling of playoff games; Montreal Gazette sports journalist Pat Hickey wrote that the schedule was "just another example of how the N.H.L. snubs its nose at the country that invented hockey and its fans."

=== All-Star Game, conference finals and Stanley Cup Final ===
For the All-Star Game, conference finals, and Stanley Cup Final, the games (which were national telecasts) were hosted from the arena. The 1996 and 1997 All-Star Games were televised in prime time.

==== Stanley Cup Final ====
Fox split coverage of the Stanley Cup Final with ESPN. Game 1 of the 1995 Stanley Cup Final was the first Final game shown on network television since 1980 and the first in prime time since 1973. Games 1, 5, and 7 were usually scheduled to be televised by Fox; and Games 2, 3, 4, and 6 were set to air on ESPN. However, from 1995 to 1998, the Final matches were all four game sweeps; the 1999 Final ended in six games. The consequence was that – except for 1995 when Fox did televise Game 4 – the decisive game was never shown on network television. The pattern of a non-clinching game airing on cable, and the next game (a clincher) airing on broadcast, did not occur again until 2014 (all because of Game 2 scheduled on the same day as the annual Belmont Stakes). Perhaps in recognition of this, Games 3–7 were always televised by ABC in the succeeding broadcast agreement between the NHL and ABC Sports/ESPN.

Game 4 of the 1995 Final was notable because not only did the New Jersey Devils win the Stanley Cup, but also the team's main television play-by-play announcer, Mike Emrick, announced it.

KTVU, the Fox affiliate in the San Francisco Bay Area, dropped Game 4 of the 1995 Stanley Cup Final (June 24) for a San Francisco Giants game. The game between the Giants and Florida Marlins in Miami had a long rain delay. This allowed KTVU to broadcast the hockey game after all. However, the baseball game finally started before the hockey game ended. KTVU got a lot of complaints, so they re-aired the end of the hockey game the following Saturday (July 1).

=== The end of NHL on Fox ===
Things ended badly between Fox and the league in 1999, when the NHL announced a new television deal with ESPN that also called for sister broadcast network ABC to become the new network television partner (as previously mentioned). Fox challenged that it had not been given a chance to match the network component of the deal, but ABC ultimately prevailed.

Fox placed a bid for NHL broadcast rights when they came up for renewal in 2011 but dropped out of the running as a result of a bidding war between NBCUniversal and ESPN. The bid made by NBCUniversal (which owns NBC, Versus and USA Network and, through its ownership of the Philadelphia Flyers, a stake in the league itself) was selected by the league, in a ten-year extension of its existing broadcast contract.

After Disney acquired the entertainment unit 21st Century Fox (excluding the main network and sports units) in 2019, it resold the regional Fox Sports Networks to Sinclair Broadcast Group, which maintained the rights on some NHL teams. In 2021, Sinclair rebranded the channels as Bally Sports.

In August 2019, Fox Sports SVP/sales Mark Evans told The Big Lead that Fox would be interested in pursuing NHL media rights when they became available.

In April 2021, Fox Sports was reportedly considered a front-runner to acquire the NHL's "B" package after ABC and ESPN acquired the "A" package from NBC; the rights would ultimately go to Turner Sports.

After the bankruptcy of Bally Sports in 2023, Bally Sports SoCal (the former Fox Sports Prime Ticket) lost the rights to the Anaheim Ducks broadcasts and its local games moved to the Fox-owned station, KCOP-TV, starting the 2024–25 season.

== Coverage overview ==
=== Regular season ===
Fox's logo for their regular season broadcasts.

Fox televised between 5 and 11 regionally distributed games on Saturday or Sunday afternoons during the regular season, where anywhere from 2 to 6 games ran concurrently. All times below are Eastern, please note that the 6pm ET games were aired on FOX stations on the West Coast only.

== Personnel ==
=== Play-by-play ===
- Kenny Albert
- Mike Emrick
- Pat Foley
- Randy Hahn
- Rick Jeanneret
- John Kelly
- Mike Lange
- Josh Lewin
- Jiggs McDonald
- Bob Miller
- Howie Rose
- Sam Rosen
- Dick Stockton
- Dave Strader

=== Color commentators ===
- Terry Crisp
- John Davidson
- Mike Eruzione
- Jim Fox
- Gary Green
- Brian Hayward
- Joe Micheletti
- Peter McNab
- Greg Millen
- Denis Potvin
- Daryl Reaugh
- Mickey Redmond
- Pete Stemkowski
- Craig Simpson
- Paul Steigerwald

=== Studio commentators ===
- James Brown – studio host (1994–1998)
- Sandra Neil - fill-in studio host/rinkside reporter (1996)
- Terry Crisp – color commentary/studio analyst (1998–1999)
- Suzy Kolber – studio host (1998–1999)
- Dave Maloney – studio analyst (1994–1998)

=== Reporters ===
- Joe Micheletti
- Sandra Neil
- Craig Simpson

== Ratings ==
=== Stanley Cup Final ===
Year	Teams	Games Carried	Rating
1995	New Jersey-Detroit	1, 4	3.4
1996	Colorado-Florida	1, 3	3.6
1997	Detroit-Philadelphia	1	4.0
1998	Detroit-Washington	1	3.3
1999	Dallas-Buffalo	1, 2, 5	3.4

Game 4 of the 1995 Stanley Cup Final drew a 4.7 rating and a 10 share. In the New York City market (on Fox owned-and-operated station WNYW), the game drew a 10.6 rating and 21 share; in Detroit (on Fox affiliate, now owned-and-operated station, WJBK), it drew a 14.1 rating and 26 share.

=== Regular season ===
Season	Number of Dates	Rating
1994–95	5	2.0
1995–96	6	2.1
1996–97	6	1.9
1997–98	11	1.4
1998–99	11	1.4

=== All-Star Game ===
Year	Rating
1995	No game due to lockout
1996	4.1
1997	2.8
1998	2.7
1999	2.2

== NHL coverage on other Fox-owned outlets ==
=== Fox owned-and-operated television stations ===
Team	Station	Years of broadcast rights
Anaheim Ducks	KCOP 13	2024–present
Dallas Stars	KDFI 27 (Note: Was an independent station at the time KDFI held Stars broadcast rights, now a MyNetworkTV owned-and-operated station.)	2000; 2024–present
Detroit Red Wings	WJBK 2	2024–present
Philadelphia Flyers	WTXF 29	1973–1985

==== Fox Sports Networks owned-and-operated affiliates ====
Network	Region served	NHL team rights	Notes
Fox Sports Arizona (Note: Formerly known as Prime Sports Arizona until 1996.)	Arizona; New Mexico; Utah southern Nevada	Arizona Coyotes	The network was later renamed as Bally Sports Arizona on March 31, 2021, before it was dissolved on October 21, 2023.
Fox Sports Carolinas (Note: Formerly part of Fox Sports South, became a sub-feed in 2008.)	North Carolina; South Carolina	Carolina Hurricanes	The network was later renamed as Bally Sports South and Bally Sports Southeast on March 31, 2021, before they were rebranded under the FanDuel Sports Network branding in the fall of 2024.
Fox Sports Detroit	Michigan (statewide) northwestern Ohio northeastern Indiana northeast Wisconsin	Detroit Red Wings	FSN Detroit produces a pre-game/post-game show titled Red Wings Live. Fox Sports Net Detroit acquired the local television rights to Red Wings games (as well as those from the Detroit Pistons and Detroit Tigers) from PASS Sports, which subsequently ceased operations in 1997. The network was later named as Bally Sports Detroit on March 31, 2021, before it was rebranded under the FanDuel Sports Network branding in the fall of 2024.
Fox Sports Florida (Note: Formerly known as SportsChannel Florida until 2000, and was the last FSN-acquired network acquired through the SportsChannel purchase to retire the name.)	Florida (statewide) southern Alabama southern Georgia	Florida Panthers	Shares broadcast rights to the Panthers with co-owned SunSports. The network was later renamed Bally Sports Florida on March 31, 2021, before it was rebranded under the FanDuel Sports Network branding in the fall of 2024.
Fox Sports Midwest (Note: Formerly known as Prime Sports Midwest until 1996.)	Missouri southern Illinois southern Indiana eastern Nebraska eastern Kansas western Kentucky northern Arkansas	St. Louis Blues	Fox Sports Midwest's telecasts of Blues games are also available on Fox Sports Kansas City. The networks were later renamed as Bally Sports Kansas City and Bally Sports Midwest on March 31, 2021, before they were rebranded under the FanDuel Sports Network branding in the fall of 2024.
Fox Sports North (Note: Originated as WCCO II in 1986, later known as Midwest Sports Channel from 1989 to 1996. Regional subfields exist for the Minnesota/Dakotas region, and portions of Wisconsin not part of the Minneapolis–St. Paul market. The Wisconsin feed (which originally operated as a separate Wisconsin Sports Network from 1996 to 1998, before being absorbed into the then Midwest Sports Channel) became a separate Fox Sports Wisconsin in April 2007.)	Minnesota; Wisconsin; Iowa; North Dakota; South Dakota	Minnesota Wild	The network was later renamed Bally Sports North on March 31, 2021, before it was rebranded under the FanDuel Sports Network branding in the fall of 2024.
Fox Sports Ohio (Note: Formerly known as SportsChannel Ohio until 1998. Separate subfields also exist for the Cincinnati and Cleveland markets.)	Ohio eastern Indiana; Kentucky northwestern Pennsylvania, southwestern New York	Columbus Blue Jackets	Fox Sports Ohio carries the NHL's Columbus Blue Jackets in southern Ohio, Kentucky, and eastern Indiana, while the NBA's Cleveland Cavaliers are carried in northern Ohio, northwestern Pennsylvania, and southwestern New York. The network was later renamed as Bally Sports Ohio on March 31, 2021, before it was rebranded under the FanDuel Sports Network branding in the fall of 2024.
Fox Sports Southwest (Note: Formerly known as Home Sports Entertainment from 1984 to 1994, and as Prime Sports Southwest until 1996.)	Texas northern Louisiana; New Mexico; Arkansas	Dallas Stars	Stars telecasts are sometimes broadcast on Fox Sports Oklahoma, a sub-feed of Fox Sports Southwest, whenever an Oklahoma City Thunder, Oklahoma Sooners or Oklahoma State Cowboys game telecast is not scheduled. The network was later renamed as Bally Sports Southwest on March 31, 2021, before it was rebranded under the FanDuel Sports Network branding in the fall of 2024.
Fox Sports Tennessee/Fox Sports Tennessee (Note: Formerly part of Fox Sports South, became a sub-feed in 2008.)	Tennessee northern Alabama	Nashville Predators	The networks were later renamed Bally Sports South and Bally Sports Southeast on March 31, 2021, before they were rebranded under the FanDuel Sports Network branding in the fall of 2024.
Fox Sports West and Prime Ticket (Note: Fox Sports West was formerly known as (the original) Prime Ticket from 1987 to 1993 and Prime Sports West until 1996; Fox Sports Prime Ticket was formerly known as FSN West 2 until 2007.)	Southern and Central California, southern Nevada, and Hawaii	Los Angeles Kings, Anaheim Ducks	The network was later renamed Bally Sports West on March 31, 2021, before it was rebranded under the FanDuel Sports Network branding in the fall of 2024.
Sun Sports (Note: Formerly known as Sunshine Network (originally serving as a Prime Network affiliate) until 2009; was acquired by Fox Sports Networks in 1996.)	Florida	Tampa Bay Lightning	The network changed its name to Fox Sports Sun on October 4, 2015, then Bally Sports Sun on March 31, 2021, and eventually rebranded the FanDuel Sports Network branding in the fall of 2024.
SportSouth/SportSouth (Note: Formerly known as Turner South from 1996 to October 13, 2006, when it adopted its current name following its sale by Time Warner's Turner Broadcasting System subsidiary to then Fox Sports Networks parent News Corporation (now 21st Century Fox).)	Georgia; Alabama; Mississippi; Tennessee; South Carolina; North Carolina	Nashville Predators	SportSouth and Fox Sports South previously held the regional television rights to Atlanta Thrashers games until the team's relocation to Winnipeg, Manitoba, Canada in 2011, when it became the Winnipeg Jets. The network was later renamed as Bally Sports South and Bally Sports Southeast on March 31, 2021, before they were rebranded under the FanDuel Sports Network branding in the fall of 2024.

===== Former regional rightsholders =====
Network	Region served	NHL team rights	Notes
FSN Bay Area (Note: Formerly known as Pacific Sports Network (PSN) until 1990, SportsChannel Bay Area until 1993, and SportsChannel Pacific until 1998.)	Northern and central California, northwestern Nevada and parts of southern Oregon.	San Jose Sharks	Cablevision sold its 60% interest in FSN Bay Area in April 2007 to Comcast, which relaunched the network as NBC Sports California on March 31, 2008 (the channel continued to carry select FSN programming until August 2012); Fox Sports retains a 25% ownership stake in the network.
FSN Chicago (Note: Originally known as Sportsvision Chicago from 1979 to 1984, Hawkvision/ONTV until 1987 and SportsChannel Chicago until 1998.)	Northern Illinois, northern Indiana, and eastern Iowa	Chicago Blackhawks	FSN Chicago lost the regional cable rights to the Blackhawks to NBC Sports Chicago; FSN Chicago ceased operations on June 23, 2006.
FSN New York (Note: Formerly SportsChannel New York from 1982 to 1998 and FSN New York from 1998 to March 10, 2008.)	New York, northern New Jersey, northeast Pennsylvania, southern Connecticut.	New Jersey Devils; New York Islanders	Now co-owned with MSG Network, which also broadcasts NHL games from the Buffalo Sabres and New York Rangers.

== Notes ==
Records
Preceded by ABC and NBC	NHL network broadcast partner in the United States; 1994–1999	Succeeded by ABC
