= Boxing on Fox =

- The logo for Fox's Premier Boxing Champions cards.
- Also known as: Fox; Saturday Night Fights; Oscar De La Hoya's Fight Night; FS1; Golden Boy Live! Toe-to-Toe Tuesdays; FX; FX Championship Boxing; SportsChannel / Prime / FSN; Pro Boxing Tour; Budwesier Championship Boxing; MSG Fight Night; Fight Night at the Forum; Sunday Night Fights; Fight Time on Fox; Best Damn Fight Night Period; Best Damn Boxing Championship Period
- Genre: Professional boxing bouts
- Presented by: Kenny Albert; Heidi Androl; Ray Flores; Joe Goossen; Larry Hazzard; Lennox Lewis; Ray Mancini; Chris Myers
- Country of origin: United States
- Original language: English

Production
- Camera setup: Multi-camera
- Running time: Various
- Production companies: Fox Sports; Premier Boxing Champions

Original release
- Network: Fox; Fox Sports 1 Fox Deportes
- Release: October 16, 1995 – October 15, 2022

Boxing on Fox refers to a series of boxing events produced by Fox Sports and televised by the Fox Broadcasting Company and Fox Sports 1.

== History ==
=== Saturday Night Fights (1995) ===
Fox's first foray into boxing aired on December 16, 1995 in prime time headlined by a bout between Mike Tyson and Buster Mathis Jr.

On September 14, Tyson promoter Don King would stun the boxing world by announcing that the Tyson–Mathis match would be broadcast for free on Fox. Three weeks before the fight, Tyson suffered a broken thumb, but did not announce it until November 1, three days before the fight. In a press conference at the MGM Grand, Tyson announced the cancellation of the fight because of the injury. Then, on November 22, it was announced that the bout had been moved to Atlantic City with a December 16 date in place and that Showtime would air the fight instead of Fox. Plans were changed after New Jersey gaming authorities ruled against having the fight in Atlantic City because Don King had been under suspension in New Jersey since 1994 because of legal troubles. On November 30, Philadelphia's CoreStates Spectrum was announced to host the fight with Fox regaining the rights to air it.

The opening match on the card involved Terry Norris and Paul Vaden. Also featured was Frankie Randall defending his World Boxing Association junior welterweight title against Juan Coggi.

Kevin Harlan provided blow-by-blow commentary, with Sean O'Grady and Bobby Czyz on analysis, and James Brown as the host. Meanwhile, Fox's then lead NFL color commentator, John Madden conducted a taped interview with Tyson. Madden's NFL on Fox broadcast partner, Pat Summerall was initially scheduled to call the card, but when it was pushed back from November 4 to December 16, his NFL duties interfered with him participating.

Fox received a 16.9 Nielsen overnight rating and 29 share for the December 16 broadcast, making it the highest-rated night in Fox's then brief history as a network.

=== Oscar De La Hoya's Fight Night (1998) ===
In March 1998, Fox teamed with Oscar De La Hoya for a three-fight card from Mashantucket, Connecticut in prime time. Since De La Hoya himself, was under contract to fight exclusively on HBO, he couldn't fight. Instead, the card featured Yory Boy Campas fighting Anthony Stephens in a junior middleweight title bout, Eric "Butterbean" Esch in a super heavyweight fight against Bill Eaton, and a six-round women's match between Lucia Rijker and Mary Ann Almager. The card aired directly against the 70th Academy Awards on ABC.

James Brown called the action with Gil Clancy on analysis and Sean O'Grady reporting. The telecast garnered Fox a 4.3 rating (5.9 million viewers).

=== Golden Boy Live! (2012-2015) ===
The March 20, 1998 event wouldn't be the last time that Fox would collaborate with Oscar De La Hoya. In April 2012, Fox reached a multi-year agreement with De La Hoya's Golden Boy Promotions. Under terms of the agreement Golden Boy Promotions would stage one event per month in the United States to be simulcast on Fox Deportes, Fox Sports' regional networks and Fuel TV.

One year later, Fox announced that they had reached a multi-media rights extension with Golden Boy Promotions. Under this particular agreement, Fox Sports retained exclusive domestic rights to 48 live two-hour events (featuring two or three fights per event). Fox Sports 1 scheduled 24 live events per year, with Fox Deportes airing all 48 events live. This was an increase from 36 in the previous deal. The 24 events on FS1 would all originate in the United States, and most were expected to run on Monday nights once the network launched later that August.

==== Commentators ====
- Dave Bontempo (blow-by-blow)
- Brian Custer (blow-by-blow)
- Beto Duran (blow-by-blow)
- Bernard Hopkins (color commentary)
- Mario Lopez (reporter)
- Paulie Malignaggi (color commentary)
- Alan Massengale (blow-by-blow)
- Rich Marotta (color commentary)
- Jessica Rosales (reporter)
- Jim Ross (blow-by-blow)

=== Premier Boxing Champions (2015-2022) ===
On August 4, 2015, Fox Sports 1 announced that it would air 21 PBC cards on Tuesday nights (Toe-to-Toe Tuesdays) on the network from September 8, 2015 through June 2016. The telecasts were also simulcast in Spanish by Fox Deportes. The announcement came following the end of a contract between Fox Sports and Golden Boy Promotions.

By 2018, most of PBC's broadcasting agreements lapsed. In September 2018, PBC reached a four-year deal with Fox Sports, covering a series of 10 "marquee" cards per-year on the Fox broadcast network, 12 per-year on FS1, as well as Fox-produced pay-per-view events. Unlike the previous time-buy arrangements, Fox is paying rights fees; The Ring reported that Fox was paying $60 million per-year. Prior to the announcement, PBC reached a long-term deal with Showtime, through 2021. Both Fox and Showtime also began producing pay-per-view events (contrary to PBC's previous aversion to them).

==== Commentators ====
- Kate Abdo (host)
- Shawn Porter (analyst)
- Kenny Albert (blow-by-blow)
- Heidi Androl (reporter)
- Ray Flores (blow-by-blow)
- Joe Goossen (color commentary)
- Jordan Hardy (reporter)
- Larry Hazzard (rules expert/unofficial scorer)
- Brian Kenny (blow-by-blow)
- Lennox Lewis (color commentary)
- Ray “Boom Boom” Mancini (color commentary)
- Chris Myers (blow-by-blow)
- Austin Trout (color commentary)
- Marcos Villegas (unofficial scorer)

Meanwhile, Fox Deportes tapped International Boxing Hall of Fame member and former four-division world champion Erik “El Terrible” Morales to work alongside Jaime Motta (blow-by-blow) and Jessi Losada.

== See also ==
- Celebrity Boxing
