= NHL on ABC =

American television show of ice hockey games

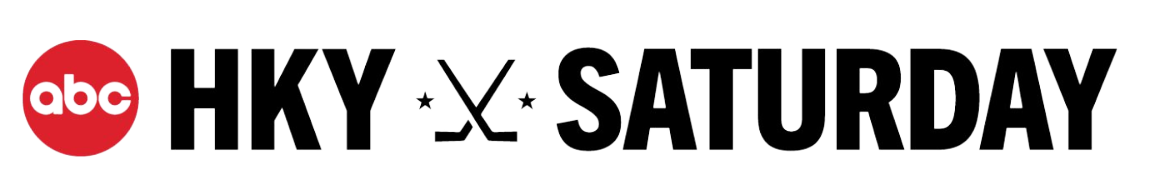
- Also known as: ABC Hockey Saturday; ABC Hockey Sunday
- Genre: Live sports telecast
- Presented by: Sean McDonough; Ray Ferraro; Emily Kaplan; Bob Wischusen; Erik Johnson; Stormy Buonantony; Mike Monaco; Kevin Weekes; Leah Hextall; Dave Jackson; Steve Levy; John Buccigross; Mark Messier; P. K. Subban
- Theme music composer: Bob Christianson
- Country of origin: United States
- Original language: English
- No. of seasons: 2 (1993–1994 version); 5 (2000–2004 version); 7 (2021 version); 14 (total)

Production
- Production locations: Various NHL arenas (game telecasts and some pregame, intermission segments and occasional postgame); ESPN's Bristol, CT studios (pregame, intermission segments and occasional postgame)
- Camera setup: Multi-camera
- Running time: 210 minutes or until game ends (inc. adverts)
- Production companies: ABC Sports (1993–1994 and 2000–2004); ESPN (2000–2004 and 2021–present)

Original release
- Network: ABC; ESPN+ (simulcasts, 2021–present); ESPN DTC (simulcasts, 2025–present); ESPNews (overflow during doubleheader weeks)
- Release: April 18, 1993 – May 1, 1994
- Release: February 6, 2000 – June 7, 2004
- Release: November 26, 2021 – present

Related
- NHL on ESPN/TNT; NHL on Sportsnet (Canadian rightsholders); NHL on Prime Video (Canadian rightsholders)

The NHL on ABC is a presentation of National Hockey League (NHL) games produced by ESPN and televised on ABC in the United States.

The network first broadcast NHL games during the 1993 Stanley Cup playoffs on April 18, 1993, under a two-year time-buy agreement with ESPN. After two years, the NHL left ABC for newcomer Fox, while remaining with ESPN.

As part of a joint contract with ESPN, which was reached right before the 1998–99 season, the NHL returned to ABC on February 6, 2000, with their coverage of the 2000 NHL All-Star Game in Toronto. Regular season game telecasts returned to ABC on March 18, 2000. ABC also gained the rights to select weekend games from each round of the Stanley Cup playoffs and the last five games of the Stanley Cup Final, including any if-needed ones. After the 2004 Stanley Cup Final, the NHL left ABC again, this time for NBC because Disney executives admitted that they overpaid for the 1999–2004 deal. ESPN, who was set to continue with the NHL, later dropped it from their schedules after the 2004–05 lockout.

On March 10, 2021, ESPN announced a new contract to hold half of the NHL's media rights beginning in the 2021–22 season. In this deal, ABC will broadcast up to 10 regular season games per season, primarily late-season games of the week (branded as ABC Hockey Saturday presented by Honda (formerly Expedia and Hotels.com) for sponsorship purposes), and the All-Star Game. ABC exclusively televises the Stanley Cup Final in even-numbered years. All games carried by ABC are streamed on ESPN+ and, since 2025, ESPN DTC.

Like other American national NHL broadcasts, games may be available in Canada on Sportsnet or streamed on Sportsnet+ as part of a 12-year agreement with the NHL that lasts to the end of the 2025–26 season (it was later extended another 12 years to 2037–38 season), subject to blackout restrictions.

== History ==
=== Before the 1992–93 NHL season ===
After being dropped by NBC after the 1974–75 season, the NHL had no national television contract in the United States. In response to this, the league put together a network of independent stations covering approximately 55% of the country.

Games typically aired on Monday nights (beginning at 8 p.m. Eastern Time) or Saturday afternoons. The package was offered to local stations without a rights fee. Profits would instead be derived from the advertising, which was about evenly split between the network and the local station. The Monday night games were often billed as "The NHL Game of the Week."

Initially, the Monday night package was marketed to ABC affiliates; the idea being that ABC carried NFL football games on Monday nights in the fall and (starting in May 1976) Major League Baseball games on Monday nights in the spring and summer, stations would want the hockey telecasts to create a year-round Monday night sports block; however, very few ABC stations chose to pick up the package.

In 1979, ABC was contracted to televise Game 7 of the Stanley Cup Final. Since the Final ended in five games, the contract was void. Had there been a seventh game, then Al Michaels would have called play-by-play alongside Bobby Clarke (color commentator). Jim McKay would host the seventh game in the studio and Frank Gifford (reporter) would have been in the winning team's dressing room to interview players and coaches as well as hand the phone to the winning team's coach that would have allowed him to talk to both President Jimmy Carter and Prime Minister Pierre Trudeau). This would give Michaels the honor of being the first to provide the play-by-play in four of the five major professional sports, having called the Super Bowl, the World Series, and NBA Finals. The game would have started at 4 p.m. Eastern Daylight Time on a Saturday, replacing Wide World of Sports and local news shows that typically followed it on ABC stations in the Eastern and Central time zones.

It was also around this time that ABC offered the NHL a limited deal (splitting the network and showing the NHL in the Northeast and Midwest and NASCAR in the South on Sunday afternoons) that NHL president John Ziegler Jr. quickly rejected.

==== ABC's coverage of the Winter Olympics ====
Even though ABC didn't yet televise National Hockey League games, they were the American network broadcast home of the Winter Olympic Games beginning in 1964 and continuing through the 1988 Winter Games in Calgary. For the ice hockey events, they employed Curt Gowdy for play-by-play duties during their 1968 and 1976 Winter Games broadcasts (NBC had the broadcasting rights for the 1972 Games in the interim). Gowdy worked with Brian Conacher for the 1976 ice hockey events.

Four years later, at the 1980 Winter Olympics in Lake Placid, ABC was on hand for a medal-round men's ice hockey game that would soon become known the "Miracle on Ice." On February 22, 1980, the United States team, made up of amateur and collegiate players and led by coach Herb Brooks, defeated the heavily-favored Soviet team, which consisted of veteran professional players with significant experience in international play. The rest of the United States (except those who watched the game live on Canadian television) had to wait to see the game, as ABC decided to broadcast the late-afternoon game on tape delay in prime time. Sportscaster Al Michaels, who was calling the game on ABC along with former Montreal Canadiens goalie Ken Dryden, picked up on the countdown in his broadcast and delivered his famous call:

Eleven seconds, you've got ten seconds, the countdown going on right now! Morrow, up to Silk. Five seconds left in the game. Do you believe in miracles? YES!

Al Michaels continued serving as ABC's lead play-by-play announcer for their ice hockey coverage for their next two Winter Olympics, both with lead color commentator Ken Dryden. For their coverage of the ice hockey events at the 1984 Winter Olympics in Sarajevo, Mike Eruzione (the captain of the gold medal-winning United States ice hockey team from 1980) worked with Don Chevrier. Four years later, for ABC's final Winter Olympics, Eruzione was this time paired with Jiggs McDonald.

==== ABC Radio coverage (1989–1991) ====
In 1989, the NHL signed a two-year contract (lasting through the 1990–91 season) with ABC Radio for the broadcast rights to the All-Star Game and Stanley Cup Final. ABC Radio named Don Chevrier and Phil Esposito as their main commentating crew.

=== Time-buy deal with ESPN (1993–1994) ===
The logo for ABC's regular season coverage in the 1993–94 season.

In the 1992–93 season, ABC televised five weekly playoff telecasts (the first three weeks were regional coverage of various games and two national games) on Sunday afternoons starting on April 18 and ending on May 16. This marked the first time that playoff National Hockey League games were broadcast on American network television since 1975 (when NBC was the NHL's American broadcast television partner).

In the 1993–94 season, ABC televised six weekly regional telecasts on the last three Sunday afternoons beginning on March 27, 1994, marking the first time that regular season National Hockey League games were broadcast on American network television since NBC did it in 1974–75. This marked the first time that regular season National Hockey League games were broadcast on American network television since 1974–75 (again when NBC was the NHL's American broadcast television partner). ABC then televised three weeks worth of playoff games on first three Sundays – the final game was Game 1 of the Eastern Conference semifinals between the Boston Bruins and the New Jersey Devils, a game that was aired nationally. The network did not televise the Stanley Cup Final, which instead, were televised nationally by ESPN and by Prime Ticket in Los Angeles (1993) and MSG Network in New York (1994). Games televised on ABC were not subject to blackout.

These broadcasts (just as was the case with the 2000–2004 package) were essentially, time-buys by ESPN. In other words, ABC would sell three-hour blocks of airtime to ESPN, who in return, would produce and distribute the telecasts. Overall, ABC averaged a 1.7 rating for those two seasons.

When the NHL television contract went up for negotiation in early 1994, Fox (which was in the process of launching its sports division after acquiring the rights to the National Football Conference of the NFL) and CBS (which was hoping to land a major sports contract to replace the NFL rights that they lost to Fox and Major League Baseball rights that they lost to ABC and NBC) competed heavily for the package. On September 9, 1994, the National Hockey League reached a five-year, US$155 million contract with Fox for the broadcast television rights to the league's games, beginning with the 1994–95 season.

=== NHL returns to ABC (2000–2004) ===
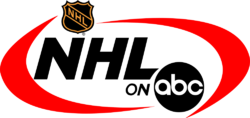
Previous logo used from 2000 to 2004.

In August 1998, ABC, ESPN, and ESPN2 signed a five-year television deal with the NHL, worth a total of approximately US$600 million (or $120 million per year), beginning with the league's 1999–2000 season. The $120 million per year that ABC and ESPN paid for rights dwarfed the $5.5 million that the NHL received from American national broadcasts in the 1991–92 season. ABC's terms of this deal included: rights to the NHL All-Star Game, 4 to 5 weeks of regular season action, with three games a week, weekend Stanley Cup playoff games, and Games 3 to 7 of the Stanley Cup Final.

As previously noted, much like ABC's initial contract with the NHL in the 1992–93 and 1993–94 seasons, ESPN essentially purchased time on ABC to air selected NHL games on the broadcast network. This was noted in copyright tags after the telecasts (i.e., "The preceding program has been paid for by ESPN, Inc."). ESPN later signed a similar television rights contract with the National Basketball Association in 2002, allowing it to produce and broadcast NBA games on ABC under a similar time buy arrangement on the broadcast network.

In May 2004, NBC and ESPN reached an agreement to broadcast NHL games beginning in the 2004–05 season, which would end up being canceled as a result of the 2004–05 NHL lockout; ESPN later withdrew from the deal in favor of OLN, which wound up being rebranded as NBCSN in 2012. In the interval between the 2004 Stanley Cup Final and the start of the 2005–06 season, several ABC affiliates, including WDTN in Dayton, Ohio (a secondary market for the Columbus Blue Jackets) and WAND in Springfield, Illinois (which is served by the Chicago Blackhawks and the St. Louis Blues), switched to NBC (in WDTN's case, they returned to the network after 24 years away).

=== Regular season ===
As previously mentioned, ABC televised four to five weeks' worth of regional games on Saturday afternoons, typically beginning in January or March for the first two seasons.

=== Second return to ABC (2021–present) ===
On March 10, 2021, ESPN announced a new, seven-year broadcast deal with the NHL, which included games on ESPN, ABC, and ESPN+ beginning in the 2021–22 season. At least 25 regular-season games will be scheduled to air on ESPN or ABC, along with half of the first two rounds of the Stanley Cup Playoffs, and one conference final each year. Not only does ESPN/ABC have the first choice of which conference final series to air, but also ABC will exclusively broadcast four Stanley Cup Final over the life of the contract, with the option to simulcast each game on ESPN+, as well as produce alternate broadcasts to air on other ESPN platforms.

The 2022 Stanley Cup Final marked the first to be broadcast in their entirety on over-the-air television since 1980, as the Final had since either been partially or exclusively carried on cable. Due to the current arrangement of ABC's sports programming being produced and co-branded by ESPN, the broadcasts carry the NHL on ESPN production and branding.

ABC's first game back featured the New York Rangers and the Boston Bruins in the annual Thanksgiving Showdown on November 26, 2021. After ABC aired the 2022 NHL All-Star Game, the network aired a weekly game under the ABC Hockey Saturday branding, which began on February 26. The package primarily aired on Saturday afternoons, with one primetime game on March 19 to accommodate afternoon coverage of the 2022 NCAA Division I women's basketball tournament. All games broadcast by ABC are simulcast on ESPN+.

ABC did not air a full 30-minute or hour-long pregame show before their games in 2021, instead opting for an abbreviated 15-minute pregame show presented by Verizon. However, ABC aired a full 30-minute pregame show on April 23, as a lead-out of their Bundesliga soccer coverage. They will air a 30-minute pregame show for games outside of the primetime slot (which airs for 20-minutes ). If time permits, ABC will also air a short postgame show until 6 or 11 p.m. ET respectfully, so most ABC affiliates on the East Coast can show their local news or ABC World News Tonight. For the Stanley Cup Final, all broadcasts began at 8 p.m. ET, allowing for a short pre-game show before puck drop; this is in contrast to the NBA Finals, which had historically preferred a later, 9 p.m. ET window for games on weeknights, with ABC leading into the game with half-hour Jimmy Kimmel Live! specials followed by NBA Countdown (from the 2023 Final and on, it will move weeknight games ahead by 30 minutes to an 8:30 p.m. window).

In the 2022–23 season, ABC aired 15 games, including four double-headers, the NHL Stadium Series game, and a triple-header on April 8; the Thanksgiving Showdown moved to TNT, which also covered this season's Stanley Cup Final.

For the 2023–24 season, ABC's coverage included 19 regular season games (the largest number of games on a broadcast network in NHL history), featuring four double-headers, both NHL Stadium Series games, and two triple-headers on February 17 and April 13. ABC also aired the 2024 Stanley Cup Final. ABC Hockey Saturday for this season began on January 13, preceding Super Wild Card Saturday of the NFL playoffs, unlike past years when its slate began after the NHL All-Star Game.

The 2024–25 season will again have ABC air 19 games. ABC's schedule will begin during the last week of the 2024 NFL regular season, with a game on Saturday, January 4 that will precede ABC/ESPN's NFL doubleheader, and another on January 5 that will directly compete with NFL afternoon games. This will mark the earliest date that a over-the-air broadcast network began airing its NHL schedule (outside of the All Star Game or holiday games). ABC will have another game on January 11 that precedes the Wild Card weekend of the NFL playoffs. There are also six Saturday doubleheaders from February though April, and two primetime games on March 22 and 29. However, ABC will not have any tripleheaders, and the 2025 Stadium Series will be on ESPN instead of ABC. With the NHL 4 Nations Face-Off tournament replacing the All-Star Game this season, the NHL decided to split it between TNT/truTV, ESPN, ABC, and ESPN+: TNT will have the Canada–Sweden game on February 12 and a Presidents' Day round-robin doubleheader on February 17, ABC/ESPN+ will air the February 15 round-robin doubleheader, and ESPN will air the United States–Finland game on February 13 and the final on February 20.

ABC aired 16 regular season games in the 2025–26 season, beginning during the final week of the 2025 NFL regular season on January 3 that preceded ABC/ESPN's NFL doubleheader. This included doubleheaders on January 31, February 28, March 7 and April 4, and a tripleheader on April 11. ABC also had one game on January 10 that preceded the Wild Card Weekend of the NFL playoffs, and two primetime games on March 21 and March 28. The 2026 Stanley Cup Final is slated to air on ABC. Like the previous season, the 2026 NHL Stadium Series would air on ESPN instead of ABC.

For the 2026–27 season, 16 regular season games were slated to air on ABC, beginning on January 16 preceding the NFL Wild Card games. A doubleheader on March 6 and three tripleheaders on February 20 (including the 2027 NHL Stadium Series), April 3, and April 10 were also scheduled. The NHL All-Star Game would make its return after a three-year absence.

== Personnel ==
=== Studio personalities ===
1. Steve Levy – lead studio host and alternate play-by-play (2021–present)
2. John Buccigross – alternate studio host (2021–present); alternate play-by-play (2024–present)
3. Arda Ocal – game break host (2023–present)
4. Mark Messier – lead studio analyst (2021–present)
5. P. K. Subban – lead studio analyst (2023–present); color commentator (2025-present; select games)
6. A. J. Mleczko – #3 color commentator (2021–present); alternate studio analyst (2021–present, select games)
7. Ray Ferraro – lead color commentator/ice-level analyst and alternate studio analyst (2021–present)

=== Play-by-play ===
1. Sean McDonough – lead play-by-play (2021–present)
2. Bob Wischusen – #2 play-by-play (2023–present)
3. Mike Monaco – #3 play-by-play (2023–present)
4. John Buccigross – alternate studio host (2021–present); alternate play-by-play (2024–present)
5. Steve Levy - lead studio host and alternate play-by-play (2021-present)

=== Color commentators/ice-level analysts ===
1. Ray Ferraro – lead color commentator/ice-level analyst and alternate studio analyst (2021–present)
2. Ryan Callahan – #2 color commentator (2024–present)
3. A. J. Mleczko – #3 color commentator/alternate studio analyst (2021–present, select games)
4. Kevin Weekes – rinkside reporter (2023–present; special events); color commentator (2024–present; select games)
5. P. K. Subban – lead studio analyst (2023–present); color commentator (2025-present; select games)

=== Rinkside reporters ===
1. Emily Kaplan – lead rinkside reporter (2022–present)
2. Leah Hextall – #2 rinkside reporter (2023–present)
3. Blake Bolden - #3 rinkside reporter (2024–present)
4. Kevin Weekes – rinkside reporter (2023–present; special events); color commentator (2024–present; select games)

=== Rules analyst ===
1. Dave Jackson – rules analyst (2021–present)

== Former personnel ==
=== 1992–1994 ===
==== Studio host ====
- John Saunders

==== Play-by-play ====
1. Gary Thorne
2. Mike Emrick
3. Al Michaels
4. Tom Mees (1994)
5. Bob Miller (1993–94)
6. Sam Rosen (1993–94)

==== Color commentators ====
1. Bill Clement
2. John Davidson
3. Darren Pang (1993–94)
4. Joe Micheletti (1993–94)
5. Jim Schoenfeld (1993)

==== Reporters ====
1. Al Morganti
2. Tom Mees
3. Bob Neumeier
4. Brenda Brenon
5. Mark Jones

=== 1999–2004 ===
==== Studio personalities ====
1. John Saunders – lead studio host
2. Steve Levy – fill-in studio host, #2 play-by-play man, NHL All-Star Game, and Stanley Cup Final reporter
3. John Davidson – lead studio analyst (1999–2002); color commentator (2003–2004)
4. Barry Melrose – color commentator, NHL All-Star Game, and Stanley Cup Final studio analyst (1999–2002); lead studio analyst (2003–04)
5. Darren Pang – Stanley Cup Final studio analyst (2003–2004)

==== Stanley Cup Final hosts ====
1. Al Michaels (2000–2002)
2. Chris Berman (2003)

==== Play-by play announcer ====
1. Gary Thorne
2. Steve Levy – fill-in studio host, #2 play-by-play man, NHL All-Star Game, and Stanley Cup Final reporter
3. Mike Emrick
4. Dave Strader (2000–2002)

==== Color commentators ====
1. Bill Clement - lead color commentator (1999–2004)
2. John Davidson – lead studio analyst (1999–2002); color commentator (2003–2004)
3. Darren Pang - color commentator (1999–2004)
4. Barry Melrose – color commentator, NHL All-Star Game, and Stanley Cup Final studio analyst (1999–2002); lead studio analyst (2003–04)
5. Brian Engblom (2002–04)
6. Brian Hayward (2000 Stanley Cup playoffs)
7. Jim Schoenfeld (2001–2002)

==== Reporters ====
1. Brian Engblom – co-lead rinkside reporter
2. Darren Pang – co-lead rinkside reporter
3. Steve Levy – fill-in studio host, #2 play-by-play man, NHL All-Star Game, and Stanley Cup Final reporter
4. Sam Ryan
5. Erin Andrews
6. Joe Micheletti
7. Christine Simpson (2001–2003)
8. Daryl Reaugh
9. Mickey Redmond (2001; Detroit Red Wings)
10. Tony Granato (2002 Stanley Cup playoffs)
11. Jack Edwards
12. Eddie Olczyk

=== 2021–present ===
- Brian Boucher – #2 color commentator and occasional studio analyst (2022–2023, select games)
- Chris Chelios – lead studio analyst (2021–2023)
- Laura Rutledge – contributor (2022)
- Marty Smith – contributor (2023)

== National Hockey League coverage on ABC owned-and-operated television stations ==
Team	Stations	Years
Philadelphia Flyers	WPVI-TV 6	1983–1986
San Jose Sharks	KGO-TV 7	1991–1994

Preceded by NBC	NHL network broadcast partner (with NBC) in the United States; 1992–1994	Succeeded by Fox
Preceded by Fox	NHL network broadcast partner in the United States; 2000–2004	Succeeded by NBC
Preceded by NBC	NHL network broadcast partner in the United States; 2021–	Succeeded by –
