= Prime Ticket =

Prime Ticket may refer to:

- ABTV, a regional sports network that was known as Prime Ticket from 1985 to 1995
- FanDuel Sports Network SoCal, a regional sports network that was known as Prime Ticket from 2006 to 2021
