= Dan Avey =

American radio personality (1941–2010)

Dan Avey (April 26, 1941 – August 15, 2010) was a radio personality and newscaster who worked for over 30 years in the Los Angeles area and received more than 30 major journalism awards including 15 Golden Mikes.

== Career ==
Avey started his radio career at KXLY in Spokane, Washington during his freshman year in college. From 1972 to 1976, he served as the analyst on Los Angeles Kings broadcasts, where he originally was paired with Jiggs McDonald, and later with Roy Storey and Bob Miller, who like Avey has a star on the Hollywood Walk of Fame.

In 1976, he started at all-news KFWB, and in 1978 he also had a short stint at KWIZ in Santa Ana. In 1986, he left KFWB when he was hired by KFI to join Gary Owens' new morning show. Avey later became the newsman for Geoff Edwards' midday talk show at KFI. When Edwards left the station in March 1989, Avey and two other people associated with the show were fired a few days later, and Avey returned to KFWB where he worked for the next twelve years.

In November 2001, KABC hired him to be paired with Ken Minyard in the morning. He continued on as KABC news anchor from noon to 6 p.m. during The Sean Hannity Show and the Larry Elder show.

Avey has also been a sports commentator for the Los Angeles Kings hockey team, and for 15 years has taught a sports broadcasting class at the University of Southern California.

For his work in radio, on his birthday, April 26, 2006, he received a star on the Hollywood Walk of Fame at 6834 Hollywood Blvd, in front of the El Capitan Theatre.

In late 2007, Avey left KABC.

== Personal life ==
Avey, a Vietnam green beret, also served as a coach for AYSO soccer, and a camp counselor for the Dream Street Foundation, which runs a summer camp for children with serious illnesses.

=== Death ===
Avey died from cancer at Cedars Sinai on August 15, 2010. He had been fighting the disease for five years, including during much of his stay at KABC.
