= Frank Bathe =

Canadian ice hockey player

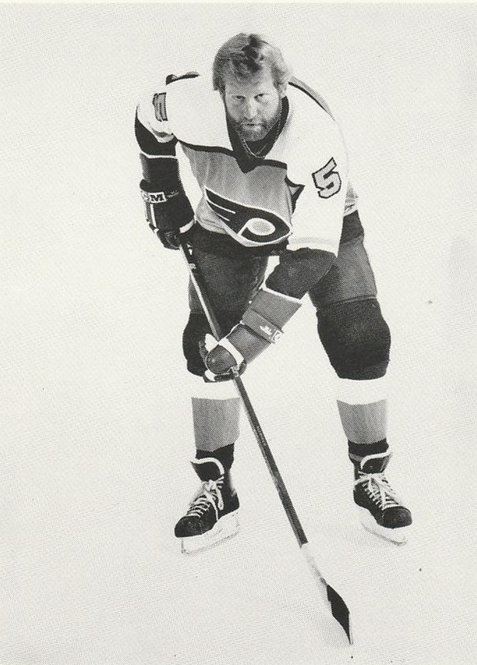
- Born: September 27, 1954 (age 71) Oshawa, Ontario, Canada
- Height: 6 ft 0 in (183 cm)
- Weight: 185 lb (84 kg; 13 st 3 lb)
- Position: Defence
- Shot: Left
- Played for: Detroit Red Wings; Philadelphia Flyers
- NHL draft: Undrafted
- Playing career: 1974–1984

Francis Leonard Bathe (born September 27, 1954) is a Canadian retired professional ice hockey defenceman who played nine seasons in the National Hockey League (NHL) with the Detroit Red Wings and Philadelphia Flyers.

== Playing career ==
The former Philadelphia Flyers defenceman is the son of Alan Bathe, who signed as a free agent with the Maple Leafs. Sporting a full beard and a head of shaggy red hair made him a true standout on the ice. He was known as a fighter. He won the Barry Ashbee Trophy for best Flyers defenceman in 1982. A back injury ended his NHL career in 1984.

Currently residing in southern Maine, Bathe is a successful business owner and the father of five children. His son, Landon Bathe, followed in his father's footsteps to professional hockey, signing a contract with the Phoenix Coyotes in 2004, only to encounter a similar career-ending injury. His daughter, Carrlyn Bathe, has worked as a sideline analyst for the Los Angeles Kings.

== Career statistics ==
			Regular season					Playoffs
Season	Team	League	GP	G	A	Pts	PIM	GP	G	A	Pts	PIM
1972–73	Windsor Spitfires	SOJHL	59	10	25	35	232	—	—	—	—	—
1973–74	Windsor Spitfires	SOJHL	58	19	34	53	306	—	—	—	—	—
1974–75	Detroit Red Wings	NHL	19	0	3	3	31	—	—	—	—	—
1974–75	Virginia Wings	AHL	50	7	11	18	146	—	—	—	—	—
1975–76	Detroit Red Wings	NHL	7	0	1	1	9	—	—	—	—	—
1975–76	New Haven Nighthawks	AHL	7	0	1	1	24	—	—	—	—	—
1975–76	Kalamazoo Wings	IHL	14	0	5	5	46	—	—	—	—	—
1975–76	Port Huron Flags	IHL	43	2	3	5	148	15	0	4	4	54
1976–77	Port Huron Flags	IHL	71	7	30	37	250	—	—	—	—	—
1977–78	Philadelphia Flyers	NHL	1	0	0	0	0	—	—	—	—	—
1977–78	Maine Mariners	AHL	78	4	11	15	159	12	1	1	2	24
1978–79	Philadelphia Flyers	NHL	21	1	3	4	76	6	1	0	1	12
1978–79	Maine Mariners	AHL	26	3	3	6	106	—	—	—	—	—
1979–80	Philadelphia Flyers	NHL	47	0	7	7	111	1	0	0	0	0
1980–81	Philadelphia Flyers	NHL	44	0	3	3	175	12	0	3	3	16
1981–82	Philadelphia Flyers	NHL	28	1	3	4	68	4	0	0	0	2
1982–83	Philadelphia Flyers	NHL	57	1	8	9	72	3	0	0	0	12
1983–84	Maine Mariners	AHL	4	1	0	1	2	—	—	—	—	—
1983–84	Philadelphia Flyers	NHL	—	—	—	—	—	1	0	0	0	0
NHL totals			223	3	28	31	542	27	1	3	4	42
AHL totals			165	15	26	41	437	12	1	1	2	24
IHL totals			128	9	38	47	444	15	0	4	4	54
