= Bob Miller (sportscaster) =

American retired sportscaster (born 1938)

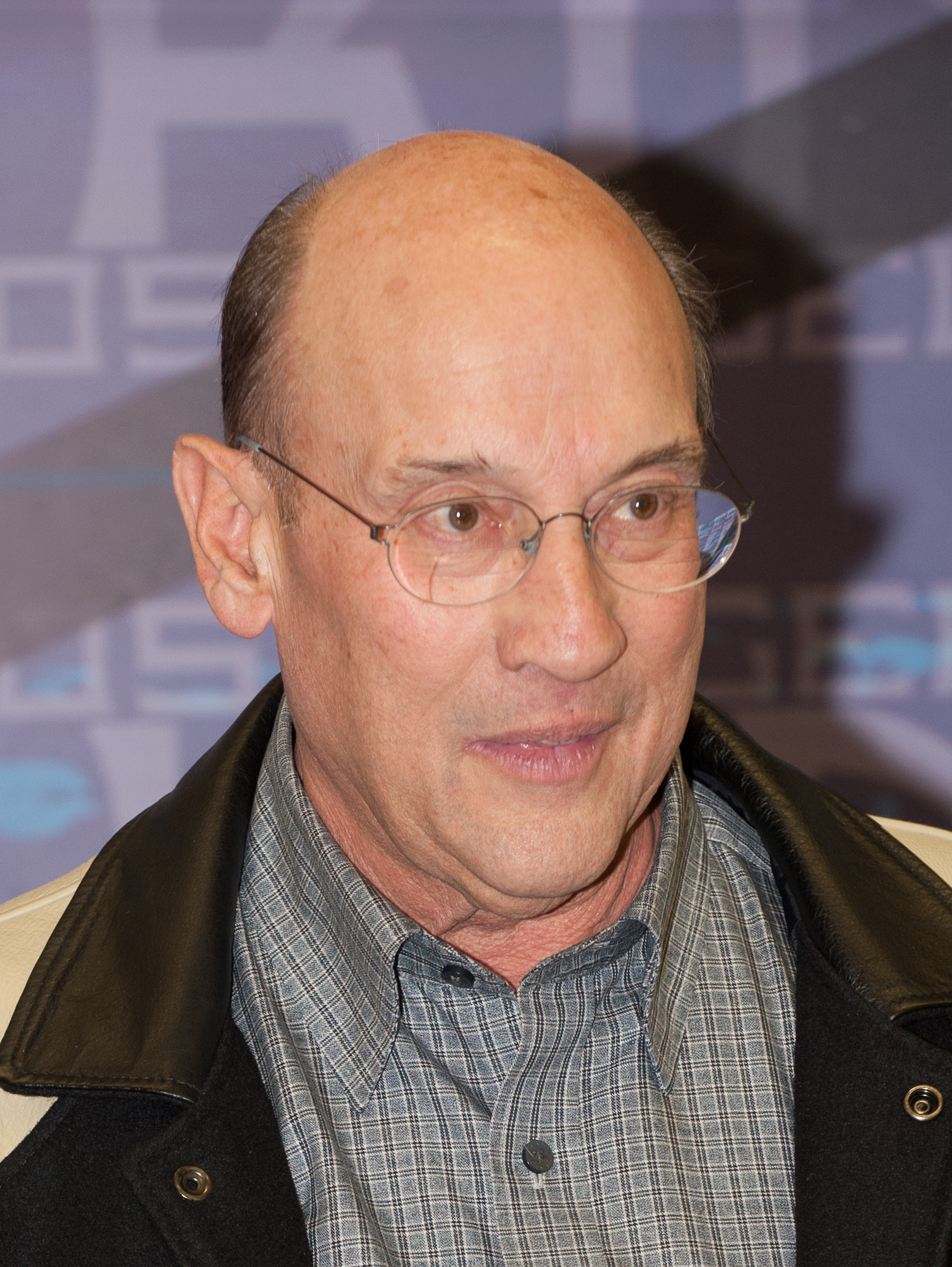
- Miller in 2011
- Born: Robert James Miller; October 12, 1938 (age 88); Chicago, Illinois, U.S.
- Sports commentary career
- Team: Los Angeles Kings (1973–2017)
- Genre: play-by-play (television)
- Sport: Ice hockey

Robert James Miller (born October 12, 1938) is an American retired sportscaster, best known as the play-by-play announcer for the Los Angeles Kings team of the National Hockey League on Fox Sports West/Prime Ticket. Miller held that post with the team from 1973 until his retirement in 2017. He was partnered with Jim Fox from 1990 to 2017.

== Early life and career ==
Miller received his degree in communication studies from the University of Iowa. While there, he began his broadcasting career, covering the school's football and basketball games for campus station WSUI.

After his graduation in 1960, Miller began working in television sports journalism in Wisconsin. He later would add announcing duties for the football and hockey teams at the University of Wisconsin–Madison.

== Los Angeles Kings ==
Jiggs McDonald was the Kings' original play-by-play announcer, serving from their inception in 1967 to 1972, when he left to join the newly established then-Atlanta Flames (now the Calgary Flames). In 1972, Miller submitted a tape to Kings founder and owner Jack Kent Cooke, who was also the owner of the Los Angeles Lakers basketball team. Although Cooke said to him, "You're going to be my choice", Cooke instead hired long-time San Francisco Bay Area announcer Roy Storey to fill the void left by McDonald. Chick Hearn made the decision to hire Miller.

When Storey left the team after one season, the Kings turned their attention back to Miller, who was hired in 1973, and served as their play-by-play announcer until his retirement in 2017. Miller's broadcast partners have included Dan Avey; Rich Marotta; Pete Weber, the current radio voice of the Nashville Predators; retired Kings radio voice Nick Nickson; and former Kings right wing Jim Fox. He called games on both television and radio until 1990, when the Kings stopped simulcasting and Miller went exclusively to television.

Due to the NHL's exclusive national broadcast contract with NBC that prevented local television announcers from calling playoff games beyond the first round, Miller and Fox were not allowed to call the Kings' Stanley Cup Final games on television. But due to their overwhelming popularity among fans, Kings management had Miller and Fox record their call of the potential clinching games for later distribution.

As a result, when the Kings won their first Stanley Cup in franchise history in 2012, Miller told the story of the franchise up to that point when he said:

This is for you, Kings fans, wherever you may be. All the frustration and disappointment of the past is gone. The 45-year drought is over! The Los Angeles Kings are indeed the kings of the National Hockey League. They are the 2012 Stanley Cup champions! The countdown is on–3, 2, 1, it's over!

Miller later recalled that he'd written out his final call in advance, and saved it so he could keep from stumbling over the words out of excitement. With the Kings having locked up the game and the Cup with an outburst of three goals on a five-minute power play in the first period, many fans sitting below the press box exchanged high fives with Miller and Fox during the final minutes.

In the 2014 Stanley Cup Final, Miller called Alec Martinez' overtime goal, which gave the Kings their second Stanley Cup.

Here on the left side, Martinez over to Clifford. Right side, shot from there. The save, the rebound, SCORE! Kings win the Cup! The Kings, Martinez getting the rebound. The Kings have won the Stanley Cup! The Kings, in the longest game in their history, win it, 3-2!

As the celebration got underway, Miller added a postscript which began, "Royalty reigns again in the National Hockey League!" He later recalled that he had been saving it for the Cup-clinching game, as he had in 2012.

Miller's first book, Tales From the Los Angeles Kings, was published in October 2006.

Miller's second book, Tales From The Los Angeles Kings Locker Room: A Collection Of The Greatest Kings Stories Ever Told, was published in April 2013.

On March 2, 2017, for health reasons, Miller announced his retirement as the team's television play-by-play announcer, a position he held for 44 years, and at the time of the announcement, having called 3,351 Kings games. His retirement became effective after the final two regular season games of the Kings' 2016–17 season, a home game against the Chicago Blackhawks on April 8, 2017, and a road game against the Anaheim Ducks on April 9, 2017. On September 12, 2017, the Kings announced that Bob Miller would remain with the Kings organization as an ambassador and continue to contribute to the team on a part-time basis which includes being the MC for the Kings Legends Nights.

=== Other appearances ===
He has performed voice over and on-camera work for television shows and movies in scenes which included a hockey announcer. Among his credits are an episode of Cheers and the films Rollerball, Miracle on Ice, The Mighty Ducks, and D2: The Mighty Ducks. Nationally, he has worked for ESPN, ABC and FOX. He also called some games for FX during the 1996 World Cup of Hockey.

== Honors ==
Miller was honored by the Hockey Hall of Fame as the 2000 recipient of the Foster Hewitt Memorial Award, and was inducted into the Los Angeles Kings Hall of Fame, into the Wisconsin Hockey Hall of Fame, and into the Southern California Sports Broadcasters Hall of Fame. The press box at Crypto.com, the Kings' home arena, is named in his honor.

Miller received the 2,319th star on the Hollywood Walk of Fame, in television, on October 2, 2006. At the ceremony he noted, "My greatest fear is that I retire and the Kings win a Stanley Cup the next year." Those fears would never come to be as on June 11, 2012, the Kings finally won the Stanley Cup. The team would win another one two years later in 2014.

In 2014, Miller was honored by the Big Ten Club as their Person of the Year. In 2015, Miller received the Radio and Television News Association of Southern California's Lifetime Achievement Award at the 65th annual Golden Mike Awards.

On January 13, 2018, Miller became the third person from the Los Angeles Kings to be honored with a statue outside of Staples Center, joining Luc Robitaille and Wayne Gretzky. Miller also became the first non-player to be honored with a banner hanging from the Staples Center's rafters.

== Personal ==
Miller is married. He and his wife Judy have two children.

Preceded by Richard Garneau	Foster Hewitt Memorial Award winner 2000	Succeeded by Mike Lange
