= Daryl Evans =

Canadian ice hockey player (born 1961)

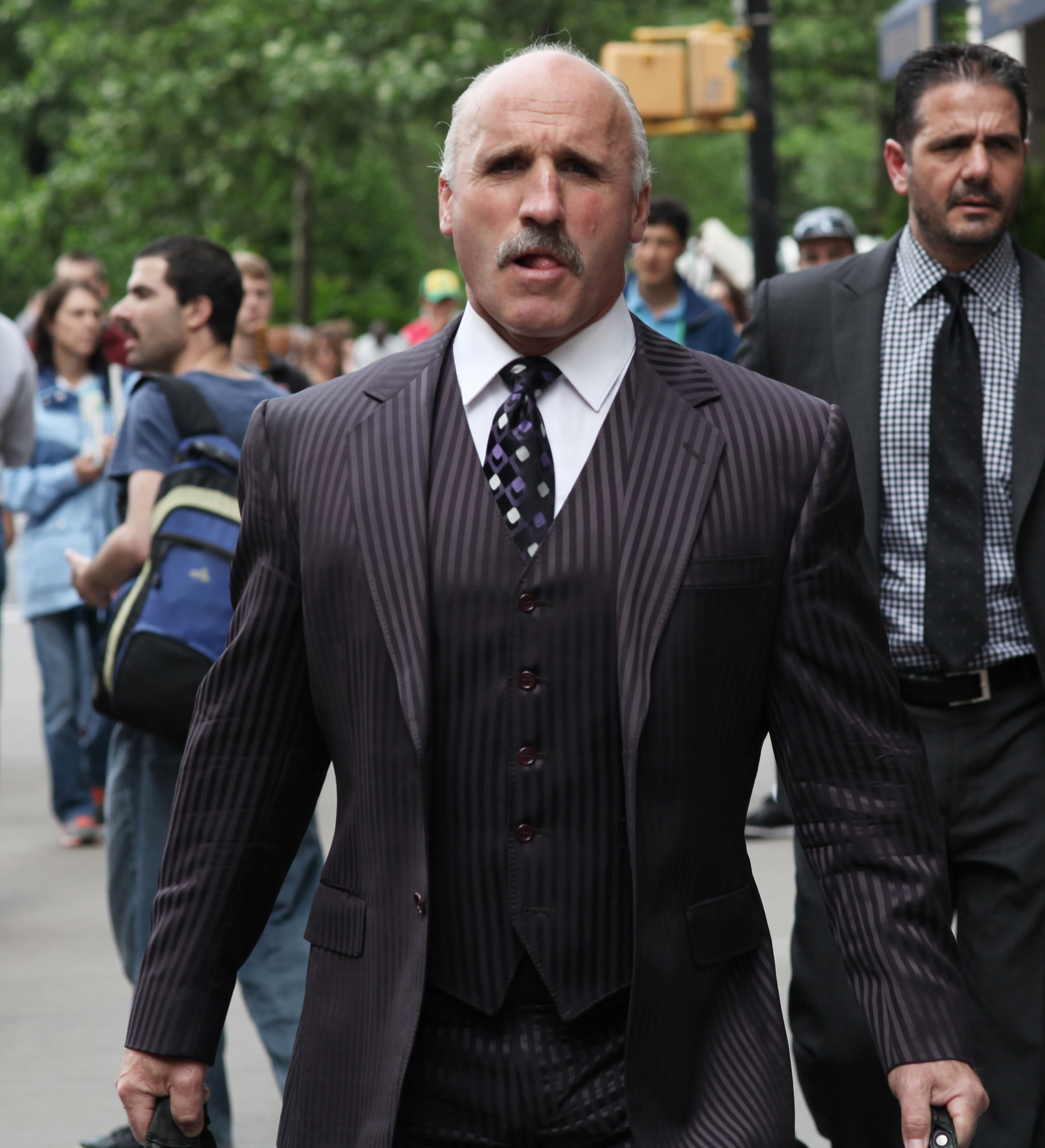
- Evans in New York City in June 2014
- Born: January 12, 1961 (age 65) Toronto, Ontario, Canada
- Height: 5 ft 8 in (173 cm)
- Weight: 185 lb (84 kg; 13 st 3 lb)
- Position: Left wing
- Shot: Left
- Played for: Los Angeles Kings; Washington Capitals; Toronto Maple Leafs; Whitley Warriors
- NHL draft: 178th overall, 1980; Los Angeles Kings
- Playing career: 1981–1991

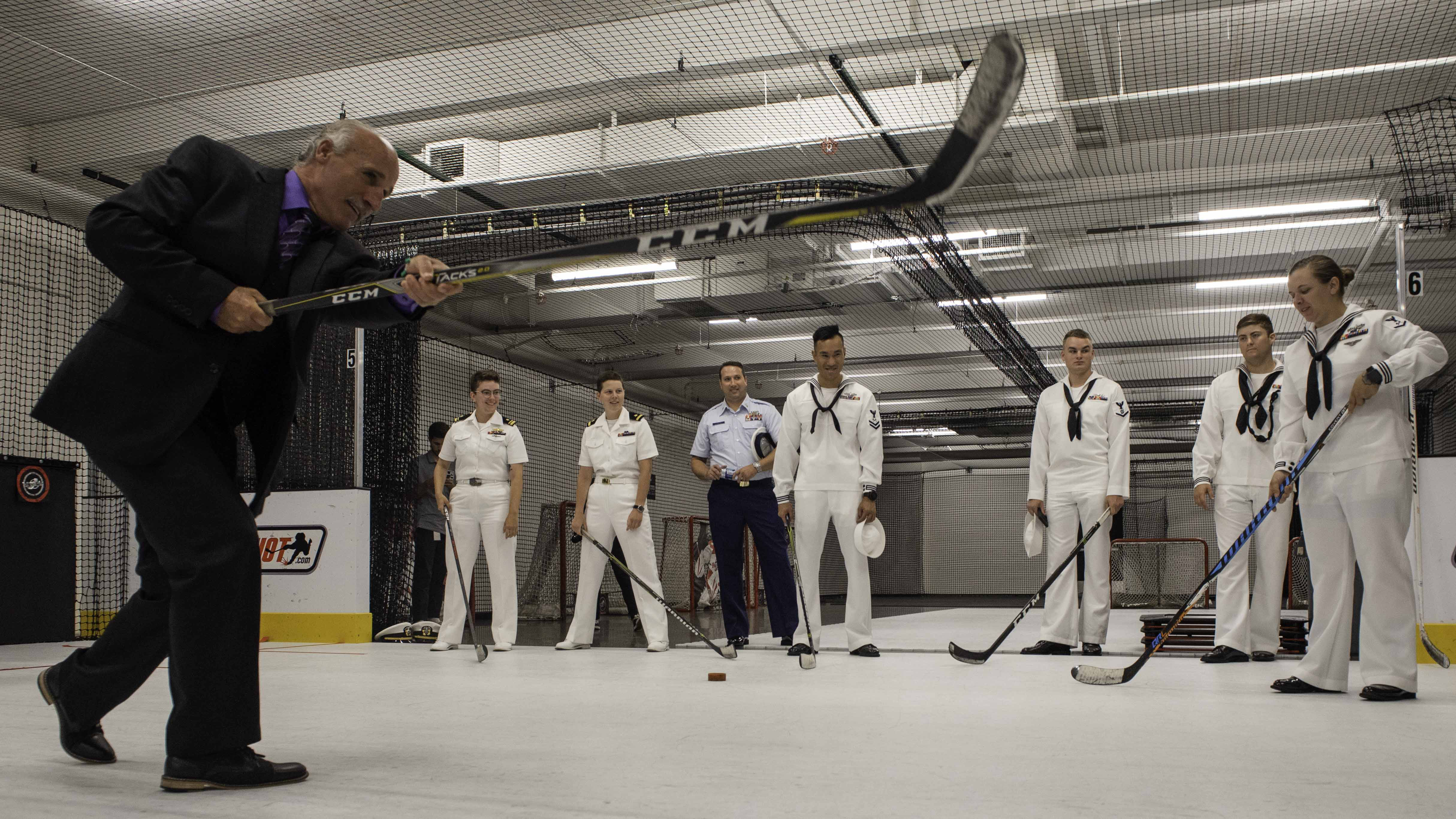
Evans with US Navy sailors in 2019

Daryl Thomas Evans (born January 12, 1961) is a Canadian former professional ice hockey player. He played in the National Hockey League with the Los Angeles Kings, Washington Capitals, and Toronto Maple Leafs between 1982 and 1987. The rest of his career, which lasted from 1981 to 1991, was spent in the minor leagues. He is currently the ice-side commentator for the Los Angeles Kings.

== Hockey career ==
As a youth, Evans played in the 1974 Quebec International Pee-Wee Hockey Tournament with the Toronto Young Nats. Daryl and the Nats won the tournament that year.

Evans was born in Toronto, Ontario. Drafted in 1980 by the Los Angeles Kings, Evans also played six games for the Washington Capitals and two games for the Toronto Maple Leafs.

He scored the game winning goal in the 'Miracle on Manchester’, one of the most significant goals in Los Angeles Kings history.

== Broadcasting career ==
Evans has been the radio color commentator for the Los Angeles Kings since 1998, alongside play-by-play voice Nick Nickson.

== Charity work ==
Evans participates in many charity events for the Kings and teaches sponsored adult hockey Clinics at Toyota Center. Evans is known to be an excellent skater, having built up his ability by skating without laces

== Personal life ==
Evans resides in Redondo Beach, California and has two children.

== Career statistics ==
=== Regular season and playoffs ===
			Regular season					Playoffs
Season	Team	League	GP	G	A	Pts	PIM	GP	G	A	Pts	PIM
1977–78	Toronto Nationals U18	U18 AAA	40	25	35	60	50	—	—	—	—	—
1978–79	Niagara Falls Flyers	OMJHL	65	38	26	64	110	20	5	5	10	32
1979–80	Niagara Falls Flyers	OMJHL	63	43	52	95	47	10	5	13	18	6
1980–81	Niagara Falls Flyers	OHL	5	3	4	7	11	—	—	—	—	—
1980–81	Brantford Alexanders	OHL	58	58	54	112	50	6	4	5	9	5
1980–81	Saginaw Gears	IHL	3	3	2	5	0	—	—	—	—	—
1981–82	Los Angeles Kings	NHL	14	2	6	8	2	10	5	8	13	12
1981–82	New Haven Nighthawks	AHL	41	14	14	28	10	—	—	—	—	—
1982–83	Los Angeles Kings	NHL	80	18	22	40	21	—	—	—	—	—
1983–84	Los Angeles Kings	NHL	4	0	1	1	0	—	—	—	—	—
1983–84	New Haven Nighthawks	AHL	69	51	34	85	14	—	—	—	—	—
1984–85	Los Angeles Kings	NHL	7	1	0	1	2	—	—	—	—	—
1984–85	New Haven Nighthawks	AHL	59	22	24	46	12	—	—	—	—	—
1985–86	Washington Capitals	NHL	6	0	1	1	0	—	—	—	—	—
1985–86	Binghamton Whalers	AHL	69	40	52	92	50	5	6	2	8	0
1986–87	Toronto Maple Leafs	NHL	2	1	0	1	0	1	0	0	0	0
1986–87	Newmarket Saints	AHL	74	27	46	73	17	—	—	—	—	—
1987–88	Newmarket Saints	AHL	57	29	36	65	10	—	—	—	—	—
1988–89	Newmarket Saints	AHL	64	29	30	59	16	5	1	1	2	0
1989–90	HC Gherdëina	ITA-2	32	32	65	97	28	—	—	—	—	—
1990–91	Whitley Warriors	BHL	6	10	9	19	6	8	18	22	40	6
AHL totals			433	212	236	448	129	10	7	3	10	0
NHL totals			113	22	30	52	25	11	5	8	13	12
