= Nick Nickson =

American sportscaster (born 1953)

Nicholas R. Nickson (born December 21, 1953) is a retired American sportscaster who served as the television and radio play-by-play announcer for the Los Angeles Kings of the National Hockey League.

== Biography ==
=== Early career ===
A native of Rochester, New York, Nickson attended Ithaca College, where he served as the Sports Director and play-by-play announcer for the school's radio station, WICB. His professional broadcasting career began in 1975 with the Rochester Americans. From 1977 to 1981 he called games for the New Haven Nighthawks.

=== Kings broadcasting career ===
Nickson joined the Kings in 1981, calling games on TV and radio with Bob Miller. When the TV and radio broadcasts were separated in 1990, Nickson became the Kings radio play-by-play announcer. He has called all three of the Kings' appearances in the Stanley Cup Final.

As such, he was the voice Kings fans heard on the radio when they won their first-ever Stanley Cup. At the end of that game, Nickson told the story of the franchise up to that point when he bellowed:

Ten seconds left. Puck behind the Kings' net, centered by Parise. The long wait is over! After 45 years, the Kings can wear their crown! The Los Angeles Kings are Stanley Cup champions!

In the 2014 Stanley Cup Final, Nickson called Alec Martinez' goal in double overtime to give the Kings their second Cup.

Now the puck behind the net, centered by Brassard. Cleared by the Kings, picked up by Martinez. Martinez to Clifford, feeds it right side to Tyler Toffoli, with a shot–save, rebound, SCORE! Alec Martinez has won the Stanley Cup for the Los Angeles Kings! Alec Martinez on the rebound, and royalty reigns again in the NHL!

Nickson later recalled that he and Miller had had time to pace themselves for their Cup-winning calls in 2012, as the Kings had put the game out of reach by scoring three unanswered goals on a five-minute power play in the first period. They didn't have that luxury in 2014.

In June 2015, the Hockey Hall of Fame announced that Nickson would be the 2015 recipient of the Foster Hewitt Memorial Award, officially being so honored on November 9, 2015. He becomes the third Kings broadcaster to be inducted into the Hall of Fame, following Jiggs McDonald (1990) and Bob Miller (2000).

On June 5, 2023, the Kings announced the television and radio broadcasts would be merged, with Nickson remaining the play-by-play announcer after the contract of Alex Faust was not renewed by the team.. Nickson retired at the end of the 2024-25 NHL season.

From 1983 to 1988, Nickson served as a public address announcer for the Los Angeles Dodgers. During that time, he called the National League Championship Series and World Series during the Dodgers' championship season of 1988.
