= Carrlyn Bathe =

American sports broadcaster (born 1988)

- Born: April 30, 1988 (age 37); Scarborough, Maine, US
- Occupation: Sports broadcaster
- Employer: Los Angeles Kings

Carrlyn Bathe (born April 30, 1988) is an American sports broadcaster who currently serves as the sideline reporter for the Los Angeles Kings. She has also covered the Los Angeles Angels, WWE, and UFC. She voice acted in the video game NHL 21, making her the first female broadcaster to appear in the series.

== Early life ==
Carrlyn Bathe was born on April 30, 1988, and is from Scarborough, Maine. Her father, Frank Bathe, played for the Philadelphia Flyers and the Detroit Red Wings of the National Hockey League (NHL). Bathe played hockey for Scarborough High School before graduating and moving to Los Angeles in 2007.

== Career ==
At the age of 19, Bathe successfully auditioned for the Los Angeles Kings ice crew, and remained with the crew for five years. She was inspired by female sportscaster Heidi Androl to seek a career in sports broadcasting. While a member of the Kings' ice crew, Bathe took improv classes, which she cited as improving her broadcasting abilities, and created a vlog series about the ice crew, which was eventually hosted on FOX Sports West's website.

Following her vlog series, Bathe received the opportunity to become the Staples Center in-arena host, a position she held for three years. She then started working for FOX Sports Digital, covering the NHL, WWE, and UFC. Bathe was hired as the sideline reporter for the Los Angeles Kings for the 2018–19 season, a position she still holds as of the 2024-25 season. She has also worked as a reporter for the Los Angeles Angels in live and pre-recorded segments. Bathe voice acted in the video game NHL 21, making her the first female broadcaster to appear in the series. She was also a presenter at the 73rd Los Angeles Emmy Awards.

== Personal life ==
Bathe married Mike Hammer on October 10, 2020. The two met after Hammer sent Bathe gear from his clothing brand, Violent Gentlemen. She began streaming gameplay on Twitch during the COVID-19 pandemic.
