= FanDuel Sports Network SoCal =

American regional sports network

- Type: Regional sports network
- Country: United States
- Broadcast area: Southern California; Las Vegas Valley; Hawaii; Nationwide (via satellite)
- Network: FanDuel Sports Network
- Headquarters: Los Angeles, California

Programming
- Languages: English; Spanish (via SAP)
- Picture format: 720p (HDTV); 480i (SDTV)

Ownership
- Owner: Main Street Sports Group

History
- Launched: January 27, 1997; 29 years ago
- Replaced: SportsChannel Los Angeles
- Closed: September 30, 2026 (15 days ago)
- Former names: Fox Sports West 2 (1997–1999); Fox Sports Net West 2 (1999–2004); FSN West 2 (2004–2006); Prime Ticket (2006–2021); Bally Sports SoCal (2021–2024)

Links
- Website: www.fanduelsportsnetwork.com

FanDuel Sports Network SoCal was an American regional sports network owned by Main Street Sports Group (formerly Diamond Sports Group) and operated as part of FanDuel Sports Network. The channel broadcasts regional coverage of professional and collegiate sports events in California, focusing primarily on teams based in the Greater Los Angeles area. FanDuel Sports Network SoCal is available on cable providers throughout Southern California, the Las Vegas Valley and Hawaii; it is also available nationwide on satellite via DirecTV.

The network holds the regional broadcast rights to the Los Angeles Clippers of the National Basketball Association, Los Angeles Kings of the National Hockey League and West Coast Conference men's and women's basketball. The network also broadcast the Los Angeles Dodgers of Major League Baseball until 2014, when broadcasts moved to Spectrum SportsNet LA, and broadcast the Anaheim Ducks of the National Hockey League until 2024, when broadcasts moved to Victory+ and KCOP-TV.

== History ==
=== Beginnings ===
The original Prime Ticket (currently FanDuel Sports Network West) was launched on October 19, 1985, and became one of the leading regional sports networks in the United States. Rival network SportsChannel Los Angeles ceased operations on December 31, 1992, which would eventually create a need for a new regional sports network. After SportsChannel's closure, Prime Ticket acquired the broadcast rights to the Los Angeles Angels and Los Angeles Clippers which had previously broadcast on SportsChannel. However, the Los Angeles Dodgers opted not to make a deal with Prime Ticket, instead staying off cable for the next four seasons. The network would retain the Prime Ticket name until it was rebranded in 1994 as Prime Sports West and later then Fox Sports West in 1996 when it joined Fox Sports Net.

=== Fox Sports West 2 ===
On January 27, 1997, Fox Sports Net launched an additional channel, Fox Sports West 2, to provide the broadcast of 40 Los Angeles Dodgers games. The Dodgers had not had any local cable broadcasts of their games since the 1992 season. Additionally, Los Angeles Clippers and Anaheim Ducks games were moved from Fox Sports West, as well as UCLA and USC basketball games that were not part of Fox's existing Pac-10 package. Other new programming included coverage of other college sports at UCLA and USC, high school basketball and football, and horse racing from Santa Anita and Hollywood Park Initially Fox Sports West 2 did not have widespread cable coverage, leading to many complaints and a failed lawsuit by the Ducks seeking to return their games back on Fox Sports West. Four months after it launched the new network had secured deals to reach 1.1 million subscribers, representing less than one-fourth the coverage of its parent network.

In 2000, Fox Sports West 2 was rebranded as Fox Sports Net West 2, as part of a collective brand modification of the FSN networks under the "Fox Sports Net" banner. In 2004, this was shortened to FSN West 2.

=== As Prime Ticket ===
Logos for Fox Sports West and Prime Ticket, used from 2009 to 2012.

Former Prime Ticket logo, used from 2012 to 2021

On April 3, 2006, FSN West 2 was rebranded as FSN Prime Ticket; the rebranding was intended to reduce the perception that FSN West 2 was an inferior network, and also served as an homage to FSN West's original Prime Ticket branding. The rebrand came amid an expanded investment into local programs across both channels, including new high school sports programming, and the replacement of the Southern Carolina Sports Report with team-specific post-game shows.

On June 20, 2011, Commissioner of Baseball Bud Selig rejected a proposed contract extension between the Los Angeles Dodgers and Prime Ticket, citing concerns that the deal was structured in a way that most of the proceeds would end up being assigned to beleaguered Dodgers owner Frank McCourt and not the team's operations. Both Fox Sports West and the Dodgers were involved in separate lawsuits over the team's broadcast rights as well as the sale of the club. On January 10, 2012, Fox and the Dodgers reached a settlement in court, clearing the way for the sale of the team. Fox's exclusive negotiating period with the Dodgers expired on November 30, 2012 – leaving the team open to competing offers. In January 2013, Time Warner Cable signed with the Los Angeles Dodgers, establishing a new team-specific channel known as SportsNet LA.

In 2014, Prime Ticket began broadcasting Arizona Diamondbacks games via Fox Sports Arizona for viewers in the Las Vegas Valley.

=== As Bally/FanDuel Sports Network SoCal ===
Former logo as Bally Sports SoCal, used from 2021 to 2024.

On December 14, 2017, as part of a merger between both companies, The Walt Disney Company announced plans to acquire all 22 regional Fox Sports networks from 21st Century Fox, including Fox Sports West and Prime Ticket. However, on June 27, 2018, the Justice Department ordered their divestment under antitrust grounds, citing Disney's ownership of ESPN. On May 3, 2019, Sinclair Broadcast Group and Entertainment Studios (through their joint venture, Diamond Holdings) bought Fox Sports Networks from The Walt Disney Company for $10.6 billion. The deal closed on August 22, 2019.

On November 17, 2020, Sinclair announced an agreement with casino operator Bally's Corporation to serve as a new naming rights partner for the FSN channels. Sinclair announced the new Bally Sports branding for the channels on January 27, 2021. On March 31, 2021, the channel was rebranded as Bally Sports SoCal, dropping the "Prime Ticket" branding in the process.

On March 14, 2023, Diamond Sports filed for Chapter 11 bankruptcy. On August 27, 2024, the Anaheim Ducks cut ties with Bally Sports SoCal, and announced agreements with Victory+ and Fox Television Stations to carry its regional games for free on a FAST channel and KCOP-TV.

On October 21, 2024, the network rebranded as FanDuel Sports Network West as part of a new sponsorship with FanDuel, following Diamond's exit from bankruptcy as Main Street Sports Group.

In February 2026, amid financial difficulties at Main Street Sports Group, it was reported that the company planned to shut down all of its networks following the conclusion of the current NBA and NHL seasons, after having terminated its contracts with the MLB teams it held rights to. On March 9, 2026, the Los Angeles Angels announced that they would acquire FanDuel Sports Network West from Main Street outright, with an aim to maintain continuity and existing distribution agreements. The SoCal channel was not mentioned, and the Clippers announced that they would move its games to the team owned ClipperVision service (with NBA Entertainment taking over production from FanDuel Sports Network) with the team also announcing that it would expand the service with cable and satellite feeds. In a transitional move, it was announced on March 18 that the Los Angeles Kings would move the remainder of its regional games for the 2025–26 season to FanDuel Sports Network SoCal; the Angels-owned channel renewed its rights to the Kings for the 2026–27 season.

== Programming ==
=== Overflow coverage ===
In the Los Angeles market, in the case of scheduling conflicts, FanDuel Sports Network SoCal will move a scheduled telecast of a Clippers or Ducks (prior to 2024-25 season) game to KCOP-TV (Channel 13), the local MyNetworkTV owned-and-operated station and former sister station to the two networks. Select Ducks games were also shown on Bally Sports West prior to the 2024–25 NHL season. Those KCOP Clippers and Ducks (prior to 2024-25 season) telecasts may also be streamed via the Bally Sports app for those outside of the Los Angeles DMA; Prior to the 2016-17 season, Ducks games were not streamed on the application, as Fox Sports and the National Hockey League did not come to a streaming rights agreement until the summer of 2016.

== Notable on-air staff ==
=== Current ===
Los Angeles Clippers

- Jim Jackson – analyst
- Don MacLean – Clippers Live analyst (former UCLA basketball commentator)
- Corey Maggette — Clippers Live analyst
- Jaime Maggio — Los Angeles Clippers sideline reporter (fil-in)
- Kristina Pink – Los Angeles Clippers sideline reporter
- Brian Sieman – Los Angeles Clippers announcer
- Jeanne Zelasko — Clippers Live host (rotating)
- Stan Verrett - studio host

Los Angeles Kings

- Carrlyn Bathe – Los Angeles Kings sideline reporter (home games only)
- Daryl Evans – Kings Live analyst (road games only)
- Jim Fox – Los Angeles Kings commentator (former analyst for Kings "Break The Ice")
- Jon Rosen – Los Angeles Kings sideline reporter (road games only)
- Jared Shafran – Los Angeles Kings play-by-play announcer
- Josh Schaefer – Los Angeles Kings play-by-play announcer
- Sean O'Donnell – Kings Live analyst (home games only)

=== Former ===
- Chauncey Billups – Los Angeles Clippers analyst
- Michael Cage – Clippers Live analyst, former USC commentator and former analyst for Lakers Live and Bruins Live
- Eric Collins – Dodgers road announcer (games east of Arizona) and Dodgers Live anchor
- Carolyn Hughes – Dodgers Dugout (2005)
- Marques Johnson – Pac-12 basketball commentator and (2007) Trojans Live March Madness analyst
- Eric Karros – Dodgers postseason studio analyst (2003)
- Kevin Kennedy – Major League Baseball analyst
- Ralph Lawler - former Los Angeles Clippers play-by-play announcer
- Steve Lyons – Los Angeles Dodgers road commentator and Dodgers Live analyst
- Bill Macdonald – baseball, basketball, football and hockey announcer
- Adrian Garcia Marquez – Dodgers Live reporter
- Chris McGee – Clippers Live reporter, and high school football announcer
- Marty McSorley – NHL analyst (2006)
- Rick Monday – Dodgers play-by-play announcer and Dugout analyst
- Petros Papadakis – USC football analyst and Pac-12 football commentator
- Steve Physioc – Los Angeles Angels and Pac-12 basketball announcer
- Ross Porter – Dodgers play-by-play announcer
- Lindsay Rhodes – sideline reporter, and anchor of Trojans Live and Southern California Sports Report
- Vin Scully – Los Angeles Dodgers announcer (2005–2013, retired)
- Charley Steiner – Dodgers road announcer
- Matt Stevens – UCLA football analyst
- Paul Sunderland – Pac-12, Big West and Lakers basketball announcer
- Barry Tompkins – Pac-12 football and basketball announcer
- Jim Watson – Pac-12 and LA Galaxy announcer, sideline reporter, and anchor of "Dodgers Live" and "Dodgers Dugout"
- Paul Westphal – NBA analyst, USC basketball commentator
- Van Earl Wright – anchor of Southern California Sports Report, Dodgers Dugout (2004) and Kings "Break the Ice" (2004)
- John Ahlers – Anaheim Ducks play-by-play announcer
- Kent French — Ducks Live host
- Brian Hayward – Anaheim Ducks color commentator and Ducks Live analyst
- Guy Hebert — Ducks Live analyst
- Mike Pomeranz — Ducks Live host (rotating)

== Out-of-market availability and carriage ==
=== San Diego County ===
FanDuel Sports Network SoCal maintains widespread cable carriage in San Diego County. However, the two major providers in the area, Time Warner Cable and Cox Communications, refused to carry Prime Ticket since its launch in 1997; both cable providers claim that the network has asked for carriage fees they deemed to be too expensive for carriage on their expanded basic tiers. The network remained available on cable systems acquired by Time Warner Cable in 2006 as part of the Adelphia bankruptcy, which had carried Prime Ticket since 2001.

On March 17, 2012, as part of a contract signed with FSN to acquire the local cable rights to the San Diego Padres, Fox Sports Networks created a separate regional network for the San Diego market, Fox Sports/Bally Sports San Diego, which closed in April 2024. Despite that channel's launch, Bally Sports West's availability never changed and it remains available on cable providers in the San Diego area. Bally Sports San Diego often duplicated Bally Sports SoCal's own schedule outside Padres games, which meant all programming on both channels was available to all viewers and both channels were folded into carriage agreements.

=== Las Vegas Valley ===
Bally Sports West and Bally Sports SoCal maintain widespread cable carriage in the Las Vegas Valley, though with the inaugural season of the Vegas Golden Knights, Kings games began to be blacked out on Prime Ticket/FDSN SoCal in the 2017–2018 NHL season, ceding to Scripps Sports's coverage of Golden Knights games on KMCC; Kings games remain available through ESPN+ in Southern Nevada so long as the Golden Knights are not involved.
