= Jim Fox (ice hockey) =

Canadian ice hockey player (born 1960)

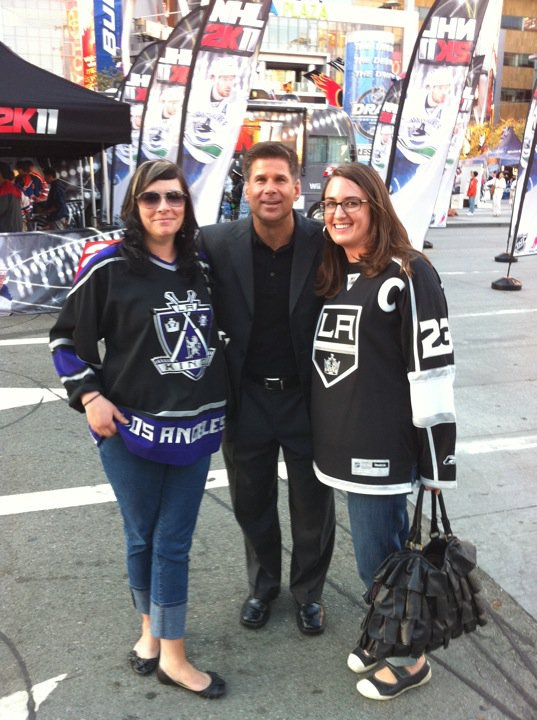
- Born: May 18, 1960 (age 66) Coniston, Ontario, Canada
- Height: 5 ft 8 in (173 cm)
- Weight: 185 lb (84 kg; 13 st 3 lb)
- Position: Right wing
- Shot: Right
- Played for: Los Angeles Kings
- National team: Canada
- NHL draft: 10th overall, 1980; Los Angeles Kings
- Playing career: 1980–1989

James Charles Fox (born May 18, 1960) is a Canadian former professional ice hockey player who played nine seasons in the National Hockey League (NHL) for the Los Angeles Kings. He has been part of the Kings organization for four decades and is currently the Kings' television colour commentator.

== Playing career ==
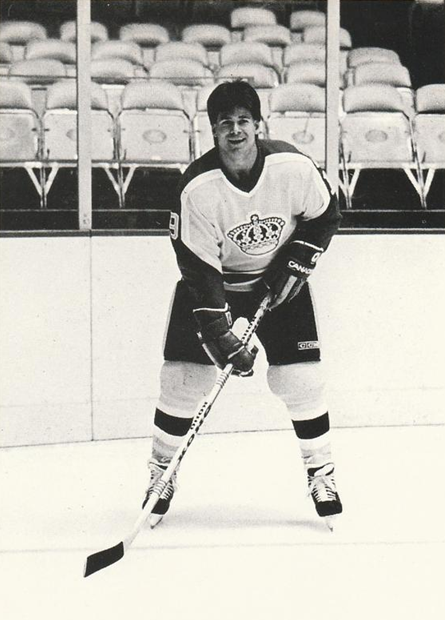
1986 photo of Fox for Los Angeles Kings

Fox's road to the NHL started in the Ontario Major Junior Hockey League playing for the Ottawa 67's under head coach Brian Kilrea who, coincidentally, played for Los Angeles during their inaugural season. Fox was a dominant scorer for Ottawa and notched a league-best 166 points in 52 games during the 1979-80 season which convinced Los Angeles to use a first-round selection on Fox at the 1980 NHL Entry Draft held at the Montreal Forum.

Fox was able to use his skill and speed to crack the Los Angeles lineup for the 1980-81 season and finished his rookie campaign with a respectable 18 goals and 42 points for a strong Kings team which finished with a 43-24-13 record under head coach Bob Berry. Fox scored his first NHL goal against Gilles Gilbert of Detroit on October 11, 1980.

Fox played a critical role in the tying goal during the Miracle on Manchester game against Edmonton in the 1982 playoffs, by stripping superstar Wayne Gretzky of the puck in the dying moments of the third period before Steve Bozek evened the score at 5-5 after Los Angeles had trailed 5-0 after two periods.

In 1984–85, his strongest season statistically, Fox managed over a point a game, finishing with 30-53-83 in 79 games. Knee injuries prematurely derailed his career, forcing him to retire at 29 after the realization his knees no longer allowed him to use the darting speed which had been the foundation of his success throughout his career. His final NHL goal was scored in St. Louis on October 21, 1989, against Blues goaltender Greg Millen.

== Post-playing career ==
Soon after his retirement, Fox was hired as the colour analyst on the Kings' television broadcasts alongside longtime play-by-play man Bob Miller on Fox Sports West/Prime Ticket. Miller and Fox were together for 27 years, including the Kings' first Stanley Cup Final run in 1993 and Stanley Cup victories in 2012 and 2014. Following Miller's retirement, Fox worked with play-by-play announcer and Brooklyn native, Alex Faust from the 2017–18 NHL season through the 2022-23 NHL Season. Since the 2023-24 NHL Season, Fox had worked with long-time Kings radio announcer Nick Nickson in what was a television/radio simulcast. Upon Nickson's retirement in 2025, Fox remained in his role on the broadcast team with play-by-play announcers John Kelly and Josh Schaefer.

Due to contractual obligations, Miller and Fox were not allowed to air games beyond the first round. However, due to their longstanding popularity in Southern California, the Kings had them recorded their calls of potential Cup-clinching games in 2012 and 2014 for future distribution.

He had the honour of being one of the speakers when Miller was honoured with a star on the Hollywood Walk of Fame in 2006. On January 25, 2016, Fox was rewarded for distinguished achievement in sports broadcasting and inducted into the Southern California Sports Broadcasters Hall of Fame.

In 2015, Jim Fox became acting League Commissioner of the LA Kings High School Hockey League, a newly formed league focusing on high school player development and competition. The LA Kings High School Hockey League is designed to continue the growth of ice hockey in Southern California and directly connect the sport to local communities and high schools.

A love for wines inspired Fox to study Enology through the University of California, Los Angeles between 2006-2008, as well as Winemaking with the University of California, Davis in 2014. He co-founded Patiné Cellars in 2011, which produces single-vineyard designate pinot noir.

== Career statistics ==
=== Regular season and playoffs ===
| | | | Regular season | | | | | Playoffs |
| Season | Team | League | GP | G | A | Pts | PIM | GP | G | A | Pts | PIM |
|---|---|---|---|---|---|---|---|---|---|---|---|---|
| 1975–76 | North Bay Trappers | OPJHL | 44 | 30 | 45 | 75 | 16 | — | — | — | — | — |
| 1975–76 | Sudbury Wolves | OMJHL | — | — | — | — | — | 4 | 3 | 3 | 6 | 0 |
| 1976–77 | North Bay Trappers | OPJHL | 38 | 44 | 64 | 108 | 4 | 19 | 13 | 25 | 38 | — |
| 1977–78 | Ottawa 67's | OMJHL | 59 | 44 | 83 | 127 | 12 | 13 | 7 | 14 | 21 | 0 |
| 1978–79 | Ottawa 67's | OMJHL | 53 | 37 | 66 | 103 | 4 | 4 | 2 | 1 | 3 | 2 |
| 1979–80 | Ottawa 67's | OMJHL | 52 | 65 | 101 | 166 | 30 | 11 | 6 | 14 | 20 | 2 |
| 1980–81 | Los Angeles Kings | NHL | 71 | 18 | 24 | 42 | 8 | 4 | 0 | 1 | 1 | 0 |
| 1981–82 | Los Angeles Kings | NHL | 77 | 30 | 38 | 68 | 23 | 9 | 1 | 4 | 5 | 0 |
| 1982–83 | Los Angeles Kings | NHL | 77 | 28 | 40 | 68 | 8 | — | — | — | — | — |
| 1983–84 | Los Angeles Kings | NHL | 80 | 30 | 42 | 72 | 26 | — | — | — | — | — |
| 1984–85 | Los Angeles Kings | NHL | 79 | 30 | 53 | 83 | 10 | 3 | 0 | 1 | 1 | 0 |
| 1985–86 | Los Angeles Kings | NHL | 39 | 14 | 17 | 31 | 2 | — | — | — | — | — |
| 1986–87 | Los Angeles Kings | NHL | 76 | 19 | 42 | 61 | 48 | 5 | 3 | 2 | 5 | 0 |
| 1987–88 | Los Angeles Kings | NHL | 68 | 16 | 35 | 51 | 18 | 1 | 0 | 0 | 0 | 0 |
| 1989–90 | Los Angeles Kings | NHL | 11 | 1 | 1 | 2 | 0 | — | — | — | — | — |
| NHL totals | | | 578 | 186 | 293 | 479 | 143 | 22 | 4 | 8 | 12 | 0 |

=== International ===
| Year | Team | Event | GP | G | A | Pts | PIM |
|---|---|---|---|---|---|---|---|
| 1980 | Canada | WJC | 5 | 3 | 2 | 5 | 0 |
| 1986 | Canada | WC | 10 | 3 | 2 | 5 | 4 |

| Preceded by Larry Murphy | Los Angeles Kings first-round draft pick 1980 | Succeeded by Doug Smith |
