= Rich Marotta =

American sports personality

Rich Marotta is an American sports personality in Reno, Nevada. After spending nearly 30 years in Los Angeles, Rich worked the final five years of his radio career on LA-based KFI AM 640, broadcasting from his Nevada home. In February 2011, he was inducted into the Southern California Sportscasters Hall of Fame. Then in June 2011, Rich was inducted into the California Boxing Hall of Fame. In 2013, Rich founded the non-profit Nevada Boxing Hall of Fame, which holds a glamorous Induction Spectacular every August at Caesars Palace in Las Vegas. Once described in the Los Angeles Daily News as "LA's most versatile sportscaster", he has been honored with 4 local Emmy Awards, 10 Golden Mic's and induction into two Halls of Fame.

== Overview ==
Rich holds the singular distinction of being the only sportscaster in Los Angeles to have ever been part of the regular broadcast teams of three major league franchises. He was the color analyst for the Los Angeles Kings of the NHL alongside Bob Miller, the Oakland/Los Angeles Raiders of the NFL, and Los Angeles Clippers in the NBA. Rich currently calls boxing on for various sports entities. In 2006, he won the Sam Taub Award for excellence in boxing broadcasting journalism. He could be heard for 23 years on the Bill Handel Show on KFI AM 640 Radio, and KLAC Sports AM 570 in Los Angeles.

Rich expanded his on the air role to providing political commentary, and covered the 2008 Democratic National Convention in Denver, Colorado for the Bill Handel Show.

Marotta was formerly the host of the radio boxing show The Neutral Corner, which aired for 11 years on KLAC 570 AM. After thirty-one years in radio, Rich retired from radio, signing off at 9:55 A.M on September 26, 2014, with Bill Handel (Handel on the News) at KFI AM 640 in Burbank, California. He continues to make periodic appearances on both radio and TV.

He has two children, Angela Rose and Joseph Marotta.
