= Doug Bell (sportscaster) =

American journalist

Doug Bell (born 1961) is a veteran sportscaster who works with WJOX-AM.

He served as sports director for WIAT, a CBS affiliate. He joined WJOX-AM where he provides hourly sports reports from 9:00 AM to 3:00 PM. In the past two years, Bell was the weeknight host of College Sports Central on the now-defunct College Sports Southeast. He has also worked for ESPN and hosts The Tee Time Golf Show on WVUA and WOTM and is a radio broadcaster for XM Sirius Radio. He has called games for the Alabama Crimson Tide, the NFL on Fox, NFL Europe for Fox, golf for SiriusXM PGA Tour Radio, PGA Tour Network, and college football and basketball for Fox Sports Net. He is divorced from Brenda Ladun who is a newscaster for ABC 33/40. Doug now works with iTalkSEC as a Host along with Scott Moore on www.italksec.com or 101.1 in Birmingham Alabama
