= Heidi Androl =

American television host, reporter, producer

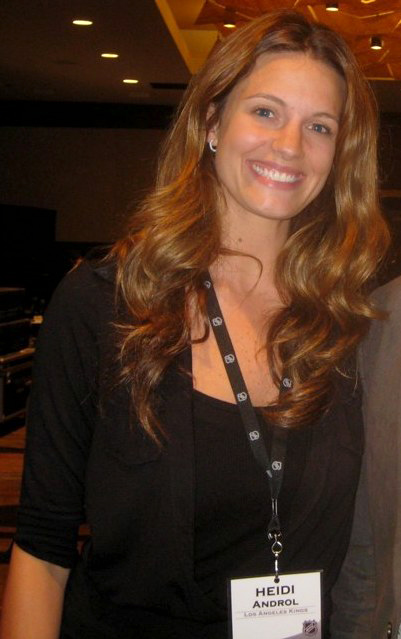
- Born: October 29, 1980 (age 45); Unionville, Michigan, U.S.
- Occupations: Sports Reporter Fox Sports, Fuel TV, Showtime Sports, UFC, NHL Network

Heidi Androl (born October 29, 1980) is an American television sports reporter. Androl currently serves as a host on NHL Network and for the Ultimate Fighting Championship. She was an interviewer for Showtime at Strikeforce mixed martial arts events.

== Biography ==
The oldest of three children, Androl was raised in Wisner, Michigan. Androl began modeling at age 13, and appeared in advertising, television and film. She attended the University of Michigan-Flint and Michigan State University, then moved to Los Angeles.

As a model, Androl appeared on networks including ESPN, USA, CBS, NBC, Fox, UPN, E! and TNT. Her hosting career has included topics on sports, entertainment and business.

In NFL, Androl working selected games with either analyst Heath Evans or Charles Davis and either play-by-play Sam Rosen or Gus Johnson.

Androl was hired as an apprentice in the aerospace industry. She was promoted to the position of national sales manager for FDC Aerofilter within a year, and then to international sales manager.

After appearing on The Apprentice Androl became the special events host for the Los Angeles Kings, involved with the club's official website and their online video network.

As of 2015 Androl hosted AT&T U-verse Theatre for AT&T U-verse, and NHL on the Fly on NHL Network. She works with Sam Rosen and Heath Evans on regional NFL telecasts for Fox.

=== The Apprentice appearance ===
Androl was on The Apprentice TV show, season 6, but did not win.
