= Alex Faust =

American sportscaster

- Born: January 14, 1989 (age 37); Brooklyn, New York, U.S.
- Education: Northeastern University (BA, BS)
- Years active: 2011–present
- Sports commentary career
- Genre: Play-by-play
- Sports: Ice hockey, Baseball, College football, College basketball

Alex Faust (born January 14, 1989) is an American television sportscaster. He is the lead play-by-play voice for the New York Rangers on radio, and a fill-in voice for the Rangers on television. Nationally, he calls Major League Baseball for Apple TV+, and Major League Baseball, the National Hockey League, and French Open tennis for TNT Sports.

Faust called Major League Baseball, college football and college basketball for Fox Sports and occasionally serves as a fill-in announcer for the network's National Football League coverage. He was also the television play-by-play announcer for the Los Angeles Kings from 2017 to 2023.

He gained additional fame in 2018 when Jeopardy! host Alex Trebek suggested Faust could replace him as the show's host.

== Early life and education ==
Born and raised in Brooklyn, New York, Faust is the son of television producers Rita and Allan Faust. He graduated from Northeastern University in Boston, Massachusetts, in 2012, with bachelor's degrees in political science and economics.

== Career ==
Faust started his broadcasting career as a student at Northeastern University, calling Huskies basketball and ice hockey on WRBB, the student radio station. After graduating from Northeastern, he worked at PricewaterhouseCoopers as a data analyst and consultant. He called select radio games for the Utica Comets of the American Hockey League from 2013 to 2015, filling in for Brendan Burke.

Looking to pursue a full-time career in broadcasting, Faust left PwC to freelance as an announcer, calling games for NBC Sports, NESN, ESPN, and Westwood One. He was hired to call college basketball games by NESN, and worked his way up to the lead play-by-play announcer for their coverage of Hockey East games.

Faust formerly called college football, college basketball, and Major League Baseball games for Fox Sports. He was named the television play-by-play voice for the Los Angeles Kings in June 2017, succeeding long-time Kings announcer Bob Miller. He called select Boston Red Sox games for NESN in 2019, filling in for Dave O'Brien when O'Brien had ACC Network commitments.

On June 5, 2023, the Kings opted not to renew Faust's contract amid the combination of their radio and TV broadcast groups in the wake of Diamond Sports Group bankruptcy, who own Bally Sports. However, he was hired as fill-in play-by-play announcer for the Boston Bruins on NESN and New York Rangers on radio.

In Week 4 of the 2023 NFL season, Faust filled in for Jason Benetti on Fox’s coverage of the Minnesota at Carolina game along with analyst Brady Quinn.

In 2025, TNT Sports promoted Faust to the #2 play by play announcer for MLB on TBS regular season and postseason broadcasts.

== Personal life ==
Faust currently resides in New York City.

In a 2018 interview with TMZ, Jeopardy! host Alex Trebek suggested Faust, as well as CNN legal analyst Laura Coates, as potential successors at host. Trebek noted that he had given Faust's name to the show's producers.
