= Jiggs McDonald =

Canadian sportscaster

- Born: John Kenneth McDonald; November 28, 1938 (age 87); Galt, Ontario, Canada
- Occupation: broadcaster
- Years active: 1967–present
- Spouse: Marilyn Thompson (m. 1962; died 2024)
- Children: 2
- Awards: Foster Hewitt Memorial Award (1990)

John Kenneth "Jiggs" McDonald (born November 28, 1938) is a Canadian sportscaster who has done play-by-play announcing for National Hockey League (NHL) games for more than 50 years. In 1990, McDonald received the Foster Hewitt Memorial Award from the Hockey Hall of Fame.

== Biography ==
=== National Hockey League broadcasting career ===
McDonald began his NHL broadcasting career in 1967, as the original voice of the expansion Los Angeles Kings. Initially, the Kings considered pairing him with a then-unknown Al Michaels. Although "Jiggs" (from the Bringing Up Father cartoon strip) had been McDonald's childhood nickname, he had never used it professionally, nor at all among those he'd come to know after becoming an adult, instead going by "Ken", a shortening of his middle name. However, when he was hired by the Kings, the team's then-owner Jack Kent Cooke demanded that McDonald identify himself to listeners with a nickname that would be more memorable than simply "Ken McDonald". McDonald objected to the use of the nickname, but Cooke was insistent.

After five seasons with the Kings, he joined the Atlanta Flames, also as that team's original announcer, with Bernie Geoffrion serving as his broadcasting partner. The Flames' ownership offered to allow him to drop the "Jiggs" nickname, but he opted to keep it since it was by then well-established as the name by which he was known professionally.

When the Flames moved to Calgary in 1980, he joined the New York Islanders broadcast team as play-by-play announcer, replacing Tim Ryan; former Islanders captain Ed Westfall was the color commentator. He spent 15 seasons as the Islanders' play-by-play man, and the team won three Stanley Cups during the period, and advanced to another Final. Including national work, as well as work for other teams, he called the play-by-play of over 200 NHL playoff games. Although he was not the announcer for the first (1980) Stanley Cup championship team, he hosted the New York Islanders' 25th anniversary celebration in 1996.

In 1988, when the New Jersey Devils eliminated the Islanders from the playoffs, he did play-by-play on New Jersey Devils telecasts, partnering with Peter McNab when Gary Thorne was not available.

In future years, he did play-by-play on Toronto Maple Leafs telecasts and Florida Panthers radio broadcasts. In November 2003, he announced his 3,000th regular season game; his number of games called is thought to be the highest by an NHL announcer. Following the 2003–04 season he retired, but he substituted for Dave Strader when the latter was on NHL on NBC assignments on Panther telecasts during the 2005–06 season. Since the 2006–07 season to 2016–17 season, he has returned to call Islanders games on MSG Network, filling in for Howie Rose (when Rose is on vacation or doing New York Mets games on WOR). With Rose broadcasting the Mets playoffs in 2015, McDonald filled in for the first 3 games of the 2015–2016 season. He returned in 2017 and call the Islanders' and Kings' games, both against the Panthers on January 11, and February 9, respectively. On February 2, 2022, McDonald returned to the Islanders broadcast booth, filling in for regular announcer Brendan Burke, for the Islanders first game against the expansion Seattle Kraken team in the 2021–22 season, and then again on March 10, 2022, against the Columbus Blue Jackets. With his Islanders work in 2022, he has called hockey games across seven decades.

He also did broadcasts on nationally televised NHL games for numerous networks. Notably, he called games for SportsChannel America for five years, during which the channel was the rights-holder for national NHL telecasts with Westfall, Herb Brooks, Peter McNab, or John Davidson. He also broadcast a Super Series event between the Soviet Red Army @ the Buffalo Sabres on January 9, 1989 and the 40th National Hockey League All-Star Game on February 7, 1989 with Scotty Bowman doing the color commentary for both games. In addition, he broadcast three Winter Olympics for ABC and TNT and Fox from 1995 to 1999.

In addition, he filled in for Florida Panthers radio play-by-play man Randy Moller for three games when Moller became ill in January 2010.

He returned in 2017 and called the Islanders' and Kings' games, both against the Panthers on January 11, and February 9, respectively.

=== Non-hockey related broadcasting ===
Outside of ice hockey, McDonald served as an announcer for the New York Mets Major League Baseball team in 1982. In 1992, he did play-by-play on CTV for Olympic basketball games. McDonald also worked for WSB-TV in Atlanta as weekend sportscaster from 1973 until 1980.

Preceded by Mike Emrick	Stanley Cup Final American network television play-by-play announcer 1989–1992	Succeeded by Gary Thorne
