= List of St. Louis Blues broadcasters =

Originally, the St. Louis Blues aired their games on KPLR-TV and KMOX radio, with team patron Gus Kyle calling games alongside St Louis broadcasting legend Jack Buck. Buck elected to leave the booth after one season, though, and was replaced by another famed announcer in Dan Kelly. This setup—Kelly as commentator, with either Kyle, Bob Plager, or Noel Picard (whose heavy French-Canadian accent became famous, such as pronouncing owner Sid Salomon III "Sid the Turd" instead of "Third") joining as an analyst, simulcast on KMOX and KPLR—continued through the 1975–76 season, then simulcast on KMOX and KDNL-TV for the next three seasons. KMOX is a 50,000-watt clear-channel station that reaches almost all of North America at night, allowing Kelly to become a celebrity in both the United States and Canada. Indeed, many of the Blues' players liked the fact that their families could hear the games on KMOX.

From 1979 to 1981, the radio and television broadcasts were separated for the first time since the inaugural season, with Kelly doing the radio broadcasts and Eli Gold hired to do the television. Following the 1980–81 season, the television broadcasts moved from KDNL to NBC affiliate KSD-TV for the 1981–82 season, produced by Sports Network Incorporated (SNI), owned and operated by Greg Maracek who did the broadcasts with Channel 5 sportscaster Ron Jacober. The broadcasts failed to produce a profit and then returned to KPLR for the 1982 NHL playoffs and the 1982–83 season before returning to KDNL (currently St. Louis' ABC affiliate) for the 1983–84 season, the first under the ownership of Harry Ornest. The Blues skated back to KPLR 3 years later.

In 1985, Ornest, wanting more broadcast revenue, put the radio rights up for bid. A new company that had purchased KXOK won the bid for a three-year contract and Kelly moved over from KMOX to do the games on KXOK. However, the station was never financially competitive in the market. Additionally, fans complained they could not hear the station at night (it had to readjust its coverage due to a glut of clear-channels on adjacent frequencies). KXOK backed out of the contract after just 2 years, and the Blues immediately went back to KMOX, who held the rights until 2000. Dan Kelly continued to broadcast the games on both TV and radio, but he was diagnosed in the fall of 1988 with lung cancer and died on February 10, 1989. After his death, Ron Jacober (who had left Channel 5 to be KXOK's sports director in 1985 then left for KMOX in 1987) and John Kelly was hired as the co-radio play-by-play announcer for the rest of the season before Kelly took that role. Meanwhile, Ken Wilson became the TV play-by-play announcer with former Blues' players Joe Micheletti, Bruce Affleck, and Bernie Federko. During this time, from 1989 to 2000, more games began to be aired on Prime Sports Midwest, the forerunner to today's Bally Sports Midwest.

The long-term partnership between KMOX and the Blues had its problems, however, namely during spring when the ever-popular St. Louis Cardinals began their season. Blues games, many of which were crucial to playoff berths, would often be pre-empted for spring training coverage. Angry at having to play "second fiddle", the Blues elected to leave for KTRS in 2000. However, in an ironic twist the Cards purchased a controlling interest in KTRS in 2005, and once again preferred to air preseason baseball over regular season hockey. In response, the Blues moved back to KMOX starting in the 2006–07 season. The season of 2008–09 saw the Blues play their last game on KPLR, which had the rights since the 1986–87 season (except for the 1996–97 season on CBS affiliate KMOV), electing to move all their games to FS Midwest, starting with the 2009–10 season. The Cardinals moved back to KMOX in the 2011 season, with conflicting games moved to KYKY, an FM station owned by the same group as KMOX.

Since the 2019–20 preseason, WXOS (101ESPN) has been the flagship radio station for the Blues. Chris Kerber and Joey Vitale are the current radio/TV simulcast team, along with Andy Strickland, Scott Warmann, Bernie Federko, Chris Pronger, and Jamie Rivers.

== Radio ==
| Years | Play-by-play | Color commentator(s) |
|---|---|---|
| 1967–68 | Jack Buck | Gus Kyle |
| 1968–73, 1975–83 | Dan Kelly | Gus Kyle |
| 1973–75 | Dan Kelly | Noel Picard |
| 1983–84 | Dan Kelly | Bill Wilkerson |
| 1984–85 | Dan Kelly (1st and 3rd periods); Ken Wilson (2nd period) | Ken Wilson (1st and 3rd periods); Dan Kelly (2nd period) |
| 1985–87 | Dan Kelly (1st and 3rd periods; primary); Ken Wilson (2nd period; entire game during Kelly's ESPN/CTV/Canwest-Global assignments) | Ken Wilson (1st and 3rd periods); Dan Kelly (2nd period); Joe Micheletti |
| 1987–89 | Dan Kelly (1st and 3rd periods; primary before becoming ill); Ken Wilson (2nd period; lead announcer after Kelly became ill); Ron Jacober (select games after Kelly became ill) | Ken Wilson (1st and 3rd periods); Dan Kelly (2nd period); Bruce Affleck |
| 1989–92 | Ken Wilson (1st and 3rd periods); John Kelly (2nd period) | John Kelly (1st and 3rd periods); Ken Wilson (2nd period); Bruce Affleck |
| 1992–96 | Ken Wilson | Ron Jacober |
| 1996–97 | Ron Jacober | Bernie Federko |
| 1997–2000 | Dan P. Kelly | Bernie Federko |
| 2000–18 | Chris Kerber | Kelly Chase |
| 2018–present | Chris Kerber | Joe Vitale |

=== Fill-ins ===
==== Play-by-play ====
| Years | Play-by-play |
|---|---|
| 1968–69 | Hal Kelly |
| 1969–70 | Hal Kelly and Jim White |
| 1970–71 | Gus Kyle and Jack Buck |
| 1971–72, 1974–78, 1981–83 | Gus Kyle |
| 1972–73 | Gus Kyle and Roy Storey |
| 1973–74 | Jim White and Gus Kyle |
| 1978-79 | Eli Gold and Bob Starr |
| 1983–84 | Bill Wilkerson |
| 1984–85 | Ron Oakes |
| 1985–89, 1996–97 | Ron Jacober |
| 1987–89 | John Kelly |
| 1992–93 | Dave Strader and Paul Romanuk |
| 1993–94 | JP Dellacamera and Ron Jacober |
| 1994–95 | JP Dellacamera and Bob Miller |
| 1995–96 | JP Dellacamera |

==== Color commentary ====
| Years | Color commentator(s) |
|---|---|
| 1968–69 | Dave Martin |
| 1974–75 | E. J. Holub |
| 1975–76 | Jim Heard |
| 1976–77 | Rick Francis |
| 1978–79 | Red Berenson and Bob Starr |
| 1981–84 | Gary Green |
| 1983–84 | Dan Dierdorf and Jim Holder |
| 1984–85 | Dan Dierdorf |
| 1990–94 | Bruce Affleck |
| 1993–95 | Ron Jacober, Rick Meagher, and Joe Micheletti |
| 1995–98 | Rob Ramage |
| 1999–2000 | Bob Hess, Kelly Chase, and Mike Zuke |
| 2002–03 | Pat Jablonski |

=== Notes ===
- During the 1968 playoffs, games were sent to WIBV for the entire playoffs except game 4 of the Stanley Cup Finals. However, there was an ad for one game saying that KMOX would join the Blues game in the third period. KMOX however, did not even air playoff games on days when the Cardinals did not play. On April 13, game 5 of the Flyers series was played in Philadelphia and could have been televised in St. Louis. However, Jay Randolph was covering the Masters golf tournament for CBS-TV, so was unavailable to broadcast that game on television.
- In 1988–89, during Dan Kelly's illness and eventual death, there were many different combinations used. One game, KPLR used a split feed because Ken Wilson and John Kelly were not available, and they did not want Ron Jacober on a TV game. Consequently, Rich Gould did the play-by-play for at least one game with Bruce Affleck.

== Television ==
| Years | Play-by-play | Color commentator(s) |
|---|---|---|
| 1967–68 | Jay Randolph | Bob Ingham |
| 1968–70 | Dan Kelly | Hal Kelly |
| 1970–73, 1975–83 | Dan Kelly | Gus Kyle |
| 1973–75 | Dan Kelly | Noel Picard |
| 1983–84 | Dan Kelly | Ron Oakes |
| 1984–85 | Dan Kelly (1st and 3rd periods); Ken Wilson (2nd period) | Ken Wilson (1st and 3rd periods); Dan Kelly (2nd period) |
| 1985–87 | Dan Kelly (1st and 3rd periods; primary); Ken Wilson (2nd period; entire game during Kelly's ESPN/CTV/Canwest-Global assignments) | Ken Wilson (1st and 3rd periods); Dan Kelly (2nd period); Joe Micheletti |
| 1987–89 | Dan Kelly (1st and 3rd periods; primary before becoming ill); Ken Wilson (2nd period; lead announcer after Kelly became ill); Ron Jacober (select games after Kelly became ill) | Ken Wilson (1st and 3rd periods); Dan Kelly (2nd period); Bruce Affleck |
| 1989–92 | Ken Wilson (1st and 3rd periods); John Kelly (2nd period) | John Kelly (1st and 3rd periods); Ken Wilson (2nd period); Bruce Affleck |
| 1992–98 | Ken Wilson | Joe Micheletti |
| 1998–2000 | Ken Wilson | Bruce Affleck |
| 2000–04 | Ken Wilson | Bernie Federko |
| 2005–09 | John Kelly | Bernie Federko |
| 2009–2023 | John Kelly | Darren Pang (primary); Bernie Federko (rinkside on select games); Jamie Rivers (rinkside on select games) |
| 2023–2025 | John Kelly | Jamie Rivers |
| 2025–present | Chris Kerber | Joey Vitale |

=== Notes ===
- In 1967–68, KPLR did 11 TV games, 1 home and 10 away. On KMOX radio, Jack Buck did play-by-play, but between NFL football, some illness, and then leaving for Cardinals spring training, he missed quite a few games, being replaced by Jay Randolph, Gus Kyle (working alone), Stu Nahan and Gene Hart.
- The 1968–69 and 1969–70 simulcasts were unusual in the sense that while Dan Kelly's play-by-play was on both, Gus Kyle's comments were on KMOX only, and Hal Kelly did TV color (in addition to filling in for his brother on play-by-play on occasion).
- Noel Picard was the lead radio/TV color commentator in 1973–74 and 1974–75, with Kyle returning in 1975–76; while Picard was the analyst, Kyle filled-in as play-by-play when needed.
- Eli Gold did a separate TV feed in 1979–80 and mostly did games by himself but did have some injured players serve as analysts when available. The year before, the Blues still had a simulcast when games were on KDNL-TV. But with those games, only Dan Kelly's voice was heard. Kent Westling talked with Dan Kelly on camera before the game and during the intermission but was not heard on the radio. There were a few times when Kelly was "on assignment", and there was a separate TV feed with Westling doing the play-by-play and Bob Plager serving as color commentator. The 1978–79 season was one of two seasons (1984–85 being the other) where there were no set analysts on broadcasts. Once Ken Wilson arrived on the scene, Kelly and Ken Wilson were the team for TV games.
