= NHL on television in the 1990s =

After Wayne Gretzky was traded to the Los Angeles Kings in 1988, CBC began showing occasional double-headers when Canadian teams visited Los Angeles to showcase the sport's most popular player. These games were often joined in progress, as the regular start time for Hockey Night in Canada was still 8 p.m. Eastern Time and the Kings home games began at 7:30 p.m. Pacific Time (10:30 Eastern). Beginning in the 1995 season, weekly double-headers became permanent, with games starting at 7:30 Eastern and 7:30 Pacific, respectively. In 1998, the start times were moved ahead to 7 p.m. ET and PT.

Until the 1990s, there was only one game televised on HNIC each Saturday night in any particular locality and up to 1968, regular season games were still not broadcast in their entirety. In the 1950s, the HNIC telecast followed the lead of the radio broadcast by coming on the air at 9 p.m. ET, with the game typically being joined in progress either just prior to the start of or during the early portion of the second period.

ESPN replaced SportsChannel America as the NHL's U.S. national rightsholder for the 1992–93 season. ESPN then entered into a time-buy agreement with ABC from the 1992–1993 season to the 1993–1994 season, allowing its sister broadcast network to air six regular season weekly regional telecasts and playoff games during the first three Sundays of the postseason. In 1994, Fox agreed to a contract for broadcast television rights, beginning with the 1994–95 season. Fox's deal was significant because it was the first time in at least 17 years that a broadcast network was willing to commit to a large number of regular season and playoff games, as well as selected games in the Stanley Cup Final. ESPN continued to air games on cable, but Fox's agreement effectively ending ABC's time-buy deal. In 1999, the league signed new contracts with ABC and ESPN, ending Fox's tenure.

== Year-by-year breakdown ==
=== 1990 ===
From 1990 through 1994, NBC only televised the All Star Game. NBC reportedly wanted to test the appeal of hockey, having recently lost the Major League Baseball package to CBS. Shortly thereafter however, NBC gained the broadcast television rights to the National Basketball Association (NBA) from CBS, thus there was a bit of a notion that NBC no longer really needed hockey.

Marv Albert, and John Davidson called the action, while Mike Emrick served as an ice-level reporter in 1990. Meanwhile, Bill Clement served as an ice-level reporter in 1991, 1992 and 1994. Also, Hockey Night in Canada's Ron MacLean helped out with NBC's coverage of the 1993 All-Star Game, as would Jim Gray for the 1994 All-Star Game.

The Montreal Canadiens were slated to host the 1990 All-Star Game, but the team withdrew their bid to considerations due to the superb hosting by Quebec City of Rendez-vous '87. This had allowed the Pittsburgh Penguins, which wanted to host an All-Star Game in 1993, to move up three years early. For its part, Pittsburgh's organizers added much more to previous games, creating the first "true" All-Star weekend. Firstly was the addition of the Heroes of Hockey game, a two-period oldtimers' game between past NHL greats. The second was the addition of the National Hockey League All-Star Skills Competition, a competition between the players invited to the All-Star Game. The Skills competition was created by Paul Palmer, who adapted the Showdown feature seen on Hockey Night in Canada from 1972–73 to 1979–80. All-Star players would be rewarded with US$2,500 for any win in the skills competition.

To accommodate the altered activities, the game itself was played on a Sunday afternoon instead of Tuesday night, as was the case in previous years. This allowed NBC to air the game live across the United States – marking (surprisingly) the first time that a national audience would see Wayne Gretzky and Mario Lemieux play. Referees and other officials were also wired with microphones in this game, as were the two head coaches. Finally, NBC was also allowed to conduct interviews with players during stoppages in play, to the chagrin of the Hockey Night in Canada crew, whose attempts to do likewise were repeatedly denied by the league in previous years.

=== 1991 ===
In 1991, NBC broke away from the telecast in the third period to televise a briefing from The Pentagon involving the Gulf War. SportsChannel America included the missing coverage in a replay of NBC's telecast (NBC owned 50% of Rainbow Enterprises, the parent of SportsChannel America).

=== 1992 ===
Unfortunately, SportsChannel America was only available in a few major markets, and reached only a 1/3 of the households that ESPN did at the time. SportsChannel America was seen in fewer than 10 million households. In comparison, by the 1991–92 season, ESPN was available in 60.5 million homes whereas SportsChannel America was available in only 25 million. As a matter of fact, in the first year of the deal (1988–89), SportsChannel America was available in only 7 million homes when compared to ESPN's reach of 50 million. When the SportsChannel deal ended in 1992, the league returned to ESPN for another contract that would pay US$80 million over five years.

Shortly after the ESPN deal was signed, SportsChannel America would contend that its contract with the NHL gave them the right to match third-party offers for television rights for the 1992–93 season. SportsChannel America accused the NHL of violating a nonbinding clause. SportsChannel America argued that it had been deprived of its contractual right of first refusal for the 1992–93 season. Appellate Division of New York State Supreme Court Justice Shirley Fingerwood would deny SportsChannel America's request for an injunction against the NHL. Upholding that opinion, the appellate court found the agreement on which SportsChannel based its argument to be "too imprecise and ambiguous" and ruled that SportsChannel failed to show irreparable harm.

=== 1993 ===
From its debut in 1992 until the 2001–02 NHL season, weekly regular-season games were broadcast on Sundays (between NFL and baseball seasons), Wednesdays, and Fridays, and were titled Sunday/Wednesday/Friday Night Hockey. Prior to 1999, these telecasts were non-exclusive, meaning they were blacked out in the regions of the competing teams, and an alternate game was shown in these affected areas. Beginning in 1999–2000 season, ESPN was permitted two exclusive telecasts per team per season. When ESPN started broadcasting NBA games on Wednesday and Friday nights in 2002, the weekly hockey broadcasts were moved to Thursday, and the broadcasts renamed to Thursday Night Hockey.

There were reports about NBC making an arrangement to air four to eight regular season games for the 1992–93 season but nothing materialized. NHL officials had arranged a four- to eight-game, time-buy package on NBC, but that fell through when the NHL wanted assurance that all NBC affiliates would carry the games (since 2006, NBC has generally gotten all but a couple of affiliates in the Top-50 markets to carry the games). For instance, in 1990, NBC's affiliates in Atlanta (NBC's coverage of the 1992 All-Star Game aired on the independent station WTLK in that market), Charlotte, Memphis, New Orleans, Indianapolis and Phoenix did not clear the game (Atlanta and Phoenix would eventually receive NHL teams, however the Atlanta franchise relocated to Winnipeg in 2011). Ultimately, roughly 15% of the nation did not have access to the game.

In the 1992–93 season, ABC televised five weekly playoff telecasts (the first three weeks were regional coverage of various games and two national games) on Sunday afternoons starting on April 18 and ending on May 16. This marked the first time that playoff National Hockey League games were broadcast on American network television since 1975 (when NBC was the NHL's American broadcast television partner).

In the 1993–94 season, ABC televised six weekly regional telecasts on the last three Sunday afternoons beginning on March 27, 1994, marking the first time that regular season National Hockey League games were broadcast on American network television since NBC did it in 1974–75. ABC then televised three weeks worth of playoff games on first three Sundays – the final game was game one of the Eastern Conference Semifinals between the Boston Bruins and the New Jersey Devils, a game that was aired nationally. The network did not televise the Stanley Cup Final, which instead, were televised nationally by ESPN and by Prime Ticket in Los Angeles (1993) and MSG Network in New York (1994). Games televised on ABC were not subject to blackout.

These broadcasts (just as was the case with the 1999–2004 package) were essentially, time-buys by ESPN. In other words, ABC would sell three-hour blocks of airtime to ESPN, which in return, would produce, supply broadcasters and sell advertising. Also as evidence by ABC's Raycom produced college basketball package around the same time period, this arrangement could also be interpreted as a way to avoid union contracts, which require that 100% of network shows had to use crew staff who were network union members. The main difference is that the graphics used for the telecasts were those used by ABC Sports, instead of the ones seen on ESPN National Hockey Night. In later years, the roles would be reversed as ESPN's graphical style would be used on the broadcasts with the exception of intermission reports. ABC even used ESPN's theme music for the 1992–1994 coverage. During ABC's next stint with the NHL, the network used its own theme music.

Overall, ABC averaged a 1.7 rating for those two seasons.

=== 1994 ===
Beginning in 1993–94, up to five games per week were also shown on ESPN2 (dubbed "Fire on Ice").

During the Stanley Cup playoffs, ESPN and ESPN2 provided almost nightly coverage, often carrying games on both channels concurrently. Games in the first two rounds were non-exclusive, while telecasts in the Conference Finals and Finals were exclusive (except in 1993 and 1994).

When the NHL television contract went up for negotiation in early 1994, Fox (which was in the process of launching its sports division after acquiring the rights to the National Football Conference of the NFL) and CBS (which was hoping to land a major sports contract to replace the NFL rights that they lost to Fox and Major League Baseball rights that they lost to ABC and NBC) competed heavily for the package. On September 9, 1994, the National Hockey League reached a five-year, US$155 million contract with Fox for the broadcast television rights to the league's games, beginning with the 1994–95 season, effectively ending ABC's time-buy deal with ESPN after just two seasons.

On the heels of its surprise acquisition of the television rights to the National Football League in December 1993, Fox sought deals with other major sports leagues to expand its newly created sports division, opting to go after the rights to broadcast National Hockey League (NHL) games. CBS, which had just lost its NFL package (which primarily included the rights to regular season and playoff games from the National Football Conference) to Fox, was the network's primary competitor for the NHL package, hoping to replace some of the sports programming it had lost to the upstart network.

Nevertheless, in a serious blow to the elder network, Fox outbid CBS for the NHL package as well. On September 9, 1994, the National Hockey League reached a five-year contract with Fox for the broadcast television rights to the league's games, beginning with the 1994–95 season. The network paid $155,000,000 ($31,000,000 annually) to televise NHL regular season and postseason games, considerably less than the $1,580,000,000 Fox paid for the NFL television rights.

The NHL's initial deal with Fox was significant, as a U.S. network television contract was long thought unattainable for the league during the presidency of John Ziegler. For 17 years after the 1975 Finals were broadcast on NBC, there would be no national over-the-air network coverage of the NHL in the United States (except for the 1979 Challenge Cup and game six of the 1980 Stanley Cup Final on CBS, and NBC's coverage of the NHL All-Star Game from 1990 to 1994) and only spotty coverage on regional networks. This was due to the fact that no network was willing to commit to carrying a large number of games, in turn providing low ratings for NHL telecasts. ABC would eventually resume the network broadcasting of regular NHL games (on a time buy basis through ESPN) for the 1992–93 season. This continued through the 1993–94 season, before Fox took over for the next five seasons.

=== 1995 ===
Fox inaugurated its NHL coverage on April 2, 1995, towards the end of the 1994–95 regular season, with six games (between the New York Rangers and Philadelphia Flyers; St. Louis Blues and Detroit Red Wings; Boston Bruins and Washington Capitals; Chicago Blackhawks and Dallas Stars; Florida Panthers and Tampa Bay Lightning; and the San Jose Sharks and Anaheim Ducks). Mike Emrick and John Davidson were the lead broadcast team. Joe Micheletti served as the reporter for national game broadcasts on Fox, while regionally-distributed games were handled by a variety of announcers, in addition to Emrick and Davidson. For the first four years of the deal, James Brown hosted the show and Dave Maloney was the studio analyst from the Fox Network Center studios in Los Angeles. For the fifth and final season, Suzy Kolber served as the studio host and Terry Crisp served as the studio analyst. Occasionally, active NHL players such as Mike Modano would serve as guest analysts.

Fox split coverage of the Stanley Cup Finals with ESPN. Game one of the 1995 Stanley Cup Final was the first Finals game shown on network television since 1980 and the first in prime time since 1973. Games one, five, and seven were usually scheduled to be televised by Fox; and games two, three, four, and six were set to air on ESPN. However, from 1995 to 1998, the Finals matches were all four game sweeps; the 1999 Finals ended in six games. The consequence was that – except for 1995, when Fox did televise game four – the decisive game seven was never shown on network television. Perhaps in recognition of this, games three through seven were always televised by ABC in the succeeding broadcast agreement between the NHL and ABC Sports/ESPN.

Game four of the 1995 Final was notable because not only did the New Jersey Devils win the Stanley Cup, but also the team's main television play-by-play announcer, Mike Emrick, announced it.

KTVU, the Fox affiliate in the San Francisco Bay Area, dropped game four of the 1995 Stanley Cup Final (June 24) for a San Francisco Giants game. The game between the Giants and Florida Marlins in Miami had a long rain-delay. This allowed for KTVU to broadcast the hockey game after-all. However, the baseball game finally started before the hockey game ended. KTVU got a lot of complaints, so they re-aired the end of the hockey game the following Saturday.

=== 1997 ===
Don Cherry missed the entire series due to family illness. On Sunday, June 1, his wife, Pennsylvania native Rose, died from liver cancer. Consequently, Ron MacLean did not host games two and three as he was attending Rose's funeral. Scott Russell sat in for him, and Chris Cuthbert took over Russell's reporting role.

=== 1998 ===
TSN owned the national cable rights to the NHL in Canada from 1987 through 1998, after which what was then called CTV Sportsnet purchased the national cable rights to NHL games. Prior to this, TSN's NHL coverage was sparse as they only acquired games a la carte. From 1987–88 to 1997–98, they usually showed games twice per week through the regular season and in the first round of the playoffs they provided extensive coverage of series not involving Canadian-based teams. TSN was the first ever holder of cable rights to the NHL in Canada, although the task of acquiring these rights were complicated by contradicting statements by CBC that it did own the cable rights to the NHL, along with the involvement of competing beer company Molson in Canadian NHL rights at the time (TSN was founded by its competitor, Labatt). With the help of a Molson employee who was a friend of TSN's founder Gordon Craig, a deal was reached between TSN, Molson, and the NHL.

In August 1998, ABC, ESPN and ESPN2 signed a five-year television deal with the NHL, worth a total of approximately US$600 million (or $120 million per year). The $120 million per year that ABC and ESPN paid for rights dwarfed the $5.5 million that the NHL received from American national broadcasts in the 1991–92 season. As previously mentioned, as was the case with the 1992–1994 deal, ABC's subsequent NHL coverage was in reality, made up of time–buys from ESPN. This was noted in copyright beds after the telecasts, i.e. "The preceding program has been paid for by ESPN, Inc." ESPN then signed a similar television rights contract in 2002 so it could produce and broadcast National Basketball Association games on ABC.

ABC also televised the National Hockey League All-Star Game and Games 3–7 of the Stanley Cup Finals in prime time. In the league's previous broadcast television deal with Fox, the network split coverage of the Stanley Cup Finals with ESPN. Games one, five, andseven were usually scheduled to be televised by Fox; games two, three, four, and six by ESPN. However, from 1995 to 1998, the Finals were all four-game sweeps; 1999 ended in six games. The consequence was that – except for 1995 when Fox did televise game four – the decisive game was never on network television.

From 1998–99 until 2001–02, Sportsnet aired Labatt Blue Tuesday Night Hockey weekly during the regular season, and covered first-round playoff series that did not feature Canadian teams. The network's first live event was an opening night match between the Philadelphia Flyers and New York Rangers. Jim Hughson and Craig Simpson served as the lead broadcast team while Kevin Quinn and Ryan Walter served as the secondary team. Darren Dreger as the studio host and was joined by other personalities such as Greg Millen (1998–1999), Nick Kypreos (1998–2002), and Mike Keenan (1999–2000).

=== 1999 ===
Things ended badly between Fox and the league in 1999, when the NHL announced a new television deal with ESPN that also called for sister broadcast network ABC to become the new network television partner (as previously mentioned). Fox challenged that it had not been given a chance to match the network component of the deal, but ABC ultimately prevailed.

TSN began airing Toronto Maple Leafs games regionally, presented by Molson as Molson Canadian Leafs Hockey, in the 1998–99 season, when they first lost the national contract. The package was originally for 30 games, but reduced to 17 once TSN re-acquired the national rights in 2002. Ten of those games were ones that TSN acquired from the NHL to air nationally. The other seven, TSN acquired from the Maple Leafs as regional games. However, TSN eventually came to an agreement with the other five Canadian clubs to air these games nationally. Play-by-play announcer Joe Bowen and color commentator Harry Neale originally handled commentary for regional Leafs games. The deal expired at the conclusion of the 2006–07 season and from the 2007–08 season through 2013–14, every Maple Leafs game on TSN was broadcast as a national NHL on TSN game.
