= Joe Buck =

American sportscaster (born 1969)

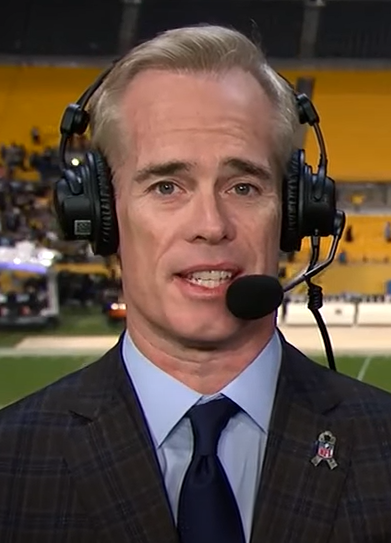
- Buck in 2018
- Born: Joseph Francis Buck; April 25, 1969 (age 57); St. Petersburg, Florida, U.S.
- Education: Indiana University Bloomington
- Occupation: Sportscaster
- Years active: 1989–present
- Spouses: Ann Archambault (m. 1993; div. 2011); Michelle Beisner (m. 2014)
- Children: 4
- Parent: Jack Buck (father)
- Awards: Pete Rozelle Radio-Television Award (2020); Ford C. Frick Award (2026)
- Sports commentary career
- Genre: Play-by-play
- Sports: NFL, MLB, USGA
- Employer: Fox Sports (1994–2021); ESPN/ABC (2022–present)

Joseph Francis Buck (born April 25, 1969) is an American sportscaster and actor who serves as the lead play-by-play announcer for Monday Night Football on ESPN and ABC. He also hosts ESPN Jeopardy! on Disney+, Hulu and ESPN. Buck previously worked for Fox Sports from its 1994 inception through 2022, serving as the lead play-by-play announcer for Fox's National Football League and Major League Baseball coverage.

Buck has called the Super Bowl six times, and the World Series 23 times. He is known for his distinctively smooth and focused style of play-calling, and is a member of the Sports Broadcasting Hall of Fame, as is his father, Jack Buck. He has been honored with the 2020 Pete Rozelle Radio-Television Award from the Pro Football Hall of Fame and the 2026 Ford C. Frick Award from the National Baseball Hall of Fame. He is considered one of the most recognizable sportscasters in history.

== Early life and education ==
Buck was born in St. Petersburg, Florida and raised in the St. Louis area, where he attended St. Louis Country Day School. He began his broadcasting career in 1989 while he was an undergraduate at Indiana University Bloomington.

== Career ==
=== Before Fox ===
Buck called play-by-play for the then-Louisville Redbirds, a minor league affiliate of the Cardinals, and was a reporter for ESPN's coverage of the Triple-A All-Star Game in 1989. In 1991, he did reporting for St Louis' CBS affiliate KMOV. Also, in 1991 Buck began broadcasting for the Cardinals on local television and KMOX Radio, filling in while his father was working on CBS telecasts. In the 1992–93 season, he was the play-by-play voice for University of Missouri basketball broadcasts.

Buck continued to call Cardinals games after being hired by Fox Sports, initially with his father on KMOX and later on FSN Midwest television. As his network duties increased, however, his local workload shrank, and before the 2008 season, it was announced that he would no longer be calling Cardinals telecasts for FSN Midwest. This marked the first time since 1960 that a member of the Buck family was not part of the team's broadcasting crew.

=== Fox Sports (1994–2021) ===
==== NFL on Fox ====
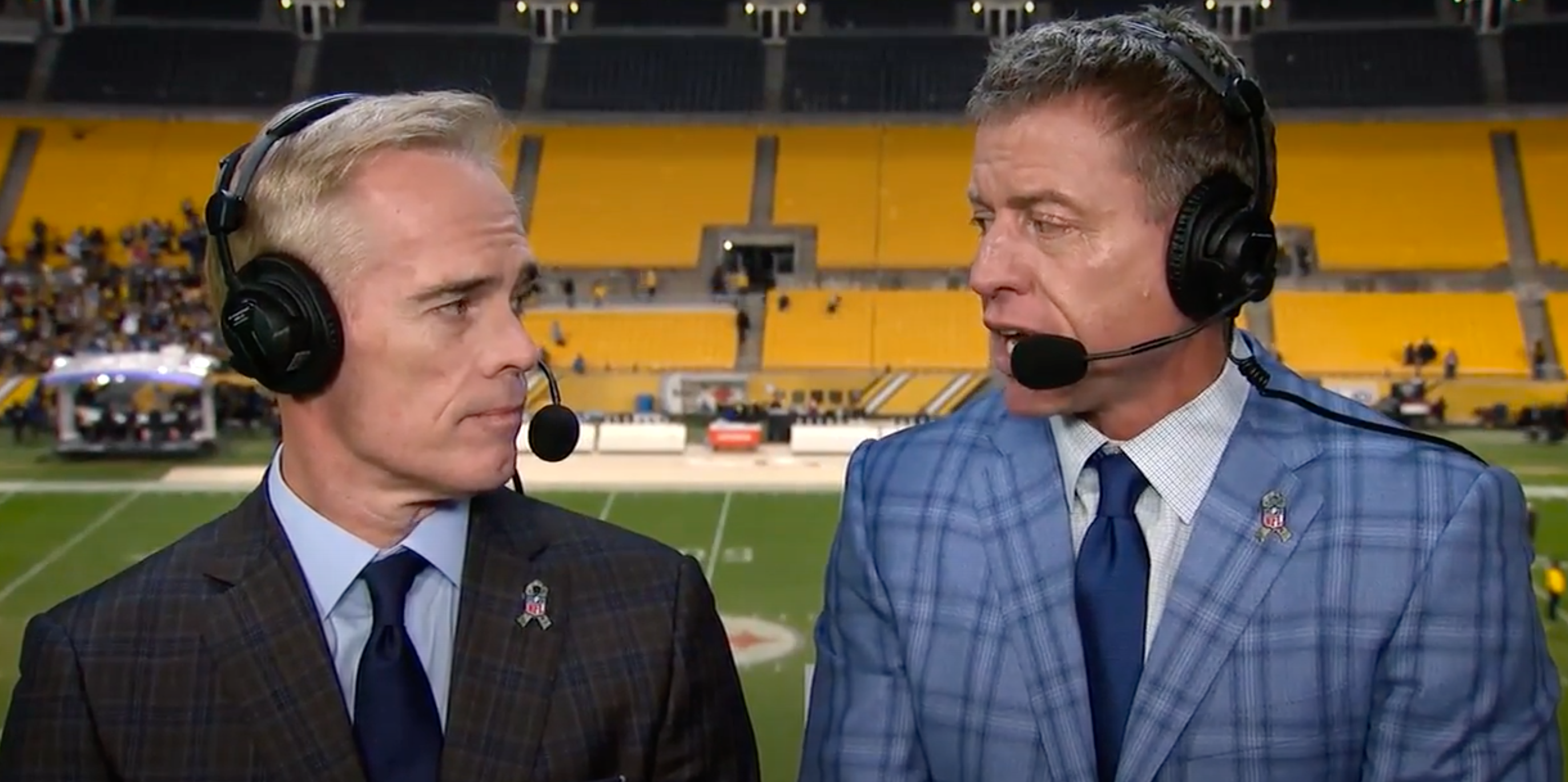
Buck and Troy Aikman in 2018

In 1994, Buck was hired by Fox, and at the age of 25 became the youngest man ever to announce a regular slate of National Football League (NFL) games on network television.

Soon after arriving at Fox, Buck became the play-by-play man on Fox's #4 NFL broadcast team, with Tim Green as his color commentator. After four years, he stopped doing NFL games to concentrate on his baseball duties full-time. During the 2001 season, Buck occasionally filled in for Curt Menefee as Fox's number-six play-by-play man.

Buck became Fox's top play-by-play man in 2002, replacing Pat Summerall. For many seasons, he was teamed with Troy Aikman as color commentator and Erin Andrews as the sideline reporter. (Buck also worked with Cris Collinsworth from 2002 to 2004, before the latter's move to Showtime, NFL Network, and NBC.) Buck is only the third announcer to handle a television network's lead MLB and NFL coverage in the same year (following NBC's Curt Gowdy and ABC's Al Michaels). By 2002, his Fox duties forced him to cut his local Cardinals schedule to 25 games. (Eventually, Buck left the Cardinals altogether to join Fox Sports "full-time" in 2008.) Notable games he called included Super Bowl XLII, Miracle at the New Meadowlands, Super Bowl LI, the Minneapolis Miracle, and the final Green Bay Packers home game in Milwaukee at County Stadium.

During the 2006 season, Buck briefly hosted Fox's pre-game show Fox NFL Sunday, with him and Curt Menefee jointly replacing James Brown. To accommodate his involvement, the show began to broadcast on-site from the location of Fox's top game of the week. In 2007, Buck stepped down as host to focus on his play-by-play duties, and Fox NFL Sunday reverted to primarily being broadcast from Fox Sports' studios in Los Angeles.

In 2014, Buck was named as the new host of NFL Films Presents, to coincide with the program's move from ESPN2 to Fox Sports 1.

==== Major League Baseball on Fox ====
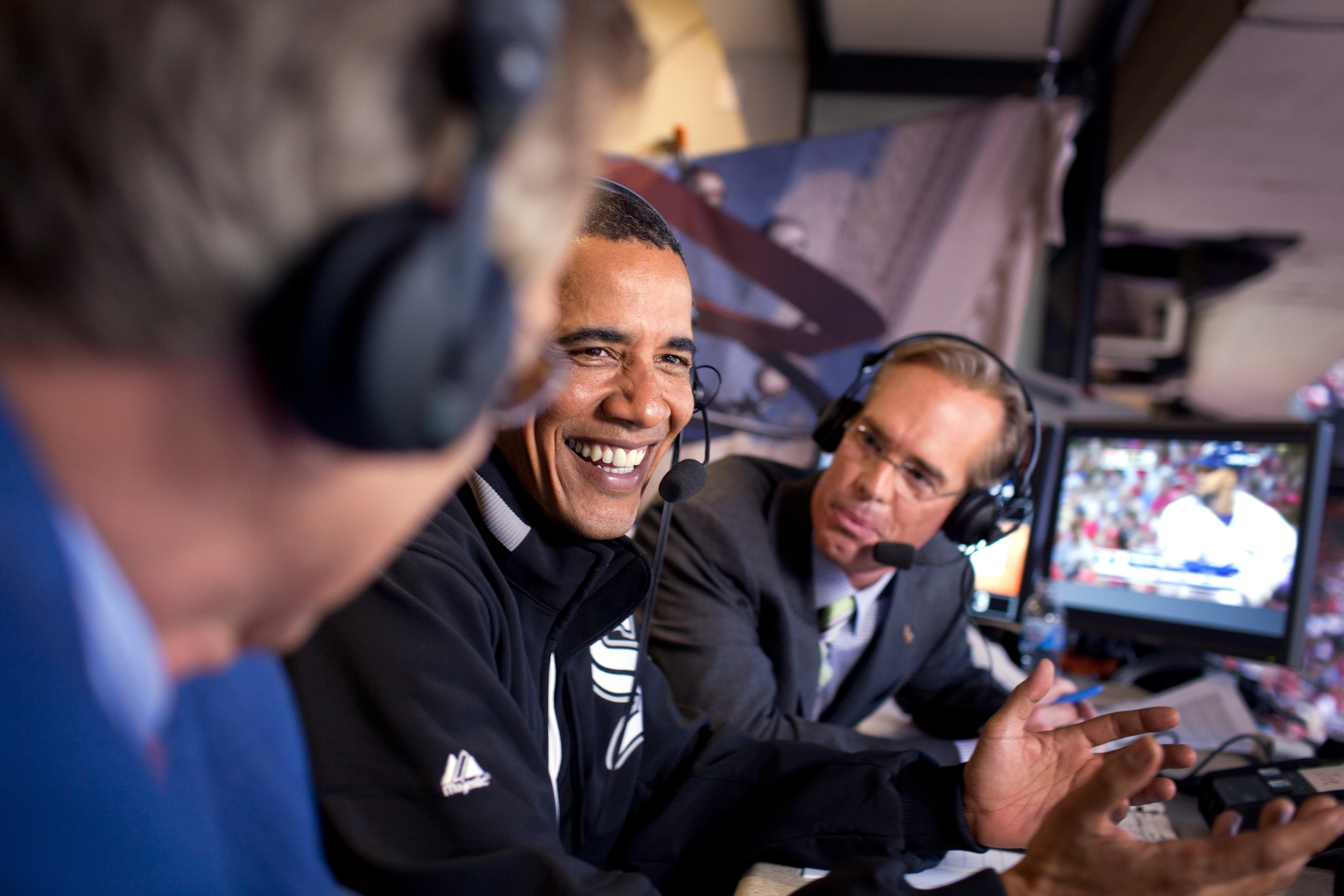
Joe Buck (right) with President Barack Obama and Tim McCarver (left) during the 2009 MLB All-Star Game in St. Louis

In 1996, he was named Fox's lead play-by-play voice for Major League Baseball, teaming with Tim McCarver, who had previously worked with his father on CBS. That year, he became the youngest man to do a national broadcast (for all nine innings and games, as a network employee as opposed to simply being a representative of one of the participating teams) for a World Series, surpassing Sean McDonough, who called the 1992 World Series for CBS at the age of 30. McDonough had replaced Jack Buck as CBS's lead baseball play-by-play man after he was fired in late 1991.

Later with Fox, Buck called a limited selection of regular-season games each year (typically featuring big-market teams such as the Yankees, Red Sox, Dodgers, Cardinals in which he called games for, and/or Cubs), as well as the All-Star Game, one of the League Championship Series, and the World Series. From 2016 to 2021, he was paired with color analyst John Smoltz and field reporter Ken Rosenthal. Besides working with Tim McCarver for 18 seasons (1996–2013), Buck also worked with former MLB player and current MLB Network/Fox Sports analyst Harold Reynolds and baseball insider Tom Verducci for 2 seasons (2014–2015). About a month or two after the 2015 World Series, Reynolds and Verducci were demoted to the #2 team and John Smoltz moved up from the #2 team (with Matt Vasgersian) to take Reynolds and Verducci's places.

Between 1996 and 2021, Buck called 24 World Series and 22 All-Star Games for Fox, the most of any play-by-play announcer on network television.

As the lead play-by-play announcer for MLB on Fox, Buck called games between the Boston Red Sox and New York Yankees that were broadcast on Fox and FS1. He called many notable moments in the rivalry, including Aaron Boone's walk off home run in Game 7 of the 2003 ALCS, saying "The Boston Red Sox...were five outs away in the eighth inning, leading by three, as Boone hits it to deep left. That might send the Yankees to the World Series. Boone the hero of Game 7!" and the Red Sox historic comeback the following year, calling "This would be the fifth pennant for the Red Sox...since that 1918 season, here it is, ground ball to second, Reese, the Boston Red Sox...have won the pennant."

Buck's voice is heard in recorded conversations between Linda Tripp and Monica Lewinsky calling Game 5 of the Yankees-Indians ALDS in 1997, which were released at the height of the scandal involving Lewinsky and President Bill Clinton.

On September 8, 1998, Buck called Mark McGwire's 62nd home run that broke Roger Maris' single-season record. The game was nationally televised live in prime time on Fox. It was a rarity for a nationally televised regular season game not to be aired on cable since the end of the Monday/Thursday Night Baseball era on ABC in 1989.

During Fox's broadcast of the 2002 World Series, Buck paid tribute to his father, who had died a few months earlier, by calling the final out of Game 6 with the phrase, "We'll see you tomorrow night." This was the same phrase with which Jack Buck had famously called Kirby Puckett's home run off Braves pitcher Charlie Leibrandt, which ended Game 6 of the 1991 World Series. Since then, Buck has continued to use this phrase, including Game 4 of the 2004 ALCS when David Ortiz's walk-off home run finally won it for the Red Sox in the 12th inning, Buck altered the phrase to, "We'll see you later tonight," as the game had extended into the early morning of the next day. Most famously, he also used the phrase at the end of Game 6 of the 2011 World Series when the Cardinals' David Freese hit a walk-off home run in the 11th inning against the Rangers to send the series to a seventh game. Buck's repeated use of the phrase caused controversy with some commentators opining that it had been turned into a cliché, at the expense of the original iconic moment associated with the Minnesota Twins.

Buck also paid tribute to his late father during the 2006 World Series by calling the final out of Game 5 with the phrase "St. Louis has a World Series winner", which echoed his father's line "And that's a winner, that's a winner, a World Series winner for the Cardinals!" at the end of the 1982 World Series.

Another notable Red Sox game in the ALCS was in 2013, Game 2 against the Detroit Tigers at Fenway Park. The Red Sox were trailing 5–1 in the bottom of the eighth inning, with the bases loaded with David Ortiz at-bat. Ortiz hit a game-tying grand slam off Tigers' closer Joaquín Benoit. His call: "Hard hit into right, back at the wall," and then he calls, "TIE GAME!" as the ball flies over Torii Hunter, who flipped over the outfield wall.

Buck also called the final out of three World Series in which the Red Sox, White Sox, and Cubs ended the longest championship droughts in 2004, 2005, and 2016, respectively. His calls were:

- "Back to Foulke. Red Sox fans have longed to hear it. The Boston Red Sox are world champions."
- "Tying run at second, two out, Palmeiro, over the head of Jenks, Uribe charges, throws, OUT! And the White Sox have won the World Series! Juan Uribe with a play, charging it, throwing it, and the White Sox celebrate, their first title in eighty-eight years!"
- "Here's the 0-1. This is gonna be a tough play, Bryant, the Cubs...WIN THE WORLD SERIES! Bryant makes the play! It's over, and the Cubs have finally won it all! 8-7 in 10!"

==== Two-sport, same-day doubleheader ====
On October 14, 2012, Buck called a doubleheader, first with the New York Giants-San Francisco 49ers game at Candlestick Park at 1:25 p.m. PDT, then traveled via trolley for the seven-mile journey up the west shore of the San Francisco Bay to call Game 1 of the NLCS between the St. Louis Cardinals and the San Francisco Giants at AT&T Park at 5:15 p.m. PDT.

The opportunity presented itself again on October 28, 2018, when Fox would carry the Green Bay Packers and Los Angeles Rams from the Los Angeles Memorial Coliseum as its featured NFL game before Game 5 of the 2018 World Series between the Boston Red Sox and the Los Angeles Dodgers, to be played five miles away at Dodger Stadium. However, Buck chose to concentrate on baseball, citing traffic concerns in Los Angeles and already being busy calling the NFL and MLB simultaneously. Thom Brennaman, who had served as Buck's fill-in during the MLB postseason in the past, handled the Packers-Rams game.

==== Other sports at Fox ====
In the late 1990s, Buck hosted a weekly sports news show, Goin' Deep, for Fox Sports Net cable. He also called horse racing and professional bass fishing events early in his Fox career, as well as the network's first Cotton Bowl Classic telecast in 1999.

On February 12, 2013, Buck made a guest appearance during Fox Sports Midwest's broadcast of a St. Louis Blues hockey game. Alongside their current commentators Darren Pang and John Kelly, he discussed his father Jack Buck having called Blues hockey along with Kelly's father Dan in the late 1960s. Buck briefly took over play-by-play from Pang and Kelly, stepping aside when the Los Angeles Kings inevitably scored a power-play goal on the Blues (joking in response that "I clearly bring no mojo to the party").

In April 2014, it was announced that Buck would team with Greg Norman to anchor Fox's new package of United States Golf Association telecasts, most prominently the U.S. Open tournament. The pair made their broadcast debut at the Franklin Templeton Shootout (an event also hosted by Norman) on December 12–14, 2014. Norman was fired by Fox and replaced with Paul Azinger in 2016.

=== HBO Sports (2009–2010) ===
On February 5, 2009, Buck signed with HBO to host a sports-based talk show for the network called Joe Buck Live, with a format similar to that of Costas Now, the monthly HBO program previously hosted by Bob Costas. The show's debut on June 15, 2009, made national headlines due to the tension-filled banter between Buck and guest Artie Lange, a comedian from The Howard Stern Show, who made several jokes at Buck's expense. Two more episodes aired in 2009. In March 2010, Buck told a St. Louis radio station that HBO might be planning to cancel Joe Buck Live, adding that he "won't miss" the program and that it involved "a lot more effort and hassle than I ever expected". HBO subsequently confirmed the show's cancellation to Broadcasting & Cable.

=== ESPN/ABC (2022–present) ===
On March 16, 2022, ESPN announced that it had signed Buck and Aikman to a multi-year deal with ESPN, which saw them become the new lead broadcast team of Monday Night Football beginning in the 2022 NFL season, and also work on projects for ESPN+. The move ended their 20-season tenure as Fox's lead NFL broadcast team. As compensation for Buck leaving Fox Sports with one year left on his contract, ESPN sublicensed one of its Big Ten college football games for the 2022 season to Fox.

In May 2022, Buck made his on-air debut at ESPN during the 2022 PGA Championship, hosting an alternate broadcast on ESPN2 and ESPN+ produced by Peyton and Eli Manning, featuring ESPN golf analyst Michael Collins and other celebrity guests.

In 2022, Buck was offered to fill in for an ESPN-broadcast MLB game as well, but declined, telling a Sports Illustrated podcast that he was no longer interested in calling baseball, since "I feel like I've done all I could do there. If someday I wanna go back and call a few games—maybe. But I don't have that itch." In 2025, ESPN announced that Buck would call an MLB Opening Day game that season featuring the Milwaukee Brewers and New York Yankees with Joe Girardi and Bill Schroeder.

Buck signed a new contract with ESPN in September 2026, which extended him for six years at a total value of $108 million. At the time, Buck was in the last year of his original ESPN contract. Aikman did not receive a new contract at the same time, and according to reporting by The Athletic, he learned about Buck's extension through the news, and viewed his secretiveness as a betrayal. Buck and Aikman had a verbal fight before the October 12 Monday Night Football match between the Buffalo Bills and Los Angeles Rams, which according to sources with direct knowledge, Buck initiated by saying to Aikman, “You are not going to fucking talk to me?” Aikman and Buck did not show tension on-air during the subsequent Monday Night Football matches.

=== Other sports activities ===
Since 2001, Buck has hosted the "Joe Buck Classic", a celebrity pro-am golf tournament that is played each May to raise money for St. Louis Children's Hospital.

He also contributes occasional opinion pieces to The Sporting News, and is a key contributor on KSLG/Team 1380 on the ITD Morning After program in St. Louis.

From 2015 to 2018, Buck hosted Undeniable with Joe Buck, a sports interview series on Audience Network.

On May 24, 2024, Buck was scheduled to call a Cardinals-Cubs baseball game on Bally Sports Midwest alongside his close friend Chip Caray. It would have marked the first time Buck had called a baseball game since the 2021 World Series. However, the game was rained out. He returned to the booth and called a Cardinals-Rangers game with Chip Caray on July 29, 2024.

=== Other media appearances ===
Buck has appeared in several television programs as himself, including Pitch, American Dad!, Family Guy, Conan, The Tonight Show Starring Jimmy Fallon, and Brockmire; the film Fever Pitch (also starring Jimmy Fallon); and in the "Carpet Brothers" sketch on Funny or Die Presents as The Legit Don Stritt.

In 2007, Buck filmed a pilot episode for a prospective late-night talk and comedy program with former Saturday Night Live writer and director Matt Piedmont. Piedmont and Buck wrote and produced the pilot with Piedmont directing, filming in New York City and Los Angeles, and featuring Molly Shannon, David Spade, and Paul Rudd. Buck co-hosted the program with Abebe Adusmussui, an actual New York City taxi driver. The pilot was not picked up as a series, however.

In the week before calling Super Bowl XLVIII, Buck starred in a sketch web video for Funny or Die, in which he tries to report on the game from New York City, but continues to get interrupted by locals who dislike him.

Andrew Marchand of the New York Post reported on April 17, 2021, that Buck would serve as a guest host on Jeopardy! as the game show continued to search for a replacement after the death of longtime host Alex Trebek. Sony Pictures Television confirmed four days later that Buck's stint would air from August 9 to 13. On April 21, 2026, Buck was announced to host ESPN Jeopardy!, a sports-themed spinoff of the game show.

In 2021, Buck and his family appeared on ABC's Celebrity Family Feud, competing against the family of actor Oliver Hudson.

In 2022, Buck became the announcer on Fox's Domino Masters hosted by Eric Stonestreet. Buck also competed in season seven of The Masked Singer as "Ram" of Team Bad. He was unmasked in the competition's second week at the time when Stonestreet was a guest panelist as he and Robin Thicke correctly guessed Buck during the final guesses.

Buck has also appeared in various national television commercials for such clients as Holiday Inn and Budweiser beer. One of the more memorable spots for the latter had Buck goaded into using the catchphrase, "Slamma-lamma-ding-dong!" A 2008 commercial for National Car Rental had him using the catchphrase, "Now that's a good call". Buck has also done local commercials in the St. Louis market for the Suntrup chain of automobile dealerships.

Buck published an autobiography, Lucky Bastard, in 2016.

== Awards and honors ==
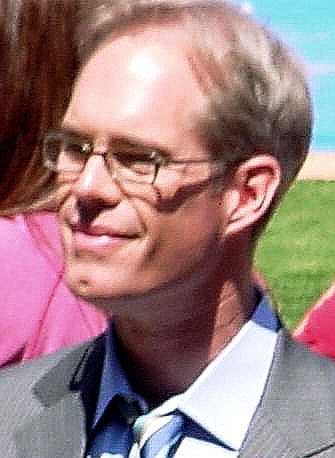
Buck in 2006

- Eight-time Sports Emmy Award winner
  - Seven for Play-by-Play
  - One for Studio Host
- Three-time NSMA National Sportscaster of the Year.
- 2020 Pete Rozelle Radio-Television Award from the Pro Football Hall of Fame (Joe's father Jack Buck won the award in 1996, making him and Joe the first father-son duo to earn the distinction).
- NSMA Hall of Fame inductee (class of 2024)
- 2026 Ford C. Frick Award from the Baseball Hall of Fame (Joe's father Jack Buck won the award in 1987, making him and Joe the first father-son duo to earn the distinction).

== Criticism and controversies ==
Buck is generally regarded as "one of the most heavily criticized" announcers in sports, with various fans complaining that he is biased on his calls towards or against particular teams. Buck attributes this to the fact that most fan bases, especially Major League Baseball fans, are used to hearing local announcers and not those working national broadcasts: "Fans are used to hearing their hometown guys. When you come at it objectively, people aren't used to it."

Reporting from the field following the game in which Mark McGwire broke Roger Maris' single-season home run record in 1998, Buck began his postgame interview on Fox by requesting (and getting) a hug from McGwire, which led to criticisms of Buck's on-air professionalism from some sources.

In January 2005, Buck drew fire for his on-air comments during an NFL playoff game between the Minnesota Vikings and Green Bay Packers. After Vikings wide receiver Randy Moss simulated mooning the Green Bay crowd in the end zone, Buck called it a "disgusting act". The moon was a response to Packers fans, who traditionally moon the Vikings players aboard the team bus, which Buck did not know about. Buck's comment also indicated that he incorrectly believed that Moss had mooned the fans. It prompted Red McCombs, then the owner of the Minnesota Vikings, to request that Buck be removed from covering their upcoming playoff game, saying that Buck's comments "suggested a prejudice that surpassed objective reporting." Buck also received criticism from other members of the media who felt he "over-reacted" and was being "inconsistent" given his network's history of programming. Buck was much more restrained in his call of the New York Jets' Isaiah Crowell using the football to simulate cleaning himself after defecation during a 2018 Thursday Night Football contest against the Cleveland Browns. "That will draw a flag every time," Buck simply commented.

In 2007, Buck was scheduled to call only eight regular-season MLB games out of a 26-game schedule for Fox (along with a handful of regional Cardinals telecasts on FSN Midwest). In an interview with Richard Sandomir of the New York Times, he defended his reduced baseball commitment:

If you or the casual fan doesn't want to consider me the No. 1 baseball announcer at Fox, it's not my concern ... I don't know why it would matter. I don't know who had a more tiresome, wall-to-wall schedule than my father, and I know what it's like to be a kid in that situation ... He was gone a lot. He needed to be. I understood it. So did my mom. Because my career has gone the way it's gone, I don't have to go wall to wall. ...While I'm deathly afraid of overexposure, I'm more afraid of underexposure at home with my wife and girls.

In 2008, Buck drew criticism for comments he made during an appearance on ESPN Radio's The Herd with Colin Cowherd, in which he admitted to spending "barely any" time following sporting events he doesn't broadcast and facetiously claimed that he preferred watching The Bachelorette instead.

In June 2015, Buck announced he had quit his Twitter account. Buck explained that he quit Twitter because he found himself engaging negative people and allowing criticism to affect how he was doing his job. He would return to Twitter four months later to engage in friendly banter with a Kansas City Royals fan who started a petition to have him removed from the Fox broadcast team for the Royals' appearance in the 2015 ALCS.

Also in June 2015, Buck and co-announcer Greg Norman were criticized for their "mistake-filled, error-prone mess" in covering the 2015 U.S. Open in golf. In particular, they were questioned for prematurely anointing Dustin Johnson as the winner "at the start of a back nine".

Before a 2020 NFL broadcast between the Packers and Buccaneers in Tampa, Buck and his partner Troy Aikman were caught on a hot mic questioning the necessity of a military flyover when only 15,000 fans were allowed in Raymond James Stadium for the game. "That's your hard-earned money and your tax dollars at work," Buck commented. An Armed Forces spokesperson later said there is no additional cost to conduct the flyovers. Meanwhile, Buck and Aikman faced accusations of being unpatriotic. Buck said the comments were taken out of context and were sarcasm not meant for broadcast.

On January 2, 2023, Buck served as the announcer for a Monday Night Football game between the Buffalo Bills and Cincinnati Bengals in which Bills safety Damar Hamlin suffered sudden cardiac arrest. Buck claimed four times on the broadcast that despite the life-threatening injury, he had been told the league was adamant to resume play within minutes. The NFL's executive vice president of football operations Troy Vincent denied the claims, saying those plans were never relayed to Buck and called his comments "insensitive". The following day, Buck responded to the NFL and Vincent, and stood by the claim that he was told both teams had five minutes to warm-up before resuming the game. A similar report regarding the players warming-up to resume play was aired on Westwood One.

== Personal life ==
From 1993 to 2011, Buck was married to Ann Archambault, with whom he has two daughters, Natalie and Trudy. He married former NFL Network and now ESPN reporter and former Bronco cheerleader Michelle Beisner on April 12, 2014. They have twin sons, Blake and Wyatt. The couple reside in Denver, Colorado.

Buck is a fan and season ticket holder of the NHL's St. Louis Blues. He revealed in a tweet in 2023 that he was a Houston Oilers fan growing up, and he supports the St. Louis Cardinals in baseball.

=== Vocal cord ailment ===
In 2011, shortly after broadcasting Super Bowl XLV for Fox, Buck claimed to have developed a virus on the nerves of his left vocal fold. Despite the ailment, which according to Buck "came out of the blue" and hampered his ability to raise his voice, he continued to broadcast baseball for Fox during the 2011 season and resumed as Fox's lead NFL announcer that fall.

In 2016, Buck revealed that the problem was not due to a virus, but rather to vocal cord paralysis likely caused by anesthesia used during multiple hair transplantation procedures.
