= NHL on SportsChannel America =

US television program

- Also known as: NHL on SportsChannel; Hockey Night America
- Genre: Sports
- Created by: SportsChannel America
- Directed by: Larry Brown; Billy McCoy (senior director)
- Presented by: Bob Papa; Leandra Reilly; Lee Zeidman
- Starring: See announcers section below
- Country of origin: United States
- Original language: English
- No. of seasons: 4

Production
- Executive producer: Jeff Ruhe
- Producers: John Shannon (senior producer); Mike Connelly
- Cinematography: Terry Ford; Dean Anderson; Bob Boykin; Marty Muzik
- Running time: 180 minutes or until game ends (including commercials)
- Production companies: National Hockey League; NBC Sports

Original release
- Network: SportsChannel America
- Release: October 16, 1988 – June 1, 1992

Related
- NHL on ESPN/NHL on ABC; Hockey Night in Canada; NHL on NBC

The NHL on SportsChannel America was the presentation of National Hockey League broadcasts on the now defunct SportsChannel America cable television network.

== Terms of the deal ==
Taking over for ESPN, SportsChannel's contract paid US$51 million ($17 million per year) over three years, more than double what ESPN had paid ($24 million) for the previous three years SportsChannel America managed to get a fourth NHL season for just $5 million.

The SportsChannel America deal was in a sense, a power play created by Charles Dolan and Bill Wirtz. Dolan was still several years away from getting control of Madison Square Garden, and Wirtz owned 25% of SportsChannel Chicago. NHL president John Ziegler convinced the board of governors that SportsChannel America was a better alternative than a proposed NHL Channel backed by Paramount and Viacom that had interests in the MSG Network and NESN.

=== SportsChannel's availability ===
Unfortunately, SportsChannel America was only available in a few major markets (notably absent though were Detroit, Pittsburgh, and St. Louis) and reached only a 1/3 of the households that ESPN did at the time. SportsChannel America was seen in fewer than 10 million households. In comparison, by the 1991–92 season, ESPN was available in 60.5 million homes whereas SportsChannel America was available in only 25 million. As a matter of fact, in the first year of the deal (1988–89), SportsChannel America was available in only 7 million homes when compared to ESPN's reach of 50 million. When the SportsChannel deal ended in 1992, the league returned to ESPN for another contract that would pay US$80 million over five years.

SportsChannel America took advantage of using their regional sports networks' feed of a game, graphics and all, instead of producing a show from the ground up, most of the time. Distribution of SportsChannel America across the country was limited to cities that had a SportsChannel regional sports network or affiliate. Very few cable systems in non-NHL territories picked it up as a stand-alone service, with many only taking it on a pay-per-view basis during the Stanley Cup Final. In addition to the SportsChannel regional networks, Maryland-based Home Team Sports and Minneapolis-based Midwest Sports Channel (independently owned and operated despite the similar sounding name) carried the games. In 1991, two Prime Sports networks, KBL (Pittsburgh) and Prime Sports Northwest agreed to carry the playoff package, expanding it reach to an additional 2.6 million homes.

==== Philadelphia ====
Since SportsChannel Philadelphia did not air until January 1990, PRISM (owned by Rainbow Media, the owners of SportsChannel, at the time) picked up the 1989 Stanley Cup Final. Other than that, there was no NHL television coverage in Philadelphia except for the Flyers for the first half of the original deal.

=== Lawsuit ===
As previously mentioned, the NHL would return to ESPN following the 1991–92 season. Shortly after the ESPN deal was signed, SportsChannel America would contend that its contract with the NHL gave them the right to match third-party offers for television rights for the 1992–93 season. SportsChannel America accused the NHL of violating a nonbinding clause. SportsChannel America argued that it had been deprived of its contractual right of first refusal for the 1992–93 season. Appellate Division of New York State Supreme Court justice Shirley Fingerwood would deny SportsChannel America's request for an injunction against the NHL. Upholding that opinion, the appellate court found the agreement on which SportsChannel based its argument to be "too imprecise and ambiguous" and ruled that SportsChannel failed to show irreparable harm.

In the aftermath of losing the NHL, SportsChannel America was left with little more than outdoors shows and Canadian Football League games. For SportsChannel, the deal was a disaster overall. While the cable channel three years later, was available in 20 million homes (as previously mentioned), the broadcaster lost as much as $10 million on the agreement, and soon faded into obscurity. Some local SportsChannel stations – which carried NHL games in their local markets – were not affected.

== Coverage overview ==
=== Regular season coverage ===
SportsChannel America televised about 80–100 games a season (whereas ESPN aired about 33 in the 1987–88 season). Whereas the previous deal with ESPN called for only one nationally televised game a week, SportsChannel America televised hockey two nights a week in NHL cities and three nights a week elsewhere.

It was very rare to have a regular-season game on SportsChannel America that wasn't a regional SportsChannel production from the Chicago Blackhawks, Hartford Whalers, New Jersey Devils, New York Islanders, or Philadelphia Flyers. The San Jose Sharks were added in 1991–92. As previously suggested, SportsChannel America for the most part, used the local telecasts. The dedicated SportsChannel America station was little more than an overflow channel in the New York area for SportsChannel New York.

=== Special programming ===
In 1989, SportsChannel America provided the first ever American coverage of the NHL Draft. In September 1989, SportsChannel America covered the Washington Capitals' training camp in Sweden and pre-season tour of the Soviet Union. The Capitals were joined by the Stanley Cup champion Calgary Flames, who held training camp in Prague, Czechoslovakia and then ventured to the Soviet Union. Each team played four games against Soviet National League clubs. Games were played in Moscow, Leningrad, Kiev and Riga. The NHL clubs finished with a combined 6–2 record against the top Soviet teams, including the Red Army club and Dynamo Moscow. Five of the eight contests were televised by SportsChannel America.

== Production ==
SportsChannel America's master control facilities were located in Floral Park, NY at Cablevision's Rainbow Network Communications facilities, and their studios were located at Dempster Hall at the Hofstra University in Hempstead, NY. Most games aired on the network were simulcasts of the other SportsChannel Regional games. However, there were times when the network produced games of importance that were unavailable on one of the regional networks.

If any of the aforementioned teams made the playoffs, SportsChannel America focused on those teams. For example, SportsChannel Chicago produced the SportsChannel America coverage for the Blackhawks' 1990 playoff run. Because of Blackhawks owner Bill Wirtz' disdain for free and basic cable home game telecasts, the road games were shown in Chicago, with the home games only given short live look-ins as "bonus coverage". The same occurrence happened in 1992, but this time, their home games were broadcast on a pay-per-view basis via "Hawkvision". The Blackhawks broadcasts were also simulcast on Chicago's WBBM radio during those years. The typical outcue to commercial break was...."(score) on SportsChannel......(pause) and WBBM" SportsChannel America would run their own bumper music from the Floral Park Master Control facility so that they could fade out the remote's audio after the announcers said "SportsChannel".

For the Stanley Cup playoffs, SportsChannel America used Bob Papa as the anchor for the coverage. The studio kicked off coverage of each night with a pregame show for all of the regions. Once the games began, the studio produced live cut-ins of every goal for each of the regional games aired. The studio also switched viewers of one game to another game when a period ended or when the game was over. After the early games, the studio then took all viewers out to a West Coast game. After all the hockey for the night, the studio finished the night with a postgame wrap-up show. In 1989, both conference finals series involved two of SportsChannel's regional teams.

Sometimes, they would use the CBC feed for other series involving Canadian teams (the Boston Bruins–Montreal Canadiens series, for example). For the Stanley Cup Final, SportsChannel America used its own facilities regardless of the involvement of regional teams. They would also use their own facilities for any Conference Final series that did not involve one of SportsChannel's regional teams.

=== Announcers ===
Bob Papa and Leandra Reilly were the studio hosts while Denis Potvin was the studio analyst during the regular season coverage. For the Stanley Cup Final, Jiggs McDonald called the play-by-play, and Bill Clement was the color commentator. Also during the Stanley Cup Final, Mike Emrick served as the host while John Davidson served as the rinkside and studio analyst (Herb Brooks filled that role in 1989).

Sometimes, they would use the CBC feed for other series (the Boston Bruins–Montreal Canadiens series, for example). For the Stanley Cup Final, SportsChannel America used its own facilities regardless of the involvement of regional teams. They would also use their own facilities for any Conference Final series that did not involve one of SportsChannel's regional teams. SportsChannel America's master control was at a Cablevision studio in Oak Park, Illinois with its NHL studios located at Adelphi University on Long Island.

==== Play-by-play ====
- Chris Cuthbert
- Mike Emrick
- Pat Foley
- Steve Grad
- Randy Hahn
- Dave Hodge
- John Kelly
- Jiggs McDonald
- Rick Peckham
- Jeff Rimer
- Joe Starkey
- Gary Thorne
- Ken Wilson

==== Color commentary ====
- Bruce Affleck
- Mike Bossy
- Scotty Bowman
- Herb Brooks
- Gerry Cheevers
- Bill Clement
- John Davidson
- Don Edwards
- John Garrett
- Dennis Hull
- John Kelly
- Craig Laughlin
- Dave Maloney
- Peter McNab
- Joe Micheletti
- Jim Peplinski
- Denis Potvin
- Pete Stemkowski
- Dale Tallon
- Ed Westfall

==== Studio/ice level personalities ====
- Mike Breen
- Herb Brooks
- John Davidson
- Stan Fischler
- Al Koken
- Dave Maloney
- Bob Papa
- Denis Potvin
- Leandra Reilly
- Lee Zeidman

== Commentating crews ==
- Chicago Blackhawks: Pat Foley and Dale Tallon
  - SportsChannel Chicago
- Hartford Whalers: Rick Peckham and Gerry Cheevers
  - SportsChannel New England
- New York Islanders: Jiggs McDonald and Ed Westfall
  - SportsChannel New York
- New Jersey Devils: Gary Thorne and Peter McNab
  - SportsChannel New York
- Philadelphia Flyers: Mike Emrick and Bill Clement
  - SportsChannel Philadelphia
- San Jose Sharks: Joe Starkey or Randy Hahn and Dennis Hull, Pete Stemkowski (most games), or Brian Hayward (when Hayward is injured)
  - SportsChannel Pacific

Preceded by ESPN	NHL pay television carrier in the United States; 1988–1992	Succeeded by ESPN
