= List of Colorado Avalanche broadcasters =

This is a list of broadcasters for the Colorado Avalanche ice hockey team.

== Current broadcasters ==
- Marc Moser – TV play-by-play
- Mark Rycroft – TV color commentator
- John-Michael Liles – TV studio analyst
- Kyle Keefe – TV studio host (rotating)
- Conor McGahey – Radio play-by-play/analyst
- Mark Bertagnolli – Radio studio host
- Alan Roach – Public address
- Rachel Tos - TV Studio

== Radio ==
Years	Play-by-play	Color commentator
1995–2004	Mike Haynes	Norm Jones
2005–07	Norm Jones	Curtis Leschyshyn
2007–09	Norm Jones	Marc Moser
2009–18	Marc Moser	
2018–present	Conor McGahey	

== Television ==
Avalanche games have aired on regional sports network Altitude Sports and Entertainment since 2004, replacing FSN Rocky Mountain.

Years	Play-by-play	Color commentator
1995–2004	John Kelly	Peter McNab
2005–06	Doug McLeod (20 games); Mike Haynes (rest of season)	Peter McNab
2005–18	Mike Haynes	Peter McNab
2018–November 6, 2022	Marc Moser	Peter McNab; Mark Rycroft (select games)
November 7, 2022–present	Marc Moser	Mark Rycroft/John-Michael Liles

=== Notes ===
- Doug McLeod was appointed to replace John Kelly in 2005, but was abruptly replaced after only 20 games. An Altitude Sports executive explained the change by saying the network was "looking for a little different style".
- On April 7, 2008, Haynes was diagnosed with a brain aneurysm of his basilar artery. He successfully underwent surgery for the problem two days later, but was unable to do the play-by-play for the Colorado Avalanche in the 2008 Stanley Cup playoffs. Former Avalanche and current St. Louis Blues announcer John Kelly filled in during Haynes's absence before Haynes returned next season.
- On June 8, 2009, McNab signed a multi-year deal with Altitude, where he started his 14th season as the color commentator for the Colorado Avalanche at the beginning of the 2009-2010 NHL season.
