= Ken Wilson (sportscaster) =

American sports announcer (born 1947)

- Born: October 20, 1947 (age 78); Detroit, Michigan, U.S.
- Education: B.A., University of Michigan
- Spouse: Marlene Wilson
- Children: 4

Ken Wilson (born October 20, 1947) is an American sportscaster, known primarily for his many years as a play-by-play announcer of National Hockey League (NHL) and Major League Baseball (MLB) games.

For twenty seasons Wilson called St. Louis Blues hockey on FoxSports Net Midwest, KPLR-TV, and KMOX radio. His famous catch phrase when calling Blues games was 'Oh Baby!', which he injected during moments of extreme excitement. Wilson called NHL games for 22 seasons, including games for ESPN and SportsChannel America, and spent 24 seasons broadcasting for several Major League Baseball teams.

== Early life and education ==
"I try to be very descriptive. That’s essential on the radio and even on TV because folks have trouble seeing the puck and identifying players."

— Ken Wilson

Wilson was born in Detroit, Michigan, on October 20, 1947. He played hockey and baseball as a youngster, graduating in 1965 from Redford High School, where he was an All-City baseball player. During the 1960s he was greatly influenced by Detroit Tigers broadcaster Ernie Harwell, who would later provide him with career advice. In 1969 he earned a degree in journalism from the University of Michigan. While attending Michigan he got his first broadcasting job at WCBY in Cheboygan, Michigan following his freshman year. He later worked at WPAG in Ann Arbor, Michigan and WPHM in Port Huron, Michigan during college, as well as at WCBN, the Michigan student radio station, where he did play-by-play of football, basketball, hockey and baseball. Wilson then attended graduate school at the University of Hawaiʻi in Honolulu, Hawaii.

== Career in Hawaii ==
While attending graduate school, Wilson worked as a disc jockey at KKUA in Honolulu. He landed a play-by-play position with the AAA Hawaii Islanders in 1970, working with Al Michaels. During a seven-year stretch living in Hawaii (1970-1976), he not only did play-by-play for the Islanders, but became sports director of the NBC affiliate in Honolulu, called University of Hawaii basketball games on radio and TV, and did play-by-play of high school football and basketball on radio. Wilson coined the term "Fabulous Five" to describe the all-black Hawaii basketball starting five that played in the NIT and the NCAA tournament during the early 1970s. (In his memoir, Dreams from My Father, President Barack Obama recalled coming of age during that time, watching this group.) Two decades later the name was resurrected at the University of Michigan during the Chris Webber and Jalen Rose era. Wilson also called Cincinnati Swords (American Hockey League) games from 1972-1974. In 1974 he developed one of the first sports talk radio shows in the United States, Hawaii Sports Huddle. In 1976 he received acclaim as Hawaii Sportscaster of the Year, prior to moving on to become the first announcer for the Seattle Mariners, along with Dave Niehaus, in 1977.

== Hockey play-by-play ==
In 1986, he became the play-by-play announcer of the NHL on ESPN in the regular season, working primarily with Bill Clement and called the 1986 Stanley Cup Final. In 1987, on ESPN, he called Rendez-vous '87 in Quebec City, an international hockey series between the Soviet National Team and the NHL All-Stars. From 1988–1992, he called NHL games on SportsChannel America, partnered with Herb Brooks. He also did hockey play-by-play for the 1990 Goodwill Games on TBS, working with John Davidson.

Here's Ramage, for Federko too far, Federko steals the puck from Reinheart, over to Hunter who shoots, blocked, Wickenheiser scores! Doug Wickenheiser! The Blues pull it off and it's unbelievable!

— Ken Wilson calls Doug Wickenheiser's overtime goal during the Monday Night Miracle, May 12, 1986

After spending two seasons as the television voice of the Chicago Blackhawks (1982–1984), working with Dale Tallon, he was approached by Anheuser-Busch, then part owner of the Sports Time Cable Network, to move from covering the Blackhawks to the St. Louis Blues to partner with play-by-play announcer Dan Kelly. He called his first St. Louis Blues game on October 11, 1984, a 4–2 Blues win in Calgary. He called one of the greatest games in St. Louis Blues history, known as the Monday Night Miracle, during the 1986 playoffs. His association as the Blues' play-by-play announcer continued to grow stronger after that. After Kelly's death, he became the team's TV play-by-play announcer with former Blues players Joe Micheletti, Bruce Affleck, and Bernie Federko. He earned the Missouri Sportscaster of the Year award in 2001, along with four Mid-America Emmy Awards for play-by-play. After the 2003–04 NHL season, when his contract ended after calling 1,556 National Hockey League games, he moved back to Honolulu.

== Baseball play-by-play ==
After broadcasting baseball at the University of Michigan (Big 10) and with the Hawaii Islanders (AAA), Wilson joined the expansion Seattle Mariners in 1977. Wilson spent six seasons with the Mariners. In 1983, after moving to Chicago to broadcast hockey, Wilson worked part-time for the Chicago White Sox. Wilson also was the television voice of the Cincinnati Reds (1983–85). During the 1985 baseball season, Wilson, working with Joe Morgan, called Pete Rose's 4192nd hit that broke Ty Cobb's all-time record. Having already moved to doing hockey with the St. Louis Blues in 1984, he moved to announcing select St. Louis Cardinals games in 1985, while handling Reds' television at the same time. He continued his work in baseball, announcing Cardinals games between 1985 and 1990, California Angels' games from 1991–1995, Oakland A's games from 1996–1998, and Seattle Mariners games in 2011 and 2012. Wilson is one of a handful of broadcasters to call three perfect games during his big league career (Kenny Rogers, Texas Rangers, 1994; Phillip Humber, Chicago White Sox, 2012, and, Felix Hernandez, Seattle Mariners, 2012), as well as two no-hitters, George Brett's 3,000th hit and Gaylord Perry's 300th victory. Wilson did radio and television play-by-play for the Hawaii Winter Baseball League in 2006 and 2007. He returned to the Seattle Mariners' television booth on July 27, 2008 to fill-in for his former partner Dave Niehaus, who was being inducted to the Hall of Fame on the same day. Wilson returned to the Mariners again for the 2011 and 2012 seasons, providing radio and TV play-by-play as part of a rotating committee of announcers replacing Niehaus, who died on November 10, 2010. Wilson broadcast 2,230 games during his Major League career. He won the 2023−24 Broadcaster of the Year award in the Australian Baseball League as the television voice of the Brisbane Bandits.

== Other notable career ==
While working in Seattle, Wilson did play-by-play for Seattle Pacific University basketball and later was the radio voice of Washington State University basketball.

During his time at Sports Time, Wilson called the U.S. Olympic Basketball Team game against a team of NBA stars, played at the Hoosier Dome in Indianapolis, Indiana on July 9, 1984. The crowd of 67,678 was the largest crowd to see a basketball game in the U.S. at the time.

Wilson was also the Sports Time voice of Big 8 basketball (1984–85), partnering with Lucius Allen.

During the 1990s, he did boxing, Friday Night Ringside, with Boom Boom Mancini, including covering early Mike Tyson bouts, as well as Grand Prix Horse Jumping on ESPN.

In 1997, Wilson purchased the Zanesville (Ohio) Baseball Club of the independent Frontier League and moved the club to the western suburbs of St. Louis. He formed an investor group and served as managing partner of the River City Rascals, until selling his interest in 2004. He helped form a second group that purchased a Frontier League expansion team in 2000. That club began play in 2001 in the eastern suburbs of St. Louis as the Gateway Grizzlies. Wilson sold his ownership interest in that club in 2013.

When he moved back to Honolulu in 2004, he spent a year as a reporter on KHON-TV, prior to opening Mama's Island Pizza in 2005. Along with his wife, Wilson operated the restaurant until February 2008.

In 2008, Wilson became president of the West Coast League, a top summer collegiate wood-bat baseball league, serving in that position until 2013. The following year he helped found and became president of the Great West League, a summer collegiate wood-bat baseball league that began play in 2016.

In 2015, Wilson became owner and operator of the Portland Pickles, a team in the Great West League. The Pickles had 16 sellouts and played to 99% of capacity at Portland's Walker Stadium in their inaugural 2016 season. Following the season, Wilson divested himself of his ownership interest in the team and served full-time as the commissioner of the Great West League, until it ceased operating following the 2018 season.

In 2020 he founded the Women's Collegiate Softball League in Portland, Oregon, to begin play with the All-Star Softball Festival in July, 2022. Following the All-Star Softball Festival it was decided to disband the league.

Wilson became commissioner of the Front Range League in 2025, a summer collegiate wood-bat league with teams in Colorado and Nebraska.

Preceded by Dan Kelly	Stanley Cup Final American network television play-by-play announcer 1986 (with Sam Rosen; Wilson called Games 3-5)	Succeeded by Mike Emrick
Preceded by Dan Kelly	St. Louis Blues television/radio play-by-play announcer 1984-2004	Succeeded by John Kelly
