= Hal Kelly =

Canadian sportscaster (1920–1998)

Joseph Harold "Hal" Kelly (July 9, 1920 – March 23, 1998) was a Canadian sportscaster who covered the National Football League and the Montreal Expos Major League Baseball team for CBC Television.

== Early life and career ==
Kelly was born on July 9, 1920, in Ottawa. His father died when Kelly was sixteen and he helped his mother raise his three brothers and sister. Kelly attended Saint Patrick's College. He was a member of the school's football team, although injuries limited his playing time. After graduating from Saint Patrick's in 1939, he became an English-language newscaster at CKCH, a bilingual radio station in Hull, Ontario. After six months, he joined CKCO in Ottawa as a sports announcer, calling Interprovincial Rugby Football Union football and Allan Cup hockey games. After a two-year stint as a navigational instructor with the Royal Canadian Air Force, Jack Kent Cooke hired Kelly to call Toronto Maple Leafs baseball games on CKEY.

== CBC ==
Kelly was a part of the CBC's IRFU and Queen's Plate broadcasts. In 1961, he became the host of the network's National Football League broadcasts. He was the television play-by-play announcer the Montreal Expos during their inaugural 1969 season. In 1971, the CBC replaced Kelly with Dave Van Horne at the behest of the Expos.

== United States ==
From 1968 to 1970, Kelly filled in for his brother, Dan, on St. Louis Blues broadcasts when Dan was calling NHL games for CBS. Kelly was the television announcer for the Minnesota North Stars from 1970 to 1973, the New York Islanders from 1973 to 1974, and the Washington Capitals during their inaugural 1974–75 season. Kelly retired in 1975 due to rheumatoid arthritis.

== Personal life ==
Kelly's younger brother, Dan Kelly, was an announcer for Hockey Night in Canada, the St. Louis Blues, and the NFL on CBS. Their other two brothers, Lomer and Martin, were killed during World War II. Dan's sons, John and Dan, are also sports announcers.

Following his retirement, he spent his winters in Tarpon Springs, Florida and his summers on Lake Clear in Eganville, Ontario. He died on March 23, 1998, in Ottawa after a lengthy illness.
