= Richard Kromm =

Canadian-born American ice hockey player

- Born: March 29, 1964 (age 62) Trail, British Columbia, Canada
- Height: 5 ft 11 in (180 cm)
- Weight: 180 lb (82 kg; 12 st 12 lb)
- Position: Left wing
- Shot: Left
- Played for: Calgary Flames; New York Islanders
- NHL draft: 37th overall, 1982; Calgary Flames
- Playing career: 1983–1993

Richard Gordon "Rich" Kromm (born March 29, 1964) is a Canadian-born American former professional ice hockey left winger who played for the Calgary Flames and the New York Islanders.

== Biography ==
Born in Trail, British Columbia, Kromm was raised in Dallas, Texas; Winnipeg, Manitoba; and Detroit, Michigan, while his father coached different professional teams. In minor hockey in Winnipeg, Richard played on a line with future NHL star, Brett Hull, whose dad, Bobby, played for the Winnipeg Jets (Rich's dad, Bobby Kromm, was the coach of the Jets). Kromm and Hull played together in the 1977 Quebec International Pee-Wee Hockey Tournament with the Winnipeg South Monarchs minor ice hockey team. Kromm was drafted in the 1982 NHL entry draft by the Flames with the 37th overall pick.

Kromm made his NHL debut on November 29, 1983 against the Philadelphia Flyers. In that game he got an assist. His final NHL season was 1992–93. He only played one game that year, but in that game he scored a goal and 2 assists, raising his points per game average to 3.00 for the season. This is the NHL record for single season point per game average which Kromm shares with Bill Kyle who also achieved the average in a single game during 1950–51 NHL season.

On August 8, 2007, Kromm became the head coach of the Portland Winter Hawks. Kromm played with the team from 1981 to 1984. He is a former captain for the Winter Hawks, playing in 142 regular-season games, recording 62 goals and 110 assists. In 28 playoff games, he had seven goals and 16 assists. He played on the 1982–83 Memorial Cup champion team, scoring 35 goals with 68 assists during the regular season. He is the former head coach of the Evansville IceMen hockey team of the ECHL. On July 15, 2013, Kromm was named the head coach and director of hockey operations for the Stockton Thunder, an ECHL affiliate of one of his former NHL clubs, the New York Islanders.

Kromm's daughter Erica played professional ice hockey for the Calgary Inferno in the Canadian Women's Hockey League before the league's collapse. Appearing with the Inferno in the 2016 Clarkson Cup finals, she registered a +2 rating as the Inferno emerged victorious in a convincing 8-3 final. Having also played in the PWHPA, she became a member of the Long Island Sharks women's ice hockey coaching staff.

== Career statistics ==
			Regular season					Playoffs
Season	Team	League	GP	G	A	Pts	PIM	GP	G	A	Pts	PIM
1980–81	Windsor Royals	WOHL	39	22	31	53	40	—	—	—	—	—
1981–82	Portland Winterhawks	WHL	60	16	38	54	30	14	0	3	3	17
1982–83	Portland Winterhawks	WHL	72	35	68	103	64	14	7	13	20	12
1983–84	Portland Winterhawks	WHL	10	10	4	14	13	—	—	—	—	—
1983–84	Calgary Flames	NHL	53	11	12	23	27	11	1	1	2	9
1984–85	Calgary Flames	NHL	73	20	32	52	32	3	0	1	1	4
1985–86	Calgary Flames	NHL	63	12	17	29	31	—	—	—	—	—
1985–86	New York Islanders	NHL	14	7	7	14	4	3	0	1	1	0
1986–87	New York Islanders	NHL	70	12	17	29	20	14	1	3	4	4
1987–88	New York Islanders	NHL	71	5	10	15	20	5	0	0	0	5
1988–89	New York Islanders	NHL	20	1	6	7	4	—	—	—	—	—
1988–89	Springfield Indians	AHL	48	21	26	47	15	—	—	—	—	—
1989–90	Leksands IF	SHL	40	8	15	23	28	3	3	1	4	0
1989–90	Springfield Indians	AHL	9	3	4	7	4	16	1	5	6	4
1990–91	New York Islanders	NHL	6	1	0	1	0	—	—	—	—	—
1990–91	Capital District Islanders	AHL	76	19	36	55	18	—	—	—	—	—
1991–92	New York Islanders	NHL	1	0	0	0	0	—	—	—	—	—
1991–92	Capital District Islanders	AHL	76	16	39	55	36	7	2	3	5	6
1992–93	New York Islanders	NHL	1	1	2	3	0	—	—	—	—	—
1992–93	Capital District Islanders	AHL	79	20	34	54	28	3	0	0	0	0
NHL totals			372	70	103	173	138	36	2	6	8	22
