= Bill Kyle =

Canadian ice hockey player

- Born: December 23, 1924 Dysart, Saskatchewan, Canada
- Died: April 17, 1968 (aged 43)
- Height: 6 ft 1 in (185 cm)
- Weight: 210 lb (95 kg; 15 st 0 lb)
- Position: Center
- Shot: Right
- Played for: New York Rangers
- Playing career: 1939–1961

William Miller Kyle (December 23, 1924 – April 17, 1968) was a Canadian professional ice hockey player who played three games in the National Hockey League, with the New York Rangers during the 1949–50 and 1950–51 seasons. The rest of his career, which lasted from 1945 to 1961, was spent in various minor leagues.

Kyle is also NHL record holder for the best single season points per game average with 3.00 in 1950–51, scoring 3 points in his one-game that season. Richard Kromm equaled the record in the 1992–93 season, also achieved in a single game. Bill's brother of Gus Kyle also played in the NHL..

== Career statistics ==
=== Regular season and playoffs ===
| | | | Regular season | | | | | Playoffs |
| Season | Team | League | GP | G | A | Pts | PIM | GP | G | A | Pts | PIM |
|---|---|---|---|---|---|---|---|---|---|---|---|---|
| 1939–40 | Notre Dame Hounds | U18 AAA | 5 | 1 | 0 | 1 | 2 | — | — | — | — | — |
| 1940–41 | Dysart Devils | SIHA | 17 | 7 | 8 | 15 | 29 | 2 | 0 | 0 | 0 | 2 |
| 1941–42 | Notre Dame Hounds | U18 AAA | 11 | 6 | 5 | 11 | 6 | 5 | 2 | 3 | 5 | 4 |
| 1942–43 | Regina Commandos | SAHA | 12 | 10 | 10 | 20 | 14 | 6 | 6 | 2 | 8 | 10 |
| 1942–43 | Regina Commandos | M-Cup | — | — | — | — | — | 2 | 0 | 1 | 1 | 0 |
| 1945–46 | Portland Eagles | PCHL | 58 | 38 | 33 | 71 | 60 | 8 | 7 | 2 | 9 | 6 |
| 1946–47 | Portland Eagles | PCHL | 54 | 40 | 59 | 99 | 60 | 14 | 7 | 10 | 17 | 4 |
| 1947–48 | Regina Capitals | WCSHL | 48 | 29 | 43 | 72 | 26 | 4 | 1 | 1 | 2 | 2 |
| 1948–49 | Regina Capitals | WCSHL | 48 | 21 | 41 | 62 | 56 | 4 | 1 | 1 | 2 | 2 |
| 1948–49 | Regina Capitals | Al-Cup | — | — | — | — | — | 14 | 5 | 14 | 19 | 14 |
| 1949–50 | New York Rangers | NHL | 2 | 0 | 0 | 0 | 0 | — | — | — | — | — |
| 1949–50 | Regina Capitals | WCSHL | 44 | 17 | 28 | 45 | 58 | — | — | — | — | — |
| 1950–51 | New York Rangers | NHL | 1 | 0 | 3 | 3 | 0 | — | — | — | — | — |
| 1950–51 | Regina Capitals | WCSHL | 44 | 17 | 28 | 45 | 55 | — | — | — | — | — |
| 1950–51 | New York Rovers | EAHL | 1 | 1 | 0 | 1 | 0 | 5 | 1 | 3 | 4 | 0 |
| 1951–52 | Sherbrooke Saints | QSHL | 60 | 20 | 31 | 51 | 36 | 11 | 1 | 2 | 3 | 2 |
| 1952–53 | Regina Capitals | SSHL | 31 | 23 | 38 | 61 | 23 | 7 | 7 | 8 | 15 | 4 |
| 1952–53 | Regina Capitals | Al-Cup | — | — | — | — | — | 13 | 2 | 8 | 10 | 4 |
| 1953–54 | Regina Capitals | SSHL | 37 | 20 | 34 | 54 | 18 | — | — | — | — | — |
| 1954–55 | Yorkton Terriers | Exhib | — | — | — | — | — | — | — | — | — | — |
| 1955–56 | Regina/Brandon Regals | WHL | 66 | 13 | 45 | 58 | 44 | — | — | — | — | — |
| 1958–59 | Regina Capitals | SSHL | 9 | 6 | 10 | 16 | 2 | — | — | — | — | — |
| 1959–60 | Regina Capitals | SSHL | 13 | 6 | 16 | 22 | 2 | 9 | 6 | 7 | 13 | 2 |
| 1960–61 | Regina Capitals | SSHL | 14 | 12 | 5 | 17 | 10 | 9 | 1 | 4 | 5 | 0 |
| PCHL/WHL totals | | | 178 | 91 | 137 | 228 | 164 | 22 | 14 | 12 | 26 | 10 |
| NHL totals | | | 3 | 0 | 3 | 3 | 0 | — | — | — | — | — |
