= Dan P. Kelly =

Radio and TV announcer usually of hockey and soccer

Daniel Patrick Kelly (born October 15, 1973) is an American sportscaster. He is the son of St. Louis Blues broadcaster Dan Kelly, the nephew of hockey and baseball broadcaster Hal Kelly, and the younger brother of current Los Angeles Kings and former St. Louis Blues and Colorado Avalanche TV play-by-play broadcaster John Kelly. He is the former television play-by-play voice for Chicago Fire in Major League Soccer on ESPN+, announcing on October 25, 2019, that his time with the Fire had ended.

== Career ==
Kelly graduated from the University of Dayton in 1996 with a degree in Radio Television Communications. In 1997, he returned to his hometown, St. Louis, Missouri to become the radio play-by-play voice for KMOX broadcasts of St. Louis Blues. In 2000, Kelly joined Fox Sports Net Ohio as the first TV play-by-play announcer for the Columbus Blue Jackets. He also hosted the Blue Jackets' pre-game and post-game shows. While in Columbus Kelly won a Midwestern Regional Emmy in 2003 for outstanding live sports coverage.

His time with the Blue Jackets and FSN Ohio was cut short by the 2004–05 NHL lockout. In 2004, Kelly became the play-by-play announcer for the University of Denver Pioneers ice hockey games on Fox Sports Net Rocky Mountain. He also served as sideline reporter for college football games and hosted the Denver Broncos half-time shows on FSN Rocky Mountain. After one season with DU, Kelly returned to NHL broadcasts for HDNet coverage.

In 2006, after one season at HDNet, Kelly became the play-by-play announcer for the Chicago Blackhawks on Comcast SportsNet Chicago alongside color commentator Eddie Olczyk. He was let go by the Blackhawks after two seasons on June 16, 2008, when the Blackhawks announced Pat Foley, who had been their play-by-play broadcaster for 25 previous seasons, would return as their television play-by-play announcer.

In 2006, he returned to Denver to broadcast DU hockey and basketball games on Fox Sports Rocky Mountain TV. In 2010, Kelly returned to Comcast SportsNet Chicago and began broadcasting games for the Chicago Fire FC of Major League Soccer. He also began working with the Big Ten Network as play-by-play announcer for Big Ten's coverage of college basketball, field hockey, ice hockey, soccer, and volleyball.
