= Gus Kyle =

Canadian ice hockey player

- Born: September 11, 1923; Dysart, Saskatchewan, Canada
- Died: November 17, 1996 (aged 73); Affton, Missouri, U.S.
- Height: 6 ft 1 in (185 cm)
- Weight: 202 lb (92 kg; 14 st 6 lb)
- Position: Defence
- Shot: Left
- Played for: New York Rangers; Boston Bruins
- Playing career: 1941–1956

Walter Lawrence "Gus" Kyle (September 11, 1923 – November 17, 1996) was a Canadian ice hockey defenceman who played 203 games in the National Hockey League for the New York Rangers and Boston Bruins between 1949 and 1952. The rest of his career, which lasted from 1941 to 1956, was spent in different amateur and minor leagues.

Kyle scored six goals in his NHL career, five of them for the New York Rangers. His other goal was his lone tally for Boston. It occurred on January 13, 1952 in Boston's 5-4 home win over the Chicago Black Hawks.

Following the close of his playing career, Kyle coached in the minor professional Western Hockey League and Central Hockey League between 1957 and 1964. Kyle became the sales director for the expansion St. Louis Blues and spent some two decades on the Blues radio broadcasting team.

Gus is the brother of Bill Kyle. Prior to the NHL, Kyle was a Royal Canadian Mounted Policeman during the years 1942 - 1947, when he purchased his discharge to play professional hockey.

== Career statistics ==
=== Regular season and playoffs ===
			Regular season					Playoffs
Season	Team	League	GP	G	A	Pts	PIM	GP	G	A	Pts	PIM
1939–40	Notre Dame Hounds	S-SJHL	7	1	0	1	2	—	—	—	—	—
1940–41	Notre Dame Hounds	S-SJHL	17	7	8	15	29	2	0	0	0	2
1941–42	New York Rovers	EAHL	57	5	17	22	89	7	1	2	3	18
1942–43	Ottawa Postal Corps	OCHL	18	7	18	25	43	4	1	4	5	2
1943–44	Saint John Beavers	NBDHL	1	1	0	1	0	1	2	0	2	0
1943–44	Fredericton Army	NBDHL	5	8	3	11	—	—	—	—	—	—
1944–45	Saint John Beavers	Al-Cup	—	—	—	—	—	6	5	0	5	14
1945–46	Saint John Beavers	SJCHL	9	4	5	9	16	2	2	1	3	0
1945–46	Saint John Beavers	Al-Cup	—	—	—	—	—	8	4	4	8	32
1946–47	Saint John Beavers	MSHL	39	24	41	65	115	6	4	6	10	8
1947–48	Regina Capitals	WCSHL	43	15	20	35	76	4	1	0	1	4
1948–49	Regina Capitals	WCSHL	40	5	10	15	100	7	0	0	0	8
1948–49	Regina Capitals	Al-Cup	—	—	—	—	—	14	2	6	8	28
1949–50	New York Rangers	NHL	70	3	5	8	143	12	1	2	3	30
1950–51	New York Rangers	NHL	64	2	3	5	92	—	—	—	—	—
1951–52	Boston Bruins	NHL	69	1	12	13	127	2	0	0	0	4
1952–53	Calgary Stampeders	WHL	70	8	22	30	146	5	0	3	3	18
1953–54	Calgary Stampeders	WHL	69	10	17	27	94	12	0	5	5	23
1954–55	Calgary Stampeders	WHL	66	5	16	21	88	9	0	3	3	8
1955–56	Calgary Stampeders	WHL	7	0	3	3	10	—	—	—	—	—
WHL totals			212	23	58	81	338	26	0	11	11	49
NHL totals			203	6	20	26	362	14	1	2	3	34
