= OLN =

OLN may refer to:

- Bravo (Canadian TV channel), a Canadian television channel known as OLN, or the Outdoor Life Network, from 1997 until 2024
- NBCSN, an American television channel known as OLN, or the Outdoor Life Network, from 1995 until 2006
- Lago Musters Airport (IATA airport code), an airport in Sarmiento, Chubut, Argentina
- Olin Corporation (NYSE ticker symbol OLN), an American chemical manufacturer

== See also ==
- Outdoor Life, an American magazine which was the namesake of both versions of the Outdoor Life Network
