= Joe Micheletti =

American ice hockey player and broadcaster

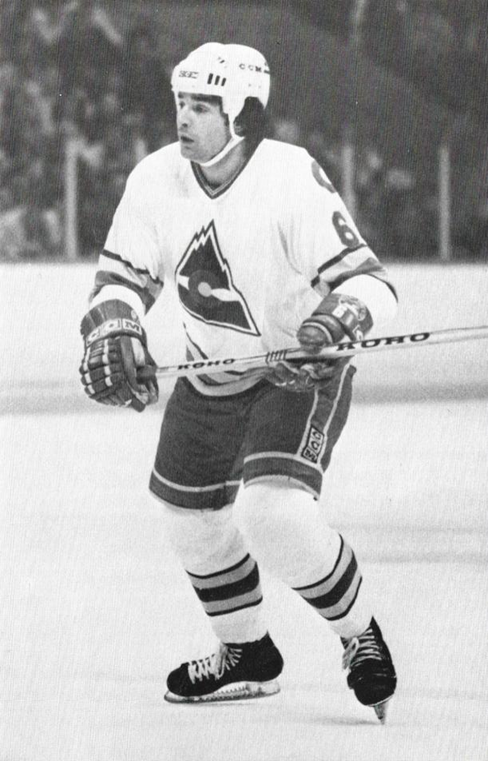
- Micheletti in 1981 postcard
- Born: October 24, 1954 (age 71) International Falls, Minnesota, U.S.
- Height: 6 ft 0 in (183 cm)
- Weight: 185 lb (84 kg; 13 st 3 lb)
- Position: Defense
- Shot: Left
- Played for: Calgary Cowboys; Edmonton Oilers; St. Louis Blues; Colorado Rockies
- National team: United States
- NHL draft: 123rd overall, 1974; Montreal Canadiens
- WHA draft: 77th overall, 1974; Cincinnati Stingers
- Playing career: 1977–1982

Joseph Robert Micheletti (born October 24, 1954) is an American ice hockey analyst and reporter, and a former defenseman who played in 142 World Hockey Association (WHA) games with the Calgary Cowboys and Edmonton Oilers between 1977 and 1979, and 158 National Hockey League (NHL) games with the St. Louis Blues and Colorado Rockies between 1979 and 1982. He is the brother of former NHL player Pat Micheletti.

== Career ==
=== Amateur career ===
Joe Micheletti was raised in Hibbing, Minnesota, where he attended Hibbing High School.

He played college hockey under Herb Brooks at the University of Minnesota, where he was a member of the 1974 and 1976 national championship teams. He broke team records set by Lou Nanne in both assists and points in his senior year, and was also the most valuable player of the 1976 NCAA finals.

=== Professional career ===
Originally drafted 123rd overall by the Montreal Canadiens in the 1974 NHL entry draft, Micheletti instead chose to start his professional career in the rival World Hockey Association with the Calgary Cowboys in 1977. He also made his international debut for the United States national team at the 1977 Ice Hockey World Championship tournament in Vienna.

As a professional, Micheletti played in 142 WHA games, mainly with the Edmonton Oilers, totalling 31 goals and 70 assists. He joined the NHL's St. Louis Blues for the 1979–80 season and later concluded his career with the Colorado Rockies. His NHL career totals were 11 goals, and 60 assists for 71 points in 158 games. His playing career ended in the spring of 1982, when he was a member of the United States team at the 1982 Ice Hockey World Championship tournament in Helsinki.

=== Broadcasting career ===
Over the years, he has worked as an ice-level reporter or color analyst for Fox, ESPN/ABC, and NBC broadcasts of the NHL. Micheletti worked the 1994 Winter Olympics with Jiggs McDonald for TNT and also worked the 1998 Winter Olympics for CBS. During his time with NBC Sports, he covered hockey at the 2002, 2006, and 2010 Winter Olympics, paired with Kenny Albert. The pair called four Stanley Cup Finals from 2016 to 2019 and other key events together on NBC Sports Radio. In addition, Pierre McGuire joined the pair for one Conference Final. In 2009, he became a color commentator for NHL on Versus.

On the local level, Micheletti first worked as a color commentator for the St. Louis Blues where he partnered with Dan Kelly and/or Ken Wilson on TV and radio before pairing up with Wilson permanently in 1992. In between, he paired with Dave Hodge on TV broadcasts for the Minnesota North Stars in the 1991–92 season after spending three years behind the bench as an assistant coach. In 1998, he joined the New York Islanders as a color commentator, where he worked with Howie Rose. In 2006, he replaced long-time color commentator and former Ranger John Davidson, who had departed to take a position with the St. Louis Blues as team president, as the New York Rangers color commentator on MSG Network, partnered with Sam Rosen, who he paired previously on Fox.

=== Coaching career ===
On June 10, 1987, he joined the St. Louis Blues as an assistant coach with Doug MacLean under head coach Jacques Martin. One year later, Bob Berry joined him in that role under head coach Brian Sutter. He spent four years in that role.

== Career statistics ==
=== Regular season and playoffs ===
			Regular season					Playoffs
Season	Team	League	GP	G	A	Pts	PIM	GP	G	A	Pts	PIM
1970–71	Hibbing High School	HS-MN	—	—	—	—	—	—	—	—	—	—
1971–72	Hibbing High School	HS-MN	—	—	—	—	—	—	—	—	—	—
1972–73	Hibbing High School	HS-MN	—	—	—	—	—	—	—	—	—	—
1973–74	University of Minnesota	WCHA	21	2	5	7	10	—	—	—	—	—
1974–75	University of Minnesota	WCHA	42	7	13	20	44	—	—	—	—	—
1975–76	University of Minnesota	WCHA	33	7	24	31	46	—	—	—	—	—
1976–77	University of Minnesota	WCHA	39	9	39	48	53	—	—	—	—	—
1976–77	Calgary Cowboys	WHA	14	3	3	6	10	—	—	—	—	—
1977–78	Edmonton Oilers	WHA	56	14	34	48	56	5	0	2	2	4
1978–79	Edmonton Oilers	WHA	72	14	33	47	85	13	0	9	9	2
1979–80	St. Louis Blues	NHL	54	2	16	18	29	—	—	—	—	—
1980–81	St. Louis Blues	NHL	63	4	27	31	53	11	1	11	12	10
1981–82	St. Louis Blues	NHL	20	3	11	14	28	—	—	—	—	—
1981–82	Colorado Rockies	NHL	21	2	6	8	4	—	—	—	—	—
1981–82	Fort Worth Texans	CHL	17	3	14	17	26	—	—	—	—	—
1982–83	WAT Stadlau	AUT	31	18	46	64	77	—	—	—	—	—
WHA totals			142	31	70	101	151	18	0	11	11	6
NHL totals			158	11	60	71	114	11	1	11	12	10

=== International ===
Year	Team	Event	GP	G	A	Pts	PIM
1977	United States	WC	10	0	5	5	8
1982	United States	WC	5	0	0	0	2
Senior totals			15	0	5	5	10
