= Mike Haynes (ice hockey) =

American sports broadcaster

Michael Haynes
- Born: New York City
- Occupation: Sports broadcaster
- Spouse: Victoria Haynes
- Children: Kiara Haynes, Kian Haynes

Michael Haynes is an American sports broadcaster. Until 2018, he was the play-by-play TV broadcaster for the Colorado Avalanche ice hockey team with Altitude Sports and Entertainment. He also called games for the Colorado Mammoth and the Colorado Rapids, as well as hosting Altitude's One-on-One show. Haynes has twice been honored as Denver's Best Sportscaster by Westword magazine. Mike has a wife, Victoria, and two children, daughter Kiara and son Kian. They currently reside in Littleton, Colorado. He also has 5 brothers and sisters. One of them Carl Haynes resides in Seattle, Washington with his children Maya and Carl and his wife Susan.

== Broadcasting roles ==
Being one of the most versatile sports broadcasters, Haynes also calls games for many other sports besides ice hockey, including Colorado Rapids soccer, Colorado Springs Sky Sox baseball, Colorado Mammoth lacrosse, college football and basketball, rodeo, wrestling, and boxing. Previously, Haynes was also the play-by-play announcer for the American Hockey League's Baltimore Skipjacks (1989-90) and Capital District Islanders (1990-93), the Colonial Hockey League's Utica Bulldogs (1993-94), and the International Hockey League's Denver Grizzlies (1994-95). Haynes also called the national championships of Golden Gloves Boxing on Fox Sports in 2002.

== Brain Aneurysm ==
On April 7, 2008, Haynes was diagnosed with a brain aneurysm of his basilar artery. He successfully underwent surgery for the problem two days later, but he was unable to do the play-by-play for the Colorado Avalanche in the 2008 Stanley Cup playoffs. Former Avalanche and current Los Angeles Kings announcer John Kelly filled in in his absence until Haynes returned the next season.

== See also ==
- Colorado Avalanche
- Colorado Rapids
- Colorado Mammoth
- Altitude Sports and Entertainment
- Peter McNab
