= NHL on ESPN =

American live sports television series

- Also known as: ESPN Hockey Night; ESPN+ Hockey Night; ESPN National Hockey Night (1992–2004)
- Genre: Live sports telecast
- Starring: Sean McDonough; Ray Ferraro; Emily Kaplan; Bob Wischusen; Erik Johnson; Leah Hextall; Mike Monaco; Kevin Weekes; Stormy Buonantony; Dave Jackson; Steve Levy; Mark Messier; P. K. Subban; John Buccigross; A. J. Mleczko; Cassie Campbell-Pascall; Roxy Bernstein; T. J. Oshie
- Theme music composer: Bob Christianson
- Country of origin: United States
- Original language: English
- No. of seasons: 18

Production
- Production locations: Various NHL arenas (game telecasts and some pregame, intermission segments and occasional postgame); ESPN's Bristol, CT studios (pregame, intermission segments and occasional postgame)
- Camera setup: Multi-camera
- Running time: 210 minutes or until game ends (inc. adverts)
- Production company: ESPN

Original release
- Network: ESPN (1979–1982, 1985–1988, 1992–2004 and 2021–present); ABC (1993–1994, 2000–2004 and 2021–present); ESPN2 (1993–2004 and 2022–present); ESPN+ (2018–present); Hulu (2021–present); Disney+ (2024–present); ESPN DTC (2025–present); ESPNU (2022–present) (overflow); ESPNews (2022–present) (overflow)
- Release: December 19, 1979 – April 11, 1982
- Release: October 10, 1985 – May 26, 1988
- Release: October 6, 1992 – May 27, 2004
- Release: October 12, 2021 – present

Related
- NHL on ABC; The Point; In the Crease; NHL on TNT (concurrent American rights holders from 2021 to 2028); TSN Hockey (select regional games in Canada, partly owned); NHL on Sportsnet (Canadian rightsholders); NHL on Prime Video (Canadian rightsholders)

The NHL on ESPN is a presentation of National Hockey League (NHL) games produced by ESPN. They have been shown on its various platforms in the United States, including ESPN itself, ABC, ESPN+, ESPN2, ESPNEWS, ESPNU, Hulu, Disney+, and ESPN DTC. Since 2021, games have been broadcast under the ESPN Hockey Night branding or ESPN+ Hockey Night branding.

ESPN first televised NHL games in the 1979–80 season by sub-contracting rights from individual franchises. After the NHL shifted to only having one exclusive rights holder, ESPN acquired the NHL's national television rights in 1985 to replace USA Network (which had previously aired NHL games in parallel with ESPN). ESPN lost the rights to SportsChannel America in 1988.

ESPN regained the NHL's U.S. television rights from 1992 through the 2003–04 season, with the coverage branded under the blanket title ESPN National Hockey Night. In 1999, ESPN renewed its contract through the 2003–04 NHL season, with ABC replacing Fox as the broadcast television rights holder. In 2004, ESPN and the league agreed to a one-year extension worth $60 million, with an option for an additional year.

The 2004–05 season was canceled due to a lockout, thus nullifying the contract. When the lockout ended, the league's cable rights were obtained by Outdoor Life Network, the precursor of NBCSN.

On March 10, 2021, the NHL announced that it would return to ESPN networks under a seven-year contract beginning in the 2021–22 season. ESPN's subscription streaming service, ESPN+, provides the majority of the network's regular-season NHL coverage, carrying a package of exclusive national games, and holding streaming rights to all out-of-market games, replacing the NHL.tv service. ESPN also broadcasts a package of games. ESPN and ESPN2 share coverage of the Stanley Cup playoffs with TNT and TBS, which also includes exclusive rights to the Stanley Cup Final for ABC in even-numbered years.

Like other U.S. national NHL broadcasts, NHL on ESPN games may be available in Canada on Sportsnet or streamed on Sportsnet+. This is as part of a 12-year agreement with the NHL that lasts to the end of the 2025-26 season (it was later extended another 12 years to 2037–38 season), subject to blackout restrictions.

== History ==
=== Early years: 1979–1982 and 1985–1988 ===
ESPN initially covered the NHL during the 1979–80, 1980–81 and 1981–82 seasons by making deals with individual teams. This included 11 Hartford Whalers home broadcasts in 1980–81 and 25 the following year. Branded as ESPN Hockey, Sam Rosen, Barry Landers, and Joe Boyle were employed as play-by-play announcers. Pete Stemkowski was the lead color commentator. During the opening round of the 1982 playoffs, ESPN broadcast game four of the series between the New York Islanders and Pittsburgh Penguins, and game two of the series between the Minnesota North Stars and Chicago Black Hawks, with Sam Rosen and Pete Stemkowski on the call. In the season prior, the pair called games three and four of the playoff series between the St. Louis Blues and Pittsburgh Penguins.

During this time, USA Network also broadcast NHL games. To prevent overexposure, the NHL granted only one network exclusive rights. In April 1982, USA outbid ESPN for the NHL's American national television cable package ($8 million for two years). In 1984, the NHL asked ESPN for a bid, but then gave USA the right to match it, which it did.

After the 1984–85 season, the NHL Board of Governors chose to have USA Network and ESPN submit sealed bids. ESPN won by bidding nearly $25 million for three years, about twice as much as USA had been paying. The contract called for ESPN to air up to 33 regular-season games each season as well as the NHL All-Star Game and the Stanley Cup playoffs. The network chose Dan Kelly and Sam Rosen to be the network's first play-by-play announcers. Mickey Redmond and Brad Park were selected to be the analysts, while Tom Mees and Jim Kelly were chosen to serve as studio hosts. ESPN aired ESPN Hockey Night in America on Sundays, but also aired select midweek telecasts. ESPN aired its first game, an opening-night matchup between the Washington Capitals and New York Rangers, on October 10, 1985.

At the end of the 1987–88 season, ESPN lost the NHL television rights to SportsChannel America, which paid $51 million ($17 million per year) over three years, more than double what ESPN had paid ($24 million) for the previous three years. SportsChannel America paid $5 million for rights to a fourth NHL season. It was only available in a few major markets, absent from Detroit, Pittsburgh, and St. Louis, and it reached a third of the households that ESPN did at the time. In 1988–89, the first year of the deal, SportsChannel America was available in only 7 million homes, compared to ESPN's reach of 50 million. By the 1991–92 season, ESPN was available in 60.5 million homes, whereas SportsChannel America was available in 25 million.

=== Second return to ESPN and ABC's involvement: 1992–1999 ===
When the SportsChannel deal ended in 1992, the league returned to ESPN for another contract that would pay $80 million over five years. Until the 2001–02 NHL season, weekly regular-season games were broadcast on Sundays (between NFL and baseball seasons), Wednesdays, and Fridays. They were titled Sunday/Wednesday/Friday Night Hockey. Before 1999, these telecasts were non-exclusive, meaning they were blacked out in the regions of the competing teams, and an alternate game was shown instead.

During the Stanley Cup playoffs, ESPN and ESPN2 provided almost nightly coverage, often carrying games on both channels concurrently. Games in the first two rounds were non-exclusive, while telecasts in the Conference Finals and Stanley Cup Final were exclusive (except in 1993 and 1994). Beginning in the 1993–94 season, up to five games per week were also shown on ESPN2, branded as NHL Fire on Ice.

Sister broadcast network ABC also aired NHL games during the first two seasons of the contract, in the league's first network television broadcasts since NBC's previous contract in the 1970s. In the first season, this included selected playoff games, and later expanded to include a package of regular-season games in the second season. These telecasts were produced by ESPN and were officially considered to be time-buys on ABC by ESPN Inc. This arrangement ended in the 1994–95 season, when the NHL began a new contract with Fox as its broadcast television partner.

=== Final years, and including ABC full-time: 1999–2004 ===
In 1998, ESPN renewed its contract through 2004 for $600 million, beginning in the 1999–2000 season. Under the new contract, ESPN was permitted two exclusive telecasts per team per season, while ABC would also return as broadcast television rights holder to replace Fox.

ESPN's terms of the deal included up to 200 games a year split between ESPN and ESPN2, the All-Star Skills Challenge, the majority of the Stanley Cup Playoffs and the first two games of the Stanley Cup Final. ABC's terms included rights to the NHL All-Star Game, four to five weeks of regular-season action, with three games a week, six weekends of Stanley Cup Playoff action, and the rest of the Stanley Cup Final.

Beginning in the 1999–2000 season, ESPN was permitted two exclusive telecasts per team per season. When ESPN started broadcasting NBA games on Wednesday and Friday nights in 2002, the weekly hockey broadcasts were moved to Thursday and they were renamed to ESPN Thursday Night Hockey.

Following the 2003–04 season, ESPN was only willing to renew its contract for two additional years at $60 million per year. ABC refused to televise the Stanley Cup Final in prime time, suggesting that the Finals games it would telecast be played on weekend afternoons (including a potential game seven). Disney executives later conceded that they overpaid for the 1999–2004 deal, so the company's offer to renew the television rights was lower in 2004.

Before the 2004–05 lockout, the NHL had reached two separate deals with NBC (which would replace ABC as the NHL's national U.S. broadcast television partner) and ESPN. ESPN offered the NHL $60 million to renew its contract, carrying about 40 games (only 15 of which would be during the regular season), mostly on ESPN2. However, ESPN opted out of the contract following the lockout, and the NHL reopened negotiations. Comcast offered over $200 million for a three-season deal to air games on OLN (later rebranded as Versus to reflect its expansion to mainstream sports), which ESPN declined to match, effectively giving NBC Sports exclusive national broadcasting rights to the league. After Comcast acquired a majority stake in NBC Universal in 2011, it renewed both the broadcast television and cable rights to the league via NBC Sports through the 2020–21 season.

=== World Cup of Hockey: 2016 ===
Long after losing their broadcasting rights to the NHL, ESPN served as the U.S. broadcaster of the NHL-backed 2016 World Cup of Hockey, as NBC declined due to programming conflicts. For the tournament, ESPN named Steve Levy and Barry Melrose as the lead broadcast team, while adding Kevin Weekes from NHL Network, Leah Hextall from Sportsnet, NHL Hall of Famers Chris Chelios and Brett Hull to their roster. ESPN also named NHL Hall of Famers Chris Chelios and Brett Hull as their studio analyst.

Additionally, ESPN brought back St. Louis Blues color commentator Darren Pang, who was the network's secondary color commentator from 1999 to 2004, for their coverage, as an ice-level reporter for select games. John Saunders, who had hosted ESPN and ABC's NHL coverage from 1987 to 1988 and again from 1992 to 2004, was tapped to lead the studio coverage. However, due to his unexpected death a month after ESPN announced their complete roster, Cohn, who was originally going to do features for ESPN, was tapped to replace Saunders.

=== ESPN+ involvement: 2018–present ===
After its 2018 launch, ESPN's subscription streaming service ESPN+ added an NHL studio program. This program has a free daily regular-season game courtesy of NHL.tv (operated by Disney subsidiary BAMTech), and includes a Stanley Cup Playoffs documentary series (replacing one produced as part of Showtime's All Access franchise). As part of the NHL.tv deal, ESPN+ started a night-time show, In the Crease, hosted by Linda Cohn and Barry Melrose.

=== Third return to ESPN and ABC: 2021–present ===
In the years before the end of NBC's latest contract with the NHL, the league explored options for splitting its national broadcast rights, similar to the television deals of the NFL, NBA, and MLB. This included selling packages to streaming services, aiming to maximize the value of its broadcast rights. On March 10, 2021, Disney, ESPN, and the NHL announced that a seven-year agreement was reached for ESPN to hold the first half of its new media rights beginning in the 2021–22 season:

- ESPN holds rights to at least 25 exclusive national games per season, which can air on either ESPN, ESPN2, or ABC, including exclusive rights to opening night games. All ABC games and select ESPN games stream on ESPN+ and, since 2025, Disney+.
- ABC aired the Thanksgiving Showdown in 2021.
- Up to 75 exclusive national games per season are streamed exclusively on ESPN+, and are not carried on linear television. These are also available to Hulu subscribers and later became available for Disney+ subscribers on December 5, 2024.
- ESPN+ streams all out-of-market games, as well as on-demand versions of all nationally televised games. These became available for Disney+ subscribers on December 4, 2024.
- ESPN holds rights to All-Star Weekend, with the Skills Competition airing on ESPN, and the All-Star Game airing on ABC.
- ESPN has held rights to the NHL Stadium Series since 2023, depending on scheduling logistics with TNT.
- ESPN holds rights to the NHL entry draft.
- ESPN, ESPN2, and ABC share coverage of the Stanley Cup playoffs, holding rights to half of the games in the first two rounds and one conference final per season. ESPN/ABC has the first choice of which conference final series to air. The remaining half airs on TNT and TBS. From 2022 to 2025, ESPN chose the Eastern Conference Final in even-numbered years, and the Western Conference Final in odd-numbered years, mirroring that of its NBA counterpart. However, in 2026, ESPN broke the pattern by choosing to broadcast the Western Conference Final. Their selection of Conference Final is typically based on market size, presence of a Canadian team, and marquee stars who were playing in this round.
- Exclusive rights to the Stanley Cup Final alternate between ABC and TNT. ESPN has the ability to air simulcast coverage with alternate feeds on its other channels and platforms.
- ESPN2 airs a weekly studio program dedicated to the NHL, The Point (hosted by John Buccigross), and ESPN holds various highlights and international rights.
- ESPN holds rights to the NHL Awards show in even-numbered years, alternating with TNT.

On May 10, 2021, TSN's Ray Ferraro (who previously worked for ESPN from 2002 to 2004) and NBC's Brian Boucher signed with ESPN/ABC to become their top hockey analysts. A week later, ESPN hired former Calgary Flames studio host Leah Hextall to be a regular play-by-play announcer on NHL broadcasts, the first woman in league history to hold the role. Hextall previously worked the 2016 World Cup of Hockey, and has worked the NCAA Division I Men's Ice Hockey Tournament for ESPN.

On June 9, 2021, ESPN announced that current New Jersey Devils defenseman P. K. Subban would be a studio analyst for the remainder of the 2021 Stanley Cup Playoffs, making his debut on SportsCenter that day. The same day, Craig Morgan, Arizona-based reporter on the Arizona Coyotes and NHL Network correspondent, reported that ESPN had added NBC's Ryan Callahan and A. J. Mleczko to their analyst roster, and that NHL Network's Kevin Weekes, who also worked for ESPN during the 2016 World Cup of Hockey, was in talks to return to ESPN in an analyst/reporter role.

On June 24, ESPN/ABC announced that six-time Stanley Cup Champion Mark Messier had signed a multi-year deal to join ESPN in a studio analyst role. Messier's signing was the first announced signing made by ESPN, and potentially was made as a counter to TNT signing Messier's former teammate Wayne Gretzky, who was also recruited by ESPN. On June 28, Marchand reported that three-time Stanley Cup Champion Chris Chelios would also join ESPN/ABC as a studio analyst, and The Athletic reported that current Hockey Night in Canada color commentator/reporter Cassie Campbell-Pascall would also join the network.

ESPN formally confirmed its commentator teams on June 29, 2021. ESPN's college football No. 2 play-by-play man Sean McDonough would be the network's lead play-by-play announcer; Monday Night Football's Steve Levy would lead studio coverage and contribute to occasional play-by-play commentary. Hextall and Wischusen were officially named as play-by-play commentators, as well as SportsCenter's John Buccigross, who would also contribute as an alternate studio host, and serve as the host for The Point. Barry Melrose, Messier, and Chelios were named studio analysts, while Ferraro, Boucher, Weekes, Campbell-Pascall, Callahan, Mleczko, ESPN New York's Rick DiPietro, and 2018 gold medalist Hilary Knight would contribute as booth, ice-level, and studio analysts. Isobel Cup champion Blake Bolden joined insiders Emily Kaplan and Greg Wyshynski as insiders and rinkside reporters. Linda Cohn continued hosting In the Crease, while also gaining roles as a rinkside reporter, backup studio, and game break host. On August 4, 2021, ESPN announced that they added Blue Jackets head coach and Stanley Cup-winning head coach John Tortorella as an extra studio analyst.

On September 16, after ESPN released their slate of games for the 2021–22 season, SportsCenter anchor and ESPN Social host Arda Ocal announced that he too would host select game broadcasts. On October 2, former referee Dave Jackson joined the network as a rules analyst, an NHL first. Early into the 2021–22 season, ESPN added former NBC analyst Dominic Moore, who had hosted the expansion draft with Weekes and ESPN College Football personality Chris Fowler. Laura Rutledge, host of NFL Live and SEC Nation, joined the NHL on ESPN team for their coverage of the 2022 NHL All-Star Game in a celebrity interviewer role. After preparing for and playing in the 2022 Winter Olympics in Beijing, Knight made her ESPN debut on the March 10, 2022, episode of The Point, coincidentally on the first anniversary of ESPN regaining the rights to broadcast the NHL. Bolden, who has been working as a pro scout for the Los Angeles Kings since 2020, made her official ESPN on-air debut a week later. After the regular season kicked into high gear, Knight and Bolden were the only two who still had to make their on-air debuts with ESPN.

Occasionally, other well-known ESPN personalities like Jeremy Schaap, Kevin Connors, Michael Eaves, and Max McGee will be added in fill-in roles on The Point and In the Crease. Mike Monaco, Roxy Bernstein, and Caley Chelios (daughter of Chris) have also filled in on game coverage. Subban and TSN's Gord Miller, Ferraro's broadcast partner for Maple Leafs games on TSN, joined ESPN for the Stanley Cup Playoffs. Tortorella left ESPN after their first season to become the new head coach of the Philadelphia Flyers. After holding two stints with ESPN during the playoffs, the network announced that Subban would be joining their coverage full-time beginning with the 2022–23 season, holding both studio analyst and color commentator roles. This came after his retirement announcement.

ESPN also confirmed that Spanish language coverage of the NHL would air on ESPN Deportes and ESPN Latin America. Kenneth Garay and Eitán Benezra would be the main play-by-play commentators, while Carlos Rossell and Antonio Valle contribute analysis and color commentary. Rigoberto Plascencia was later added as another play-by-play announcer.

For the 2021–22 season, ESPN aired 18 games (billed as ESPN Hockey Night), while 75 exclusive national games per season would be streamed exclusively on ESPN+. For the 2021–22 season, most of these games (billed as ESPN+ Hockey Night) aired on Tuesday and Thursday nights, with selected games airing on Friday nights. These games were also available to Hulu subscribers. ESPN's first broadcasts were an opening night doubleheader, with the Pittsburgh Penguins at defending Stanley Cup champion Tampa Bay Lightning, and the Seattle Kraken at Vegas Golden Knights in the Kraken's first regular-season game in franchise history.

Typically, games aired on ESPN (excluding those on ESPN+) are simulcast in Canada on the Sportsnet channels, using the ESPN feed. However, on January 17, 2022, TSN, which is partly owned by ESPN, simulcast the ESPN+ feed of the Arizona Coyotes–Montreal Canadiens game because of a huge snowstorm in Canada, which prevented the Montreal Canadiens' broadcast team from traveling to Glendale to broadcast the game.

For the 2022–23 season, out-of-market games on ESPN+, which did not carry any specific branding in the inaugural season, were branded as NHL Power Play on ESPN+. ESPN and ESPN2 aired a combined at least 35 games (billed as ESPN Hockey Night), while ABC aired 15 games under the ABC Hockey Saturday package, which consisted of four doubleheaders, the 2023 NHL Stadium Series, and one late-season tripleheader beginning the weekend after the All-Star break.

On May 14, 2023, ESPN was criticized for its decision to implement a split screen between its coverage of game six of the Stanley Cup Playoff series between the Vegas Golden Knights and Edmonton Oilers and a Sunday Night Baseball telecast between the St. Louis Cardinals and Boston Red Sox, which was being played at the same time and was ultimately won by St. Louis 9–1.

For the 2023–24 season, ESPN+/Hulu aired at least 50 exclusive games. Among linear broadcasts, 19 games aired on ABC, featuring four doubleheaders, both NHL Stadium Series games, and two tripleheaders on February 17 and April 13. ABC also aired the 2024 Stanley Cup Final. ABC Hockey Saturday for this season began on January 13, preceding Super Wild Card Saturday of the NFL playoffs, unlike previous years where its slate began after the NHL All-Star Game, and ESPN aired the rest.

On June 5, 2023, it was announced that Chelios' contract would not be renewed as part of Disney's $5.5 billion cost-cutting. On September 12, 2023, TNT hired Boucher away from ESPN/ABC to serve as Keith Jones' replacement on the top team, thus reuniting with former NBC partners Kenny Albert and Eddie Olczyk. On October 10, 2023, ESPN announced that Barry Melrose would retire from the network to spend more time with his family after being diagnosed with Parkinson's disease. On December 19, 2023, Campbell-Pascall accepted a new position as a special advisor with the Professional Women's Hockey League (PWHL). Although she had left Sportsnet, she remained with ESPN/ABC.

The 2024–25 season would again have ESPN+/Hulu stream at least 50 exclusive games. ESPN2 aired a doubleheader on December 27. ABC's 19-game schedule for this season began earlier than normal on January 4 during the last week of the 2024 NFL regular season. The 2025 Stadium Series would air on ESPN instead of ABC. With the NHL 4 Nations Face-Off tournament replacing the All-Star Game this season, the NHL decided to split it between TNT, ABC, and ESPN: TNT had the round-robin games on February 12 and 17, ABC/ESPN+ aired the February 15 round-robin doubleheader, and ESPN aired the United States–Finland game on February 13 and tourney final on February 20. On October 8, color commentator Ray Ferraro called two games of an opening night tripleheader: the St. Louis Blues at Seattle Kraken, and the Chicago Blackhawks at Utah Hockey Club. Two late-season Washington Capitals games were later added to ESPN's schedule in anticipation of Alexander Ovechkin breaking Wayne Gretzky's career goals record. While the April 12 road game at the Columbus Blue Jackets would air exclusively on ABC, the March 27 road game at the Minnesota Wild would co-exist with the Capitals' own broadcast via the Monumental Sports Network in the Washington metropolitan area. Additionally, the April 17 road game at the Pittsburgh Penguins would air on both ESPN and Monumental in the Capitals' market after it was initially an ESPN-exclusive broadcast. After Ovechkin broke the career goals record in the regular season, the April 15 road game at the New York Islanders was flexed out in favor of the Florida at Tampa Bay game, and the April 17 road game at the Pittsburgh Penguins returned exclusively to ESPN.

A total of 86 games across ESPN and ESPN+/Hulu was slated for the 2025–26 season, with the remaining 16 games airing on ABC. ESPN's schedule had been modified due to the network having reduced rights in its new NBA deal along with ESPN opting out of televising Sunday Night Baseball. ESPN continued to have the opening day tripleheader, but the select games for the rest of the regular season would be on any day of the week except Wednesdays, including a Sunday night doubleheader on April 5 as a Sunday Night Baseball replacement. ESPN had two tripleheaders scheduled on October 7 and October 28. ABC's schedule would begin during the last week of the 2025 NFL regular season, with a game on Saturday, January 3 preceding ABC/ESPN's NFL doubleheader. This included doubleheaders on January 31, February 28, March 7 and April 4, and a tripleheader on April 11. ABC also had one game on January 10 that preceded the Wild Card Weekend of the NFL playoffs, and two primetime games on March 21 and March 28. The 2026 Stanley Cup Final is slated to air on ABC. Like the previous season, the 2026 NHL Stadium Series would air on ESPN instead of ABC. After holding a stint during the playoffs in the previous season, ESPN signed Stanley Cup champion T. J. Oshie to its broadcast crew as a studio and game analyst for the 2025–26 season. In addition, ESPN hired new Los Angeles Kings play-by-play announcer John Kelly and brought back John Tortorella after his coaching stint with the Philadelphia Flyers. Despite the additions, ESPN also announced that Ryan Callahan, who had been with ESPN since it regained NHL rights, would not return for the 2025–26 season.

For the 2026–27 season, ESPN and ESPN+/Hulu is slated to air a total of 84 games, with the other 16 to air on ABC. This includes an opening day tripleheader and a "Frozen Frenzy" tripleheader on October 13. Most ESPN and ESPN+ games are scheduled on Tuesdays and Thursdays, with select Sunday night games after the NFL season concludes. ABC's slate began on January 16, preceding the NFL Wild Card games, with a doubleheader on March 6 and tripleheaders on February 20 (including the 2027 NHL Stadium Series), April 3 and April 10. The NHL All-Star Game would make its return after a three-year absence.

== Alternate broadcasts ==
Since the beginning of ESPN's current NHL contract, the network has occasionally presented alternate broadcasts of games on ESPN+, including Star Watch which featured camera angles focused on specific star players, IceCast which featured a higher camera angle and on-screen statistics, and All-12, an alternate camera angle of the entire ice during the 2023 NHL Stadium Series game, inspired by ESPN's All-22 feeds for college football. In a similar approach to the FoxTrax glowing puck from the '90s, ESPN produced a "Puck Possessor" visual identifier altcast for select ABC games. This takes the main feed and focuses on who has the puck during games. It is broadcast on ESPN+, along with the traditional ABC broadcast.

On March 14, 2023, ESPN presented an alternate youth-oriented broadcast of that night's Washington Capitals–New York Rangers game known as the NHL Big City Greens Classic, simulcast on Disney Channel, Disney XD, Disney+ and ESPN+. The broadcast leveraged the league's player and puck tracking system to render a real-time 3D animated perspective of the game based on the Disney Channel animated series Big City Greens.

ESPN+ and ESPN2 aired Frozen Frenzy on October 24, 2023, a whip-around broadcast similar to NFL RedZone carrying live look-ins on all games occurring that night. All 32 NHL teams played games that night with games having staggered start times and a tripleheader on ESPN.

ESPN brought back the NHL Big City Greens Classic for the March 9, 2024, broadcast of that day's Pittsburgh Penguins-Boston Bruins game, which was the second half of an ABC Hockey Saturday doubleheader. Like the Capitals-Rangers game the prior year, this broadcast was simulcast on Disney Channel, Disney XD, Disney+ and ESPN+, and featured the same real-time 3D animated perspective based on Big City Greens.

ESPN would present another youth-oriented alternative broadcast of a Capitals–Rangers game on April 5, 2026, known as the Inside Out Classic. Like with the prior Big City Greens Classic broadcasts, the game was simulcasted on Disney Channel, Disney XD, Disney+ and ESPN+. The 3D animated perspective for this broadcast was based on the Pixar franchise Inside Out.

== On-air staff ==
=== Current personalities ===
==== Studio hosts ====
1. Steve Levy: studio host (1993–2004), lead studio host (2021–present), play-by-play (1993–2004, 2021–present)
2. John Buccigross: alternate studio host (1998–2004, 2021–present), play-by-play (2021–present)

==== Studio analysts ====
1. Mark Messier: lead studio analyst/color commentator (2021–present)
2. P. K. Subban: lead studio analyst/color commentator (2022–present)
3. Kevin Weekes: color commentator, rinkside reporter, studio analyst, and insider (2021–present)
4. A. J. Mleczko: color commentator/studio analyst (2021–present)
5. Ray Ferraro: studio analyst (2002–2004, 2024–present), lead ice-level analyst (2021–present)
6. T. J. Oshie: studio analyst/ice-level analyst (2025–present)
7. Erik Johnson: ice-level analyst/studio analyst (2025–present)
8. Meghan Chayka: analytics and draft expert (2022–present)

==== Play-by-play ====
1. Sean McDonough: play-by-play (1993–1994, 1999–2000, 2002–2004), lead play-by-play (2021–present)
2. Bob Wischusen: No. 2 play-by-play (2021–present)
3. Mike Monaco: No. 3 play-by-play (2022–present)
4. Steve Levy: studio host (1993–2004), lead studio host (2021–present), play-by-play (1993–2004, 2021–present)
5. John Buccigross: alternate studio host (1998–2004, 2021–present), play-by-play (2021–present)
6. Roxy Bernstein: play-by-play (2022–present)

==== Color commentators (booth and ice-level) ====
1. Ray Ferraro: lead ice-level analyst (2021–present), studio analyst (2002–2004, 2024–present)
2. Erik Johnson: #2 ice-level analyst (2025–present)
3. Kevin Weekes: color commentator, rinkside reporter, studio analyst, and insider (2021–present), No. 2 ice-level analyst (2025–2026)
4. A. J. Mleczko: color commentator/studio analyst (2021–present)
5. Cassie Campbell-Pascall: No. 4 color commentator (2021–present)
6. Mark Messier: lead studio analyst/color commentator (2021–present)
7. P. K. Subban: lead studio analyst/color commentator (2022–present)
8. T. J. Oshie: studio analyst/color commentator/ice-level analyst (2025–present)

==== Rinkside reporters ====
1. Emily Kaplan: lead rinkside reporter (2021–present), lead insider (2021–present)
2. Leah Hextall: play-by-play (2021–2023), No. 2 rinkside reporter (2021–present), alternate studio host (2024)
3. Kevin Weekes: color commentator, rinkside reporter, studio analyst, and insider (2021–present)
4. Stormy Buonantony: rinkside reporter (2024–present)

==== Rules analyst ====
1. Dave Jackson: rules analyst (2021–present)

==== Insiders ====
1. Emily Kaplan: lead rinkside reporter (2021–present), lead insider (2021–present)
2. Greg Wyshynski: insider (2021–present)
3. Kevin Weekes: color commentator, rinkside reporter, studio analyst, and insider (2021–present)

Records
Preceded by USA Network	NHL pay television carrier in the United States; 1985–1988	Succeeded by SportsChannel America
Preceded by SportsChannel America	NHL pay television carrier in the United States; 1992–2004	Succeeded by OLN/Versus/NBCSN
Preceded by OLN/Versus/NBCSN	NHL pay television carrier in the United States; 2021–present with TNT	Succeeded by Incumbent
