= Dan Kelly (sportscaster) =

Canadian sportscaster (1936–1989)

- Born: Patrick Daniel Kelly; September 17, 1936; Ottawa, Ontario, Canada
- Died: February 10, 1989 (aged 52); Chesterfield, Missouri, U.S.
- Occupation: Sportscaster
- Years active: 1958–1989
- Known for: Play by Play voice of the St. Louis Blues (1968-89)
- Children: 6; Including John and Dan P.

Patrick Daniel Kelly (September 17, 1936 – February 10, 1989) was a Canadian-born sportscaster best known for his TV/radio play-by-play coverage of the St. Louis Blues of the National Hockey League, from 1968 until his death 21 years later, as well as for his national television work on NHL telecasts in both the United States and Canada.

== Broadcasting NHL games on national television ==
In addition to his 21 seasons broadcasting the Blues, Kelly broadcast NHL games on national television in the United States and Canada for many years. He broadcast 16 Stanley Cup Final series between 1969 and 1988, working for CBS, the NHL Network, the Hughes Television Network, the USA Network, CBC, CTV, and Global. In addition, he also called select games on ESPN in 1985 and was the lead play-by-play announcer of the 1987 Canada Cup and at the 1988 Winter Olympics in Calgary, both for CTV.

=== Memorable calls ===
He was noted for his ability to project above the roaring crowds at the NHL arenas. He acknowledged that his booming call, "HE SHOOTS, HE SCORES!" was patterned after that of the famous long-time NHL announcer Foster Hewitt.

Kelly called two of the most famous goals in hockey history. One was Bobby Orr's Cup-winning overtime goal in 1970:

Bobby Orr... behind the net to Sanderson to OOOORR! BOBBY ORR! … scores, and the Boston Bruins have won the Stanley Cup!

The other was Mario Lemieux's goal with 1:26 remaining in the decisive game 3 of 1987 Canada Cup:

Hawerchuk wins it ahead, here's Lemieux poking it to center. Lemieux ahead to Gretzky, has Murphy with him on a 2-on-1. To Lemieux. In on goal. He shoots! HE SCORES!! Mario Lemieux, with 1:26 remaining!

He also called another Stanley Cup-winning goal for CBS as Bob Nystrom won the Cup for the Islanders in 1980:

Islanders' number 10, Henning to Tonelli. Here's Tonelli with Nystrom. The pass to Nystrom – HE SCORES! BOB NYSTROM! And the New York Islanders have won the Stanley Cup!

He also called a Stanley Cup semifinal in 1971 at Chicago Stadium (nicknamed "The Madhouse on Madison"). When the Black Hawks' Bobby Hull scored an empty-netter to clinch the series, he yelled, "I can feel our broadcast booth shaking! That's the kind of place Chicago Stadium is right now!"

== Other sports broadcasting ==
Besides hockey, Kelly also broadcast for NFL on CBS, as well as Missouri Tigers football, St. Louis Cardinals baseball, and St. Louis Cardinals football for St. Louis radio station KMOX at different times in his career. He also broadcast the 1964 Grey Cup from Toronto along with Don Wittman and Bud Grant.

== Death and honors ==
Kelly died on February 10, 1989, from lung cancer. His sons, John and Dan P., have been broadcasting NHL games for various NHL franchises, including the Blues and Los Angeles Kings, for whom John is currently doing the television play-by-play.

Several months after his death, Kelly was the posthumous recipient of the Lester Patrick Trophy and the Foster Hewitt Memorial Award. In 2006, the St. Louis Blues dedicated the press box at the Enterprise Center in honor of him. In 2017, he was honored with the Missouri Broadcasters' Hall of Fame, and he was elected to the National Sports Media Association Hall of Fame six years later.

Sporting positions
Preceded by Jay Randolph; Jack Buck	St. Louis Blues radio/television play-by-play announcer 1968–1989	Succeeded by Ken Wilson
Preceded by Jim Gordon; Tim Ryan; Marv Albert and Ted Darling; Bob Cole	American network television play-by-play announcer 1969–1972; 1978–1980 (with Danny Gallivan, Chico Resch, and Dick Irvin Jr. in 1978; Kelly called the games in Boston and hosted games in Montreal; with Gallivan, Irvin, Gary Dornhoefer, Bobby Orr, and Gerry Pinder in 1979; with Bob Cole and Jim Robson for the first five games; with Tim Ryan for Game 6; Kelly called the first and third periods and overtime); 1982–1985 (with Al Albert in 1985; Kelly called the games in Philadelphia)	Succeeded by Marv Albert, Ted Darling, and Tim Ryan; Bob Cole; Sam Rosen and Ken Wilson
Preceded by Danny Gallivan; Bob Cole; Jim Robson	Canadian network television play-by-play announcer 1978–1980 (with Danny Gallivan, Chico Resch, and Dick Irvin Jr. in 1978; Kelly called the games in Boston and hosted games in Montreal; with Gallivan, Irvin, Gary Dornhoefer, Bobby Orr, and Gerry Pinder in 1979; with Bob Cole and Jim Robson for the first five games in 1980); 1985–1988	Succeeded by Danny Gallivan; Jim Robson; Bob Cole
