= John Kelly (sportscaster) =

Canadian sportscaster, born 1960

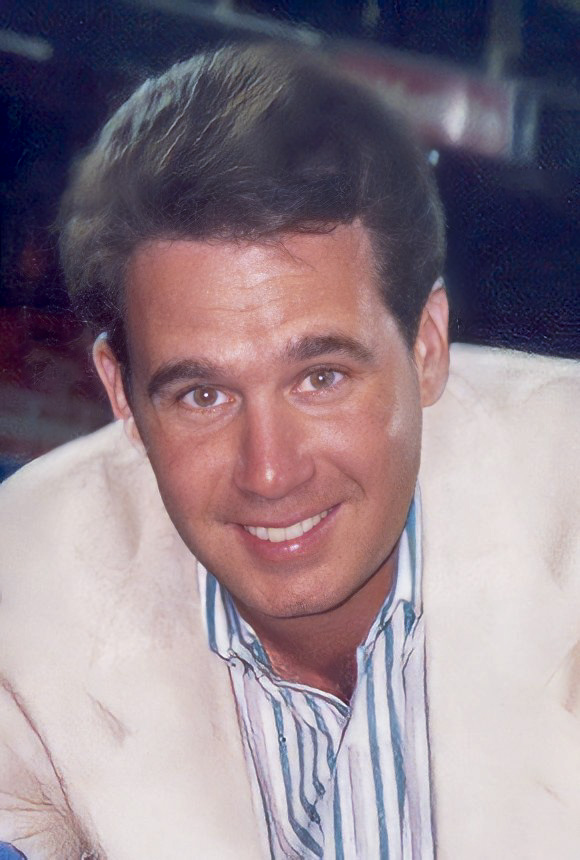
Kelly in 2010

John Kelly (born July 25, 1960, in Ottawa, Ontario) is a hockey play-by-play announcer for the Los Angeles Kings of the National Hockey League. He previously spent 21 seasons with the St. Louis Blues.

Kelly began his career with the St. Catharines Saints, then spent three years with the Adirondack Red Wings. He also subbed for Marv Albert on Rangers broadcasts during the 1988–990 season. On November 17, 1988, Kelly joined his father, St. Louis Blue broadcaster Dan Kelly, in the booth for his final NHL game. Dan Kelly died on February 10, 1989 and John Kelly joined the Blues' broadcast team for the 1989–90 NHL season He remained on the job until summer 1992, when he joined the expansion Tampa Bay Lightning. Three years later, he joined the Colorado Avalanche, who were moving from Quebec City, where they had spent 23 seasons as the Nordiques. He documented two Stanley Cup Championships in Denver, in 1995–96 and again in 2000–01. He became well known in Denver for his proclamation, "Thank you, thank you, thank you!!!!" after a big score by the Avs and, "SAVE BY ROY!" after a good save from former Avalanche goaltender Patrick Roy. He left the Avalanche after the 2003–04 season to rejoin the Blues on their telecasts after the 2004–05 NHL lockout and finally called the 2019 Stanley Cup Finals on local radio in the second period of every game.

On January 13, 2000, he was confronted by Pittsburgh Penguins coach Herb Brooks for suggesting that Matthew Barnaby faked an injury after being hit by Alexei Gusarov with 27 seconds left. Brooks was suspended two games for that confrontation on January 18, having been suspended indefinitely since January 15. Gusarov was suspended two games for the hit the day before.

His younger brother Dan P. Kelly was the Blues' radio announcer from 1997 to 2000, before spending the next four seasons with the Columbus Blue Jackets.

In addition to the Blues, he also worked the 2006 NHL playoffs on Outdoor Life Network (now NBCSN). During the mid-1990s, he worked on select regional telecasts for the NHL on Fox. In the 2008 Stanley Cup playoffs, he substituted for Mike Haynes, the broadcaster who took over his play-by-play role for the Avalanche, on Altitude Sports and Entertainment, due to Haynes' health problems before he returned next season.

On July 10, 2025, it was announced that Kelly's contract would not be renewed. He will be replaced by Chris Kerber, current radio play-by-play announcer, in a simulcast over FanDuel Sports Network Midwest and 101ESPN Radio. In September 2025, he replaced the retired Nick Nickson as play-by-play announcer for the Los Angeles Kings.
