= List of St. Louis Cardinals broadcasters =

== Current broadcasters and announcers ==
=== Broadcasters ===
- Radio: KMOX AM 1120 (2011–present)
- Cable TV: Cardinals.TV (2026–present)

=== Announcers ===
==== Radio ====
- John Rooney (Play-by-play; 2006–present)
- Ricky Horton (Analyst; 1997–present)
- Mike Claiborne (Analyst; 2006–present)
- Jim Jackson (Chief engineer & production coordinator; 1998–present)
- Polo Ascencio (Spanish; 2016–present)
- Bengie Molina (Spanish; 2016–present)

==== Cable TV (152 games) ====
- Chip Caray (Play-by-play; 2023–present)
- Al Hrabosky (Commentator; 1985–present)
- Jim Hayes (Host & reporter; 2001–present)
- Brad Thompson (Analyst; 2018–present)
- Scott Warmann (Host; 2016–present)
- Mark Sweeney (Analyst; 2025–present)
- Dani Wexelman (Host & reporter; 2026–present)

== Past broadcasters and announcers ==
=== Radio ===
- KMOX AM 1120 (1926–1940, 1955–2005, 2011–present)
- KWK AM 1380 (1928–1943)
- WEW AM 770 (1944–1948)
- WIL AM 1430 (1945–1947, 1949–1953)
- KXOK AM 630 (1954)
- KTRS AM 550 (2006–2010)

=== Television (Broadcast) ===
- KSD-TV/KSDK Channel 5 (1949–1987, 2007–2010)
- KPLR-TV 11 (1988–2006)

=== Television (Cable) ===
- Sports Time (1984)
- Cardinals Cable Network (1985–1989)
- Prime Sports Midwest (1990–1995)
- Fox Sports Midwest (1996–1998, 2008–2020)
- Fox Sports Net Midwest (1999–2003)
- FSN Midwest (2004–2007)
- Bally Sports Midwest (2021–2024)
- FanDuel Sports Midwest (2025)

=== Announcers ===
- Garnett Marks (1927–1928)
- France Laux (1929–1943, 1945)
- Johnny O'Hara (1936–1947)
- Jim Bottomley (1939)
- Dizzy Dean (1941–1946)
- Harry Caray (1945–1969)
- Gabby Street (1945–1950)
- Stretch Miller (1950–1953)
- Gus Mancuso (1951–1953)
- Jack Buck (1954–1958, 1961–2001)
- Milo Hamilton (1954)
- Joe Garagiola (1955–1962)
- Bud Blattner (1960–1961)
- Jerry Gross (1961, 1963–1967)
- Bill Wilkerson (1969–2006)
- Jim Woods (1970–1971)
- Mike Shannon (1972–2021)
- Bob Starr (1972–1979)
- Mike Walden (1972)
- Jay Randolph (1973–1987, 2007–2010)
- Harry Walker (1973)
- Bob Carpenter (Cable TV 1984, 1994–1996; Free TV 1993–2005)
- Dan Kelly (1980–1984)
- Red Rush (1984)
- Al Hrabosky (1985–2018)
- Ken Wilson (Cable and Free TV 1985–1990)
- Joe Buck (1991–2007)
- George Grande (Free TV 1991–1992)
- Bob Ramsey (1997–1998, 2004)
- Ozzie Smith (1997–1999)
- Rich Gould (1998–1999)
- Dan McLaughlin (1999–2022)
- Joel Meyers (2002)
- Wayne Hagin (Radio 2003–2005, Free TV 2006)
- Tim McCarver (2014–2019)
- Jim Edmonds (2013–2024)

== See also ==
- List of current Major League Baseball announcers
