= John Carney =

John or Jack Carney may refer to:

== Politics ==
- John Carney (Delaware politician) (born 1956), former governor of Delaware and former U.S. Representative
- John Patrick Carney (born 1976), Democratic member of the Ohio House of Representatives
- John Carney (Kentucky politician) (1969–2021), member of the Kentucky House of Representatives

== Sports ==
- John Carney (American football) (born 1964), American football placekicker
- Jack Carney (baseball) (1866–1925), professional baseball player
- Jack Carney (footballer) (1909–1981), Australian rules footballer

== Other people ==
- John Carney (director) (born 1972), Irish film and TV director
- John Carney (magician) (born 1958), sleight of hand artist, author and actor
- John Carney (radio), radio talk show host on KTRS in St. Louis
- John F. Carney (born 1941), chancellor of Missouri University of Science and Technology

== See also ==
- John Carney House, a historic house in Troy, Illinois
- John Carney Agricultural Complex, a historic farm complex in Greenville, New Castle County, Delaware
- Jonathan Carney, violinist, violist, and conductor
- John Cairney (disambiguation)
