= Jack Buck =

American sportscaster (1924–2002)

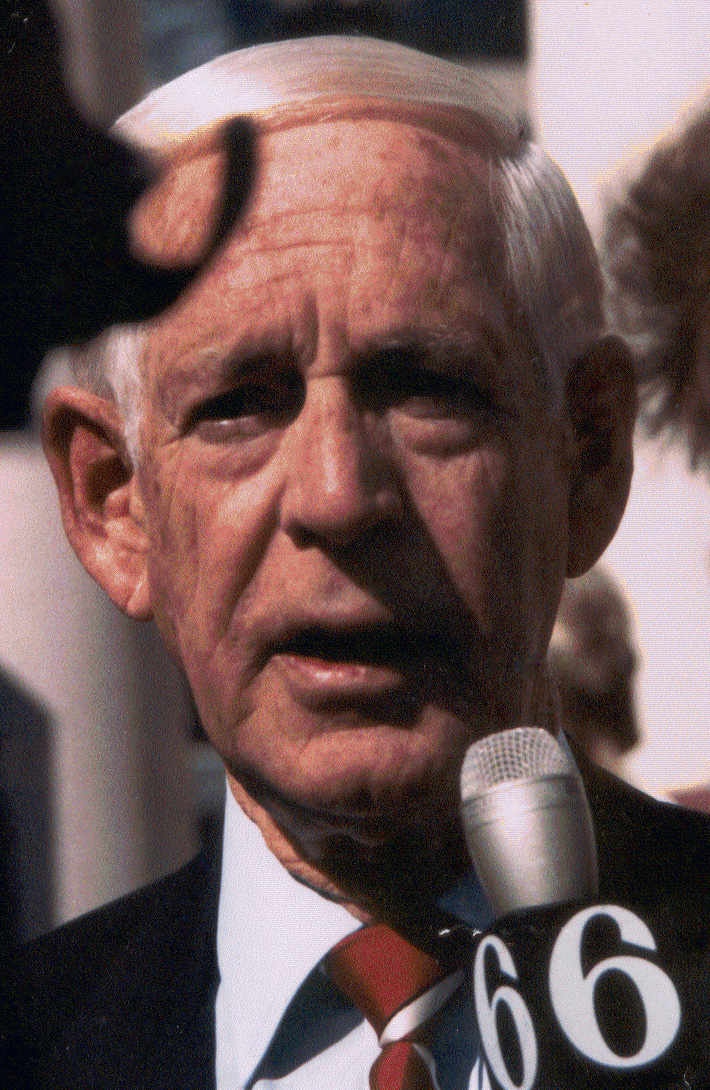
- Buck in 1987
- Born: John Francis Buck; August 21, 1924; Holyoke, Massachusetts, U.S.
- Died: June 18, 2002 (aged 77); St. Louis, Missouri, U.S.
- Resting place: Jefferson Barracks National Cemetery, Missouri
- Education: Ohio State University
- Occupation: Sportscaster
- Years active: 1950–2001
- Spouses: Alyce Larson (m. 1948; div. 1969); Carole Lintzenich (m. 1969)
- Children: 8, including Joe
- Awards: Name honored by St. Louis Cardinals; St. Louis Cardinals Hall of Fame
- Military career
- Allegiance: United States
- Branch: U.S. Army
- Service years: 1943–1946
- Rank: Corporal
- Unit: 9th Infantry Division
- Conflicts: World War II – European theater
- Awards: Purple Heart

John Francis Buck (August 21, 1924 – June 18, 2002) was an American sportscaster, best known for his work announcing Major League Baseball games of the St. Louis Cardinals. His play-by-play work earned him recognition (or induction in some cases) from numerous halls of fame (Baseball, Pro Football, and Radio). He has also been inducted as a member of the St. Louis Cardinals Hall of Fame Museum. He was the father of ESPN sportscaster Joe Buck.

== Early years and military service ==
Buck was born in Holyoke, Massachusetts, the third of seven children of Earle and Kathleen Buck. His father was a railroad accountant who commuted weekly to New Jersey. From an early age, Buck dreamed of becoming a sports announcer with his early exposure to sports broadcasting coming from listening to Boston Red Sox baseball games announced by Fred Hoey.

Part of his childhood coincided with the Great Depression, and Buck remembered his family sometimes using a metal slug to keep a coin-operated gas meter going during the winter to provide heat for their home. In 1939, his family moved to Cleveland, Ohio to join their father, who had a job with the Erie Railroad. Soon after though, Buck's father died at the age of 49 due to uremic poisoning related to high blood pressure.

Buck planned to quit high school in 1941 to take a full-time job in an effort to support his family. Dissuaded by one of his teachers, Buck decided to finish high school, graduating from Lakewood High School in the winter of 1942. After graduation, he followed one of his friends and began working on an iron ore freight boat operated on the Great Lakes by the Cleveland Cliffs Iron Company.

Buck served on a 700-foot (210 m) steamer named The Sheadle, where he began as porter and was later promoted to night cook and baker. After performing various other shipping related jobs, Buck attempted to become a "deck watch." A required physical examination revealed Buck was color blind, unable to differentiate between the colors green and brown. Ineligible for the promotion to deck watch, Buck subsequently became eligible for the military draft, and was drafted into the United States Army in June 1943.

After completion of his military service in 1946, Buck enrolled at (and graduated from) Ohio State University. His early sportscasting career included work for the minor league affiliates of the St. Louis Cardinals. In 1954, he was promoted to radio play-by-play of Cardinal games on KXOK radio; the team's radio broadcasts would move in 1955 to KMOX. Buck maintained this position for nearly all of the next 47 years. He was known in St. Louis for his trademark phrase "That's a winner!", which was said after every game that the Cardinals had won.

In addition to his work with the Cardinals, Buck also earned assignments on many national sportscasts, including radio coverage of 18 Super Bowls and 11 World Series. Some of his famous play-by-play calls include the dramatic walk-off home runs hit by Ozzie Smith in Game 5 of the 1985 National League Championship Series, by Kirk Gibson in Game 1 of the 1988 World Series, and by Kirby Puckett in Game 6 of the 1991 World Series.

The later part of his career found him working side by side in the Cardinals booth with his son Joe Buck, who also has risen to national sportscasting prominence.

== Military service ==
After graduating from high school, he worked on large shipping boats that traveled the Great Lakes. Buck was drafted into the U.S. Army in June 1943. The physicality of Buck's work on the Great Lakes left in him good physical condition at the time he entered the Army. Buck, who was 19 years old, stood 5 feet 11 inches (1.80 m) tall, and weighed 165 pounds (75 kg). His first assignment was anti-aircraft training, and was sent to Fort Eustis, Virginia to undergo his 13-week basic training regimen.

After completing his basic training in 1943, Buck was designated as an instructor, and assigned the rank of corporal. In addition to his instructor duties, Buck participated in boxing as a form of recreation. In February 1945, Buck shipped out to the European theater of the war, where he was assigned to K Company, 47th Infantry Regiment, 9th Infantry Division.

During the night of March 7, 1945, Buck and his compatriots crossed the Ludendorff Bridge at the town of Remagen, Germany. United States forces' successful capture of this bridge led to the Battle of Remagen from March 7–25. On the morning of March 15, Buck was the squad leader of a patrol that came under German fire in the Remagen zone. Wounded in his left forearm and leg by fragmentation, Buck received medical treatment on the battlefield from the only medic K company had at that time, Frank Borghi. He received further medical treatment at the 177th General Army Hospital in Le Mans, France, where he was awarded the Purple Heart. Buck recovered, and rejoined his outfit sometime after German forces had surrendered.

Declining to re-enlist, and turning down requests to enroll in the Officers Training School, Buck joined his compatriots in guard duty of German prisoners of war. Buck received orders to ship home in April 1946, effectively ending his military service.

== College ==
After returning to the United States, Buck worked in various industrial-related jobs. When his friend Bill Theil told Buck he needed a roommate to attend Ohio State University with him, Buck decided on the spot to join Theil and enroll at Ohio State in Columbus. The suddenness of Buck's decision meant he had no corresponding paperwork that could be used to formally enroll at the university, so Buck attended classes of his own choosing until he was able to formally enroll.

Buck majored in radio speech and minored in Spanish. He worked several jobs while attending college, including one position at an all-night gas station. He crafted his play-by-play skills broadcasting Ohio State basketball games.

After college, he called games for the Columbus Red Birds, a Triple-A (American Association) affiliate of the St. Louis Cardinals, in 1950–51. He spent the 1953 season as voice of another AAA Cardinals affiliate, the International League Rochester Red Wings on WHEC radio. His work there earned him an invitation to join the big-league Cardinals' broadcast team in St. Louis the following season.

== Broadcasting career ==
=== St. Louis Cardinals ===
Jack Buck was honored alongside the retired numbers of the St. Louis Cardinals in 2002.

Buck started broadcasting Cardinals games for KMOX radio in 1954, teaming with Harry Caray, Milo Hamilton (1954), and Joe Garagiola (from 1955). Buck was dropped from the Cardinals booth in 1959 to make room for Buddy Blattner; the following year, he called Saturday Game of the Week telecasts for ABC. Buck was re-hired by the Cardinals in 1961 after Blattner departed; Garagiola left after 1962, leaving Caray and Buck as the team's broadcast voices from 1963 through 1969.

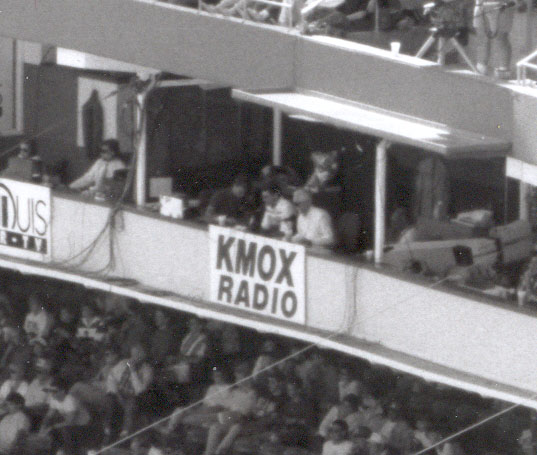
Buck and Shannon announcing a Cardinals game at Busch, 1992

After Caray was fired by the Cardinals following the 1969 season, Buck ascended to the team's lead play-by-play role.

Smith corks one into right, down the line! It may go!! ... Go crazy, folks! Go crazy! It's a home run, and the Cardinals have won the game, by the score of 3 to 2, on a home run by the Wizard! Go crazy!

— Jack Buck calling Ozzie Smith's game winning home run off Tom Niedenfuer in game 5 of the 1985 NLCS

Buck teamed with ex-Yankees and Pirates announcer Jim Woods in 1970–71. In 1972, retired Cardinals third baseman Mike Shannon joined Buck in the broadcast booth, beginning a 28-year partnership. On Cardinals broadcasts, Buck routinely punctuated St. Louis victories with the expression, "That's a winner!"

In addition to Joe, Buck has three daughters who worked in broadcasting. Two are from his first marriage - Bonnie Buck, who currently works in television in Los Angeles, and Christine Buck, who started her career at KPLR-TV in St. Louis. From his second marriage is Julie Buck on KYKY 98.1 in St. Louis (she now works at KTRS-AM 550, also in St. Louis). In addition, Buck's younger brother, Bob Buck was a sportscaster and sports director at KMOX/KMOV-TV in St. Louis.

Buck was well-respected in the St. Louis community, where he lived and regularly volunteered time to host charity events. In addition to his sportscasting work, Buck served as the original host of the KMOX interview/call-in program At Your Service beginning in 1960. His guests on the program included Eleanor Roosevelt.

Buck can be heard calling a (fictional) 1964 Cardinals broadcast in the 1988 film Mississippi Burning, and makes a cameo appearance in a 1998 episode of the television series Arliss. He also lent his voice to R.B.I. Baseball '95 and Relief Pitcher.

=== Football ===
Jack Buck was also a renowned football broadcaster. In 1964, he began calling National Football League games for CBS television, following a four-year stint doing telecasts of the rival American Football League for ABC, which included the 1962 AFL Championship game between the Houston Oilers and the Dallas Texans—at that point the longest game ever played. Buck called Chicago Bears games in his first two CBS seasons, then switched to Dallas Cowboys games, including the famous "Ice Bowl" championship game in 1967. After the network moved away from dedicated team announcers, Buck continued to call regional NFL action through 1974, as well as several NFC Championship Games and Super Bowl IV. He also called the 1965 Cotton Bowl Classic for CBS television and several later Cotton Bowl games for CBS Radio.

In 1975, Buck temporarily left his Cardinals baseball duties in order to host the NBC pregame show, GrandStand, alongside Bryant Gumbel. In the 1976 and 1977 seasons, he called regional NFL play-by-play for NBC. On August 16, 1976, Buck called the first-ever NFL game played outside of the United States, a preseason exhibition between the St. Louis Cardinals and San Diego Chargers held at Korakuen Stadium in Tokyo, Japan. (Buck also worked NBC's backup Game of the Week during the 1976 baseball season before returning to the Cardinals full-time in 1977.)

Buck served as the CBS Radio voice of Monday Night Football (teaming with Hank Stram) for nearly two decades (1978–1984 and again from 1987–1995 after CBS regained the radio rights from NBC). Ironically, in 1970 ABC's Roone Arledge had asked via telephone about Buck's interests in becoming the first television play-by-play announcer for Monday Night Football, but because of personal animosity surrounding his previous stint with the network, Buck would not return their phone call. (The television play-by-play role would go to Keith Jackson instead, and later to Buck's CBS colleague, Frank Gifford.)

In addition to MNF, Buck called numerous playoff games for CBS Radio, including 17 Super Bowls (the most of any announcer). Buck also served as a local radio broadcaster for the football Cardinals in 1980 and 1981, and returned to calling Sunday NFL games for CBS television from 1982 to 1987.

Late in the 1990 NFL season, Buck's onetime CBS broadcasting partner, Pat Summerall, was hospitalized with a bleeding ulcer after vomiting on a plane during a flight after a game, and was out for a considerable amount of time. While Verne Lundquist replaced Summerall on games with lead analyst John Madden, Buck (who was at the time the network's lead Major League Baseball announcer) filled in for Lundquist, teaming with Dan Fouts to call two games (both of which coincidentally featured the Cardinals, who had moved from St. Louis to Arizona by that time).

=== Other sports ===
While much better known for his baseball and football commentary, Jack Buck was also the original voice of the St. Louis Blues of the National Hockey League. Buck was paired with Jay Randolph and Gus Kyle on Blues broadcasts and covered the 1968 Stanley Cup Finals for KMOX radio.

He was succeeded after one season by broadcaster Dan Kelly. Buck also broadcast for the St. Louis Hawks and Rochester Royals of the National Basketball Association, and called professional wrestling, boxing, and bowling at various times in his career.

Showing his versatility, Buck also hosted the syndicated Top Star Bowling during the early 1960s.

=== ABC and CBS baseball ===
Jack Buck (left) with Ralph Kiner at the 1987 Hall of Fame induction ceremony.

In 1960, Buck along with Carl Erskine broadcast a series of late-afternoon Saturday games on ABC. They were the lead announcing crew for this series, which lasted one season.

Despite temporarily losing the Game of the Week package in 1961, ABC still televised several games in prime time (with Buck returning to call the action). This occurred as Roger Maris was poised to tie and subsequently break Babe Ruth's regular season home run record of 60.

For a number of years Buck called baseball events nationally for the CBS Radio network, teaming with Brent Musburger to call the All-Star Game in 1976 and with Jerry Coleman to call the NLCS from 1979–1982. From 1983–1989, Buck variously teamed with Sparky Anderson, Bill White, and Johnny Bench to call World Series radio broadcasts on CBS Radio, including appearances by the Cardinals in 1985 and 1987. (As a Cardinals announcer, Buck had previously called the World Series in 1968 (on NBC Radio) and 1982 (locally on KMOX).) Buck, along with his CBS Radio colleagues Johnny Bench and John Rooney, was on hand at San Francisco's Candlestick Park on October 17, 1989, when the Loma Prieta earthquake hit. After the 6.9 magnitude quake rocked the Bay Area, Buck told the listening audience:

I must say about Johnny Bench, folks, if he moved that fast when he played, he would have never hit into a double play. I never saw anybody move that fast in my life.

He is most famous for his coast-to-coast radio call of Kirk Gibson's game-winning home run in the bottom of the 9th inning of Game 1 of the 1988 World Series and his disbelief at Gibson knocking it out while hobbled by injuries to his right hamstring and left knee. His call of the play is so famous that it is sometimes played over the television footage of the play. The television call was handled by long-time Dodgers announcer Vin Scully on NBC.

This was Buck's call. It begins here with Buck speculating on what might happen if Gibson manages to reach base:

... then you would run for Gibson and have Sax batting. But, we have a big 3–2 pitch coming here from Eckersley. Gibson swings, and a fly ball to deep right field! This is gonna be a home run! Unbelievable! A home run for Gibson! And the Dodgers have won the game, five to four; I don't believe what I just saw!

The last sentence is often remembered and quoted by fans. Buck followed it with,

I don't believe what I just saw! Is this really happening, Bill?

Buck concluded his comments on Gibson's amazing feat with this thought:

One of the most remarkable finishes to any World Series Game ... a one-handed home run by Kirk Gibson! And the Dodgers have won it ... five to four; and I'm stunned, Bill. I have seen a lot of dramatic finishes in a lot of sports, but this one might top almost every other one.

Buck was not intended to be the main play-by-play announcer for CBS baseball telecasts when the network acquired the sport from NBC and ABC. Originally assigned to the network's #2 crew (and therefore, work with Jim Kaat), he was promoted at practically the last minute after Brent Musburger was fired on April Fools' Day of 1990.

After two years of calling baseball telecasts (including the Saturday afternoon Game of the Week, All-Star Game, National League Championship Series, and World Series), Buck was dismissed by CBS. The official reasoning behind Buck's ouster was that he simply had poor chemistry with lead analyst Tim McCarver.

Buck was soon replaced by Boston Red Sox announcer Sean McDonough. Buck later noted that "CBS never got that baseball play-by-play draws word-pictures. All they knew was that football stars analysts. So they said, 'Let McCarver run the show ... In television, all they want you to do is shut up. I'm not very good at shutting up." Buck was criticized by some for his alleged habit of predicting plays on air.

Buck made controversial statements about singer Bobby Vinton prior to Game 4 of the 1990 National League Championship Series. After Vinton muffed the lyrics of "The Star-Spangled Banner" in his home town of Pittsburgh, Buck lightly referenced Vinton's Polish heritage ("Well, when you're Polish & live in Pittsburgh, you can do anything you want with the words!"). Buck soon got death threats from Pittsburgh Pirates fans, who even went as far as leaving a footprint on Buck's hotel pillow. The next day, CBS Sports executive producer Ted Shaker spotted Buck in the hotel lobby and told Buck that he was in trouble.

The final baseball play that Jack Buck narrated for CBS television was Gene Larkin's game winning bloop single in Game 7 of the 1991 World Series.

The Twins are going to win the World Series! The Twins have won it! It's a base hit! It's a 1–0 10th inning victory!

== Final years ==
Over the course of the 1990s, Buck decided to reduce his schedule to calling only Cardinals home games (or 81 games a year unless there was a special occurrence). Health concerns played a factor in this, as Buck suffered from such ailments as Parkinson's disease, diabetes, requiring a pacemaker, cataracts, sciatica, and vertigo. Buck once joked, "I wish I'd get Alzheimer's, then I could forget I've got all the other stuff." In 1998, the Cardinals dedicated a bust of Buck that showed him smiling with a hand cupping his left ear. In 1999, he lent his name to a restaurant venture called J. Buck's, with the restaurant's name being shared with son Joe and daughter Julie.

In the final years of his life, Buck became recognized for writing poetry, culminating in national attention for his poem "For America", written after the terrorist attacks of September 11, 2001. One of Buck's final public appearances was on September 17, 2001, at Busch Memorial Stadium in St. Louis. It was the first night that Major League Baseball resumed after the terrorist attacks of September 11. Sick with lung cancer and also showing the signs of Parkinson's disease, Buck looked frail and struggled to maintain his composure. He concluded by silencing critics who thought baseball had come back too soon: "I don't know about you, but as for me, the question has already been answered: Should we be here? Yes!"

Buck, who said he smoked Camel cigarettes for more than 40 years, underwent surgery for lung cancer in December 2001.

== Death ==
Jack Buck died on June 18, 2002, in St. Louis's Barnes-Jewish Hospital from a combination of illnesses. Buck, a heavy smoker, had stayed in the hospital since January 3 of that year to undergo treatment for lung cancer, Parkinson's disease, and to correct an intestinal blockage.

Within two hours of his death, fans were leaving flowers at the base of his bust outside Busch Stadium even though it was the middle of the night. The flags at St. Louis City Hall and the St. Louis County Government Center were lowered to half-staff, the local television news anchors all wore black suits for the next several days, and a public visitation was held in the stadium before the next baseball game after his death, with free admission to the game for all the mourners who filed past his coffin.

Buck was interred at Jefferson Barracks National Cemetery in south St. Louis County. His spot on the KMOX Cardinals broadcasts was subsequently filled by former Colorado Rockies announcer Wayne Hagin beginning in 2003. Hagin (who went on to the New York Mets after his stint in St. Louis) moved over to television for the 2006 season, and his spot was filled by one of Buck's protégés, former Chicago White Sox announcer John Rooney. Rooney and Hagin had worked together on radio for the White Sox in the late 1980s and 1990s.

Buck's youngest son, Joe, read the eulogy at his father's church funeral. Jack Buck was married twice and had eight children in all; five daughters and three sons. Joe Buck was the lead play-by-play announcer for both Major League Baseball and the NFL on the Fox network. Joe Buck has also done occasional local telecasts for the Cardinals as well as commercials for a local automobile dealership. Jack and Joe Buck are also the only father and son to call play-by-play of Super Bowl telecasts. The pair bookended a 50-year championship drought for the Kansas City Chiefs; Jack having called Super Bowl IV (the Chiefs' first Super Bowl victory), and Joe announcing the team's victory in Super Bowl LIV.

During postseason telecasts, Joe has often paid homage to his father by signing off with "We'll see you tomorrow night!". When the Cardinals won the 2006 World Series, Joe quoted his father again saying, "For the first time since 1982, St. Louis has a World Series winner!", referencing Jack's line when the Cardinals won in 1982, "And that's a winner! That's a winner! A World Series winner for the Cardinals!". During the 2011 Series, Joe punctuated David Freese's 11th inning walk-off homer for the Cardinals in Game 6 with "We will see you ... tomorrow night!", near similar to the 1991 Puckett home run description, a call he said he did to celebrate his father. When the Cardinals won Game 7, he did not quote his father.

== Awards and recognition ==
Buck received the Ford C. Frick Award for broadcasting from the National Baseball Hall of Fame in 1987, and the Pete Rozelle Radio-Television Award from the Pro Football Hall of Fame in 1996.

The Missouri Sports Hall of Fame inducted Buck twice, as a media personality (1980) and Missouri sports legend (2000). The National Sportscasters and Sportswriters Association named Buck as Missouri Sportscaster of the Year 22 times, and inducted him into its Hall of Fame in 1990. Buck was also inducted into the American Sportscasters Association Hall of Fame in 1990, the Missouri Athletic Club Hall of Fame in 1993, the National Radio Hall of Fame in 1995, and the NAB Broadcasting Hall of Fame in 2005. The American Sportscasters Association ranked Buck 11th in its listing of the Top 50 Sportscasters of All Time in 2009.

Buck is honored with a star on the St. Louis Walk of Fame.

A bronze statue of him was erected at the entrance to Busch Memorial Stadium in 1998 (and moved to a new location outside the current Busch Stadium in 2007).

A section of I-64/US-40 in St. Louis is named the Jack Buck Memorial Highway in his honor.

In January, 2014, the Cardinals announced Buck among 22 former players and personnel to be inducted into the St. Louis Cardinals Hall of Fame Museum for the inaugural class of 2014.

The Jack Buck Award, presented by the Missouri Athletic Club "in recognition of the enthusiastic and dedicated support of sports in St. Louis", is named in his honor.

Actor William H. Macy portrayed Buck in the 2025 film Soul on Fire.

== See also ==
- St. Louis Cardinals Hall of Fame Museum
- List of St. Louis Cardinals broadcasters

| Preceded by Al Michaels | World Series network television play-by-play announcer 1990–1991 | Succeeded by Sean McDonough |
| Preceded by Vin Scully | World Series national radio play-by-play announcer 1983–1989 | Succeeded by Vin Scully |
| Preceded by Lindsey Nelson; Don Criqui | Monday Night Football national radio play-by-play announcer 1978–1984; 1987–1995 | Succeeded by Don Criqui; Howard David |
| Preceded by none | NFL on CBS lead play-by-play announcer 1968 | Succeeded by Ray Scott |
| Preceded by Ray Scott | Super Bowl television play-by-play announcer (NFC package carrier); 1969 | Succeeded by Ray Scott |
| Preceded by none | Studio host, NFL on NBC; 1975 (with Bryant Gumbel) | Succeeded by Lee Leonard |
| Preceded by Dizzy Dean and Lindsey Nelson; Vin Scully | Lead Major League Baseball Game of the Week television play-by-play announcer 1960 (with CBS' Dizzy Dean and NBC's Lindsey Nelson); 1990–1991 | Succeeded by Dizzy Dean and Lindsey Nelson; Sean McDonough |
