= Charles Jaco =

American journalist

- Born: August 21, 1950 (age 76); Poplar Bluff, Missouri, U.S.
- Education: University of Chicago (1973); Columbia University (M.S., 1976)
- Occupations: Journalist; writer; commentator
- Employer(s): WXRT, NBC Radio, CNN; KMOX, KTVI, KTRS, St. Louis American
- Known for: The Jaco Report

Charles Jaco (born August 21, 1950) is an American journalist and author, best known for his coverage of Iraq's invasion of Kuwait and the ensuing Gulf War. Jaco was born in Poplar Bluff, Missouri.

He graduated from the University of Chicago in 1973 and earned a master's degree from Columbia University in 1976. In 1976, he began his broadcast career with WXRT radio in Chicago, Illinois.

He worked for NBC Radio (identified on air as "C.D. Jaco") from 1979 until 1988, winning a Peabody Award in 1980 for a report on the religious right. In 1987, he was badly beaten by the security forces of Panamanian dictator Manuel Noriega. In late 1988, he became a correspondent for CNN. In 1989, while covering allegations of electoral fraud by the Panamanian government, Jaco was visited by vigilantes of Noriega. He fled the country with the aid of the U.S. military. While covering the Gulf War for CNN in 1991, he proposed to fellow CNN correspondent Pat Neal. He left CNN in 1994 and joined KMOX.

He authored Dead Air, a novel about the Gulf War, and Live Shot, a novel set in Cuba. In 2002, he authored The Complete Idiot's Guide to the Gulf War, and in 2003 co-authored The Complete Idiot's Guide to the Politics of Oil. In 2003 he became a reporter and anchor for KTVI television in St. Louis, Missouri, while hosting the station's The Jaco Report. In 2009, he began work at the radio station KTRS 550, doing a daily morning talk show, also titled The Jaco Report. In February 2010 Jaco allegedly bumped into conservative blogger Adam Sharp. Based on Sharp's video of the encounter, the city prosecutor declined to pursue charges against Jaco.

In October 2010, Jaco was replaced by J.C. Corcoran at KTRS. In August 2012 Jaco interviewed then U.S. Representative and senatorial candidate Todd Akin on The Jaco Report in which Akin controversially claimed that women rarely become pregnant from "legitimate rape." Jaco left KTVI in 2014. Jaco writes regular columns for the St. Louis American.
