= John Carney (radio) =

American radio talk show host

John Carney is an American radio talk show host. He was named 2010 Best AM Radio Personality by the Riverfront Times.

== Career ==
Carney joined KTRS when it changed to a talk format in 1997, and worked the late morning slot until March 5, 1998. He then worked at KMOX in St. Louis, Missouri from 1999 to 2011. Carney worked at KEZK from 2011 to 2012. In June 2012, he rejoined KTRS. Together, with Martin Kilcoyne, he co-hosts the noon - 1 PM hour of The Martin Kilcoyne Show with John Carney. Then from 1PM-3PM he hosts the John Carney Show with his producer Josh Gilbert.

== Family ==
He is the son of Jack Carney.
