= Kelly Chase =

Canadian ice hockey player

- Born: October 25, 1967 (age 58) Porcupine Plain, Saskatchewan, Canada
- Height: 6 ft 0 in (183 cm)
- Weight: 200 lb (91 kg; 14 st 4 lb)
- Position: Right wing
- Shot: Right
- Played for: St. Louis Blues; Hartford Whalers; Toronto Maple Leafs
- NHL draft: Undrafted
- Playing career: 1988–2000

Kelly Chase (born October 25, 1967) is a Canadian former professional ice hockey player who played 458 games in the National Hockey League (NHL). He formerly served as the color commentator for St. Louis Blues radio broadcasts on KMOX radio in St. Louis. He is an uncle of Gregory Chase, who was drafted 188th overall by the Edmonton Oilers in the 2013 NHL entry draft.

== Playing career ==
Chase played a tough, physical game that earned him a reputation as an enforcer as well as many penalty minutes, a statistic in which he led the WHL in 1987–88 while playing with the Saskatoon Blades. Before that he played with the Humboldt Broncos of the Saskatchewan Junior Hockey League.

In spite of putting up decent numbers in his last year of Major Junior Hockey with 55 points in 70 games with the Saskatoon Blades in 1987-88, all NHL teams took a pass on Chase in the 1988 Entry Draft. His significant penalty minutes (343) may have contributed to many teams' reticence on drafting a player who would take numerous penalties. However, in 1988, Chase was signed as an undrafted free agent by the St. Louis Blues, and spent the majority of the three following seasons with the Peoria Rivermen of the IHL. Chase subsequently became a regular on the Blues' bench, with his play on the ice and quick wit off the ice earning him a spot in the hearts of Blues fans.

In 1994, Chase, along with Anthony Sansone Jr., founded and coached the Gateway Locomotives special hockey team. On March 30, 2017, the team was re-named as St. Louis Blues Special Hockey.

In January 1995, the Hartford Whalers selected Chase in the NHL Waiver Draft. In a 1996 interview with the Hartford Courant, he described the trade as “reporting to Shawshank prison”, in reference to the movie, “The Shawshank Redemption.” Chase would spend most of the next three seasons with the Whalers before being traded to the Toronto Maple Leafs in 1997. Prior to the 1997–98 season, Chase was reacquired by the Blues for future considerations. It was at the end of that season that Chase was awarded the King Clancy Memorial Trophy for his charity work with the Gateway Special Hockey Program, a program started by Chase in the early 1990s to help those with developmental disabilities participate in organized hockey.

Chase retired from professional hockey on July 28, 2000 and was the color commentator for St. Louis Blues radio broadcasts on KMOX until 2018. On December 15, 2008, Chase was presented with the 2008 Jack Buck Award, for his enthusiasm and dedication to sports in the city of St. Louis. Chase also participated on the Canadian Broadcasting's (CBC) Battle of the Blades which is figure skating version of Dancing With The Stars in 2010.

In December of 2023, Chase announced he'd been diagnosed with leukemia and has begun treatment.

== Awards ==
- Winner of the King Clancy Memorial Trophy, 1997–98
- Recipient of 2008 Jack Buck Award by the Missouri Athletic Club

== Career statistics ==
			Regular season					Playoffs
Season	Team	League	GP	G	A	Pts	PIM	GP	G	A	Pts	PIM
1985–86	Saskatoon Blades	WHL	57	7	18	25	172	10	3	4	7	37
1986–87	Saskatoon Blades	WHL	68	17	29	46	317	11	2	8	10	37
1987–88	Saskatoon Blades	WHL	70	31	24	55	343	9	3	5	8	32
1988–89	Peoria Rivermen	IHL	38	14	7	21	278	—	—	—	—	—
1989–90	St. Louis Blues	NHL	43	1	3	4	244	9	1	0	1	46
1989–90	Peoria Rivermen	IHL	10	1	2	3	76	—	—	—	—	—
1990–91	St. Louis Blues	NHL	2	1	0	1	15	6	0	0	0	18
1990–91	Peoria Rivermen	IHL	61	20	34	54	406	10	4	3	7	61
1991–92	St. Louis Blues	NHL	46	1	2	3	264	1	0	0	0	7
1992–93	St. Louis Blues	NHL	49	2	5	7	204	—	—	—	—	—
1993–94	St. Louis Blues	NHL	68	2	5	7	278	4	0	1	1	6
1994–95	Hartford Whalers	NHL	28	0	4	4	141	—	—	—	—	—
1995–96	Hartford Whalers	NHL	55	2	4	6	230	—	—	—	—	—
1996–97	Hartford Whalers	NHL	28	1	2	3	122	—	—	—	—	—
1996–97	Toronto Maple Leafs	NHL	2	0	0	0	27	—	—	—	—	—
1997–98	St. Louis Blues	NHL	67	4	3	7	231	7	0	0	0	23
1998–99	St. Louis Blues	NHL	45	3	7	10	143	—	—	—	—	—
1999–2000	St. Louis Blues	NHL	25	0	1	1	118	—	—	—	—	—
NHL totals			458	17	36	53	2,017	27	1	1	2	100

== See also ==
- List of NHL players with 2000 career penalty minutes

Preceded by Trevor Linden	Winner of the King Clancy Memorial Trophy; 1998	Succeeded by Rob Ray
