= John Cairney (disambiguation) =

John Cairney (1957–2023) was a Scottish film and television actor.

John Cairney may also refer to:

- John Cairney (anatomist) (1898–1966), New Zealand anatomist, medical superintendent and writer
- John Cairney (mycologist) (1959–2012), Scottish–Australian mycologist

== See also ==
- John Carney (disambiguation)
