= James C. White =

American journalist

James Charles White Jr. (April 6, 1937 – September 2, 2009) was an American radio talk-show host. He is best known for his 30 years of work at KMOX, in St. Louis, Missouri.

== Youth and early radio career ==
Jim White began his radio career in 1953 (age 16) at radio station WHJB (now WKHB in Irwin, Pennsylvania), at studios then in his hometown Greensburg, Pennsylvania. White was also an amateur radio operator and built his own radio transmitter when he was a teenager. After he graduated from high-school in 1955, White worked at station WDFM at Penn State University. White also served in the U.S. Army. In 1958 White worked at stations WAKU in Latrobe, Pennsylvania and at WMCK in McKeesport, Pennsylvania, both in western Pennsylvania. In 1959 White moved up to work as a rock jock at station WJAS, in downtown Pittsburgh, Pennsylvania. In 1966-1968 White worked at KDKA Radio and Television, in Pittsburgh . anchoring newscasts on the radio, and doing feature stories for Eyewitness News.

White's amateur radio call signs were W3TNY, W0NJB and later KM0X (with a zero to be similar to the alphabetic O in the St. Louis commercial radio station KMOX).

== KMOX in St. Louis ==
During 1969–1999 White worked for 30 years at radio station KMOX, St. Louis, Missouri where he was a talk show host. He referred to himself as "The Big Bumper", because of his height and weight and late-night program shift (10 pm - 2 am) - and also alluding to "things that go bump in the night." Like other people at KMOX, he worked many different jobs and shifts. At one time he was program director, news director, and program host. His irascibile personality was his trademark and he often cut off callers in mid-sentence, if he considered them boring or he disagreed with their opinion.

Because KMOX had 50,000 watts of power and clear channel status, his radio show could be heard at night over much of North America. White retired April 7, 1999.

== Personal life ==
With his wife Pat, White had two daughters, Heidi Horn and Holly Skubiz, and four grandchildren. White had a sister, Ann, who resided in Maui, Hawaii and Phoenix, Arizona.

White sang bass in the church choir and performed singing parts on stage in amateur shows.

After his retirement from KMOX in 1999, Jim White and his wife moved to Orange Beach, Alabama. About May 2005 White had quad bypass surgery on his heart. He lived for another four years, until his death on September 2, 2009, from complications following surgery.

== Awards ==
- A.I.R. Awards for Best Talk Show Host and Lifetime Achievement
- University of Missouri Media Hall of Fame.

== Expressions ==
Some of Jim White's favorite expressions were:

- "You can't fix stupid."
- "Don't trust anyone who doesn't have at least two hobbies."
- "Do two nice things for yourself each day."
- "It's never too late to have a happy childhood."
- "These are the good old days."
- "Protect me from the GOOD people."
- “For every complex problem there is a simple solution that is wrong.”
