= Martin Kilcoyne =

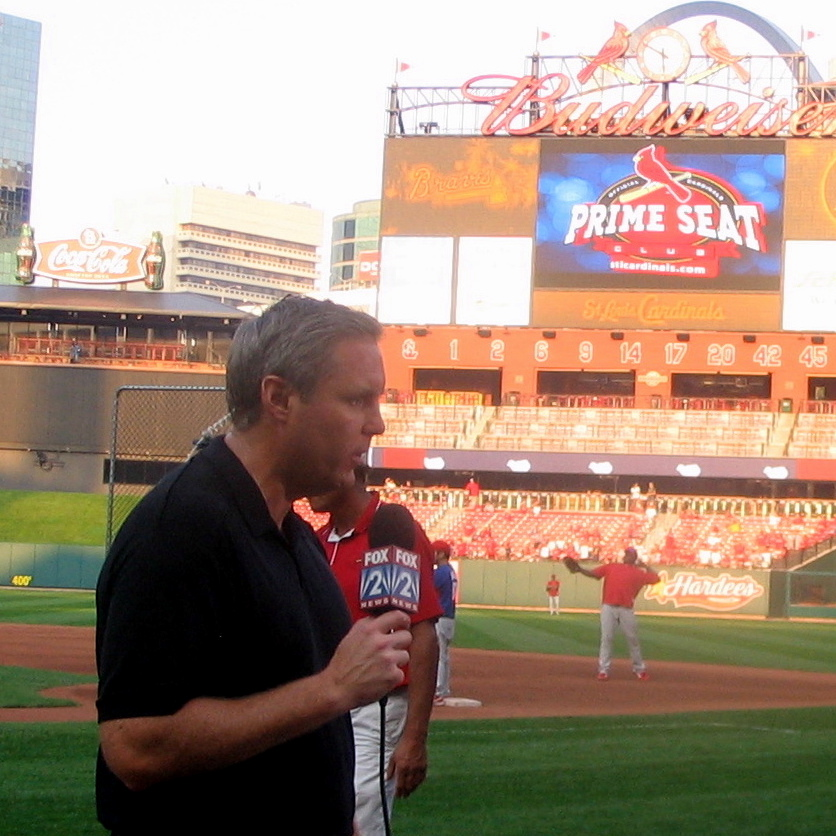
Martin Kilcoyne at Busch Stadium in St. Louis

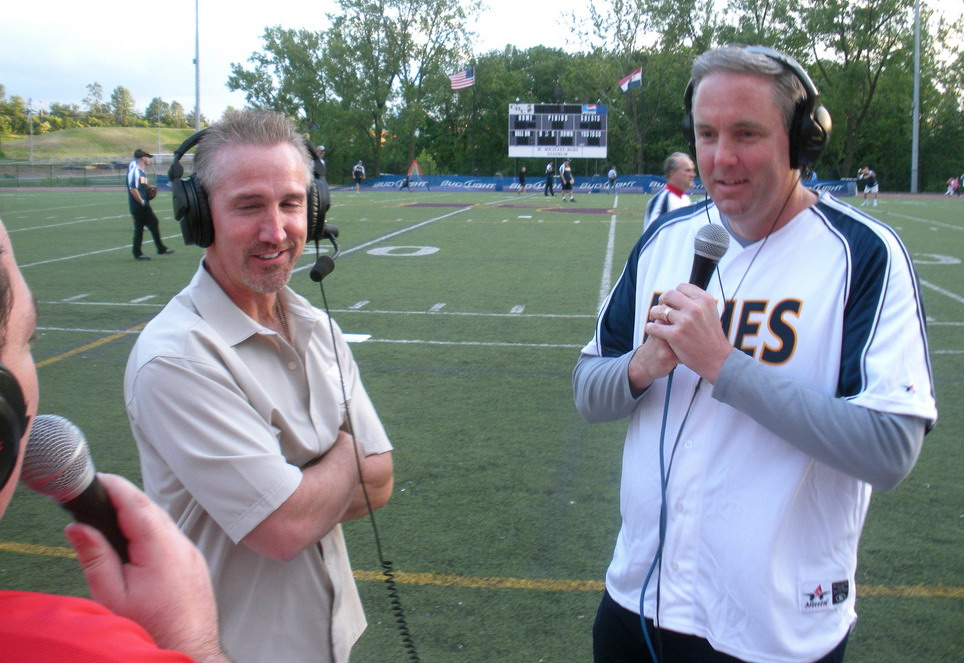
Martin Kilcoyne interviews former St. Louis Rams head coach Steve Spagnulo

Martin J. Kilcoyne (born March 17, 1968) is the sports director at KTVI-TV FOX 2 in St. Louis, Missouri. Kilcoyne anchors the 5, 6 and 9 p.m. sportscasts on Sunday through Thursday nights.

From 2006 to 2010, Kilcoyne was FOX 2's play-by-play announcer for the St. Louis Rams' pre-season football games.

Kilcoyne hosts The Martin Kilcoyne Show, a weekday (12:00 PM–3:00 PM CT) talk show on St. Louis-area radio station KTRS (AM) 550.

St. Louis Magazine featured him on its 2007 "A-List." Kilcoyne was named "Best TV Sports Anchor" in St. Louis by The Riverfront Times. He won the 2008 Emmy for best Sports Anchor from the Mid-America Chapter of the National Academy of Television Arts & Sciences.

In 2025, Kilcoyne returned to the long-running morning drivetime radio show The Morning After on WXOS.

Kilcoyne returned to his hometown of St. Louis when he joined FOX 2 in 1997. Before that, his broadcasting career took him to KNAZ-TV in Flagstaff, Arizona, WJFW-TV in Rhinelander, Wisconsin, and WISC-TV in Madison, Wisconsin. He is a 1990 graduate of Marquette University in Milwaukee, Wisconsin.
