= Mike Shannon =

American baseball player (1939–2023)

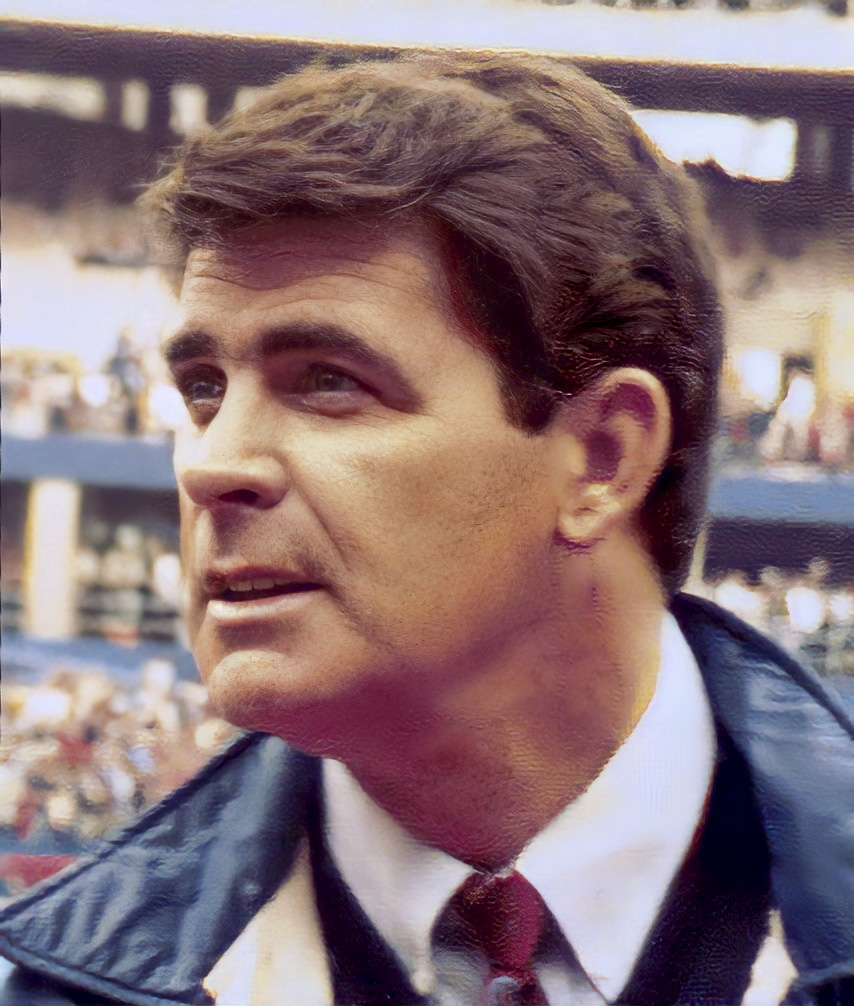
- Shannon in 1983
- Third baseman / Right fielder
- Born: July 15, 1939; St. Louis, Missouri, U.S.
- Died: April 29, 2023 (aged 83); Marion, Illinois, U.S.
- Batted: Right Threw: Right

MLB debut
- September 11, 1962, for the St. Louis Cardinals

Last MLB appearance
- August 12, 1970, for the St. Louis Cardinals

MLB statistics
- Batting average: .255
- Home runs: 68
- Runs batted in: 367
- Stats at Baseball Reference

Teams
- St. Louis Cardinals (1962–1970)

Career highlights and awards
- 2× World Series champion (1964, 1967); St. Louis Cardinals Hall of Fame

Thomas Michael Shannon (July 15, 1939 – April 29, 2023) was an American professional baseball third baseman, right fielder, and radio sports commentator. He played 9 seasons in Major League Baseball (MLB) for the St. Louis Cardinals from 1962 to 1970, before working as their radio broadcaster from 1972 to 2021. Shannon was raised in St. Louis, Missouri, and was an integral part of some of the Cardinals' most successful seasons. He was a part of the 1964 World Series and 1967 World Series champions.

Shannon was the proprietor of Mike Shannon's Steaks and Seafood restaurant in downtown St. Louis until it closed on January 30, 2016. Shannon continued to operate two Mike Shannon's Grill locations, in Edwardsville, Illinois, that closed in 2022, and at St. Louis Lambert International Airport, which is run by his grandson, Justin VanMatre.

== Early life ==
Shannon was born on July 15, 1939, and raised in south St. Louis, the second-oldest of six children of Thomas A. Shannon and Elizabeth W. Richason Shannon. Shannon's father was a St. Louis police officer and after getting his law degree, worked in the prosecuting attorney's office before becoming the Prosecuting Attorney for the City of St. Louis in the early 1970s.

Shannon attended grade school at Epiphany of Our Lord Catholic School and graduated from Christian Brothers College High School in 1957. He was the Missouri High School Player of the Year in both football and basketball his senior year and remains the only athlete to win both awards in the same year.

Shannon attended the University of Missouri and played college baseball for the Missouri Tigers before leaving in 1958 to begin his professional baseball career after signing with Bing Devine, general manager of the St. Louis Cardinals. Shannon, a quarterback, believed himself to be a better football player, and has said that if football players had been paid better during his era, he probably would have stayed at Missouri and sought a professional football career. His former coach Frank Broyles said that had he stayed in school, Shannon might have won the Heisman Trophy.

== Playing career ==
Shannon began his big league career with the St. Louis Cardinals in 1962. In 1964, he became the team's regular right fielder, shifting to third base (in order to make room for the newly acquired Roger Maris) in 1967. Shannon played in three World Series for the Cardinals. He hit a game-tying two-run homer off Whitey Ford in Game 1 of the 1964 World Series against the New York Yankees, which St. Louis won 9–5.

In 1966, Shannon batted .288 in 137 games played with 16 home runs and 64 runs batted in (RBIs). He was named the National League's (NL) Player of the Month in July (.395, seven home runs, 23 RBIs). For 1968, he batted .266 in 156 games, with 15 home runs and 79 RBIs; he finished in seventh place in voting for the NL Most Valuable Player Award, behind teammates Bob Gibson, Curt Flood, and Lou Brock, as well as Giants Willie McCovey and Juan Marichal, and Pete Rose of the Cincinnati Reds.

In Game 3 of the 1967 World Series against the Boston Red Sox, Shannon hit a home run off Gary Bell. In Game 7 of the 1968 World Series against the Detroit Tigers, Shannon's solo home run off Mickey Lolich was the Cardinals' only run off Lolich as the Tigers clinched the series. Shannon also hit the last home run in Sportsman's Park in 1966 and the first one for the Cardinals in Busch Memorial Stadium. In 1970, he contracted nephritis, a kidney disease, which ended his playing career.

== Broadcasting career ==
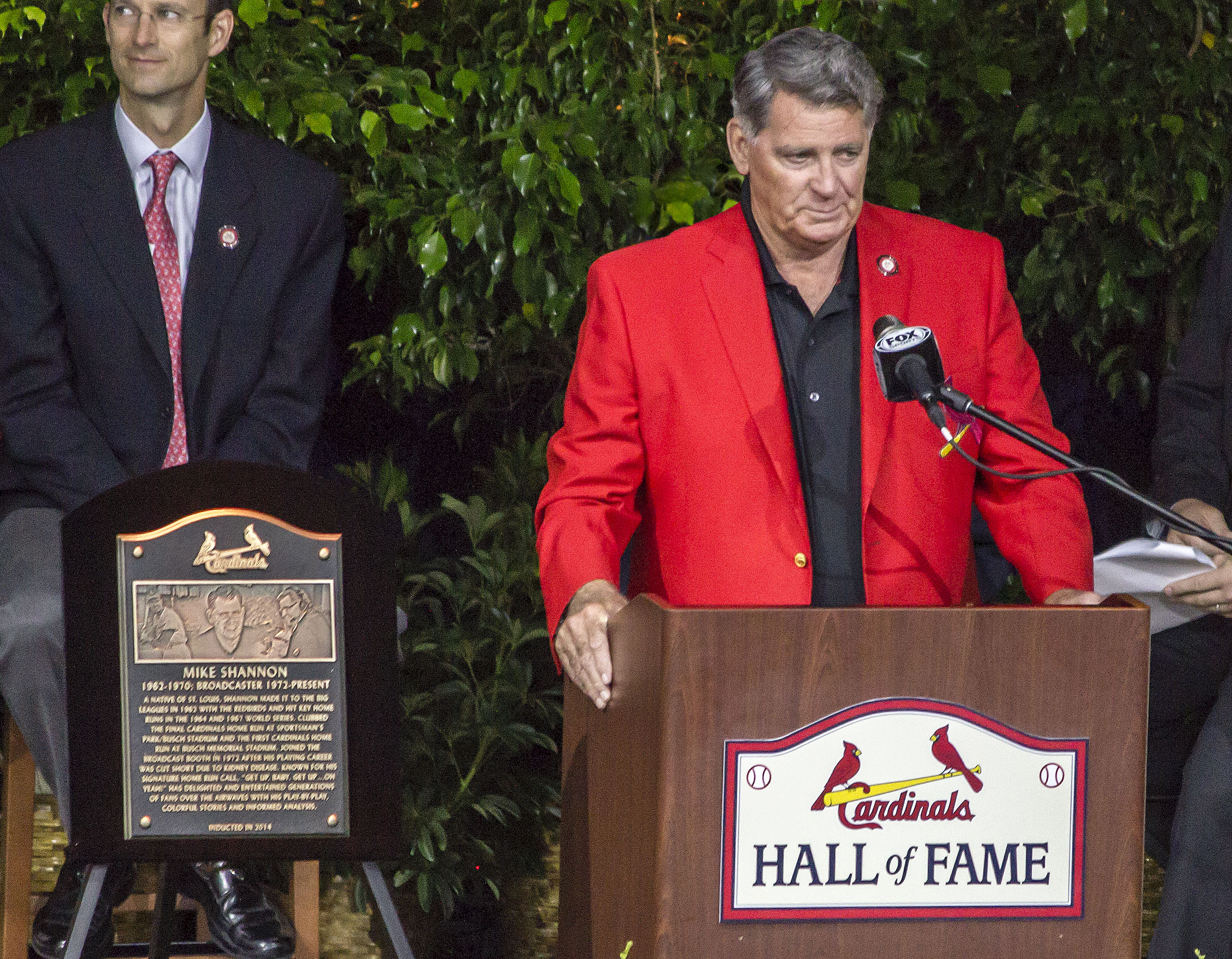
Shannon's Cardinal Hall of Fame induction in 2014

Shannon joined the Cardinals' promotional staff in 1971; a year later he moved to the team's radio booth. For almost three decades Shannon was paired with Hall of Fame announcer Jack Buck on AM 1120 KMOX and the Cardinals Radio Network. After Buck's death in 2002, Shannon became the team's lead radio voice, teaming with Joel Meyers (2002), Wayne Hagin (2003–2005), and John Rooney (2006–2021). In 2006, he moved to KTRS (550) which had won broadcasting rights for the Cardinals and ownership of the station. For the 2011 season, KMOX regained the rights for Cardinals broadcasting and Shannon returned to his former employer.

Shannon received a local Emmy Award for his work on Cardinal broadcasts in 1985, and was inducted into the Missouri Sports Hall of Fame in 1999. He was named Missouri Sportscaster of the Year in 2002 and 2003.

Shannon's signature home run call was "Here's a long one to left/center/right, get up baby, get up, get up...oh yeah!"

During the 1980s, Shannon worked as a backup analyst behind Joe Garagiola and Tony Kubek for NBC's Game of the Week telecasts, typically working with play-by-play man Jay Randolph.

Counting his tenure in the minor leagues, Shannon spent 64 years—nearly his entire adult life—with the Cardinals in some capacity. He also called Cardinals games longer than anyone, 50 years.

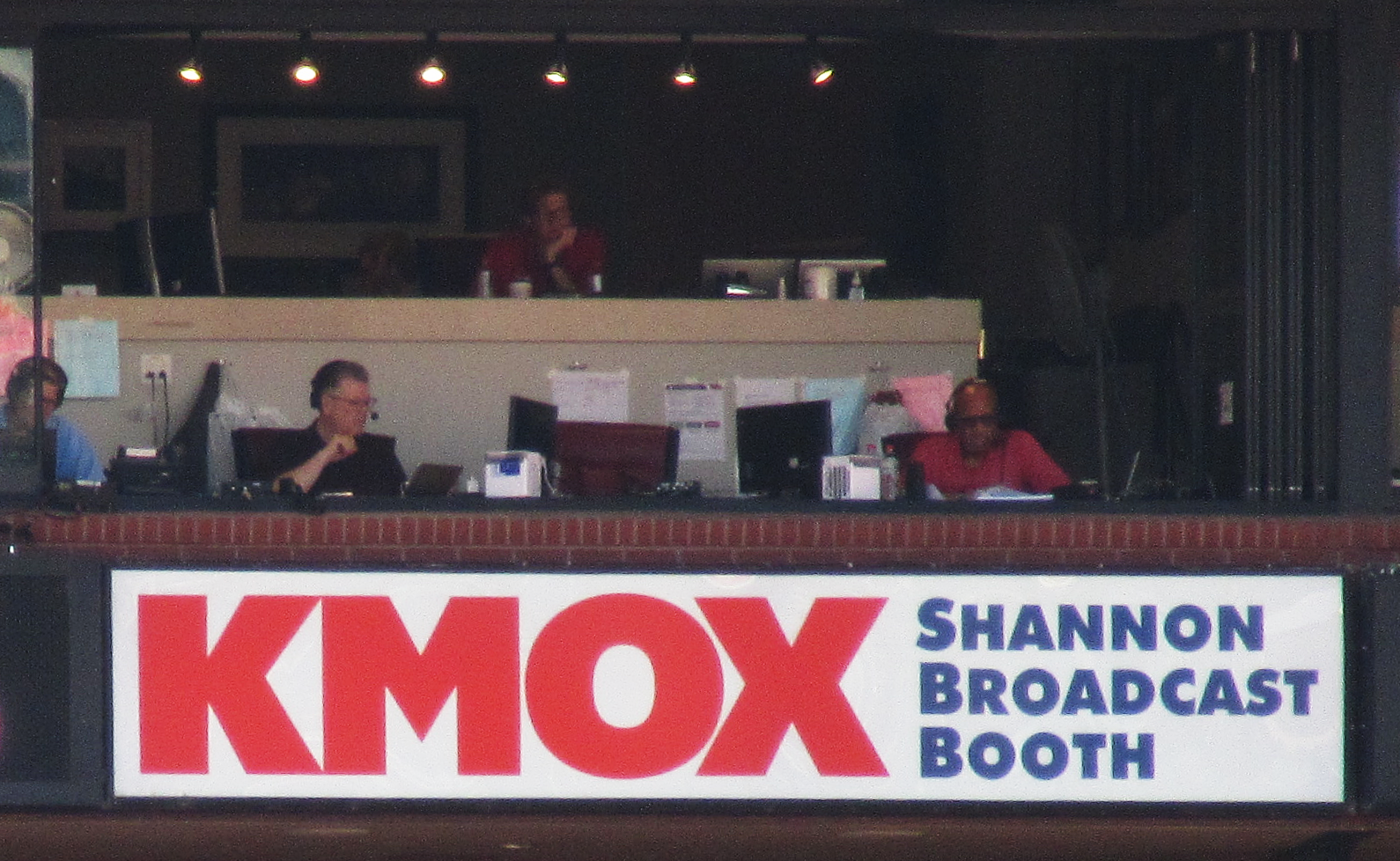
The KMOX radio booth

On August 8, 2014, Shannon was inducted into the St. Louis Cardinals Hall of Fame.

From 2016 until his retirement in 2021, Shannon only called home games for the Cardinals. On January 14, 2021, Shannon announced that the 2021 season, his 50th in the broadcast booth, would be his last. On October 3, 2021, the Cardinals honored Shannon in a farewell ceremony.

== Illness and death ==
Shannon contracted COVID-19 in October 2020, spending 15 days in the hospital, and being placed in a medically induced coma. He recovered but dealt with long COVID in the aftermath.

Shannon died in Marion, Illinois, on April 29, 2023, at the age of 83, after suffering a stroke.

Preceded by Gaylord Perry	Major League Player of the Month; July 1966	Succeeded by Pete Rose
