= J. Buck's =

J. Buck's Restaurant
- Company type: Private company
- Industry: Restaurants
- Founded: 1999
- Defunct: 2015
- Headquarters: St. Louis, Missouri
- Number of locations: 2
- Key people: Joe Buck, Julie Buck
- Website: www.jbucks.com

J. Buck's was a restaurant chain named after the Buck family of broadcasters, Jack Buck, Joe Buck, and Julie Buck. Established in 1999, J. Buck's operated two restaurants in Greater St. Louis, Missouri. The franchise closed on October 31, 2015.

== History ==
The restaurant chain was originally opened and operated by Ted Geiger of WAG Restaurants. The Buck family did not have ownership in the company, but received royalties for the use of their likenesses. The chain expanded to seven locations. However, in October 2008, five of the locations closed, and the chain was taken over by Bodley Buck LLC, an investment company which included siblings Joe and Julie Buck, the children of Jack Buck. After more than 15 years, the franchise closed its final locations on October 31, 2015.

== Locations ==
J. Buck's had three locations in Missouri; one is St. Louis, one in Springfield and another in Clayton. The Springfield location closed in 2010 and the two other locations both closed on October 31, 2015.

== Menu ==
J. Buck's introduced a new, expanded menu in January 2009 featuring salads, sandwiches, pizzas and entrees along with desserts and daily specials.

== See also ==
- Cuisine of St. Louis
