= KMOX =

Radio station in St. Louis, Missouri

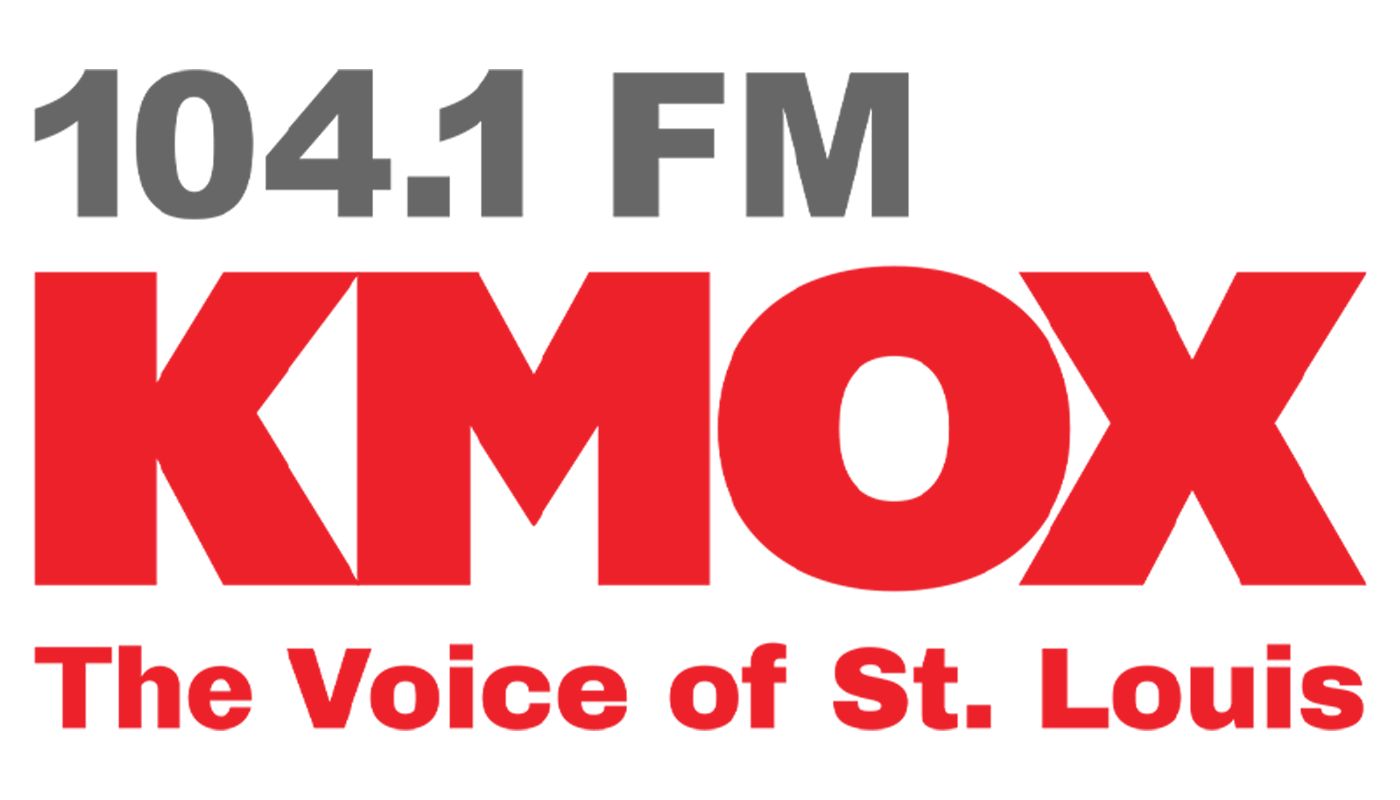
- St. Louis, Missouri; United States
- Broadcast area: Greater St. Louis
- Frequency: 1120 kHz
- Branding: 104.1 FM KMOX

Programming
- Language: English
- Format: Talk radio
- Affiliations: KMOV; Premiere Networks; Westwood One; St. Louis Cardinals Radio Network

Ownership
- Owner: Audacy, Inc. (Sale to Hoffman Media Group pending); (Audacy License, LLC)
- Sister stations: KEZK-FM; KFTK-FM; KMOX-FM; KYKY; WFUN-FM

History
- First air date: December 24, 1925
- Former call signs: KMOX (1925–1928); KMOX-KFQA (1928–1930)
- Call sign meaning: Missouri Xmas Eve (station first signed on the air on Christmas Eve)

Technical information
- Licensing authority: FCC
- Facility ID: 9638
- Class: A
- Power: 50,000 watts
- Transmitter coordinates: 38°43′21.18″N 90°3′18.38″W (main); 38°43′24″N 90°3′12″W (aux)
- Repeater: 104.1 KMOX-FM (Hazelwood)

Links
- Public license information: Public file; LMS
- Webcast: Listen live (via Audacy); Listen live (via iHeartRadio)
- Website: www.audacy.com/kmox

KMOX (1120 AM) is a commercial radio station in St. Louis, Missouri, owned by Audacy, Inc. and featuring a talk format. The station is a 50,000 watt Class A clear-channel station with a non-directional signal. The KMOX studios and offices are on Olive Street at Tucker Boulevard in the Park Pacific Building in St. Louis. KMOX refers to itself as "The Voice of St. Louis".

KMOX's transmitter is located off Route 162 in Pontoon Beach, Illinois. KMOX's nighttime signal can be heard across most of the United States and into Mexico and Canada. However, it is strongest in the Central United States. Its daytime signal provides at least secondary coverage to most of Eastern Missouri and much of Southern Illinois. The station is also heard on KMOX-FM 104.1, and promotes itself solely as "104.1 FM KMOX". Along with WIL-FM, KMOX is responsible for the activation of the Greater St. Louis Emergency Alert System (EAS) for hazardous weather, disaster declarations, etc., and is the EAS primary entry point for eastern Missouri and southern Illinois.

== History ==
=== Early years ===
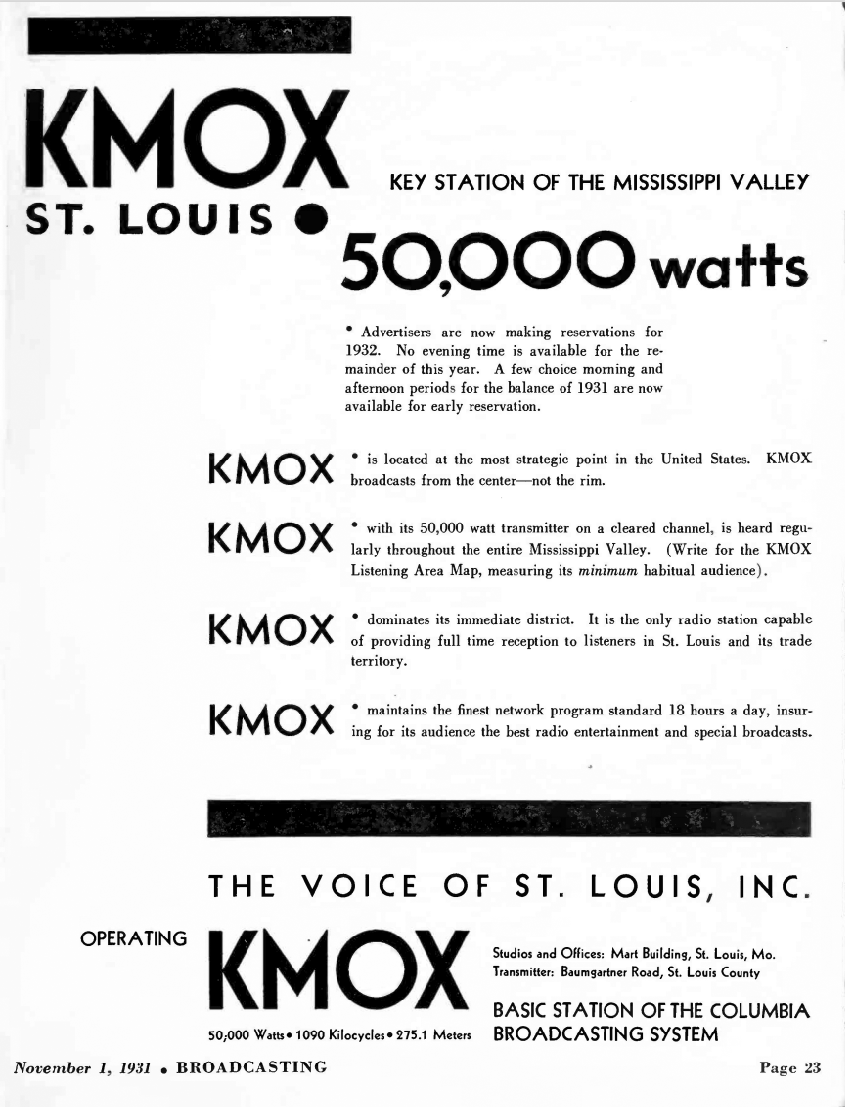
November 1931 station advertisement.

KMOX was started in the early 1920s by a group of businessmen who formed a company known as "The Voice of St. Louis, Inc." The station's owners wanted the call sign KVSL, for "Voice of St. Louis". The owners also applied for KMO, with MO the abbreviation for Missouri, but those call letters had been in use since 1922 by another radio station in Tacoma, Washington. KMOX signed on the air on December 24, 1925. The "X" was added because the starting date was Christmas Eve, thus shortened with the common abbreviation of Christmas to represent Xmas Eve.

In 1927, the station gave prominent coverage to the Charles Lindbergh flight across the Atlantic in his plane the Spirit of St. Louis. That same year, KMOX became one of the first 16 affiliates of the CBS Radio Network. (Note: The other stations were WOR in Newark; WADC in Akron, Ohio; WAIU in Columbus, Ohio; WCAO in Baltimore; WCAU in Philadelphia; WEAN in Providence; WFBL in Syracuse; WGHP in Detroit; WJAS in Pittsburgh; WKRC in Cincinnati; WMAK in Buffalo-Lockport; WMAQ in Chicago; WNAC in Boston; WOWO in Fort Wayne, Indiana; and KOIL in Council Bluffs, Iowa.)

Following the establishment of the Federal Radio Commission (FRC), stations were initially issued a series of temporary authorizations starting on May 3, 1927. In addition, stations were informed that if they wanted to continue operating, they needed to file a formal license application by January 15, 1928, as the first step in determining whether they met the new "public interest, convenience, or necessity" standard. On May 25, 1928, the FRC issued General Order 32, which notified 164 stations, including KFQA, also in St. Louis, that "From an examination of your application for future license it does not find that public interest, convenience, or necessity would be served by granting it." KFQA proposed that instead of maintaining its own transmitting facility, it would share the facilities of an existing station. The FRC initially disapproved of this proposal, and ordered KFQA deleted, but eventually relented, and assigned KMOX to be operated under the dual call sign of KMOX-KFQA.

On November 11, 1928, the FRC made a major reallocation of station transmitting frequencies, as part of a reorganization resulting from its implementation of General Order 40. KMOX was designated a clear-channel station on 1090 kHz. In mid-1930, the dual call sign operation as KMOX-KFQA ended, and the station's call sign reverted to just KMOX.

=== CBS ownership ===
CBS bought KMOX and began the process of getting approval to build a 50,000-watt transmitter tower. When completed, KMOX had a signal that could be heard at night through much of the Central United States. In the early days of radio, KMOX broadcasts had been picked up in Scotland, New Zealand, the Arctic Circle and South Africa.

In 1933, KMOX covered the first post-Prohibition shipment of Budweiser beer leaving the Anheuser-Busch St. Louis brewery for the White House, a story carried nationally by CBS. Through the "Golden Age of Radio", KMOX carried the CBS schedule of dramas, comedies, news, sports, soap operas, game shows and big band broadcasts. The studios and offices were housed in the Merchandise Mart Building on Washington Street.

On March 29, 1941, KMOX moved from 1090 to 1120 kHz, as part of the implementation of the North American Regional Broadcasting Agreement (NARBA). The agreement required most stations to move their frequencies.

=== TV and FM stations ===
CBS had planned to have a corporate-owned and operated television station in St. Louis, to pair with KMOX. In 1957, the network originally won a construction permit from the Federal Communications Commission (FCC) to build a new station on Channel 11, the last remaining commercial VHF channel in St. Louis. After being approached with an offer, CBS decided in August of that year to instead buy the existing KWK-TV for $4 million. KWK-TV was owned by a group including the publisher of the St. Louis Globe-Democrat.

CBS took control of KWK-TV's operations that March, and changed its call letters to KMOX-TV, sharing the call sign with AM 1120. The original Viacom purchased KMOX-TV from CBS in 1986. Because of an FCC regulation in place then that prohibited TV and radio stations in the same market, but with different ownership, from sharing the same call sign, Channel 4 changed to KMOV.

KMOX added an FM station on February 12, 1962. It broadcast at 103.3 MHz and mostly simulcast the AM station. By the late 1960s, KMOX-FM was separately programmed, airing an easy listening format, then later shifted to Top 40 as KHTR in 1982, and eventually becoming oldies station KLOU. KLOU would be sold twice by CBS: in 1997 to Entercom as part of a swap involving two San Francisco radio stations, and in 1998 to Jacor as a condition of CBS's merger with American Radio Systems (which had acquired KLOU in the interim).

In July 1968, CBS opened a new studio and office facility in downtown St. Louis to house KMOX-AM-FM-TV, which until that point had been operating from separate locations. The radio stations had been headquartered near Forest Park. KMOX-TV moved from Cole Street into the new facility, known as One Memorial Drive.

=== Talk radio pioneer ===
As network programming shifted from radio to television in the 1950s, KMOX switched to a full service format of talk shows, news, and middle of the road (later adult contemporary) music. In 1955, Robert Hyland Jr. became KMOX's general manager, a role he held for nearly 40 years. It was Hyland who leveraged KMOX's relationship with the St. Louis Cardinals, signing many lucrative advertising contracts with local businesses.

Hyland made the decision in 1960 to eliminate the station's afternoon music programming, the last of the non-talk shows. That made KMOX the first full-time talk radio station in the country, helping keep KMOX dominance in the St. Louis radio market for many decades. On February 29, 1960, Jack Buck hosted the first "At Your Service" program, which included an interview with former First Lady Eleanor Roosevelt. That program, like the sports and talk shows that soon followed, pioneered a format for radio featuring news maker interviews, guest appearances, and calls from listeners.

KMOX held the distinction of holding the record for consecutive number one Arbitron ratings books in the United States. The station was consistently the top rated radio station in St. Louis since the ratings service began in 1972 until 2010, when WARH took over the top spot in the Arbs. KMOX remains the top rated AM station, consistently in the top ten in the Nielsen ratings for St. Louis.

After Hyland died in 1992, Rod Zimmerman was named general manager. He departed in 1998 to manage CBS station WBBM Radio in Chicago.

KMOX picked up Costas Coast to Coast in 1994. Also, in July of that year, Bob Costas began hosting a sports call-in show on the station.

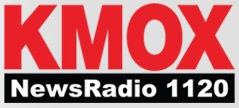
Logo as "NewsRadio 1120", before translator launch

Karen Carroll was general manager from 1998 until 2003, when Tom Langmyer was promoted to the top position. Langmyer left in 2005 to become vice president/general manager of WGN Radio in Chicago. Dave Ervin managed the station from 2005 to 2008. Becky Domyan later became the Vice President and Market Manager for KMOX and sister stations KEZK and KYKY.

KMOX started broadcasting in HD Radio in May 2006. In 1988, KMOX broadcast using C-QUAM's AM stereo technology, but stereo transmissions ended in the spring of 2000.

On January 5, 2009, KMOX became the home base for Jon Grayson's Overnight America, which CBS Radio internally syndicated to WBZ in Boston, WCCO in Minneapolis, and KDKA in Pittsburgh. On January 30, 2012, Overnight America began to be syndicated by Dial Global, expanding its distribution beyond KMOX, WCCO, and KDKA. (Note: The program had been canceled by WBZ in late January 2009, after listener protests led to the restoration of its previous local overnight program.) The syndication was discontinued by Westwood One at the end of 2016, but Grayson continued to air locally on KMOX until February 13, 2007.

=== Entercom/Audacy ownership ===
On February 2, 2017, CBS Radio announced it would merge with Entercom. The merger was approved on November 9, 2017, and was consummated on November 17. The Entercom acquisition ended KMOX's 88 years of CBS ownership.

KMOX carried The Rush Limbaugh Show weekdays for several decades. The program was sometimes pre-empted by St. Louis Cardinals' afternoon baseball games. Limbaugh was one of the few non-local shows broadcast on the station. KMOX also began carrying two non-local shows overnight, Our American Stories with Lee Habeeb and America in the Morning.

For the past 21 years, KMOX has hosted a holiday radio program every year. KMOX personalities perform an old-time radio show in front of a live audience. Some years, the script is from A Christmas Carol.

Logo while simulcasting on 98.7

On March 22, 2021, KMOX added an FM translator on 98.7 MHz, K254CR. It was formerly used for KFTK (AM), then temporarily for KFTK-FM. This translator provides coverage to the city of St. Louis and adjacent communities. KMOX added The Dave Glover Show to the schedule, which aired on KFTK for the previous two years. Following Rush Limbaugh's death, the station launched a new, local show hosted by longtime news reporter Carol Daniel in its midday timeslot.

On March 6, 2025, RadioInsight.com reported that KMOX's programming would begin to simulcast on sister station WHHL (104.1 FM) in the week before opening day of the 2025 Cardinals season. This change was officially announced on March 10; the simulcast on 104.1, renamed KMOX-FM, launched on March 24, with an automated version of WHHL's former format replacing KMOX on 98.7.

On June 29, 2026, Audacy announced the sale of its St. Louis stations, including the KMOX stations, to Hoffman Media Group.

=== Sports ===
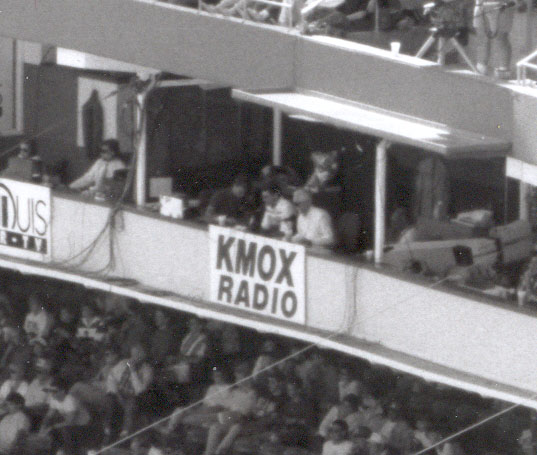
Jack Buck and Mike Shannon announcing a St. Louis Cardinals game at Busch Memorial Stadium, 1992

KMOX has had a long history of broadcasting sports. In 1926, it aired the Cardinals-Yankees World Series, and starting the next season the station began airing St. Louis Cardinals' games.

During the 1930s and 1940s, KMOX was one of several St. Louis stations broadcasting both the Cardinals and St. Louis Browns baseball games. KMOX lost broadcasting rights in 1948 when a new Cardinals radio network was formed by the team, but by the 1950s, it became the flagship station of that network (in part due to its clear channel status).

KMOX's most famous sports broadcaster was Jack Buck, who was the station's year-round sports director during the years he was also calling baseball and football for the CBS radio and television networks. Another famous announcer was Harry Caray, who did play-by-play for Cardinals' baseball from 1945 through 1969. Dan Kelly was hired in 1968 to broadcast the new Blues hockey team and became the voice of hockey in the city until his death in 1989: his son John is the team's TV commentator today. Bill Wilkerson, the station's football caller, was the first black man to be the lead announcer for an NFL team when he took over commentary duties for the football Cardinals in 1973: three years later, he would assume the same position for Mizzou football, where once again he would be one of the first black primary broadcasters in major college athletics, only leaving the post in 1993 when he was poached by KTRS. Bob Costas did play-by-play on KMOX for the Spirits of St. Louis of the American Basketball Association from 1974 until the ABA-NBA merger in June 1976.

At times, the station's emphasis had shifted away from broadcasting St. Louis professional sports teams. In 2000, the St. Louis Blues hockey team moved to KTRS after having been on KMOX for all but three of the team's 33 seasons (1967–2000), but the games returned starting in the 2006–07 season. The St. Louis Blues moved to WXOS starting in the 2019–2020 season. In 2006, the Cardinals' broadcasts moved to KTRS after 52 seasons on KMOX (1954–2005) after the team purchased controlling interest in KTRS. On September 1, 2010, the Cardinals announced the return of broadcasts to KMOX, starting in the 2011 baseball season.

KMOX aired University of Missouri Tigers football and basketball games for many years, and was the flagship of their radio network until the 1990s. In 2011, the Tigers moved to KTRS.

The station continues to host sports programming such as "Sports Open Line". Matt Pauley is the main host.

== Programming ==
KMOX airs a talk radio format with blocks of news every morning and in weekday afternoon drive time. Two local talk shows are heard during the day: Chris & Amy (Chris Rongey and Amy Marxkors) in late mornings and The Dave Glover Show in early afternoons. In the evening, the station airs a local sports show, Sports Open Line with Matt Pauley, along with repeats of The Dave Glover Show. Three nationally syndicated shows run overnight, Our American Stories with Lee Habeeb, The Other Side of Midnight with Lionel and America in the Morning with John Trout.

KMOX is the flagship station of the St. Louis Cardinals baseball team and the Saint Louis Billikens men's basketball team.

== Live play-by-play sports on KMOX ==
- St. Louis Blues hockey (1967–1985, 1988–2000, 2006–2019, spillover games on co-owned KYKY)
- St. Louis Cardinals baseball (1928–1948, 1954–2005, 2011–present)
- St. Louis Cardinals football (1960–1987)
- St. Louis Hawks basketball (1955–1968)

== Notable personalities ==
Notable current and past KMOX broadcasters include:

- Buddy Blattner
- Jack Buck (1954–1958, 1961–2001)
- Joe Buck
- Harry Caray (1945–1969)
- Jack Carney (1971–1983)
- John Carney
- Kelly Chase
- Bob Costas (1974–1981)
- Rex Davis (1948–1981)
- Dizzy Dean (1941–1948)
- Dan Dierdorf (1984–1986)
- Art Fleming (1980–1992)
- Joe Garagiola
- Charles Jaco
- Dan Kelly (1967–1988)
- Dan P. Kelly
- Gus Kyle
- France Laux, The Sporting News first recipient
- Bernie Miklasz
- John Rooney (2006–present)
- Mike Shannon (1972–2021)
- Bob Starr (1972–1979)
- Jim White (1969–1999)
- Bill Wilkerson (1969–1996)
- Bob Hardy (1960–1993)
