= Bill Wilkerson =

American radio personality and sports announcer

- Born: 1945; St. Louis, Missouri, U.S.
- Died: November 2, 2017 (aged 72); Florissant, Missouri, U.S.
- Education: B.A. (Journalism)
- Alma mater: SIU
- Occupation: Radio personality
- Years active: 1969–2006
- Spouse: Margie (m. 1977; died 2017)
- Children: 3

Bill Wilkerson (1945 – November 2, 2017) was an American radio personality and sports announcer who enjoyed a long career on St. Louis stations KMOX (1969–1996) and KTRS (1996–2006).

== Early life ==
Wilkerson was born and raised in St. Louis, Missouri. He majored in journalism and received his B.A. at Southern Illinois University in Carbondale, Illinois, where he played football.

== Radio career ==
In 1969, Wilkerson got his first job on KMOX in St. Louis. He partnered with Bob Costas for the first year of St. Louis Spirits (ABA), 1975–76. He served as a radio play-by-play announcer for St. Louis Cardinals ("Big Red") football from 1973 until the team left for Phoenix following the 1987 season, and returned for one season in 1994, the franchise's first as the Arizona Cardinals. He became the first black to be the main play-by-play man for an NFL team, and the first color announcer when he teamed up with Dan Kelly to do St. Louis Blues (NHL) games. He also broadcast Missouri Tigers football from 1976 until 1993. While handling football games, he also co-hosted KMOX's "Total Information AM" (The Morning Show) with Bob Hardy and Wendy Wiese for many years. He and Wiese changed stations in St. Louis for rival KTRS in 1996. He retired from radio in 2006.

== Personal life ==
He started MPS Worldwide, a bulk chemical company after he retired from KTRS. He was a longtime board member of Mathews-Dickey Boys' & Girls' Club in St. Louis, and served on the boards of the American Red Cross, St. Louis Children's Hospital, and the St. Louis Zoological Society. He is a member of the Mizzou Media Hall of Fame.

== Death ==
Wilkerson died on November 2, 2017, at his home in Florissant, Missouri after a brief illness.
