= John Carney Agricultural Complex =

- U.S. National Register of Historic Places
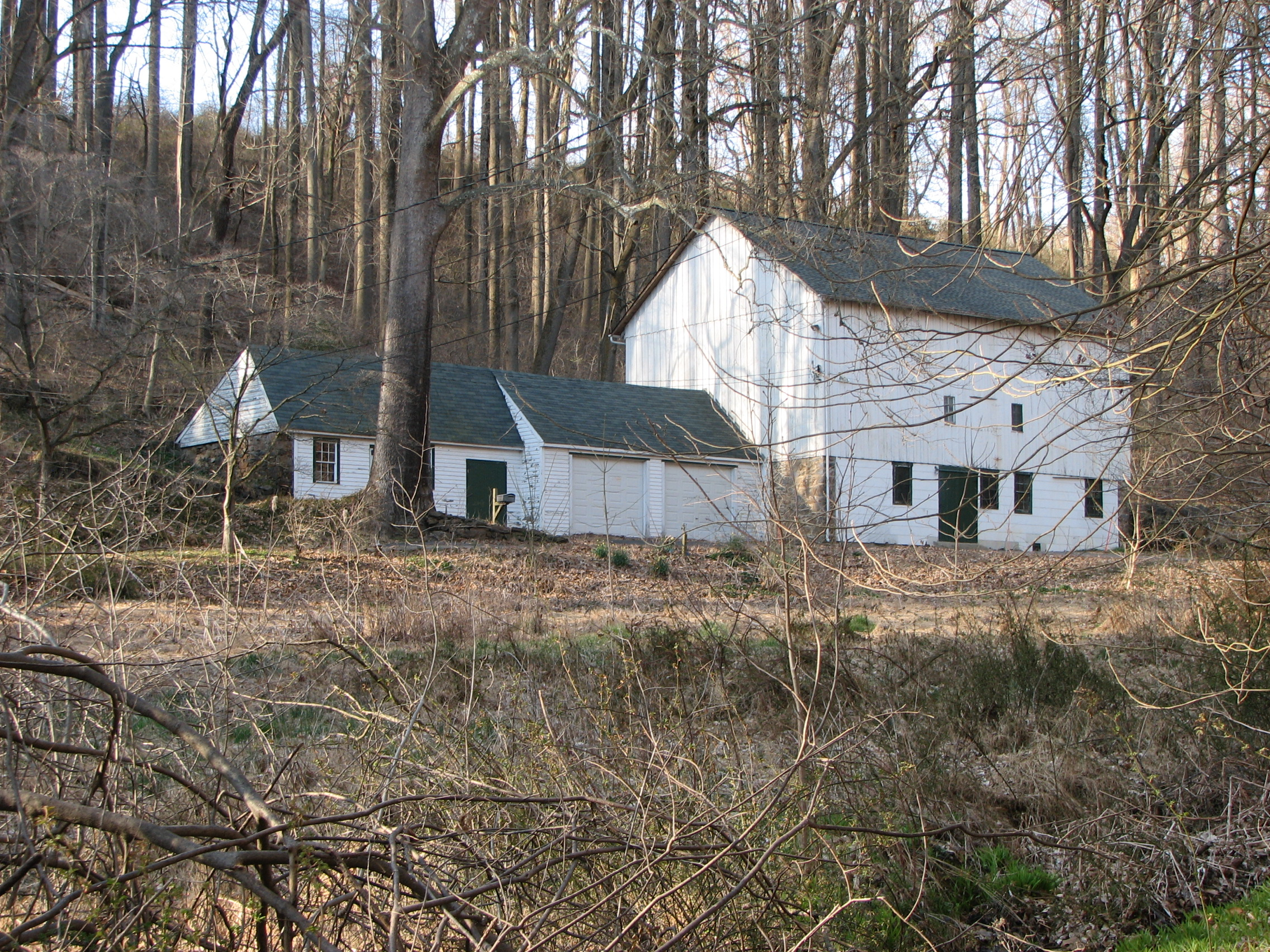
- Barn at the site

- Location within Delaware Location within the United States
- Location: 4300 Thompson Bridge Road, Greenville, Delaware
- Coordinates: 39.820386°N 75.566779°W
- Area: 11 acres (4.5 ha)
- Architectural style: Colonial Revival
- NRHP reference No.: 09000050
- Added to NRHP: February 25, 2009

John Carney Agricultural Complex is a historic farm complex located at Greenville, New Castle County, Delaware. The complex includes three contributing buildings and four contributing structures. Since 1997, it has been part of Brandywine Creek State Park, although it is not open to the public.

It was added to the National Register of Historic Places in 2009.
