= John Carney House =

Historic house in Illinois, United States

- U.S. National Register of Historic Places
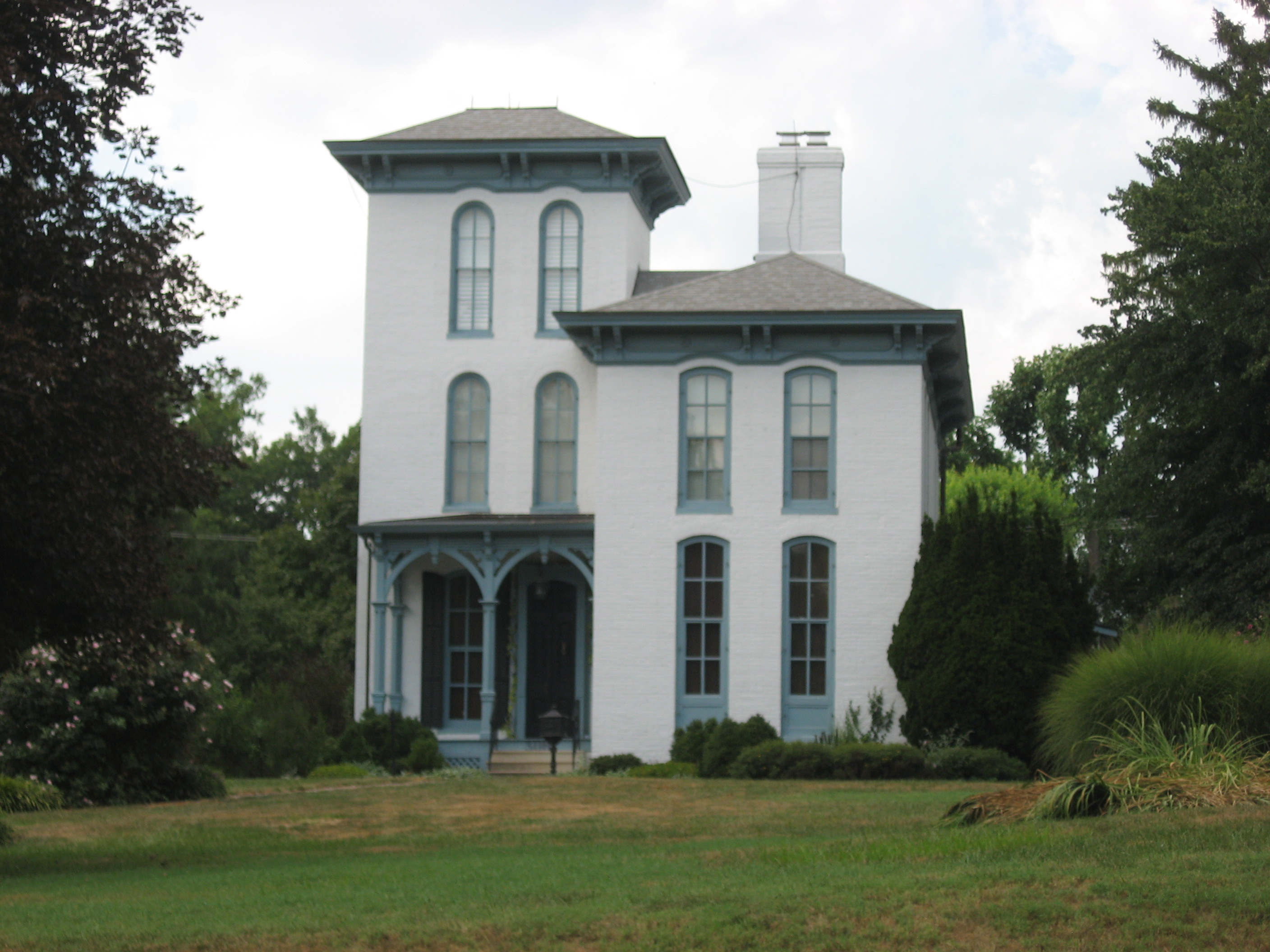

- Location within Illinois Location within the United States
- Location: 306 E. Market St., Troy, Illinois
- Coordinates: 38°43′45″N 89°52′40″W
- Area: 1.1 acres (0.45 ha)
- Built: 1871
- Architectural style: Italianate
- NRHP reference No.: 83000327
- Added to NRHP: July 28, 1983

The John Carney House is a historic house located at 306 E. Market St. in Troy, Illinois. The house was built in 1871 for John Carney, a local businessman, and his wife Elizabeth, who came from the locally prominent Koerner family. The Italianate house is one of the few designed in the style in Troy. The two-story house features a recessed three-story tower at the entrance. The porches at the front and rear entrances have Victorian designs with post arches and brackets. The house's design includes tall round-headed windows and scrolled brackets along the cornice.

The house was added to the National Register of Historic Places on July 28, 1983.
