= John Rooney (sportscaster) =

American sportscaster (born 1955)

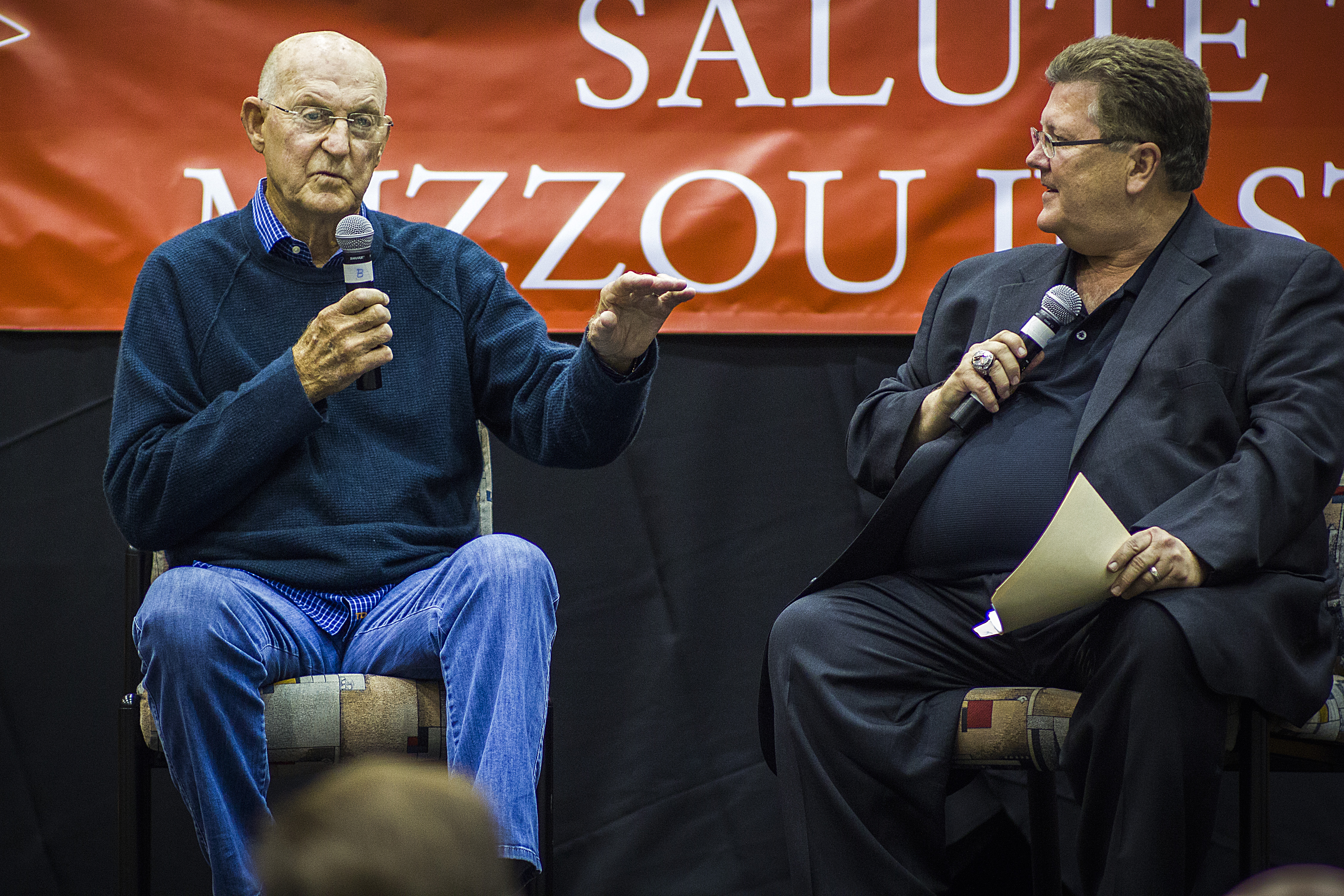
- Rooney (right) interviewing Mizzou basketball coach Norm Stewart in 2014
- Born: January 30, 1955 (age 71); Richmond, Missouri, U.S.
- Sports commentary career
- Teams: Chicago White Sox (1988–2005); St. Louis Cardinals (2006–present)
- Genre: Play-by-play
- Sport: Major League Baseball

John Rooney (born January 30, 1955) is an American sports commentator. Since 2006, he has been a radio play-by-play announcer for the St. Louis Cardinals of Major League Baseball (MLB).

== Early career ==
A native of Richmond, Missouri, Rooney began his broadcast career in the 1970s with assignments for various radio stations in Missouri and Oklahoma. In 1980, he began calling play-by-play for the Oklahoma City 89ers, a minor-league baseball team. He broadcast for the Louisville Redbirds beginning in 1983. He also called Missouri Tigers men's basketball for many years and did Chicago Bulls radio from 1989 to 1991.

== Major League Baseball career ==
Rooney broadcast for the Minnesota Twins in the mid-1980s. In 1988, he joined the Chicago White Sox television crew; the following year, he switched to the team's radio booth, where he teamed up with Wayne Hagin (1989–1991) and Ed Farmer (1992–2005).

In September 2005, it was announced Rooney would be leaving the White Sox' radio crew after 18 years due to a salary dispute with their new flagship station. His final broadcast with the team was Game 4 of the 2005 World Series, which produced the White Sox's first championship since 1917. The next season, he joined the Cardinals' radio crew on KTRS, teaming with former player and veteran broadcaster Mike Shannon. The Cardinals won the 2006 World Series, so Rooney called successive championship seasons for different teams—a major league first.

== National work ==
Rooney worked for CBS Radio from 1984 to 2003, nationally broadcasting various sports events, including Major League Baseball, the National Football League, college football, and college basketball. He called Saturday baseball telecasts for Fox Sports from 1996 to 1998, and postseason Division Series games for ESPN Radio in 2003 and 2004, as well as NFL games on the Sports USA Radio Network. Rooney has worked 20 MLB All Star Games on National Radio and called 19 NCAA Tournaments on the National Radio Network, including 10 National Championship Games. Over the years Rooney has been an announcer on various college basketball telecasts including the Big 10, Conference USA, Big East and has been the Voice of the Missouri Valley Conference telecasts. He has broadcast College Football Bowl Games including the Cotton, Orange, Fiesta, Sun, Independence and Capital One Bowls. In 2004, he was inducted into the Missouri Sports Hall of Fame.

== Catchphrases ==
Rooney punctuates team victories with a catchphrase: "That's a Redbirds/White Sox winner!" His signature home run call is "It's a goner!". When the leadoff batter is due up first in later innings, he says "Top of the order to you".
