= KTRS (AM) =

News/talk radio station in St. Louis

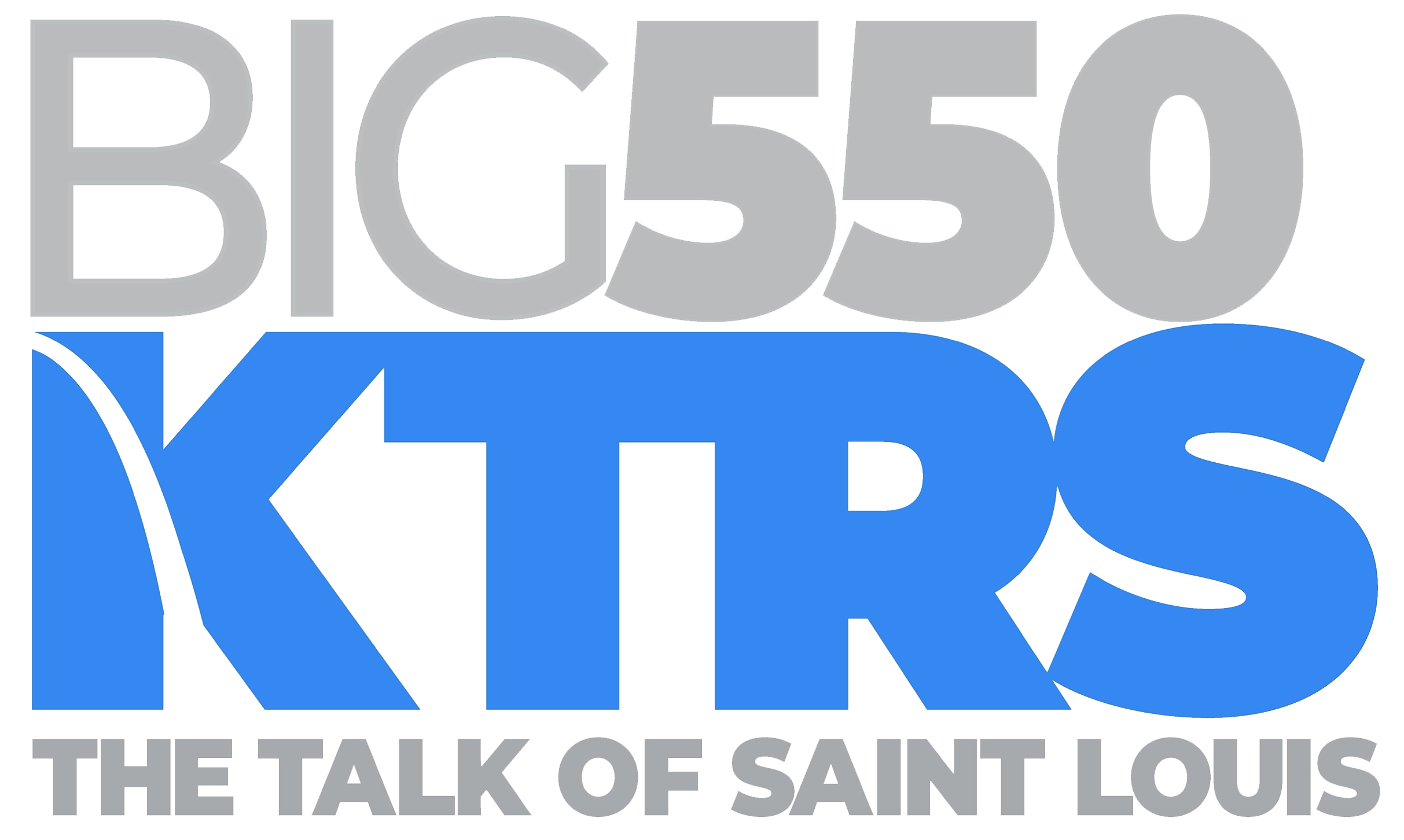
- St. Louis, Missouri; United States
- Broadcast area: Greater St. Louis
- Frequency: 550 kHz
- Branding: The Big Five-Fifty, KTRS

Programming
- Format: Talk
- Network: ABC News Radio
- Affiliations: Westwood One; Missouri Tigers

Ownership
- Owner: KTRS-AM License, L.L.C.; (KTRS-AM, L.L.C.)

History
- First air date: June 26, 1922
- Former call signs: KSD (1922–1983); KUSA (1983–1993); KSD (1993–1997)
- Call sign meaning: "Talk Radio St. Louis"

Technical information
- Licensing authority: FCC
- Facility ID: 20359
- Class: B
- Power: 5,000 watts
- Transmitter coordinates: 38°39′45″N 90°7′43″W
- Translator: 106.1 K291CW (St. Louis)

Links
- Public license information: Public file; LMS
- Webcast: ktrs.com/stream
- Website: ktrs.com

KTRS (550 kHz) is a commercial AM radio station in St. Louis, Missouri. The station airs a talk radio format with some sports. The station is owned by KTRS-AM License, L.L.C., a consortium of local investors which includes actor and St. Louis native John Goodman. KTRS's studios and offices are located in Westport Plaza in Maryland Heights.

KTRS broadcasts with 5,000 watts of power, day and night. It uses a directional antenna at night to avoid interfering with other stations on AM 550. The transmitter is located near Gateway Motorsports Park in Madison, Illinois. KTRS can also be heard in St. Louis and its adjacent suburbs on 250-watt FM translator K291CW at 106.1 MHz.

== Programming ==
=== Talk shows ===
On weekdays, KTRS airs local shows during the day and evenings. Zack Beining has an agricultural show with "Farmer Dave" Schumacher, followed by McGraw Milhaven in morning drive time, Frank Cusumano and Jill Farmer in late mornings, John Carney and Julie Buck in early afternoons, Heidi Glaus with and Josh Gilbert and Bob Ramsey in afternoon drive time, The Big Sports Show with Brendan Weise in the early evening. Two syndicated shows are heard: America at Night with Rich Valdés overnight and America in the Morning airs before sunrise.

Weekend programming includes shows on money, health, the outdoors, technology, home improvement, movies and pets, with occasional sports events. Most hours begin with world and national news from ABC News Radio.

=== Sports ===
- University of Missouri Tigers football and men's basketball, Tiger Talk, and Tiger Update.
- Missouri Turkey Day Game (Thanksgiving) and Show-Me Bowl state championships (in years when the game is held in the St. Louis area) in high school football

== History ==
=== Early years ===
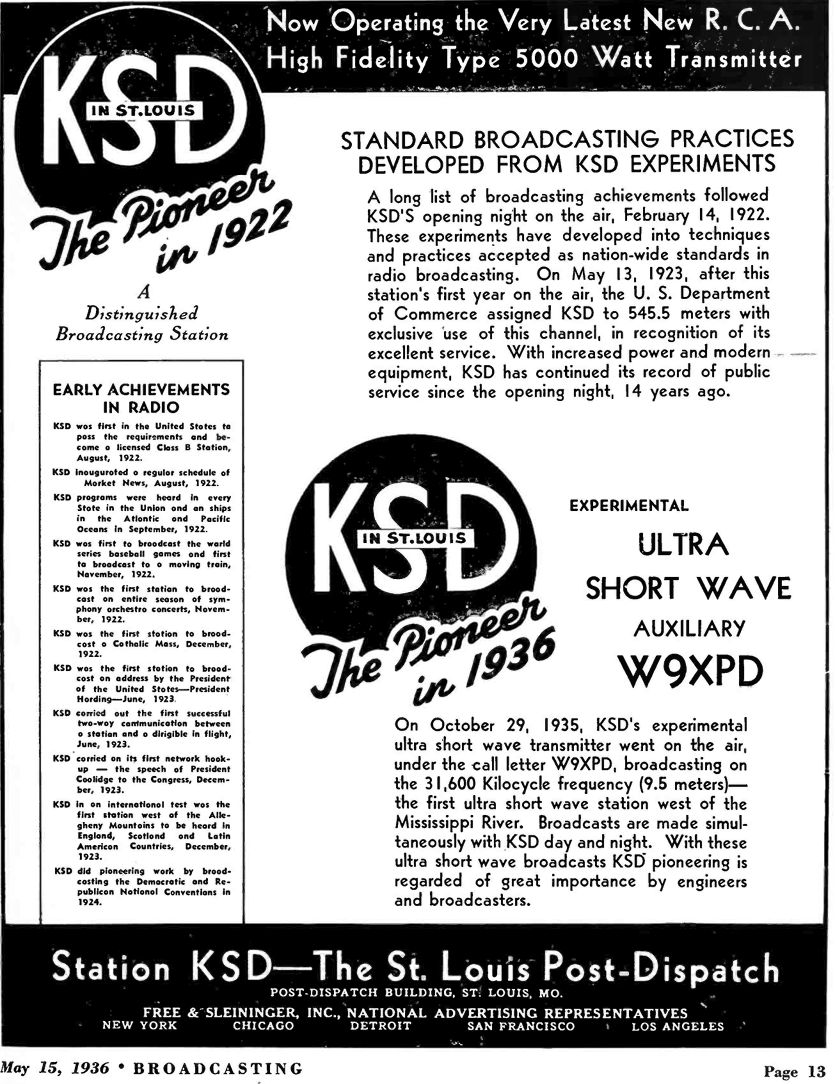
1936 advertisement for KSD and its experimental "apex" station, W9XPD.

The station was originally owned by the St. Louis Post-Dispatch daily newspaper. It began experimental broadcasts in 1921 at a wavelength of 360 meters (833 kHz) with 27 watts of power. The official sign-on took place on June 26, 1922. The original call sign was KSD, standing for Saint Louis Post-Dispatch. Along with WEW and WIL, KSD was among the earliest stations in St. Louis. KMOX didn't come on the air until 1925.

KSD moved to 550 AM in 1923. Power was increased to 5,000 watts daytime and 1,000 watts nighttime in 1934. KSD put a new transmitter in place in November 1948. The station was able to increased its night output to match its daytime output, 5,000 watts. But the nighttime signal required a directional antenna to protect other stations from interference.

=== NBC radio and television ===
KSD was one of the first eight radio stations of the NBC Red Network in 1926. KSD carried NBC's schedule of dramas, comedies, news, sports, soap operas, game shows and big band broadcasts during the "Golden Age of Radio." The NBC network affiliation lasted until the early 1980s. The studios were on the corner of 12th and Olive Streets.

At the end of World War II, KSD put a television station on the air. KSD-TV (now KSDK) debuted on February 8, 1947. Because of KSD Radio's long affiliation with NBC, the TV station also began broadcasting NBC shows. In 1980, the owners of KSD acquired FM station 93.7 KCFM. The call sign was changed to KSD-FM, since those call letters were already well known in the St. Louis radio market. In 1983, the AM station gave up the heritage call sign; the call letters continue on KSD-FM, now owned by iHeartMedia, Inc.

=== MOR, Top 40, News, Country ===
As network programming passed from radio to television, KSD switched to a full service, middle of the road format, playing popular adult music, with news, talk and sports shows. Then as Top 40 radio became more popular, KSD switched to a contemporary hits format in early 1971.

As Top 40 listening shifted from AM to FM radio, KSD began an all-news radio format in early 1980. KSD flipped to country music the following year, and in 1983, KSD became KUSA. It used that call sign for 10 years. March 17, 1993 saw the restoration of the KSD call sign and a switch back to all-news, this time utilizing the CNN Headline News network feed. The station flipped to adult standards in January 1995.

=== Talk radio ===
On April 15, 1996, the station became KTRS and switched to its current Talk radio format. The station was purchased by its current owners, CH Radio Holdings, in 1997.

The station started AM stereo broadcasts in 1983 after rebuilding most of the transmitter to accommodate stereo transmissions. Stereo broadcasts continued throughout most of the 1990s, using the C-QUAM standard. In 1997, KTRS stopped sending stereo programming to the transmitter but continued broadcasting the stereo pilot signal. In 2001, the stereo pilot was silenced.

=== Air personalities ===
In late 2005, KTRS Morning Show hosts Bill Wilkerson and Wendy Wiese, sports director Jim Holder (at the time the public address announcer at the Edward Jones Dome for the NFL Rams' games), Randy Karraker, McGraw Milhaven, Kevin Horrigan, Scott St. James and Meme Wolff were all fired. Management, including program director Al Brady Law, announced plans to bring in a new lineup beginning in January 2006. Law wanted to focus on a younger generation of talk radio hosts.

Milhaven, however, was reinstated during the spring of 2006. Law was fired on December 11 of that year. Wendy Wiese also returned to the station to co-host late mornings.

KTRS announced on October 6, 2010, that it had hired veteran St. Louis radio personality J.C. Corcoran to fill its weekday midday slot starting October 25, 2010. Corcoran was fired on April 27, 2012, and later joined 1380 KXFN. Trish Gazall, who had been John Brown's co-host, joined Corcoran in January 2011 as his producer; Trish Gazall left the station in October 2012 for KEZK-FM.

Steve Cochran, who later worked at WGN in Chicago, hosted a weekday evening talk show on KTRS from 2010 until 2013.

=== Sports franchises ===
KTRS broadcast St. Louis Blues hockey games from 2000 to 2006. In 2006, the Blues moved to competitor KMOX 1120 AM.

After five years (2006–10), KTRS sold the rights to St. Louis Cardinals baseball games to KMOX starting in 2011. The Cardinals nonetheless retained their ownership stake in KTRS and still airs the games of its owned-and-operated farm club, the Memphis Redbirds. With the elimination of the Cardinals, KTRS now airs the University of Missouri Tigers football and men's basketball as well as their weekly sports show, along with occasional high school football contests. For the 2026 NCAA Division I men's basketball tournament, KTRS additionally aired games from the Illinois Fighting Illini men's basketball team after previous affiliate KLIS went off the air.

=== Storm damage ===
In July 2006, severe storms knocked over two of the four transmitting towers. The towers were replaced in 2009. A second storm in 2018 knocked over the #4 tower, which required replacement.

== See also ==
- List of initial AM-band station grants in the United States
