= List of Nigerian Americans =

This is a list of notable Nigerian Americans, including both original immigrants who obtained American citizenship and their American descendants. To be included in this list, the person must have a Wikipedia article showing they are Nigerian American and must have references showing they are Nigerian American and are notable.

== Academia ==
=== Science and engineering ===
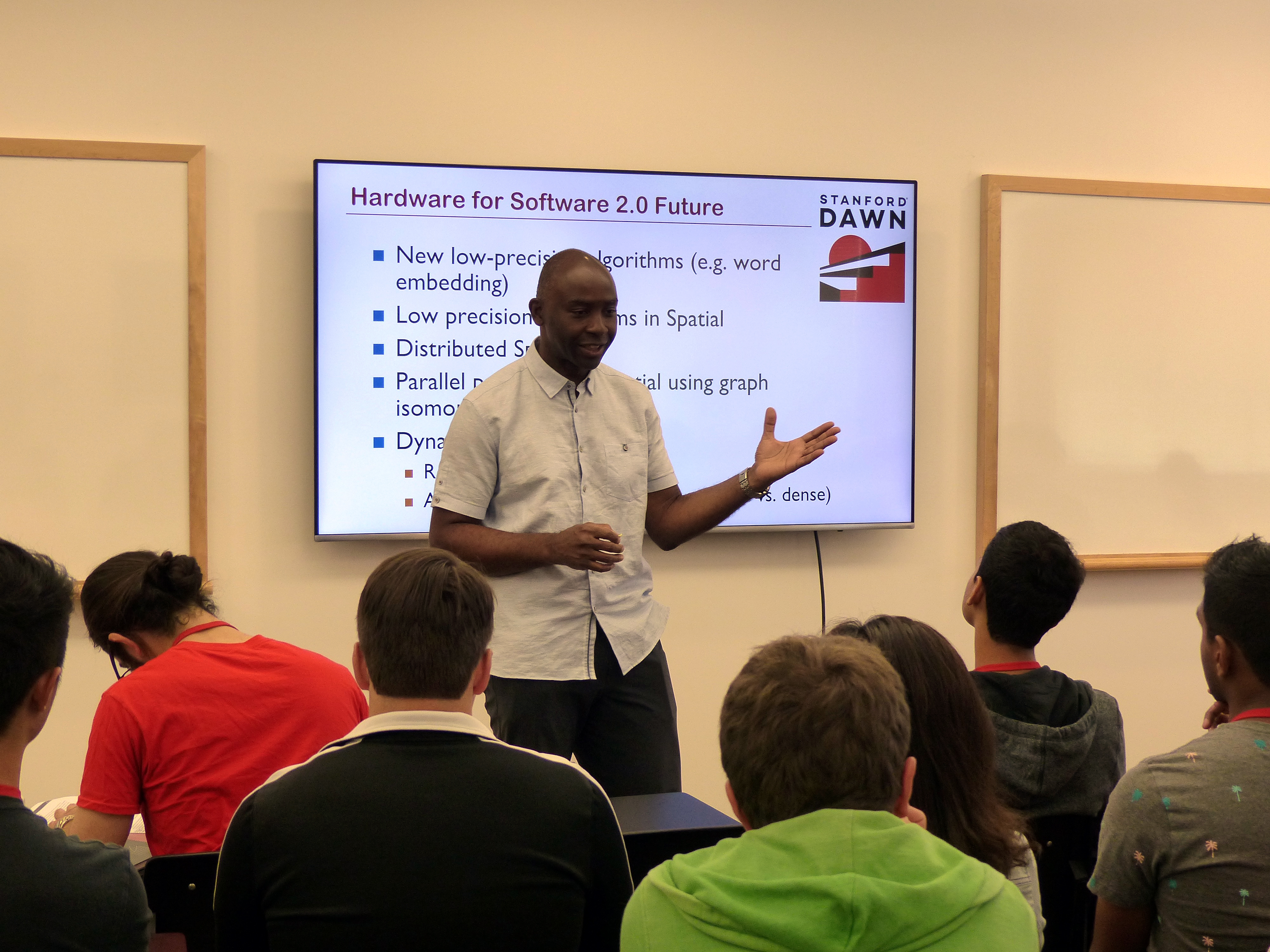
Kunle Olukotun, computer scientist and Cadence Design Systems Professor of the Stanford School of Engineering, professor of electrical engineering and computer science at Stanford University

- Kunle Olukotun, computer engineer and professor of electrical engineering and computer science at Stanford University and director of the Pervasive Parallelism Laboratory
- Ilesanmi Adesida, physicist and material scientist
- Victoria Chibuogu Nneji, computer scientist and roboticist
- Jimmy Adegoke, climatologist
- Omowunmi Sadik, chemist
- Wendy Okolo, aerospace research engineer at NASA Ames Research Center
- Akintunde Akinwande, professor of electrical engineering at the Massachusetts Institute of Technology
- Samson Jenekhe, chemical engineer and professor of chemistry at University of Washington
- Oluwatoyin Asojo, biochemist
- Winston Wole Soboyejo, professor of mechanical engineering at Princeton University and Worcester Polytechnic Institute
- Deji Akinwande, professor of electrical and computer engineering at the University of Texas at Austin, recipient of the Presidential Early Career Award for Scientists and Engineers
- John Dabiri, professor of aerospace engineering at the California Institute of Technology, recipient of MacArthur Fellowship
- Alexander Animalu, theoretical physicist; member of the advisory board of the Physica journal
- Francisca Oboh Ikuenobe, geologist and professor of geology at the Missouri University of Science and Technology
- Soni Oyekan, chemical engineer
- Bolaji Aluko, professor of chemical engineering at Howard University
- Lola Eniola-Adefeso, professor of chemical engineering at University of Michigan
- Ndubuisi Ekekwe, electrical and computer engineer
- Unoma Ndili Okorafor, computer scientist, wife of Ekpe Okorafor, and daughter of nuclear physicist Frank Nwachukwu Ndili
- Philip Emeagwali, computer scientist and 1989 recipient of Gordon Bell Prize
- Tam David-West, academic and virologist

=== Medicine ===
- Latunde Odeku, first Nigerian neurosurgeon trained in the United States; pioneer of neurosurgery in Africa
- Chidi Chike Achebe, physician executive and son of Chinua Achebe
- Bankole Johnson, psychiatrist; discoverer of topiramate, a gamma-aminobutyric acid (GABA) facilitator and glutamate antagonist, as an effective treatment for alcoholism.
- Olufunmilayo Olopade, hematology oncologist; director of the Cancer Risk Clinic at the University of Chicago Medical Center
- Ikenna Ihim, doctor
- Ola Akinboboye, nuclear cardiologist
- Mojisola Adeyeye, pharmacist and professor of pharmaceutics at Duquesne University
- Bennet Omalu, neuropathologist and professor at the University of California, Davis; first to discover and publish findings on chronic traumatic encephalopathy (CTE) in American football players
- Bruce Ovbiagele, Professor of Neurology and Associate Dean at the University of California, San Francisco; Editor-in-Chief of Journal of the American Heart Association; Chief of Staff at the San Francisco VA Medical Center; Founder of the Society for Equity Neuroscience
- Nelson M. Oyesiku, vice chairman of neurological surgery and professor of endocrinology at the Emory University School of Medicine
- Charles Rotimi, geneticist and director of the National Institutes of Health
- Olawale Sulaiman, neurosurgeon; professor of neurosurgery at Tulane University
- Samuel Dagogo-Jack, discoverer of the first radioimmunoassay for epidermal growth factor in human saliva
- Elizabeth Ofili, physician and cardiology researcher
- Chidi Chike Achebe, physician executive
- Jacqueline Nwando Olayiwola, Chair Professor of the Department of Family Medicine at The Ohio State University Wexner Medical Center
- Clement Adebamowo, epidemiologist
- Folakemi T. Odedina, professor of pharmacy and medicine at University of Florida
- Andrew Agwunobi, CEO of UConn Health

=== Humanities and social sciences ===
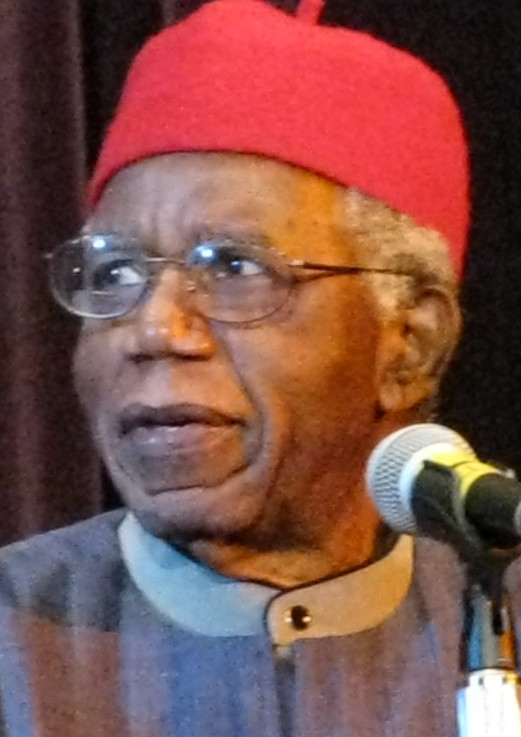
Chinua Achebe

- Kola Tubosun, linguist and founder of The YorubaName Project
- Jacob Olupona, professor of African Studies and African American Studies at Harvard University
- Abiola Irele, literary scholar and former professor at Harvard University
- Claude Ake, political scientist, former professor at Columbia University and Yale University
- Chinua Achebe, award-winning novelist, professor, literary scholar, and author of Things Fall Apart
- Nwando Achebe, historian, feminist scholar, and daughter of Chinua Achebe
- Farooq Kperogi, journalist and professor of journalism at Kennesaw State University
- Nwando Achebe, historian and feminist scholar; professor of history at Michigan State University
- Toyin Falola, historian and professor of African Studies
- Bamidele A. Ojo, political scientist and professor of Political science and International studies
- John Ogbu, anthropologist, "acting white" theorist
- Ekpo Eyo, archaeologist and professor of African arts and Archeology at University of Maryland
- Akinwumi Ogundiran, archaeologist, Chancellor's Professor and Professor of Africana Studies, Anthropology & History at UNC Charlotte.
- Obiwu (Obioma Paul Iwuanyanwu), writer and professor of English and creating writing at Central State University
- Wendy Osefo, public affairs academic, professor at the Johns Hopkins School of Education, and television personality
- Emmanuel Chukwudi Eze, philosopher
- Nkiru Nzegwu, philosopher and Distinguished Professor for Research at State University of New York at Binghamton
- Kalu Ndukwe Kalu, political scientist and Distinguished Research Professor of Political Science and National Security Policy at Auburn University
- Stephen Adebanji Akintoye, academic, historian and writer
- Saheed Aderinto, professor of history at Western Carolina University
- Elechukwu Njaka, political scientist; author of Igbo Political Culture
- Olu Oguibe, professor of art at the University of Connecticut and senior fellow at the Smithsonian Institution in Washington, DC
- Chika Okeke-Agulu, art historian
- Joy Ogwu, political scientist
- Leslye Obiora, professor of law at University of Arizona
- Tejumola Olaniyan, Louise Durham Mead Professor of English and African Cultural Studies, and the Wole Soyinka Professor of the Humanities at the University of Wisconsin–Madison
- Esiaba Irobi, Associate Professor of International Theatre and Film Studies at Ohio University, Athens, USA
- Babatunde Lawal, Professor of Art History at Virginia Commonwealth University.

=== Mathematics ===
- Nkechi Agwu, ethnomathematician and historian of mathematics
- Abba Gumel, computational mathematician and mathematical biologist, professor at Arizona State University
- Chike Obi, pure mathematician
- Kate Okikiolu, mathematical analyst
- Yewande Olubummo, mathematical analyst
- Grace Alele-Williams, professor of mathematics education

=== Academic administration ===
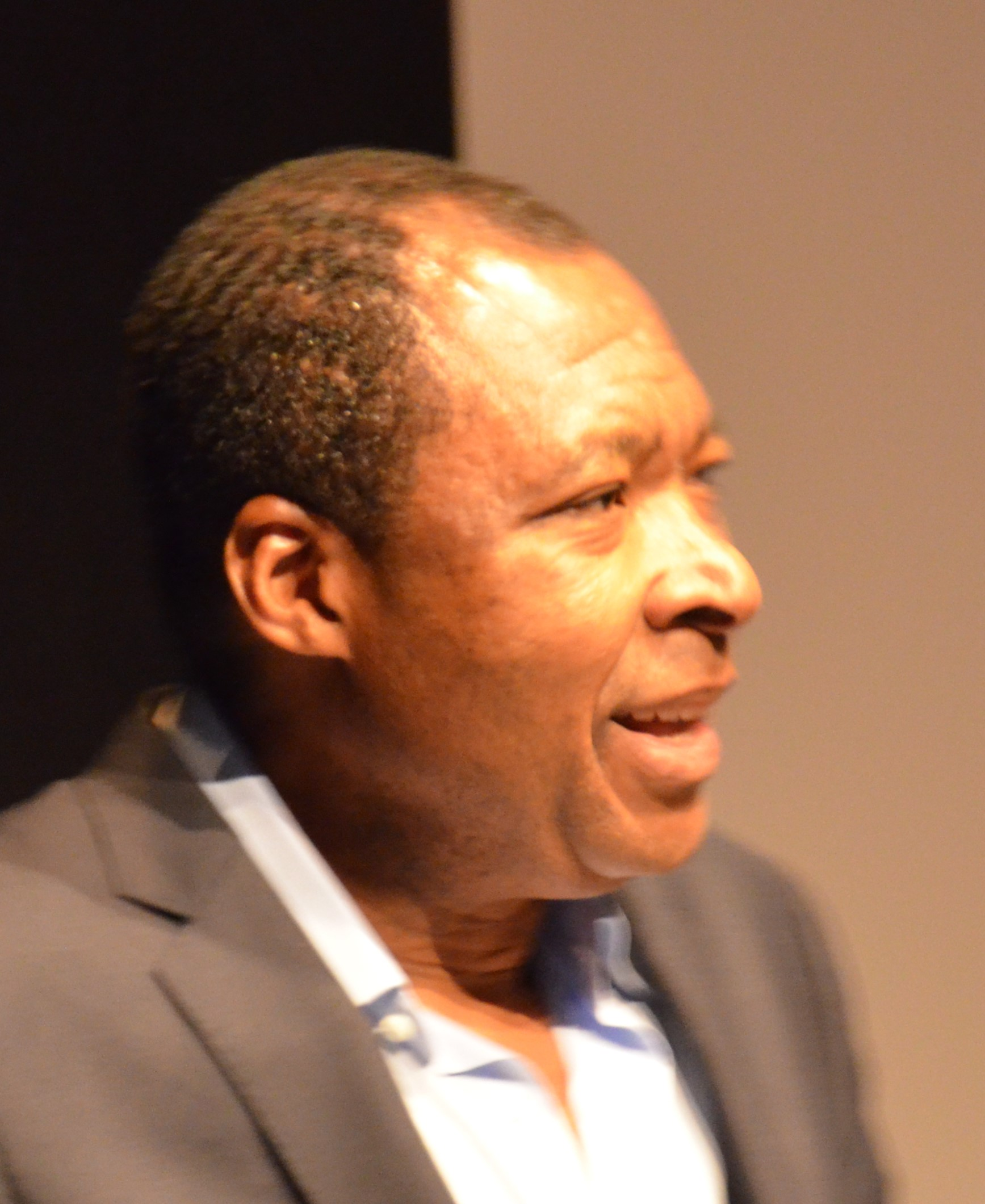
Okwui Enwezor

- Victor Ukpolo, chancellor of the Southern University at New Orleans
- Benjamin Akande, president of Champlain College and Westminster College
- Babatunde Ogunnaike, dean of the College of Engineering at the University of Delaware
- Joseph Abiodun Balogun, dean of the College of Health Sciences at Chicago State University
- Ilesanmi Adesida, dean and professor emeritus of engineering at the Grainger College of Engineering (University of Illinois at Urbana-Champaign), provost at Nazarbayev University (in Kazakhstan)
- Johnson O. Akinleye, chancellor of North Carolina Central University
- ImeIme Umana, president of Harvard Law Review
- Nwando Achebe, Associate Dean for Diversity, Equity, and Inclusion in the College of Social Science at Michigan State University
- Okwui Enwezor, senior vice president of San Francisco Art Institute
- John Dabiri, Centennial Chair Professor at California Institute of Technology
- Andrew Agwunobi, president of University of Connecticut
- Toyin Tofade, president of Albany College of Pharmacy and Health Sciences

== Activism ==
- Chief Temitope Ajayi, activist
- Morénike Giwa-Onaiwu, autism and HIV advocate
- Colion Noir (Collins Iyare Idehen Jr.), gun rights activist and spokesperson for the National Rifle Association
- Oluwatoyin Salau, activist and murder victim
- Opeoluwa Sotonwa, disability rights activist
- Omoyele Sowore, human rights activist
- Opal Tometi, social activist and co-founder of Black Lives Matter

== Business ==
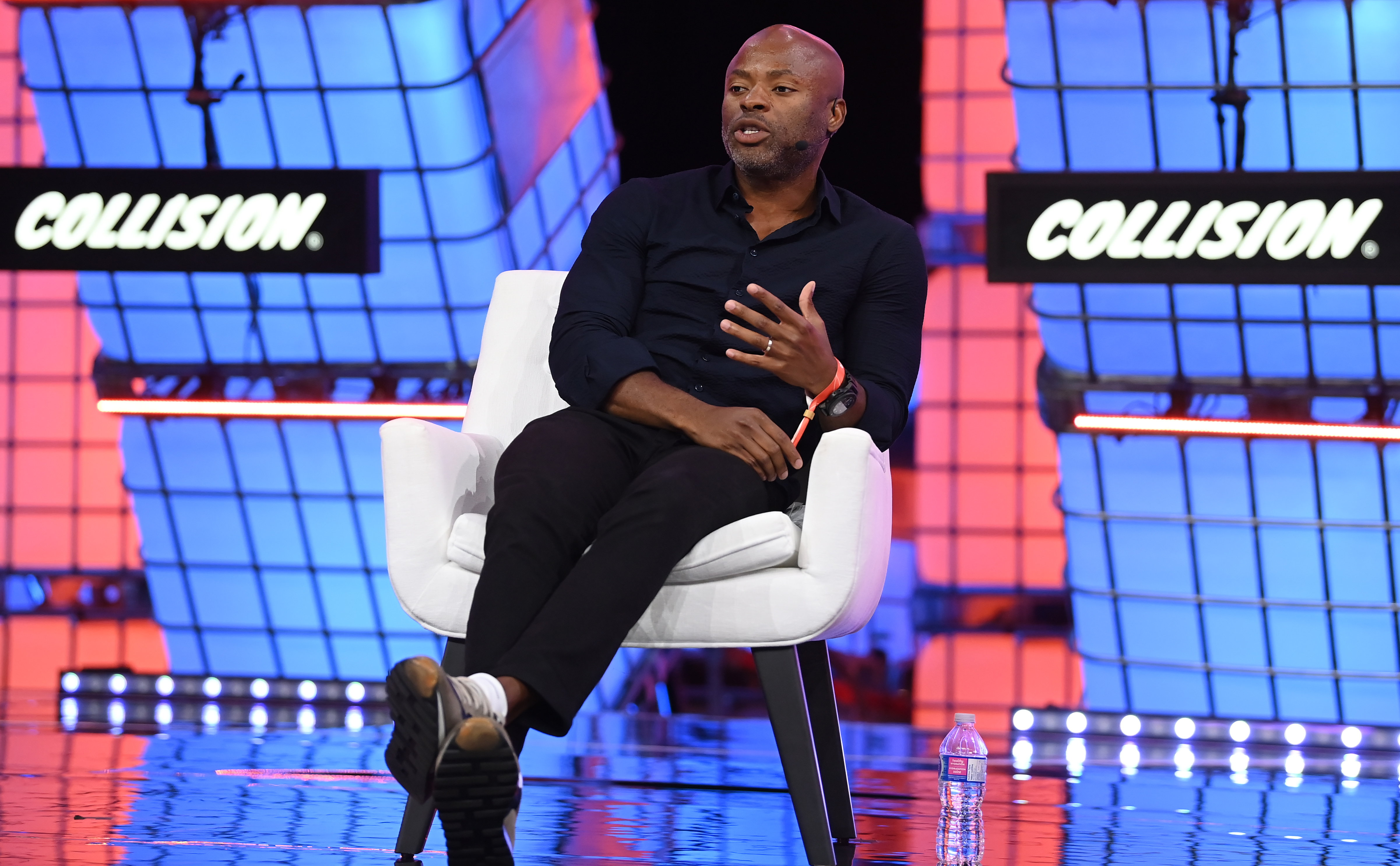
Tope Awotona, billionaire, founder and CEO of Calendly

- Tope Awotona, billionaire CEO and founder of Calendly, estimated net worth of 1,4 billion as of 2024. Forbes has described Awotana as one of the wealthiest immigrants and one of richest black tech entrepreneurs
- Temie Giwa-Tubosun, founder of LifeBank
- Kunle Olukotun, founder of Afara Websystems
- Pearlena Igbokwe, chairman of Universal Studios Group (division of NBCUniversal)
- Jessica O. Matthews, venture capitalist and co-inventor of Soccket
- John O. Agwunobi, pediatrician, former fourth-star admiral of the United States Public Health Service Commissioned Corps, former senior vice-president of Walmart, CEO of Herbalife
- Lazarus Angbazo, president and CEO of General Electric in Nigeria
- Tayo Oviosu, founder and CEO of Paga
- Ndubuisi Ekekwe, founder and CEO of First Atlantic Semiconductors & Microelectronics
- Soni Oyekan, CEO of Prafis Energy Solutions
- Bisi Ezerioha, automotive engineer, racecar driver, industrialist, and CEO of Bisimoto Engineering
- Adebayo Alonge, founder and CEO of RxAll Inc.
- Nneka Egbujiobi, founder and CEO of Hello Africa
- Michael Boulos, business executive and partner of Tiffany Trump
- Adebayo Ogunlesi, investment banker, Chairman and Managing Partner at Global Infrastructure Partners
- Maya Horgan Famodu, venture capitalist and founder of Ingressive
- Ngozi Okonjo-Iweala, Director-General, World Trade Organization
- Magnus L. Kpakol, Texas-based CEO and chairman of Economic and Business Strategies; former chief economic advisor to President Olusegun Obasanjo of Nigeria
- Chris Aire, president of Solid 21 Incorporated
- Angelica Nwandu, founder of The Shade Room
- Tiyan Alile, celebrity chef and restaurateur
- Ope Amosu, chef and restaurateur

== Government and politics ==
- Solomon Adesanya, Democratic member of the Georgia House of Representatives (2023–present)
- Wally Adeyemo, United States Deputy Secretary of the Treasury (2021–present)
- Esther Agbaje, Democratic member of the Minnesota House of Representatives (2021–present)
- John O. Agwunobi, former Secretary of United States Department of Health and Human Services (2006–2007)
- Yinka Faleti, Democratic candidate for Missouri Secretary of State in the 2020 election
- Carol Kazeem, Pennsylvania State Representative
- Richard Komi, former Democratic member of the New Hampshire House of Representatives (2018–2020)
- Gabe Okoye, Democratic member of the Georgia House of Representatives (2023–present)
- Emmanuel Onunwor, former mayor of East Cleveland, Ohio (1998–2004)
- Vop Osili, president of the Indianapolis City-County Council (2018–present)
- Oye Owolewa, Democratic shadow representative for the District of Columbia in the United States House of Representatives (2021–present)
- Yemi Mobolade, mayor of Colorado Springs, Colorado (2023–present)

== Journalism ==
- Sade Baderinwa, TV news anchor
- Michael Okwu, Television personality
- Steve Osunsami, News correspondent
- Lola Ogunnaike, entertainment journalist
- Adaora Udoji, Court TV host; CNN correspondent
- Bukola Oriola, journalist
- Ijeoma Oluo, author and commentator
- Wendy Osefo, political commentator
- Alexis Okeowo, staff writer at The New Yorker
- Chika Oduah, correspondent for VICE News
- Toluse Olorunnipa, White House Bureau Chief for The Washington Post
- Chike Frankie Edozien, director of New York University, Accra
- Karen Attiah, editor for The Washington Post

== Sports ==
=== Basketball ===
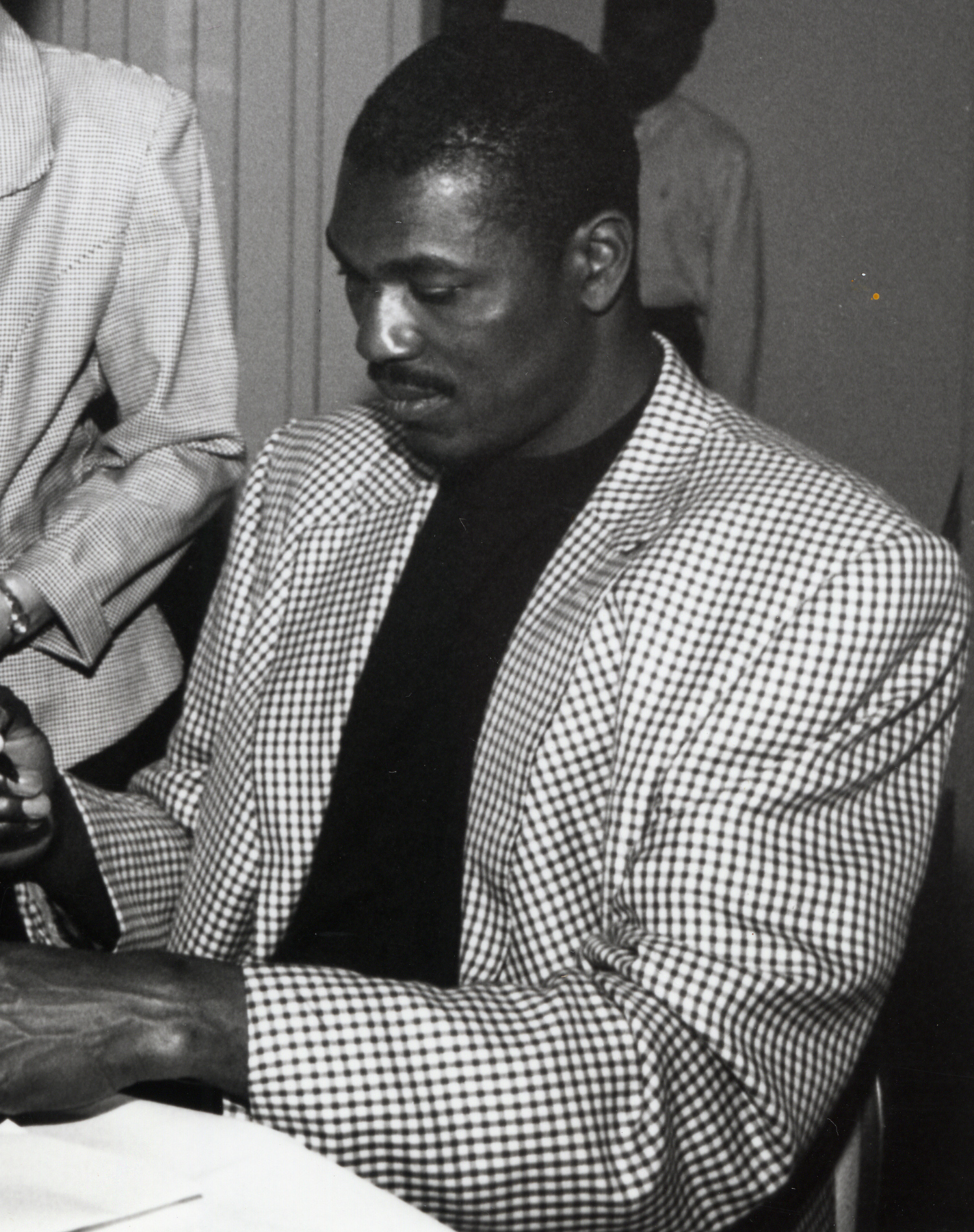
Hakeem Olajuwon

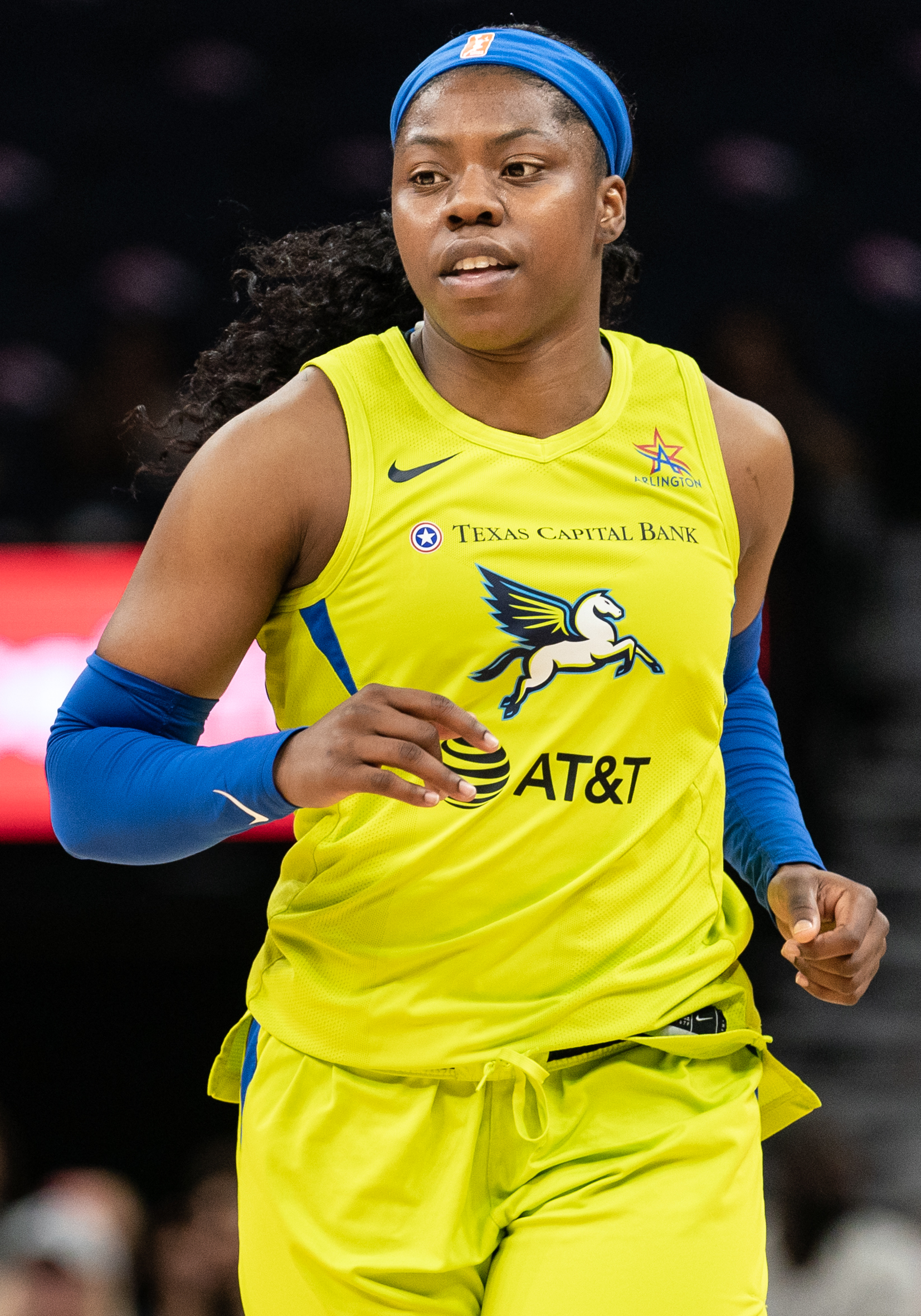
Arike Ogunbowale

- Bam Adebayo
- Kenny Adeleke
- Ochai Agbaji
- Josh Akognon
- Alade Aminu
- Al-Farouq Aminu
- Aloysius Anagonye
- Giannis Antetokounmpo
- Koko Archibong
- Deandre Ayton
- Kelenna Azubuike
- Udoka Azubuike
- Suleiman Braimoh
- Ike Diogu
- Ayo Dosunmu
- Queen Egbo
- Obinna Ekezie
- Ebi Ere
- Festus Ezeli
- Ekene Ibekwe
- Andre Iguodala
- Gani Lawal
- Shane Lawal
- Ike Nwankwo
- Jordan Nwora
- Derrick Obasohan
- Tai Odiase
- Chamberlain Oguchi
- Arike Ogunbowale
- Chiney Ogwumike
- Nneka Ogwumike
- Semi Ojeleye
- Emeka Okafor
- Jahlil Okafor
- Nick Okorie
- Michaela Onyenwere
- Oso Ighodaro
- Oderah Chidom
- Isaac Okoro
- Stan Okoye
- Victor Oladipo
- Abi Olajuwon
- Hakeem Olajuwon
- Isaac Okoro
- Ekpe Udoh
- Ime Udoka
- Mfon Udoka

=== American football ===
- Victor Abiamiri
- Emmanuel Acho
- Sam Acho
- Victor Aiyewa
- Jay Ajayi
- Josh Aladenoye
- Obed Ariri
- Nnamdi Asomugha
- Jeremiah Attaochu
- Chidobe Awuzie
- Akin Ayodele
- Remi Ayodele
- Edefuan Ulofoshio
- Prince Amukamara
- Chris Banjo
- Josiah Ezirim
- Samuel Eguavoen
- Isaiah Ekejiuba
- IK Enemkpali
- Tayo Fabuluje
- Olu Fashanu
- Samkon Gado
- Akbar Gbaja-Biamila
- James Ihedigbo
- Israel Idonije
- Buchie Ibeh
- Bobby Iwuchukwu
- Brian Iwuh
- Chidi Iwuoma
- Ade Jimoh
- Adisa Isaac
- N. D. Kalu
- Benson Mayowa
- Ovie Mughelli
- Chinedum Ndukwe
- Kitan Oladapo
- Ike Ndukwe
- David Njoku
- Ty Nsekhe
- Uzoma Nwachukwu
- Uche Nwaneri
- David Ojabo
- Chukky Okobi
- Amobi Okoye
- Christian Okoye
- Chike Okeafor
- Alex Okafor
- Iheanyi Uwaezuoke
- Chris Ogbonnaya
- Cedric Ogbuehi
- Vince Oghobaase
- Eric Ogbogu
- Azeez Ojulari
- Brian Orakpo
- Kelechi Osemele
- Babatunde Oshinowo
- Kenechi Udeze
- Cyril Obiozor
- Justin Eboigbe
- Tony Ugoh
- Valerian Ume-Ezeoke
- Cheta Ozougwu
- Adewale Ogunleye
- Russell Okung
- Christian Sam

=== Soccer ===
- Abuchi Obinwa
- Oguchi Onyewu
- Owen Otasowie
- Bo Oshoniyi
- Courtney Dike
- Ade Coker
- Maurice Edu
- Jean Harbor
- Daryl Dike
- Folarin Balogun
- Amaechi Igwe
- Chioma Igwe
- Ugo Ihemelu
- Bright Dike
- Chioma Ubogagu

=== Martial arts and Professional Wrestling ===
- Sesugh Uhaa (Apollo Crews), professional wrestler
- Chike Lindsay, kickboxer
- Anthony Njokuani, kickboxer and mixed martial artist
- Muhammed Lawal, mixed martial artist
- Kamaru Usman, UFC fighter
- Tolulope "Jordan" Omogbehin (Omos), professional wrestler and former college basketball player
- Quinn O. Ojinnaka, professional wrestler and former American football player

=== Other ===
- Tanitoluwa Adewumi, chess player
- Foluke Akinradewo, volleyball player
- Jesse Iwuji, NASCAR driver
- Ogonna Nnamani, volleyball player
- Michael Petersen, baseball player
- Mary Akor, long-distance runner
- Ifeoma Mbanugo, long-distance runner
- Tuedon Morgan, long-distance runner

== Music ==
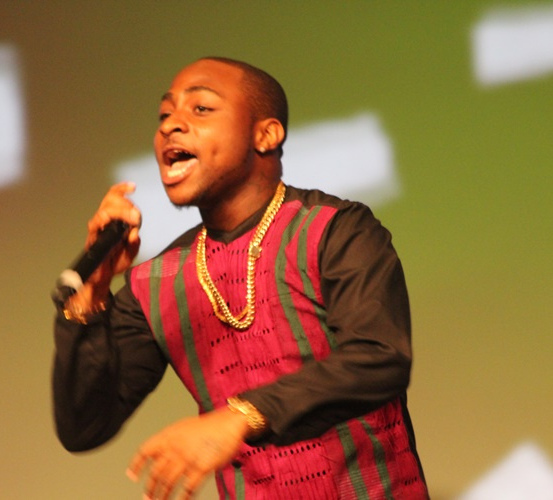
Davido

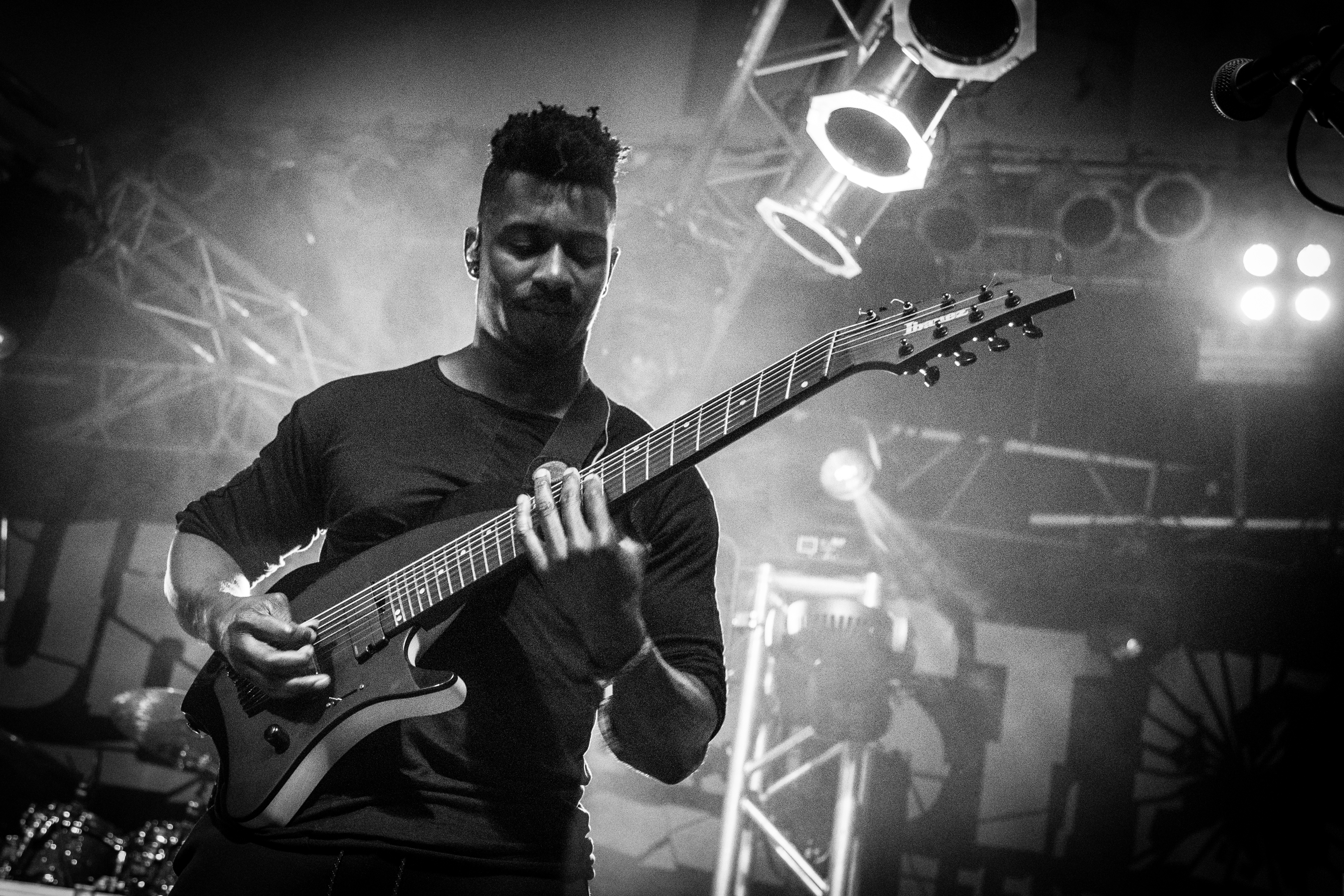
Tosin Abasi

- Abiodun Koya, classical opera
- AQT
- Tosin Abasi, lead guitarist of Animals as Leaders
- Tunde Adebimpe, musician, actor
- Anike (formerly known as Wande), rapper, A&R
- Tunji Balogun, record label executive
- Chamillionaire, rapper
- eLDee, musician, record label executive
- Chika, rapper
- Chikezie, singer
- Cozz, rapper
- Davido, musician
- Daniel Nwosu Jr., rapper, country singer aka Dax
- Fat Tony, rapper
- Ilacoin, musician, creator of the "Pause" game
- Jidenna, rapper
- Kami de Chukwu, rapper
- Lil' O, rapper
- Fela Sowande, musician and composer
- Maxo Kream, rapper
- Kevin Olusola, cellist and singer-songwriter
- Toby Foyeh, guitarist, singer, composer, and producer
- Tony Okungbowa, DJ
- Kevin Olusola, musician, beatboxer
- Shaboozey, rapper, singer, and music producer
- Sonny Digital, music producer
- Tyler, The Creator, rapper
- Michael Uzowuru, music producer
- Wale, rapper
- Patrice Wilson, music producer
- Fred Onovwerosuoke, composer
- Ahamefule J. Oluo, jazz trumpeter
- Tobe Nwigwe, rapper
- VanJess, R&B duo
- Dot da Genius, music producer
- Jhene Aiko, R&B singer

== Film ==
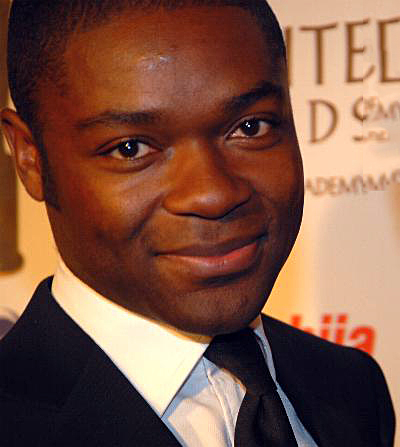
David Oyelowo

- Uzo Aduba, actress
- Sope Aluko, actress
- Gbenga Akinnagbe, actor
- Adewale Akinnuoye-Agbaje, actor
- Julius Onah, director
- Chet Anekwe, actor
- Michael Evans Behling, actor
- David Oyelowo, actor
- Megalyn Echikunwoke, actress
- Rick Famuyiwa, director
- Nkechi Okoro Carroll, movie producer
- Osas Ighodaro, actress
- Annie Ilonzeh, actress
- Nyambi Nyambi, actor
- Laide Daramola, filmmaker
- Chido Nwokocha, actor
- Adepero Oduye, actress
- Dayo Okeniyi, actor
- Olatunde Osunsanmi, director
- Chiké Okonkwo, actor
- Folake Olowofoyeku, actress
- Okieriete Onaodowan, actor
- Yvonne Orji, actress
- Rotimi, actor
- Chet Anekwe, actor
- Kelechi Eke, director, actor
- Chuku Modu, actor
- Sam Adegoke, actor
- Chinonye Chukwu, director
- Susan Nwokedi, filmmaker
- Ego Nwodim, actress, comedian
- Gina Yashere, actress, comedian
- Eme Ikwuakor, actor
- Jovan Adepo, actor
- Myles Grier, TV actor, producer, writer
- Joy Sunday, actress
- Ayo Edebiri, actress, writer

== Literature ==
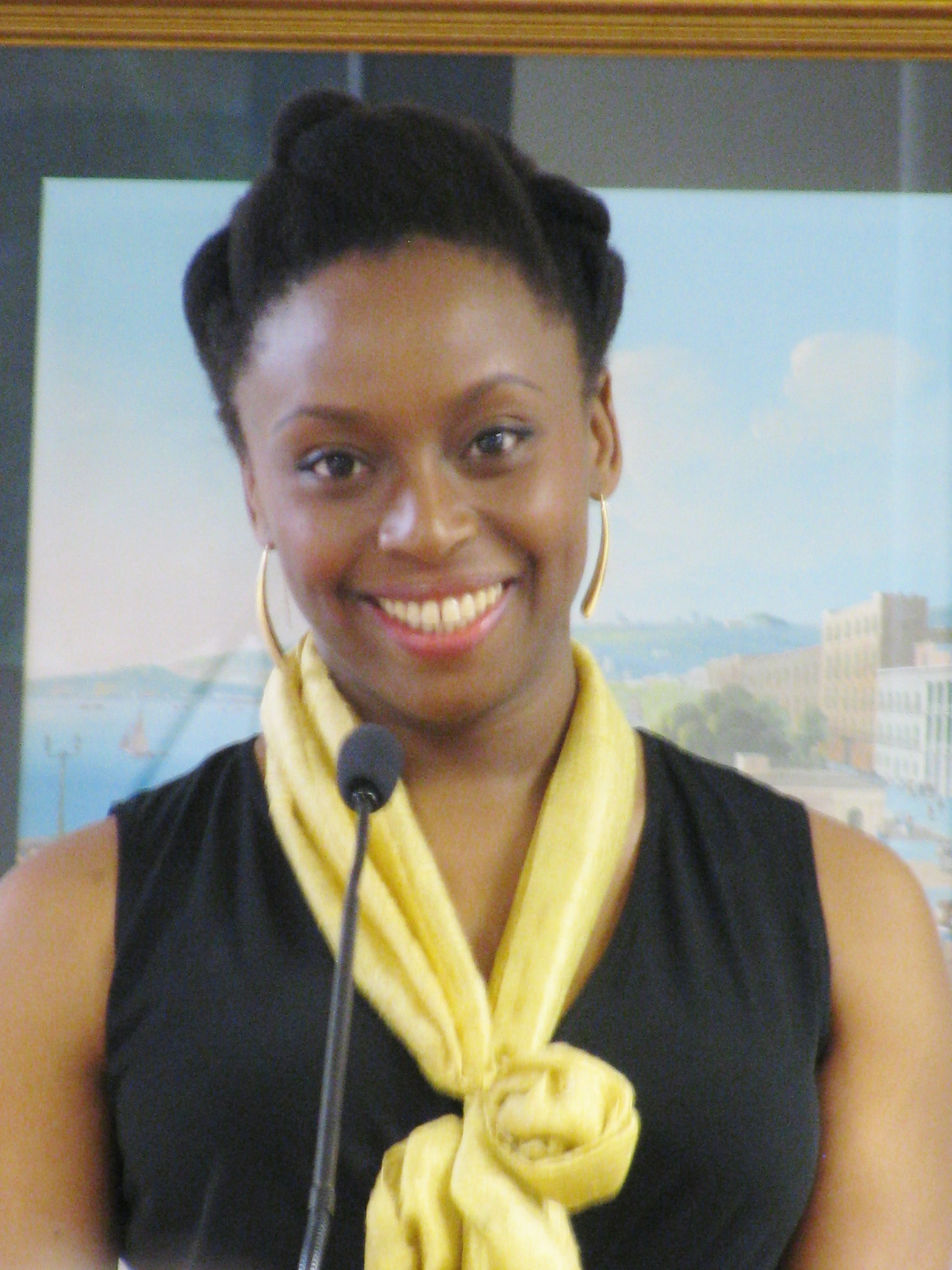
Chimamanda Ngozi Adichie

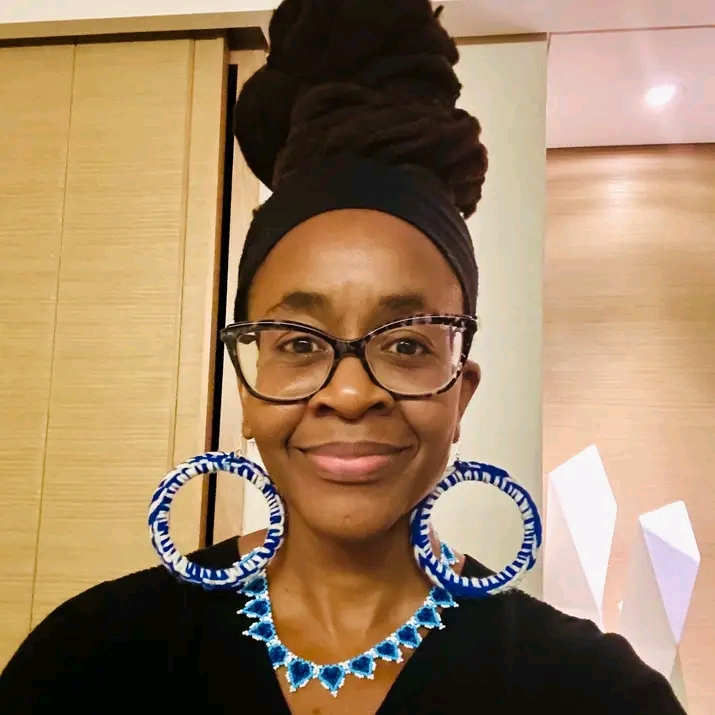
Nnedi Okorafor

- Chimamanda Ngozi Adichie, MacArthur Fellow
- Nnedi Okorafor, recipient of Nebula and Hugo Award
- Chris Abani, writer and poet
- Tomi Adeyemi, novelist
- Adaeze Atuegwu, writer
- Tochi Onyebuchi, novelist
- Jordan Ifueko, novelist
- Teju Cole, writer and artist
- Akwaeke Emezi, writer
- Chinelo Okparanta, novelist
- Uzodinma Iweala, novelist
- Uche Nduka, poet
- Bayo Ojikutu, creative writer

== Visual arts ==
- Oshoke Abalu, architect and futurist
- Ibiyinka Alao, architect
- Ini Archibong, designer
- Mobolaji Dawodu, fashion designer
- Victor Ekpuk, artist
- Marcia Kure, artist
- Amarachi Nwosu, documentary filmmaker and photographer
- Mendi & Keith Obadike, artists
- Izzy Odigie, choreographer
- Toyin Ojih Odutola, graphic artist
- Suzanna Ogunjami, artist
- Ade A. Olufeko, technologist and international curator
- Adejoke Tugbiyele, sculptor
- Kehinde Wiley, portrait painter

== Other ==
- Olivia Anakwe, model
- Luvvie Ajayi, comedian and blogger
- Kimberly Anyadike, pilot
- Uzo Asonye, partner at Davis Polk & Wardwell
- Yinka Faleti, United States Army officer
- Godfrey Danchimah, Jr., comedian
- Mayowa Nicholas, model
- Nimay Ndolo, media personality and software developer
- Danny Anene, Social Media Personality, Tiktok star, also known as MaccDonny
