= AQT =

AQT may refer to:

- Nuiqsut Airport, Alaska, United States
- Avioquintana, a Mexican airline
- AQT (singer), US-based Nigerian musician
