= Demola =

- Gender: Male
- Language: Yoruba

Origin
- Origin: Nigeria
- Region of origin: Southwestern

pronunciation

Demola is a Yoruba masculine given name. Notable people with the given name include:

- Demola Aladekomo (born 1957), a Nigerian computer engineer
- Demola Seriki (1959 – 2022), a Nigerian politician
