= Mobolaji =

- Gender: Male
- Language: Yoruba

Origin
- Origin: Nigeria
- Meaning: I woke up with wealth
- Region of origin: Southwestern Nigeria

pronunciation

Mobolaji is a unisex given name of Yoruba origin which means (I woke up with wealth).

== Notable people ==
- Mobolaji Akiode (born 1982), American-born Nigerian basketball player
- Mobolaji Bank Anthony (1907–1991), Nigerian businessman and philanthropist
- Mobolaji Dawodu, Nigerian–American fashion stylist
- Luti Fagbenle (Oladoke Lutiseku Mobolaji Fagbenle), British actor, film producer and businessman
- Mobolaji Johnson (1936–2019), Nigerian Army officer and politician
- Israel Adesanya (Israel Mobolaji Temitayo Odunayo Oluwafemi Owolabi Adesanya; born 1989), Nigerian–New Zealand mixed martial artist
