= ChòpnBlọk =

West African restaurant in Houston, Texas

Coordinates: 29°44′39″N 95°23′16″W

ChòpnBlọk is a West African restaurant in Houston, Texas. Started by Ope Amosu, it began as a pop-up series in 2018 before opening its first location in the POST Houston food hall on Nigerian Independence Day in 2021. Its brick-and-mortar restaurant opened in 2024 in the Montrose neighborhood.

ChòpnBlọk’s Montrose location includes custom art by visual artist Uzo Njoku and was designed in collaboration with Amao Creative and Gin Design Group. The restaurant features a collection of books from Kindred Stories and handmade African products from Root To Home.

== Awards and accolades ==
ChòpnBlọk was included in the New York Times' 50 best restaurants in 2025. In 2025, the Michelin Guide awarded it with a Bib Gourmand designation. Esquire named the restaurant one of the best new American restaurants in 2025. The Houston Chronicle placed it at tenth place on its 2025 list of Top 100 Restaurants.

== See also ==
- List of Michelin Bib Gourmand restaurants in the United States
