= Tomiwa =

- Gender: Male
- Language: Yoruba

Origin
- Word/name: Nigeria
- Meaning: comes to me

listen

The unisex name Tomiwa means "comes to me" in the Yoruba language. It is pronounced toh-MEE-wah (/toˈmi.wa/) and is known for its unique and melodic sound. Associated with strength, resilience, and determination, it has grown in popularity over the years. Variants like Tommy and Tommie offer alternative forms. Tomiwa embodies cultural richness and individuality, making it a powerful and distinctive choice.

== People ==
- Tomiwa Aladekomo, internet entrepreneur and politician
- Tomiwa Edun, actor
- Tomiwa Owolade, journalist
