= Ndubuisi Ekekwe =

Nigerian professor, inventor, engineer, author, and entrepreneur

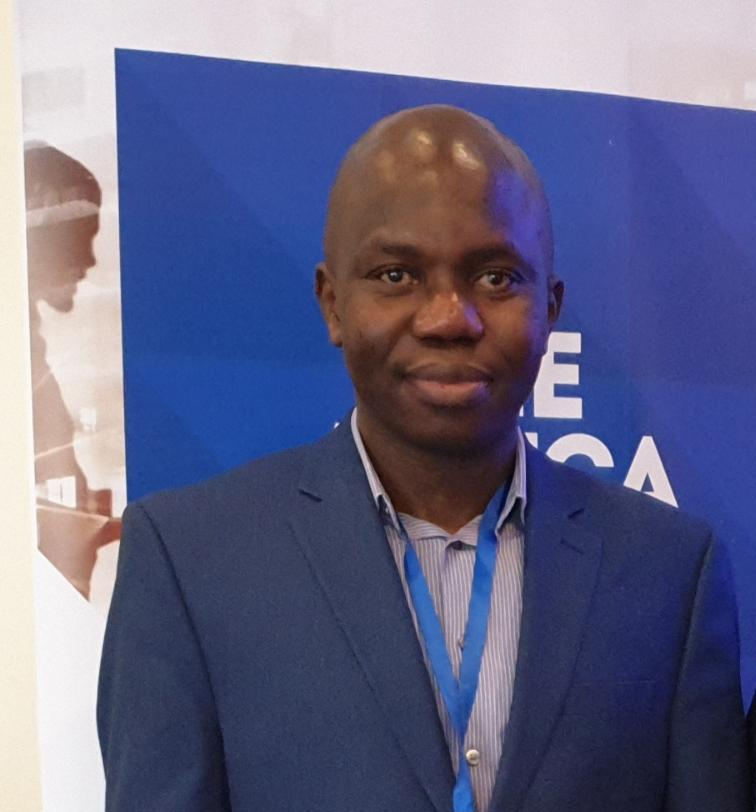
- Born: July 1975 (age 51); Isuikwuato, Nigeria
- Citizenship: Nigeria
- Education: Federal University of Technology Owerri; Johns Hopkins University; St. Clements University; Tuskegee University; University of Calabar
- Awards: World Economic Forum Young Global Leader
- Scientific career
- Fields: Electrical and Computer Engineering
- Workplaces: IEEE; Carnegie Mellon University; Babcock University; IBM; Famiscro Group; Covenant University
- Website: www.tekedia.com

Ndubuisi Ekekwe (born July 1975) is a Nigerian business person. He is the founder of First Atlantic Semiconductors & Microelectronics , West Africa's leading embedded systems company. His working experience includes Analog Devices Corp where he co-designed a generation accelerometer for the iPhone and created the company's first wafer level chip scale package for inertial sensor. He is a player in the U.S. semiconductor industry where he develops innovative microchip and invented a micro-controller for medical robots. Ndubuisi Ekekwe was named in 2020 by The Guardian (Nigeria) as one of 60 Nigerians In 60 Years Making “Nigerian Lives Matter”.

== Early life and education ==
Ekekwe was born in Ovim, Isuikwuato in Abia State southeast Nigeria. He is from the Igbo ethnic group in Nigeria. He attended the Secondary Technical School where he set a record by obtaining eight distinctions. He then proceeded to the Federal University of Technology, Owerri where he obtained a bachelor's degree in Electrical engineering and graduated as his class’ best student. Ndubuisi holds two doctoral and four master's degrees, including an MTech from Federal University of Technology, Akure, Ms from Tuskegee University, USA and MBA from University of Calabar. He obtained two Doctorates in Management from St. Clements University and Electrical & Computer Engineering where he specialised in Microelectronics & Medical Robotics Engineering from the Johns Hopkins University, USA. Some of his research work involved manufacturing of integrated circuits with the application of alternative energies, biomedical engineering, medical robotics and neuromorphic engineering.

== Professional career ==
Ekekwe is a US semiconductor industry veteran and has served in the United States National Science Foundation Engineering Research Center E&D Committee. Ekekwe is a Co-Chairman of JPL Financial Group, a California-based financial advisory firm which syndicates capital for projects in Africa. As the founder of African Institution of Technology, he facilitates the provision of practical education support, encourages enactment of technology policies and facilitates the bottom-up creativity technology emanating from African economies.

The African Leadership Network has honoured him as a “New Generation Leader for Africa”. He was honoured by the World Economic Forum in 2013 as a Young Global Leader for his professional accomplishments and commitment to society. He has also been honoured for Outstanding Leadership by the National Youth Council Of Nigeria.

== See also ==
- Silas Adekunle
- Demola Aladekomo
- Olalekan Adeeko
