= Muhammad Sirajo Aliyu =

Nigerian computer scientist

- Citizenship: Nigeria
- Education: Usmanu Danfodiyo University Sokoto; University of Technology Malaysia
- Occupation: computer scientist
- Employer: Federal University Dutse

Muhammad Sirajo Aliyu is a Nigerian computer scientist. He is an associate professor of computer science at the Federal University Dutse in Jigawa State and is currently serving a four-year term as the elected president of the Nigeria Computer Society.

== Education ==
He holds a BS in computer science from Usmanu Danfodiyo University Sokoto, a postgraduate diploma in education from the University of Calabar, a master’s degree in computer science from Bayero University Kano, and a PhD in computer science from University of Technology Malaysia.

== Academic and professional roles ==
Aliyu began his career as a lecturer at the College of Agriculture, Lafia, Nasarawa State, where he established and led the Information Technology Unit. In 2006, he returned to Katsina State, accepting a tenure-track position as a lecturer at Hassan Usman Katsina Polytechnic where he served in various roles, including Examination Officer, Acting Head of Computer Department, ICT Manager and ICT Coordinator.

He coordinated an IT competition organised by Nigeria Computer Society at the State and Northwest Zone level. Aliyu also participated in IT Institute Accreditation processes organised by the Computer Registration Council of Nigeria.

Aliyu is director of information communication technology at Federal University Dutse and has previously held several positions including head of the cybersecurity department, coordinator of the Department of Computer Science postgraduate programme, and faculty of computing postgraduate coordinator. He is also a board member of the National Information Technology Development Agency and a member of the National Council for Digital Innovation and Entrepreneurship.

== Leadership in professional organisations ==
Aliyu currently serves as the 15th President of the Nigeria Computer Society becoming the first individual from the Northern region of Nigeria to be elected as the President of the Nigeria Computer Society and he has held various leadership positions within the society, including Chairman of the Katsina Chapter, Northwest Zone Coordinator and Deputy President for two terms, during which he facilitated the activation of several states chapters.

Aliyu is a Chartered Information Technology Professional, President of the Nigeria Computer Society and member of several professional bodies.

== Personal life ==
Aliyu is married and has children. He is a sportsman and practicing farmer.

== See also ==
- Abisiga Mojeed Damilola
- Olalekan Adeeko
- Demola Aladekomo
