= Huecco =

Spanish singer

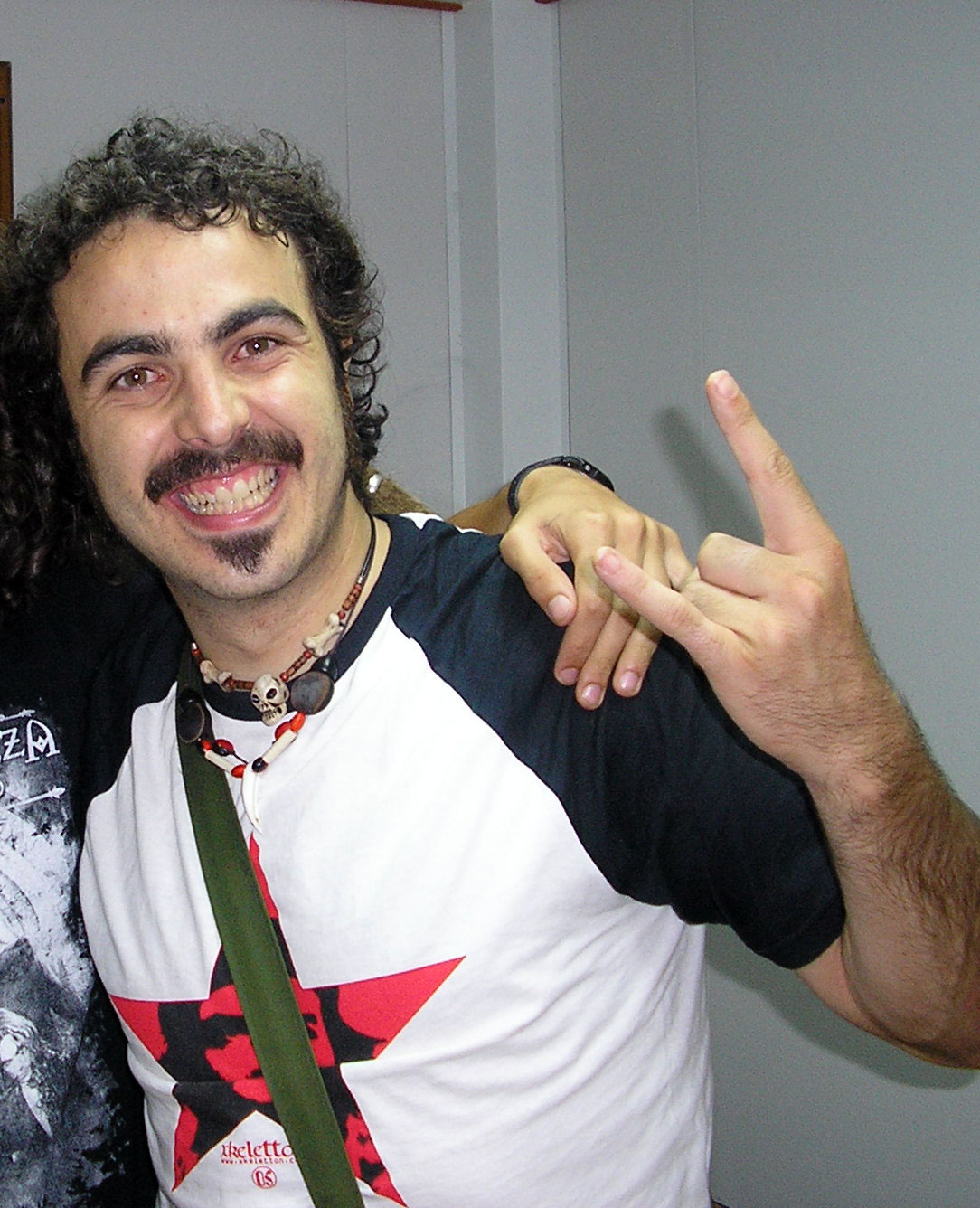
Huecco, while singing for Sugarless.

Iván Sevillano Pérez (Plasencia, 1974), alias Huecco, is a Spanish singer. He grew up in Madrid (Aluche) and Leganés. He did Media Studies, was an ice skater and one of the members of the rock band Sugarless before becoming a celebrity thanks to his single Pa' mi guerrera in 2006.

He made the videoclip Se acabaron las lágrimas with the support of the Minister for Equality.

Huecco has an organization called Fundación Dame Vida that works to distribute Soccket footballs, which have generators inside them to produce electricity when kicked, to energy-impoverished areas. The royalties from the sales of his album Dame Vida will be donated to that cause.

== Discography ==
=== With Sugarless ===
- Asegúramelo (Mans Records, 1998)
- Más Gas (Zero Records, 2002)
- Vértigo (Zero Records, 2003)

=== Solo albums ===
- Huecco, 2006
- Assalto, 2008
- Dame Vida, 2011
