= Calendly =

Calendar scheduling software

- Type: Private
- Industry: Software
- Founded: 2013
- Founder: Tope Awotona
- Headquarters: Remote
- Key people: Tope Awotona (CEO)
- Products: Meeting scheduling software
- Number of employees: 424 (April 2022)
- Website: calendly.com

Calendly is a software company that develops a business communication platform used for teams to schedule, prepare and follow up on external meetings. The company was founded in Atlanta, Georgia by Nigerian-born American entrepreneur Tope Awotona, but discontinued its physical offices in July 2021.

As of January 2021, Calendly was valued at $3 billion, making it a tech unicorn.

== History ==
Calendly was founded in Atlanta in 2013 by Tope Awotona, a former EMC (now Dell EMC) salesperson who was frustrated with the difficulty of scheduling sales calls. He founded the company with his savings and by taking out a small-business loan while working at the co-working incubator Atlanta Tech Village. He hired the Kyiv, Ukraine-based company Railsware to help develop the software. In late 2013, seed investors provided a $550,000 investment.

The software began as a freemium version for individual users when the company launched. In late 2014, the company added a premium version.

In January 2021, Calendly raised $350 million from investment firms OpenView Venture Partners and Iconiq, at a reported $3 billion valuation. In July 2021, during the COVID-19 outbreak, Awotona closed the company's Atlanta headquarters and took the company remote.

In January 2022, the company received attention on Twitter when a Silicon Valley entrepreneur criticized the etiquette behind sending a Calendly link, and others defended the process. The company reported a large spike in sign-ups after the social media attention. In a February article about Google's calendar application, Wired reported that Calendly was a market leader.

== Products ==
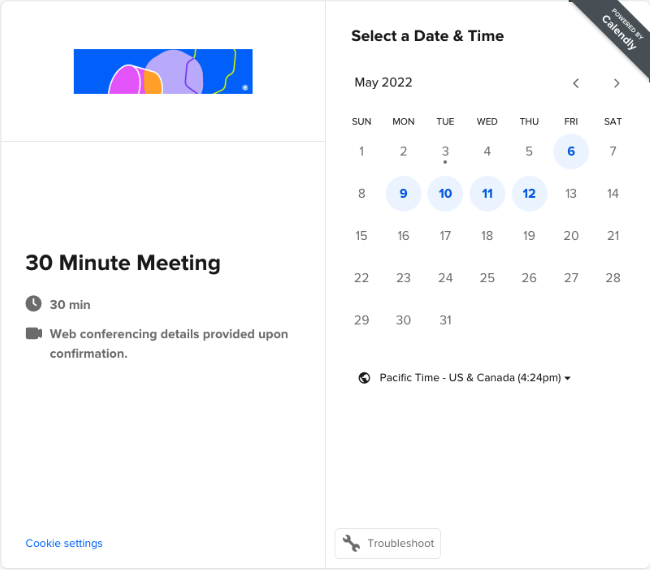
Screen shot showing Calendly's scheduling interface

Calendly develops a software as a service scheduling automation platform to help schedule external meetings and make them more productive. Users share open time slots in their calendars to book meetings by sending a scheduling link, or through embedded times in an email or text message. Recipients of Calendly invitations select an available time before it is automatically added to Google and Microsoft Outlook calendars.

The company offers a freemium version for individuals, and premium versions for individuals, teams and enterprises. The premium version offers additional features such as additional calendars, team scheduling features and integration with video conferencing and payment services.

The software has been recognized for its viral nature, since recipients of invites could be encouraged to try the software themselves.

== Operations ==
Calendly was founded in Atlanta, but as of July 2021, operates an all-remote workforce without an official headquarters. Tope Awotona is the company's CEO. The company reported 424 employees in April 2022. As of January 2021, the company was valued at $3 billion. In August of 2026, Calendly launched additional AI-based features to their tools, including an AI note-taker, marking their entrance into the note-taking space. It was also announced that Calendly is planning to release an AI Assistant for meeting scheduling.
