= Tope Awotona =

Nigerian businessman (born 1981)

Tope Awotona CON
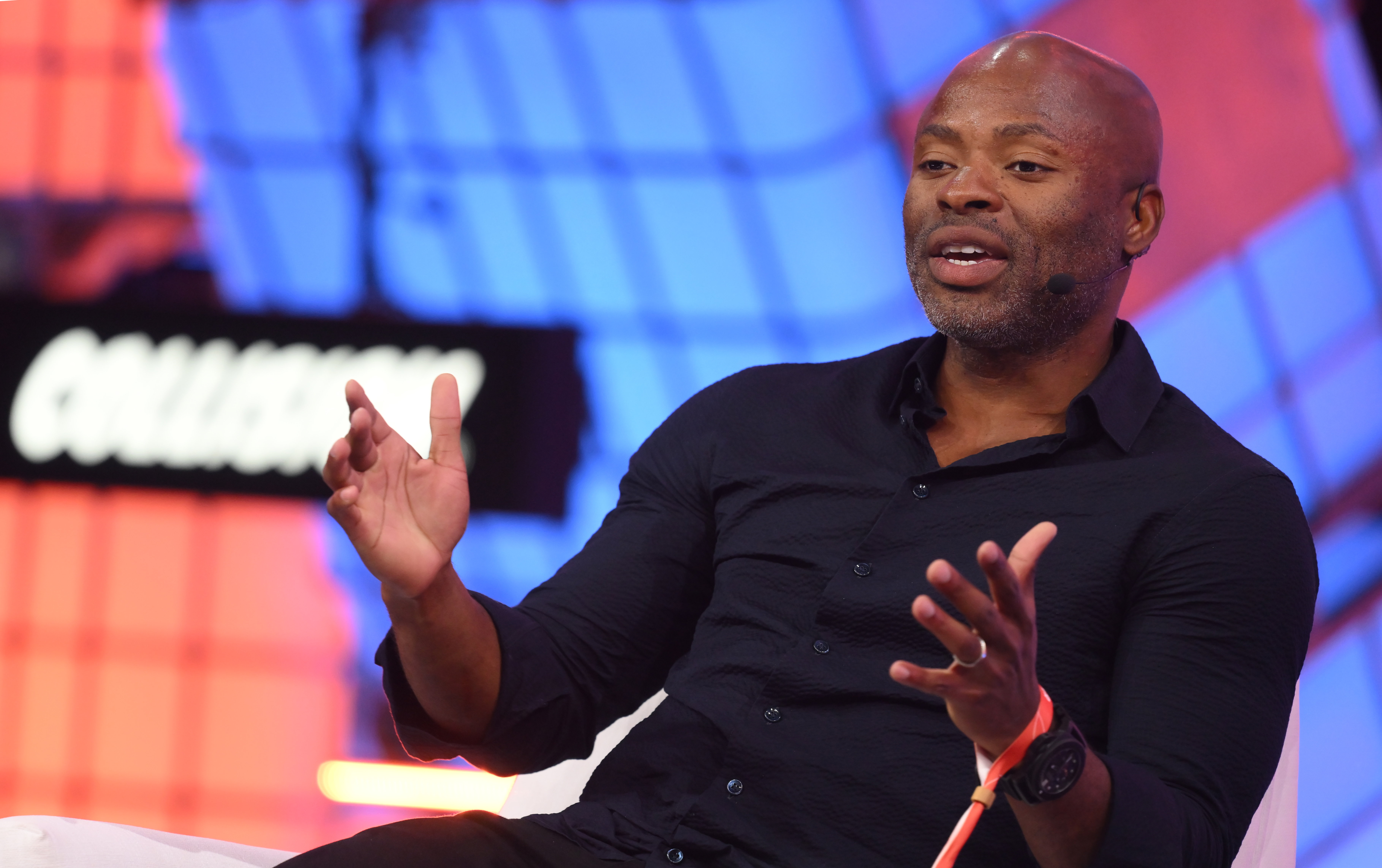
- Tope Awotona
- Born: Tope Awotona; 4 May 1981 (age 45); Lagos, Nigeria
- Education: University of Georgia (BBA)
- Occupations: Software developer; entrepreneur
- Title: Founder, Chairman & CEO of Calendly
- Spouse: Married

Tope Awotona is a Nigerian–American tech entrepreneur known for founding the software company, Calendly. As of 2025, Forbes estimates his net worth at $1.4 Billion making him one of the richest Black Billionaires.

== Early life and education ==
Awotona was born in Lagos, Nigeria. His father was a microbiologist and entrepreneur; his mother worked at the local bank. When Awotona was 12 years old, his father was killed in a carjacking, convincing his mother, with Awotona and his three brothers, to later leave Lagos, migrate to the US, and reside in the Atlanta, Georgia, area. Although he graduated from high school two years early and was provided a scholarship to a US college at 15 years old, his mother decided he was too young and required Awotona to first attend Wheeler High School for its junior and senior years. Awotona said, "It was super frustrating. I felt like I was wasting time because I had my plan in place." Nevertheless, the two years helped him to assimilate and learn the culture while he planned to continue his father's legacy of entrepreneurship. He attended the University of Georgia, initially majoring in Computer Science, he later changed to Business Management Information Systems and graduated from Georgia's Terry College of Business with a Bachelor of Business Administration degree in 2002. His ethnicity is Yoruba.

== Career ==
Following graduation from the University of Georgia, Awotona held different corporate jobs, including working for IBM, before joining a startup company, Perceptive Software, as an accountant executive. There he was exposed to the functions of a software business. While trying to schedule a meeting, Awotona became frustrated and decided to use his life savings and go into debt to create a communication and scheduling software company that became Calendly. Launched from Atlanta Tech Village, Calendly made its debut in 2013. Calendly became a $3 billion software firm that continues to provide solutions for business communications, team scheduling, and preparation follow-ups. As of 2024, the Calendly app has 10 million users, forcing Forbes to make Awotona one of the wealthiest immigrants in America.

On 4 March 2025, Awotona was announced as the sole inductee into the Technology Association of Georgia's 2024 Technology Hall of Fame. The association recognized his contributions to the technology industry, including his role in building successful technology companies, creating jobs, fostering innovation, and supporting economic growth in Georgia.

On 4 July 2025, Awotona was named a recipient of the Carnegie Corporation of New York's Great Immigrants Award, recognizing him as a naturalized U.S. citizen who has made significant contributions to American society, democracy, and culture.
