= Silas Adekunle =

Nigerian-British inventor and technology entrepreneur (born 1991)

- Born: c. July 1991 (age 35); Ibadan, Nigeria
- Citizenship: Nigeria
- Education: University of the West of England
- Occupations: Inventor, Robotics engineer
- Known for: Co-founder and former CEO, Reach Robotics

Silas Adekunle is a Nigerian-British inventor and technology entrepreneur known for creating the world's first intelligent gaming robot. In 2025, he made history as the world's highest-paid robotic engineer. Nigerian-born Silas Adekunle, who moved to the United Kingdom at the age of 12, developed MekaMon, an innovative gaming robot that was later sold through stores.

== Early life and education ==
Adekunle was born in Ibadan, Oyo State, Nigeria and moved to the UK when he was 12. He earned a first class degree in robotics and an Honorary Degree of Doctor of Technology from the University of the West of England, Bristol. In an interview with Punch Nigeria, Adekunle said that Africa can compete globally through science and technology.

== Career ==
Adekunle co-founded and was the CEO of Reach Robotics, a UK-based augmented reality gaming company that created robots for gaming and STEM education. The startup developed a 4-legged robot with lifelike movement called MekaMon. The system animated video game by combining robotics with augmented reality. Reach Robotics also developed an app, which controlled the MekaMon and acted as a portal to digital content. Adekunle received $12 million from investors, including London Venture Partners, allowing the company to expand to about 65 full-time employees at its peak.

In 2018, Adekunle partnered with Apple, signing an exclusive distribution deal to sell his product in both the United States and Britain. Reach Robotics shut down on 2 September 2019 owing to "inherent challenges in the consumer robotics sector". Blueprint Lab, a robot manufacturing company adopts the name 'Reach Robotics' in July 2022.

Adekunle is now focused on using MekaMon to develop the Robotics education ecosystem across Africa and cloud infrastructure for industrial automation in the UK. He founded the company Awarri, which aims to enable the development and adaptation of advanced AI and robotics technology in Africa. As so January 2020, Adekunle is also the co-founder and CEO of (R.I). The company aims to help developers to quickly and securely implement the cloud infrastructure needed to remotely monitor, manage and control their robots, industrial automation and IOT devices. The company's flagship innovation was MekaMon, a four-legged robotic creature designed with realistic, lifelike movements. More than just a toy, MekaMon blended robotics and augmented reality to transform digital gaming into an interactive real-world experience. Reach Robotics also developed a companion mobile app that enabled users to control MekaMon while unlocking additional gaming features and digital.

== Honours ==
In November 2018, Adekunle was named to the Financial Times' list of the "Top 100 minority ethnic leaders in technology". In the same year, he was selected for the Forbes 30 Under 30 Europe 2018: Technology list.

== See also ==
- Ndubuisi Ekekwe
