= Victoria Chibuogu Nneji =

Nigerian American robotics research scientist

- Born: Lagos, Nigeria
- Education: North Carolina School of Science and Mathematics
- Alma mater: Columbia University; Duke University
- Occupations: Computer scientist, software engineer, and lecturer
- Known for: design and innovation strategy, robotics, autonomous transportation

Victoria Chibuogu Nneji (born in Eko) is a Nigerian-born American computer scientist, design and innovation strategist, and a lecturing fellow, known for her research on robotics, automation, human-centered design, and autonomous transportation.

== Biography ==
Victoria Chibuogu Nneji was born in Eko, Nigeria; at age 5 she and her family immigrated to the United States and was raised in Durham, North Carolina. Nneji attended the North Carolina School of Science and Mathematics (NCSSM) starting her junior year of high school.

She has a bachelor’s degree in applied mathematics from Columbia University, being one of the first in her family to pursue post-secondary education, and studying under Adam Sobel. Here, she performed a quantitative analysis on how changes in financial aid would impact a student's performance and the duration of their completion of an associate's degree. Nneji herself had an Anita Borg scholarship to support her attendance to Columbia University. While attending Columbia University, she served as a consultant for the Northern Manhattan Improvement Corporation (NMIC) in Washington Heights, and conducted user research in order to make improvements to EcoMundo, the women's domestic violence recovery group within the NMIC.

Nneji received a master’s degree in engineering management from Duke University and a PhD in 2019 in Mechanical Engineering from the Robotics Center at Duke University. Post-graduation she has served as a robotics lecturing fellow at Duke University.

The research paper, Exploring Concepts of Operations for On-Demand Passenger Air Transportation (2017), by co-authors Nneji, Alexander Stimpson, and Mary Cummings from Duke University, and Kenneth H. Goodrich, from NASA Langley Research Center determined that the technology in order to create "on-demand passenger air travel" and related regulatory framework will take more than a decade to create.

Nneji has also done research on human-robot interaction. The research paper, Tell Me More: Designing HRI to Encourage More Trust, Disclosure, and Companionship (2016), by co-authors Nikolas Martelaro, Wendy Ju, and Pamela Hinds, found that vulnerability and expressivity may improve peoples' relationships with robots. In this study, Nneji and her team engaged high school students with robots with low/high vulnerability and low/high expressivity in a learning activity. They found that students were more trusting of vulnerable robots and more communicative with expressive robots.

In 2019, Nneji was appointed to Uber's self-driving safety and responsibility advisory (SARA), alongside five others, in order to review, advise, and suggesting changes to Uber's autonomous vehicle development.

== See also ==
- List of Nigerian Americans
- African-American women in computer science
