= The Real Housewives of Potomac season 8 =

The Real Housewives of Potomac
- Season 8
- Promotional poster via Peacock
- Starring: Gizelle Bryant; Ashley Darby; Robyn Dixon; Karen Huger; Candiace Dillard Bassett; Wendy Osefo; Mia Thornton; Nneka Ihim
- No. of episodes: 21

Release
- Original network: Bravo
- Original release: November 5, 2023 – April 14, 2024

Season chronology
- ← Previous; Season 7 Next → Season 9

The eighth season of The Real Housewives of Potomac, an American reality television series, was broadcast on Bravo. It premiered on November 5, 2023, and was primarily filmed in Potomac, Maryland. The executive producers are Steven Weinstock, Glenda Hersh, Lauren Eskelin, Lorraine Haughton-Lawson, Nora Devin, Eric Fuller, and Andy Cohen.

The season focuses on the personal and professional lives of Gizelle Bryant, Ashley Darby, Robyn Dixon, Karen Huger, Candiace Dillard Bassett, Wendy Osefo, Mia Thornton and Nneka Ihim, with Charrisse Jackson-Jordan and Keiarna Stewart appearing as friends of the housewives.

This season marked the final appearance of Candiace Dillard Bassett and the only appearance of Nneka Ihim, as well as the final regular appearance of Robyn Dixon.

== Cast ==
In September 2023, it was announced that the eighth season of the series would premiere on November 5, 2023, with all seven housewives from the seventh season returning and Nneka Ihim joining as the newest housewife. Former housewife Charrisse Jackson-Jordan and new cast member Keiarna Stewart appear as friends of the housewives.

== Production ==
Filming for the eighth season began in April 2023 and concluded in July 2023. The Real Housewives of Potomac is produced by Truly Original for Bravo. Steven Weinstock, Glenda Hersh, Lauren Eskelin, Lorraine Haughton-Lawson, Nora Devin, Eric Fuller, and Andy Cohen are recognized as the series' executive producers. Jackie Hebert, Nick Prescott, and Lizzie Spratt serve as co-executive producers.

== Episodes ==
The Real Housewives of Potomac season 8 episodes
No. overall	No. in season	Title	Original release date	US viewers (millions)
132	1	"Projections and Deflections"	November 5, 2023	0.79
133	2	"Home Sweet Drama"	November 12, 2023	0.76
134	3	"Heaven Is a Place in Potomac"	November 19, 2023	0.73
135	4	"In a Pickle"	November 26, 2023	0.71
136	5	"Pie in the Austin Sky"	December 3, 2023	0.80
137	6	"Tequila, Tears, Texas"	December 10, 2023	0.66
The trip to Austin has a lot of drama going on particularly for Robyn who is starting to reach her breaking point. Some of the ladies go to a tequila tasting while others go boot shopping. The tequila group talk about Nneka and her accusations against Wendy's mom. Wendy starts breaking down with the other ladies, Karen, Candiace and Mia comforting her. At a group dinner, the topic of Michael's lawsuit is brought up and Candiace doesn't want to talk about, making Robyn upset as to what can be talked about. Candiace and Robyn feud continuing on their way to Chicken Bingo place.
138	7	"Don't Rock the Boat"	December 17, 2023	0.72
The ladies go to a Chicken place to play some Bingo but with a twist. Robyn is upset after a confrontation with Candiace in the car over Juan. Gizelle and Karen talk about how fractured the group is, and the ladies go on boats together much to Karen's distaste of doing so.
139	8	"Painting Austin Red"	January 7, 2024	0.68
The ladies trip to Austin continues as the ladies celebrate Karen's triple twenty. The ladies each paint a picture of Karen or something that reminds them of Karen was interesting results. When the ladies sit down for a dinner, Candiace and Ashley go toe to toe and Ashley wonders why Candiace has treated Robyn the way she has, leading to Candiace and Robyn to start fighting. Robyn breaks down and calls Juan who also reprimands her. The ladies final stop is to a Drag Show where some of the ladies give their fabulous looks and walks but one Housewife isn't feeling it.
140	9	"Hard Conversations"	January 14, 2024	0.68
Karen has an event for her charity and the ladies have some tough conversations about SA. This leads Mia to leave the room after her own experience and further explains her distance from Jacqueline.
141	10	"Friendship Is a Mother"	January 21, 2024	0.78
Candiace invites the ladies to a mother's day lunch, well all except Gizelle. Robyn doesn't attend as she still feels she needs to talk to Candiace while Wendy cannot make it due to an event she was doing but most think it has to do with Nneka being there and not wanting issues between her and Wendy's mom. Candiace and Robyn finally have a sit down and hash out some issues but still cannot get over the hurdle.
142	11	"First Come, First Served"	January 28, 2024	0.64
143	12	"Blazed and Confused"	February 4, 2024	0.61
144	13	"Sharing Is Caring"	February 18, 2024	0.67
145	14	"Sun's Out Buns Out"	February 25, 2024	0.64
146	15	"Fool's Gold"	March 3, 2024	0.65
147	16	"Boiling Point"	March 10, 2024	0.59
Gizelle sends Grace off to college with a very sad good bye from her & Gizelle doesn't know how to handle it. Robyn has Ashley & Charrisse over & they discuss the end of the DR trip. Charrisse says she will be having a Crab Boil & will invite all the ladies, (including Karen) & Mia's former bestie Jacqueline. Karen tells Gizelle she won't be attending. As the day is here Mia and Jacqueline talk through their differences while a spat between Robyn & Candiace leads someone having a huge breakdown.
148	17	"Fashion Show-Down"	March 17, 2024	0.61
Ashley & Gizelle are gearing up for their fashion show for their collaborative athleisure wear GNA. Mia & G go to therapy to discuss their marriage troubles, while Candiace has her own therapy dealing with her own issues of future motherhood. Robyn is looking at a space for her new facial care place & Mia has the ladies do a photoshoot minus one housewife. The GNA fashion show is here and the ladies all attend, including a few former faces. As everyone seemed to be having a good time, a conversation with Candiace & a friend of Ashley's could make things go south.
149	18	"An Iconic Ending"	March 24, 2024	0.71
150	19	"Reunion Part 1"	March 31, 2024	0.72
151	20	"Reunion Part 2"	April 7, 2024	0.82
152	21	"Reunion Part 3"	April 14, 2024	0.79
