= Ope Amosu =

Ope Amosu is a Nigerian-American chef. He is the owner of the James Beard-nominated restaurant ChòpnBlọk. The James Beard Foundation named him a Semifinalist in the Emerging Chef (2024) and Best Chef: Texas (2025) categories.

== Early life and education ==
Ope Amosu was born in London and lived in Nigeria with his grandparents before moving to Houston. Amosu graduated from Rice University’s business school. Prior to opening his restaurant, Amosu worked in the energy industry. Local cooks taught him heritage recipes and he used knowledge gained by working as a prep cook at Chipotle to learn more fast casual concepts.

== Career ==
ChòpnBlọk started as a series of pop-up events in 2018 before opening its first location at the POST Houston food hall in 2021. In 2022, Amosu was a guest judge for Top Chef: Houston. ChòpnBlọk opened its first standalone location in Houston's Montrose neighborhood on Nigerian Independence Day in 2024.
