= Nneka Egbujiobi =

American lawyer (born 1987)

Nneka Ihim
- Born: Nneka Colleen Egbujiobi // September 12, 1987 (age 38); Boston, Massachusetts, U.S.
- Education: University of Michigan (BA); University of Wisconsin Law School (JD)
- Occupation: Lawyer
- Spouse: Ikenna Ihim (m. 2021)
- Children: 1

Nneka Colleen Ihim (née Egbujiobi; born September 12, 1987 (Note: Ihim's birthday is September 12. She was 36 years old on May 13, 2024. Her full birthdate, September 12, 1987, is calculated from these two facts.)) is an American lawyer, and the founder and CEO of Hello Africa. She was a main cast member on The Real Housewives of Potomac for its eighth season.

== Early life and career ==
Egbujiobi was born in Boston, Massachusetts to Igbo parents Leo and Bridget Egbujiobi and raised in Beloit, Wisconsin. Her father Leo is an interventional cardiologist and philanthropist. Her parents immigrated from Okija, Ihiala, Anambra State, Nigeria to the United States in 1979.

Egbujiobi graduated from University of Michigan with a degree in English language and literature, before receiving a Juris Doctor from University of Wisconsin Law School in 2012. She became an attorney, practicing in Pasadena, California.

During her time in University of Michigan, she was a university correspondent for CNN. She created the online dating platform Hello Africa after briefly practicing law. Egbujiobi has worked as a correspondent for Beloit Daily News and was an extern for Judy Robson during Robson's tenure as Wisconsin State Senate majority leader. Her application, Hello Africa won Best Indigenous Mobile Application of the Year at the Africa Royalty Awards.

In September 2023, Egbujiobi was announced as a cast member of the eighth season of the Bravo reality television series The Real Housewives of Potomac, becoming the second cast member of Nigerian and Igbo heritage after Wendy Osefo who joined in season five. In May 2024, Ihim announced that she would not be returning to the series for a second season.

== Personal life ==
In 2021, Egbujiobi married Ikenna Ihim. On January 22, 2025, the couple announced that they were expecting their first child, stating they were originally expecting twins but lost one embryo in utero. On May 14, 2025, Ihim gave birth to son Noah.
