= Opeoluwa Sotonwa =

Nigerian lawyer

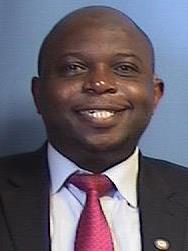
Opeoluwa Sotonwa

Opeoluwa Sotonwa (born in Ijebu-Ode) is a Deaf Nigerian American attorney, disability rights advocate and literary writer. In February 2021, Governor Charles Baker appointed Sotonwa as the Commissioner and agency head for the Massachusetts Commission for the Deaf and Hard of Hearing. Prior to his appointment as Commissioner, he was the executive director of Missouri Commission for the Deaf and Hard of Hearing. and served previously as Vice President of the National Black Deaf Advocates, the official advocacy organization for thousands of Black Deaf and Hard of Hearing Americans between 2013 and 2015. He is listed among the most influential Deaf People in the United States Opeoluwa Sotonwa attended University of Ilorin Nigeria, where he read law and graduated with LLB degree in 2005. He later proceeded to Nigerian Law School for advanced legal training. He was called to the Nigerian Bar as a Barrister and Solicitor of the Supreme Court of Nigeria in 2007. Opeoluwa worked as staff attorney with Nigerian Legal Aid Council. He later moved to United States to further his legal career and attended Howard University School of Law, where he graduated cum laude with a Master of Laws degree in 2009. Sotonwa earned his doctorate in Law and Policy from Northeastern University's College of Professional Studies in 2018.

Sotonwa is the author of The Victim of The Silent Void, published in The Deaf Way II Anthology by Gallaudet University Press and has been featured prominently in the media.
