= Esiaba Irobi =

Nigerian poet and playwright (1960–2010)

Esiaba Irobi (1960–2010) was a Nigerian poet, playwright, actor and academic.

== Biography ==
Irobi was born on 10 January 1960. He held a Bachelor of Arts in English/Drama and a Master of Arts in Comparative Literature from the University of Nigeria, Nsukka, a Master of Arts in Film and Theatre from the University of Sheffield, Sheffield UK and a PhD in Theatre Studies from the University of Leeds, UK. He taught at Liverpool John Moores University in England and the Tisch School of the Arts, of New York University, and was associate professor of International Theatre and Film Studies at Ohio University, Athens, USA.

He died in Berlin on 3 May 2010.

== Bibliography ==
- Hangmen Also Die
- Nwokedi
- Cemetery Road
