= Ikenna Ihim =

Nigerian-American doctor and philanthropist

- Born: 27 October 1984 (age 41); Owerri, Imo State, Nigeria
- Education: University of Maryland, College Park (BS); St. Matthew's University (MD); Davenport University (MBA)
- Occupations: Doctor; philanthropist
- Spouse: Nneka Egbujiobi (m. 2021)
- Children: 1

Ikenna Ihim // (born 27 October 1984), is a Nigerian-American doctor and philanthropist best known for his work on nasogastric intubation. Since 2020, he has been working on the frontline of the COVID-19 pandemic.

== Education and career ==
Ihim graduated from University of Maryland, College Park with a degree in biology, before proceeding to St. Matthew's University where he studied medicine and graduated in 2014. From 2015 to 2018, he went to Coney Island Hospital for his residency in internal medicine. He later got his medical license in North Carolina and became a board certified internist and started practicing in Fayetteville, North Carolina. During his time in the medical school, he furthered to Davenport University where he got an MBA in healthcare management, graduating in 2017.

== Awards and recognition ==
Ihim received a chieftaincy title as Nze Ikeoha 1 of Nkwerre.

== Personal life ==
Ihim was born in Owerri, Imo State, Nigeria. He is from Amorji-Ugwu, Nkwerre, Imo State. His father is Nze O.F.N. Ihim, a business tycoon and a former governorship candidate in Imo State. His mother is Daisy Ihim.

In 2021, Ihim married Nneka Egbujiobi. On January 22, 2025, the couple announced that they were expecting their first child, stating they were originally expecting twins but lost one embryo in utero. On May 14, 2025, the couple welcomed son Noah.
