= Charles Uwadia =

Nigerian academic

- Born: Charles Uwadia
- Citizenship: Nigerian
- Education: Computer Science at University of Lagos

Charles Uwadia is a professor at the department of Computer Sciences, University of Lagos. He is the president and chairman in council of the Computer Professionals Registration Council of Nigeria.

== Education ==
Uwadia earned his Bachelor of Science degree in Computer Science at the University of Ibadan in 1979, and obtained his Master of Science in 1983, and a Doctor of Philosophy in Computer Science from the University of Lagos in 1990.

== Career ==
He served as the acting head of department in the University of Lagos 1996 - 1998, and followed as the acting director Computer centre 2003 - 2005.

He is a member of the Association for Computing Machinery (ACM) and the Institute of Electrical and Electronics Engineers (IEEE), and a Fellow of the Nigeria Computer Society (NCS). He has held several leadership roles within Nigeria’s information technology sector, including serving as President of the Nigeria Computer Society from 2007 to 2011, and as President and Chairman-in-Council of the Computer Professionals Registration Council of Nigeria (CPN) from 2017 to the present. He also serves as the Chair of the Eko-Konnect Research and Education Initiative.
