= Tomiwa Aladekomo =

Nigerian media executive and politician

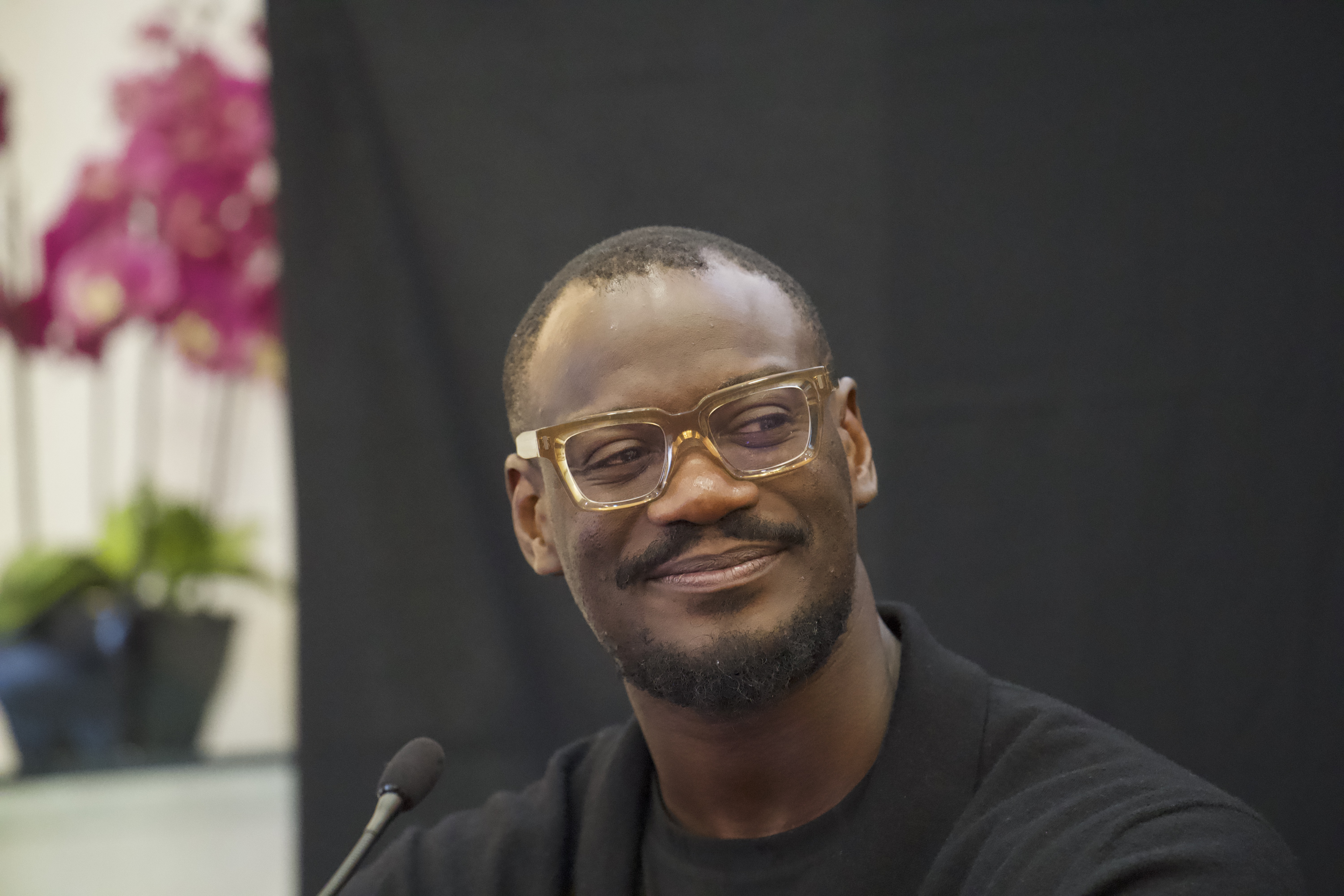
- Born: Adetomiwa Adebowale Aladekomo; 2 January 1982; Osogbo, Osun State, Nigeria
- Education: Boston University; Columbia University New York
- Occupation: Media proprietor
- Years active: 2004–present
- Known for: Media ownership; politics
- Title: Acting national chair
- Term: 2020–2023
- Political party: Youth Party Nigeria
- Board member of: Chams PLC
- Parents: Sir Demola Aladekomo (father); Titi Aladekomo (mother)

Tomiwa Aladekomo (born 2 January 1982) is a Nigerian media executive, internet entrepreneur and politician. He is the chief executive officer of Big Cabal Media, which publishes Zikoko, a youth-focused internet publication, and TechCabal, an African technology media platform.

He was the acting National Chair of the Nigerian political party, Youth Party (YP) between 2020 and 2022. He is also a Director at Smartcity PLC, as well as an experienced media and marketing professional.

== Early life and education ==
Aladekomo was born on 2 January 1982, in Osun State, Nigeria. He is the son of the Nigerian computer engineer Demola Aladekomo and Titi Aladekomo. He grew up between Ilesha and Lagos, where he learned to speak Yoruba before learning English.

In 2000, he trained in Business Management & Finance at the Boston University, Massachusetts in the United States of America, receiving his degree in 2004. He attended Columbia University, also in the United States, obtaining a Master's degree in Anthropology in 2007.

== Career ==
Tomiwa Aladekomo founded Quirk, a concert and event company in 2009, producing events like Lagos Jazz Festival, Music Meets Runway and Fela in Lagos and concerts for artists like Asa, Nneka and Keziah Jones. Aladekomo worked at Atlantic Records and on album designs for artists such as Lupe Fiasco and T.I.

In 2011, he joined the Nigerian Breweries, managing the company's alcoholic and nonalcoholic beverages like Star, Gulder, Heineken and Maltina. He then joined Ventra Media Group in 2016 where he was later named managing director.

Aladekomo became CEO of Big Cabal Media in 2018 after the exit of founding CEO Seyi Taylor. He led the company to a fundraising round of $2.3m in 2022.

He is also a non-executive director at Chams PLC, a technology company listed on the Nigerian Stock Exchange. He host Tech into future on Arise new where he used to speak to millions of people around Africa about what is happening in the Tech Industry.

== Politics ==
Tomiwa Aladekomo was appointed Acting National Chair of the Nigerian political party, Youth Party (YP), in October 2020.

== Fellowships and recognition ==
Aladekomo received an Archbishop Tutu Leadership Fellowship from the African Leadership Institute in 2013. He also made the YNaija Power List for Corporate Nigeria in 2017.

== Personal life ==
Aladekomo is married to Lisa Leigh.
