= Lazarus Angbazo =

Nigerian-American industrialist (born 1962)

- Born: 1962 (age 63–64); Keffi, Nasarawa State, Nigeria
- Education: Ahmadu Bello University (B.Sc. Mathematics); University of California, Berkeley (M.Sc. Industrial Engineering & Operations Research); Columbia University (Ph.D. Finance & Economics)
- Occupation: Business executive
- Employer: InfraCorp Nigeria
- Known for: Former President & CEO of General Electric Nigeria; CEO of GE Grid Solutions Africa

Dr. Lazarus Angbazo (born 1962) is a Nigerian-American industrialist and business leader. Appointed in 2021, He is the managing director and chief executive officer of the Infrastructure Corporation of Nigeria (InfraCorp Nigeria). He was the president and chief executive officer of General Electric in Nigeria. He was also the CEO of General Electric Grid Solutions Africa. Before assuming his role in Nigeria, where he has doubled the GE revenue in the country by over $1 billion, he led GE's regional operations between 2008 and 2012 as president and CEO, West, East & Central Africa. He is also the president of the American Business Council in Nigeria. He is also the president of GE Energy Connection Africa.

== Early life and education ==
Lazarus Angbazo was born in Keffi, Nasarawa State of Nigeria into the royal family of Angbazo. He is a native of Eggon, from Awayi community of Wakama Development area of Nassarawa Eggon, Nasarawa State, Nigeria. His father, His Royal Highness late (Dr.) Bala A. Angbazo, was the Aren Eggon, the traditional ruler of the Eggon people, and his mother, Mrs. Polina Angbazo, was the queen.

He attended Government College Keffi. He obtained his bachelor's degree from the Ahmadu Bello University Zaria with a First Class Honors Degree in Mathematics in 1982. From there, he studied Industrial Engineering and Operations Research for his master's degree at the University of Iowa before taking a PhD in Corporate Finance at the New York University.

== Career ==
Infrastructure Corporation of Nigeria (InfraCorp Nigeria)

In 2021, Angbazo was appointed the founding Managing Director and chief executive officer of the Infrastructure Corporation of Nigeria (InfraCorp), a government-backed infrastructure investment platform established by the Central Bank of Nigeria (CBN), the Africa Finance Corporation (AFC), and the Nigeria Sovereign Investment Authority (NSIA). Under his leadership, InfraCorp was structured to mobilize up to ₦15 trillion in blended capital from institutional and private investors to close Nigeria’s estimated ₦35 trillion infrastructure gap.

At InfraCorp, Angbazo oversees the development and financing of critical national infrastructure projects across power, transport, logistics, and industrial sectors. He has been instrumental in setting up the organization’s governance framework, engaging asset managers, and launching the first wave of strategic infrastructure initiatives.

=== General Electric ===
Angbazo joined GE from JP Morgan Chase & Co in 2004 where he was the vice president, Corporate Treasury and Development. He started off as the Managing Director and Chief Marketing Officer of GE Commercial & Industrial Finance. He became the MD, Industry Client Coverage Team at GE Capital in 2006 before he was redeployed to head the West, East and Central Africa operations as the pioneer GE executive in the region. In 2012, Angbazo became the Chief Executive of GE business operations in Nigeria where he doubled revenues to over $1 billion. He was responsible for facilitating GE investment of $1 billion for the creation of a multi-modal manufacturing and service hub for Africa including a service plant for power turbines in Calabar, Cross River state.

==== Rail concession ====
General Electric signed an interim concession agreement with the Federal Government of Nigeria for the operation of Nigeria's narrow-gauge railway system. The consortium deal which was led by GE Nigeria CEO, Angbazo was worth $45million for the interim jphase of the project and $2.9billion for the entire phase of the project.

==== Employment ====
Angbazo increased GE employment in Nigeria from about 200 to 500 employees within three years, with about ninety percent of Nigerian National employees occupying eighty percent of leadership positions in the organisation. General Electric Nigeria was also ranked by job matching portal, Jobberman as the best Nigerian company to work for in 2016.

=== Academic and public sector ===
Angbazo was an Assistant Professor of Finance at the Purdue University, Indiana between September 1992 to May 1997. During this time, he took a sabbatical leave for one year and joined the Fannie Mae, as Director-Housing Finance Research from 1995 to 1996. He has authored several research articles in corporate finance and capital markets published in Journal of Fixed Income, Journal of Banking and Finance, European Finance Review, Journal of Risk and Insurance, and Management Science Journal. He is a speaker at the Krannert Executive Forum at Krannert School of Management, Purdue University.

==== Board memberships ====
Angbazo currently sits on the boards of several universities and business schools in Nigeria including the Lagos Business School of the Pan-Atlantic University, the Africa-America Institute and Bingham University.

=== Presidential appointment ===
Angbazo was appointed as a member of the Nigeria Industrial Policy and Competitiveness Advisory Council inaugurated by the chairman, Nigeria's Vice President Professor Yemi Osinbajo. Other businessmen on the council include Africa's richest man, Aliko Dangote who is its vice-chair. The council is expected to spearhead Nigeria's industrial agenda to raise the contribution of manufacturing to the country's Gross Domestic Product (GDP).

== Personal life ==
He is married to Joyce Lin and they have two children; Saraya, a daughter and Jonathan, a son. They live in Abuja. He is the brother to Major Gen. Nuhu Bala Angbazo (Nigerian Army) and Dr. James Angbazo the (Dan Galadima Eggon).
