= Elechukwu Njaka =

Nigerian political scientist (1921–1975)

Mazi Elechukwu Nnadibuagha Njaka
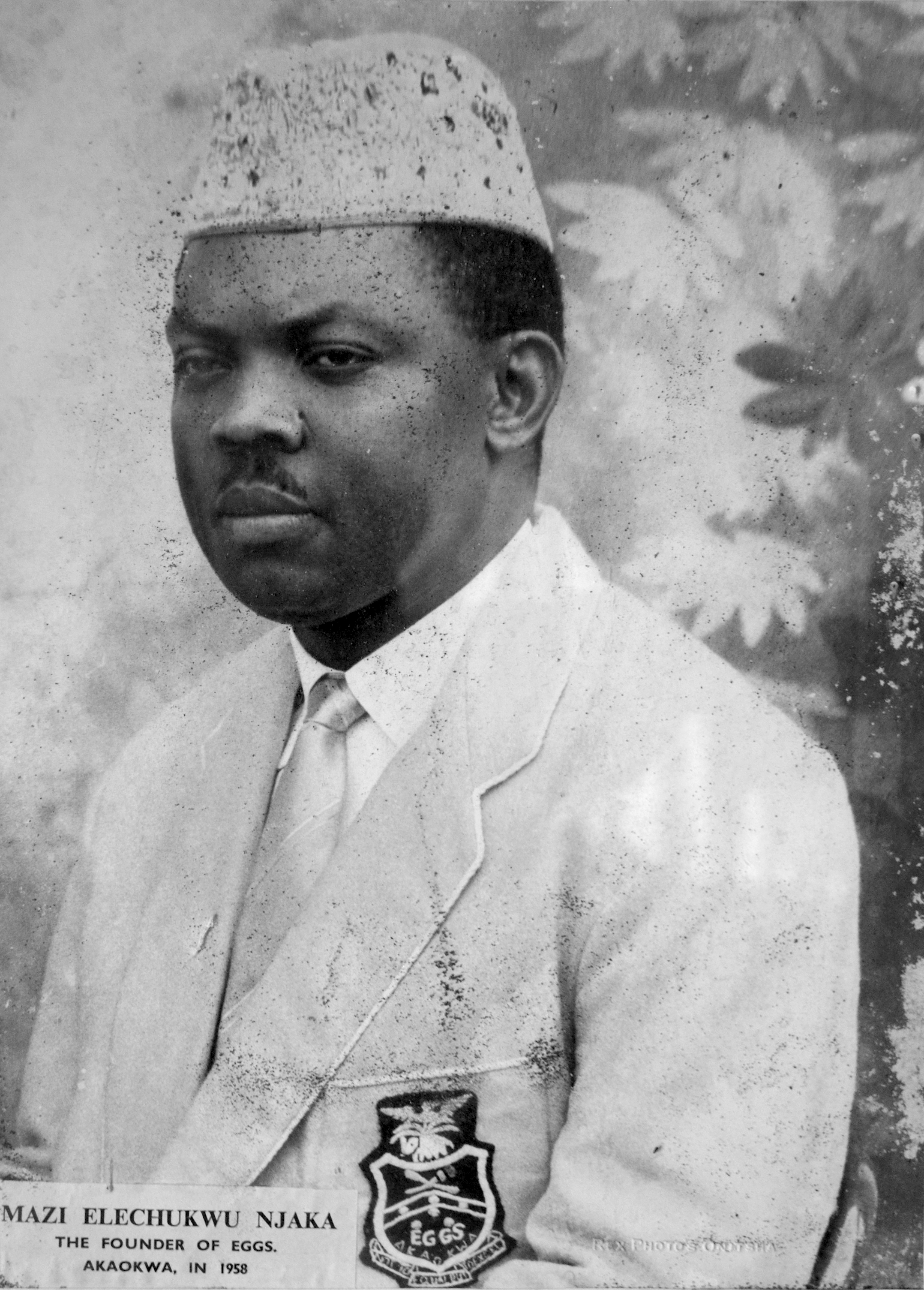
- Born: 23 June 1921; Akokwa, Nigeria
- Died: 14 January 1975 (aged 53)
- Resting place: Akokwa, Nigeria
- Education: Xavier University; University of California, Los Angeles
- Known for: Igbo Political Culture
- Spouse(s): Ulunwa Rose Ọji & Felicia Omanu
- Scientific career
- Fields: Political Science
- Workplaces: Tuskegee Institute, University of Maryland, Baltimore County
- Thesis: The Igbo Political Institutions and Transition (1970)

Mazi Elechukwu Nnadibuagha Njaka (23 June 1921 – 14 January 1975) was a Nigerian political scientist, known for the book Igbo Political Culture.

== Family background ==
E.N. Njaka was born in Okwaejiaku, Umukegwu, Akokwa on 23 June 1921. His father, Mazi George Maduneme Njaka, was one of the earliest Christian converts of the Catholic Denomination in Orlu province. His mother, Mrs. Mary Nwaku Njaka (née Egbebu), also from Umukegwu, was one of the earliest seamstresses to come from Mbanasaa clan. Elechukwu was their second child.

== Education ==
Elechukwu started his education at St. Barnabas Catholic Primary School, Akokwa. On the advice of his missionary friend, Rev. Father Liddan, his father sent Elechukwu to Adazi in the present Anambra State to complete his primary education. In 1937, following the establishment of St. Michael's Catholic Parish, Urualla, he was sent there to teach. Thus he became the first primary school teacher in Mbanasaa clan. A year later (1938), he gained admission into the Christ the King College (CKC), Onitsha, for his secondary education.

After Elechukwu's wedding to Ulunwa R. Ọji, his first wife, he was sponsored by his father, in collaboration with his brother-in-law Dr. Nwafor Orizu (who later became Nigeria's second Senate President and later acting President of Nigeria), to continue his education in the United States of America. While in the US, congresswoman and philanthropist, Frances P. Bolton, became his mentor. He obtained a bachelor's degree in History and Political Science from Xavier University and a master's degree in the same topic from University of California, Los Angeles.

During his undergraduate years, Elechukwu wrote to W.E.B. Du Bois, challenging him on his use of the word "negro". Du Bois replied, "If black people were called epilogimistes instead of Negroes they would still be the same people with the same problems, with the same past and future."

== Community development work ==
Elechukwu returned home in 1958 to collect materials for his doctoral studies thesis and decided to stay for some years, having seen the high rate of local illiteracy and hardship. He founded the Earnest Gems Grammar School (EGGS) in Akokwa and co-founded the Community Secondary School, Nsirimo in Umuahia South L.G.A of Abia State. Elechukwu stayed back to make his community better. In the early 1960s, Elechukwu decided to enter politics, and because his first wife whom his father married for him was not educated, he married Felicia Omanukwube Asogwo( The first certified female teacher in Akokwa-The Lady with the Iron Horse -a name she derived because of her white bicycle) Omanu was the wife that stood behind her husband during the 1963 Nsikak Commission of Inquiry which probed into the correct spelling of the towns name -Akokwa or Akaokwa.

Mazi Njaka was elected as an Honorable Member of the Eastern Nigeria House of Assembly representing the Mbanasa Clan. He was the first politician in the Old Orlu Provience to win election as an Independent.While representing his community, he pursued community development and resolved ensuing political disputes.

Njaka described the importance of negotiation in Igbo politics as follows: Deny an Igbo food but allow him to speak, and he will never forget the good you have done him. Through language, he believes, he can not only achieve an immediate result but also win the acquiescence of those whose lasting support is needed. In addition, it is talk and the response to it that measure political potency, not the amount of force that is exerted. Force portends weakness in politics as racism does in reason. Confirmed in this belief, the Igbo normally prefers negotiating to fighting. However, when fighting becomes unavoidable, he utilizes the symbols of his ancestors to strengthen his desire to live and survive.[6]

Returning to the United States in 1967, Njaka raised money for a family member to come to school in the US and escape the Nigerian Civil War.

== Academic career ==
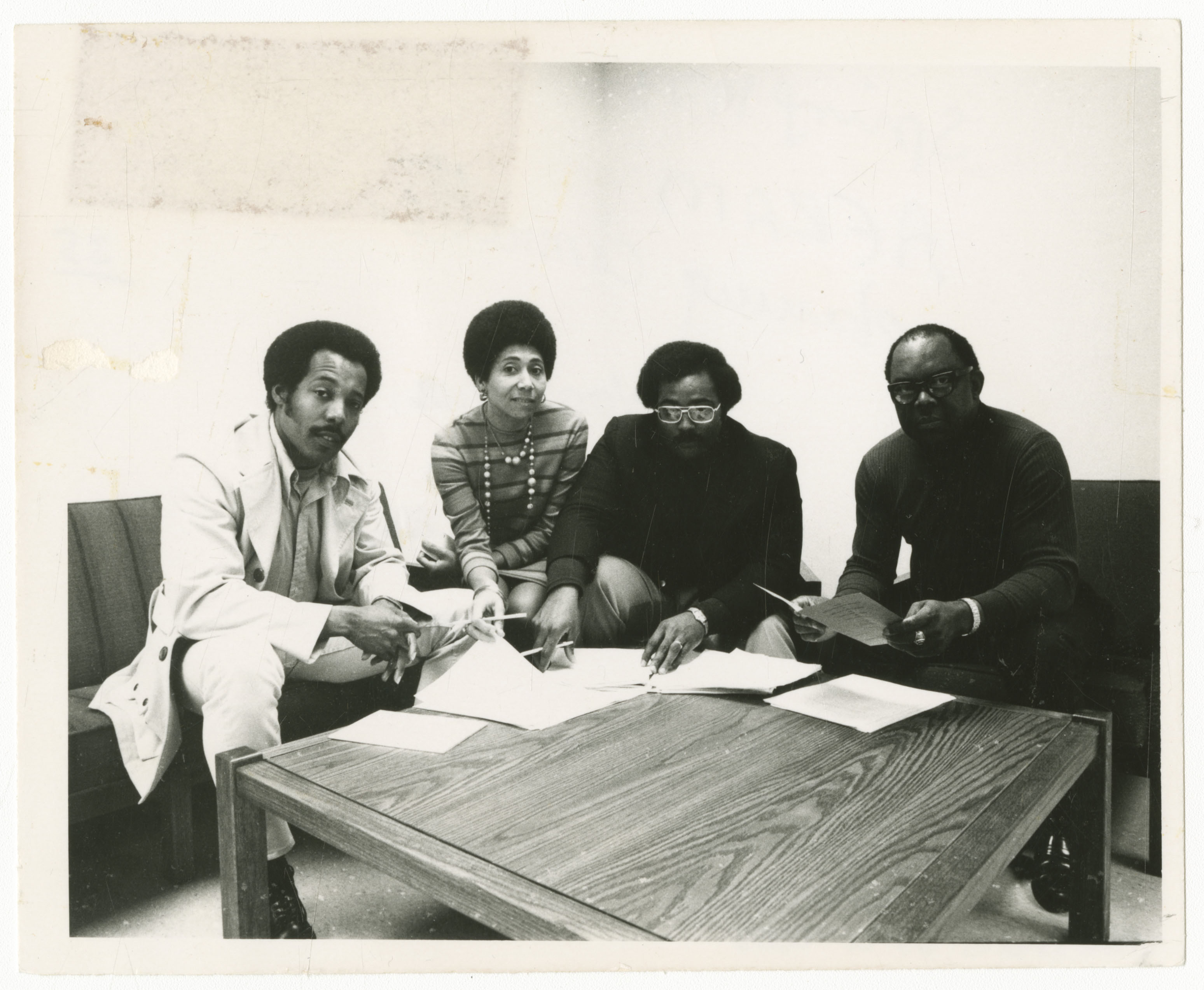
Pioneering Africana Studies Faculty Members

- 1968-1971 Chairman of the Political Studies Department, Tuskegee Institute
- 1974 Published Igbo Political Culture
- 1971-1975 Head of the African American Studies Department, University of Maryland, Baltimore County

When setting up the African American Studies programme at UMBC In 1971, Njaka recognized the importance of understanding "Whiteness" when tackling racial issues: "We haven't yet known the white man. We need to understand why the white man has been doing what he has been doing to us. This will enable us to reach a better compromise between races and an opportunity to live together as human beings." Elechukwu described himself as a racist of a different kind. He said "I see one race that is, the human race, which include everyone regardless of their particular color or nationality" At UMBC Elechukwu was a "one-man-gang" He conceived the curriculum, recruited the first faculty members, administered a budget and a small support staff, and himself taught courses. For his contribution in American education, Elechukwu was honored as Outstanding Educators of America in 1973.

His book, Igbo Political Culture not only explored Igbo political wisdom but also its broader application in the Pan-African project. For example:

The Igbo have a vivid saying that what is learned from the land (that is, from the root of the culture) is far more helpful and lasting than whatever is acquired through imitation. The Africa of today does not provide grounds for optimism for the future of the continent. We must attempt to seek the factors that made Africa the mother of world civilizations. The biblical prodigal son returned to survive. For Africa to regain its glory and leadership by redeeming itself and reengaging in the humanization of mankind, it is paramount important for Africa to reach for roots.
