= Jessica O. Matthews =

Inventor and entrepreneur

- Education: Harvard College, Harvard Business School
- Occupations: Inventor, CEO
- Years active: 2008-present
- Organization(s): Uncharted, KDDC
- Known for: Soccket
- Website: www.uncharted.city

Jessica O. Matthews is a Nigerian-American inventor, founder, CEO and venture capitalist. She is the co-founder of Uncharted, which made Soccket, a soccer ball that can be used as a portable power generator. Matthews attended Harvard College and graduated from Harvard Business School. In 2011, Fortune named her one of its "10 Most Powerful Women Entrepreneurs" and in 2015, named her as one of it "Most Promising Women Entrepreneurs". In 2012, the Harvard Foundation for Intercultural and Race Relations named her "Scientist of the Year." Matthews is a dual citizen of the U.S. and Nigeria. The President of Nigeria named her an "Ambassador for Entrepreneurship" for the country.

== Early life ==
Matthews was born on February 13, 1988, and grew up in Poughkeepsie, New York, as a dual citizen of the United States and Nigeria. She is the second of four children. Her parents run a software business, Decision Technologies International and her sister, Tiana Idoni-Matthews, became a marketing director of Uncharted Play. Matthews attended Our Lady of Lourdes High School, as a teenager pursuing science fairs and track and field. Matthews then attended Harvard College where she majored in Economics and later Harvard Business School.

== Career ==
=== Uncharted Play ===
As a junior in college in 2008, Matthews and classmate Julia Silverman invented Soccket as part of an assignment for an engineering class. She has described the inspiration for the invention as coming from an experience attending her aunt's wedding in Nigeria. When the electricity was lost and diesel generators were used to keep the lights on, Matthews recognized the health hazard posed from fumes and decided to try to do something about it. She and Silverman presented Soccket as their proposed solution, a soccer ball that stores kinetic energy as it's used. A half-hour of play with the soccer ball generates enough energy to power a small, attachable LED light for three hours, so that play with soccer ball also provides children a reading light with which to do their homework after dark. The two founded Uncharted Power to develop Soccket, with Matthews becoming CEO.

After graduating from college in 2010, Matthews took a full-time job working at a crowd-funding company called CrowdTap. The following year, she left that company to work on Uncharted Power full-time, initially raising funds through Kickstarter and then utilizing convertible debt. That same year, she presented Soccket at the Clinton Global Initiative University and on President Barack Obama's 2013 trip to Tanzania. The company also makes a jump rope that stores energy in a means similar to Soccket called the Pulse, which generates three hours of power for an LED through 15 minutes of jumping rope.

The initial manufacturing run of Soccket encountered significant quality control issues, so Matthews moved production to Uncharted Play's own facilities in New York. She subsequently shifted the company's focus to developing a broader range of kinetic-energy-storing products in partnership with experienced manufacturers. This shift included trademarking MORE, an acronym for Motion-based Off-Grid Renewable Energy, a system which uses Soccket's energy-storing method in consumer products beyond toys. "Matthews describes her company's proprietary MORE technology as an energy harvesting and emanating building block that can be seamlessly integrated into various infrastructures, objects and products — everything from floor panels, streets, speedbumps and sidewalks, to subway turnstiles, strollers, shopping carts and beyond."

=== Uncharted Power ===
In 2016, Uncharted Power had been profitable for three consecutive years and doubled gross profit margins year by year. In 2016, Matthews raised $7 million in Series A funding for Uncharted Power, with the company valued at $57 million. TechCrunch reported that this made Matthews the 13th black female founder to have raised more than $1 million in funding. By March 2017, 500,000 Socckets and Pulses had been used in developing regions, primarily in Africa and Latin America. In 2016, when Matthews moved Uncharted Power to Harlem, New York, she created a non-profit arm, the Harlem Tech Fund (HTF), which aims to support 100 new startups and offer technology training to 10,000 Harlem residents over the next two to five years. Matthews serves as chairman of the board of HTF. In the same year, she was recognized at the Harlem Economic Development Day, receiving the Outstanding Corporate Diversity Award.

=== Other ===
Matthews has expanded to work on global infrastructure projects. She is co-founder and executive director of KDDC, developing a hydropower dam project in Nigeria. The 30-megawatt dam is among the first hydroelectric dam projects privatized in Nigeria. In 2021, she was appointed by the U.S. Secretary of Energy to the U.S. Department of Energy's Electricity Advisory Committee (EAC).

== Recognition ==
Matthews has received numerous awards, honors and recognition. In 2013, she was named "Innovator of the Year" by Black Enterprise, and was recognised as both one of Forbes 30 Under 30 and Inc.'s 30 under 30 in 2014 and 2016 respectively, and selected twice by Fortune for recognition. Matthews received the "One Young World Entrepreneur of the Year" Award in 2020.
