= Olivia Anakwe =

American fashion model

- Education: Pace University (B.A.)
- Occupation: Model
- Modeling information
- Height: 1.80 m (5 ft 11 in)
- Hair color: Brown
- Eye color: Brown
- Agency: Elite Model Management (New York, Los Angeles); Premium Models (Paris); d'management group (Milan); Models 1 (London); Line-Up Model Management (Barcelona); Scoop Models (Copenhagen)

Olivia Anakwe is an American fashion model.

== Early life and education ==
Anakwe, who is of Nigerian heritage, was born in Bucks County, Pennsylvania. She began college at the University of Pittsburgh and transferred to Pace University where she graduated summa cum laude with a bachelor's degree in psychology.

== Career ==
Anakwe was discovered while visiting her sister in New York City. She signed to Elite Model Management and walked in 40 shows during her first season, including Miu Miu, Marc Jacobs, Jacquemus, Thom Browne, Kate Spade, Emilio Pucci, Preen by Thornton Bregazzi, and Prabal Gurung. She has appeared in advertisements for Glossier and YSL Beauté, as well as Marc Jacobs, Bobbi Brown, and Pat McGrath. Anakwe has appeared in editorials for Vogue, Vogue Italia, Vogue Japan, Vogue Korea, and W among others.
