= Ilesanmi Adesida =

Nigerian physicist

- Born: 1949 (age 76–77); Ifon, Ondo State, Nigeria
- Education: University of California, Berkeley
- Known for: Material science
- Scientific career
- Fields: Electrical engineering
- Workplaces: University of Illinois at Urbana-Champaign; Nazarbayev University

Ilesanmi Adesida (born 1949, in Ifon, Ondo State, Nigeria) is a Nigerian American physicist of Yoruba descent. He has been the provost at Nazarbayev University in Astana, Kazakhstan, from September 2016.

Adesida is also the Donald Biggar Willett Professor Emeritus of Engineering at the University of Illinois at Urbana-Champaign; he retired from Illinois in 2016. In May 2012, the board of trustees of the University of Illinois selected Adesida to be the next vice chancellor for academic affairs and provost of the Urbana campus, a position he held from August 15, 2012 to August 31, 2015. Other positions that Adesida held at Illinois included dean of the college of engineering, director of the Center for Nanoscale Science and Technology, director of the Micro and Nanotechnology Laboratory, professor of materials science and engineering, professor of electrical and computer engineering, professor of the Beckman Institute for Advanced Science and Technology, and professor of the Coordinated Science Laboratory. In 2006, Adesida was elected as a member into the National Academy of Engineering for contributions to the nanometer-scale processing of semiconductor structures and applications in high performance electronic and optoelectronic devices. Adesida was also a member of the board of Fluor Corporation from 2007 to 2011.

Adesida's field of academic research is nanotechnology with special emphasis on high-speed devices used in communications. His research expertise also includes nanofabrication science and technology, high-speed optoelectronic devices and wide-bandgap materials and devices.

Adesida earned his bachelor's (1974), master's (1975), and doctoral (1979) degrees in electrical engineering from the University of California, Berkeley.

== Research ==
Adesida is an expert in the processing of semiconductors and other materials at the nanometer-scale level and in ultra-high-speed heterostructure field-effect transistors—the sort of transistors used in cell-phones, fiber optics communications, deep space communications, and other applications. His contributions have provided insights into the limits of advanced lithography and other nanofabrication techniques.

He and his students continue to work in the areas of nanoelectronics and high-speed optoelectronic devices and circuits. Recent work has focused on the development of devices and circuits in the key materials such as indium phosphide and gallium nitride utilized in high-performance Wireless, optical fiber communications, and high temperature applications. He has published over 350 referenced papers, has presented over 250 papers at international conferences, and has written many book chapters.

== Professional organizations and honors ==
Adesida is a fellow of the Institute of Electrical and Electronics Engineers (IEEE), the American Association for the Advancement of Science (AAAS), the American Vacuum Society, and the Optical Society of America.

He is a member of the National Academy of Engineering, the Minerals, Metals and Materials Society, the Nigerian Academy of Engineering, the Materials Research Society, and the Society for Engineering Education.

In 1994, he received the Oakley-Kunde Award for Excellence in Undergraduate Education from Illinois, and in 1996 he won the Best Paper Award at the Micro- and Nano-Engineering Conference. In 2011, he was awarded the Electrons Devices Society Distinguished Service Award by the Institute of Electrical and Electronics Engineers. In 2016, he won the Functional Materials John Bardeen Award from The Minerals, Metals and Materials Society.

At Illinois, he was appointed a University Scholar and an Associate Member of the Center for Advanced Study. He is a former president of the IEEE Electron Device Society, a winner of the EMSA Presidential Student Award; an IEEE Electron Device Society Distinguished Lecturer (1997–2002); a member of the Bohmische Physical Society (1988); and the holder of an IBM Postdoctoral Fellowship (1979–1981).

In 2013, he was selected as a Great Immigrant Honoree by the Carnegie Foundation of America.

== Books ==
- Science and Technology in Africa, ISBN 978-1-59221-112-8

== Patents ==
- US Patent 5880482 – Low dark current photodetector
