= Demola Aladekomo =

Nigerian computer engineer (born 1957)

Sir Demola Ben Aladekomo KJW
- Demola
- Born: 31 December 1957 (age 68); Lagos, Nigeria
- Education: B.Sc Computer Engineering, Obafemi Awolowo University Ife - 1982; MBA University of Lagos -1984
- Occupation: Computer engineer
- Known for: Pioneering the first e-card in Nigeria
- Spouse: Very Reverend Titi Aladekomo
- Children: Four
- Engineering career
- Institutions: DATA Foundation

Demola Aladekomo KJW HOA (born 31 December 1957) is a Nigerian computer engineer and businessman. He is the chairman of SmartCity Resorts Plc, Card Centre Nigeria Limited, Treasure-nest Limited, Crops Nigeria Limited, Chams Consortium Limited, and Insider Concepts Limited. He is also the founder of Chams Plc.

Aladekomo is a Fellow of the Nigeria Computer Society (FNCS) and of the Computer Professional Registration Council of Nigeria (CPN). He is also a member of the Nigerian Society of Engineers (NSE). He is the immediate past president of the Lagos Business School Alumni Association (LBSAA) and of the Nigeria Computer Society. He has also served as vice chairman of the Board of Trustees of the SmartCard Society of Nigeria.

He is the founder of DATA Foundation and Volunteer Corps, non-governmental organisations focused on corporate social investments in Nigeria. He is a patron and "Handler of the Order of Anchor (HOA)" of the Lagos State Council of the Boys' Brigade in Nigeria.

== Early life and family ==
Aladekomo graduated from the University of Ife (now Obafemi Awolowo University) in 1982 with a degree in computer engineering. He obtained a Master of Business Administration (MBA) from the University of Lagos in 1984.

He was Chief Executive Programmer at the Lagos Business School (LBS) from 1991 to 1992.

== Professional life ==
Aladekomo founded Chams Limited (now Chams Plc), as the first indigenous computer maintenance company in Nigeria in September 1985. It also contributed to the development of the first e-payment card in Nigeria, the Valuecard project, in collaboration with a consortium of five local banks.

=== National Identity Number (NIN) ===
Between 2007 and 2010, Aladekomo led the rollout of the National Identity Management Commission (NIMC) National Identification Number (NIN) project, which laid the foundation for Nigeria's national identity infrastructure.

=== SIM registration ===
In 2011, Aladekomo played a role in the Nigerian Communications Commission (NCC) SIM registration project, which enabled the registration of millions of SIM cards nationwide.

=== Bank Verification Number (BVN) ===
He also oversaw the 2013–2014 implementation of the Bank Verification Number (BVN) project of the Central Bank of Nigeria (CBN) and the Nigeria Inter-Bank Settlement System (NIBSS), which enhanced banking security and financial inclusion in Nigeria.

=== INEC voter database ===
In 2007, Chams produced a refined database of 54.3 million Nigerians and managed the delivery of voter cards for the Independent National Electoral Commission (INEC). At its Abuja card factory, the company achieved a world record for the largest card personalisation centre, with a capacity of 1.75 million cards per day.

=== Guinness World Records ===
In 2008, Chams established ChamsCities in Lagos and Abuja, which were recognised by the Guinness World Records for being the largest cyber centres in the world at the time.

=== Later career ===
Aladekomo served as president of the Nigerian Computer Society from 2011 to 2013 and as president of the Lagos Business School Alumni Association from 2012 to 2014. He voluntarily retired from Chams after 30 years of service.

He is currently the executive chairman of SmartCity Plc, where he is overseeing the development of HazanaCity, a polycentric smart city with residential areas, a technology hub, and markets, located in Ibadan and Osogbo.

== Philanthropic activities ==
Aladekomo is a Knight of John Wesley. He is the founder and past chairman of the Board of Trustees of Volunteer Corps and the DATA Foundation, non-governmental organisations focused on professional volunteerism for public school education. Through these platforms, scholarships have been awarded to students in public schools.

He has also served in various capacities, including:

- Council member, Osun State University
- Board member, Osun State University Advancement Board
- Board member, Obafemi Awolowo University (OAUTECHEXCEL), the foundation implementing a knowledge park at the university
- Patron, Lagos City Chorale Group
- Patron, Boys' Brigade Nigeria
- Member, Nigerian Economic Summit Group (NESG), contributing to Vision 2010 and Vision 2020

== Personal life ==
Aladekomo is married to Titi Aladekomo, a Methodist minister, entrepreneur, and philanthropist. They have four children, including Tomiwa Aladekomo, as well as grandchildren.

== See also ==
- Philip Emeagwali
- Peter Okebukola
- Charles Uwadia
- Muhammad Sirajo Aliyu
