= Mobolaji Dawodu =

Nigerian–American fashion stylist

- Born: 1980 (age 44–45)
- Citizenship: Nigeria
- Occupation: Costume designer

Mobolaji Olujimi Dawodu is a Nigerian-American fashion stylist. He is best known as the style fashion editor and fashion director at GQStyle where he has styled Brad Pitt, Jared Leto and Mahershala Ali. He also served as costume designer for the Disney film Queen of Katwe (2016). Dawodu has worked as a fashion stylist for GQ and Fader magazines, as well as costume designer for the films Queen of Katwe and "Where is Kyra?"

== Early life ==
Dawodu grew up in Lagos, Nigeria and Virginia, U.S.A. He was born in the United States to an American mother and Nigerian father. Dawodu went back to Nigeria with his parents when he was 5 weeks old. He moved back to Virginia at about the age of 10. His mother owned a clothing business that combined modern style with traditional fabric.
