= Soccket =

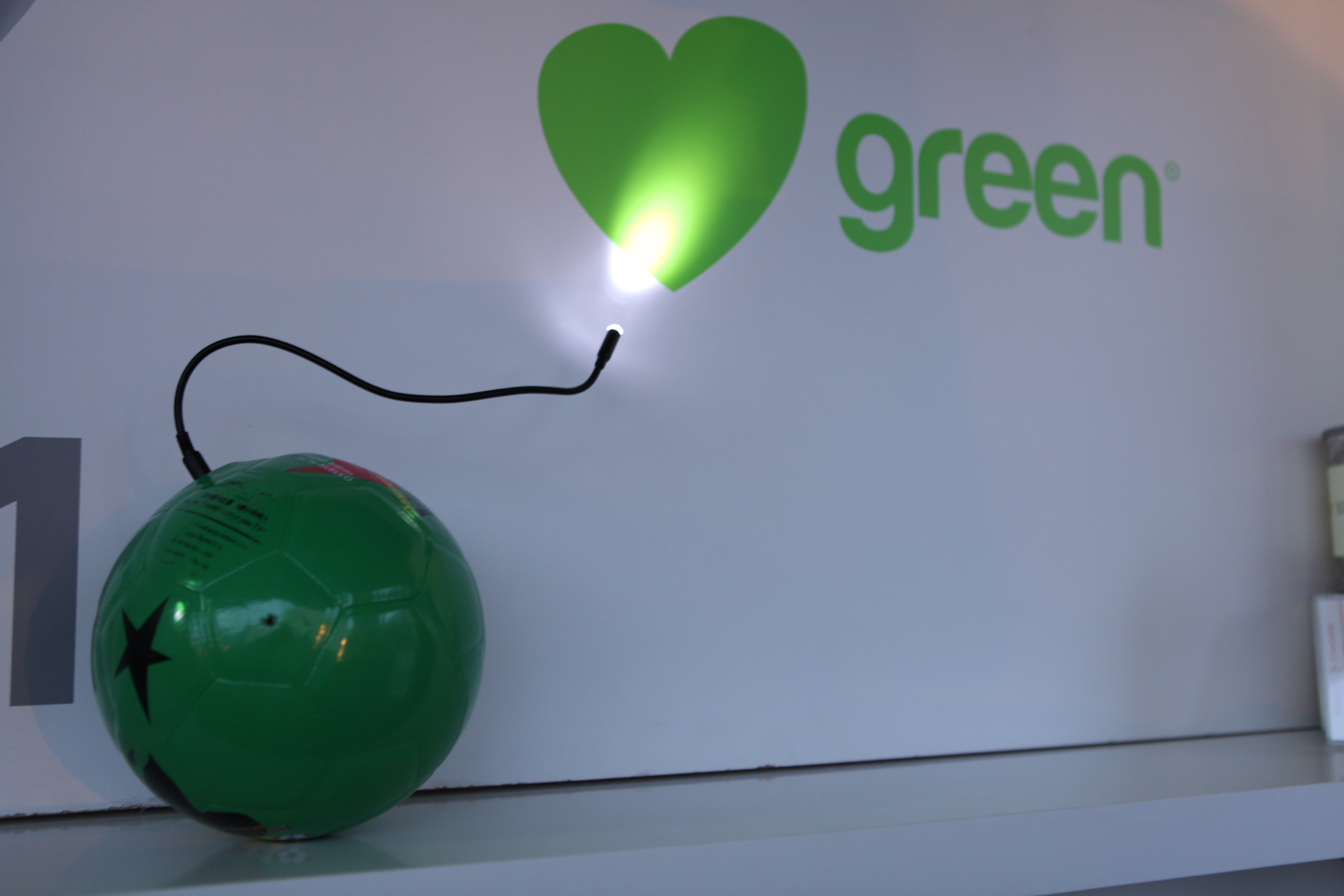
The SOCCKET ball powering a light

SOCCKET was a soccer ball that harnesses and stores energy from play for later use as a portable power source in resource-poor areas. It was the flagship product of Uncharted Play, Incorporated (now Uncharted Power).

== History ==
Jessica Lin, Julia Silverman, Jessica O. Matthews, Hemali Thakkar, who were at the time undergraduates at Harvard University, and Aviva Presser, who was a Harvard graduate student at the time, were the inventors listed on the initial patent. Prototypes of the ball first appeared in the media in early 2010. The mass-produced version of the ball is the brainchild of Uncharted Play, Inc.—a social enterprise founded by two of the original inventors, Jessica O. Matthews and Julia C. Silverman. According to Engineering for Change, the product was discontinued in 2016. Uncharted, the company which made it, led as of 2021 by Jessica O. Matthews, no longer features the product on their website, but notes that the company initially worked on "energy-generating play products" before shifting to other areas.

== Media reaction ==
The SOCCKET scored on the "Highbrow" and "Brilliant" quadrant of New York's "Approval Matrix" for the week of February 8, 2010.

It has been reported to have broken quickly after the first use by some recipients. By 2016, production of Soccket had ceased, and Uncharted Play shifted its focus toward broader renewable energy infrastructure projects under the name Uncharted Power.
