= POST Houston =

Historic building in Houston, Texas

Coordinates: 29.7663°N 95.3647°W

- Address: 401 Franklin St; Houston, TX 77002-1569
- Location: Downtown Houston
- Owner: Lovett Commercial
- Operator: Lovett Commercial
- Capacity: 5,000 (713 Music Hall); 1,750 (The Office); 500 (X Atrium); 450 (Outpost)

Construction
- Groundbreaking: June 27, 2019
- Opened: November 13, 2021
- Cost: $31 million
- Architects: OMA; Powers Brown Architecture
- Structural engineer: IMEG Corp
- Services engineer: DBR Engineering Consultants
- General contractor: Harvey Builders

Website
- Venue Website

POST Houston is an entertainment venue in Downtown Houston, Texas, United States which was formerly a major regional post office known as Houston Downtown Post Office. The sorting facility was renamed to honor Barbara Jordan. The property is listed on the National Register of Historic Places. From 1887, the area had been developed as Grand Central Station for the Houston and Texas Central Railroad. The Southern Pacific Railroad built a new facility in 1934.

== History ==
=== Grand Central Depot ===
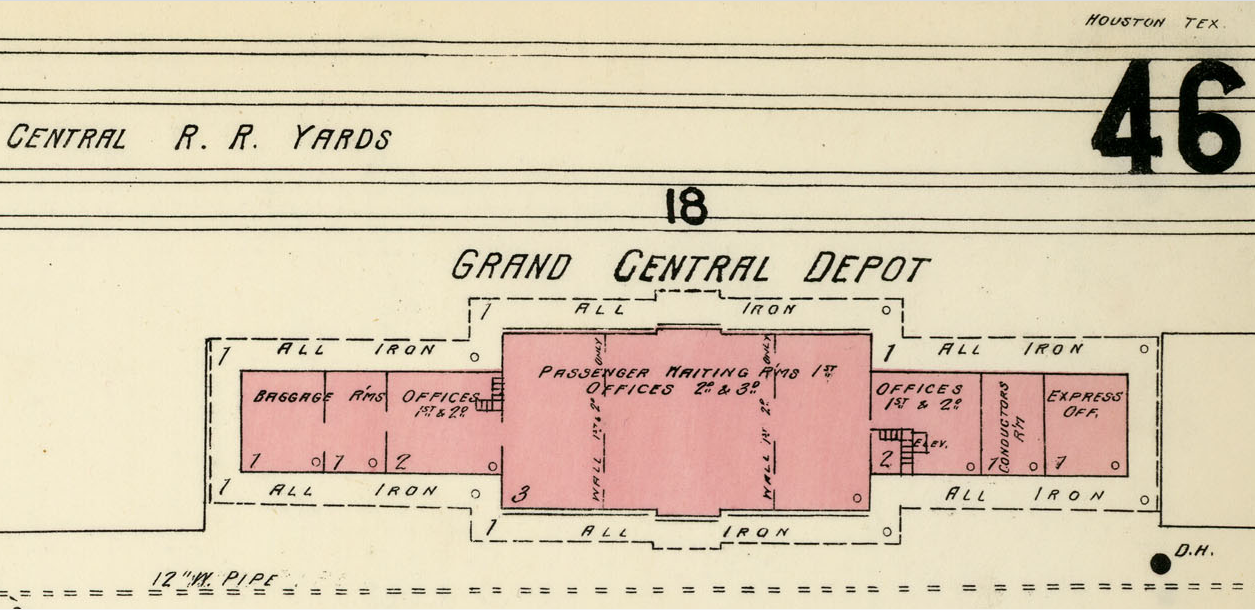
Grand Central Depot in 1896

The Houston and Texas Central Railroad used part of this site as a railroad depot in the late nineteenth century. Known as Houston Grand Central Depot, it was on the north side of Washington Avenue between 7th and 8th Streets as portrayed on the 1896 Sanborn Map. The first Grand Central Station was a three-story brick structure built in 1887 at a cost of $80,000. Two remodelings ensued: one in 1906 and the other in 1914.

The Southern Pacific Railroad constructed a new Grand Central Station in 1934. Though the first Grand Central Station was attached to the Houston and Texas Central name, that railroad was already under the ownership of the Southern Pacific Railroad, which continued to run this subsidiary under its old name through 1927. The depot added a train shed in 1907.

Wyatt C. Hedrick designed the second Grand Central Station, which was opened on 1 September 1934. The Southern Pacific Railroad and City of Houston redeveloped the site at a cost of about $4.3 million, which entailed stabilizing the bayou and rerouting some local streets. New infrastructure included additional tracks, new trains sheds, and the passenger depot. The main part of the complex was built to four stories upon a base clad in pink granite, with the rest of the outer walls covered in Texas Cordova limestone. The passenger waiting room featured arches and flooring, black walnut trimming, and two glass ornaments hanging from the ceiling. Two large murals by John McQuarrie recalled Texas history. The first portrayed Sam Houston arriving at his namesake city at its founding superimposed over a modern depiction of the city. The second portrayed a group of Texas pioneers: some 1823 colonists juxtaposed with the empresarios, Stephen F. Austin and Baron von Bastrop.

=== Barbara Jordan Post Office ===
Around 1936, the US Post Office occupied an adjacent property for a package facility. The Post Office appeared on a 1951 map with an L-configuration, though a 1960 map shows an expansion of the building footprint.

The Barbara Jordan Post Office was closed on May 15, 2015. The post office employed over 2,000 workers who processed mail overnight. The US Postal Service transferred operations to the Sam Houston Station at 1500 Hadley Street.

=== Lovett Commercial Acquisition ===
After its closure, the Barbara Jordan Post Office was bought by Lovett Commercial, who redeveloped the building with the intention of transforming it into a cultural epicenter for the city of Houston. The building now contains a food court, art exhibits, coworking spaces and a music venue, along with a five acre rooftop park and garden.
