= Atlanta Tech Village =

Technology incubator in Atlanta, Georgia

- Industry: Tech incubator
- Founded: 2012
- Founder: David Cummings
- Website: atlantatechvillage.com

Atlanta Tech Village is a technology incubator complex located in the Buckhead community of Atlanta, Georgia.

== History ==
Atlanta Tech Village was founded by David Cummings in 2012 as a small business incubator. Within its first year, the incubator housed 180 tenant companies.

== Incubator ==
The Village is currently the fourth-largest tech hub in the US, housing approximately 300 companies as of 2018. It partners with major corporations such as Turner, Google, Amazon, Microsoft, and Coca-Cola to facilitate relationships between startups and established companies. Notable companies that have been part of the Village include Yik Yak, BitPay, and IO Education. The Village also hosts international branches of foreign tech companies alongside American startups. Approximately 1,000 entrepreneurs work within the complex, which is connected to angel investors, funding sources, and business mentors. Additionally, the Village offers a pre-accelerator program supporting minorities and women in the early stages of their business development.
