= Olalekan Adeeko =

Nigerian educator

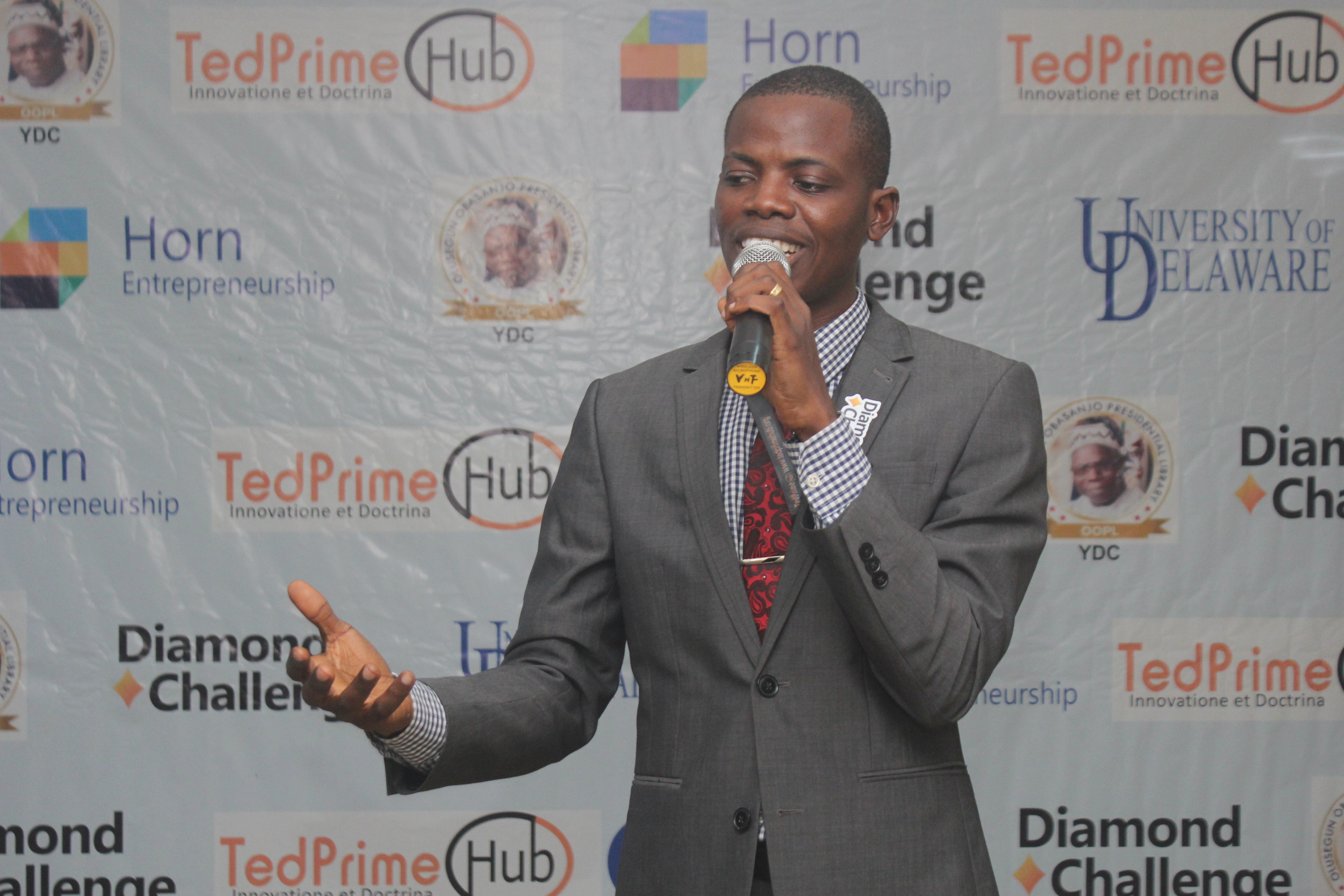
- Born: Nigeria
- Education: Computer Science
- Occupations: Computer scientist, data analyst, educator
- Known for: Teaching technology in Yoruba; Co-founder of Tedprime Hub

Olalekan Adeeko is a Nigerian computer scientist, data analyst and educator. He teaches technology in his native Yoruba language on TikTok, YouTube and Facebook and co-founded Tedprime Hub – an initiative focused on providing educational resource and training teachers and students to promote SDGs. He is the first Nigerian winner of African Union Continental Teacher Prize (2020) and received Microsoft Most Valuable Professional (MVP) in Africa 2024.

== Career ==
Olalekan Adeeko is a graduate of computer science and professional data analyst. He taught technology at Baptist's Boy's High School, Ogun State for 15 years. Adeeko played a significant role in the OgunDigiClass – an education project of Ogun State during the COVID-19 lockdown. He has trained over 10,000 teachers across 19 states in Nigeria and has represented the country in international competitions across Africa, Asia, Europe and America.

In 2022, Adeeko began teaching technology in his native Yoruba language TikTok, Facebook and YouTube. He is co-founder of Tedprime Hub – an initiative focused on providing educational resource and training teachers and students to promote SDGs with several projects including Edo Girls Can Code, Codeliners, STEM HER and Teach Right.

== Prizes and honours ==
Adeeko has received several prizes, awards and honors including the Teaching Excellence and Achievement Fellowship Award by International Research & Exchanges Board (IREX) (2015). In 2018, he received Microsoft Innovative Educator award in Singapore and Microsoft Fellow in Paris in 2019. He won the Inspirational Educator of the Year in 2019 and emerged first runner up of Presidents Teachers & Schools Excellence Award, 2019. He won the 1st Prize Union Bank Edtech Challenge for the development of Edubox – a device that brings online educational resource to communities without internet access. Adeeko won African Union Continental Teacher Prize (2020), the first Nigerian to receive the prize and received Microsoft Most Valuable Professional (MVP) in Africa 2024.
