= AQT (singer) =

American-based Nigerian musician and entrepreneur

- Born: Abdul Quam Tadese; Brooklyn, New York, USA
- Other names: AQT
- Occupations: Singer; songwriter; entrepreneur
- Website: aqtbrand.com

Abdul Quam Tadese, known professionally as AQT, is a Nigerian-American Afro-fusion singer and songwriter based in Houston. He is known for blending African rhythmic elements with contemporary music.

== Early life and career ==
AQT was born in Brooklyn, New York, but spent his early childhood in Houston, Texas. He obtained a Bachelor's degree in Business Management at The University of Texas.

AQT began his musical journey as one half of the music duo GALAKTiQ, which he formed with a friend from university. They performed with artists like Olamide, L.A.X and DJ Consequence. Collaborating with artists and contributing to group projects before embarking on a solo career. His music has been described as a fusion of Afrobeat, Arabian influences, and contemporary pop, showcasing different sounds and cultural elements. He is also credited to have been involved in community driven events and contents, he was spoken about in this regard by Nigerian-born NBA Hall of Famer Hakeem Olajuwon. He released his debut album, Olanrewaju in September 2025.

== Business ventures ==
Amanar Group is a company associated with AQT. The organization operates across multiple sectors.

In 2023, Amanar served as a partner for the Afrobeats Festival in Berlin, and artist liaison for performances by artists including Asake, Peter Okoye of P-Square, Oxlade, and Victony. In Nigeria, Amanar has organized events within university communities, like the UNILAG Independence Day Festival, which featured performances by emerging artists including TML Vibez, T.I Blaze, and Mavo.

The company has also been associated with the Beach House Party in Lagos and expanded editions of the Independence Day Festival held in Kaduna State. In June 2025, AQT and Amanar Group hosted the Camp Lagos event in partnership with American producer, Scorp Dezel. Camp Lagos is an industry-focused program through workshops and collaborative studio sessions.

== Discography ==
- Olánrewàjú
