= The Real Housewives of Potomac season 11 =

The Real Housewives of Potomac
- Season 11
- Promotional poster via Peacock
- Starring: Gizelle Bryant; Ashley Darby; Karen Huger; Wendy Osefo; Stacey Rusch; Tia Glover; Courtney Ajinça
- No. of episodes: 6

Release
- Original network: Bravo
- Original release: October 11, 2026 – present

Season chronology
- ← Previous; Season 10

The eleventh season of The Real Housewives of Potomac, an American reality television series, is broadcast on Bravo. It premiered on October 11, 2026. It was primarily filmed in Potomac, Maryland. The season's executive producers are Steven Weinstock, Glenda Hersh, Lauren Eskelin, Lorraine Lawson, Nora Devin Zimmerman, Leola Westbrook-Lawrence, Jackie Hebert, Nick Prescott and Andy Cohen.

The season focuses on the personal and professional lives of Gizelle Bryant, Karen Huger, Ashley Darby, Wendy Osefo, Stacey Rusch, Tia Glover and Courtney Ajinça, with Robyn Dixon and Monique Samuels appearing as friends of the housewives.

== Cast ==
In April 2026, it was announced production had commenced on the eleventh season, with Gizelle Bryant, Ashley Darby, Wendy Osefo, Stacey Rusch and Tia Glover returning. Courtney Ajinça will join as a new housewife, with former housewife Karen Huger set to return in a full-time capacity, alongside Robyn Dixon as a "friend of". Angel Massie, Keiarna Stewart, and Jassi Rideaux were not announced to return. Monique Samuels was later revealed to be returning for her second consecutive season as a "friend of".

== Production ==
The Real Housewives of Potomac is produced by Truly Original for Bravo. Steven Weinstock, Glenda Hersh, Lauren Eskelin, Lorraine Lawson, Nora Devin Zimmerman, Leola Westbrook-Lawrence, Jackie Hebert, Nick Prescott and Andy Cohen are recognized as the series' executive producers. EJ Dutton serves as co-executive producer.

== Episodes ==
The Real Housewives of Potomac season 11 episodes
No. overall	No. in season	Title	Rating (18–49)	Original release date	U.S. viewers (millions)
193	1	"Read Between the Lies"	TBA	October 11, 2026	N/A
194	2	"Sofia Home!"	TBA	October 18, 2026	N/A
195	3	"She Said, She Said"	TBA	October 25, 2026	TBD
196	4	"Tough Love"	TBA	November 1, 2026	TBD
197	5	"Shady Beaches"	TBA	November 8, 2026	TBD
198	6	"Something in the Water"	TBA	November 15, 2026	TBD
199	7	"Cold Beach, Hot Gossip"	TBA	November 22, 2026	TBD
200	8	"Surprise Surprise"	TBA	November 29, 2026	TBD
201	9	"Sorori-Tea! Fun"	TBA	December 6, 2026	TBD
