= The Real Housewives of Potomac season 6 =

The Real Housewives of Potomac
- Season 6
- Cover used by the iTunes Store
- Starring: Gizelle Bryant; Ashley Darby; Robyn Dixon; Karen Huger; Candiace Dillard Bassett; Wendy Osefo; Mia Thornton
- No. of episodes: 22

Release
- Original network: Bravo
- Original release: July 11 – December 5, 2021

Season chronology
- ← Previous; Season 5 Next → Season 7

The sixth season of The Real Housewives of Potomac, an American reality television series, is broadcast on Bravo. It premiered on July 11, 2021, and is primarily filmed in Potomac, Maryland. Its executive producers are Steven Weinstock, Glenda Hersh, Lauren Eskelin, Lorraine Haughton-Lawson, Thomas Kelly and Andy Cohen. The season focuses on the lives of Gizelle Bryant, Ashley Darby, Robyn Dixon, Karen Huger, Candiace Dillard Bassett, Wendy Osefo and Mia Thornton. Additionally, Askale Davis is featured as a friend of the housewives.

== Cast and synopsis ==
After the show's fifth season concluded, Monique Samuels revealed she would not be returning for the following season. The remaining six ladies all returned along with new housewife Mia Thornton and new friend of the housewives Askale Davis. Filming for the season began in January 2021 and concluded in May of the same year.

The reunion was filmed on October 7, 2021, with Nicki Minaj appearing as a guest host for a segment.

== Episodes ==
The Real Housewives of Potomac season 6 episodes
No. overall	No. in season	Title	Original release date	US viewers (millions)
90	1	"The Nude Interlude"	July 11, 2021	1.04
91	2	"Sing Sing for Your Supper"	July 18, 2021	0.88
92	3	"Jiminy Crickets"	July 25, 2021	0.89
93	4	"Going Ham at the Pajammy Jam"	August 1, 2021	0.88
94	5	"The Rumor Mill"	August 8, 2021	0.89
95	6	"Land of the Free, Home of the Shade"	August 15, 2021	0.98
96	7	"Gossip, Girl!"	August 22, 2021	1.07
97	8	"Talk to the Braids"	August 29, 2021	1.10
98	9	"High Infidelity"	September 5, 2021	0.88
99	10	"Goddesses of War"	September 12, 2021	1.01
100	11	"No Business Like Shade Business"	September 19, 2021	0.95
101	12	"Reasonably or Shady?"	September 26, 2021	1.00
102	13	"GVO or GTFO!"	October 3, 2021	0.94
103	14	"Tossing Salad and Spilling Tea (Bags)"	October 10, 2021	1.05
104	15	"Lost at Sea"	October 17, 2021	1.07
105	16	"Crab-Boiling Over"	October 24, 2021	1.09
106	17	"Altar-ed State of Mind"	October 31, 2021	1.02
107	18	"Reunion Part 1"	November 7, 2021	1.16
108	19	"Reunion Part 2"	November 14, 2021	1.01
109	20	"Reunion Part 3"	November 21, 2021	0.97
110	21	"Reunion Part 4: Nicki Minaj Takeover"	November 28, 2021	1.02
111	22	"Secrets Revealed"	December 5, 2021	0.45
