= List of The Real Housewives of Potomac episodes =

The Real Housewives of Potomac is an American reality television series that premiered January 17, 2016, on Bravo. The series' eleventh season chronicles the lives of seven women in and around Potomac— Gizelle Bryant, Ashley Darby, Karen Huger, Wendy Osefo, Stacey Rusch, Tia Glover and Courtney Ajinça —as they balance their personal and business lives, along with their social circle.

Former cast members featured over the previous seasons are: Robyn Dixon (1–8), Charrisse Jackson-Jordan (1–2), Katie Rost (1), Monique Samuels (2–5), Candiace Dillard Bassett (3–8), Mia Thornton (6–9), Nneka Ihim (8), Keiarna Stewart (9–10) and Angel Massie (10).

As of November 15, 2026, 198 original episodes of The Real Housewives of Potomac have aired.

== Series overview ==
The Real Housewives of Potomac episodes
| Season | Episodes | Originally released | | Average Viewers |
| Season | Episodes | First released | Last released | Average Viewers |
|---|---|---|---|---|
| 1 | 12 | January 17, 2016 | April 17, 2016 | 1.59 |
| 2 | 14 | April 2, 2017 | July 16, 2017 | 1.40 |
| 3 | 20 | April 1, 2018 | August 19, 2018 | 1.02 |
| 4 | 21 | May 5, 2019 | September 29, 2019 | 1.05 |
| 5 | 22 | August 2, 2020 | December 27, 2020 | 1.03 |
| 6 | 22 | July 11, 2021 | December 5, 2021 | 1.00 |
| 7 | 20 | October 9, 2022 | March 5, 2023 | 0.86 |
| 8 | 21 | November 5, 2023 | April 14, 2024 | 0.70 |
| 9 | 20 | October 6, 2024 | March 2, 2025 | 0.58 |
| 10 | 20 | October 5, 2025 | March 1, 2026 | 0.53 |
| 11 | TBA | October 11, 2026 | TBA | TBA |

== Episodes ==
=== Season 1 (2016) ===
Gizelle Bryant, Ashley Darby, Robyn Dixon, Karen Huger, Charrisse Jackson-Jordan and Katie Rost are introduced as series regulars.

The Real Housewives of Potomac season 1 episodes
| No. overall | No. in season | Title | Original release date | US viewers (millions) |
|---|---|---|---|---|
| 1 | 1 | "Mind Your Manners" | January 17, 2016 | 2.06 |
| 2 | 2 | "Divas, Queens, and Bubalas" | January 24, 2016 | 1.66 |
| 3 | 3 | "What a Little Whiskey Can Do" | January 31, 2016 | 1.65 |
| 4 | 4 | "Desperately Seeking Marriage" | February 14, 2016 | 1.42 |
| 5 | 5 | "Error on the High Seas" | February 21, 2016 | 1.62 |
| 6 | 6 | "Beach Session" | March 6, 2016 | 1.63 |
| 7 | 7 | "Reading Is Fundamental" | March 13, 2016 | 1.56 |
| 8 | 8 | "All Shades of Shade" | March 20, 2016 | 1.70 |
| 9 | 9 | "Fifty Sense" | March 27, 2016 | 1.59 |
| 10 | 10 | "Rules of Enragement" | April 3, 2016 | 1.64 |
| 11 | 11 | "Reunion Part One" | April 10, 2016 | 1.51 |
| 12 | 12 | "Reunion Part Two" | April 17, 2016 | 1.39 |

=== Season 2 (2017) ===
Katie Rost departed as a series regular. Monique Samuels joined the cast.

The Real Housewives of Potomac season 2 episodes
| No. overall | No. in season | Title | Original release date | US viewers (millions) |
|---|---|---|---|---|
| 13 | 1 | "Don't Let the Zip Code Fool Ya" | April 2, 2017 | 1.60 |
| 14 | 2 | "All Tea, All Shade" | April 9, 2017 | 1.76 |
| 15 | 3 | "Hold Your Horses" | April 16, 2017 | 1.62 |
| 16 | 4 | "Mother Knows Best" | April 23, 2017 | 1.81 |
| 17 | 5 | "Kick the Trick Out" | April 30, 2017 | 1.79 |
| 18 | 6 | "Messy Games" | May 7, 2017 | 1.77 |
| 19 | 7 | "Over the River and Thru the Woods" | May 21, 2017 | 1.07 |
| 20 | 8 | "War of the Darbys" | May 28, 2017 | 1.03 |
| 21 | 9 | "A Host of Issues" | June 4, 2017 | 1.10 |
| 22 | 10 | "Welcome to the Bermuda Triangle" | June 11, 2017 | 1.18 |
| 23 | 11 | "The Grand Dame Sham" | June 18, 2017 | 1.21 |
| 24 | 12 | "Home Is Where the Truth Is" | July 2, 2017 | 1.09 |
| 25 | 13 | "Reunion Part One" | July 9, 2017 | 1.17 |
| 26 | 14 | "Reunion Part Two" | July 16, 2017 | 1.38 |

=== Season 3 (2018) ===
Charrisse Jackson-Jordan departed as a series regular; she continued to appear in a recurring capacity. Candiace Dillard Bassett joined the cast.

The Real Housewives of Potomac season 3 episodes
| No. overall | No. in season | Title | Original release date | US viewers (millions) |
|---|---|---|---|---|
| 27 | 1 | "You Gotta Make Millions to Owe Millions" | April 1, 2018 | 1.18 |
| 28 | 2 | "Meet the Press" | April 8, 2018 | 1.23 |
| 29 | 3 | "Meme Your Own Business" | April 15, 2018 | 1.20 |
| 30 | 4 | "First Ladies and Second Chances" | April 22, 2018 | 1.15 |
| 31 | 5 | "Shades in a Bubble" | April 29, 2018 | 1.04 |
| 32 | 6 | "I Came from Jesus" | May 6, 2018 | 1.20 |
| 33 | 7 | "Blue Skies and Blue Eyes" | May 13, 2018 | 0.97 |
| 34 | 8 | "That's Scentertainment" | May 20, 2018 | 1.05 |
| 35 | 9 | "A Happy Medium" | May 27, 2018 | 1.01 |
| 36 | 10 | "RSVPlease!" | June 3, 2018 | 1.14 |
| 37 | 11 | "Ex's and Oh No's" | June 10, 2018 | 1.07 |
| 38 | 12 | "Can't Hide from These Green Eyes" | June 17, 2018 | 1.16 |
| 39 | 13 | "Mime Your Own Business" | July 1, 2018 | 0.90 |
| 40 | 14 | "Cannes We All Just Get Along" | July 8, 2018 | 0.88 |
| 41 | 15 | "Turm-Oil in France" | July 15, 2018 | 1.04 |
| 42 | 16 | "Au Revoir Drama" | July 22, 2018 | 0.97 |
| 43 | 17 | "Hot Gossip, Cold Pizza" | July 29, 2018 | 0.86 |
| 44 | 18 | "Unsolved Mystery" | August 5, 2018 | 1.03 |
| 45 | 19 | "Reunion Part 1" | August 12, 2018 | 1.07 |
| 46 | 20 | "Reunion Part 2" | August 19, 2018 | 1.04 |

=== Season 4 (2019) ===
Katie Rost served in a recurring capacity.

The Real Housewives of Potomac season 4 episodes
| No. overall | No. in season | Title | Original release date | US viewers (millions) |
|---|---|---|---|---|
| 47 | 1 | "That's the Way the Cookie Crumbles" | May 5, 2019 | 1.16 |
| 48 | 2 | "Here Comes the Bride" | May 12, 2019 | 0.96 |
| 49 | 3 | "Hot Mike" | May 19, 2019 | 1.11 |
| 50 | 4 | "The Wig Easy" | May 26, 2019 | 0.89 |
| 51 | 5 | "The Big Easy Show Down" | June 2, 2019 | 1.04 |
| 52 | 6 | "Boundaries, Bayous and Beignets" | June 9, 2019 | 0.91 |
| 53 | 7 | "Salty Behavior" | June 16, 2019 | 1.07 |
| 54 | 8 | "Sex, Lies and Butter Knives" | June 30, 2019 | 0.96 |
| 55 | 9 | "Days of Our Knives" | July 7, 2019 | 1.15 |
| 56 | 10 | "Showdown at the Hoedown" | July 14, 2019 | 1.07 |
| 57 | 11 | "Can I Get a Witness" | July 21, 2019 | 1.02 |
| 58 | 12 | "Good Will Haunting" | July 28, 2019 | 1.07 |
| 59 | 13 | "Opening Old Wounds" | August 4, 2019 | 1.10 |
| 60 | 14 | "Open House and Closed Doors" | August 11, 2019 | 1.04 |
| 61 | 15 | "Cayman We Get Along?" | August 18, 2019 | 1.09 |
| 62 | 16 | "Trouble in Paradise" | August 25, 2019 | 1.01 |
| 63 | 17 | "Unanswered Questions" | September 1, 2019 | 0.90 |
| 64 | 18 | "Mom's the Word" | September 8, 2019 | 1.17 |
| 65 | 19 | "Reunion Part 1" | September 15, 2019 | 1.12 |
| 66 | 20 | "Reunion Part 2" | September 22, 2019 | 1.18 |
| 67 | 21 | "Reunion Part 3" | September 29, 2019 | 1.11 |

=== Season 5 (2020) ===
Wendy Osefo joined the cast.

The Real Housewives of Potomac season 5 episodes
| No. overall | No. in season | Title | Original release date | US viewers (millions) |
|---|---|---|---|---|
| 68 | 1 | "Old Testaments, New Revelations" | August 2, 2020 | 1.06 |
| 69 | 2 | "The Rumor Meal" | August 9, 2020 | 0.87 |
| 70 | 3 | "Sip and See You Later" | August 16, 2020 | 0.97 |
| 71 | 4 | "Celebrations and Strange Explanations" | August 23, 2020 | 0.92 |
| 72 | 5 | "Look Who's Squawking" | August 30, 2020 | 0.91 |
| 73 | 6 | "The Text Heard 'Round the Lake House" | September 6, 2020 | 0.78 |
| 74 | 7 | "Fireball and Firepits" | September 13, 2020 | 1.02 |
| 75 | 8 | "Serving up Betrayals" | September 20, 2020 | 0.98 |
| 76 | 9 | "The Tipping Point" | September 27, 2020 | 1.09 |
| 77 | 10 | "Sorry... Not Sorry" | October 4, 2020 | 1.05 |
| 78 | 11 | "Taxing Times and Blurry Lines" | October 11, 2020 | 1.04 |
| 79 | 12 | "Fully Charged" | October 18, 2020 | 0.93 |
| 80 | 13 | "No Shows and Show Downs" | October 25, 2020 | 1.04 |
| 81 | 14 | "Hats Off... Shades On" | November 1, 2020 | 0.87 |
| 82 | 15 | "Portu-Girl-Bye" | November 8, 2020 | 1.03 |
| 83 | 16 | "Picking Sides" | November 15, 2020 | 1.11 |
| 84 | 17 | "Fifty Shades of Betrayal" | November 22, 2020 | 0.96 |
| 85 | 18 | "Shifty Wigs" | November 29, 2020 | 0.99 |
| 86 | 19 | "Deck the Halls With Drama" | December 6, 2020 | 1.31 |
| 87 | 20 | "Reunion Part 1" | December 13, 2020 | 1.17 |
| 88 | 21 | "Reunion Part 2" | December 20, 2020 | 1.28 |
| 89 | 22 | "Reunion Part 3" | December 27, 2020 | 1.28 |

=== Season 6 (2021) ===
Monique Samuels departed as a series regular. Mia Thornton joined the cast. Askale Davis served in a recurring capacity.

The Real Housewives of Potomac season 6 episodes
| No. overall | No. in season | Title | Original release date | US viewers (millions) |
|---|---|---|---|---|
| 90 | 1 | "The Nude Interlude" | July 11, 2021 | 1.04 |
| 91 | 2 | "Sing Sing for Your Supper" | July 18, 2021 | 0.88 |
| 92 | 3 | "Jiminy Crickets" | July 25, 2021 | 0.89 |
| 93 | 4 | "Going Ham at the Pajammy Jam" | August 1, 2021 | 0.88 |
| 94 | 5 | "The Rumor Mill" | August 8, 2021 | 0.89 |
| 95 | 6 | "Land of the Free, Home of the Shade" | August 15, 2021 | 0.98 |
| 96 | 7 | "Gossip, Girl!" | August 22, 2021 | 1.07 |
| 97 | 8 | "Talk to the Braids" | August 29, 2021 | 1.10 |
| 98 | 9 | "High Infidelity" | September 5, 2021 | 0.88 |
| 99 | 10 | "Goddesses of War" | September 12, 2021 | 1.01 |
| 100 | 11 | "No Business Like Shade Business" | September 19, 2021 | 0.95 |
| 101 | 12 | "Reasonably or Shady?" | September 26, 2021 | 1.00 |
| 102 | 13 | "GVO or GTFO!" | October 3, 2021 | 0.94 |
| 103 | 14 | "Tossing Salad and Spilling Tea (Bags)" | October 10, 2021 | 1.05 |
| 104 | 15 | "Lost at Sea" | October 17, 2021 | 1.07 |
| 105 | 16 | "Crab-Boiling Over" | October 24, 2021 | 1.09 |
| 106 | 17 | "Altar-ed State of Mind" | October 31, 2021 | 1.02 |
| 107 | 18 | "Reunion Part 1" | November 7, 2021 | 1.16 |
| 108 | 19 | "Reunion Part 2" | November 14, 2021 | 1.01 |
| 109 | 20 | "Reunion Part 3" | November 21, 2021 | 0.97 |
| 110 | 21 | "Reunion Part 4: Nicki Minaj Takeover" | November 28, 2021 | 1.02 |
| 111 | 22 | "Secrets Revealed" | December 5, 2021 | 0.45 |

=== Season 7 (2022–2023) ===
Charrisse Jackson-Jordan and Jacqueline Blake served in recurring capacities.

The Real Housewives of Potomac season 7 episodes
| No. overall | No. in season | Title | Original release date | US viewers (millions) |
|---|---|---|---|---|
| 112 | 1 | "Spring Awakening" | October 9, 2022 | 0.79 |
| 113 | 2 | "Allegation Nation" | October 16, 2022 | 0.86 |
| 114 | 3 | "Stand in Your Truth" | October 23, 2022 | 0.91 |
| 115 | 4 | "Not All Fun and Games" | October 30, 2022 | 0.84 |
| 116 | 5 | "The Burn Session" | November 6, 2022 | 0.77 |
| 117 | 6 | "Burnin' and Beefin'" | November 13, 2022 | 0.77 |
| 118 | 7 | "Beef is Served" | November 20, 2022 | 0.81 |
| 119 | 8 | "Queen vs. Queen" | November 27, 2022 | 0.86 |
| 120 | 9 | "Ambush in Paradise" | December 4, 2022 | 1.08 |
| 121 | 10 | "Cleaning Up the Mess" | December 11, 2022 | 0.91 |
| 122 | 11 | "Show Time!" | December 18, 2022 | 0.90 |
| 123 | 12 | "Mic Drop" | January 1, 2023 | 0.76 |
| 124 | 13 | "Sisterhood of the Traveling Beefs" | January 8, 2023 | 0.87 |
| 125 | 14 | "Shake-Ups and Makeups" | January 15, 2023 | 0.83 |
| 126 | 15 | "Indecent Disclosure" | January 22, 2023 | 0.84 |
| 127 | 16 | "The Naked Truth" | January 29, 2023 | 0.87 |
| 128 | 17 | "A Grande Finale" | February 5, 2023 | 0.81 |
| 129 | 18 | "Reunion Part 1" | February 19, 2023 | 0.87 |
| 130 | 19 | "Reunion Part 2" | February 26, 2023 | 0.95 |
| 131 | 20 | "Reunion Part 3" | March 5, 2023 | 0.82 |

=== Season 8 (2023–2024) ===
Nneka Ihim joined the cast. Charrisse Jackson-Jordan and Keiarna Stewart served in recurring capacities.

The Real Housewives of Potomac season 8 episodes
| No. overall | No. in season | Title | Original release date | US viewers (millions) |
|---|---|---|---|---|
| 132 | 1 | "Projections and Deflections" | November 5, 2023 | 0.79 |
| 133 | 2 | "Home Sweet Drama" | November 12, 2023 | 0.76 |
| 134 | 3 | "Heaven Is a Place in Potomac" | November 19, 2023 | 0.73 |
| 135 | 4 | "In a Pickle" | November 26, 2023 | 0.71 |
| 136 | 5 | "Pie in the Austin Sky" | December 3, 2023 | 0.80 |
| 137 | 6 | "Tequila, Tears, Texas" | December 10, 2023 | 0.66 |
| 138 | 7 | "Don't Rock the Boat" | December 17, 2023 | 0.72 |
| 139 | 8 | "Painting Austin Red" | January 7, 2024 | 0.68 |
| 140 | 9 | "Hard Conversations" | January 14, 2024 | 0.68 |
| 141 | 10 | "Friendship Is a Mother" | January 21, 2024 | 0.78 |
| 142 | 11 | "First Come, First Served" | January 28, 2024 | 0.64 |
| 143 | 12 | "Blazed and Confused" | February 4, 2024 | 0.61 |
| 144 | 13 | "Sharing Is Caring" | February 18, 2024 | 0.67 |
| 145 | 14 | "Sun's Out Buns Out" | February 25, 2024 | 0.64 |
| 146 | 15 | "Fool's Gold" | March 3, 2024 | 0.65 |
| 147 | 16 | "Boiling Point" | March 10, 2024 | 0.59 |
| 148 | 17 | "Fashion Show-Down" | March 17, 2024 | 0.61 |
| 149 | 18 | "An Iconic Ending" | March 24, 2024 | 0.71 |
| 150 | 19 | "Reunion Part 1" | March 31, 2024 | 0.72 |
| 151 | 20 | "Reunion Part 2" | April 7, 2024 | 0.82 |
| 152 | 21 | "Reunion Part 3" | April 14, 2024 | 0.79 |

=== Season 9 (2024–2025) ===
Robyn Dixon, Candiace Dillard Bassett and Nneka Ihim departed as series regulars. Keiarna Stewart and Stacey Rusch joined the cast. Jacqueline Blake and Jassi Rideaux served in recurring capacities.

The Real Housewives of Potomac season 9 episodes
| No. overall | No. in season | Title | Original release date | US viewers (millions) |
|---|---|---|---|---|
| 153 | 1 | "A Crash Course in Deflection" | October 6, 2024 | 0.52 |
| 154 | 2 | "Double Trouble" | October 13, 2024 | 0.63 |
| 155 | 3 | "Momma Knows Best" | October 20, 2024 | 0.54 |
| 156 | 4 | "Bunking Beds and Butting Heads" | October 27, 2024 | 0.62 |
| 157 | 5 | "Blast from Everyone's Past" | November 3, 2024 | 0.54 |
| 158 | 6 | "Shady Waters" | November 10, 2024 | 0.54 |
| 159 | 7 | "Hard Launch, Soft Landing" | November 17, 2024 | 0.54 |
| 160 | 8 | "Healing, Thriving and Surviving" | November 24, 2024 | 0.56 |
| 161 | 9 | "Mediation Nation" | December 1, 2024 | 0.62 |
| 162 | 10 | "Love in the Fast Lane" | December 8, 2024 | 0.63 |
| 163 | 11 | "Secrets of the Love Lagoon" | December 15, 2024 | 0.55 |
| 164 | 12 | "Shake the Devil Off" | December 22, 2024 | 0.53 |
| 165 | 13 | "Rum-ble in the Jungle" | January 5, 2025 | 0.59 |
| 166 | 14 | "Red, White and Smooch" | January 12, 2025 | 0.48 |
| 167 | 15 | "Old Rumors, Die Hard" | January 19, 2025 | 0.53 |
| 168 | 16 | "The Truth Will Set You Off" | January 26, 2025 | 0.59 |
| 169 | 17 | "All Bark, No Bite" | February 2, 2025 | 0.60 |
| 170 | 18 | "Reunion Part 1" | February 16, 2025 | 0.62 |
| 171 | 19 | "Reunion Part 2" | February 23, 2025 | 0.66 |
| 172 | 20 | "Reunion Part 3" | March 2, 2025 | 0.65 |

=== Season 10 (2025–2026) ===
Karen Huger and Mia Thornton departed as series regulars. Tia Glover and Angel Massie joined the cast. Monique Samuels and Jassi Rideaux served in recurring capacities.

The Real Housewives of Potomac season 10 episodes
| No. overall | No. in season | Title | Original release date | U.S. viewers (millions) |
|---|---|---|---|---|
| 173 | 1 | "Second Bloom" | October 5, 2025 | 0.43 |
| 174 | 2 | "Mint to Be Shady" | October 12, 2025 | 0.45 |
| 175 | 3 | "Chin Checked" | October 19, 2025 | 0.50 |
| 176 | 4 | "Tropic Like It's Hot" | October 26, 2025 | 0.53 |
| 177 | 5 | "Sunshine and Sexts" | November 2, 2025 | 0.43 |
| 178 | 6 | "Suns Out, Buns Out" | November 9, 2025 | 0.49 |
| 179 | 7 | "Guess Who's Back?" | November 16, 2025 | 0.42 |
| 180 | 8 | "Pride and Pettiness" | November 23, 2025 | 0.42 |
| 181 | 9 | "Leak What You Speak" | November 30, 2025 | 0.52 |
| 182 | 10 | "Blunt Truths" | December 7, 2025 | 0.52 |
| 183 | 11 | "Lease Is Up, Giddy Up" | December 14, 2025 | 0.47 |
| 184 | 12 | "Potomac and Ponies and Problems" | December 21, 2025 | 0.50 |
| 185 | 13 | "Altitude with Attitude" | January 4, 2026 | 0.42 |
| 186 | 14 | "High and Dry" | January 11, 2026 | 0.48 |
| 187 | 15 | "The Rocky Road to Sisterhood" | January 18, 2026 | 0.56 |
| 188 | 16 | "Driving on Empty" | January 25, 2026 | 0.50 |
| 189 | 17 | "Karen Comes Home" | February 1, 2026 | 0.76 |
| 190 | 18 | "Reunion Part 1" | February 15, 2026 | 0.72 |
| 191 | 19 | "Reunion Part 2" | February 22, 2026 | 0.79 |
| 192 | 20 | "Reunion Part 3" | March 1, 2026 | 0.73 |

=== Season 11 (2026) ===
Keiarna Stewart and Angel Massie departed as series regulars. Karen Huger rejoined the cast as a series regular. Courtney Ajinça joined the cast. Robyn Dixon and Monique Samuels served in recurring capacities.

The Real Housewives of Potomac season 11 episodes
| No. overall | No. in season | Title | Rating (18–49) | Original release date | U.S. viewers (millions) |
|---|---|---|---|---|---|
| 193 | 1 | "Read Between the Lies" | TBA | October 11, 2026 | N/A |
| 194 | 2 | "Sofia Home!" | TBA | October 18, 2026 | N/A |
| 195 | 3 | "She Said, She Said" | TBA | October 25, 2026 | TBD |
| 196 | 4 | "Tough Love" | TBA | November 1, 2026 | TBD |
| 197 | 5 | "Shady Beaches" | TBA | November 8, 2026 | TBD |
| 198 | 6 | "Something in the Water" | TBA | November 15, 2026 | TBD |
| 199 | 7 | TBA | TBA | November 22, 2026 | TBD |
| 200 | 8 | TBA | TBA | November 29, 2026 | TBD |
| 201 | 9 | TBA | TBA | December 6, 2026 | TBD |
