= The Real Housewives of Potomac season 4 =

The Real Housewives of Potomac
- Season 4
- Cover used by the iTunes Store
- Starring: Gizelle Bryant; Ashley Darby; Robyn Dixon; Karen Huger; Monique Samuels; Candiace Dillard Bassett
- No. of episodes: 21

Release
- Original network: Bravo
- Original release: May 5 – September 29, 2019

Season chronology
- ← Previous; Season 3 Next → Season 5

The fourth season of The Real Housewives of Potomac, an American reality television series, was broadcast on Bravo. It premiered on May 5, 2019, and is primarily filmed in Potomac, Maryland. Its executive producers are Steven Weinstock, Glenda Hersh, Lauren Eskelin, Lorraine Haughton-Lawson, Thomas Kelly and Andy Cohen.

The fourth season of The Real Housewives of Potomac focuses on the lives of Gizelle Bryant, Ashley Darby, Robyn Dixon, Karen Huger, Monique Samuels and Candiace Dillard Bassett.

The season was acclaimed by fans of the Bravo franchise with many fans deeming it one of the best seasons of Housewives of all time.

== Cast and synopsis ==
All six housewives featured during the third season returned as housewives, with Katie Rost—who previously appeared as a housewife during the first season—returning in a recurring capacity.

== Episodes ==
The Real Housewives of Potomac season 4 episodes
No. overall	No. in season	Title	Original release date	US viewers (millions)
47	1	"That's the Way the Cookie Crumbles"	May 5, 2019	1.16
48	2	"Here Comes the Bride"	May 12, 2019	0.96
49	3	"Hot Mike"	May 19, 2019	1.11
50	4	"The Wig Easy"	May 26, 2019	0.89
51	5	"The Big Easy Show Down"	June 2, 2019	1.04
52	6	"Boundaries, Bayous and Beignets"	June 9, 2019	0.91
53	7	"Salty Behavior"	June 16, 2019	1.07
54	8	"Sex, Lies and Butter Knives"	June 30, 2019	0.96
55	9	"Days of Our Knives"	July 7, 2019	1.15
56	10	"Showdown at the Hoedown"	July 14, 2019	1.07
57	11	"Can I Get a Witness"	July 21, 2019	1.02
58	12	"Good Will Haunting"	July 28, 2019	1.07
59	13	"Opening Old Wounds"	August 4, 2019	1.10
60	14	"Open House and Closed Doors"	August 11, 2019	1.04
61	15	"Cayman We Get Along?"	August 18, 2019	1.09
62	16	"Trouble in Paradise"	August 25, 2019	1.01
63	17	"Unanswered Questions"	September 1, 2019	0.90
64	18	"Mom's the Word"	September 8, 2019	1.17
65	19	"Reunion Part 1"	September 15, 2019	1.12
66	20	"Reunion Part 2"	September 22, 2019	1.18
67	21	"Reunion Part 3"	September 29, 2019	1.11
