= The Real Housewives of Potomac season 9 =

The Real Housewives of Potomac
- Season 9
- Promotional poster
- Starring: Gizelle Bryant; Ashley Darby; Karen Huger; Wendy Osefo; Mia Thornton; Stacey Rusch; Keiarna Stewart
- No. of episodes: 20

Release
- Original network: Bravo
- Original release: October 6, 2024 – March 2, 2025

Season chronology
- ← Previous; Season 8 Next → Season 10

The ninth season of The Real Housewives of Potomac, an American reality television series, was broadcast on Bravo. It premiered on October 6, 2024, and concluded on March 2, 2025. It was primarily filmed in Potomac, Maryland. The season's executive producers were Steven Weinstock, Glenda Hersh, Lauren Eskelin, Lorraine Haughton-Lawson, Nora Devin Zimmerman, Leola Westbrook-Lawrence and Andy Cohen.

The season focuses on the personal and professional lives of Gizelle Bryant, Ashley Darby, Karen Huger, Wendy Osefo, Mia Thornton, Stacey Rusch and Keiarna Stewart, with Jacqueline Blake and Jassi Rideaux appearing as friends of the housewives.

This season marked the first departure of original Housewife Karen Huger following her 2025 sentencing for her DUI crash in the previous year. She eventually returned for the show's eleventh season. It also marked the final appearance of Mia Thornton.

== Cast ==
Following the conclusion of the show's eighth season, cast members Candiace Dillard Bassett, Robyn Dixon and Nneka Ihim announced they would not be returning to the series for its ninth season. In September 2024, it was announced that the ninth season of the series would premiere on October 6, 2024. Gizelle Bryant, Ashley Darby, Karen Huger, Wendy Osefo, Mia Thornton and former friend of the housewives Keiarna Stewart (now in a full-time role) all returned alongside new housewife Stacey Rusch. Jacqueline Blake and new cast member Jassi Rideaux also appeared in the ninth season as friends of the housewives.

== Production ==
Filming for the ninth season began in late April 2024 and concluded in August 2024. The Real Housewives of Potomac is produced by Truly Original for Bravo. Steven Weinstock, Glenda Hersh, Lauren Eskelin, Lorraine Haughton-Lawson, Nora Devin Zimmerman, Leola Westbrook-Lawrence, and Andy Cohen are recognized as the series' executive producers. Jackie Hebert, Nick Prescott and EJ Dutton serve as co-executive producers.

The ninth season's reunion was filmed on January 9, 2025, in New York City. Huger was not in attendance due to her entering an alcohol rehabilitation program after she was found guilty of driving under the influence in December 2024.

== Episodes ==
The Real Housewives of Potomac season 9 episodes
No. overall	No. in season	Title	Original release date	US viewers (millions)
153	1	"A Crash Course in Deflection"	October 6, 2024	0.52
154	2	"Double Trouble"	October 13, 2024	0.63
155	3	"Momma Knows Best"	October 20, 2024	0.54
156	4	"Bunking Beds and Butting Heads"	October 27, 2024	0.62
157	5	"Blast from Everyone's Past"	November 3, 2024	0.54
158	6	"Shady Waters"	November 10, 2024	0.54
159	7	"Hard Launch, Soft Landing"	November 17, 2024	0.54
160	8	"Healing, Thriving and Surviving"	November 24, 2024	0.56
161	9	"Mediation Nation"	December 1, 2024	0.62
162	10	"Love in the Fast Lane"	December 8, 2024	0.63
163	11	"Secrets of the Love Lagoon"	December 15, 2024	0.55
164	12	"Shake the Devil Off"	December 22, 2024	0.53
165	13	"Rum-ble in the Jungle"	January 5, 2025	0.59
166	14	"Red, White and Smooch"	January 12, 2025	0.48
167	15	"Old Rumors, Die Hard"	January 19, 2025	0.53
168	16	"The Truth Will Set You Off"	January 26, 2025	0.59
169	17	"All Bark, No Bite"	February 2, 2025	0.60
170	18	"Reunion Part 1"	February 16, 2025	0.62
171	19	"Reunion Part 2"	February 23, 2025	0.66
172	20	"Reunion Part 3"	March 2, 2025	0.65
