= The Real Housewives of Potomac season 5 =

The Real Housewives of Potomac
- Season 5
- Cover used by the iTunes Store; Left to right: Osefo, Dixon, Dillard Bassett, Huger, Bryant, Darby and Samuels
- Starring: Gizelle Bryant; Ashley Darby; Robyn Dixon; Karen Huger; Monique Samuels; Candiace Dillard Bassett; Wendy Osefo
- No. of episodes: 22

Release
- Original network: Bravo
- Original release: August 2 – December 27, 2020

Season chronology
- ← Previous; Season 4 Next → Season 6

The fifth season of The Real Housewives of Potomac, an American reality television series, is broadcast on Bravo. It aired from August 2 to December 27, 2020, and is primarily filmed in Potomac, Maryland. Its executive producers are Steven Weinstock, Glenda Hersh, Lauren Eskelin, Lorraine Haughton-Lawson, Thomas Kelly and Andy Cohen. The season focuses on the lives of Gizelle Bryant, Ashley Darby, Robyn Dixon, Karen Huger, Monique Samuels, Candiace Dillard Bassett and Wendy Osefo.

This season marked the final regular appearance of Monique Samuels.

== Cast and synopsis ==
In November 2019, reports were published of a physical altercation between housewives Candiace Dillard and Monique Samuels, while filming for the fifth season. As a result, charges were filed and subsequently dropped against both Dillard and Samuels.

In March 2020, it was announced the series would return May 3, 2020, with the cast of the fourth season returning, and Wendy Osefo joining as the newest housewife. Following the COVID-19 pandemic in the United States, Bravo pulled the premiere and later announced the season to premiere on August 2, 2020. The season also featured a guest appearance from original housewife, Charrisse Jackson Jordan.

On December 27, 2020, following the season finale, Samuels announced her departure from the franchise. She stated: "It was a crazy ride. It's not easy doing reality TV, and to be quite honest, I'm over it. I appreciate everything people have done for me, everybody that has been Team Monique, I love y'all, I thank y'all. But when you cross certain lines, there's no going back. For me, my family is that line. The opinion of my family and my kids and what they think about anything that I do is more valuable to me than anybody's opinion, so I'm over it."

== Episodes ==
The Real Housewives of Potomac season 5 episodes
No. overall	No. in season	Title	Original release date	US viewers (millions)
68	1	"Old Testaments, New Revelations"	August 2, 2020	1.06
The fifth season premiere sees Gizelle Bryant reconnecting with her ex-husband, Jamal Bryant. Elsewhere, as Ashley Darby struggles adjusting to being a new mom, Karen Huger and her husband Ray suffer a disconnection in their marriage; elsewhere, Monique Samuels confronts an old frenemy as Wendy Osefo is introduced to the ladies
69	2	"The Rumor Meal"	August 9, 2020	0.87
Ashley Darby continues to fear going out of the house, Gizelle Bryant and Monique Samuels decide to put aside their differences and collaborate on a dinner in support of Darby. However, Samuels begins to question her decision upon hearing of Candiace Dillard's newly formed alliance with an old foe.
70	3	"Sip and See You Later"	August 16, 2020	0.97
When Gizelle Bryant spends her birthday with her daughters and ex-husband Jamal Bryant, tensions begin to create awkwardness between the couple. Despite their recent reconciliation, Candiace Dillard struggles to understand Monique Samuels' recent anger towards her.
71	4	"Celebrations and Strange Explanations"	August 23, 2020	0.92
When Monique Samuels expresses to her husband, Chris Samuels, about the weight on her shoulders as a wife, Gizelle Bryant hears from her daughters about their thoughts of her reconciliation with their father. Elsewhere, Karen Huger hosts a housewarming celebration; Candiace Dillard and Ashley Darby come to terms with their differences.
72	5	"Look Who's Squawking"	August 30, 2020	0.91
When Monique Samuels invited the ladies to her lake house, they are met with an unexpected guest. While there, Karen Huger expresses her dislike for Wendy Osefo's obsession with her sex life.
73	6	"The Text Heard 'Round the Lake House"	September 6, 2020	0.78
While at Monique Samuels' lake house, the ladies host a pageant as a way to pass the time. While there, Ashley Darby and Wendy Osefo make amends; when Candiace Dillard receives a text message concerning Darby's husband, she wonders if she should reveal the contents or not.
74	7	"Fireball and Firepits"	September 13, 2020	1.02
During an event with some of the ladies, Karen Huger gets honest about her marriage. When the husbands join the wives at the lake house, Candiace Dillard reveals Michael Darby's alleged indiscretions to Ashley Darby.
75	8	"Serving up Betrayals"	September 20, 2020	0.98
Faced with blog rumors, Ashley Darby goes to Michael Darby for the truth. To celebrate her literary award, Gizelle Bryant brings the ladies together for a wine tasting; while there, tensions arise, leading to a heated confrontation.
76	9	"The Tipping Point"	September 27, 2020	1.09
In the aftermath of the altercation between Candiace Dillard and Monique Samuels, the other women are left to make sense of the events. While Gizelle Bryant travels to Atlanta for her opening of her daughter's restaurant, Ashley Darby presents her husband with a post-nuptial agreement.
77	10	"Sorry... Not Sorry"	October 4, 2020	1.05
Following the events at the winery, Karen Huger hosts the ladies to hear Monique Samuels' side of the altercation between her and Candiace Dillard.
78	11	"Taxing Times and Blurry Lines"	October 11, 2020	1.04
To celebrate her homecoming in Virginia, Karen Huger invites Gizelle Bryant and Ashley Darby to attend; during the trip, an emotional visit to Huger's childhood farm shows the women a different side to her. Back in Potomac, while Robyn Dixon's tax troubles become public, Candiace Dillard contemplates filing charges against Monique Samuels following the assault at the winery.
79	12	"Fully Charged"	October 18, 2020	0.93
When Edward and Wendy Osefo host a sip and see for their daughter, Wendy invites Edward's estranged parents to the event. Ashley and Michael Darby attend marriage counseling, while Karen Huger fights for her marriage. Candiace Dillard makes the decision to take legal action against Monique Samuels.
80	13	"No Shows and Show Downs"	October 25, 2020	1.04
Following the incident at the winery, Monique Samuels begins to feel as lack of support from the other housewives. Gizelle and Jamal Bryant experience struggles with their long-distance relationship, while Wendy Osefo hosts an evening with wine and politics.
81	14	"Hats Off... Shades On"	November 1, 2020	0.87
After Candiace Dillard files a lawsuit against Monique Samuels regarding the incident at the winery, Samuels counter-files against Dillard. For her hat line, Robyn Dixon hosts a photoshoot, and Ashley Darby tries to find happiness.
82	15	"Portu-Girl-Bye"	November 8, 2020	1.03
The women are preparing to go to Portugal, where Ashley Darby is beginning to express her desire to return home. Karen Huger begins to question Gizelle Bryant over the state of her relationship, which not only leads to a heated discussion, but with Robyn Dixon also agreeing with Huger's point-of-view.
83	16	"Picking Sides"	November 15, 2020	1.11
As the housewives play a prank on Wendy Osefo, Gizelle Bryant struggles to keep a secret she has. While on their trip in Portugal, Karen Huger opens up to the women about her marriage.
84	17	"Fifty Shades of Betrayal"	November 22, 2020	0.96
When Robyn Dixon reveals the images of the housewives on her website for Embellished, the results causes tension for some of the ladies. At a dominiatrix party, hosted by Gizelle Bryant and Ashley Darby, past tensions return when Darby reveals she wrote a letter in Monique Samuels' defense against Candiace Dillard.
85	18	"Shifty Wigs"	November 29, 2020	0.99
While Gizelle Bryant plans a family photoshoot, Wendy Osefo decides she wants to quit teaching, but struggles with revealing this choice to her mother. Karen Huger hosts a party in celebration of her new wig line.
86	19	"Deck the Halls With Drama"	December 6, 2020	1.31
As Juan and Robyn Dixon pursue couples therapy, Gizelle Bryant makes sure that Robyn's engagement goes smoothly. Upset over Karen Huger setting her up, Candiace Dillard decides to confront her.
87	20	"Reunion Part 1"	December 13, 2020	1.17
The reunion begins Monique Samuels and Candiace Dillard meet for the first time since their physical altercation. Wendy Osefo reflects on her first season, while Dillard and Ashley Darby, and, Gizelle Bryant, Karen Huger and Samuels engage in separate arguments.
88	21	"Reunion Part 2"	December 20, 2020	1.28
The reunion continues as Monique Samuels and Candiace Dillard revisit their conflict of the season. Karen Huger is confronted by the other ladies over her loyalty. As Ashley Darby clears the air about Michael Darby and the allegations against him, she makes a revelation which shocks the housewives.
89	22	"Reunion Part 3"	December 27, 2020	1.28
The reunion ends as the husbands join their spouses, where Chris Bassett and Chris Samuels begin a heated exchange. As Karen and Ray Huger discuss the current state of their marriage, Ray makes an announcement. When questioned about her wedding plans to Juan Dixon, Robyn Dixon shares her thoughts on where they stand.
