= The Real Housewives of Potomac season 3 =

The Real Housewives of Potomac
- Season 3
- Cover used by the iTunes Store; Left to right: Dixon, Samuels, Huger, Bryant, Darby and Dillard
- Starring: Gizelle Bryant; Ashley Darby; Robyn Dixon; Karen Huger; Monique Samuels; Candiace Dillard
- No. of episodes: 20

Release
- Original network: Bravo
- Original release: April 1 – August 19, 2018

Season chronology
- ← Previous; Season 2 Next → Season 4

The third season of The Real Housewives of Potomac, an American reality television series, is broadcast on Bravo. It premiered on April 1, 2018, and is primarily filmed in Potomac, Maryland. Its executive producers are Steven Weinstock, Glenda Hersh, Lauren Eskelin, Lorraine Haughton-Lawson, Thomas Kelly, and Andy Cohen.

The third season of The Real Housewives of Potomac focuses on the lives of Gizelle Bryant, Ashley Darby, Robyn Dixon, Karen Huger, Monique Samuels and Candiace Dillard.

== Cast and synopsis ==
All six housewives featured during the second season returned, however, original housewife Charrisse Jackson-Jordan returned in a recurring capacity. Candiace Dillard, a former Miss United States, joined the series as a full-time housewife.

This season saw Karen deal with endless questions from the other ladies around her husband's company's tax issues detailed in the press. Her constant deflecting leads to tensions in her friendships with Gizelle and Ashley. Meanwhile, Gizelle deals with her relationship with Sherman and whether he's ready to commit long-term.

Monique struggles with balancing home life and her ever growing commitments outside of her marriage, including starting up her new lifestyle website for moms. Following a car accident, rumours between the group spread about her drinking habits. This causes conflict between Monique and Robyn who feels the former is making unprovoked attacks. Robyn continues to work on her relationship with ex-husband Juan.

Following a trial separation, Ashley and Michael move back in together as they try to rebuild their marriage. They face continuing problems as Ashley's mother and the financial help she receives from them, divides the couple.

Newcomer Candiace is focused on planning her upcoming wedding, dealing with an overbearing mother whilst trying to form friendships with the other ladies. Whilst Karen takes her under wing, she struggles connecting with the others.

== Episodes ==
The Real Housewives of Potomac season 3 episodes
| No. overall | No. in season | Title | Original release date | US viewers (millions) |
|---|---|---|---|---|
| 27 | 1 | "You Gotta Make Millions to Owe Millions" | April 1, 2018 | 1.18 |
Finally residents of 20854, Monique and Chris adjust to their new Potomac neighborhood. After months of living apart from Michael, Ashley decides it's time to give her marriage another shot, influenced by sage advice from newly-in-love Gizelle. Karen and Ray become the talk of Potomac after a shocking headline in The Washington Post. And things get heated between Karen and Robyn after a huge breach of trust.
| 28 | 2 | "Meet the Press" | April 8, 2018 | 1.23 |
Robyn and Juan upgrade their lives by moving to a new condo; Gizelle takes her new boyfriend on a romantic picnic; feeling betrayed by her friends, Karen holds a "press conference" to answer their questions regarding her financial situation.
| 29 | 3 | "Meme Your Own Business" | April 15, 2018 | 1.20 |
Michael pressures Ashley to cut financial ties with her mother; Robyn and Juan get acclimated in their new home; Monique throws Chris a 40th birthday party; a three-way fight between Robyn, Ashley, and Monique gets out of hand.
| 30 | 4 | "First Ladies and Second Chances" | April 22, 2018 | 1.15 |
Gizelle decides to write a book; Monique and Robyn try to get to the root of their issues; Candiace hopes to step out from her mother's shadow; Ashley seeks the advice of a therapist and tries to choose between her husband and her mother.
| 31 | 5 | "Shades in a Bubble" | April 29, 2018 | 1.04 |
Ashley invites Gizelle and Candiace to yoga; Karen sends her daughter off to college; Robyn continues to settle into her new home; Candiace invites the ladies to Bubble Soccer, but things go from playful to personal as the ladies interrogate her.
| 32 | 6 | "I Came from Jesus" | May 6, 2018 | 1.20 |
Monique has a car accident that leaves everyone concerned; Karen embraces her entrepreneurial spirit; Ashley plans a fun retreat for the ladies, but things take a surprising turn as two of the women challenge Candiace when she stands up for herself.
| 33 | 7 | "Blue Skies and Blue Eyes" | May 13, 2018 | 0.97 |
The women continue their weekend escape; Karen starts hurling insults at Robyn, leaving everyone confused; the women enjoy an afternoon of fishing; tensions arise as allegations swirl over Monique's denials and Karen's possible secrets.
| 34 | 8 | "That's Scentertainment" | May 20, 2018 | 1.05 |
Gizelle worries about the status of her relationship; Ashley is faced with the daunting task of moving her mother out of her house; Candiace struggles for independence; Karen hosts a Scent event, during which Monique confronts Ashley about a rumor.
| 35 | 9 | "A Happy Medium" | May 27, 2018 | 1.01 |
Candiace decides to face her fears; Monique organizes a donation drive for Hurricane Harvey victims; an emotion Gizelle breaks down over her relationship; Robyn and Juan seek closure, but a visit from loved ones leaves the couple in extreme shock.
| 36 | 10 | "RSVPlease!" | June 3, 2018 | 1.14 |
Candiace attempts to persuade her mother to give her control over the family business; Ashley and Michael revisit their prenuptial agreement; Monique and Robyn host two different events on the same day; Gizelle receives advice.
| 37 | 11 | "Ex's and Oh No's" | June 10, 2018 | 1.07 |
Having one extra ticket to her gala, Monique decides to invite an unlikely guest to sit at her table; baby talk puts another roadblock in Ashley and Michael's relationship; finding a wedding venue creates tension between Candiace and Chris.
| 38 | 12 | "Can't Hide from These Green Eyes" | June 17, 2018 | 1.16 |
Ashley must face the truth about why Michael is hesitant to have more children; Robyn confronts Karen about her lies in a public forum; Charrisse is left questioning her friendship with Monique; Candiace is stressed from wedding planning.
| 39 | 13 | "Mime Your Own Business" | July 1, 2018 | 0.90 |
Candiace and Chris get marriage insurance in the form of a pre-nup; Ashley decides to give Michael a surprise; Karen and Gizelle try to work things out over lunch; tired of all the fighting, Monique decides to plan a trip to France.
| 40 | 14 | "Cannes We All Just Get Along" | July 8, 2018 | 0.88 |
As the ladies travel to the beautiful South of France for a relaxing vacation on the French Riviera, Gizelle and Robyn clash over their accommodations; Monique opens up about her marriage; Ashley questions Karen's living situation.
| 41 | 15 | "Turm-Oil in France" | July 15, 2018 | 1.04 |
As the ladies enjoy a wonderful day on the French Riviera, Candiace feels left out. Monique and Charrisse's friendship is put to the test, leading to a revelation that stuns everyone.
| 42 | 16 | "Au Revoir Drama" | July 22, 2018 | 0.97 |
While the ladies celebrate Monique's birthday with a fabulous night of burlesque, Candiace finally uses her vocals to win the women over. Ashley and Karen exchange heated words and accusations regarding Karen's marriage.
| 43 | 17 | "Hot Gossip, Cold Pizza" | July 29, 2018 | 0.86 |
Karen meets with her assistant Matt to find out his involvement in the alleged rumors regarding her living situation. Ashley finally comes clean to her mother about some of Michael's inflammatory comments, causing more tension between the two. Determined to find out the truth about whether Karen really lives in her house, Gizelle, Robyn, and Ashley plan a scheme of epic proportions.
| 44 | 18 | "Unsolved Mystery" | August 5, 2018 | 1.03 |
Ashley finally gives Michael an ultimatum on having a baby and reality starts to set in for Candiace that she is about to be an instant stepmother. Robyn throws a birthday party for her youngest son; a new family member makes a special appearance.
| 45 | 19 | "Reunion Part 1" | August 12, 2018 | 1.07 |
The women revisit this season's emotional highs and lows while trying to mend their fractured friendships. Monique and Robyn get to the core of their rivalry; Candiace reveals intimate details about her relationship; Karen sheds light on her life.
| 46 | 20 | "Reunion Part 2" | August 19, 2018 | 1.04 |
The husbands join the women on the stage; Karen goes after Michael; Ray explains the rumors about his wife's infidelity; Gizelle opens up about the "new" man in her life; Ashley reveals big news about her relationship with Michael.
