= The Real Housewives of Potomac season 7 =

The Real Housewives of Potomac
- Season 7
- Cover used by the iTunes Store; From left to right: Thornton, Bryant, Dillard Bassett, Huger, Darby, Dixon and Osefo.
- Starring: Gizelle Bryant; Ashley Darby; Robyn Dixon; Karen Huger; Candiace Dillard Bassett; Wendy Osefo; Mia Thornton
- No. of episodes: 20

Release
- Original network: Bravo
- Original release: October 9, 2022 – March 5, 2023

Season chronology
- ← Previous; Season 6 Next → Season 8

The seventh season of The Real Housewives of Potomac, an American reality television series, is broadcast on Bravo. It premiered on October 9, 2022, and is primarily filmed in Potomac, Maryland. Its executive producers are Steven Weinstock, Glenda Hersh, Lauren Eskelin, Lorraine Haughton-Lawson, Nora Devin, Eric Fuller, and Andy Cohen.

== Cast and synopsis ==
The season focuses on the lives of Gizelle Bryant, Ashley Darby, Robyn Dixon, Karen Huger, Candiace Dillard Bassett, Wendy Osefo and Mia Thornton. Former housewife Charrisse Jackson-Jordan and new cast member Jacqueline Blake appear as "Friends of the Housewives".

== Episodes ==
The Real Housewives of Potomac season 7 episodes
No. overall	No. in season	Title	Original release date	US viewers (millions)
112	1	"Spring Awakening"	October 9, 2022	0.79
113	2	"Allegation Nation"	October 16, 2022	0.86
114	3	"Stand in Your Truth"	October 23, 2022	0.91
115	4	"Not All Fun and Games"	October 30, 2022	0.84
116	5	"The Burn Session"	November 6, 2022	0.77
117	6	"Burnin' and Beefin'"	November 13, 2022	0.77
118	7	"Beef is Served"	November 20, 2022	0.81
119	8	"Queen vs. Queen"	November 27, 2022	0.86
120	9	"Ambush in Paradise"	December 4, 2022	1.08
121	10	"Cleaning Up the Mess"	December 11, 2022	0.91
122	11	"Show Time!"	December 18, 2022	0.90
123	12	"Mic Drop"	January 1, 2023	0.76
124	13	"Sisterhood of the Traveling Beefs"	January 8, 2023	0.87
125	14	"Shake-Ups and Makeups"	January 15, 2023	0.83
126	15	"Indecent Disclosure"	January 22, 2023	0.84
127	16	"The Naked Truth"	January 29, 2023	0.87
128	17	"A Grande Finale"	February 5, 2023	0.81
129	18	"Reunion Part 1"	February 19, 2023	0.87
130	19	"Reunion Part 2"	February 26, 2023	0.95
131	20	"Reunion Part 3"	March 5, 2023	0.82
