= The Real Housewives of Potomac season 2 =

The Real Housewives of Potomac
- Season 2
- Cover used by the iTunes Store; Clockwise: Bryant, Samuels, Huger, Jackson-Jordan, Dixon and Darby
- Starring: Gizelle Bryant; Ashley Darby; Robyn Dixon; Karen Huger; Charrisse Jackson Jordan; Monique Samuels
- No. of episodes: 14

Release
- Original network: Bravo
- Original release: April 2 – July 16, 2017

Season chronology
- ← Previous; Season 1 Next → Season 3

The second season of The Real Housewives of Potomac, an American reality television series, is broadcast on Bravo. It premiered on April 2, 2017, and is primarily filmed in Potomac, Maryland. Its executive producers are Steven Weinstock, Glenda Hersh, Lauren Eskelin, Lorraine Haughton-Lawson, Bianca Barnes-Williams, Ashley McFarlin Buie, and Andy Cohen.

The second season of The Real Housewives of Potomac focuses on the lives of Gizelle Bryant, Ashley Darby, Robyn Dixon, Karen Huger, Charrisse Jackson Jordan and Monique Samuels.

This season marked the final regular appearance of Charrisse Jackson-Jordan.

== Cast and synopsis ==
After filming for the second season had begun Katie Rost, who was a member of the cast in the first season, was fired from the show. Monique Samuels was then added to the cast for the second season.

== Episodes ==
The Real Housewives of Potomac season 2 episodes
No. overall	No. in season	Title	Original release date	US viewers (millions)
13	1	"Don't Let the Zip Code Fool Ya"	April 2, 2017	1.60
14	2	"All Tea, All Shade"	April 9, 2017	1.76
15	3	"Hold Your Horses"	April 16, 2017	1.62
16	4	"Mother Knows Best"	April 23, 2017	1.81
17	5	"Kick the Trick Out"	April 30, 2017	1.79
18	6	"Messy Games"	May 7, 2017	1.77
19	7	"Over the River and Thru the Woods"	May 21, 2017	1.07
20	8	"War of the Darbys"	May 28, 2017	1.03
21	9	"A Host of Issues"	June 4, 2017	1.10
22	10	"Welcome to the Bermuda Triangle"	June 11, 2017	1.18
23	11	"The Grand Dame Sham"	June 18, 2017	1.21
24	12	"Home Is Where the Truth Is"	July 2, 2017	1.09
25	13	"Reunion Part One"	July 9, 2017	1.17
26	14	"Reunion Part Two"	July 16, 2017	1.38
