= The Real Housewives of Potomac season 1 =

The Real Housewives of Potomac
- Season 1
- Poster used by Bravo (Left to right) Dixon, Jackson-Jordan, Huger, Bryant, Rost and Darby
- Starring: Gizelle Bryant; Ashley Darby; Robyn Dixon; Karen Huger; Charrisse Jackson-Jordan; Katie Rost
- No. of episodes: 12

Release
- Original network: Bravo
- Original release: January 17 – April 17, 2016

Season chronology
- Next → Season 2

The first season of The Real Housewives of Potomac, an American reality television series, was broadcast on Bravo. It aired from January 17, 2016 until April 17, 2016, and was primarily filmed in Potomac, Maryland. Its executive producers are Ashley McFarlin Buie, Bianca Barnes-Williams, Glenda Hersh, Lauren Eskelin, Steven Weinstock, Lorraine Haughton-Lawson and Andy Cohen.

The Real Housewives of Potomac focuses on the lives of Gizelle Bryant, Ashley Darby, Robyn Dixon, Karen Huger, Charrisse Jackson-Jordan and Katie Rost. It consisted of twelve episodes.

This season marked the final regular appearance of Katie Rost.

== Production and crew ==
The Real Housewives of Potomac was announced on November 11, 2015. The reality series was initially titled Potomac Ensemble, before being announced as part of The Real Housewives franchise. The show is the eighth installment of The Real Housewives, following The Real Housewives of Orange County, New York City, Atlanta, New Jersey, D.C., Beverly Hills and Miami. "The Real Housewives has become a global phenomenon that drives cultural conversation while consistently breaking ratings records,” said Shari Levine, executive vice president of the network. "We're happy to extend the franchise with Potomac [...] giving Bravo fans more of what they desire: stories of dynamic women who make us laugh, cry, cheer and experience unforgettable moments we can’t stop talking about," she also added following the series announcement. The series follows 6 women living in Potomac, Maryland, a suburb of D.C. and one of the most affluent towns in the United States. The series is the network's second attempt to develop a reality series based in the D.C. area; the first was The Real Housewives of D.C. which aired in 2010 but was canceled after one season. Cohen commented on the decision saying that the cast of the Potomac series is more suitable for a reality series describing it as "all Bravo and no CNN", also adding that the show is "staying far away from the political drama," in contrast to The Real Housewives of D.C.

The season premiered with "Mind Your Manners" on January 17, 2016, while the tenth episode "Rules of Enragement" served as the season finale, and was aired on April 3, 2016. It was followed by two-part reunion April 10 and April 17, 2016, which marked the conclusion of the season. Lauren Eskelin, Lorraine Haughton, Glenda Hersh, Carlos King, Steven Weinstock and Andy Cohen are recognized as the series' executive producers; it is produced and distributed by True Entertainment, an American subsidiary of the Dutch corporation Endemol.

Production encountered some unfavorable reception, when it was discovered that only two Real Housewives actually lived in Potomac, with the rest living in surrounding cities.

== Cast and synopsis ==
Six housewives were featured during the first season of The Real Housewives of Potomac, which iTunes describes as women "whom have fought for their places in this society by way of legacy or marriage". Ashley made her series debut in episode 2, "Divas, Queens, and Bubalas".

Ashley Darby is a former Miss District of Columbia. After moving to Potomac, Ashley is determined to infiltrate the prestigious society and make a name for herself. Ashley and her husband, Michael Darby, take steps to open their own Australian themed restaurant with an emphasis on fresh and wholesome ingredients. As a stepmother to Michael's kids, a 21-year-old and a 24-year-old, Ashley longs to have a child of her own.

Charrisse Jackson Jordan is a socialite in the Potomac community as well as a dedicated wife to NBA player-turned-coach Eddie Jordan. She is also the mother to two teenagers, Jackson, 17, and Skylar, 15. Charrisse has raised millions of dollars for many charity-based organizations and is dedicated to giving back. Organizations Charrisse has been affiliated with include, President of Behind the Bench, the National Basketball Wives Association, Knock Out Abuse Against Women, Men Against Breast Cancer and N Street Village. Throughout the season, away from the drama, Charrisse struggles with the long distance from her husband, who currently resides in New Jersey while she and the children live in Potomac.

Karen Huger grew up in Virginia on a farm and now lives in Potomac with her husband, Raymond. She has two children, her son Brandon, 27, and daughter, Rayvin, 17. Karen's husband, a technology entrepreneur, is president and CEO of an information technology company. With manners and etiquette in hand, Karen is often referred to as the Grand Dame of Potomac. Karen has dedicated her life to being a great mother, and with her son, Brandon, having already left home, she has to prepare for Rayvin leaving as well.

Katie Rost, an international model and TV personality, was born and raised in Potomac. Coming from a very affluent and philanthropic biracial family, Katie is no stranger to the elite social scene of Maryland. Katie was asked by Vogue Magazine editor Anna Wintour to join The Vogue 100 List, a group of intriguing and fashionable women from around the country who act as arbiters of style. Along with being a beauty in Potomac, Katie and her mother run the Ronald F. Rost Charitable Foundation, in memory of her father. When Katie's not working, she focuses on her 3 children, a three-year-old son, James Rocco, and 14-month-old twin daughters, Kathryn and Renee. Katie has been dating one of Potomac’s most eligible bachelors, Andrew, and is very keen to take it to the next level by getting married.

Gizelle Bryant is an active single mother of three daughters, Grace, and twins Angel and Adore. Gizelle's childhood was heavily influenced by her very prominent and powerful parents, who worked in government and philanthropy. Gizelle lived in Baltimore for 7 years after marrying pastor/activist Jamal Bryant, after she graduated from Hampton University. Due to infidelity, the marriage came to an end and Gizelle moved back to Potomac for a fresh start with her children. When Gizelle isn't spending time with her kids, she works with the city council of Birmingham, Alabama to generate funds to revitalize the city as well as raises money for many charities. Throughout the season, Gizelle explores new business endeavors in the beauty industry, more specifically makeup that meets the needs if women of color. She also is learning to date again.

Robyn Dixon is a Baltimore native who graduated from the University of Maryland, with a degree in business marketing. Robyn's early studies allowed her to launch her career as a publicist and event manager at TAA PR, an agency that prides itself on public relations, marketing, and special events specializing in luxury lifestyle, fashion, and hospitality. Robyn successfully balances work and motherhood, being a single mother to 2 sons, seven-year-old Corey and six-year-old Carter. In high school, Robyn met Juan Dixon, and after becoming a couple, the pair moved to Potomac and had a family together. Although separated, the couple still live together and embrace the “new normal.”

== Episodes ==
The Real Housewives of Potomac season 1 episodes
No. overall	No. in season	Title	Original release date	US viewers (millions)
1	1	"Mind Your Manners"	January 17, 2016	2.06
At a birthday celebration for Karen, Gizelle's manners are questioned. Gizelle is under fire from Charrisse for acting not very lady like in her home. Katie is trying to get her boyfriend to propose. Meanwhile, Robyn Dixon must decide if she wants to rekindle her relationship with her ex.
2	2	"Divas, Queens, and Bubalas"	January 24, 2016	1.66
Gizelle's reputation is scrutinized by Karen and Charrisse. Katie taps into her Jewish roots. The ladies meet Ashley, who attempts to break into the Potomac circle.
3	3	"What a Little Whiskey Can Do"	January 31, 2016	1.65
Katie shows her philanthropic side but drama arises when her partner Andrew reveals he may have different plans for marriage. Karen and Charrisse meet Ashley and later Ashley hosts a whiskey tasting in downtown DC but the liquor isn't the only thing causing discomfort.
4	4	"Desperately Seeking Marriage"	February 14, 2016	1.42
Katie does some renovating in secret. The women are left in shock after Charrisse reveals the truth about her marriage. Karen learns how to fly a plane. Ashley spreads some online gossip about the ladies of Potomac, and the ladies aren't happy about it. Ashley hosts a birthday party in Georgetown, D.C.
5	5	"Error on the High Seas"	February 21, 2016	1.62
Karen hosts a couples' event on a yacht to teach Ashley about parties in Potomac. Gizelle brings a new man to the event and Katie faces the consequences of showing too much PDA at Ashley's birthday. Robyn reaches out to Charrise for advice but is left shocked by news of Charrisse's marriage.
6	6	"Beach Session"	March 6, 2016	1.63
Ashley attempts to wow her new friends with a trip to her beach house, but it fails to impress. Elsewhere, Katie struggles to rally support, and Charrisse persuades the ladies to reveal their darkest secrets.
7	7	"Reading Is Fundamental"	March 13, 2016	1.56
Katie is confronted by Gizelle on her strange behavior which leads to the other ladies giving Katie a lesson in Reading 101. The trip takes a turn for the worse and leads to Ashley questioning the future of her new friendships when her husband Michael unexpectedly visits the ladies.
8	8	"All Shades of Shade"	March 20, 2016	1.70
Gizelle explores her business adventures by hosting a focus group for her makeup line, which Katie chooses not to attend. Robyn is left even more confused after her and Juan reminisce on their romantic memories. Karen launches a charity event, but first Ashley and her husband must reach Karen's standards if they are to attend.
9	9	"Fifty Sense"	March 27, 2016	1.59
Charrisse hosts a birthday extravaganza for her 50th, but whether her husband will attend is the question on everyone's mind. Karen reaches a milestone after a college send off for her daughter. A new issue arises among the ladies as Ashley's husband Michael grabs the butt of Katie's boyfriend Andrew on the dance floor.
10	10	"Rules of Enragement"	April 3, 2016	1.64
Katie is in shock when her husband surprises her with a trip to Scotland, that he is taking without her. Ashley feels the pressure of having kids as she get older and shares that pressure with her husband. Gizelle decides to host a "come to Jesus" lunch for the ladies to get their friendships back on track. Karen doesn't hold back when it comes to her issues with Ashley while Katie, Robyn and Gizelle argue over the butt grab and racial remarks.
11	11	"Reunion Part One"	April 10, 2016	1.51
The ladies reunite for the first half of the reunion. The ladies discuss some topics from the first season, such as Ashley's ability to hostess, Robyn's feelings for her ex-husband and the racial remarks reignite their heated feelings.
12	12	"Reunion Part Two"	April 17, 2016	1.39
The ladies reunite for the second half of the reunion. Katie opens up on where her relationship stands now, and Karen and Ashley's husbands join the stage. Charrisse follows suit and reveals where her relationship with her husband also stands.
