= The Real Housewives of Potomac season 10 =

The Real Housewives of Potomac
- Season 10
- Promotional poster via Peacock
- Starring: Gizelle Bryant; Ashley Darby; Wendy Osefo; Stacey Rusch; Keiarna Stewart; Tia Glover; Angel Massie
- No. of episodes: 20

Release
- Original network: Bravo
- Original release: October 5, 2025 – March 1, 2026

Season chronology
- ← Previous; Season 9

The tenth season of The Real Housewives of Potomac, an American reality television series, is broadcast on Bravo. It premiered on October 5, 2025, and concluded on March 1, 2026. It was primarily filmed in Potomac, Maryland. The season's executive producers are Steven Weinstock, Glenda Hersh, Lauren Eskelin, Lorraine Haughton-Lawson, Nora Devin Zimmerman, Leola Westbrook-Lawrence and Andy Cohen.

The season focuses on the personal and professional lives of Gizelle Bryant, Ashley Darby, Wendy Osefo, Stacey Rusch, Keiarna Stewart, Tia Glover and Angel Massie, with Jassi Rideaux and Monique Samuels appearing as friends of the housewives.

This season marked the final appearance of Keiarna Stewart as well as the only appearance of Angel Massie.

== Cast ==
In February 2025, during the airing of the ninth season's reunion, Karen Huger was sentenced to two years in jail, with one year suspended after her DUI conviction in December 2024. Two days after Huger's sentencing, it was announced that the tenth season would film without her with filming expected at the end of March 2025. In April 2025, Mia Thornton announced her departure from the series after being a housewife for four seasons. In June 2025, it was announced that former housewife Monique Samuels would return to the series in a "friend of" capacity. In August 2025, it was announced that the tenth season would premiere on October 5, 2025. Gizelle Bryant, Ashley Darby, Wendy Osefo, Stacey Rusch and Keiarna Stewart all returned alongside new housewives Tia Glover and Angel Massie. Jassi Rideaux also appeared as a "friend of the housewives".

== Production ==
Filming for the tenth season began in May 2025 and concluded in August 2025. The Real Housewives of Potomac is produced by Truly Original for Bravo. Steven Weinstock, Glenda Hersh, Lauren Eskelin, Lorraine Haughton-Lawson, Nora Devin Zimmerman, Leola Westbrook-Lawrence, and Andy Cohen are recognized as the series' executive producers. Jackie Hebert, Nick Prescott and EJ Dutton serve as co-executive producers.

== Episodes ==
The Real Housewives of Potomac season 10 episodes
No. overall	No. in season	Title	Original release date	U.S. viewers (millions)
173	1	"Second Bloom"	October 5, 2025	0.43
174	2	"Mint to Be Shady"	October 12, 2025	0.45
175	3	"Chin Checked"	October 19, 2025	0.50
176	4	"Tropic Like It's Hot"	October 26, 2025	0.53
177	5	"Sunshine and Sexts"	November 2, 2025	0.43
178	6	"Suns Out, Buns Out"	November 9, 2025	0.49
179	7	"Guess Who's Back?"	November 16, 2025	0.42
180	8	"Pride and Pettiness"	November 23, 2025	0.42
181	9	"Leak What You Speak"	November 30, 2025	0.52
182	10	"Blunt Truths"	December 7, 2025	0.52
183	11	"Lease Is Up, Giddy Up"	December 14, 2025	0.47
184	12	"Potomac and Ponies and Problems"	December 21, 2025	0.50
185	13	"Altitude with Attitude"	January 4, 2026	0.42
186	14	"High and Dry"	January 11, 2026	0.48
187	15	"The Rocky Road to Sisterhood"	January 18, 2026	0.56
188	16	"Driving on Empty"	January 25, 2026	0.50
189	17	"Karen Comes Home"	February 1, 2026	0.76
190	18	"Reunion Part 1"	February 15, 2026	0.72
191	19	"Reunion Part 2"	February 22, 2026	0.79
192	20	"Reunion Part 3"	March 1, 2026	0.73
