= Spring Awakening =

Spring Awakening may refer to:

== Film ==
- Spring Awakening (1924 film), an Austrian silent drama film based on the play
- Spring Awakening (1929 film), a silent film based on the play

== Theatre ==
- Spring Awakening (play), an 1891 play by Frank Wedekind
- Spring Awakening (musical), a 2006 musical by Steven Sater and Duncan Sheik based on the Wedekind play

== Other uses ==
- Operation Spring Awakening (German: Frühlingserwachen), Nazi Germany's last World War II offensive
- Spring Awakening Music Festival, an annual musical festival held in Chicago
- "Spring Awakening" (Law & Order: Special Victims Unit)
- "Spring Awakening" (The Real Housewives of Potomac)
