= Love Hotel (TV series) =

- Genre: Reality
- Presented by: Joel Kim Booster
- Starring: Shannon Storms Beador; Gizelle Bryant; Ashley Darby; Luann de Lesseps
- Country of origin: United States
- Original language: English
- No. of seasons: 1
- No. of episodes: 8

Production
- Executive producers: Lisa Shannon; Dan Peirson; Trifari Williams; Tom Ciaccio
- Production company: Shed Media

Original release
- Network: Bravo
- Release: April 27, 2025 – present

Love Hotel is an American reality television series that premiered on April 27, 2025, on Bravo. The series follows four women from The Real Housewives franchise as they go on a vacation seeking love.

== Premise ==
Shannon Storms Beador, Gizelle Bryant, Ashley Darby and Luann de Lesseps travel to Los Cabos, Mexico, where they explore new connections and go on dates with eligible bachelors.

== Production ==
In July 2024, it was announced Peacock had ordered a spin-off of The Real Housewives franchise starring Shannon Storms Beador, Ashley Darby, Gizelle Bryant, and Luann de Lesseps. In February 2025, it was revealed the series had moved to Bravo.

=== Cast members ===
Cast member	Franchise
Gizelle Bryant	Potomac
Ashley Darby	Potomac
Luann de Lesseps	New York City
Shannon Storms Beador	Orange County

== Episodes ==
No.	Title	Original release date	U.S. viewers (millions)
1	"Putting the Wives Back in Housewives"	April 27, 2025	0.39
2	"Three's a Crowd"	May 4, 2025	0.38
3	"Romance in Retrograde"	May 11, 2025	0.30
4	"Wreck It, Ralph?"	May 18, 2025	0.32
5	"Guess Who's Back"	May 25, 2025	0.32
6	"The Love Boat"	June 1, 2025	0.46
7	"The Spa Before the Storm"	June 8, 2025	0.37
8	"Check Out Time"	June 15, 2025	0.39
