= Chris Samuels =

American football player and coach (born 1977)

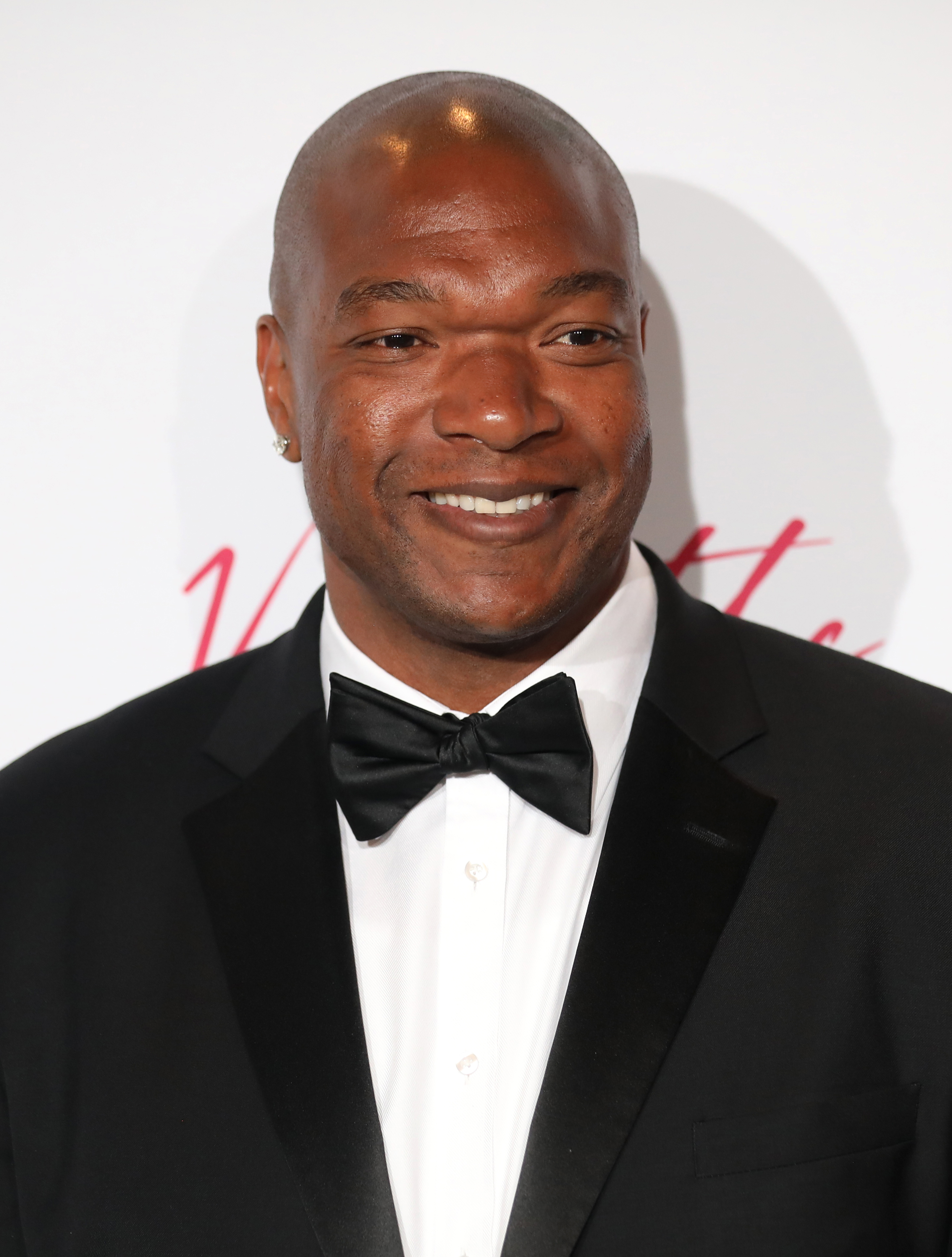
- Samuels in 2024

No. 60
- Position: Offensive tackle

Personal information
- Born: July 28, 1977 (age 49); Mobile, Alabama, U.S.
- Listed height: 6 ft 5 in (1.96 m)
- Listed weight: 314 lb (142 kg)

Career information
- High school: John Shaw (Mobile)
- College: Alabama (1996–1999)
- NFL draft: 2000: 1st round, 3rd overall pick

Career history

Playing
- Washington Redskins (2000–2009)

Coaching
- Alabama (2012–2014) Assistant offensive line coach (2012 CFB Champion as Asst. Coach)

Awards and highlights
- 6× Pro Bowl (2001, 2002, 2005–2008); PFWA All-Rookie Team (2000); Washington 90 Greatest; Washington Commanders Ring of Fame; Unanimous All-American (1999); Outland Trophy (1999); Jacobs Blocking Trophy (1999); First-team All-SEC (1999); Second-team All-SEC (1997)

Career NFL statistics
- Games played: 141
- Games started: 141
- Fumble recoveries: 4
- Stats at Pro Football Reference

Chris Samuels (born July 28, 1977) is an American former professional football player who was an offensive tackle for 10 seasons in the National Football League (NFL). He played college football for the Alabama Crimson Tide, and was recognized as a unanimous All-American. Selected third overall in the 2000 NFL draft, Samuels played his entire pro career for the NFL's Washington Redskins (now Washington Commanders) and was a six-time Pro Bowl selection.

== Early life ==
Samuels was born in Mobile, Alabama. He attended John Shaw High School in Mobile, where he played both offense and defense for the John Shaw high school football team, and helped Shaw to an 8–3 record and a spot in the AHSAA playoffs.

== College career ==
While attending the University of Alabama, Samuels played for the Alabama Crimson Tide football team from 1996 to 1999. As senior in 1999, he was named to the All-Southeastern Conference (SEC) first team by the conference's coaches, the Associated Press, the Birmingham News and the Mobile Press Register, and was recognized as a unanimous All-American. He also won the Outland Trophy as the nation's best college interior lineman, and was a semifinalist for the Lombardi Award.

Samuels won the Jacobs Blocking Trophy as the SEC's most outstanding blocker. He started 42 straight games, from early in his 1996 freshman season until his last regular-season game as a senior, without yielding a sack. Samuels did not allow a quarterback pressure in 1999, had 91 knockdown blocks and played nearly every offensive snap during the regular season, and opening holes for Crimson Tide running back Shaun Alexander, who gained 1,383 yards rushing.

== Professional career ==
Samuels was considered the premier offensive tackle prospect in the 2000 NFL draft. He did not work out at the NFL Combine after sustaining an injury to his right knee. He was drafted third overall by the Washington Redskins, who had given up two first-round picks (12th and 24th) plus a fourth and fifth-round choice to move up to third in the first round. Samuels was the only offensive tackle drafted in the top 19 of the draft, and the first Alabama offensive lineman selected in the first round of an NFL Draft since Bob Cryder in 1978.

Pre-draft measurables
Height	Weight
6 ft 5 1/8 in (1.96 m)	325 lb (147 kg)
Values from NFL Combine

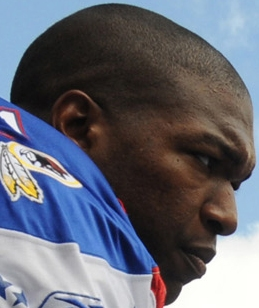
Samuels at the 2008 Pro Bowl.

"Excellent athlete, good run man and pass blocker, and can run like a deer. We isolate him one on one like we did with Lachey and leave him on the same guy the whole game. He’s like Gilligan, he’s got this guy the whole game."

— Joe Bugel, former Redskins offensive line coach.

Samuels immediately became the starting left tackle for the Redskins and was then selected to six Pro Bowls. In 2000, Samuels was one of only four players on offense to start every game, joining Jon Jansen, Mark Fischer and Stephen Alexander. Samuels won co-Offensive Rookie of the Month for October with Dolphins tackle Todd Wade. He missed the last three quarters in the season finale vs. Arizona with a neck injury. In 2001, Samuels started all 16 regular-season games at left tackle and was voted to the Pro Bowl, he earned game balls, along with the rest of the offensive line, for two games: vs. Seattle and at New Orleans. Samuels was featured on the cover of the December 3, 2001 issue of Sports Illustrated along with running back Stephen Davis after becoming the first team in NFL history to lose its first five games, then go on to win its next five games.

In 2002, Samuels started 15 regular-season games at left tackle and earned his second consecutive trip to the Pro Bowl. He was also voted as the Redskins 2002 Ed Block Courage Award winner. In 2003, he started 13 regular-season games at left tackle and missed games vs. New Orleans, at New York Giants and vs. Dallas because of a knee injury.

In 2004, he started all 16 regular-season games at left tackle and helped running back Clinton Portis rush for 1,315 yards, becoming only the fourth Redskin in history to do so in a single season.

Samuels was regarded as the leader of Washington's offensive line. During the 2005 off-season, the Redskins signed him to a 7-year contract worth about $47 million and a signing bonus of about $16 million. In 2005, he started all 16 regular-season games and two postseason contests at left tackle. He was named to the Pro Bowl after helped open up running lanes for Clinton Portis to rush for a franchise-record 1,516 yards. In 2006, he started all 16 regular-season games at left tackle. He helped Ladell Betts rush for a career-best 1,154 rushing yards and four touchdowns. Samuels was named to the Pro Bowl for the second consecutive season.

In 2007, Samuels was named to the Pro Bowl for the third consecutive season and started all 16 regular-season games and one postseason contest at left tackle. He paved the way for the Redskins to post their third highest all-time rushing total in a single game ( 296 yards on 48 carries) at New York Jets on November 4. Samuels was fined $12,500 for delivering an illegal chop block that injured Antonio Garay of the Chicago Bears during a game in 2007. He later apologized to Garay, who spent the remainder of the season on Injured Reserve, as well as to Bears head coach Lovie Smith. In 2008, New York Giants defensive end Mathias Kiwanuka accused Samuels of "dirty play," after he made a low tackle on Kiwanuka during the final minutes of the 2008 NFL season opener. Samuels denied allegations that he intentionally attempted to injure Kiwanuka, stating "On that particular play I was just trying to protect my quarterback... It was never my intention to go out there and injure another player."

In 2008, Samuels was named a Team Captain played and started in 12 regular season games and was inactive in one contest with knee cartilage irritation at Detroit on October 26, seeing his consecutive starting streak snapped at 73 games. He was placed on Injured Reserve by a triceps tear on December 9, 2008, and missed the last three games. Samuels was named to the 2008 Pro Bowl but did not play because of the triceps injury. He paved the way for Clinton Portis to rank fourth in the NFL in rushing yards (1,487) and total yards from scrimmage (1,705). Portis tied for the NFL lead in total first downs (82) with Chicago Bears RB Matt Forte and Atlanta Falcons RB Michael Turner. Samuels helped Portis to have the second-most rushing yards (1,487) in a single-season in club history and opened up running lanes for Portis to post more than 120 yards rushing in five consecutive contests (121 rushing yards, at Dallas; 145 at Philadelphia; 129 vs. St. Louis; 175 vs. Cleveland, and 126 at Detroit). Samuels led the way for Portis to tie a club record for most consecutive 100-yard rushing games (5 straight contests in 2008), a record shared by Rob Goode (1951), Portis (2005) and Ladell Betts (2006).

Samuels suffered through temporary upper-body paralysis based on compression of his neck during a helmet to helmet hit while in pass protection on a play against the Carolina Panthers on October 11, 2009. The injury was determined to be related to spinal stenosis, a condition that he was diagnosed with as a child. Due to the risk of incurring a long-term, severe injury related to his condition by continuing his career, he retired from the NFL on March 4, 2010, based on advice from his doctors.

== Coaching career ==
Samuels indicated during his retirement press conference with the Washington Redskins that he intended to continue his career in football and become a coach. In 2010, he participated in the NFL's Minority Coaching Fellowship as an assistant to the Redskins' offensive line coach Chris Foerster. In February 2011, Samuels volunteered as the offensive coordinator at Mattie T. Blount High School in Prichard, Alabama. At Blount, he helped lead the Leopards to an overall record of 10–2 and an appearance in the Alabama High School Athletic Association playoffs. After only one season at Blount, in January 2012 Samuels returned to the University of Alabama to serve as a student assistant coach for Crimson Tide head coach Nick Saban. There he was an assistant offensive line coach while working to complete his degree in physical education. In 2015, he left Alabama to become a high school coach at Osbourn High School in Manassas, Virginia. In November 2016, Samuels stepped down from the Osbourn football coach job. In 2017, Samuels was hired as the offensive coordinator at Winston Churchill High School in Potomac, Maryland. After stepping down at Winston Churchill in 2019, Samuels was hired as offensive coordinator at Northwest High School in Germantown, Maryland.

== Honors ==
Samuels was inducted into the Alabama Sports Hall of Fame as part of the 2016 class. He was inducted into the Redskins Ring of Fame on October 20, 2019, at halftime against the San Francisco 49ers.

== Personal life ==
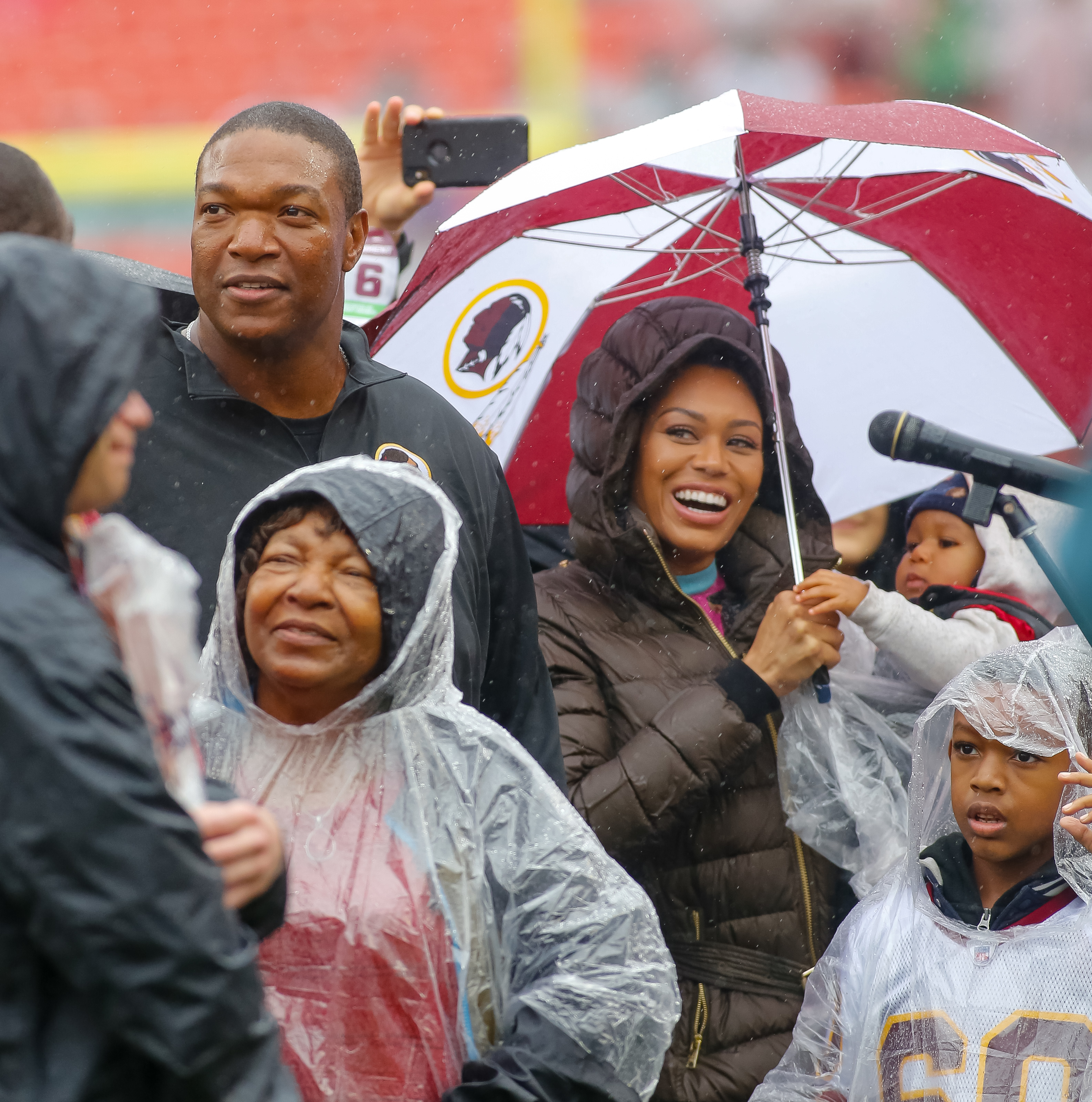
Chris Samuels with his family (2019)

Samuels is the younger brother of Arena Football League player and coach Lawrence Samuels. He married longtime girlfriend Monique Cox in March 2012. They have three children. Monique appeared as a cast member on The Real Housewives of Potomac for four seasons. On June 15, 2023, Monique filed for divorce after 11 years of marriage, with the divorce being finalized on September 25, 2023.
