= Gloria Bonilla-Santiago =

Puerto Rican-American academic

Dr. Gloria Bonilla-Santiago
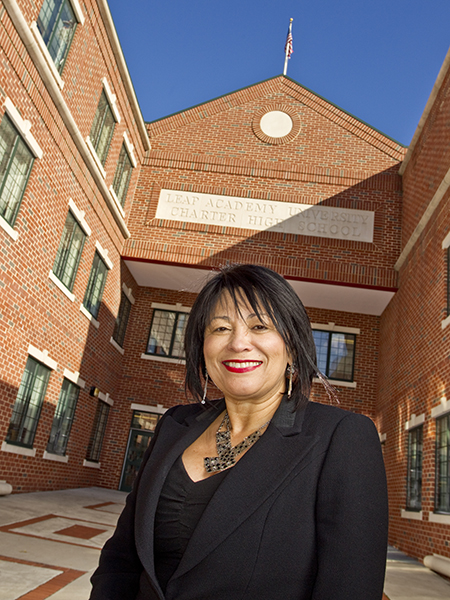
- Gloria Bonilla-Santiago in 2010
- Born: January 17, 1954 (age 72); Sabana Grande, Puerto Rico

Academic background
- Education: Glassboro State College (BA); Rutgers University–New Brunswick (MA); City University of New York (MSW, PhD)
- Thesis: A case study of Puerto Rican migrant farmworkers organizational effectiveness in New Jersey. (1986)

Gloria Bonilla-Santiago (born January 17, 1954) is a Board of Governors Distinguished Service Professor at the Department of Public Policy and Administration and Director of the Center for Strategic Urban Community Leadership at Rutgers University–Camden. She is also the founder of Leadership, Education, and Partnership (LEAP) Academy University Charter School located in Camden, New Jersey. Created in 1997, LEAP is one of the 17 inaugural public charter schools in New Jersey. As the founder of LEAP, Bonilla-Santiago created a merit pay/pay-for-performance program designed to reward excellence in teaching and improve student academic outcomes.

== Early life ==
Bonilla-Santiago’s parents migrated to the United States from Puerto Rico. She received a B.A. from Glassboro State College, now known as Rowan University; an M.S.W. from Rutgers University; and an M.A. in Philosophy and Ph.D. in Sociology from City University of New York. She has also completed post-doctoral studies at the John F. Kennedy School of Government at Harvard University.

== Professional life ==
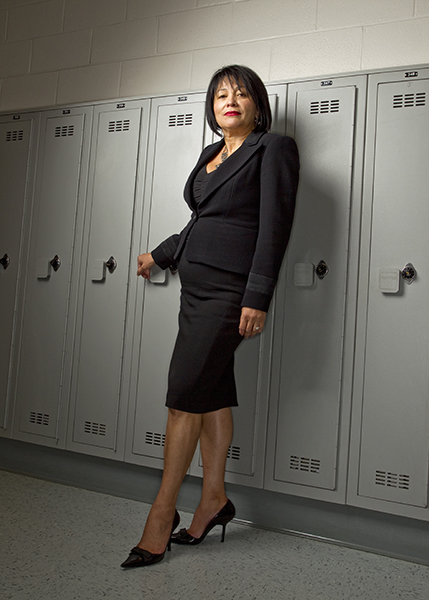
Gloria Bonilla-Santiago in 2010

Bonilla-Santiago is an expert in the fields of community development, migration of women, diversity management, organizational leadership and public policy. She is considered a pioneer in the application of social capital to improve challenged schools and communities.

Bonilla-Santiago is an advocate of merit-based pay for teachers which has been with success at LEAP Academy. Both teacher tenure and merit pay have been combined in a professional development and performance-based compensation program that rewards teachers based on their ability to help students make significant academic gains as well as their willingness and contributions to school-wide success. On February 23, 2011, Santiago appeared on MSNBC Andrea Mitchell Reports to discuss merit pay for teachers. Bonilla-Santiago is also a specialist columnist with the Huffington Post where she discusses educational issues such as charter schools and the need for increased science, math and technology education in elementary and secondary schools.

== LEAP Academy University Charter School ==
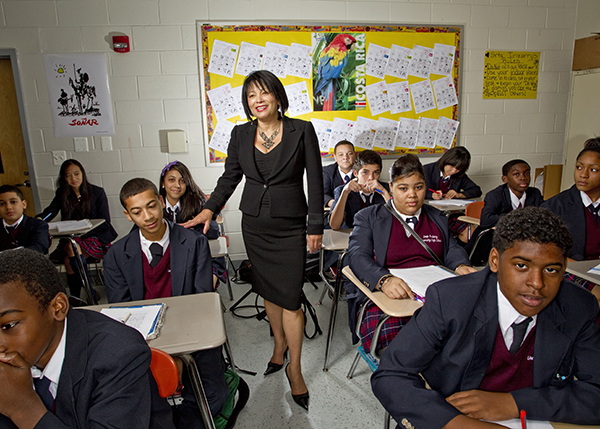
Gloria Bonilla-Santiago in 2010

In 1993, Bonilla-Santiago and the Rutgers-Camden Center for Strategic Urban Community Leadership developed the concept of an independently governed, public charter school that could improve education and opportunities for the children and families of Camden, NJ. This concept led to Bonilla-Santiago’s creation of LEAP Academy University Charter School in 1997, one of 13 inaugural public charter schools in New Jersey. It was the first new school to open in Camden in 30 years.

The academy initially opened as a K-5 charter school serving 324 students. Each subsequent year, it added a grade until reaching full enrollment of 780 students in grades K-12. It also houses a 90-student preschool program. The school is founded on a model where the entire community, students, parents and local organizations and businesses have a vested interest in student success.

The academy was first housed in temporary modular units in Camden and is now located in two facilities. An elementary school building was opened in 1999 after a $7.5 million renovation grant from the Delaware River Port Authority (DRPA). A high school building, meanwhile, was a combined effort; Rutgers leased the land for the building and the DRPA provided a $2 million grant and $8 million in tax-exempt bonds for its construction in 2005.

In 2003, LEAP was honored with the Pioneer Award and Exemplary School Award during the first New Jersey Charter Schools Recognition Ceremony sponsored by the New Jersey Department of Education Office of Innovative Programs.

== Alfredo Santiago Endowed Scholarship ==
The Alfredo Santiago Endowed Scholarship was established in 1999 by Bonilla-Santiago in memory of her husband, Alfredo Santiago, to increase the number of students in Camden who attend college. It provides financial assistance to first-year undergraduate students who graduate from LEAP Academy University Charter School and enroll full-time at one of Rutgers University’s campuses. In 2002, a donation from former President/CEO of Commerce Bank, Vernon Hill, created the Commerce Alfredo Santiago Scholarship, which allowed the endowment to support students attending other colleges as well.

== Books ==
Gloria Bonilla-Santiago is the author of three books:

1. Breaking Ground and Barriers: Hispanic Women Developing Effective Leadership (Marin, 1992),
2. Organizing Puerto Rican Migrant Farmworkers: The Experience of Puerto Ricans in New Jersey (Peter Lang, 1988)
3. The Miracle on Cooper Street: Lessons from an Inner City (Archway, 2014)

She has published numerous articles and monographs and contributed a chapter to Helping Battered Women, edited by A. Roberts (Oxford University Press, 1996).

== Awards and honors ==
- 2008 L’Oreal Paris Women of Worth Award
- 2007 National Mujer Award from the National Hispana Leadership Institute
- 1993 Congressional Citation from Congressman Frank Pallone Jr. for contributions to the Hispanic Community
- 1992 Warren I. Susman Award for Excellence in Teaching
