= The Real Housewives of Potomac =

American reality television series

- Genre: Reality
- Starring: Gizelle Bryant; Ashley Darby; Robyn Dixon; Karen Huger; Charrisse Jackson-Jordan; Katie Rost; Monique Samuels; Candiace Dillard Bassett; Wendy Osefo; Mia Thornton; Nneka Ihim; Stacey Rusch; Keiarna Stewart; Tia Glover; Angel Massie; Courtney Ajinça
- Country of origin: United States
- Original language: English
- No. of seasons: 11
- No. of episodes: 198 (list of episodes)

Production
- Executive producers: Steven Weinstock; Glenda Hersh; Lauren Eskelin; Lorraine Haughton-Lawson; Kemar Bassaragh; Bianca Barnes-Williams; Ashley McFarlin Buie; Andy Cohen; Nora Devin; Eric Fuller; Leola Westbrook-Lawrence
- Camera setup: Multiple
- Running time: 42 minutes
- Production companies: True Entertainment (seasons 1–2); Truly Original (season 3–present)

Original release
- Network: Bravo
- Release: January 17, 2016 – present

Related
- Karen's Grande Dame Reunion

The Real Housewives of Potomac, abbreviated RHOP, is an American reality television series that premiered on January 17, 2016, on Bravo. Developed as the eighth installment of The Real Housewives franchise, it has aired ten seasons and focuses on the personal and professional lives of women living in and around Potomac, Maryland, a city in the Washington, D.C. tri-state area.

The cast of the eleventh season consists of Gizelle Bryant, Ashley Darby, Karen Huger, Wendy Osefo, Stacey Rusch, Tia Glover, and Courtney Ajinça with former housewives Monique Samuels and Robyn Dixon serving as "friends of the housewives". Other previously featured cast members include Katie Rost, Charrisse Jackson-Jordan, Candiace Dillard Bassett, Nneka Ihim, Mia Thornton, Keiarna Stewart, and Angel Massie.

== Overview ==
Initially titled Potomac Ensemble, The Real Housewives of Potomac was announced on November 11, 2015. The series is the network's second attempt to develop a reality series based in the Washington, D.C. area. The first effort was The Real Housewives of D.C., which aired in 2010 and was canceled after one season.

The first season premiered on January 17, 2016, and starred Gizelle Bryant, Ashley Darby, Robyn Dixon, Karen Huger, Charrisse Jackson-Jordan and Katie Rost. After the filming for the second season began, Rost was fired from the show. Monique Samuels was then added to the cast for the second season which premiered on April 2, 2017. The third season premiered on April 1, 2018, with Candiace Dillard Bassett joining the cast and Jordan appearing in a "friend" capacity. Jordan left the show after the third season. The fourth season, which began filming in August 2018, premiered on May 5, 2019. The season featured Dillard's wedding and Rost as a "friend of the housewives." Rost was not invited back to the fourth season's reunion taping or for the following season.

The fifth season premiered on August 2, 2020, with Wendy Osefo as the newest cast member and Jackson Jordan appearing as a guest. In December 2020, Samuels announced her departure from the series, despite receiving a contract for the next season. The sixth season premiered on July 11, 2021, with new housewife Mia Thornton and friend of the housewives Askale Davis joining.

The seventh season premiered on October 9, 2022, with Davis departing, former housewife Charrisse Jackson-Jordan returning as a friend of the housewives, alongside Jacqueline Blake. Former cast members Rost and Davis both made a guest appearance. The eighth season premiered on November 5, 2023, with new housewife Nneka Ihim and friend of the housewives Keiarna Stewart joining, alongside Jackson-Jordan returning in a "friend of the housewives" capacity. Former cast member Blake made guest appearances.

In 2024, Candiace Dillard and Robyn Dixon confirmed they would not be returning for season 9. In May 2024, Nneka Ihim confirmed her departure from the show, after only one season. The ninth season premiered on October 6, 2024, with new housewife Stacey Rusch and new friend of the housewives Jassi Rideaux joining the cast, alongside Blake returning in a “friend of” capacity and Stewart being promoted to a full-time role. Jackson-Jordan left the show again after the eighth season.

In February 2025, People reported filming for the tenth season was expected to commence at the end of March, without Huger, following her DUI conviction. Two months later, Thornton announced her departure from the franchise. In June, it was announced Samuels would return for the tenth season in a "friend of" capacity. The tenth season premiered on October 5, 2025, with new housewives Tia Glover and Angel Massie joining the cast, alongside Rideaux returning in a "friend of" capacity. In April 2026, Bravo announced production on the eleventh season had begun. Bryant, Darby, Osefo, Glover, and Rusch were named as returning housewives. It will also feature the returns of original housewives Huger and Dixon, with Huger returning as a full-time housewife and Dixon as a friend. The eleventh season premiered on October 11, 2026. Alongside the previously mentioned returns, Courtney Ajinça will be introduced as a housewife and Samuels returning as a friend.

== Cast ==
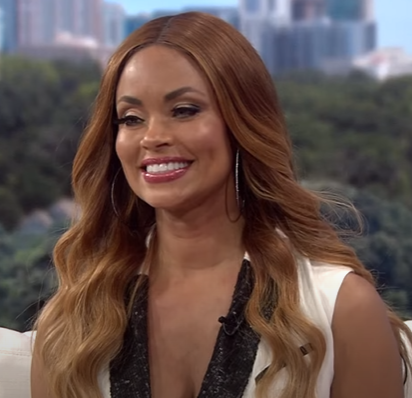
Gizelle Bryant

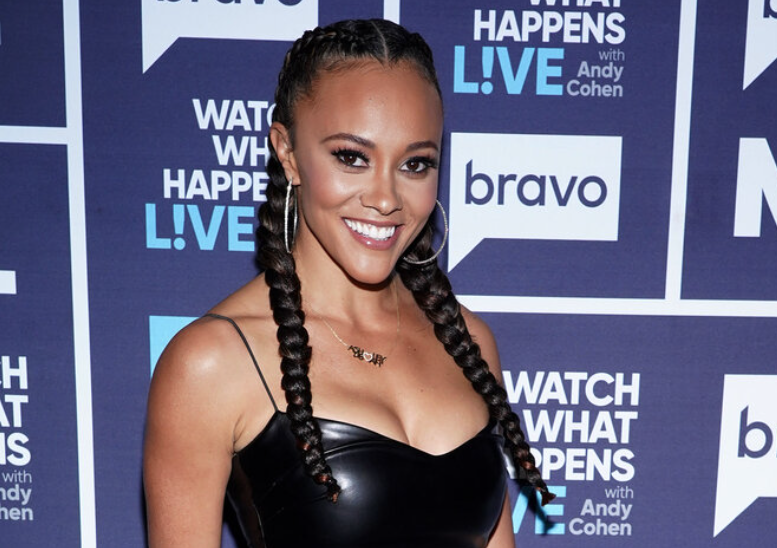
Ashley Darby

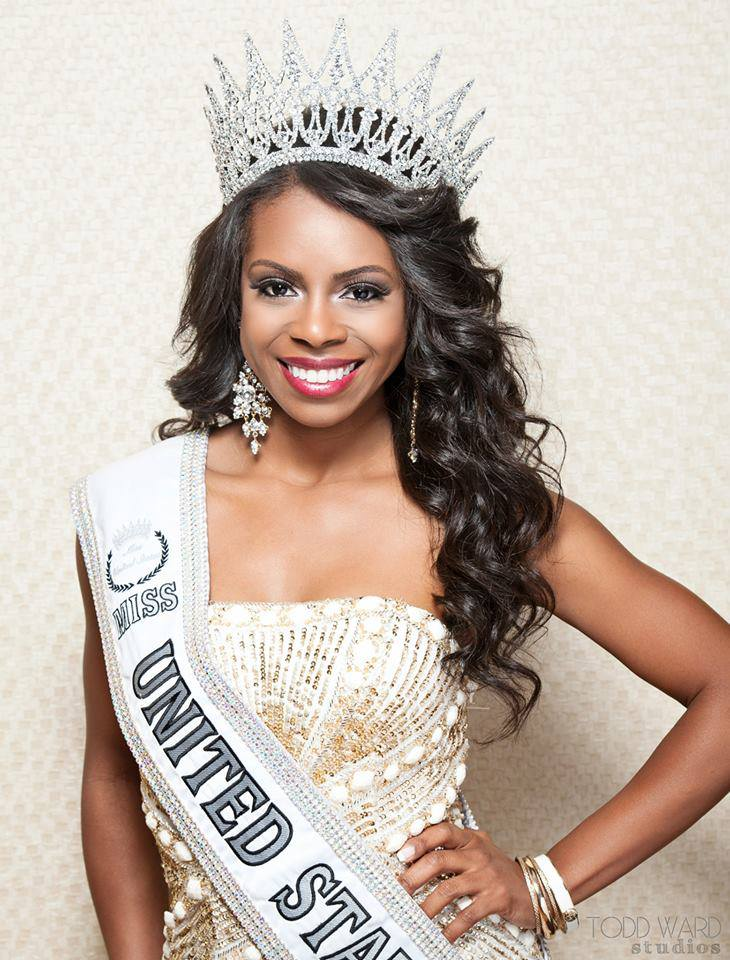
Candiace Dillard Bassett

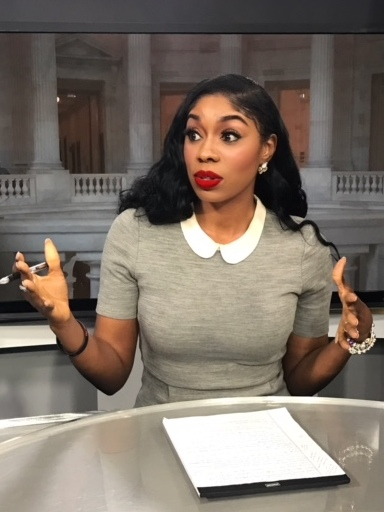
Wendy Osefo

Main cast members
Cast member	Seasons										
Cast member	1	2	3	4	5	6	7	8	9	10	11
Gizelle Bryant	Main	Main	Main	Main	Main	Main	Main	Main	Main	Main	Main
Ashley Darby	Main	Main	Main	Main	Main	Main	Main	Main	Main	Main	Main
Robyn Dixon	Main	Main	Main	Main	Main	Main	Main	Main			Friend
Karen Huger	Main	Main	Main	Main	Main	Main	Main	Main	Main	Guest	Main
Charrisse Jackson-Jordan	Main	Main	Friend		Guest		Friend	Friend		Guest	
Katie Rost	Main	Guest		Friend			Guest				
Monique Samuels		Main	Main	Main	Main					Friend	Friend
Candiace Dillard Bassett			Main	Main	Main	Main	Main	Main			
Wendy Osefo					Main	Main	Main	Main	Main	Main	Main
Mia Thornton						Main	Main	Main	Main		
Nneka Ihim								Main			
Stacey Rusch							Guest		Main	Main	Main
Keiarna Stewart					Guest			Friend	Main	Main	
Tia Glover										Main	Main
Angel Massie										Main	
Courtney Ajinça											Main
Friends of the housewives
Askale Davis						Friend	Guest				
Jacqueline Blake							Friend	Guest	Friend		
Jassi Rideaux									Friend	Friend	

== Episodes ==
The Real Housewives of Potomac episodes
Season	Episodes	Originally released		Average Viewers
Season	Episodes	First released	Last released	Average Viewers
1	12	January 17, 2016	April 17, 2016	1.59
2	14	April 2, 2017	July 16, 2017	1.40
3	20	April 1, 2018	August 19, 2018	1.02
4	21	May 5, 2019	September 29, 2019	1.05
5	22	August 2, 2020	December 27, 2020	1.03
6	22	July 11, 2021	December 5, 2021	1.00
7	20	October 9, 2022	March 5, 2023	0.86
8	21	November 5, 2023	April 14, 2024	0.70
9	20	October 6, 2024	March 2, 2025	0.58
10	20	October 5, 2025	March 1, 2026	0.53
11	TBA	October 11, 2026	TBA	TBA

== Reception ==
=== Viewership ===
The premiere episode of The Real Housewives of Potomac received a 1.2 rating in adults 18–49 years adult demographic and 2.54 million viewers in total, according to Nielsen Media Research's "live plus-3" estimates. The episode was the highest-rated premiere of any series of The Real Housewives franchise. The first season of the series averaged 2.1 million viewers in the "live plus-3" estimates, becoming the network's most-watched first season of a series since The Real Housewives of Beverly Hills in 2010.

Bravo announced in February 2024, that with delayed viewing attributed, the season eight premiere drew the show's biggest premiere audience in its history, with 2.2 million viewers and the shows most watched season across all platforms, with 2.7 million.

=== Critical response ===
The reality series has received mostly positive reviews from television critics. Amy Amatangelo, writing for The Hollywood Reporter, said, "Like its predecessors, The Real Housewives of Potomac offers escapist TV at the highest level," and also added, "You can watch with the comfort that you would never behave this way and delight in all the ridiculous shenanigans." Amatangelo praised the show's diversity by saying that the network aims for the franchise to be "an equal-opportunity offender". Joi-Marie McKenzie of ABC News, reviewing the show's premiere, said, "Between the show introductions, there was plenty of shade-throwing and one-liners to keep "Housewives" enthusiasts entertained."

== Controversies ==
During the fifth season of RHOP, cast member Monique Samuels got into a physical altercation with co-star Candiace Dillard Bassett. Samuels and Dillard Bassett were both charged with second-degree assault in Maryland's District Court of Montgomery County. Both women appeared in court, and all charges were dropped. Samuels did not return to The Real Housewives of Potomac for its sixth season, despite being asked back by the network.

On February 26, 2025, following a guilty conviction for a DUI in 2024, Huger was sentenced to two years in prison, with one year probation. Huger began serving time immediately. Huger was released from jail early on September 2.

In October 2025, Osefo and her husband were arrested in Westminster, Maryland, and charged with multiple counts of fraud. The charges stem from allegations that the couple falsely reported a burglary at their home in April 2024, claiming losses of designer goods and jewelry. Investigators found inconsistencies in their claims, including that some items reported stolen had been returned to stores or were still in their possession after the reported break‑in.
