= Candiace Dillard Bassett =

American TV personality (born 1986)

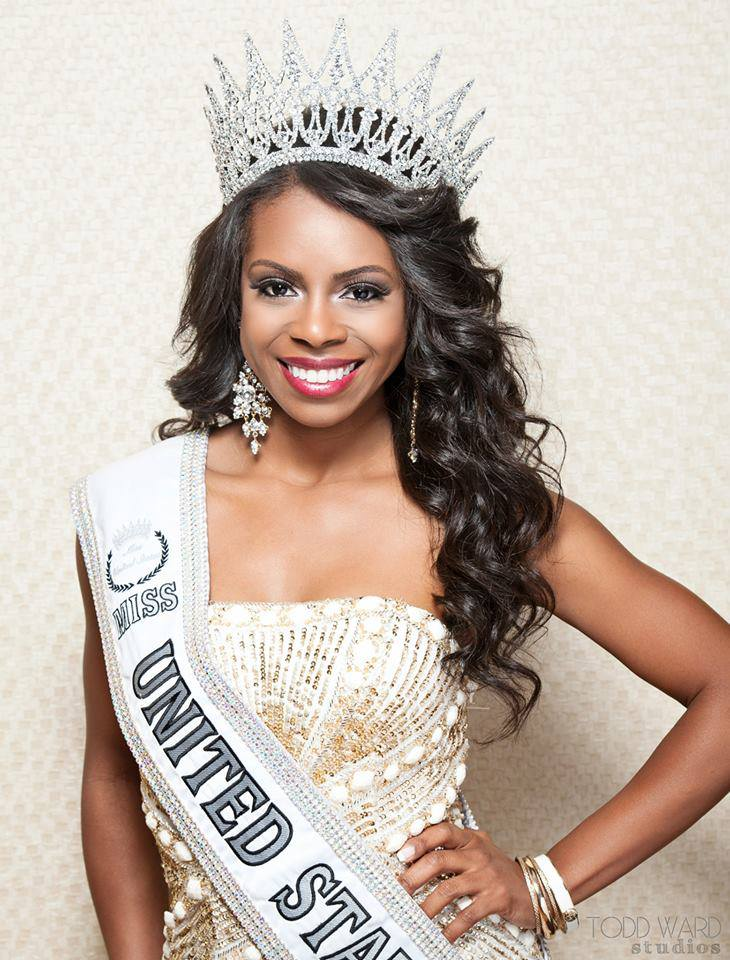
- Dillard Bassett as Miss United States in 2013
- Born: Candiace Dominique Dillard; December 14, 1986 (age 39); Biloxi, Mississippi, U.S.
- Education: Howard University (BA; MBA)
- Occupations: Television personality; singer
- Height: 5 ft 3 in (1.60 m)
- Spouse: Chris Bassett (m. 2018)
- Children: 1
- Beauty pageant titleholder
- Title: Miss United States 2013; Miss District of Columbia US 2013
- Years active: 2010–present
- Major competitions: Miss Maryland USA 2010 (Top 10); Miss Maryland USA 2011 (Top 10); Miss District of Columbia USA 2012 (2nd Runner-Up); Miss District of Columbia USA 2013 (1st Runner-Up); Miss District of Columbia US 2013 (Winner); Miss United States 2013 (Winner)

Candiace Dominique Dillard Bassett (née Dillard; born December 14, 1986) is an American television personality, singer and pageant titleholder. She is recognized for winning Miss United States in 2013 and starring in The Real Housewives of Potomac (2018–2024). In 2021, she released her debut album Deep Space.

== Early life and education ==
Bassett was born on December 14, 1986, in Biloxi, Mississippi. She grew up in Atlanta, Georgia with her parents, both physicians for the Air Force. Bassett has two siblings, Crystal and Michael. In 2009, she graduated from Howard University, an HBCU in Washington, D.C., with a Bachelor of Arts degree in communications and broadcast journalism.

In 2012, Bassett served a tenure in the White House offices of Public Engagement and Intergovernmental Affairs under President Barack Obama and as a staffer for President Obama's 2012 re-election campaign. In 2020, she returned to Howard University to obtain a Masters of Business Administration degree, graduating in May 2022.

== Pageantry ==
Bassett has competed across many pageant systems, including Sunburst, National American Miss, National Miss American Coed, Georgia Miss American Coed, Miss Maryland USA, Miss District of Columbia USA, and Miss United States. She was crowned Miss United States 2013; during the national pageant she represented the District of Columbia.

== Reality television ==
Bassett joined Bravo's reality series The Real Housewives of Potomac as a primary cast member during the show's third season. The fourth season which began filming in August 2018, featured Dillard's wedding and marriage to Chris Bassett. In 2019, Bassett and co-star Monique Samuels were both charged with second-degree assault of each other from the District Court of Montgomery County in Maryland after an alleged incident between Bassett and Samuels on October 16, 2019, during the filming of the show's fifth season. In March 2024, Bassett announced her departure from the series.

In January 2026, Bassett became a contestant on the fourth season of the Peacock reality game show The Traitors.

== Personal life ==
Dillard married Chris Bassett in 2018. In April 2024, a month after Bassett had announced her departure from The Real Housewives of Potomac, it was announced that she and her husband were expecting their first child together. In October 2024, Bassett gave birth to a baby boy, Jett Maxwell Lee Bassett.

== Discography ==
=== Studio albums ===
Title	Album details
Deep Space	Released September 24, 2021; Label: MNRK Music Group; Formats: Digital download, streaming

== Filmography ==
=== Film ===
Year	Title	Role	Notes
2018	Water in a Broken Glass	Nikki	
2021	We Go Deep	Denise	
2023	Cruel Encounters	Destiny	

=== Television ===
Year	Title	Role	Notes
2013	Pivot Point	Victoria	6 episodes
2018	Curvy Girls Rock	Trinity Dennis	
2018–2024	The Real Housewives of Potomac	Herself	Series regular
2020	The Wendy Williams Show	Herself	Guest; Season 13: Episode 6
2020	The Christmas Lottery	Tammy	Television film
2021	Family Reunion	Sunita Chanel	Episode: "Remember When Cocoa Was a Housewife?"
2021	BET Her Presents: The Waiting Room	Rita	Episode: "It Takes Two"
2021	The Real	Herself	Guest; Season 8: Episode 28
2022	Dads Do It Too	Janet Walker	
2022–present	Hush	Syleena	Series regular
2023, 2026	The Real Housewives Ultimate Girls Trip	Herself	7 episodes; Season 3 Guest; Season 5
2023	The Real Housewives of Atlanta	Herself	Episode: "A Star is Reborn"
2023	Love & Hip Hop: Atlanta	Herself	Episode: "Tropic Thunderdome"
2023	Sherri	Herself	Guest; Season 2: Episode 47
2026	The Traitors	Herself	Contestant; Season 4

Awards and achievements
Preceded by Whitney Miller	Miss United States; 2013	Succeeded by Elizabeth Safrit
