= Robyn Dixon (television personality) =

Reality television personality

- Born: Robyn Bragg; March 31, 1979 (age 47)
- Education: University of Maryland, College Park
- Years active: 2016-present
- Known for: The Real Housewives of Potomac; The Traitors
- Spouse: Juan Dixon (married 2005-2012, 2022-present)

Robyn Dixon (née Bragg; born March 31, 1979) is an American television personality, real estate agent, and entrepreneur. She is best known as an original cast member of the Bravo reality television series The Real Housewives of Potomac, which premiered in 2016. Dixon is also the co-host of the podcast Reasonably Shady with fellow Real Housewives of Potomac cast member Gizelle Bryant. She was previously married to former professional basketball player Juan Dixon, with whom she has two sons.

== Early life and education ==
Robyn Dixon was born Robyn Bragg in Baltimore, Maryland to parents Gladys and Guy Bragg. She attended the University of Maryland, College Park, where she graduated with a bachelor’s degree in business administration in 2000.

== Career ==
=== Public Relations ===
Dixon began her career in public relations, working as a publicist and event manager for TAA PR, a Washington, D.C.-based public relations, marketing, and special events firm specializing in luxury lifestyle, fashion, and hospitality. She later served as the lead publicist for GLO30, a skincare company based in the Washington, D.C., area.

=== Real Estate ===
Dixon entered real estate investing with her mother, Gladys Bragg. Bragg initially worked in real estate wholesaling, and after completing several wholesale deals, the pair began rehabbing properties. Dixon described their first rehabilitation project in an interview as a learning experience. In 2017, the two began renovating properties for resale with guidance from real estate investor Marcel Umphery. Their first renovation project was featured on The Real Housewives of Potomac during its third and fourth seasons. Dixon and Bragg subsequently sold the property for a profit of more than $30,000.

=== She is Empowered ===
In 2017, Dixon founded She Is Empowered, a women’s entrepreneurship and professional development initiative that was part of the Visionary Events Group. The initiative hosted seminars and events in the Washington, D.C., area focused on entrepreneurship and developing multiple sources of income.

=== Embellished ===
In 2020, Dixon launched Embellished, an accessories and apparel brand featuring satin-lined baseball caps, graphic T-shirts, hoodies and masks. The satin lining was designed to protect hair from breakage. The business was featured during the fifth season of The Real Housewives of Potomac, including an October 2020 episode in which Dixon presented the line. Following the episode’s airing, Dixon said the response was greater than anticipated, and the collection sold out. She subsequently expanded Embellished’s headwear offerings to include satin-lined ribbed beanies.

=== Television ===
==== The Real Housewives of Potomac ====
Dixon joined the Bravo reality television series The Real Housewives of Potomac as an original cast member when the series premiered in January 2016. Her early storylines centered on her relationship with former NBA player Juan Dixon, whom she had divorced but continued to live with while raising their two sons. During the series, the couple reconciled and became engaged for a second time in the fifth season. They married in a private ceremony in Maryland in August 2022, with their sons and Robyn’s parents in attendance; the wedding was featured in the seventh season finale.

During the show’s later seasons, Dixon’s drew criticism viewers over her handling of reports that Juan Dixon had been unfaithful. Dixon acknowledged that Juan had communicated with another woman but initially chose not to discuss the matter extensively on the show. Her decision to discuss aspects of the relationship on Reasonably Shady, the podcast she co-hosted with Bryant, rather than on the show also contributed to criticism that Dixon was unwilling to show aspects of her personal life.

Following the season eight reunion in April 2024, Dixon confirmed that she had been fired from the series and would not return for its ninth season. Dixon said she was ultimately at peace with the decision, stating that she had a long run on the series and was grateful for the opportunity. Bravo executive and reunion host Andy Cohen praised Dixon for being honest with viewers about the nature of her exit.

In 2026, she returned to The Real Housewives of Potomac for its eleventh season as a friend of the cast, marking her first appearance on the series in a recurring capacity since her departure as a full-time cast member two years earlier.

==== The Traitors ====
In June 2024, Dixon was announced to join the cast of Peacock’s reality competition series The Traitors. Dixon competed as a Faithful on the third season of the series, which premiered in January 2025. She placed 17th out of 23 contestants after being murdered by the Traitors in the fifth episode. After she was eliminated, Dixon stated she suspected Boston Rob Mariano was a Traitor and said she would have targeted him at the next roundtable had she remained in the game.

=== Podcasting ===
Dixon and fellow The Real Housewives of Potomac cast member Gizelle Bryant launched the podcast Reasonably Shady in 2021. The podcast covers topics including relationships, popular culture, entrepreneurship, and their experiences on reality television. Dixon continued co-hosting the podcast after leaving The Real Housewives of Potomac in 2024.

Reasonably Shady was nominated for an NAACP Image Award for Outstanding Arts and Entertainment Podcast in 2022.

In 2023, rapper Eminem opposed Bryant and Dixon’s application to trademark the name Reasonably Shady, arguing that it could create confusion with his trademarks for Shady and Slim Shady. Bryant and Dixon contested the opposition, arguing that their trademark was not confusingly similar and that their services were unrelated to Eminem’s. The dispute remains ongoing before the Trademark Trial and Appeal Board.

=== Philanthropy ===
Dixon has served as a board member and director of the Holistic Life Foundation, a Baltimore-based nonprofit that provides wellness and mindfulness programs to children and adults in underserved communities. She joined the organization’s board in 2023.

== Personal life ==
Dixon met basketball player Juan Dixon while they were in high school and began dating in 1996. They married in 2005 and have two sons, Corey and Carter. The couple divorced in 2012 but continued living together and raising their children. They even continued sharing a bedroom, and their unconventional post-divorce relationship became part of Dixon’s storyline when The Real Housewives of Potomac premiered in 2016. Over the following years, they gradually reconciled and resumed their romantic relationship.

Dixon and Juan became engaged for a second time in December 2019. Their plans to remarry were delayed by the COVID-19 pandemic, the construction of their home, and issues involving Juan’s communication with another woman. Dixon said Juan had communicated with the woman through Instagram but denied that he had been unfaithful, and said that the couple had resolved the matter.

The couple obtained a marriage license in Maryland in August 2020. They initially planned to marry in Jamaica in July 2022 but abandoned those plans shortly before the ceremony. On August 24, 2022, Dixon and Juan married for a second time in an intimate ceremony at The Bayfront Club in Edgemere, Maryland, with their sons present.

== Filmography ==
Year	Title	Role
2009	Watch What Happens Live with Andy Cohen	Herself; guest
2013	Wolf Creek 2	Extra
2013	The Real Daytime	Herself
2013	Married to Medicine	Herself
2013	Entertainment Tonight	Herself
2016–2024; 2026	The Real Housewives of Potomac	Herself
2017	Never Fall in Love	Donna
2022	Sherri	Herself; guest
2023	The Traitors	Herself; contestant
2023	BravoCon Live with Andy Cohen!	Herself
