= Monique Samuels =

American television personality

- Born: Monique Cox; October 6, 1983 (age 43); Atlantic City, New Jersey, U.S.
- Occupation: Television personality
- Spouse: Chris Samuels (m. 2012; div. 2023)
- Children: 3
- Website: https://moniquesamuels.com

Monique Samuels (née Cox; born October 6, 1983) is an American television personality and entrepreneur. She is known for appearing as a cast member on the Bravo reality television series The Real Housewives of Potomac (2017–2020, 2025–present) and Love & Marriage: DC (2022).

She is the former wife of former professional football player Chris Samuels, with whom she shares three children.

== Early life and education ==
Samuels was born in Atlantic City, New Jersey. She grew up in Pleasantville, New Jersey, graduated from Pleasantville High School and briefly attended Duquesne University before dropping out to pursue a music career in Washington, D.C. In 2017, she attended the University of Alabama for a degree in business.

== Career ==
Samuels first gained notoriety in 2017 when she joined the main cast of the reality television series The Real Housewives of Potomac during its second season. During her marriage to Chris Samuels, Monique operated Samuels' real estate company, CRS Real Estate, the Chris Samuels Foundation, and Chris Samuels Enterprises. The same year, Samuels founded her parenting and lifestyle blog, Not For Lazy Moms, which later transitioned into a podcast.

Following a legal incident between Samuels and her RHOP co-star Candiace Dillard-Bassett, where in which both were charged with second-degree assault from the District Court of Montgomery County in Maryland from a physical altercation on October 16, 2019, Samuels departed the series following its fifth season in 2020. In December 2020, Samuels launched her essential oils line, Mila Eve Essentials.

In May 2022, Samuels, alongside her husband joined the Oprah Winfrey Network's series Love & Marriage: DC. In June 2025, People reported that Samuels would be returning to The Real Housewives of Potomac, in a "friend of" capacity for the tenth season.

== Personal life ==
Samuels met professional football offensive tackle Chris Samuels in 2003, while he was signed to the Washington Redskins. The couple married in March 2012, at the Ronald Reagan Building and International Trade Center in Washington, D.C. The couple have three children together, and previously resided in Potomac, Maryland. In April 2023, Samuels filed for divorce from Chris after 11 years of marriage, with the divorce being finalized on September 25, 2023.

== Filmography ==
Year	Title	Role	Notes	Ref.
2017–2020; 2025–present	The Real Housewives of Potomac	Herself	Main cast (seasons 2–5); recurring (season 10–)	
2022	Love & Marriage: DC	Herself	Main cast (season 1)	
