= Wendy Osefo =

Nigerian-American academic (born 1984)

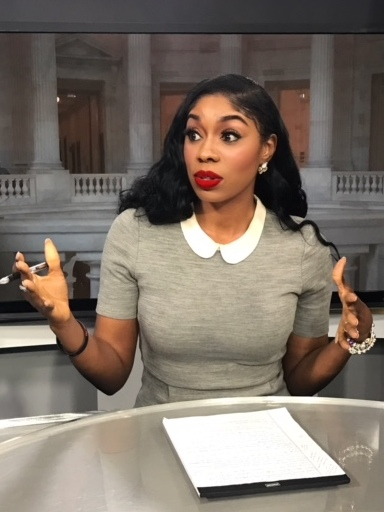
- Born: Wendy Onyinye Ozuzu; May 21, 1984 (age 42); Nigeria
- Spouse: Edward Osefo (m. 2011)
- Children: 3

Academic background
- Education: Temple University (BA); Johns Hopkins University (MA); Rutgers University–Camden (MS, PhD)
- Thesis: Engaging Low-Income Parents in Schools: Beyond the PTA Meeting (2016)
- Doctoral advisor: Gloria Bonilla-Santiago

Academic work
- Institutions: Johns Hopkins School of Education
- Website: Official website

Wendy Onyinye Osefo (née Ozuzu, born May 21, 1984) is a Nigerian American political commentator, public affairs academic, and television personality. She is a main cast member of The Real Housewives of Potomac. Wendy practices in the field of journalism and has received awards recognizing her contributions.

== Early life and education ==
Born to an Igbo family in Nigeria, Osefo immigrated to the United States with her family at the age of 3 to Durham, North Carolina before settling in Maryland.

Osefo earned a bachelor's degree in political science from Temple University and a Master of Arts degree in government from Johns Hopkins University. In 2012, Osefo completed a M.Sc. in public affairs with a concentration in community development from Rutgers University–Camden. In 2016, she became the first Black woman to earn a Ph.D. in public affairs and community development from Rutgers University-Camden. Her dissertation is entitled Engaging Low-Income Parents in Schools: Beyond the PTA Meeting. Gloria Bonilla-Santiago was Osefo's doctoral advisor.

== Career ==
Osefo is a contributor for The Hill, the founder and chief executive officer of 1954 Equity, and a former assistant professor at Johns Hopkins School of Education. In 2014, she served as the inaugural director of the Masters of Arts in Management Program at Goucher College.

She is a former board member for the late Congressman Elijah Cummings' Youth Program in Israel, the Children's Scholarship Fund Baltimore, and The Education Foundation of Baltimore County Schools.

In 2020, it was announced that Osefo had joined the fifth season of The Real Housewives of Potomac. In 2025, Osefo was set to star in the spin-off Wife Swap: The Real Housewives Edition. However, her episode was pulled following her arrest. On October 20, 2025, Bravo reversed their decision and rescheduled Osefo's episode.

== Awards and recognition ==
- In 2017, Osefo was named one of 12 Pan African Women to Watch by Face2Face Africa.
- She received the 2017 Outstanding Graduate Award from her alma mater, Johns Hopkins University.
- Also in 2017, she received the Distinguished Recent Alumni Award from The Johns Hopkins University.
- Osefo was named in the 2017 40 Under 40 class by the Baltimore Business Journal.
- The Baltimore Sun named Osefo as one of 25 Women to Watch.

== Personal life ==
In August 2011, she married Edward Osefo. The two reside in Finksburg, Maryland with their three children. Their relationship is regularly showcased on The Real Housewives of Potomac. The family is Catholic.

She is a member of Alpha Kappa Alpha sorority.

Osefo publicly supported Kamala Harris in the 2024 United States presidential election.

== Fraud charges ==
Osefo and her husband were arrested on October 10, 2025, and charged with 16 counts of insurance fraud. The charges stem from an alleged April 2024 burglary at the Osefos' home. The Osefos claimed that numerous luxury items were stolen, valuing them at $450,000. Deputies reportedly determined that many items actually had been returned to stores for refunds. After being booked, the Osefos were released on a $50,000 bond.
