= Karen Huger =

American television personality

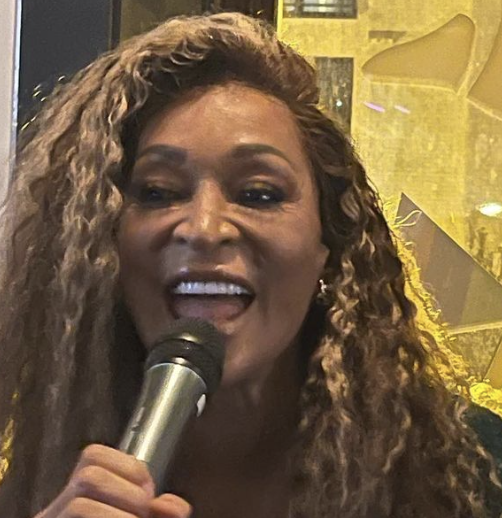
- Huger in 2022
- Born: Karen Wooden; May 3, 1963 (age 63); Spring Grove, Virginia, U.S.
- Occupation: Television personality
- Years active: 2016–present
- Known for: The Real Housewives of Potomac
- Spouses: Edmund E. Carter (divorced) Raymond Huger (m. 1996)
- Children: 2

Karen Huger (née Wooden; born May 3, 1963) is an American television personality. She is best known as a cast member on the reality TV series The Real Housewives of Potomac, serving as a housewife since the show's premiere in 2016.

== Career ==
In 2016, Karen Huger was announced as one of the six primary cast members to appear in the premiere season of Bravo's The Real Housewives of Potomac, which debuted on January 17, 2016.

In 2019, Huger invested into a perfume line, releasing La' Dame! The fragrance is sold in many different specialty and high-end stores, such as Bloomingdale's. Huger further expanded the brand offering by including a candle along with the fragrance.

In 2021, Huger was sworn in as the Surry County, Virginia, ambassador for tourism.

=== Karen's Grande Dame Reunion ===
In 2021, Bravo TV announced The Real Housewives of Potomac's first spin-off, Karen's Grande Dame Reunion, which premiered on April 17, 2022. The two-part special highlighted Huger's return to Surry County, Virginia, along with her husband and daughter, for a first-time family reunion. As detailed in the previews: "Karen Huger is about to have her first-ever family reunion, but it's not all fun and games…" Karen comes together with her family and learns about their history and lineage.

== Personal life ==
According to her bio on Bravo.com, Huger was born and raised in Spring Grove, Surry County, Virginia, "on a large family farm that has been in her family for more than 100 years". She spent the bulk of her childhood at the property, where she was raised by her father, Benjamin B. Wooden Jr.

On Thanksgiving morning, 2017, Huger's mother died due to kidney failure. Months after her mother's death, her father, too, died after a long battle with Alzheimer's disease.

== Legal issues ==
In March 2024, Huger was arrested for DUI and other charges stemming from an accident in which she crashed her Maserati into two signs and a median. Huger elected to take the case to trial and was convicted of DUI in December 2024. Huger was sentenced to two years in jail with one year suspended on February 26, 2025. In September 2025, after serving six months in prison, Huger was officially released.

== Filmography ==
Year	Title	Role	Notes
2016–present	The Real Housewives of Potomac	Self	Housewife (seasons 1–9, 11–) Special guest star (season 10)
2016–2025	Watch What Happens Live!	Self	6 episodes, guest
2019–2021	The Wendy Williams Show	Self	4 episodes, guest
2021	The Real Housewives of Atlanta	Self	1 episode, guest
2021	The Real	Self	1 episode
2022	Project Runway	Self	season 19
2022	Karen's Grande Dame Reunion	Self	Main cast member
2024	Sherri	Self	1 episode, guest
2025	Beyond the Gates	Self	1 episode, guest
