= Gizelle Bryant =

Reality television personality

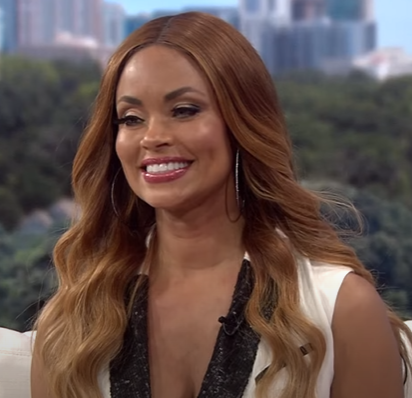
- Bryant in 2018
- Born: Gizelle Annette Graves; September 9, 1970 (age 56); Houston, Texas, U.S.
- Education: Hampton University (B.S.)
- Occupations: TV personality; podcaster; author; entrepreneur; actress
- Years active: 2016–present
- Known for: The Real Housewives of Potomac; The Real Housewives Ultimate Girls Trip
- Spouse: Jamal Bryant (m. 2002; div. 2009)
- Children: 3
- Parents: Curtis Graves (father); Joanne Graves (mother)

Gizelle Annette Bryant (née Graves; born September 9, 1970) is an American television personality, podcaster, author, entrepreneur and actress.

She is best known for her role as an original cast member of the reality television series The Real Housewives of Potomac, which premiered on Bravo in 2016. She is also the co-host of the podcast Reasonably Shady with her Real Housewives costar Robyn Dixon. She was formerly married to pastor Jamal Bryant and served as First Lady of Empowerment Temple AME.

== Early life ==
Bryant was born Gizelle Graves on September 9, 1970, in Houston, Texas, to Curtis Graves and Joanne Graves. She was born into a Creole family. Her father was a civil rights activist and politician who served in the Texas House of Representatives from 1967 to 1973.

Bryant attended Hampton University in Hampton, Virginia, graduating in 1992 with a bachelor’s degree in marketing. She credited her father with her decision to attend an HBCU. While at Hampton, she joined Alpha Kappa Alpha Sorority, Inc.

After finishing university Bryant worked for the NAACP under Kwesi Mfume.

== Career ==
=== Television ===
Bryant made her television debut as an original cast member of Bravo's reality television series The Real Housewives of Potomac when the series premiered in January 2016. The series follows the personal and professional lives of affluent women (Bryant and her friends) living in Potomac, Maryland, and the surrounding Washington, D.C., metropolitan area. Bryant has remained a main cast member of the series throughout its run.

Bryant has appeared in numerous Bravo spin-off series. In 2020, Bryant became a co-host of Bravo’s Chat Room, a talk show featuring personalities from the Real Housewives franchise. In 2023, she appeared alongside her fellow The Real Housewives of Potomac cast member Candiace Dillard Bassett in the third season of The Real Housewives Ultimate Girls Trip, which was filmed in Thailand. In 2025, Bryant appeared as a cast member on Bravo’s dating reality series Love Hotel. She returned to The Real Housewives Ultimate Girls Trip for Roaring 20th in 2026, joining Vicki Gunvalson, Luann de Lesseps, Teresa Giudice, Kyle Richards, Porsha Williams, and Lisa Barlow for the franchise’s 20th anniversary season.

In 2026, Bryant was announced as a contestant on the sixth season of the reality competition series The Traitors, scheduled to premiere on Peacock in January 2027. She is also set to star in and executive produce the BET drama Church Wives, which is scheduled to premiere on November 4, 2026.

Bryant has appeared at several editions of BravoCon, including the inaugural convention in 2019 and subsequent events in 2022, 2023, and 2025. Bryant has also made guest appearances on various television programs including The Drew Barrymore Show, The Kelly Clarkson Show, Live with Kelly and Mark, Sherri, The View and Would I Lie to You?

=== Podcasting ===
In 2021, Bryant and fellow The Real Housewives of Potomac cast member Robyn Dixon launched their podcast, Reasonably Shady, on the Black Effect Podcast Network. The podcast covers topics including relationships, motherhood, popular culture, entrepreneurship, and their experiences in reality television. Reasonably Shady was nominated for an NAACP Image Award for Outstanding Arts and Entertainment Podcast in 2022.

=== Book ===
Bryant’s novel My Word was published by Brown Girls Publishing on April 30, 2019. The novel follows Ginger Williams, the wife of a megachurch pastor, as she confronts her husband’s infidelity and the pressures surrounding his church. The story draws loosely on Bryant’s experiences as the former wife of a pastor. My Word received the African American Literary Award for Best Fiction.

=== Business ventures ===
During the mid-2000s, Bryant operated a dessert business called Sweet Gizelle, which supplied baked goods to restaurants in the Washington D.C. area, including those associated with chef Timothy Dean, a contestant on the seventh season of Top Chief.

Bryant founded EveryHue Beauty, a cosmetics company, in 2017. The company produced makeup and skincare products, including tinted moisturizer, concealer, setting powder, primer, highlighter, blush, and setting spray. EveryHue Beauty products were sold online and through Target as part of the company’s broader effort to include more beauty options for women of color. The company later ceased operations after its manufacturer closed during the COVID-19 pandemic.

Bryant subsequently entered the fashion industry with GnA, an athleisure brand founded with her The Real Housewives of Potomac costar Ashley Darby.

== Philanthropy ==
Bryant worked for the Birmingham City Council in Birmingham, Alabama. On behalf of the Environmental Protection Agency (EPA), she helped clean up a Superfund site where toxic soil had contaminated part of the city. Former Mayor William A.Bell presented Bryant with the Community Engagement Award in recognition of her contributions.

== Personal life ==
Bryant dated former professional basketball player Dennis Scott, who played for the Orlando Magic and accompanied her to her high school prom.

Bryant married pastor Jamal Harrison Bryant in 2002. They have three daughters: Grace and twins Adore and Angel, who have appeared periodically on The Real Housewives of Potomac. The couple separated in 2008 and divorced in 2009 following Bryant’s allegations that her husband had been unfaithful. Several years after their divorce, Bryant and Jamal Bryant resumed a romantic relationship. Their reconciliation and subsequent relationship were featured on The Real Housewives of Potomac before they ultimately ended their relationship.

After her divorce, Bryant dated former NBA player Sherman Douglas for approximately a year and a half. Their on-again, off-again relationship was documented on The Real Housewives of Potomac. After Bryant gave Douglas another chance following an earlier breakup, the relationship ended in 2019.

Bryant began dating Jason Cameron, a cast member of Bravo’s Winter House, in 2023. The two met through their mutual friends Ashley Darby and Luke Gulbranson, who introduced them during the 2022 BravoCon. Bryant described their relationship as casual and said that they dated intermittently. Cameron later appeared on The Real Housewives of Potomac during Bryant’s storyline. The two remained friends after their relationship ended.

In 2025, Bryant appeared on Bravo’s Love Hotel, a reality dating series in which she and three other Real Housewives cast members dated potential partners. On the series, she went on dates with several contestants, including Jason “Jay” Bramble, whom she selected for her first one-on-one date, Dr. Theo Goff, and Phil Westbrooks. Bryant ultimately chose Goff at the conclusion of the season, although their plans to reunite in New York City after filming did not materialize. She remained in contact with Westbrooks.

== Filmography ==
=== Television ===
Year	Show	Notes
2016 – 2026	The Real Housewives of Potomac	Main cast; 192 episodes
2016	Hollywood Today Live	1 episode
2016	The View	1 episode
2016 - 2026	Watch What Happens Live with Andy Cohen	31 episodes
2018	Steve	1 episode
2019	Sister Circle Live	1 episode
2019 - 2020	The Wendy Williams Show	2 episodes
2019 - 2026	The Real Housewives of Atlanta	4 episodes
2019 - 2021	Celebrity Page	2 episodes
2020	Race in America: A Movement Not a Moment	television special
2020	Race in America: Our Vote Counts	television special
2020 - 2021	Bravo's Chat Room	Host; 51 episodes
2020	The Real Housewives of Orange County	Episode: "The Lies That Bind"
2021	For Real: The Story of Reality TV	2 episodes
2021	Married to Medicine	Episode: "Let the Emoji's Fly"
2021	Entertainment Tonight	1 episode
2022	Project Runway	Episode: "The Housewives"
2022 - 2026	Sherri	3 episodes
2023	Live with Kelly and Mark	1 episode
2023 - 2026	The Real Housewives Ultimate Girls Trip	Main cast; 37 episodes
2023	The Breakfast Club on BET	1 episode
2023	Winter House	Episode: "Parental Advisory"
2023 - 2025	Bravocon Live with Andy Cohen	4 episodes
2024	The Drew Barrymore Show	1 episode
2024	The Kelly Clarkson Show	1 episode
2025	Love Hotel	Main cast; 8 episodes
2025	Beyond the Gates	1 episode, guest
2026	Today	2 episodes
2026	Church Wives	TBA
2027	The Traitors	Contestant; Season 6

=== Radio and podcasts ===
Year	Title	Notes
2023	My Pop's Culture	1 episode
2021 - Present	Reasonably Shady	Co-host
2020	Give Them Lala	1 episode
2017	Great Day Washington	1 episode
2017	The Domenick Nati Show	1 episode

=== Music videos ===
Year	Title	Artist	Role
2021	"Drive Back"	Candiace Dillard Bassett	Self

== Bibliography ==
- Bryant, Gizelle (April 30, 2019). My Way. Brown Girls Publishing. ISBN 978-1944359805.
