= Ashley Darby =

American television personality

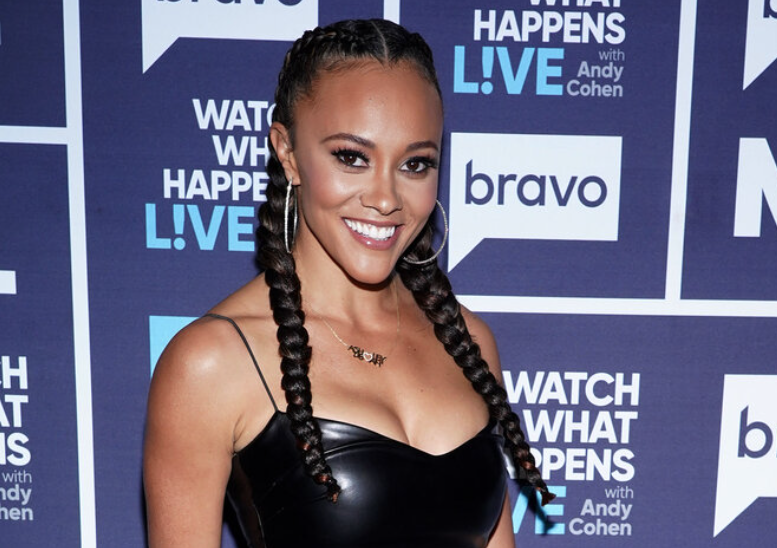
- Darby at WWHL in 2021
- Born: Ashley Boalch; June 8, 1988 (age 38); Silver Spring, Maryland, U.S.
- Education: The University of Maryland (BA)
- Occupations: Television personality; singer
- Spouse: Michael Darby (m. 2014; div. 2025)
- Children: 2
- Beauty pageant titleholder
- Title: Miss District of Columbia 2011
- Major competitions: Miss District of Columbia 2011 (Winner); Miss America 2012 (Unplaced)

Ashley Darby (née Boalch; born June 8, 1988) is an American reality television personality. She gained notability after winning Miss District of Columbia in 2011 and has been a main cast member of The Real Housewives of Potomac since the show's inception in January 2016.

== Early life and pageantry ==
Darby was raised by her single mother, Sheila Matthews, in Silver Spring, Maryland. She has two younger half-siblings: Zach Smith and Jessica. As a teenager, she often worked to help provide additional income for the family. Following high school graduation, Darby attended University of Maryland College Park and earned a degree in communications.

In 2011, Darby (then-Ashley Boalch), in her first pageant, was crowned Miss District of Columbia in the Miss America pageant system. She went on to represent the District of Columbia in the Miss America 2012 pageant, however failed to make the semifinals. Upon her win, she worked with the non-profit organization Network For Teaching Entrepreneurship, and became an ambassador for Children's Miracle Network.

== Career ==
Prior to television, Darby worked as a marketing intern at the Monument Realty agency in D.C., and as a bartender at one of her future husband's restaurants.

In 2015, Darby was announced as a main cast member of the Bravo reality series The Real Housewives of Potomac. Her first seasons focused extensively on her desire to have a child and efforts to successfully run the Australian-themed restaurant, Oz, owned by herself and her former husband. The restaurant floundered for nearly four years until its closure in June 2019.

In 2018, Darby released a single titled Coffee and Love produced by her brother.

In 2025, Darby starred alongside RHOP co-star Gizelle Byrant, Shannon Storms Beador (RHOC) and Luann de Lesseps (RHONY) in a Real Housewives spin-off Love Hotel.

== Personal life ==
Ashley Darby married Australian restaurateur and largescale realtor Michael Darby in May 2014.

She had her first son, Dean Michael Darby, on July 7, 2019. Darby was very public about her postpartum depression following her son's birth and shared she was experiencing "postpartum blues" within the first month.

Her second son, Dylan Matthew Darby, was born in March 2021.

The Darbys announced in April 2022 that they would be separating after almost eight years of marriage.

Awards and achievements
Preceded by Stephanie Williams	Miss District of Columbia; 2011	Succeeded by Allyn Rose
