= List of Philadelphia Flyers broadcasters =

This is a list of Philadelphia Flyers broadcasters.

== Television ==
Flyers games are broadcast on NBC Sports Philadelphia, NBC Sports Philadelphia Plus and NBC 10 with streaming available on Peacock.

=== Play-by-Play ===
- Gene Hart & Stu Nahan (1967–1968)
- Stu Nahan (1968–1971)
- Bill White (1970–71)
- Pat Shetler (1971–72)
- Gene Hart & Don Earle (1971–1977)
- Gene Hart (1977–1988, 1992–1995)
- Pete Silverman (1979–80)
- Don Tollefson (1982–84)
- Mike Emrick (1980–1983, 1988–1992)
- Jim Jackson (1995–present)

=== Color commentary ===
- Larry Zeidel (1971–72)
- Bobby Taylor (1976–1989)
- Bill Clement (1989–1992, 2007–2020)
- Gary Dornhoefer (1992–2006)
- Steve Coates (1999–2014)
- Keith Jones (2006–2023)
- Chris Therien (2014–2018)
- Scott Hartnell (2021–present)
- Brian Boucher (2021–present)
- Al Morganti (2022–2023, one game)

== Radio ==
Flyers games are broadcast on 97.5 WPEN and 93.3 WMMR throughout the Philadelphia metropolitan area, and on WENJ 97.3 in the Atlantic City area.

=== Play-by-Play ===
- Stu Nahan & Gene Hart (1967–1968)
- Hugh Gannon (1968–1971)
- Gene Hart & Don Earle (1971–1977)
- Ralph Lawler (1976–77)
- Gene Hart (1977–1992)
- Mike Emrick (1992–1993)
- Jim Jackson (1993–1995)
- Steve Carroll (1995–1996)
- John Wiedeman (1996–1997)
- Tim Saunders (1997–present)

=== Color commentary ===
- Ron Weber (1972–1974)
- Ralph Lawler (1974–1975)
- Hugh Gannon (1975–1976)
- Pete Silverman (1975–1977)
- Terry Crisp (1976–1977)
- Bobby Taylor (1976–1992)
- Steve Coates (1992–1999, 2014–2023)
- Brian Propp (1999–2008)
- Chris Therien (2008–2014)
- Todd Fedoruk (2023–Present)
