= Bill Clement =

Canadian ice hockey player (born 1950)

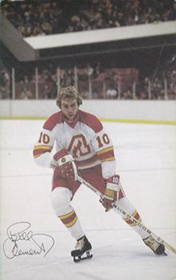
- Born: December 20, 1950 (age 75) Buckingham, Quebec, Canada
- Height: 6 ft 1 in (185 cm)
- Weight: 190 lb (86 kg; 13 st 8 lb)
- Position: Centre
- Shot: Left
- Played for: Philadelphia Flyers; Washington Capitals; Atlanta Flames; Calgary Flames
- NHL draft: 18th overall, 1970; Philadelphia Flyers
- Playing career: 1970–1982

William H. Clement (born December 20, 1950) is a Canadian-American former professional ice hockey player who became an author, speaker, actor, entrepreneur, and hockey broadcaster.

Clement played 11 seasons in the National Hockey League (NHL) and was named an All-Star twice. He spent his first four years with the Philadelphia Flyers, with whom he won two Stanley Cup championships (1974, 1975). Clement later played for the Washington Capitals, whom he captained, and the Flames, both in Atlanta and Calgary.

Clement has broadcast five different Olympic Games and has worked for ESPN, NBC, ABC, Versus, Comcast SportsNet and TNT in the U.S., and CTV, CBC, Rogers Sportsnet and SiriusXM Radio in Canada.

His acting credits include work on the ABC daytime drama All My Children and more than 300 television ads for clients such as Chevrolet, Bud Light, and Deepwoods Off. He was also one of the in-game announcers on EA Sports' NHL video games from NHL 07 through NHL 14, as well as on 2K Sports' NHL 2K series in ESPN NHL Hockey and ESPN NHL 2K5.

== Biography ==
=== Playing career ===
Before his career as a broadcaster, Clement was an amateur and NHL hockey player. Born in Buckingham, Quebec, he played hockey as a child in nearby Thurso with Guy Lafleur. He played Junior Hockey with the Ottawa 67s of the O.H.A., in their first three seasons.

Originally selected 18th (second round) in the 1970 NHL entry draft by the Philadelphia Flyers (the Flyers' first pick of the draft), Clement played four seasons with the Flyers (as well as in minor league teams at Quebec City and Richmond, VA), and was part of the Stanley Cup-winning Flyers teams of 1973–74 and 1974–75 as the 4th line Center. Before the 1975 NHL Amateur Draft, he was traded to the Washington Capitals for their right to draft Mel Bridgman, as the first overall draft pick that year. After playing just 46 games with the Capitals (and serving as the team captain) in the 1975–76 season, he was then traded to the Atlanta Flames for Gerry Meehan, Jean Lemieux and a Round 1 pick in the 1976 NHL Amateur Draft. He would play with the Flames organization in both Atlanta and Calgary, until his retirement following the 1981–82 NHL season. He played in two NHL All-Star Games, in 1976 and 1978. In 719 regular season games, he scored 148 goals, earned 206 assists, and 383 penalty minutes. In 50 playoff games, he collected five goals and three assists.

Clement was known for a calm and consistent passing game, leading to the rhyme "Clement, Clement, Hands of Cement." Bud Light referenced the old taunt in one of their popular "Hockey Falls" commercials.

=== Post-playing career ===
After retiring from hockey, Clement worked for many years as a lead color commentator for ESPN's NHL coverage, first with play-by-play man Mike Emrick from 1986–87 to 1987–88 and later with Gary Thorne from 1992–93 to 2003–04. The Thorne-Clement duo were the commentators for EA Sports' NHL 07 (Xbox 360 only), NHL 08 through NHL 14, and ESPN NHL 2K5 when ESPN had the license, Clement having previously provided the color commentary on EA's NHL series for NHL 2000 and NHL 2001, with Jim Hughson. The pair called the Stanley Cup Final for ESPN and every Stanley Cup win from 1993 through 2004, except for 1995; Mike Emrick and John Davidson were the broadcast team for the clinching game of that Finals series (which was aired on Fox). Davidson, who joined them as a third man in the booth for big games, did so for both Stanley Cup wins from 2003 through 2004. From 1988–89 until 1991–92 he worked for SportsChannel America as lead color commentator on their national and regional Philadelphia Flyers telecasts.

Clement worked with Jim Lampley as a studio analyst for CNBC during their coverage of both the men's and women's ice hockey tournaments at the 2002 Winter Olympics in Salt Lake City, and worked as the play-by-play announcer for table tennis, pentathlon events, and badminton tournaments for NBC at the 2004 and 2008 Summer Olympics. (Clement won province championships playing badminton in high school.) He also worked as an analyst at ESPN's Great Outdoor Games for several years.

He is also the host of a Flyers-based radio talk show on WBCB 1490 AM in Bucks County, Pennsylvania. The show includes current and former players and coaches, as well as players from the ECHL's Trenton Devils. He also continues to provide color commentary, as well as post-game show analysis, working several local Flyers broadcasts for NBC Sports Philadelphia and The Comcast Network since the 2007–08 season.

From 1986–2004, he broadcast at least one game of every Stanley Cup Final series (with ESPN from 1986–1988, SportsChannel America from 1989–1992, ESPN again from 1993–2004, and ABC from 2000–2004). After a lockout canceled the 2005 Finals, he worked the 2006 and 2007 Finals as the studio host for OLN and NBC. He continued his streak in 2008 as a color commentator for NHL Radio on Westwood One.

In January 2021, Clement announced his retirement from broadcasting at the age of 70. A year later, he and Al Morganti were inducted to Hockey Hall of Fame together, with him getting the Foster Hewitt Memorial Award for outstanding contributions as a hockey broadcaster while Morganti was presented with the Elmer Ferguson Memorial Award for his excellence in hockey journalism career.

== Personal life ==
After retirement from hockey, he married his current wife, Cissie, had two children, and resides in Solebury Township, Pennsylvania. His daughter Savanah graduated from The Hun School of Princeton in 2007, while his son Chase graduated from New Hope-Solebury High School in 2008 and went to Delaware Valley College where he played soccer as their goalkeeper and was First Team All Freedom Conference Player in 2012. Clement became a U.S. citizen on November 4, 2010.

Bill Clement was first married to Cathie (née Maclarty) of Ottawa, Ontario. They daughters Christa and Savannah, son, Chase and grandchildren.

== Career statistics ==
			Regular season					Playoffs
Season	Team	League	GP	G	A	Pts	PIM	GP	G	A	Pts	PIM
1967–68	Ottawa 67's	OHA-Jr.	38	6	19	25	41	—	—	—	—	—
1968–69	Ottawa 67's	OHA-Jr.	53	18	28	46	101	7	1	4	5	6
1969–70	Ottawa 67's	OHA-Jr.	54	19	36	55	62	5	2	0	2	0
1970–71	Quebec Aces	AHL	69	19	39	58	88	1	0	0	0	0
1971–72	Richmond Robins	AHL	26	8	9	17	20	—	—	—	—	—
1971–72	Philadelphia Flyers	NHL	49	9	14	23	39	—	—	—	—	—
1972–73	Philadelphia Flyers	NHL	73	14	14	28	51	2	0	0	0	0
1973–74	Philadelphia Flyers	NHL	39	9	8	17	34	4	1	0	1	4
1974–75	Philadelphia Flyers	NHL	68	21	16	37	42	12	1	0	1	8
1975–76	Washington Capitals	NHL	46	10	17	27	20	—	—	—	—	—
1975–76	Atlanta Flames	NHL	31	13	14	27	29	2	0	1	1	0
1976–77	Atlanta Flames	NHL	67	17	26	43	27	3	1	1	2	0
1977–78	Atlanta Flames	NHL	70	20	30	50	34	2	0	0	0	2
1978–79	Atlanta Flames	NHL	65	12	23	35	14	2	0	0	0	0
1979–80	Atlanta Flames	NHL	64	7	14	21	32	4	0	0	0	4
1980–81	Calgary Flames	NHL	78	12	20	32	33	16	2	1	3	6
1981–82	Calgary Flames	NHL	69	4	12	16	28	3	0	0	0	2
NHL totals			719	148	208	356	383	50	5	3	8	26

Preceded by Bobby Taylor; Keith Jones, Steve Coates, and Chris Therien	Philadelphia Flyers TV Color Commentator; 1989–1992; 2007–2021	Succeeded by Gary Dornhoefer; Keith Jones, Scott Hartnell, and Brian Boucher
Preceded by Gary Green	American Stanley Cup Final broadcasters 1986–2004 (paired John Davidson in 2003-2004)	Succeeded by John Davidson

Preceded by Doug Mohns	Washington Capitals captain 1975–76	Succeeded by Yvon Labre
