= Pleasantville, New Jersey =

City in Atlantic County, New Jersey, US

- City
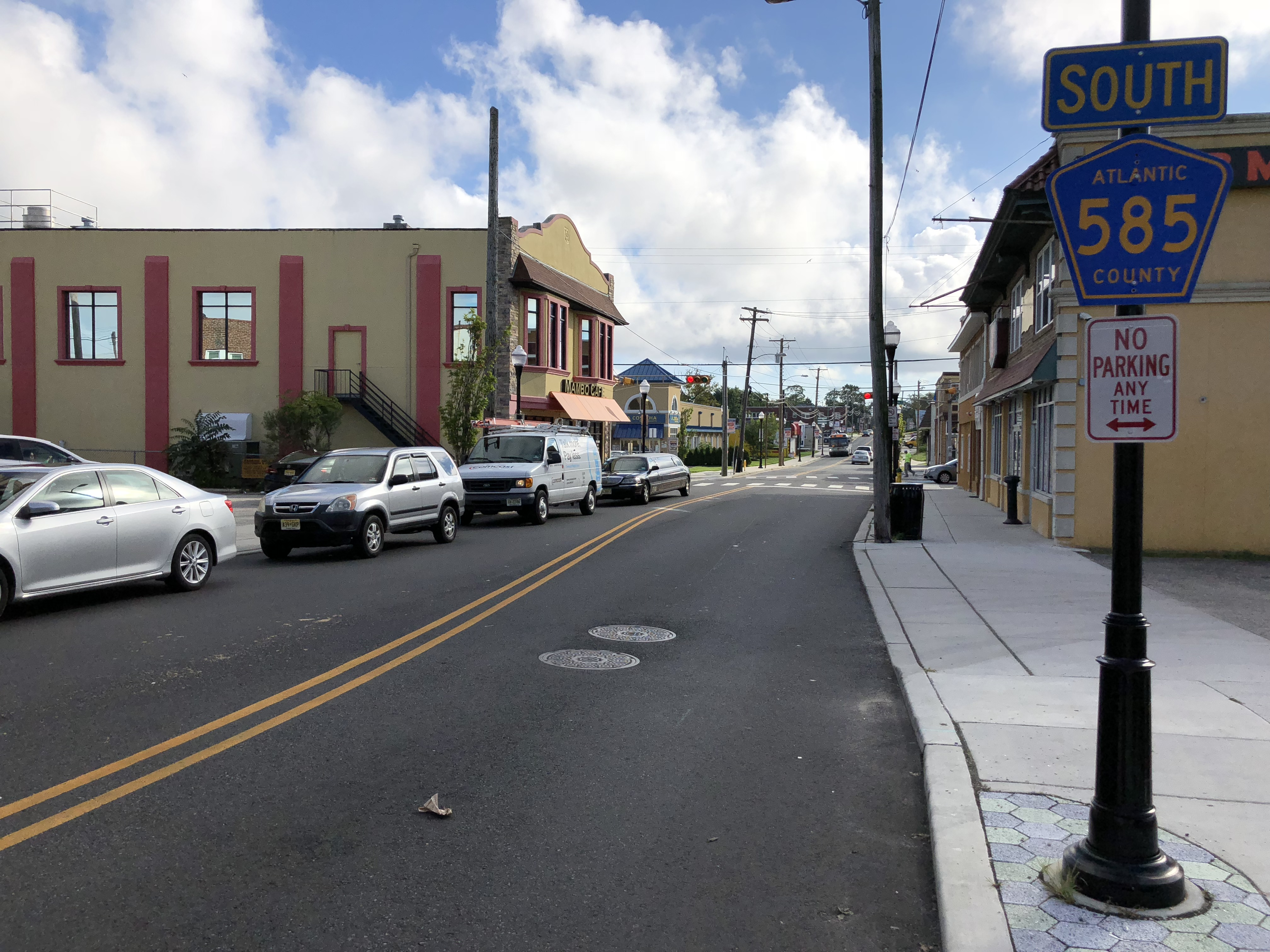
- Downtown Pleasantville along southbound CR 585 (Main Street)

- Logo

- Map of Pleasantville in Atlantic County. Inset: Location of Atlantic County highlighted in New Jersey.

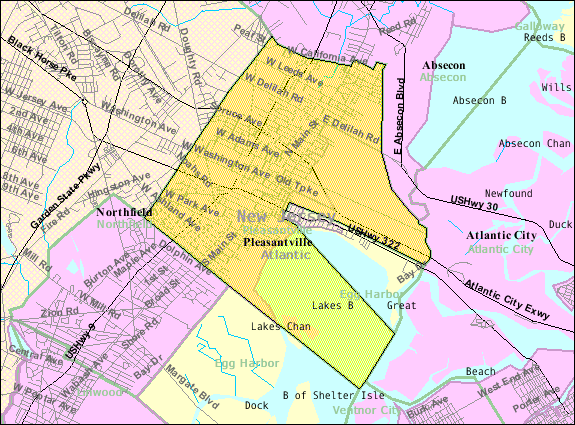
- Census Bureau map of Pleasantville, New Jersey

- Location in Atlantic County Location in New Jersey Location in the United States
- Coordinates: 39.388801°N 74.514288°W
- Country: United States
- State: New Jersey
- County: Atlantic
- Incorporated: January 10, 1889

Government
  - Type: City
  - Body: City Council
  - Mayor: Judy M. Ward (D, term ends December 31, 2024)
  - Administrator: Linda D. Peyton
  - Municipal clerk: Davinna P. King-Ali

Area
  - Total: 7.28 sq mi (18.86 km^{2})
  - Land: 5.72 sq mi (14.82 km^{2})
  - Water: 1.56 sq mi (4.05 km^{2}) 21.46%
  - Rank: 238th of 565 in state 16th of 23 in county
- Elevation: 7 ft (2.1 m)

Population (2020)
  - Total: 20,629
  - Estimate (2023): 20,613
  - Rank: 133rd of 565 in state 5th of 23 in county
  - Density: 3,605.8/sq mi (1,392.2/km^{2})
  - Rank: 186th of 565 in state 3rd of 23 in county
- Time zone: UTC−05:00 (Eastern (EST))
  - Summer (DST): UTC−04:00 (Eastern (EDT))
- ZIP Codes: 08232
- Area code: 609
- FIPS code: 3400159640
- GNIS feature ID: 0885356
- Website: www.pleasantville-nj.org

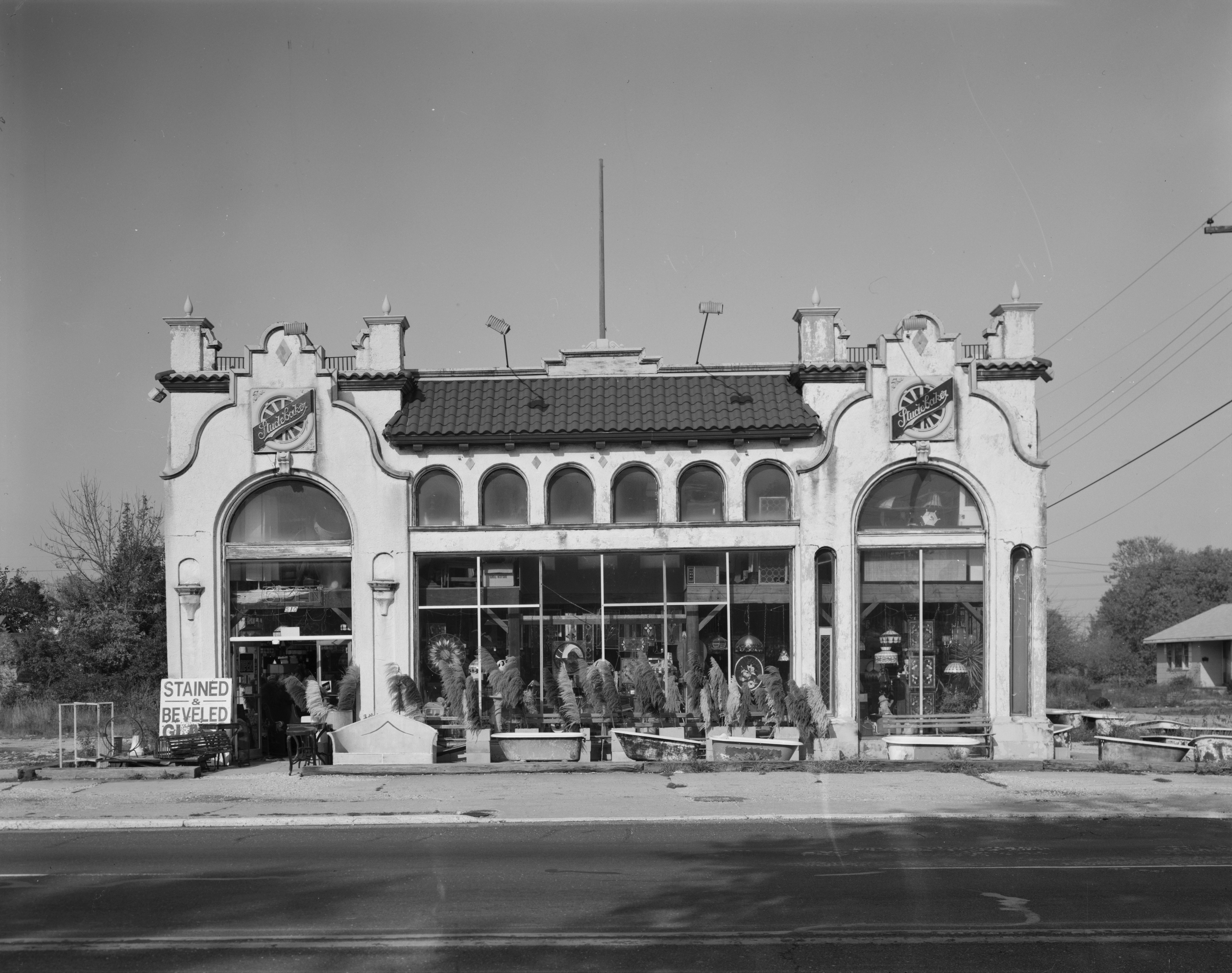
Studebaker car dealership in Pleasantville

Pleasantville is a city in Atlantic County, in the U.S. state of New Jersey. As of the 2020 United States census, the city's population was 20,629, its highest decennial count ever and an increase of 380 (+1.9%) from the 2010 census count of 20,249, which in turn reflected an increase of 1,237 (+6.5%) from the 19,012 counted in the 2000 census.

Geographically, the city, and all of Atlantic County, is part of the South Jersey region of the state and of the Atlantic City-Hammonton metropolitan statistical area, which in turn is included in the Philadelphia metropolitan area.

Pleasantville was originally incorporated as a borough by an act of the New Jersey Legislature on January 10, 1889, from portions of Egg Harbor Township, based on the results of a referendum held on December 15, 1888. Pleasantville was incorporated as a city on April 14, 1914, replacing Pleasantville borough, based on the results of a referendum held that same day. the city was named by David Ingersoll for its surroundings.

The city had the eighth-highest property tax rate in New Jersey, with an equalized rate of 4.903% in 2020, compared to 2.560% in the county as a whole and a statewide average of 2.279%.

== Geography ==
According to the U.S. Census Bureau, the city had a total area of 7.28 square miles (18.86 km^{2}), including 5.72 square miles (14.82 km^{2}) of land and 1.56 square miles (4.05 km^{2}) of water (21.46%). Unincorporated communities, localities and place names located partially or completely within the city include Mount Pleasant, Risleyville and Smiths Landing.

The city borders the Atlantic County municipalities of Absecon, Atlantic City, Egg Harbor Township, Northfield and Ventnor City.

== Demographics ==
Historical population
Census	Pop.	Note	%±
1900	2,182		—
1910	4,390		101.2%
1920	5,887		34.1%
1930	11,580		96.7%
1940	11,050		−4.6%
1950	11,938		8.0%
1960	15,172		27.1%
1970	14,007		−7.7%
1980	13,435		−4.1%
1990	16,027		19.3%
2000	19,012		18.6%
2010	20,249		6.5%
2020	20,629		1.9%
2023 (est.)	20,613		−0.1%
Population sources: 1900–2000; 1900–1920 1900–1910; 1900–1930 1940–2000; 2000 2010 2020

=== Racial and ethnic composition ===
Pleasantville city, New Jersey – racial and ethnic composition Note: the US Census treats Hispanic/Latino as an ethnic category. This table excludes Latinos from the racial categories and assigns them to a separate category. Hispanics/Latinos may be of any race.
Race / ethnicity (NH = Non-Hispanic)	Pop. 2000	Pop. 2010	Pop. 2020	% 2000	% 2010	% 2020
White alone (NH)	3,402	2,332	2,075	17.89%	11.52%	10.06%
Black or African American alone (NH)	10,572	8,615	7,186	55.61%	42.55%	34.83%
Native American or Alaska Native alone (NH)	25	48	29	0.13%	0.24%	0.14%
Asian alone (NH)	357	480	433	1.88%	2.37%	2.10%
Pacific Islander alone (NH)	3	2	4	0.02%	0.01%	0.02%
Other race alone (NH)	34	74	102	0.18%	0.37%	0.49%
Mixed race or multiracial (NH)	461	384	484	2.42%	1.90%	2.35%
Hispanic or Latino (any race)	4,158	8,314	10,316	21.87%	41.06%	50.01%
Total	19,012	20,249	20,629	100.00%	100.00%	100.00%

=== 2020 census ===
As of the 2020 census, Pleasantville had a population of 20,629. The median age was 36.2 years. 24.5% of residents were under the age of 18 and 13.2% of residents were 65 years of age or older. For every 100 females there were 91.7 males, and for every 100 females age 18 and over there were 88.4 males age 18 and over.

99.7% of residents lived in urban areas, while 0.3% lived in rural areas.

There were 7,252 households in Pleasantville, of which 35.1% had children under the age of 18 living in them. Of all households, 30.8% were married-couple households, 21.5% were households with a male householder and no spouse or partner present, and 37.4% were households with a female householder and no spouse or partner present. About 28.8% of all households were made up of individuals and 10.9% had someone living alone who was 65 years of age or older.

There were 7,856 housing units, of which 7.7% were vacant. The homeowner vacancy rate was 2.5% and the rental vacancy rate was 6.2%.

Racial composition as of the 2020 census
Race	Number	Percent
White	3,063	14.8%
Black or African American	7,633	37.0%
American Indian and Alaska Native	247	1.2%
Asian	449	2.2%
Native Hawaiian and Other Pacific Islander	13	0.1%
Some other race	6,431	31.2%
Two or more races	2,793	13.5%
Hispanic or Latino (of any race)	10,316	50.0%

=== 2010 census ===
The 2010 United States census counted 20,249 people, 6,661 households and 4,569 families in the city. The population density was 3,556.5 per square mile (1,373.2/km^{2}). There were 7,219 housing units at an average density of 1,267.9 per square mile (489.5/km^{2}). The racial makeup was 24.33% (4,926) White, 45.94% (9,303) Black or African American, 0.83% (168) Native American, 2.42% (490) Asian, 0.03% (6) Pacific Islander, 22.00% (4,454) from other races and 4.45% (902) from two or more races. Hispanic or Latino people of any race were 41.06% (8,314) of the population.

Of the 6,661 households, 34.3% had children under the age of 18; 33.3% were married couples living together; 26.5% had a female householder with no husband present and 31.4% were non-families. Of all households, 25.0% were made up of individuals and 8.4% had someone living alone who was 65 years of age or older. The average household size was 2.99 and the average family size was 3.53.

27.5% of the population were under the age of 18, 11.1% from 18 to 24, 27.1% from 25 to 44, 23.5% from 45 to 64 and 10.7% who were 65 years of age or older. The median age was 33.0 years. For every 100 females, the population had 92.0 males. For every 100 females ages 18 and older there were 87.2 males.

The Census Bureau's 2006–2010 American Community Survey showed that (in 2010 inflation-adjusted dollars) median household income was $39,560 (with a margin of error of +/− $4,092) and the median family income was $48,873 (+/− $5,405). Males had a median income of $32,494 (+/− $4,209) versus $29,961 (+/− $2,187) for females. The per capita income for the borough was $18,527 (+/− $1,356). About 12.2% of families and 18.2% of the population were below the poverty line, including 24.7% of those under age 18 and 32.3% of those age 65 or over.

== Economy ==
Portions of the city are part of an Urban Enterprise Zone (UEZ), one of 32 zones covering 37 municipalities statewide. Pleasantville was selected in 1994 as one of a group of 10 zones added to participate in the program and one of four of those chosen based on a competition. In addition to other benefits to encourage employment and investment within the UEZ, shoppers can take advantage of a reduced 3.3125% sales tax rate (half of the 6 5/8% rate charged statewide) at eligible merchants. Established in March 1995, the city's Urban Enterprise Zone status expires in March 2026. By 2019, there had been 169 businesses that had been certified to participate in the city's UEZ program.

== Sports ==
In 1945, the Boston Red Sox held their spring training at Ansley Field in Pleasantville, rather than in Florida, due to travel restrictions related to World War II. The New York Yankees were based at Bader Field in Atlantic City and the two clubs played a series of eight exhibition games against each other with wartime restrictions in intercity travel in place.

Laoma Byrd's Gym, formally known as the South Jersey Athletic Club, operated professionally from the mid-1940s to 1960s. This gym, which was located on West Wright Street, became a tourist destination after it was adapted as a boxing gym by top amateurs and pro fighters. Many noted boxers had trained there, including Ezzard Charles, Jersey Joe Walcott, Sonny Liston, Johnny Bratton, Johnny Saxton, Ike Williams, Ernie Terrell and numerous professional fighters from the local area.

== Parks and recreation ==
Portions of the right-of-way of the Atlantic City and Shore Railroad, running for 6 miles (9.7 km) between Pleasantville and Somers Point have been repurposed as the Somers Point Bike Path.

== Government ==
=== Local government ===
Pleasantville operates under the city form of New Jersey municipal government, one of 15 municipalities (of the 564) statewide that use this traditional form of government. The governing body is comprised of the mayor and the seven-member city council, all of whom are elected in partisan elections as part of the November general election. The mayor is elected to a four-year term of office. The city council includes one member elected at-large and six members elected from each of two wards to three-year terms of office on a staggered basis, with two seats up for election each year in a three-year cycle.

Augustus Harmon was appointed in November 2011 to fill the seat of his brother, Johnson Harmon, who died before the election in which he had won a fifth term of office.

In September 2016, the City Council appointed Nolan Q. Allen to fill the Ward 1 seat expiring in December 2017 that had been held by Lincoln Green Sr. until his death the previous month. Allen served on an interim basis until the November 2016 general election, when he was chosen to serve the balance of the term.

As of 2023, the mayor of the City of Pleasantville is Democrat Judy Ward, whose term of office ends December 31, 2024. Members of the city council are Council President Ricky Cistrunk (D, 2023; Ward 1), James D. Barclay (D, 2025; Ward 1), Victor M. Carmona (D, 2025; Ward 2), Bertilio "Bert" Correa (D, 2024; Ward 2), Lawrence "Tony" Davenport (D, 2024; Ward 1), Joanne Famularo (D, 2023; Ward 2) and Carla Thomas (D, 2023; at-large).

=== Federal, state and county representation ===
Pleasantville is located in the 2nd Congressional District and is part of New Jersey's 2nd state legislative district.

For the 119th United States Congress, New Jersey's 2nd congressional district is represented by Jeff Van Drew (R, Dennis Township). New Jersey is represented in the United States Senate by Democrats Cory Booker (Newark, term ends 2027) and Andy Kim (Moorestown, term ends 2031).

For the 2026–2027 session, the 2nd legislative district of the New Jersey Legislature is represented in the New Jersey Senate by Vincent J. Polistina (R, Egg Harbor Township) and in the General Assembly by Don Guardian (R, Atlantic City) and Maureen Rowan (D, Atlantic City).

Atlantic County is governed by a directly elected county executive and a nine-member Board of County Commissioners, responsible for legislation. The executive serves a four-year term and the commissioners are elected to staggered three-year terms, of which four are elected from the county on an at-large basis and five of the commissioners represent equally populated districts. As of 2025, Atlantic County's Executive is Dennis Levinson (R, Northfield), whose term of office ends December 31, 2027. Members of the Board of County Commissioners are:

Ernest D. Coursey (D, District 1-- Atlantic City, Egg Harbor Township (part), Longport, Margate City, and Ventnor City; 2025, Atlantic City), Chair Maureen Kern (R, District 2-- Egg Harbor Township (part), Linwood, Northfield, Somers Point and Pleasantville; 2027, Somers Point), Andrew Parker III (R, District 3-- Egg Harbor Township (part) and Hamilton Township (part); 2026, Egg Harbor Township), Richard R. Dase (R, District 4, including Brigantine, Galloway Township, Egg Harbor Township (part), and Port Republic; 2025, Galloway Township), Vice Chair James A. Bertino (R, District 5-- Buena, Buena Vista Township, Corbin City, Egg Harbor City, Estell Manor, Folsom, Hamilton Township (part), Hammonton, Mullica Township and Weymouth Township; 2027, Hammonton), June Byrnes (R, At-Large; 2026, Linwood), Michael Ruffu (R, At-Large; Margate, 2027) Amy L. Gatto (R, At-large; 2025, Hamilton Township) and John W. Risley (R, At-Large; 2026, Egg Harbor Township)

Atlantic County's constitutional officers are: Clerk Joesph J. Giralo (R, 2026, Hammonton), Sheriff Joe O'Donoghue (R, 2026, Egg Harbor Township) and Surrogate James Curcio (R, 2025, Hammonton).

=== Politics ===
As of March 2011, there were a total of 9,193 registered voters in Pleasantville City, of which 4,693 (51.0% vs. 30.5% countywide) were registered as Democrats, 534 (5.8% vs. 25.2%) were registered as Republicans and 3,965 (43.1% vs. 44.3%) were registered as Unaffiliated. There was one voter registered to another party. Among the city's 2010 Census population, 45.4% (vs. 58.8% in Atlantic County) were registered to vote, including 62.6% of those ages 18 and over (vs. 76.6% countywide).

Gubernatorial election results for Pleasantville
Year	Republican		Democratic		Third party(ies)	
Year	No.	%	No.	%	No.	%
2025	645	15.95%	3,335	82.47%	64	1.58%
2021	682	24.35%	2,093	74.72%	26	0.93%
2017	188	8.78%	1,905	88.94%	49	2.29%
2013	675	25.40%	1,951	73.40%	32	1.20%
2009	370	14.34%	2,146	83.18%	64	2.48%
2005	345	13.63%	2,126	83.97%	61	2.41%

In the 2012 presidential election, Democrat Barack Obama received 5,675 votes (92.4% vs. 57.9% countywide), ahead of Republican Mitt Romney with 450 votes (7.3% vs. 41.1%) and other candidates with 23 votes (0.4% vs. 0.9%), among the 6,139 ballots cast by the city's 10,019 registered voters, for a turnout of 61.3% (vs. 65.8% in Atlantic County). In the 2008 presidential election, Democrat Barack Obama received 5,945 votes (89.7% vs. 56.5% countywide), ahead of Republican John McCain with 597 votes (9.0% vs. 41.6%) and other candidates with 22 votes (0.3% vs. 1.1%), among the 6,628 ballots cast by the city's 10,572 registered voters, for a turnout of 62.7% (vs. 68.1% in Atlantic County). In the 2004 presidential election, Democrat John Kerry received 4,301 votes (80.9% vs. 52.0% countywide), ahead of Republican George W. Bush with 900 votes (16.9% vs. 46.2%) and other candidates with 31 votes (0.6% vs. 0.8%), among the 5,316 ballots cast by the city's 8,942 registered voters, for a turnout of 59.4% (vs. 69.8% in the whole county).

Presidential election results
Year	Republican	Democratic	Third parties
2024	22.1% 1,273	75.8% 4,372	2.1% 97
2020	14.8% 1,024	84.6% 5,872	0.6% 39
2016	9.5% 499	88.7% 5,634	1.8% 94
2012	7.3% 450	92.4% 5,675	0.4% 23
2008	9.0% 597	89.7% 5,945	0.3% 22
2004	16.9% 900	80.9% 4,301	0.6% 31

In the 2013 gubernatorial election, Democrat Barbara Buono received 1,951 ballots cast (69.1% vs. 34.9% countywide), ahead of Republican Chris Christie with 675 votes (23.9% vs. 60.0%) and other candidates with 32 votes (1.1% vs. 1.3%), among the 2,824 ballots cast by the city's 10,324 registered voters, yielding a 27.4% turnout (vs. 41.5% in the county). In the 2009 gubernatorial election, Democrat Jon Corzine received 2,146 ballots cast (82.0% vs. 44.5% countywide), ahead of Republican Chris Christie with 370 votes (14.1% vs. 47.7%), Independent Chris Daggett with 45 votes (1.7% vs. 4.8%) and other candidates with 19 votes (0.7% vs. 1.2%), among the 2,617 ballots cast by the city's 9,844 registered voters, yielding a 26.6% turnout (vs. 44.9% in the county).

United States Senate election results for Pleasantville1
Year	Republican		Democratic		Third party(ies)	
Year	No.	%	No.	%	No.	%
2024	986	19.38%	3,951	77.67%	150	2.95%
2018	444	12.59%	2,898	82.14%	186	5.27%
2012	396	7.09%	5,119	91.61%	73	1.31%
2006	416	15.11%	2,287	83.07%	50	1.82%

United States Senate election results for Pleasantville2
Year	Republican		Democratic		Third party(ies)	
Year	No.	%	No.	%	No.	%
2020	852	13.06%	5,365	82.22%	308	4.72%
2014	267	9.37%	2,534	88.91%	49	1.72%
2013	164	8.79%	1,682	90.19%	19	1.02%
2008	535	9.59%	4,962	88.96%	81	1.45%

== Education ==
Students in pre-kindergarten through twelfth grade are educated by the Pleasantville Public Schools. The district is one of 31 former Abbott districts statewide that were established pursuant to the decision by the New Jersey Supreme Court in Abbott v. Burke which are now referred to as "SDA Districts" based on the requirement for the state to cover all costs for school building and renovation projects in these districts under the supervision of the New Jersey Schools Development Authority.

As of the 2021–22 school year, the district, comprised of six schools, had an enrollment of 3,743 students and 316.4 classroom teachers (on an FTE basis), for a student–teacher ratio of 11.8:1. Schools in the district (with 2021–22 enrollment data from the National Center for Education Statistics) are Decatur Avenue Early Childhood Center with NA students in grade PreK, Leeds Avenue School with 567 students in grades PreK-5, North Main Street School with 308 students in grades PreK-5, South Main Street School with 478 students in grades PreK-5, Washington Avenue School with 407 students in grades K-5, Pleasantville Middle School with 847 students in grades 6-8 and Pleasantville High School with 893 students in grades 9-12. Students from Absecon attend the district's high school for ninth through twelfth grades as part of a sending/receiving relationship with the Absecon Public School District. Absecon has sought to end its agreement with Pleasantville and send its students to Absegami High School under a new sending/receiving relationship with the Greater Egg Harbor Regional High School District that Absecon argues would give its students a better education at a lower cost, without negatively impacting the demographics in Pleasantville High School. About 10% of Absecon's graduating students have been choosing to attend Pleasantville High School, for which the Absecon district has been paying $18,000 per student each year.

City public school students are also eligible to attend the Atlantic County Institute of Technology in the Mays Landing section of Hamilton Township or the Charter-Tech High School for the Performing Arts, located in Somers Point.

On September 6, 2007, the FBI arrested five members of the Pleasantville school board as part of a federal corruption case that included several state lawmakers and other public officials. Included in the arrest sweep were Assemblymen Mims Hackett and Alfred E. Steele, and Passaic Mayor Samuel Rivera. Indictments were filed against four sitting members of the Board of Education, charging that they had accepted bribes to steer insurance or roofing business from the district. Charged were Jayson Adams (accused of accepting $15,000 in bribes), James McCormick ($3,500), James Pressley ($32,200) and Rafael Velez ($4,000). Former board member Maurice 'Pete' Callaway, a member of the Pleasantville City Council, was accused of accepting $13,000 in bribes as part of the scheme.

== Transportation ==
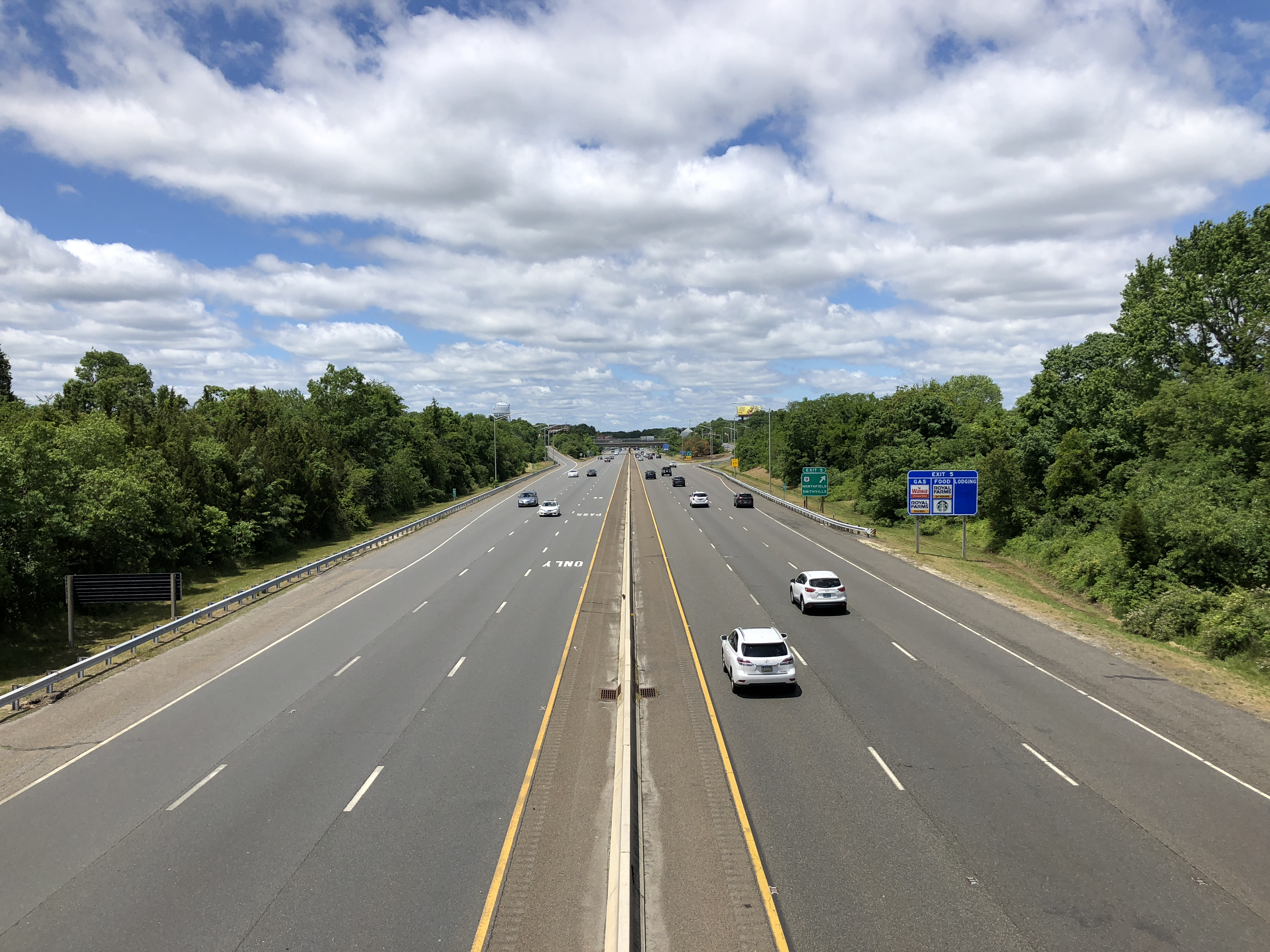
Atlantic City Expressway heading west in Pleasantville

=== Roads and highways ===
As of May 2010, the city had a total of 68.28 miles (109.89 km) of roadways, of which 53.12 miles (85.49 km) were maintained by the municipality, 7.70 miles (12.39 km) by Atlantic County and 4.26 miles (6.86 km) by the New Jersey Department of Transportation and 3.20 miles (5.15 km) by the South Jersey Transportation Authority.

Highways that pass through Pleasantville include U.S. Route 9, U.S. Route 40, U.S. Route 322 and the Atlantic City Expressway.

=== Public transportation ===
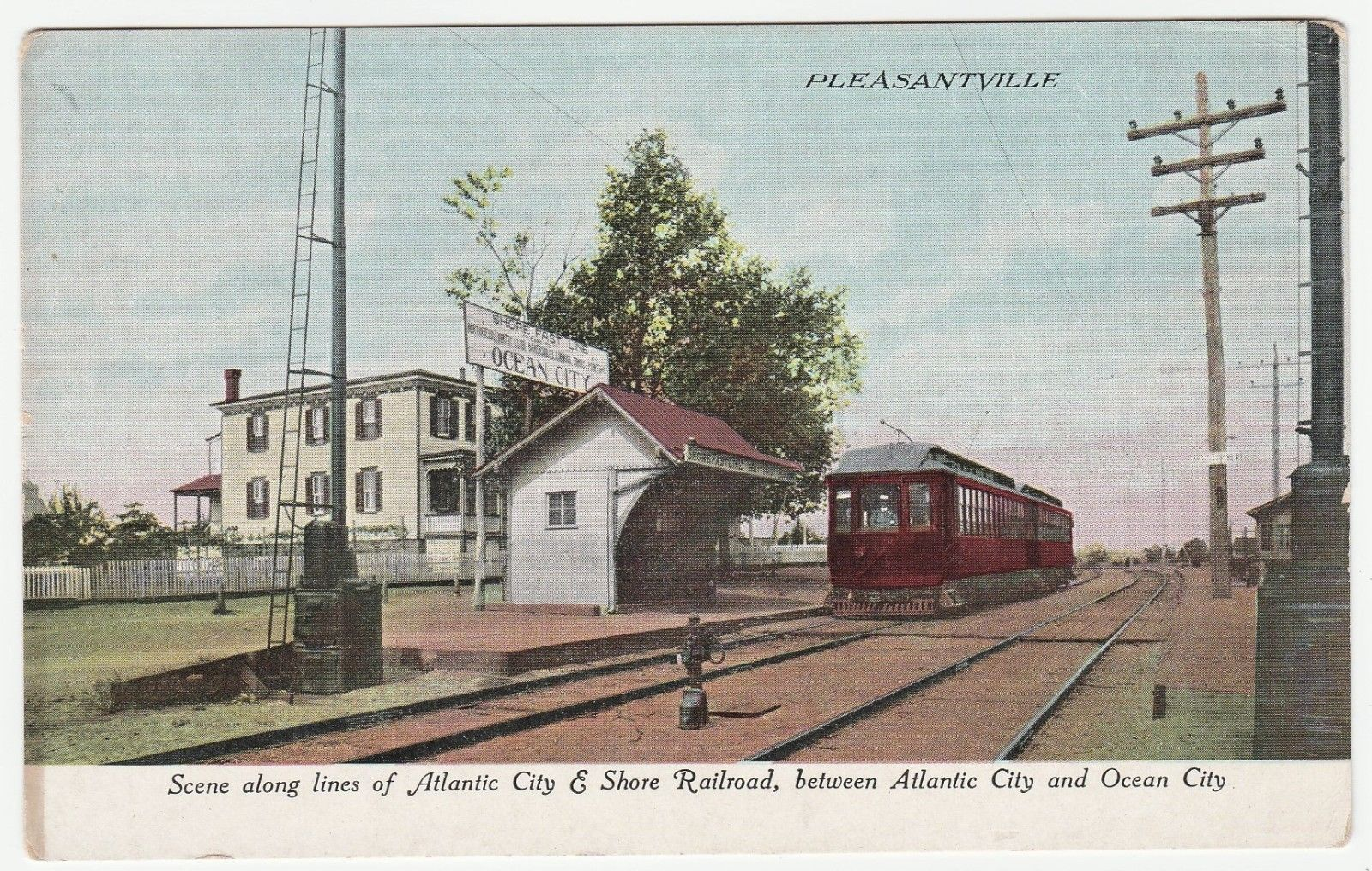
Pleasantville railroad stop on Atlantic City and Shore Railroad in 1912–1913

NJ Transit offers bus service to Atlantic City, New Jersey and other intermediate stations on routes 502 (from Atlantic Cape Community College), 507 (from Ocean City), 508 (from Hamilton Mall), 509 (from Ocean City), 553 (limited; from Upper Deerfield Township), 554 (from Lindenwold station) and 559 (from Lakewood Township).

Beginning in 1907, the Atlantic City and Shore Railroad provided electric interurban service to Pleasantville on its Atlantic City–Ocean City line. The railroad discontinued operation in 1948.

== Notable people ==
People who were born in, residents of, or otherwise closely associated with Pleasantville include:

- Nia Ali (born 1988), track and field athlete, who specializes in the 100 m hurdles, heptathlon and other events
- Ellen Bass (born 1947), poet and author
- Sonora Webster Carver (1904–2003), first female horse diver
- Walter Evans Edge (1873–1956), politician who served as a United States senator representing New Jersey from 1919 to 1929 and as governor of New Jersey, from 1917 to 1919 and again from 1944 to 1947
- Tom Foley, politician who represented the 2nd legislative district in the New Jersey General Assembly from 1994 to 1996
- Dino Hall (born 1955), former American football running back and return specialist who played in the NFL for the Cleveland Browns
- Gene Hart (1931–1999), sports announcer for the Philadelphia Flyers of the National Hockey League and the Philadelphia Phantoms of the American Hockey League
- Ty Helfrich (1890–1955), former major league baseball player
- Rodney Jerkins (born 1977), Grammy Award-winning songwriter, record producer and musician
- Amy Kennedy (born 1978), educator, mental health advocate and politician who is the Democratic Party nominee in the 2020 elections seeking to represent New Jersey's 2nd congressional district
- Simon Lake (1866–1945), mechanical engineer and naval architect
- Max Manning (1918–2003), pitcher in Negro league baseball who played for the Newark Eagles between 1938 and 1949
- Bette Nash (c. 1936–2024), flight attendant who worked for American Airlines for 67 years and was the longest-serving flight attendant in the world at the time of her death
- Sa'eed Nelson (born 1998), professional basketball player for Antranik of the Lebanese Basketball League
- Osun Osunniyi (born 1998), college basketball player for the St. Bonaventure Bonnies of the Atlantic 10 Conference
- Ralph Peterson Jr. (born 1962), jazz drummer and bandleader
- Blue Raspberry (born 1972 as Candi Lindsey), singer affiliated with Wu-Tang Clan
- Monique Samuels (born 1983), television personality best known as a cast member of the reality television series The Real Housewives of Potomac
- Jay Versace (born 1998), Grammy Award-winning record producer and former internet personality/comedian
- Dave Vonner (born 1972), toy designer
