= Gary Dornhoefer =

Canadian ice hockey player (born 1943)

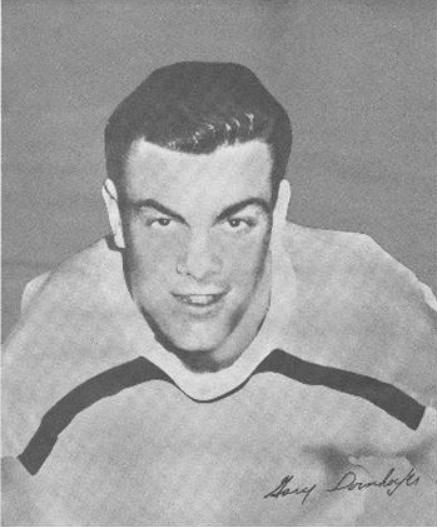
- Dornhoefer in 1968 card
- Born: February 2, 1943 (age 83) Kitchener, Ontario, Canada
- Height: 6 ft 1 in (185 cm)
- Weight: 175 lb (79 kg; 12 st 7 lb)
- Position: Right wing
- Shot: Right
- Played for: Boston Bruins; Philadelphia Flyers
- Playing career: 1963–1978

Gerhardt Otto Dornhoefer (born February 2, 1943), better known as Gary Dornhoefer, is a Canadian former professional ice hockey right winger who played 14 seasons in the National Hockey League (NHL) for the Boston Bruins and Philadelphia Flyers. He was a member of the Flyers' back-to-back Stanley Cup championship teams in 1974 and 1975.

== Playing career ==
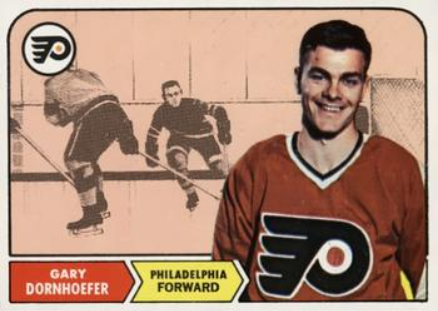
1968-69 Topps card of Dornhoefer for Philadelphia Flyers

After playing his junior hockey with the Niagara Falls Flyers of the Ontario Hockey Association, Dornhoefer made his NHL debut with the Boston Bruins in the 1964 season, playing in 32 games, scoring twelve goals and ten assists. After that promising start, he played poorly to start the next season and was little used by Boston thereafter, spending most of the next three seasons in the minor leagues, principally with the Hershey Bears of the American Hockey League.

=== Philadelphia Flyers ===
Dornhoefer was left unprotected in the 1967 NHL Expansion Draft. The Philadelphia Flyers selected him with the 13th pick overall, and he would never play with another team.

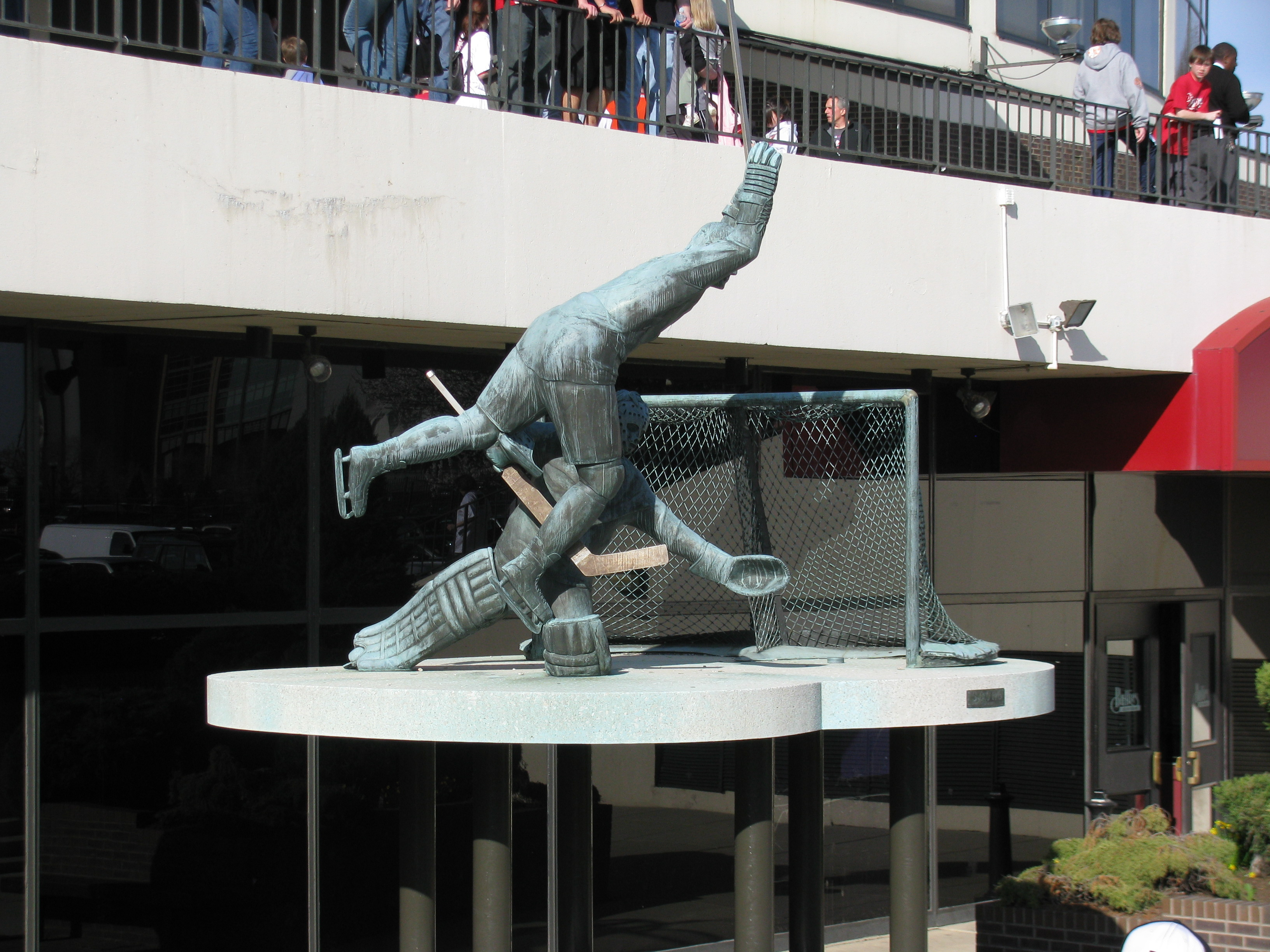
Statue depicting Dornhoefer's overtime goal during the 1973 Stanley Cup playoffs.

In that first year with Philadelphia, Dornhoefer scored 13 goals and 43 points while accumulating 134 penalty minutes and gaining a reputation as a hard hitting, grinding left winger with a touch for scoring. Two seasons later he reached the 20-goal plateau for the first time, a mark he would achieve in five seasons. In 1973 he had his best season, scoring 30 goals and 49 assists for 79 points and being named to play in the All-Star Game. The most famous play of his career came in the 1973 Stanley Cup playoffs when he scored a crucial overtime goal against the Minnesota North Stars on a solo rush. The goal was memorialized on a statue at the Spectrum, which was demolished in 2010-11. The statue now sits outside Stateside Live! in the middle of the South Philadelphia Sports Complex.

Although hampered by injuries throughout his career in consequence of his bruising style, Dornhoefer remained an effective scorer through his penultimate season, and was named to play in the All-Star Game again in 1977, and finished that regular season with a +47 plus/minus mark. The season thereafter, missing nearly half the season through injury, his scoring touch disappeared completely, and he retired after the 1978 playoffs.

Dornhoefer played in 787 games over 14 seasons, scoring 214 goals and 328 assists for 542 points, adding 1291 penalty minutes. At the time of his retirement he was second only to Bobby Clarke as the team's all-time leading scorer, and still ranks tenth in that category. His eleven seasons with Philadelphia are surpassed only by Clarke, Bill Barber and Rick MacLeish, and on a team iconic for its brawling ways, Dornhoefer is eighth in franchise penalty minutes.

== Post-playing career ==
After his retirement following the 1977–1978 season, Dornhoefer moved to broadcasting. He worked a short time in Philadelphia, then moved back to his native Ontario, Canada to work on Hockey Night In Canada as a color commentator from 1978–1987. After a six-year hiatus from broadcasting, Dornhoefer moved back to Philadelphia in 1992 and joined the Flyers broadcast team, originally working with play-by-play man Gene Hart. He served as a Flyers' color analyst through the 2005–06 NHL season. Dornhoefer became a citizen of the United States of America on March 16, 2016.

== Career statistics ==
=== Regular season and playoffs ===
			Regular season					Playoffs
Season	Team	League	GP	G	A	Pts	PIM	GP	G	A	Pts	PIM
1961–62	Niagara Falls Flyers	OHA	50	8	31	39	121	6	2	3	5	15
1962–63	Niagara Falls Flyers	OHA	38	16	34	50	58	16	11	13	24	56
1962–63	Niagara Falls Flyers	MC	—	—	—	—	—	9	2	3	5	33
1963–64	Boston Bruins	NHL	32	12	10	22	20	—	—	—	—	—
1963–64	Minneapolis Bruins	CPHL	39	21	30	51	67	—	—	—	—	—
1964–65	Boston Bruins	NHL	20	0	1	1	13	—	—	—	—	—
1964–65	San Francisco Seals	WHL	37	10	25	35	59	—	—	—	—	—
1965–66	Boston Bruins	NHL	10	0	1	1	2	—	—	—	—	—
1965–66	Hershey Bears	AHL	54	16	20	36	56	3	1	1	2	14
1966–67	Hershey Bears	AHL	71	19	22	41	110	5	0	1	1	7
1967–68	Philadelphia Flyers	NHL	65	13	30	43	134	3	0	0	0	15
1968–69	Philadelphia Flyers	NHL	60	8	16	24	80	4	0	1	1	20
1969–70	Philadelphia Flyers	NHL	65	26	29	55	96	—	—	—	—	—
1970–71	Philadelphia Flyers	NHL	57	20	20	40	93	2	0	0	0	4
1971–72	Philadelphia Flyers	NHL	75	17	32	49	183	—	—	—	—	—
1972–73	Philadelphia Flyers	NHL	77	30	49	79	168	11	3	3	6	16
1973–74	Philadelphia Flyers	NHL	57	11	39	50	125	14	5	6	11	43
1974–75	Philadelphia Flyers	NHL	69	17	27	44	102	17	5	5	10	33
1975–76	Philadelphia Flyers	NHL	74	28	35	63	128	16	3	4	7	43
1976–77	Philadelphia Flyers	NHL	79	25	34	59	85	9	1	0	1	22
1977–78	Philadelphia Flyers	NHL	47	7	5	12	62	4	0	0	0	7
NHL totals			787	214	328	542	1,291	80	17	19	36	203

Preceded by Bill Clement	Philadelphia Flyers TV Color Commentator; 1992–2006	Succeeded by Steve Coates; Keith Jones; Bill Clement
