= Bobby Taylor (ice hockey) =

Canadian ice hockey player

- Born: January 24, 1945 (age 81) Calgary, Alberta, Canada
- Height: 6 ft 1 in (185 cm)
- Weight: 180 lb (82 kg; 12 st 12 lb)
- Position: Goaltender
- Caught: Left
- Played for: Philadelphia Flyers; Pittsburgh Penguins
- Playing career: 1965–1976

Robert Ian "Chief" Taylor (born January 24, 1945) is a Canadian former professional ice hockey goaltender. He played 45 games in the National Hockey League with the Philadelphia Flyers and Pittsburgh Penguins between 1972 and 1976. He was a member of the Philadelphia Flyers teams that won the Stanley Cup in 1974 and 1975.

== Broadcasting career ==
Beginning with the 2015–16 season, Taylor became a studio analyst on the Tampa Bay Lightning pre- and post-game telecasts and between period segments. Until the end of the 2014–15 season, he was the color commentator on Tampa Bay Lightning television broadcasts beginning in 1993, the team's second year of play. Previously, he held the same role for the Philadelphia Flyers alongside legendary hockey announcer Gene Hart, Hall of Fame broadcaster Mike Emrick, and Bob Galerstein from 1976 through 1992 on both television (1977–88) and radio (1988–92). Hart and Taylor called the action in a simulcast of Channel 29/57 and PRISM along with 610 WIP from 1984–88. He was a member of the Philadelphia Flyers teams that won the Stanley Cup in 1974 and 1975.

On December 10, 2014, he announced that he will serve as a studio analyst Tampa Bay Lightning television broadcasts starting with the 2015–16 season, having served as the color commentator on Tampa Bay Lightning television broadcasts beginning in the team's second year of play, and Brian Engblom was hired to replace him in color commentary role. On April 9, 2015, Taylor completed his final regular season broadcast as the color commentator for the Tampa Bay Lightning. Taylor shifted to a teaching role on the pre and post-game shows beginning with the following season. Going into his final 2014-15 game Taylor said: "It's getting a little nostalgic, it's been a long time...I've been in that booth a heck of a long time. I'm excited, yet sad at the same time."

== Career statistics ==
=== Regular season and playoffs ===
			Regular season									Playoffs
Season	Team	League	GP	W	L	T	MIN	GA	SO	GAA	SV%	GP	W	L	MIN	GA	SO	GAA	SV%
1962–63	Calgary Buffaloes	CCJHL	—	—	—	—	—	—	—	—	—	—	—	—	—	—	—	—	—
1963–64	Calgary Buffaloes	CCJHL	—	—	—	—	—	—	—	—	—	—	—	—	—	—	—	—	—
1964–65	St. Catharines Black Hawks	OHA	18	—	—	—	1060	85	0	4.81	—	—	—	—	—	—	—	—	—
1964–65	Edmonton Oil Kings	CAHL	—	—	—	—	—	—	—	—	—	4	1	3	260	16	0	3.69	—
1964–65	Edmonton Oil Kings	M-Cup	—	—	—	—	—	—	—	—	—	3	2	1	180	14	0	4.67	—
1965–66	St. Louis Braves	CHL	—	—	—	—	—	—	—	—	—	—	—	—	—	—	—	—	—
1966–67	Calgary Spurs	AJHL	16	—	—	—	960	40	0	2.50	—	4	—	—	240	15	0	3.75	—
1966–67	Calgary Spurs	Al-Cup	—	—	—	—	—	—	—	—	—	10	6	4	532	29	1	3.27	—
1967–68	Calgary Spurs	WCSHL	27	—	—	—	1620	133	0	5.02	—	3	1	2	140	13	0	5.69	—
1968–69	Jersey Devils	EHL	70	25	38	7	4200	285	1	4.07	—	—	—	—	—	—	—	—	—
1969–70	Seattle Totems	WHL	5	—	—	—	240	14	0	3.50	—	—	—	—	—	—	—	—	—
1969–70	Quebec Aces	AHL	14	—	—	—	759	53	0	4.18	—	2	1	1	123	5	0	2.44	—
1969–70	Jersey Devils	EHL	8	—	—	—	480	55	1	6.88	—	—	—	—	—	—	—	—	—
1970–71	Quebec Aces	AHL	39	13	15	8	2154	122	5	3.39	—	—	—	—	—	—	—	—	—
1971–72	Philadelphia Flyers	NHL	6	1	2	2	320	16	0	3.00	.918	—	—	—	—	—	—	—	—
1971–72	Richmond Robins	AHL	26	7	14	4	1538	78	1	3.04	—	—	—	—	—	—	—	—	—
1972–73	Philadelphia Flyers	NHL	23	8	8	4	1144	78	0	4.09	.888	—	—	—	—	—	—	—	—
1972–73	Richmond Robins	AHL	6	—	—	—	337	23	0	4.09	—	—	—	—	—	—	—	—	—
1973–74	Richmond Robins	AHL	11	4	4	3	659	38	0	3.45	—	—	—	—	—	—	—	—	—
1973–74	Philadelphia Flyers	NHL	8	3	3	0	366	26	0	4.26	.876	—	—	—	—	—	—	—	—
1974–75	Richmond Robins	AHL	5	3	1	1	303	18	0	3.56	—	—	—	—	—	—	—	—	—
1974–75	Philadelphia Flyers	NHL	3	0	2	0	120	13	0	6.50	.812	—	—	—	—	—	—	—	—
1975–76	Philadelphia Flyers	NHL	4	3	1	0	240	15	0	3.75	.880	—	—	—	—	—	—	—	—
1975–76	Richmond Robins	AHL	4	0	2	1	204	18	0	5.29	—	—	—	—	—	—	—	—	—
1975–76	Pittsburgh Penguins	NHL	2	0	1	0	78	7	0	5.38	.854	—	—	—	—	—	—	—	—
1975–76	Springfield Indians	AHL	23	7	14	0	1230	86	0	4.20	—	—	—	—	—	—	—	—	—
NHL totals			46	15	17	6	2268	155	0	4.11	.884	—	—	—	—	—	—	—	—

Preceded by Larry Zeidel	Philadelphia Flyers TV Color Commentator; 1976-1988	Succeeded by Bill Clement
