= Absecon Public School District =

School district in Atlantic County, New Jersey, US

Coordinates: 39.43514°N 74.49506°W

Address
- 800 Irelan Avenue Absecon, Atlantic County, New Jersey, 08201; United States

District information
- Grades: PreK-8
- Superintendent: Daniel J. Dooley
- Business administrator: Julie Velluzzi
- Schools: 2

Students and staff
- Enrollment: 921 (as of 2024–25)
- Faculty: 97.5 FTEs
- Student–teacher ratio: 9.5:1

Other information
- District Factor Group: CD
- Website: www.abseconschools.org
| Ind. | Per pupil | District spending | Rank (*) | PK-8 average | %± vs. average |
|---|---|---|---|---|---|
| 1A | Total Spending | $14,297 | 6 | $18,891 | −24.3% |
| 1 | Budgetary Cost | 11,259 | 9 | 14,159 | −20.5% |
| 2 | Classroom Instruction | 7,520 | 13 | 8,659 | −13.2% |
| 6 | Support Services | 1,331 | 6 | 2,167 | −38.6% |
| 8 | Administrative Cost | 1,250 | 11 | 1,547 | −19.2% |
| 10 | Operations & Maintenance | 1,097 | 6 | 1,612 | −31.9% |
| 13 | Extracurricular Activities | 52 | 11 | 104 | −50.0% |
| 16 | Median Teacher Salary | 68,330 | 74 | 61,136 |
Data from NJDoE 2014 Taxpayers' Guide to Education Spending. *Of PK-8 districts with more than 750 students. Lowest spending=1; Highest=84

The Absecon Public School District is a comprehensive community public school district that serves students in pre-kindergarten through eighth grade from Absecon, in Atlantic County, in the U.S. state of New Jersey.

As of the 2024–25 school year, the district, comprised of two schools, had an enrollment of 921 students and 97.5 classroom teachers (on an FTE basis), for a student–teacher ratio of 9.5:1.

For ninth through twelfth grades, public school students from Absecon attend the Pleasantville High School in Pleasantville as part of a sending/receiving relationship with the Pleasantville Public Schools. As of the 2024–25 school year, the high school had an enrollment of 997 students and 74.0 classroom teachers (on an FTE basis), for a student–teacher ratio of 13.5:1. Students are also eligible to attend the Atlantic County Institute of Technology and Charter-Tech High School for the Performing Arts.

== History ==
A 2019 study looked at the possibility of dissolving the sending relationship with Pleasantville. The consultants considered a shift to either Mainland Regional High School or the Greater Egg Harbor Regional High School District (at either Absegami High School or Cedar Creek High School). The study concluded that Absegami High School was the preferred alternative and that the district would achieve significant savings from lower costs per student. In 2020, Absecon district submitted a petition to end its agreement with Pleasantville and send its students to Absegami High School under a new sending/receiving relationship with the Greater Egg Harbor Regional High School District that Absecon argues would give its students a better education at a lower cost, without negatively impacting the demographics in Pleasantville High School. About 10% of Absecon's graduating students have been choosing to attend Pleasantville High School, for which the Absecon district has been paying $18,000 per student each year. In May 2022, the Acting State Commissioner of the New Jersey Department of Education rejected the petition, citing the impact that the departure of Absecon's students would have on the racial balance at Pleasantville High School.

The district had been classified by the New Jersey Department of Education as being in District Factor Group "CD", the sixth-highest of eight groupings. District Factor Groups organize districts statewide to allow comparison by common socioeconomic characteristics of the local districts. From lowest socioeconomic status to highest, the categories are A, B, CD, DE, FG, GH, I and J.

== Schools ==
Schools in the district (with 2024–25 enrollment data from the National Center for Education Statistics.) are:

Elementary school

- H. Ashton Marsh Elementary School with 516 students in grades PreK–4
  - Leslie Schiavo, principal

Middle school

- Emma C. Attales Middle School with 392 students in grades 5–8
  - Kevin Burns, principal

== Administration ==
Core members of the district's administration are:

- Daniel J. Dooley, superintendent of schools
- Julie Velluzzi, business administrator and board secretary

== Board of education ==
The district's board of education is comprised of seven members who set policy and oversee the fiscal and educational operation of the district through its administration. As a Type II school district, the board's trustees are elected directly by voters to serve three-year terms of office on a staggered basis, with either two or three seats up for election each year held (since 2012) as part of the November general election. The board appoints a superintendent to oversee the district's day-to-day operations and a business administrator to supervise the business functions of the district.
