= Tim Saunders (sportscaster) =

American sportscaster (born 1962)

Tim Saunders (born December 19, 1962) is a Philadelphia-based broadcaster. He is the radio announcer for the Philadelphia Flyers.

== Career ==
Saunders has called games for the Flyers since 1997 replacing John Wiedeman. He is also the former voice of the Camden Riversharks baseball team. He previously worked with Steve Coates as his color commentator until Coates retired following the end of the Flyers 2022–23 season. Baseball was one of Tim's favorite sports while as a kid. In addition to the Flyers and Riversharks, Saunders was the director of broadcasting and play-by-play voice of the International Hockey League's Cleveland Lumberjacks. His other jobs included games for the Tulsa Oilers for the Central Hockey League and the Muskegon Fury and is originally from Grosse Pointe, Michigan.

Saunders has been a resident of Somerdale, New Jersey.
