= Steve Coates =

Canadian ice hockey player

- Born: July 27, 1950 (age 74); Toronto, Ontario, Canada
- Height: 5 ft 9 in (175 cm)
- Weight: 172 lb (78 kg; 12 st 4 lb)
- Position: Right wing
- Shot: Right
- Played for: Detroit Red Wings
- NHL draft: Undrafted
- Playing career: 1973–1980

Stephen John Coates (born July 27, 1950) is a Canadian retired professional ice hockey player. He is currently the radio color commentator for the Philadelphia Flyers on 97.5 The Fanatic, after spending 14 seasons with the Flyers television team.

Coates played five games in the National Hockey League with the Detroit Red Wings during the 1976–77 season. The rest of his career, which lasted from 1973 to 1980, was spent in the minor leagues.

== Playing career ==
Coates' professional hockey career began when he signed with the Philadelphia Flyers in 1973 as a free agent after four seasons with the Michigan Tech Huskies. After playing in four seasons in the Flyers' minor league system, he was dealt to the Detroit Red Wings along with Terry Murray, Bob Ritchie, and Dave Kelly in exchange for Rick Lapointe and Mike Korney during the 1976–77 season. In five games for the Red Wings that season, he scored one goal for his only NHL point. He spent the next three years playing in the Central Hockey League (CHL) and the American Hockey League (AHL) before retiring.

== Broadcasting career ==
Coates started his broadcasting career with the Flyers in 1980 as a radio color commentator, and switched over to television in 1999. He spent the next 14 seasons on television as a color commentator and between-the-benches reporter for the Flyers before moving back to radio at the start of the 2014–15 season.

=== "Coatesy's Corner" ===
From 1999 to 2011, Coates was the host of a short segment that aired during the first intermission of local Flyers television broadcasts, filmed prior to the game. These segments included interviews, explanations of NHL rules, analysis of current NHL events, and sometimes skits with Flyers players for comedic purposes. During the 2010–11 season, Coatesy's Corner began to air less and less and was eventually officially retired by the end of the season.

== Personal life ==
Coates currently resides in Egg Harbor Township, New Jersey.

== Career statistics ==
=== Regular season and playoffs ===
			Regular season					Playoffs
Season	Team	League	GP	G	A	Pts	PIM	GP	G	A	Pts	PIM
1966–67	Markham Waxers	MetJBHL	—	—	—	—	—	—	—	—	—	—
1967–68	Markham Waxers	MetJBHL	—	—	—	—	—	—	—	—	—	—
1968–69	Markham Waxers	MetJBHL	—	—	—	—	—	—	—	—	—	—
1969–70	Michigan Tech	WCHA	3	0	0	0	4	—	—	—	—	—
1970–71	Michigan Tech	WCHA	33	7	9	16	46	—	—	—	—	—
1971–72	Michigan Tech	WCHA	30	7	9	16	36	—	—	—	—	—
1972–73	Michigan Tech	WCHA	34	11	11	22	28	—	—	—	—	—
1972–73	Calumet-Houghton Chiefs	USHL	4	5	6	11	7	—	—	—	—	—
1973–74	Des Moines Capitols	IHL	72	31	39	70	167	10	6	3	9	35
1974–75	Richmond Robins	AHL	50	7	7	14	168	7	3	0	3	7
1975–76	Richmond Robins	AHL	69	25	19	44	141	—	—	—	—	—
1976–77	Springfield Indians	AHL	57	17	23	40	122	—	—	—	—	—
1976–77	Detroit Red Wings	NHL	5	1	0	1	24	—	—	—	—	—
1977–78	Kansas City Red Wings	CHL	63	14	20	34	83	—	—	—	—	—
1977–78	Maine Mariners	AHL	15	3	2	5	11	6	0	2	2	8
1978–79	Philadelphia Firebirds	AHL	74	15	25	40	107	—	—	—	—	—
1979–80	Syracuse Firebirds	AHL	67	10	23	33	95	—	—	—	—	—
AHL totals			332	77	99	176	644	13	3	2	5	15
NHL totals			5	1	0	1	24	—	—	—	—	—

Preceded by Bobby Taylor; Chris Therien	Philadelphia Flyers Radio Color Commentator; 1980–99, 2014–Present	Succeeded by Brian Propp; Incumbent
Preceded by Gary Dornhoefer	Philadelphia Flyers TV Color Commentator; 1999–2014	Succeeded by Chris Therien
