= Pleasantville High School (New Jersey) =

Public school in New Jersey, United States

Location
- 701 Mill Road; Pleasantville, Atlantic County, New Jersey 08232; United States; 39.405171°N 74.526525°W

Information
- Type: Public high school
- School district: Pleasantville Public Schools
- NCES School ID: 341320000192
- Principal: Kelli Best
- Faculty: 74.0 FTEs
- Grades: 9-12
- Enrollment: 997 (as of 2024–25)
- Student to teacher ratio: 13.5:1
- Colors: Maroon and white
- Athletics conference: Cape-Atlantic League (general); West Jersey Football League (football)
- Team name: Greyhounds
- Rival: Atlantic City High School
- Website: www.pps-nj.us/pps/Schools/High%20School

Pleasantville High School is a comprehensive community public high school that serves students in ninth through twelfth grade from the City of Pleasantville, in Atlantic County, in the U.S. state of New Jersey, operating as the lone secondary school of the Pleasantville Public Schools, an Abbott District.

Students from Absecon attend the district's high school for grades 9-12 as part of a sending/receiving relationship with the Absecon Public School District.

As of the 2024–25 school year, the school had an enrollment of 997 students and 74.0 classroom teachers (on an FTE basis), for a student–teacher ratio of 13.5:1. There were 661 students (66.3% of enrollment) eligible for free lunch and 63 (6.3% of students) eligible for reduced-cost lunch.

== Awards, recognition and rankings ==
In 2004, the Try-Math-A-Lon Team won the National Championship at the National Society of Black Engineers Conference (NSBE) in Dallas, Texas. In 2010 and 2011, the Try-Math-A-Lon teams won the regional championships and progressed to the Nationals in Boston and Orlando respectively where they placed second both years.

The school was the 311th-ranked public high school in New Jersey out of 339 schools statewide in New Jersey Monthly magazine's September 2014 cover story on the state's "Top Public High Schools", using a new ranking methodology. The school had been ranked 267th in the state of 328 schools in 2012, after being ranked 299th in 2010 out of 322 schools listed. The magazine ranked the school 309th in 2008 out of 316 schools. The school was ranked 281st in the magazine's September 2006 issue, which surveyed 316 schools across the state. Schooldigger.com ranked the school as 363rd out of 376 public high schools statewide in its 2010 rankings (a decrease of 6 positions from the 2009 rank) which were based on the combined percentage of students classified as proficient or above proficient on the language arts literacy and mathematics components of the High School Proficiency Assessment (HSPA).

== Athletics ==
The Pleasantville High School Greyhounds compete in the National Division of the Cape-Atlantic League, an athletic conference comprised of both public and private high schools located in Atlantic, Cape May, Cumberland, and Gloucester County, New Jersey counties, and operating under the aegis of the New Jersey State Interscholastic Athletic Association (NJSIAA). With 668 students in grades 10-12, the school was classified by the NJSIAA for the 2022–24 school years as Group II South for most athletic competition purposes. The football team competes in the Patriot Division of the 94-team West Jersey Football League superconference and was classified by the NJSIAA as Group III South for football for 2024–2026, which included schools with 695 to 882 students.

Interscholastic sports offered at Pleasantville High School include:

- Fall sports: Football (M), Cross Country, Soccer, Volleyball, Tennis and Cheerleading
- Winter sports: Indoor Track, Basketball, Swim (Co-ed) and Cheerleading
- Spring sports: Baseball, Softball, Tennis, and Track & Field.

All sports compete at the Varsity and Junior Varsity level. Some sports may offer a freshman team.

The school has had a longstanding sports rivalry with Atlantic City High School. The best known is between the basketball teams of both schools, an event that is referred to as "Battle By The Bay" which started in 1994. Atlantic City High won 13 games and Pleasantville has won 6. The cheerleading battle between both schools is considered to be one of the highlights of the event.

The boys' basketball team won the Group II title in 1974 (defeating runner-up Hillside High School in the tournament final), 1995 (vs. Boonton High School) and 1996 (vs. Dwight Morrow High School).

The girls' basketball team won the Group II state championships in 1978 (against Lyndhurst High School in the finals) and 1981 (vs. Queen of Peace High School). The 1978 team finished the season with a 24-3 record after winning the Group III title with a 49-42 win against Lyndhurst in the championship game. The 1981 team won the Group II title after they defeated Queen of Peace by a score of 60-45 in the championship game played at North Brunswick Township High School with 1,500 in attendance.

The girls' outdoor track and field team won the Group II state championship in 1995.

The boys track team won the indoor track Group I state championship in 1996, 2008, 2012 and 2013, and won the Group II title in 1999 (as co-champion). The girls team won the Group II title in 2011.

The boys track team won the Group II spring / outdoor track state championship in 1996, 1999 and 2018.

The boys' track team won the NJSIAA indoor relay championships in Group II in 1999 and in Group I in both 2012 and 2013.

In 2011, Pleasantville's track and field won two state titles at the Group I indoor track and field championships at the Bennett Center in Toms River.

In 2022, the female volleyball team won the state title for the NJSIAA South Jersey, Group 2 Tournament. This team became the first female volleyball team in all of Atlantic County to win a sectional state championship.

== Shooting ==
Six suspects were arrested after a shooting broke out during the third quarter of a November 2019 football playoff game in Pleasantville against Camden High School, with Camden leading by a score of 6-0. A 10-year-old victim, one of four injured spectators, died days later. 31-year-old Alvin Wyatt, the suspected shooter pled not guilty to his charges which included murder, attempted murder, and weapons offenses. In July 2023, Wyatt was found guilty of his charges and he was sentenced to 70 years in prison the following September.

== Administration ==
The school's principal is Kelli Best. Core members of the school's administration are the two assistant principals.

== Notable alumni ==
- Nia Ali (born 1988, class of 2006), track and field athlete, who specializes in the 100 m hurdles, heptathlon and other events
- Tim Dale (born 1957), former sprinter
- Dino Hall (born 1955), former running back for the Cleveland Browns of the National Football League who became a physical education teacher at the school
- Gene Hart (1931–1999), sports announcer for the Philadelphia Flyers of the National Hockey League and the Philadelphia Phantoms of the American Hockey League
- Ralph Peterson Jr. (born 1962, class of 1980), jazz drummer and bandleader
- Monique Samuels, television personality best known as a cast member of the reality television series The Real Housewives of Potomac
- Dave Vonner (born 1972), toy designer
