= Atlantic City and Shore Railroad =

Shore Fast Line
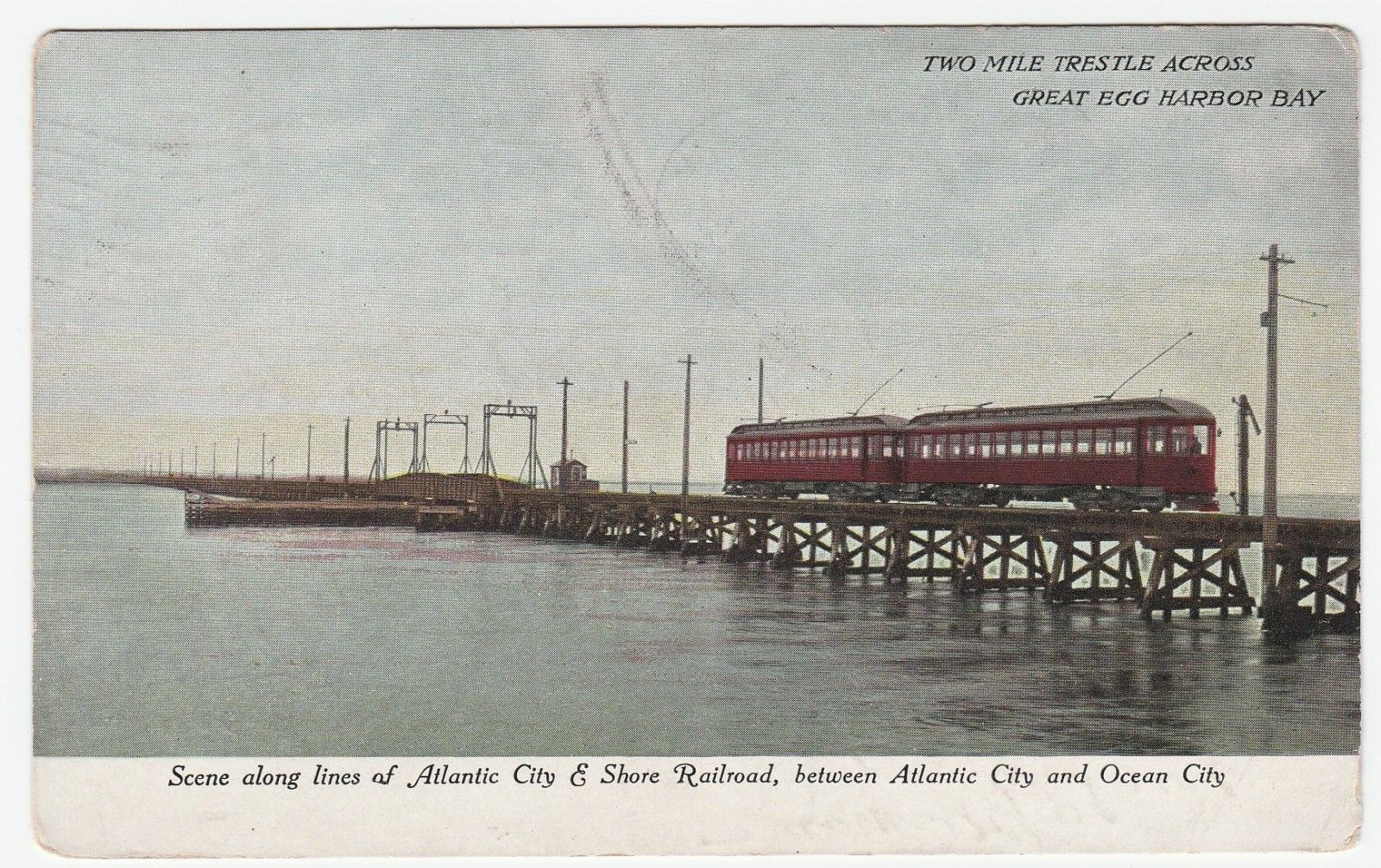
- Two Mile Trestle across Great Egg Harbor Bay in an early 20th century postcard

Overview
- Locale: New Jersey
- Termini: Atlantic City, U.S.; Ocean City, U.S.

Service
- Operator(s): Atlantic City and Shore Railroad

History
- Opened: 1907
- Closed: 1948

Technical
- Track gauge: 1,435 mm (4 ft 8 1/2 in)

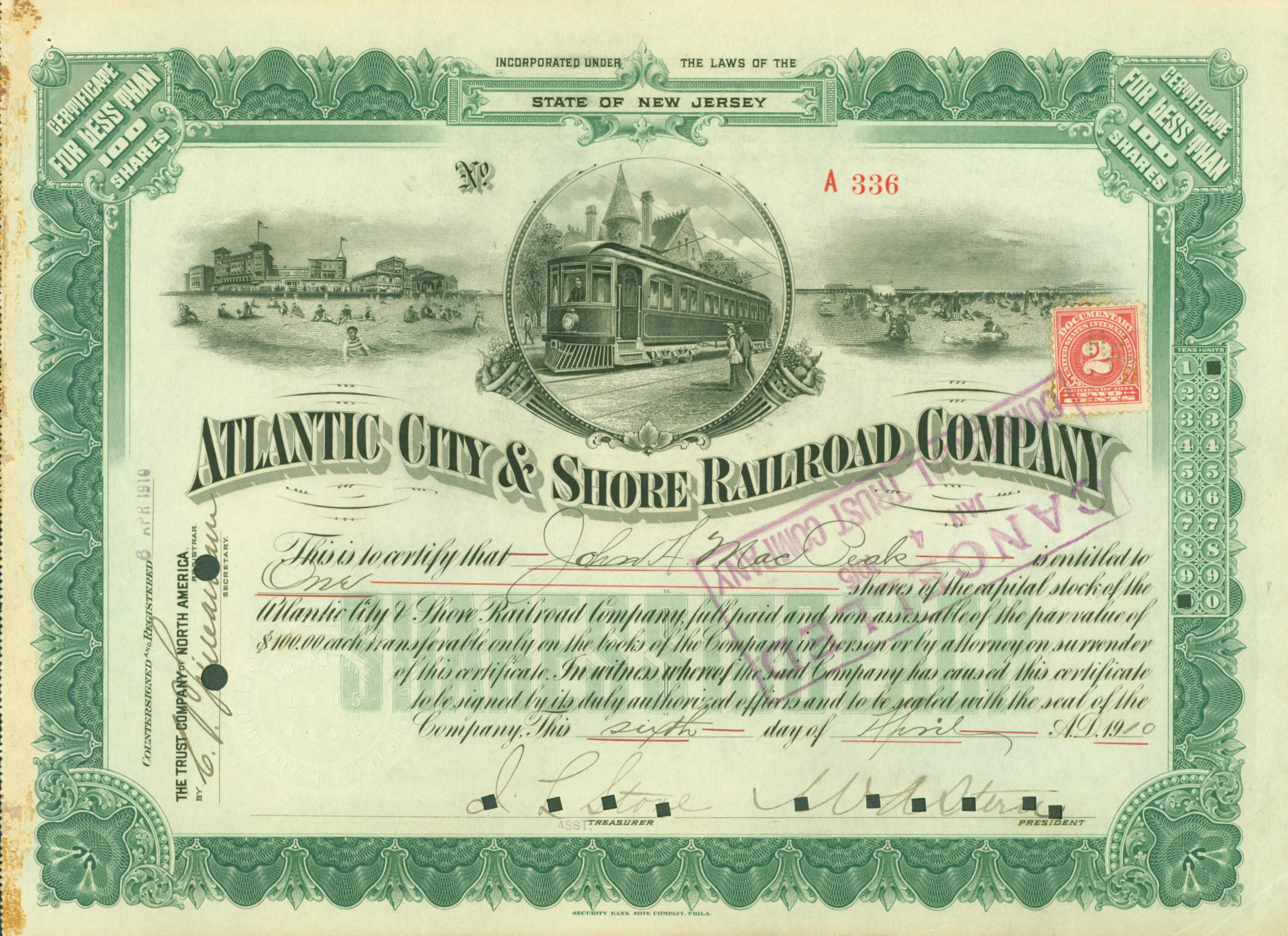
Share of the Atlantic City & Shore Railroad Company, issued 6 April 1910

The Shore Fast Line was an electric interurban railroad running from Atlantic City, New Jersey, to Ocean City, New Jersey, by way of the mainland communities of Pleasantville, Northfield, Linwood and Somers Point. The line of about 11 miles (18 km) ran from 1907 until 1948, when a hurricane damaged the viaduct and the decline of trolleys meant that the cost to replace it was prohibitive. The company that operated the Shore Fast Line was called Atlantic City and Shore Railroad.

The Atlantic City Quakers who helped develop the Monopoly board game named one of the railroad squares for the Shore Fast Line. Charles and Olive Todd, who taught the game to Charles Darrow, its eventual patentee, shortened the name on their oilcloth board to Short Line. It is also possible that the existence of short-line railroads, those that operate along short distances, influenced that change.

Portions of the Right-of-way running for 6 miles (9.7 km) between Pleasantville and Somers Point have been repurposed as the Somers Point Bike Path

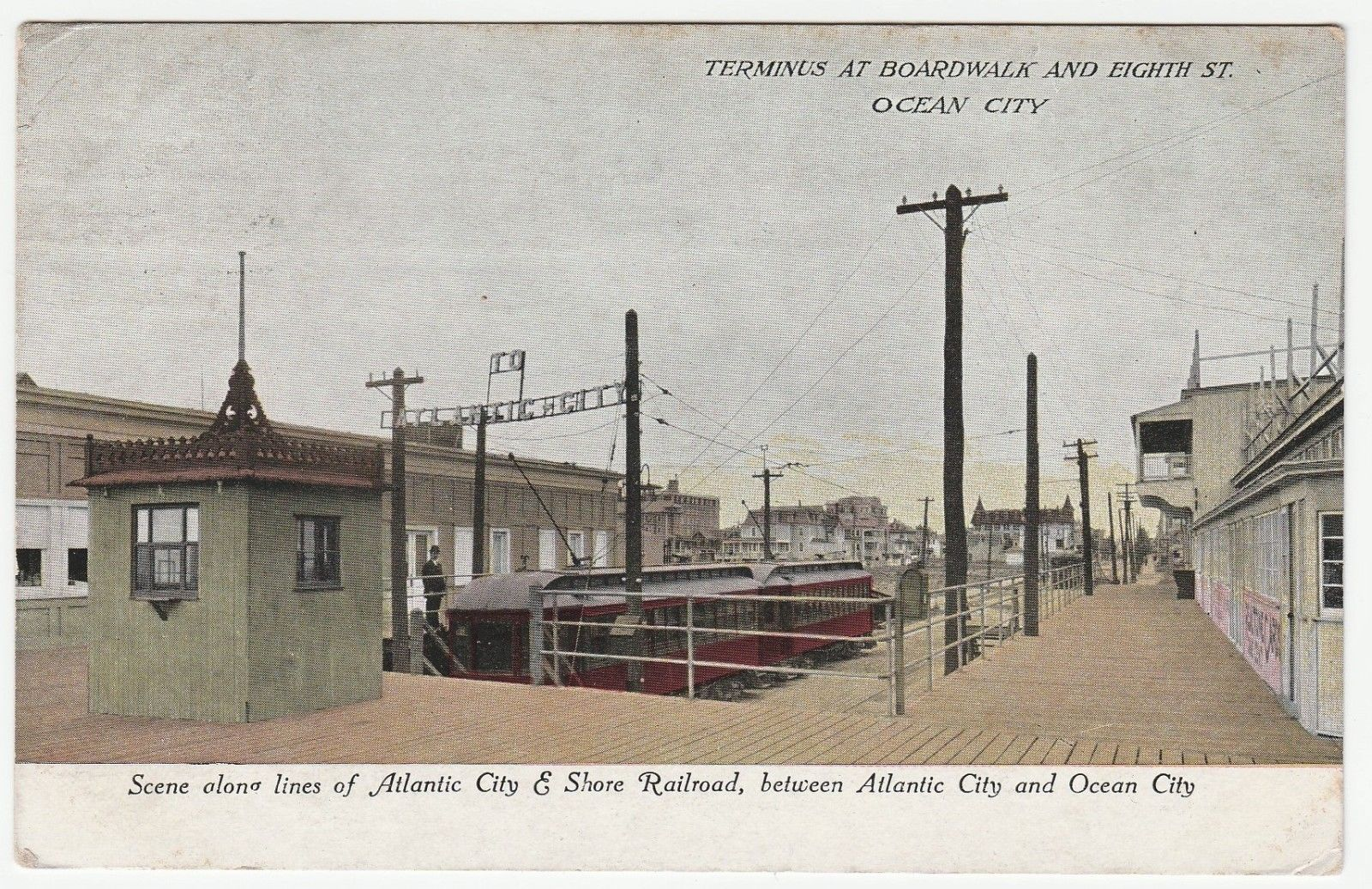
Terminus at Boardwalk and Eight Street, Ocean City

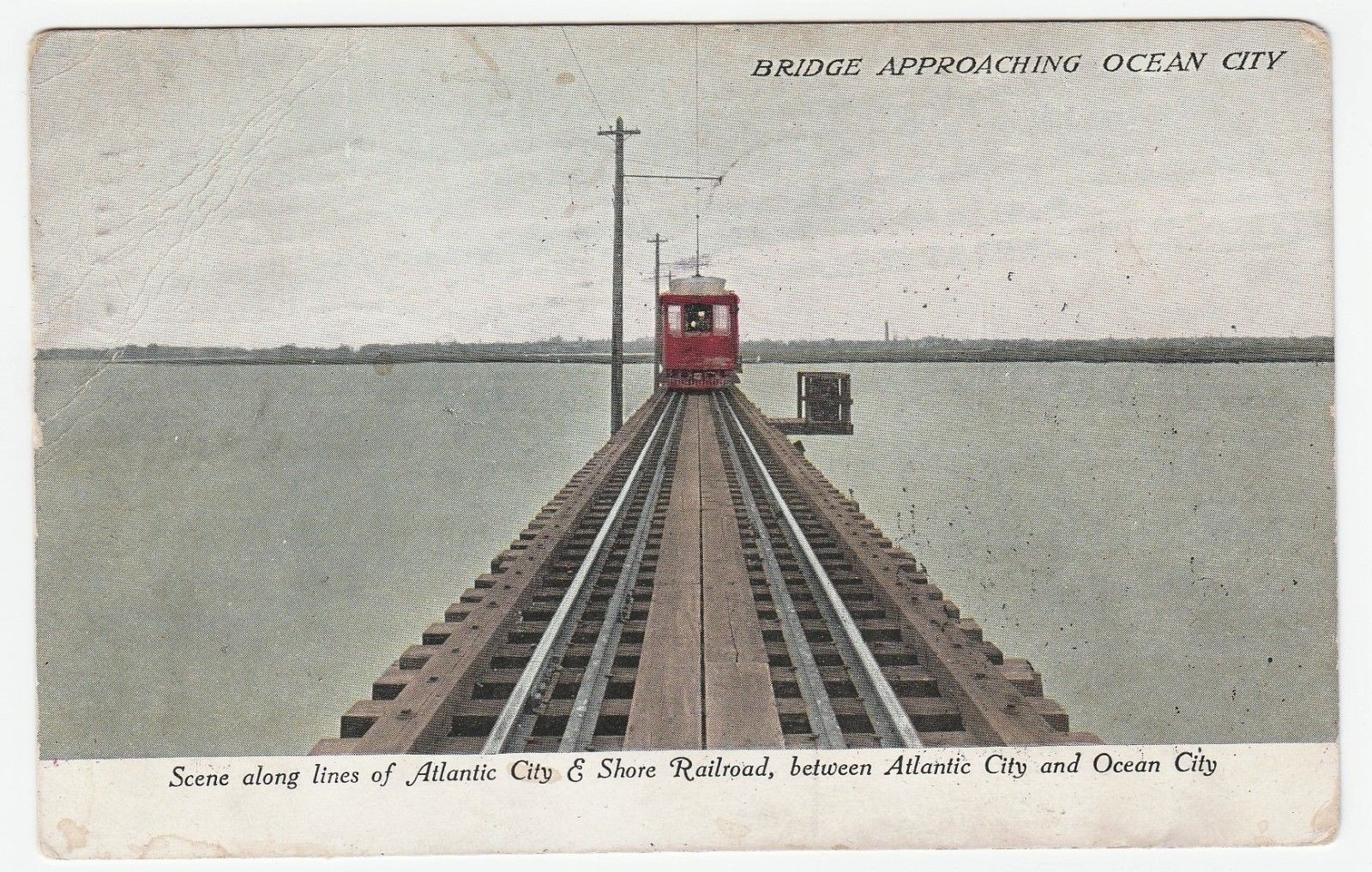
Bridge Approaching Ocean City

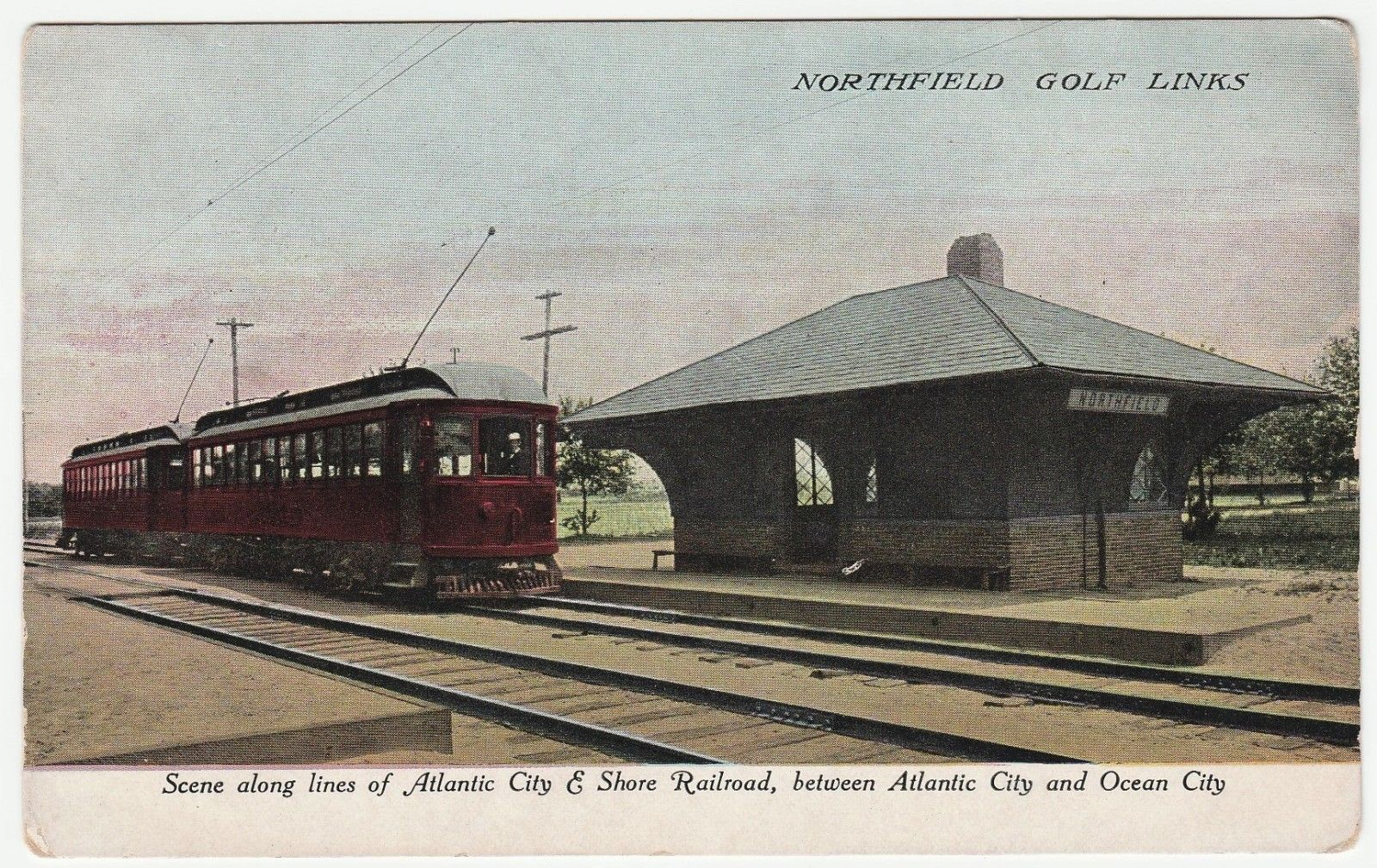
Northfield Golf Links

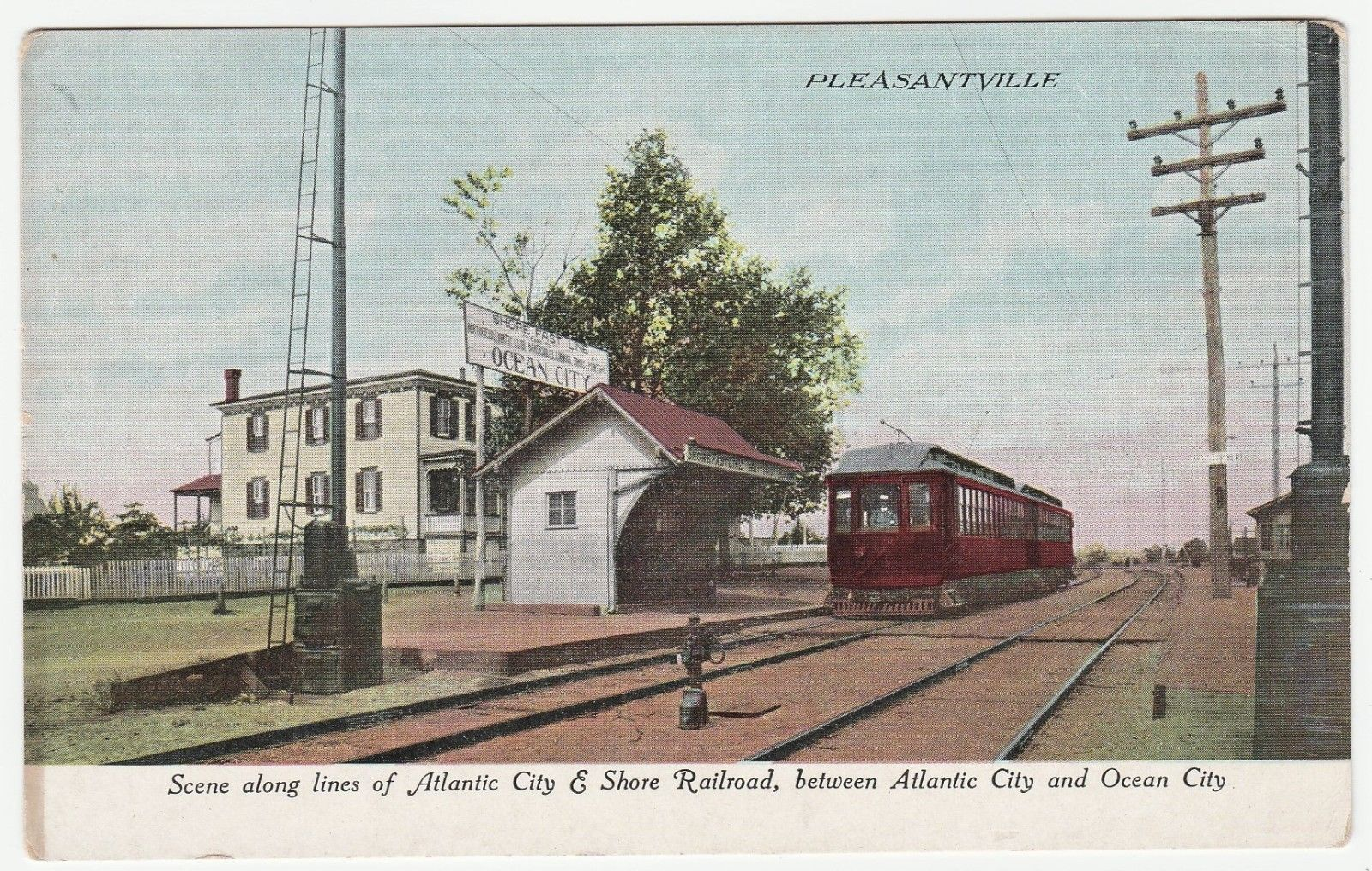
Pleasantville

== See also ==
- List of New Jersey street railroads
- Pennsylvania Railroad
- Pennsylvania-Reading Seashore Lines
- West Jersey and Seashore Railroad
