= Dave Vonner =

American toy designer

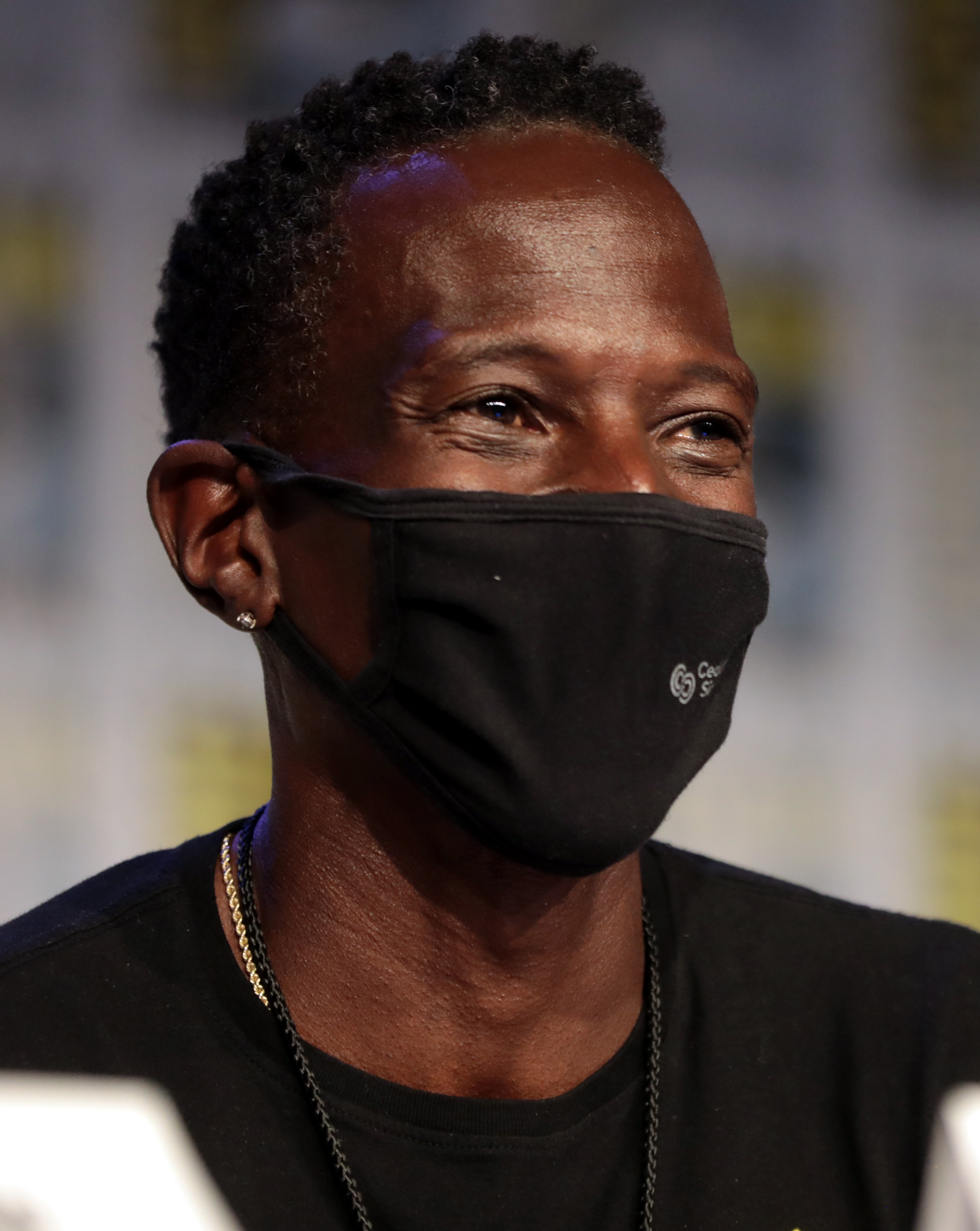
Vonner at the 2021 San Diego Comic-Con.

Dave Vonner (born David A. Vonner II, September 17, 1972) is an American toy designer.

== Early life and education ==
Vonner grew up in Atlantic City, New Jersey, and was a comic book collector. A native of Pleasantville, New Jersey, Vonner graduated from Pleasantville High School and attended the Art Institute of Philadelphia.

== Career in the toy industry ==
Vonner worked for Toy Biz, Inc., and worked with other Toy Biz team members, including Jesse Falcon, to create Marvel Legends. The Legends figure War Machine bears Vonner's likeness, as does the 3 3/4" War Machine in the Iron Man 2 Comic Book series.

Vonner later joined the Hasbro (Marvel Design Team), in which he oversaw the design and development of licensed Marvel toys and action figures based on movies, cartoons and comic books. Along with such movie lines as Iron Man, Iron Man 2, Thor, and more, Vonner also managed the overall design & development of the Marvel Universe 3 3/4" action figure line, offering a wide variety of characters from Marvel's classic comic catalog.

In March 2012, Vonner and co-founder Scott George (also formally of Hasbro) started Kasual Friday, which focuses on pop culture product based on several Classic cinematic licenses. Kasual Friday made its debut during the 2012 Wizard World Philadelphia Comic Con.
