= Pleasantville Public Schools =

School district in New Jersey, United States

Address
- 801 Mill Road Pleasantville, Atlantic County, New Jersey, 08232; United States
- Coordinates: 39.413626°N 74.523349°W

District information
- Grades: PreK-12
- Superintendent: Felicia Hyman-Medley (Acting)
- Business administrator: Daile Dixon-White
- Schools: 6
- Affiliation: Former Abbott district

Students and staff
- Enrollment: 3,743 (as of 2021–22)
- Faculty: 316.4 FTEs
- Student–teacher ratio: 11.8:1

Other information
- District Factor Group: A
- Website: www.pps-nj.us/pps/
Ind.	Per pupil	District spending	Rank (*)	K-12 average	%± vs. average
1A	Total Spending	$20,526	81	$18,891	8.7%
1	Budgetary Cost	17,828	98	14,783	20.6%
2	Classroom Instruction	10,399	95	8,763	18.7%
6	Support Services	2,728	82	2,392	14.0%
8	Administrative Cost	1,834	98	1,485	23.5%
10	Operations & Maintenance	2,383	91	1,783	33.7%
13	Extracurricular Activities	284	66	268	6.0%
16	Median Teacher Salary	56,001	8	64,043
Data from NJDoE 2014 Taxpayers' Guide to Education Spending. *Of K-12 districts with more than 3,500 students. Lowest spending=1; Highest=103

The Pleasantville Public Schools are a comprehensive community public school district that serves students in pre-kindergarten through twelfth grade from the City of Pleasantville, in Atlantic County, in the U.S. state of New Jersey. The district is one of 31 former Abbott districts statewide that were established pursuant to the decision by the New Jersey Supreme Court in Abbott v. Burke which are now referred to as "SDA Districts" based on the requirement for the state to cover all costs for school building and renovation projects in these districts under the supervision of the New Jersey Schools Development Authority.

As of the 2021–22 school year, the district, comprising six schools, had an enrollment of 3,743 students and 316.4 classroom teachers (on an FTE basis), for a student–teacher ratio of 11.8:1.

Students from Absecon attend the district's high school for ninth through twelfth grades as part of a sending/receiving relationship with the Absecon Public School District. Absecon has sought to end its agreement with Pleasantville and send its students to Absegami High School under a new sending/receiving relationship with the Greater Egg Harbor Regional High School District that Absecon argues would give its students a better education at a lower cost, without negatively impacting the demographics in Pleasantville High School. About 10% of Absecon's graduating students have been choosing to attend Pleasantville High School, for which the Absecon district has been paying $18,000 per student each year.

== History ==
In 1948, during de jure educational segregation in the United States, the district had a school for black children.

In September 2007, The FBI arrested five members of the Pleasantville school board as part of a federal corruption case that included several state lawmakers and other public officials. Included in the sweep were the arrests of Assemblymen Mims Hackett and Alfred E. Steele, and Passaic Mayor Samuel Rivera. Indictments were filed against four sitting members of the board of education charging that they had accepted bribes to steer insurance or roofing business from the district. Charged were Jayson Adams (accused of accepting $15,000 in bribes), James McCormick ($3,500), James Pressley ($32,200) and Rafael Velez ($14,000). Former board member Maurice 'Pete' Callaway, a current Pleasantville councilmember, was accused of accepting $13,000 in bribes as part of the scheme and was sentenced to 12 months in federal prison for his role as bagman in the scheme.

The dissolution of some charter schools was a factor in an increase in the student population around 2014, despite a decline in casino jobs.

The district had been classified by the New Jersey Department of Education as being in District Factor Group "A", the lowest of eight groupings. District Factor Groups organize districts statewide to allow comparison by common socioeconomic characteristics of the local districts. From lowest socioeconomic status to highest, the categories are A, B, CD, DE, FG, GH, I and J.

== Awards and recognition ==
For the 2005-06 school year, Washington Avenue Elementary School was one of 22 schools statewide selected as Governor's School of Excellence Winners, an award given to schools that demonstrated significant improvement over the previous two academic years.

In March 2007, the commissioner of the New Jersey Department of Education appointed a monitor to supervise and address a series of issues raised regarding the district's financial practices and "to ensure that state school aid is spent efficiently and effectively".

== Schools ==
Schools in the district (with 2021–22 enrollment data from the National Center for Education Statistics) are:

Early childhood

- Decatur Avenue Early Childhood Center with N/A students in grade PreK
  - Howard Johnson, principal

Elementary schools

- Leeds Avenue School with 567 students in grades PreK-5
  - Velecia Bush, principal
- North Main Street School with 308 students in grades PreK-5
  - Felicia Hyman-Medley, principal
- South Main Street School with 478 students in grades PreK-5
  - Rayna K. Hendricks, principal
- Washington Avenue School with 407 students in grades K-5
  - Cynthia Ruiz-Cooper, principal

Secondary schools

- Pleasantville Middle School with 847 students in grades 6-8
  - Ramon Santiago Jr, principal
- Pleasantville High School with 893 students in grades 9-12
  - Thomas McCann

== Administration ==
Core members of the district's administration are:

- Marilyn Martinez, superintendent of schools
- Daile Dixon-White, business administrator and board secretary

== Board of education ==
The district's board of education, comprised of nine members, sets policy and oversees the fiscal and educational operation of the district through its administration. As a Type II school district, the board's trustees are elected directly by voters to serve three-year terms of office on a staggered basis, with three seats up for election each year held (since 2012) as part of the November general election. The board appoints a superintendent to oversee the district's day-to-day operations and a business administrator to supervise the business functions of the district.
