= Larry Zeidel =

Canadian ice hockey player

- Born: June 1, 1928 Montreal, Quebec, Canada
- Died: June 17, 2014 (aged 86) Philadelphia, Pennsylvania, U.S.
- Height: 5 ft 11 in (180 cm)
- Weight: 185 lb (84 kg; 13 st 3 lb)
- Position: Defence
- Shot: Left
- Played for: Detroit Red Wings; Chicago Black Hawks; Philadelphia Flyers
- Playing career: 1947–1968

Lazarus "Larry The Rock" Zeidel (June 1, 1928 – June 17, 2014) was a Canadian professional ice hockey defenceman, most notably for the Hershey Bears of the American Hockey League, for whom he played nine seasons, and in the National Hockey League for the Chicago Black Hawks and the Philadelphia Flyers during a career that lasted from 1947 to 1969. He is considered one of the most violent players in hockey history, and at the time of his retirement, was the most penalized player in minor league history.

== Biography ==
Zeidel was Jewish, and was born in Montreal, Quebec, Canada. His Romanian grandparents "had been cremated in a concentration camp".

Zeidel played for the Detroit Red Wings and Chicago Black Hawks in the early 1950s, and concluded his career with the Philadelphia Flyers in the late 1960s. In between, he played for numerous teams in the Western Hockey League and the American Hockey League. Zeidel played most of his career for the Hershey Bears, a team later affiliated with the National Hockey League’s Washington Capitals but that was independent at the time, located in Hershey, Pennsylvania. In 1959–60, his 293 penalty minutes set an AHL league record.

Zeidel won the Stanley Cup in 1952 with the Detroit Red Wings. He won the Calder Cup in 1964 with the Cleveland Barons.

Zeidel promoted himself to all 1967 expansion franchises using a self-made promotion kit and resume, subsequently drawing the interest of the Philadelphia Flyers, who signed him to a contract at age 39. While playing for the Philadelphia Flyers, he was involved in a violent stick-swinging duel with Boston's Eddie Shack, which left both men bleeding. Both players were suspended for the incident, Zeidel receiving a four-game suspension and three games for Shack. Boston Bruins players yelled at him with anti-Semitic comments throughout the season after the incident.

After he retired from hockey, Zeidel worked as a marketing consultant for an investment house.

Zeidel died on June 17, 2014, at 86 years of age of complications from congestive heart failure, kidney problems, and dementia. He was diagnosed after death by Boston University researchers who were studying brains of deceased hockey players. A panel of neurologists, neuropsychologists, and researchers reached the clinical consensus diagnoses that he suffered from chronic traumatic encephalopathy, a neurodegenerative disease found in people who have had multiple head injuries. The report concluded that he had likely had more than 100 concussions, and lost consciousness over 10 times. By the time he had retired, he had suffered debilitating headaches, acute temper, odd behavior, and had made uncharacteristically rash financial decisions.

== Career statistics ==
=== Regular season and playoffs ===
			Regular season					Playoffs
Season	Team	League	GP	G	A	Pts	PIM	GP	G	A	Pts	PIM
1944–45	Porcupine Combines	NOJHA	—	2	1	3	2	—	—	—	—	—
1944–45	Porcupine Combines	M-Cup	—	—	—	—	—	2	0	0	0	0
1945–46	Verdun Maple Leafs	QJHL	17	2	7	9	34	3	1	1	2	2
1946–47	Barrie Flyers	OHA	28	7	13	20	48	5	2	0	2	0
1947–48	Quebec Aces	QSHL	48	7	20	27	82	10	1	3	4	13
1948–49	Quebec Aces	QSHL	52	4	18	22	92	—	—	—	—	—
1949–50	Quebec Aces	QSHL	55	7	19	26	176	13	1	4	5	49
1950–51	Saskatoon Quakers	WCSHL	58	5	27	32	169	8	2	2	4	18
1951–52	Detroit Red Wings	NHL	19	1	0	1	14	5	0	0	0	0
1951–52	Indianapolis Capitals	AHL	43	6	17	23	99	—	—	—	—	—
1952–53	Edmonton Flyers	WHL	59	4	22	26	114	15	2	6	8	26
1952–53	Detroit Red Wings	NHL	9	0	0	0	8	—	—	—	—	—
1953–54	Chicago Black Hawks	NHL	64	1	6	7	102	—	—	—	—	—
1954–55	Edmonton Flyers	WHL	70	10	40	50	142	9	2	5	7	2
1955–56	Hershey Bears	AHL	56	5	27	32	128	—	—	—	—	—
1956–57	Hershey Bears	AHL	64	9	19	28	211	7	0	5	5	21
1957–58	Hershey Bears	AHL	58	2	16	18	152	11	0	6	6	20
1958–59	Hershey Bears	AHL	67	8	24	32	129	13	4	6	10	59
1959–60	Hershey Bears	AHL	66	5	19	24	293	—	—	—	—	—
1960–61	Hershey Bears	AHL	70	4	25	29	149	8	0	2	2	8
1961–62	Hershey Bears	AHL	70	3	19	22	146	7	0	1	1	20
1962–63	Hershey Bears	AHL	66	4	29	33	127	14	1	6	7	51
1963–64	Seattle Totems	WHL	66	5	19	24	163	—	—	—	—	—
1963–64	Cleveland Barons	AHL	2	0	1	1	2	9	0	4	4	12
1964–65	Seattle Totems	WHL	64	2	12	14	202	7	1	2	3	2
1965–66	Cleveland Barons	AHL	72	3	12	15	162	12	1	3	4	14
1966–67	Cleveland Barons	AHL	72	5	24	29	124	—	—	—	—	—
1967–68	Philadelphia Flyers	NHL	57	1	10	11	68	7	0	1	1	12
1968–69	Philadelphia Flyers	NHL	9	0	0	0	6	—	—	—	—	—
AHL totals			706	54	232	286	1722	81	6	33	39	205
NHL totals			158	3	16	19	198	12	0	1	1	12

== See also ==
- List of select Jewish ice hockey players

Preceded by None (First)	Philadelphia Flyers TV Color Commentator; 1971–1972	Succeeded by Bobby Taylor
