= Dino Hall =

American football player (born 1955)

No. 1, 26, 34
- Positions: Running back, return specialist

Personal information
- Born: December 6, 1955 (age 70); Atlantic City, New Jersey, U.S.
- Listed height: 5 ft 7 in (1.70 m)
- Listed weight: 165 lb (75 kg)

Career information
- High school: Pleasantville (Atlantic City)
- College: Glassboro State
- NFL draft: 1979: undrafted

Career history
- Cleveland Browns (1979–1983); Portland Breakers (1985)

Career NFL statistics
- Kick return yards: 3,185
- Punt return yards: 901
- Rushing yards: 194
- Stats at Pro Football Reference

Donald Richard "Dino" Hall (born December 6, 1955) is an American former professional football player who was a running back and return specialist in the National Football League (NFL). He was signed by the Cleveland Browns as an undrafted free agent in 1979. He played college football at Glassboro State.

He attended Pleasantville High School.
