= Chris Therien =

Canadian ice hockey player (born 1971)

- Born: December 14, 1971 (age 54) Ottawa, Ontario, Canada
- Height: 6 ft 5 in (196 cm)
- Weight: 235 lb (107 kg; 16 st 11 lb)
- Position: Defence
- Shot: Left
- Played for: Philadelphia Flyers; Dallas Stars
- National team: Canada
- NHL draft: 47th overall, 1990; Philadelphia Flyers
- Playing career: 1994–2006

Christopher Bowie Therien (born December 14, 1971) is a Canadian former professional ice hockey defenceman. He played eleven seasons in the National Hockey League (NHL) with the Philadelphia Flyers and Dallas Stars between 1995 and 2006. He was the lead analyst for Flyers Pregame Live and Flyers Postgame Live on NBC Sports Philadelphia. Prior to the 2018-19 NHL season he was a color commentator inside the glass for the Flyers on NBC Sports Philadelphia. He was also previously the Flyers' radio color commentator on 97.5 The Fanatic. He is currently the lead commentator for Ice Wars International.

== Playing career ==
After registering 35 goals and 37 assists in 31 games for Northwood School in 1989–90, Chris Therien was drafted by the Philadelphia Flyers in the 3rd round, 47th overall of the 1990 NHL entry draft. He attended Providence College for three years and joined the Canadian national team after graduating. He was a member of the Canadian team which won silver at the 1994 Lillehammer Olympics. He started his professional career in 1994 playing for the Hershey Bears of the AHL. Once the NHL Lockout came to an end, he joined the Flyers and played every regular season and playoff game in the abbreviated season, earning a spot on the NHL All-Rookie Team. He enjoyed his best season in 1996–97 by recording a career high in points (24) and plus/minus (+27) in 71 games while helping lead the Flyers to the Stanley Cup Finals. After playing nine and a half seasons with the Flyers, he was traded to the Dallas Stars on March 8, 2004, for a 2004 8th round draft pick and a 2005 3rd round draft pick. He signed a one-year contract to return to the Flyers shortly after the 2004–05 NHL lockout came to an end, and ended up playing in 47 games before having his season cut short due to a head injury.

Known primarily as a defensive defenceman, Therien was usually partnered with Éric Desjardins over the years. He was also well known for elevating his game when matched up against star forward Jaromír Jágr. His teammates took to calling him Bundy after the character Al Bundy from Married... with Children.

Therien took a slapshot that ended the career of Trent McCleary in a game, which McCleary attempted to block. The shot ended up striking McCleary in the throat, which had enough force to damage his larynx. He was critically injured when hit in the throat by the shot which fractured his larynx and resulted in a collapsed lung.

== Personal life ==
Therien and his family have been residents of the Marlton section of Evesham Township, New Jersey.

Therien's autobiography Chris Therien: Road to Redemption was released in October 2022.

== Career statistics ==
=== Regular season and playoffs ===
			Regular season					Playoffs
Season	Team	League	GP	G	A	Pts	PIM	GP	G	A	Pts	PIM
1988–89	Ottawa Junior Senators	CJHL	8	3	1	4	22	—	—	—	—	—
1989–90	Ottawa Junior Senators	CJHL	3	0	2	2	2	—	—	—	—	—
1989–90	Northwood School	HS-NY	31	35	37	72	54	—	—	—	—	—
1990–91	Providence College	HE	36	4	18	22	36	—	—	—	—	—
1991–92	Providence College	HE	36	16	25	41	38	—	—	—	—	—
1992–93	Providence College	HE	33	8	11	19	52	—	—	—	—	—
1992–93	Canadian National Team	Intl	8	1	4	5	8	—	—	—	—	—
1993–94	Canadian National Team	Intl	59	7	15	22	46	—	—	—	—	—
1993–94	Hershey Bears	AHL	6	0	0	0	2	—	—	—	—	—
1994–95	Hershey Bears	AHL	34	3	13	16	37	—	—	—	—	—
1994–95	Philadelphia Flyers	NHL	48	3	10	13	38	15	0	0	0	10
1995–96	Philadelphia Flyers	NHL	82	6	17	23	89	12	0	0	0	18
1996–97	Philadelphia Flyers	NHL	71	2	22	24	64	19	1	6	7	6
1997–98	Philadelphia Flyers	NHL	78	3	16	19	80	5	0	1	1	4
1998–99	Philadelphia Flyers	NHL	74	3	15	18	48	6	0	0	0	6
1999–00	Philadelphia Flyers	NHL	80	4	9	13	66	18	0	1	1	12
2000–01	Philadelphia Flyers	NHL	73	2	12	14	48	6	1	0	1	8
2001–02	Philadelphia Flyers	NHL	77	4	10	14	30	5	0	0	0	2
2002–03	Philadelphia Flyers	NHL	67	1	6	7	36	13	0	2	2	2
2003–04	Philadelphia Flyers	NHL	56	1	9	10	50	—	—	—	—	—
2003–04	Philadelphia Phantoms	AHL	2	0	0	0	0	—	—	—	—	—
2003–04	Dallas Stars	NHL	11	0	0	0	2	5	2	0	2	0
2005–06	Philadelphia Flyers	NHL	47	0	4	4	34	—	—	—	—	—
NHL totals			764	29	130	159	585	104	4	10	14	68

=== International ===
Year	Team	Event	GP	G	A	Pts	PIM
1994	Canada	OLY	4	0	0	0	4
Senior totals			4	0	0	0	4

== Awards and honors ==
Olympic medal record

Men's ice hockey
Silver medal – second place	1994 Lillehammer	Ice Hockey

Award	Year
All-Hockey East Rookie Team	1990–91
All-Hockey East Second Team	1992–93

- 1993–94: Silver Medal (XVII Olympic Winter Games)
- 1994–95: All-Rookie Team (NHL)

== Records ==
- His 753 games played as a Philadelphia Flyer is first among defenseman in Flyers history.
