= Gene Hart =

American sports broadcaster (1931–1999)

- Born: Eugene Charles Hart; June 28, 1931; New York City, New York, U.S.
- Died: July 14, 1999 (aged 68); Cherry Hill, New Jersey, U.S.
- Sports commentary career
- Team: Philadelphia Flyers
- Genre: Play-by-Play
- Sport: Ice hockey

Eugene Charles Hart (June 28, 1931 – July 14, 1999) was an American sports announcer for the Philadelphia Flyers of the National Hockey League (NHL) and the Philadelphia Phantoms of the American Hockey League (AHL).

== Early life ==
Hart was born in New York City in 1931, and soon moved to South Jersey, where he graduated from Pleasantville High School in Pleasantville, New Jersey. He graduated from Trenton State College with a Bachelor of Arts degree in Education. After serving time in the military, Hart began officiating high school football, baseball, and basketball in South Jersey. After one game at Atlantic City High School, the school's athletic broadcaster Ralph Glenn was walking around frantically to find a person to go with him to Trenton to announce a game. He explained his situation to Hart and Hart agreed to go with him, which began his announcing career in ice hockey.

== Broadcasting career ==
Hart continued to announce with Glenn on a regular basis in South Jersey, and kept several side jobs as well, including teaching high school history classes in Medford and Audubon. When Philadelphia was granted an NHL expansion team in 1966, Hart submitted his tapes to the team, which would be called the Flyers. Since the Flyers could not afford one of the more experienced Canadian announcers, Hart got the job. Although he only expected to be on the staff for a few years until the Flyers could afford a better broadcaster, Hart stayed on as the voice of the Philadelphia Flyers for 29 years, from the team's inception until the end of the 1994–95 season. Hart's colleagues as a Flyers announcer included Stu Nahan and Don Earle. Known for his rapid fire delivery, Hart's style was heavily influenced by famous ice hockey broadcaster Foster Hewitt. Like Hewitt, Hart's slightly high pitched, action describing delivery was perfect for both radio and early generation sports television. Hart announced more than 2,000 NHL games, six Stanley Cup Final series, five NHL All-Star Games, and the Super Series. His most famous call came when he announced the end of game 6 of the 1974 Stanley Cup Final:

Ladies and Gentlemen, the Flyers are going to win the Stanley Cup!! The Flyers win the Stanley Cup! The Flyers win the Stanley Cup! The Flyers have won the Stanley Cup!

Hart's call triggered the biggest celebration in Philadelphia sports history. More than two million people attended the parade celebrating the Flyers' win.

His signature goal call was:

He shoots, he scores, for a case of Tastykake!

Tasty Baking Company was (and still is as of 2024) a Philadelphia Flyers sponsor and awards a case of their desserts whenever a Flyers' player scores. The cases are usually given to charity in the player's name.

In the early 1980s, he was also one of the voices of the NHL on USA. His signature phrase, which he used at the end of games, was "Good night and good hockey!" Hart succeeded Hall of Famer Roy Shudt as the announcer at Brandywine Raceway in Wilmington, Delaware, in 1984. He called the horse races there until the track closed in 1989.

Hart and ice hockey historian Bruce C. Cooper co-authored The Hockey Trivia Book published by Leisure Press in 1984, and his autobiography entitled SCORE! (co-authored with Buzz Ringe) was published by Bonus Books in 1990. A feature-length documentary film about Hart's life entitled "All Hart" is in production by Green Creek Films.

Hart did the play-by-play for the 1973 Final of the North American Soccer League (NASL) between the Philadelphia Atoms and Dallas Tornado. Walter Chyzowych, future head coach of the United States men's national soccer team, provided color commentary.

== Post broadcasting career ==
Hart was inducted into the Hockey Hall of Fame in November 1997, receiving the Foster Hewitt Memorial Award. He came out of retirement in 1997 to announce for the Philadelphia Phantoms, the Flyers’ minor league affiliate. He announced the team's Calder Cup championship series before retiring at the end of the 1998–99 season. Hart also was the host of a little-known local radio talk show on WBCB 1490 AM in Bucks County, Pennsylvania. It featured former and current Flyers players and coaches as well as players from the minor league Philadelphia Phantoms.

== Personal life ==
Hart died from a variety of illnesses on July 14, 1999. He had been a resident of Cherry Hill, New Jersey.

Hart's daughter, Lauren Hart, is a professional recording artist, and regular performer of "The Star-Spangled Banner" and "O Canada" before many Flyers home games. She also performs a duet of "God Bless America" with a taped version of Kate Smith on several occasions, especially big games, among them games in the 2010 Stanley Cup Final. She wears number 68 on her Flyers jersey to honor the age of her father when he died. The Broadcast Pioneers of Philadelphia inducted Gene Hart into their Hall of Fame in 2001.
