= Salahi =

Salahi may refer to:

Places

- Salahi, Khuzestan, a village in Razavi Khorasan Province, Iran
- Salahi, Razavi Khorasan, a village in Razavi Khorasan Province, Iran

People

- Adil Salahi, editor of Arab News, a Saudi newspaper
- Michaele and Tareq Salahi ("the Salahis"), known as perpetrators of the 2009 U.S. state dinner security breaches
  - Michaele Salahi, cast member on The Real Housewives of D.C. and ex-wife of Tareq
  - Tareq Salahi, former vintner
- Mohamedou Ould Salahi, author of a memoir of his incarceration at Guantanamo

== See also ==
- Salehi
- Salehi, Iran (disambiguation)
