= Michele S. Jones =

US Army Reserve command sergeant major

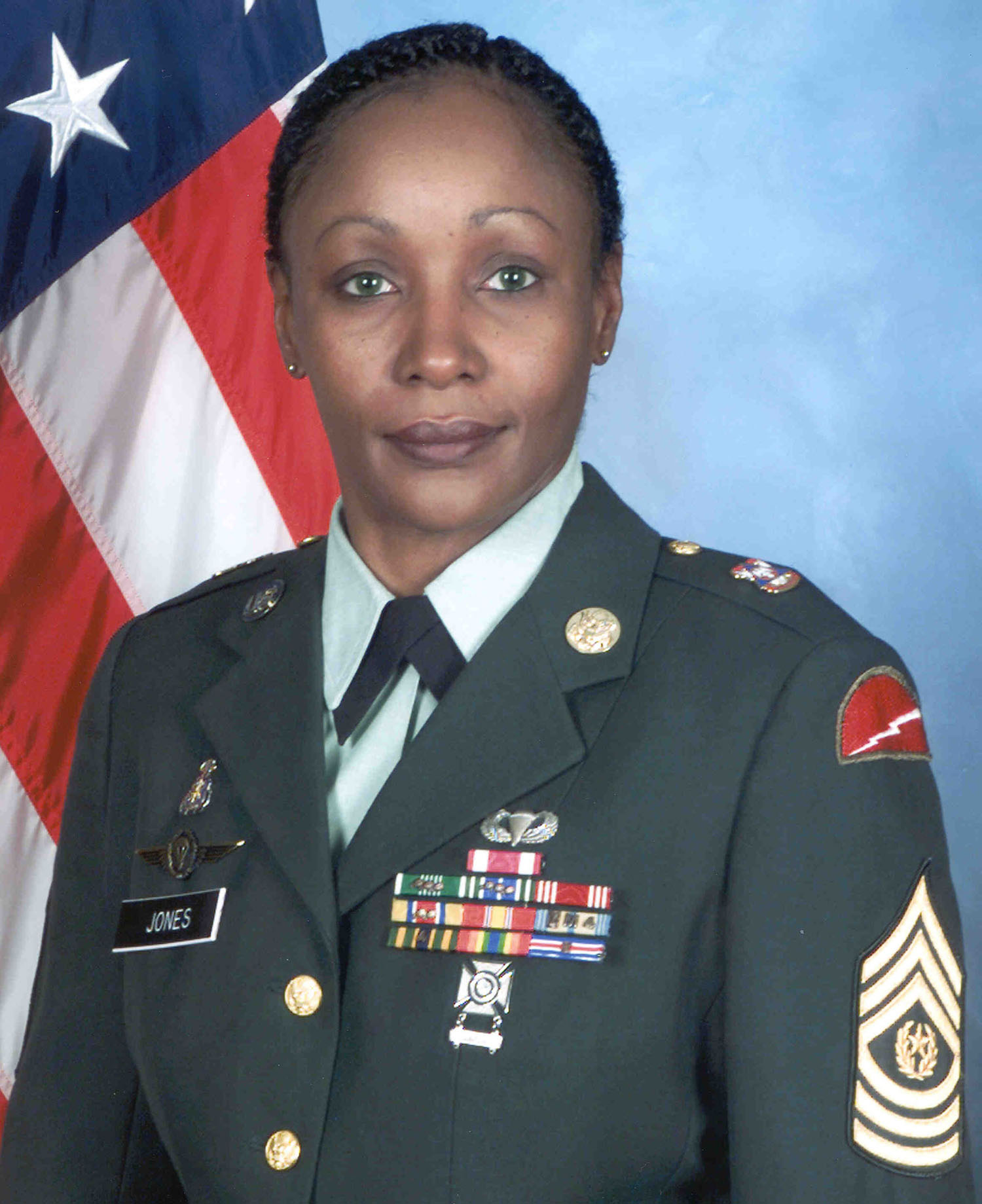
- Command Sergeant Major Michele S. Jones
- Born: 24 November 1962 (age 63); Randallstown, Maryland, United States
- Allegiance: United States
- Branch: United States Army; United States Army Reserve
- Service years: 1982–2007
- Rank: Command Sergeant Major

Michele S. Jones is the first woman in the United States Army Reserve to reach the position of command sergeant major of the U.S. Army Reserve. She is the first female non-commissioned officer to serve in the highest enlisted position of a component of the U.S. Army, active or reserve, and was at one time the highest-ranking African-American female enlisted person in any branch of the United States military, as well as the highest-ranking enlisted African American in the Army Reserve.

Jones serves as Special Assistant to the Secretary of Defense.

== Army career ==
Jones was born 24 November 1962 in Randallstown, Maryland. She grew up in the Baltimore area. She is a graduate of Milford Mill Academy. She was for a time a Baltimore Colts cheerleader. At Fayetteville State University, she graduated cum laude with a Bachelor of Science degree in business administration.

Jones originally joined the U.S. Army because she "liked the uniform" and because none of her friends were joining—she reports that she has "always been an independent thinker". She said she took the advertising slogan to heart, "Be All You Can Be In The Army", and enlisted in September 1982. In her 1997–1998 class of the United States Army Sergeants Major Academy, she became the first female selected as class president.

On 28 October 2002, Jones stepped into the role of command sergeant major of the U.S. Army Reserve, to serve as the principal representative of the enlisted ranks, adviser to the chief of the Army Reserve. She traveled the world, seeking out and initiating solutions to U.S. Army and Army Reserve enlisted personnel resource problems. She served state-side on active duty assignments during the Kosovo War as well as during Operations Desert Shield and Desert Storm and the Global War on Terrorism.

Ebony magazine featured a portrait and short biography of Jones in June 2003, on a one-page monthly feature entitled "Speaking of People". The next month, Jones was honored with the Meritorious Service Award by the NAACP. Jones was pictured in Essence magazine in April 2005 in a photographic essay entitled "The Beautiful Ones: 35 of the Most Remarkable Women in the World", showing 35 African-American women worthy of note.

In her meetings with Army Reservists, Jones often emphasized the basics, such as physical fitness, even for those soldiers who were able to complete their assigned tasks without passing physical fitness examinations. At the Sheridan Army Reserve Center in northwest Baltimore in 2006, she actively demonstrated her stance on the matter to the enlisted leaders of the 80th Division. She slid her body underneath a chair and addressed them from that position: "Let's say you're a soldier and you're a mechanic and you need to get under this Humvee. If you're not physically fit, you may not be able to fit under the vehicle."

== Post-military career ==
In 2007, Jones was profiled in American Black Military Leaders, a book by Walter Lee Hawkins.

She was invited to speak at the 2008 Democratic National Convention. On 27 August, she delivered her text, an endorsement of then-senator Barack Obama. In her speech, she shared her projection of how Obama would serve as commander-in-chief of the military, supporting the common soldier. She said, "He'll fully fund the VA, so all our returning heroes get the quality care they deserve. And when it comes to the national shame of too many homeless veterans, Barack Obama has one simple policy: Zero tolerance."

On 19 May 2009, she was among the four American women given the 2009 Spirit of Democracy Award by the National Coalition on Black Civic Participation. The other awardees were California representative Barbara Lee, actress Sheryl Lee Ralph and magazine editor Susan L. Taylor.

As the former highest ranking enlisted member of the United States Army Reserve, President Barack Obama appointed Jones to continue service as a civilian at the Department of Defense to the Special Assistant to Robert Gates, the United States secretary of defense. In this position, Jones is the Pentagon-based liaison to the White House.

During Jones' time working with Secretary Gates in the Obama administration, employment transition for Reserve, Guard and Active Component Members of the US military was targeted to streamline within the OPM system and automatically identified for federal employment opportunity hiring. This effort led to OPM's official Program of Record: "Feds Hire Vets".

Jones was briefly in entertainment news when film crews and characters on Bravo's The Real Housewives of D.C. gained access to the White House for a US state dinner with the prime minister of India without invitation. Jones had repeatedly told the Bravo representatives that she had no tickets for them. She released an official White House statement saying, "I specifically stated that they did not have tickets and in fact that I did not have the authority to authorize attendance, admittance or access to any part of the evening's activities. Even though I informed them of this, they still decided to come."

== Personal life ==
Jones has been reported as living in Washington, D.C., in 2003 and in Baltimore, Maryland, in 2004. She now lives in Jacksonville, Florida. She enjoys traveling, skiing, dancing to salsa music, and she exercises using the regimen Tae Bo. She is single and has adopted four girls, all having the same birth mother.
