= America's Polo Cup =

American annual polo competition (2007–2010)

The America's Polo Cup was a polo event held annually in the United States of America from 2007 to 2010, but was declared bankrupt on September 13, 2010. The event was organized by Tareq and Michaele Salahi, through their business "America's Polo Cup Inc.", with varying degrees of support from sponsors. Because the match was unsanctioned by the Federation of International Polo, it was largely considered a spectator event. The event attracted controversy because of financial issues surrounding the event, including allegations of: nonpayment of vendors; charity funding issues; and sponsors' names and marks being used without their consent.

== History ==
=== 2007 ===
On May 12, the United Kingdom defeated America 7-3 at Morven Park in Leesburg, Virginia.

=== 2008 ===
America defeated Italy 6-2 at Morven Park in Leesburg, Virginia.

=== 2009 ===
On May 9, America defeated Australia 4-2 at the Capitol Polo Club in Poolesville, Maryland.

=== 2010 ===
The 2010 match took place on June 12 on the National Mall in Washington, D.C., with teams announced as United States and India. The advertised ticket price for the event was $95 per person. The event had an attendance of about 250 people, with food from Popeyes Louisiana Kitchen. Reports of the event stated that, unlike previous years, when a team of players from the visiting country did travel to America for the event, the players that the Salahi's claimed were from India admitted that they were actually Americans of Pakistani origin, from Florida. A spokesman for the Embassy of India stated that neither the Embassy nor the government of India had any association with the event.

The event's website reportedly identified an Indian company, Kingfisher Beer, as a sponsor. However, Kingfishers' chief executive denied that the company had sponsored the event. Yashpal Singh, the president and chief executive of Mendocino Brewing Company, Kingfisher's parent company, reportedly stated, "We are not sponsoring this event and have informed the people managing this event of that, .... We have sent legal notices to this effect, and he keeps on advertising us as a sponsor. I don't know what world he's living in."

On September 13, 2010, the business "America's Polo Cup Inc." filed for Chapter 7 bankruptcy.

== Controversy ==
Allegations of fraud over previous years caused a number of organizations to withdraw sponsorship in 2009 and 2010.

In 2009, Land Rover terminated its sponsorship after a charity created by the Salahis was put under investigation by the Virginia Office of Consumer Affairs, finding that it was not a legitimate charity. The organization, Journey for the Cure, solicited donations of cash or auction items as part of their stated mission to support science grants and other funding for cures of multiple sclerosis and cancer, but was never incorporated as a 501(c) charity.

Before the 2010 event, the Embassy of India, Land Rover, Ritz Carlton, and the St. Regis Hotels terminated their sponsorship after the Sahali's November 2009 White House gatecrashing incident.
