= Interlock (engineering) =

Feature that makes two mechanisms mutually interdependent

An interlock is a feature or device that is commonly used in engineering and safety systems to keep machines, devices, and processes from operating until the guards are in place or the required circumstances are met. When being utilized, interlocks are used to prevent or reduce the chances of injury to the operator, damage to the equipment, and actions being completed in the wrong order or in an unsafe way.

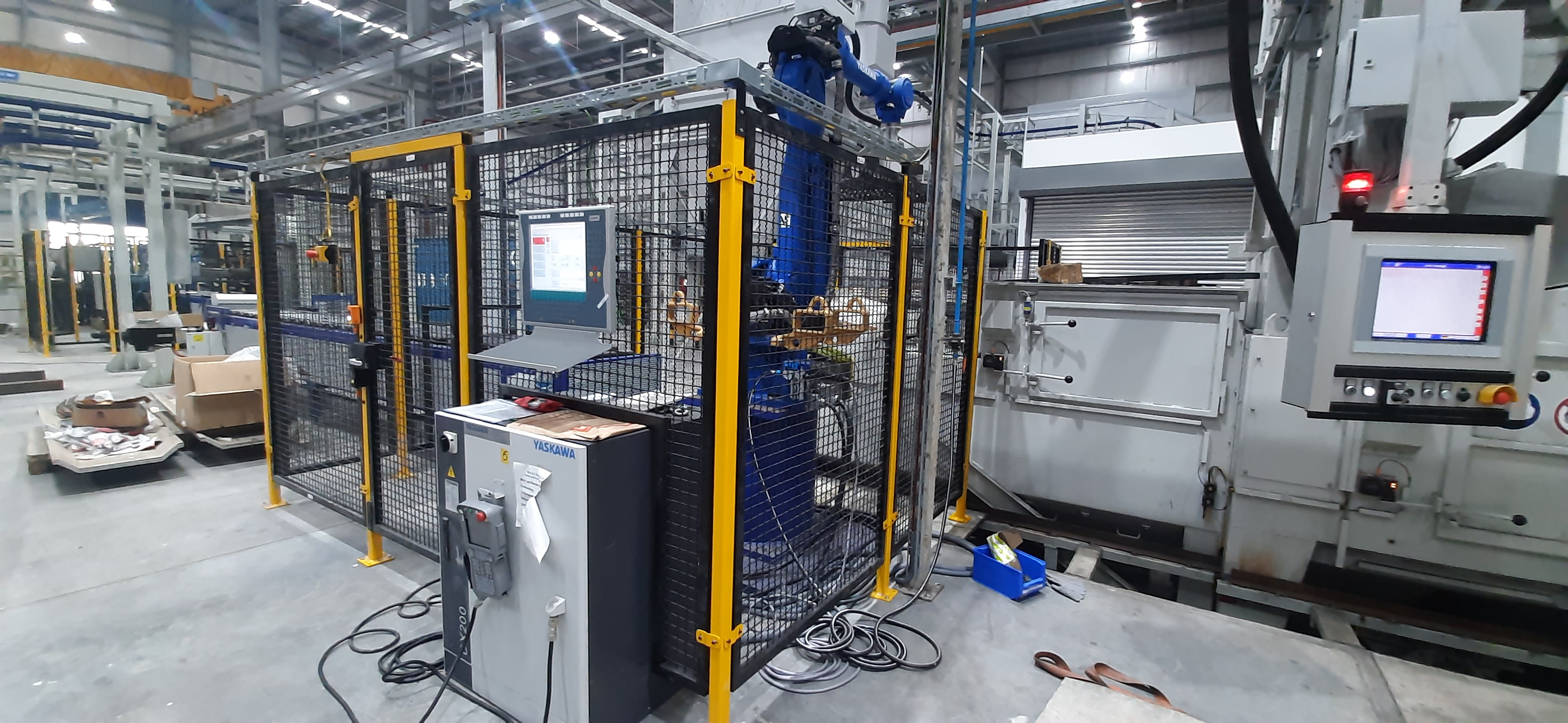
Example of guarding for machinery

Interlocks in machinery safety are often connected to guards, gates, and other access-prevention devices so that hazards cannot occur while those devices are removed or open. Without interlocks, operators risk exposure to moving parts, unexpected startup, and stored energy.

== Types of interlocks ==
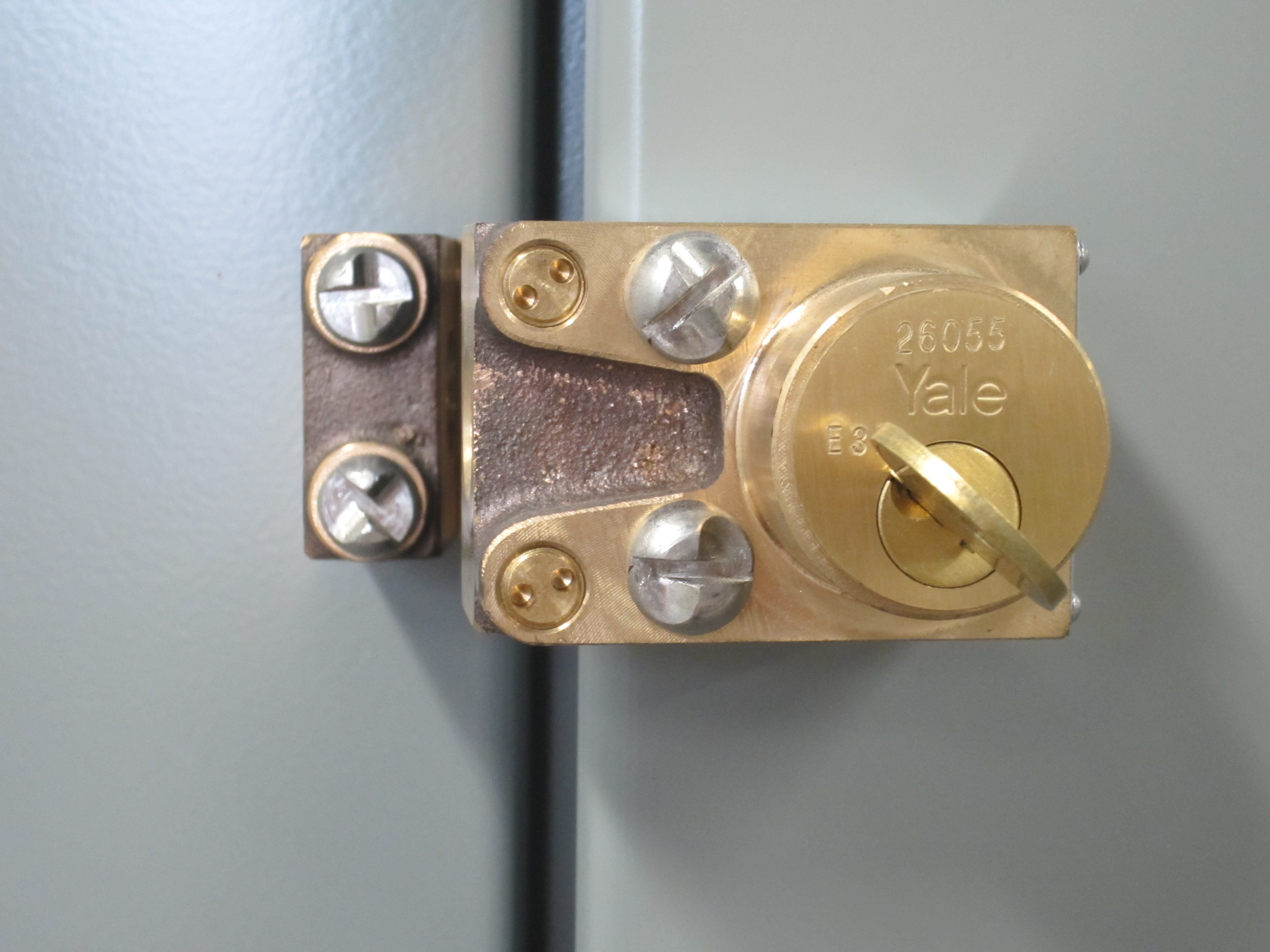
Example of a mechanical interlock

Interlocks can generally be classified mostly into three types: mechanical, electrical, and software-based interlocks. Mechanical interlocks are typically physical parts that block movement or operator access until the proper tool or circumstance is met. Electrical interlocks often use sensors, relays, and switches to interrupt the operation while the guard, gate, or other access-prevention device is not in place. Software-based interlocks can be implemented by using computer logic or control logic such as Programmable Logic Controllers (PLCs).

An industrial example of an interlock can be seen in an interlocked guard connected to a machine. In this setup, the machine cannot accidentally stop or start until the guard is in its proper position. Similar interlocks can also be used on gates around robotic cells as well as access panels around hazardous equipment.

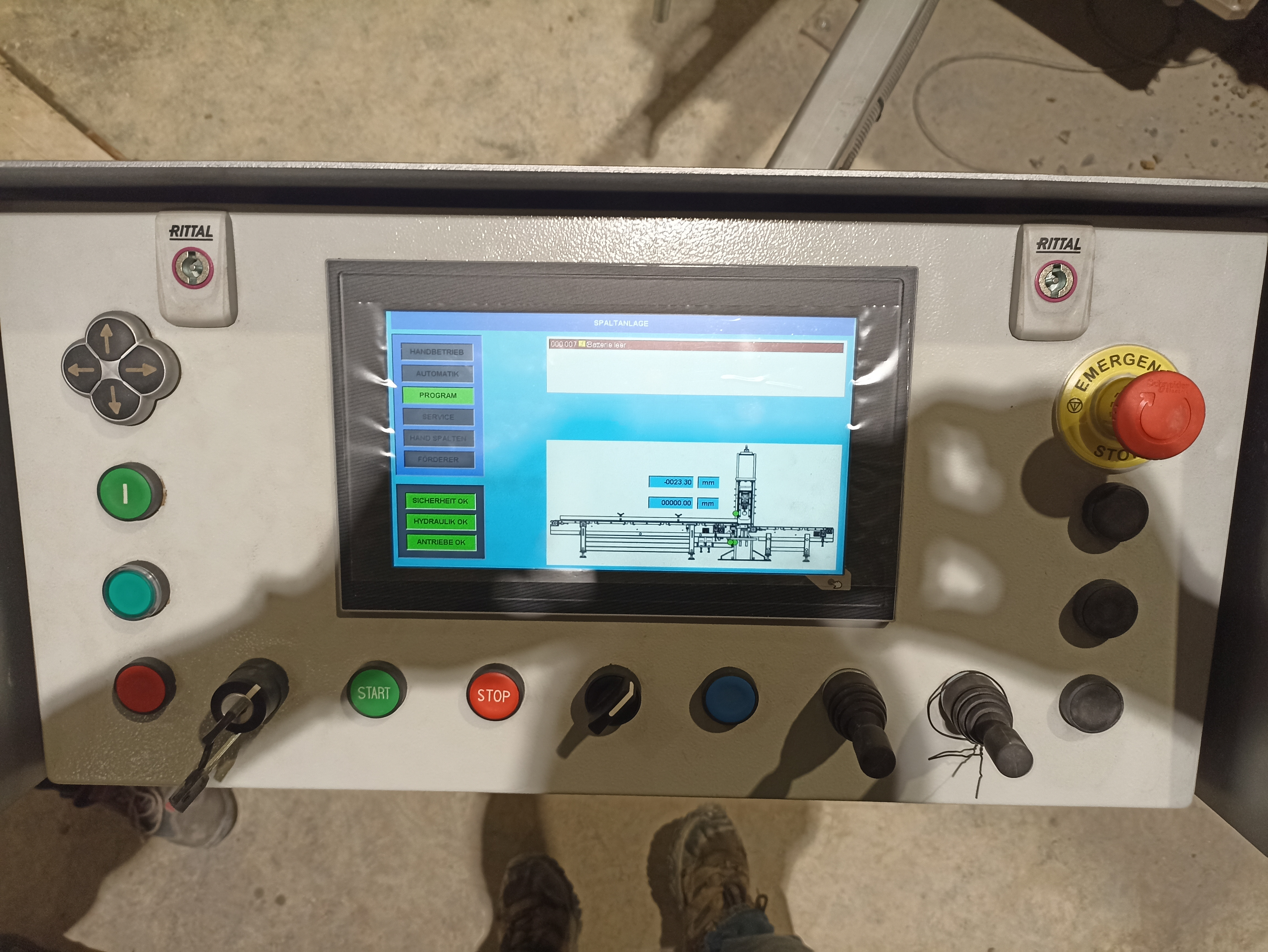
Example of a software-based interlock in the form of a Programmable Logic Controller

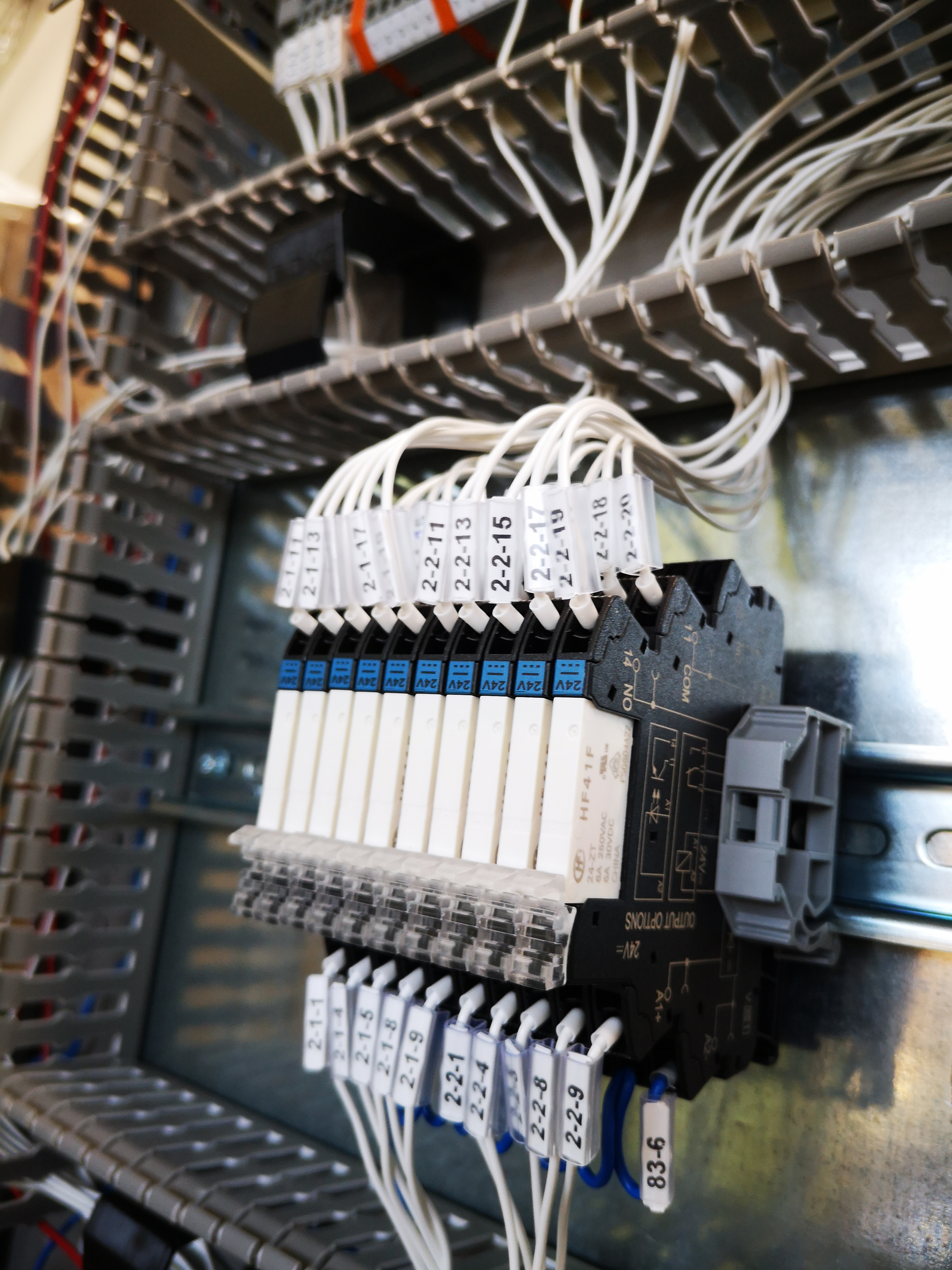
Example of an electrical interlock (Relay)

== Applications of interlocks ==
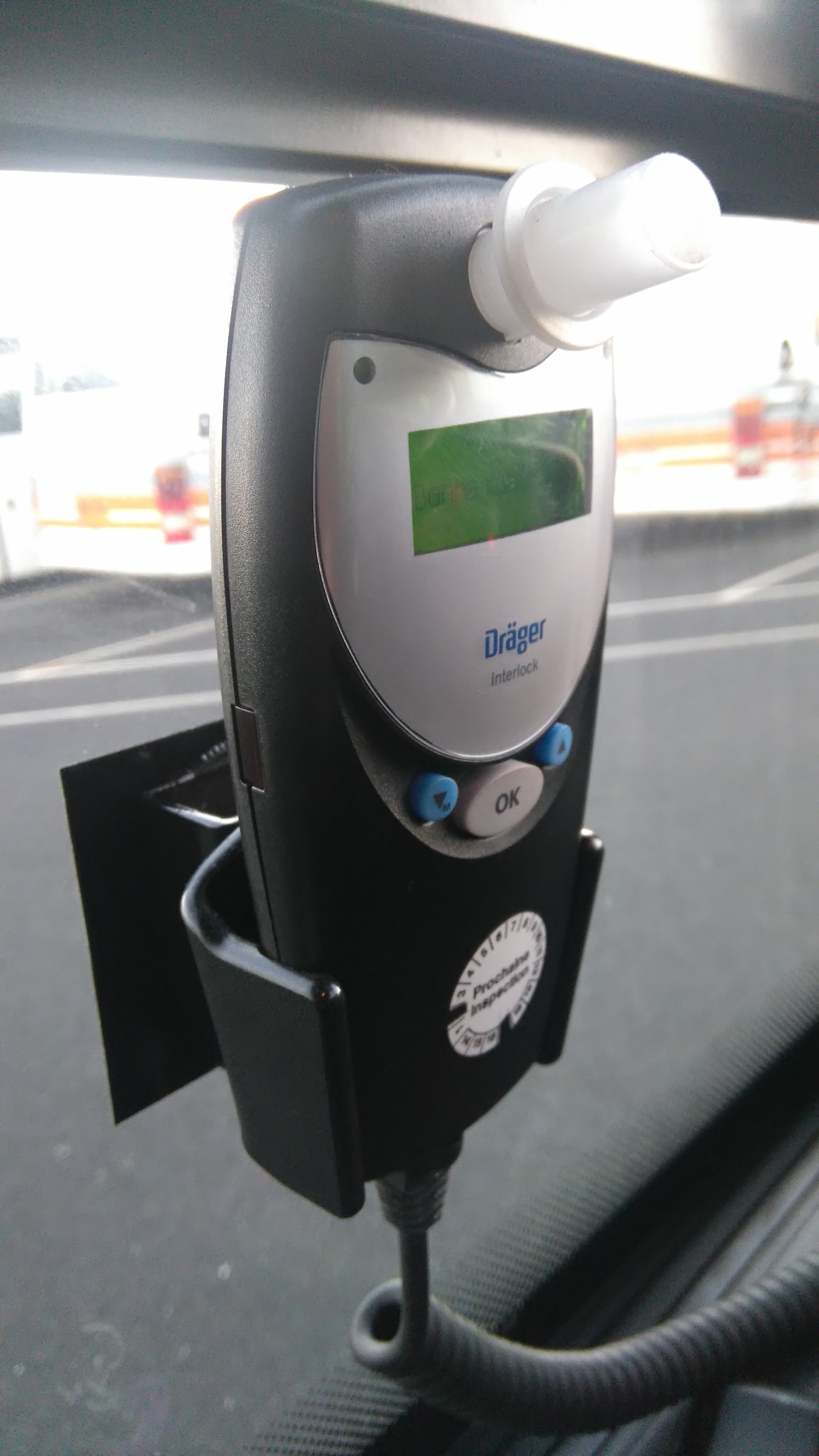
Example of a Ignition Interlock Device

Interlocks are used across a wide range of industries. In manufacturing, they are commonly part of machine guarding systems intended to keep equipment from running while the operator is exposed to hazardous parts and subsystems. Interlocks can also be applied to automated processes where they help ensure that operations happen in the correct order and only when required circumstances have been met. Outside of industrial applications, interlocks are also used to prevent driving while under the influence of alcohol. These are commonly referred to as Ignition Interlock Devices, which are essentially in-car breathalyzers that prevents the driver from operating the vehicle when their Breath Alcohol Content (BrAC) reaches or exceeds a certain threshold.

Because interlocks are closely tied to machine guarding and energy control, they often get discussed alongside lockout/tagout (LOTO) requirements and other safety measures. However, the purpose of an interlock is not to replace well established safety procedures but rather to function as part of a safety system intended to reduce the risk of unexpected startups and stops, hazardous motion, and the accidental release of stored energy.

== Standards and regulation of interlocks ==
International Organization for Standardization Logo with red background

Standards and regulations related to interlocks are often found in connection with occupational safety requirements for machine guarding and hazardous-energy control. In the United States, Occupational Safety and Health Administration (OSHA) requires that one or more methods of guarding are to be provided to protect the operators and other employees from machine hazards, while OSHA's LOTO standard addresses the dangers of unexpected energization or startup during servicing and maintenance. Another example of an American industry standard comes from the American National Standards Institute (ANSI) in the B11 series, which addresses machine safeguards and risk reduction tactics in machinery safety.

Outside of the United States, interlocking devices are addressed by standards published by the International Organization for Standardization (ISO). ISO 14119:2024 outlines the principles for designing and selecting interlocking devices that are associated with guards and includes ways to prevent or reduce defeat or bypass of those devices.

== Limitations of interlocks ==
While interlocks are very useful and widely used as safety measures, they are not fully effective by themselves if they are damaged, bypassed, improperly maintained, or not integrated into a safeguarding plan. In practice, accidents involving interlocks have been documented in incidents involving machinery. Many accident summaries related to interlocks involve an operator that deliberately bypasses the interlock while working on machinery.

== See also ==
- Fail-safe
- Railway interlocking
- Breath alcohol ignition interlock device
- Safety instrumented system
- Piggybacking
- Tailgating
- Lockout-tagout
