= Piggyback attack =

Form of wiretapping

A Piggyback attack is an active form of wiretapping where the attacker gains access to a system via intervals of inactivity in another user's legitimate connection. It is also called a “between the line attack” or "piggyback-entry wiretapping".

In security, piggybacking refers to when someone tags along with another person who is authorized to gain entry into a restricted area. The term is applied to computer networks in this context.
