= Polo Cup =

Polo Cup may refer to:

== Water polo ==
- Montenegrin Water Polo Cup, national water polo cup played in Montenegro
- Greek Water Polo Cup
- Croatian Water Polo Cup
- Asian Water Polo Cup
- Serbian Water Polo Cup
- FINA Water Polo World Cup of the Fédération Internationale de Natation

== Horseback polo ==
- International Polo Cup, also called the Newport Cup and the Westchester Cup, it is a trophy in polo that was created in 1876
- America's Polo Cup, polo event held annually in America from 2007 to 2010

== Motorsport ==
- ADAC Volkswagen Polo Cup
