= Gate crashing =

Entering, attending, or participating in an event without invitation

Gate crashing, gatecrashing, or party crashing is the act of entering, attending, or participating in an event without an invitation or ticket.

The term has also come to be used to refer to intrusions on videographed sessions, such as interviews and news reports, either by parties the video producers did not intend to feature or by unforeseen, often whimsical, acts. This can easily occur when a subject is interviewed at home, as has become common in the 21st century and was especially so during lockdowns ordered by governments during the worldwide COVID-19 pandemic.

Various techniques that involve blending in with the crowd can be used to gain access to some events. Examples of blending in can include wearing the proper attire or participating in the event activities. Various measures can be taken to prevent gate crashers from gaining access such as increasing security, requiring credentials or checking invitations at the door. Regardless of prevention, such measures can still be thwarted by a skilled gate crasher.

The first "how to" gate-crashing book, Meet the Stars, was written by Charlotte Laws in 1988. She went by the name Missy Laws at the time and details how she crashed dozens of celebrity-filled events, major award shows and even got past Secret Service to interview the president. Her story about Elvis was reprinted in Uncle John's Bathroom Reader. Her memoirs, Undercover Debutante (2019) and Rebel in High Heels (2015), include some of her gate crashing escapades.

== See also ==
- Peter Hore
- Piggybacking (security)
- 2009 U.S. state dinner security breaches
- Wedding Crashers – 2005 romantic comedy film
- Trespassing
