= Tareq Salahi =

American vintner, white house intruder and former public official

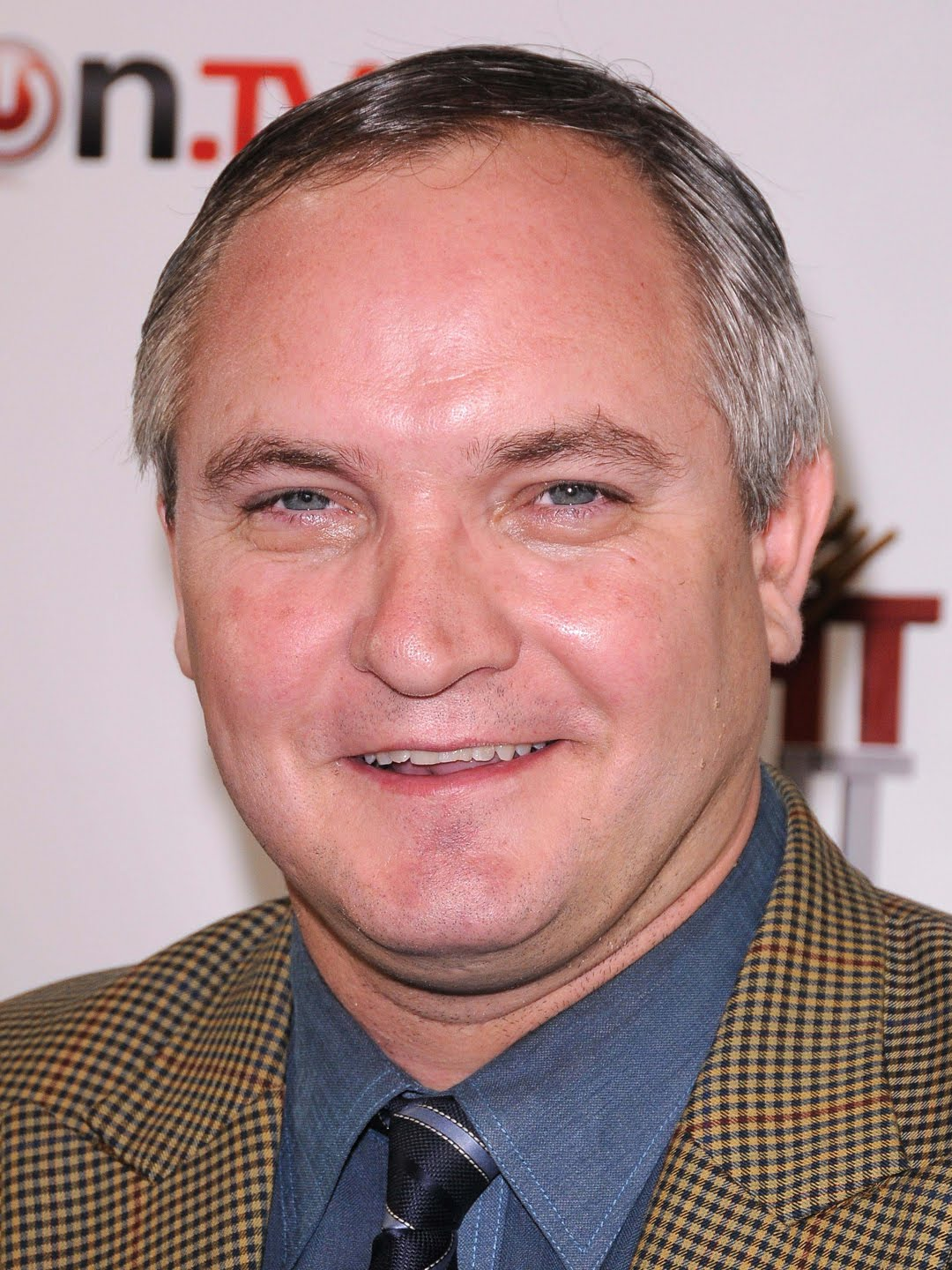
- Born: Tareq Dirgham Salahi
- Education: University of California, Davis
- Occupations: vintner; former public official; travel/tourism expert; television personality
- Spouses: Michaele Salahi (m. 2003; div. 2012) Lisa Spoden (m. 2016)
- Relatives: Moustapha Al Akkad
- Awards: National Arena Championships Chairmans Cup 2020,2021
- Website: www.tareqsalahi.org

Tareq Dirgham Salahi is an American man who became known for attending a White House state dinner as an uninvited guest in 2009. Salahi has appeared in two reality-television shows: Where the Elite Meet, and NBC Universal/Bravo's The Real Housewives of D.C.

== Early life and education ==
Salahi's father, Dirgham Salahi, was a Palestinian immigrant who came to the United States from Jerusalem, and he was likely a refugee of the 1948 Arab-Israeli War. His mother, Corinne, is from Belgium. Dirgham was educated as a petroleum geologist and worked in the Middle East and U.S. He retired and settled in Virginia, where he became owner of an estate farm, which he subsequently turned into one of the first Virginia Farm Wineries. Corinne Salahi is the founder and director of the Montessori School of Alexandria, Virginia.

Salahi attended primary school at Ascension Academy in Alexandria and high school at the Randolph-Macon Academy in Front Royal, Virginia where he graduated in 1987. He graduated from the University of California, Davis in 1994 with a bachelor's degree in oenology and business management.

== Career ==
=== Oasis Winery ===
In 1977, Salahi's father Dirgham planted Chardonnay, Cabernet Sauvignon and Merlot vines at Oasis Vineyard, establishing the fifth winery in Virginia. Salahi's 1999 champagne was named in the "Top 10 Best Champagne and Sparkling Wines in the World" by Wine Enthusiast magazine.

According to court papers, Salahi also began operating a new business on the same premises as his father's Oasis Vineyard, called Oasis Enterprises. Oasis Enterprises included a wine tourism operation, wine country tours, and an events-and-catering business. A dispute arose between Salahi and his family regarding business matters between Oasis Vineyard and Oasis Enterprises. A lawsuit was filed in which the ill mother of the Salahi family alleged, according to court filings, that assets were misdirected to Oasis Enterprises from the winery to support tourism initiatives. Salahi fought the charges and made counter allegations against his parents and their lawyer. He began to seek investors to buy the property from his parents, but no deal was ever reached. The winery temporarily ceased operations, and the lawsuit was dropped without resolution.

Oasis Vineyard filed for bankruptcy protection in 2008, with its winery assets auctioned in late 2011. Oasis Enterprises filed for bankruptcy in 2009. Dirgham Salahi died on October 6, 2010, and Tareq issued a statement that read "In recent days, we have come together as a family."

In mid-2011, Salahi's wife, Michaele Salahi, was sued by two different parties for fraudulently taking payment for wine tours that were never delivered. On April 23, 2012, the Attorney General of Virginia, Ken Cuccinelli II, filed suit against Salahi's wife Michaele for violating the Virginia Consumer Protection Act for failing to conduct tours that were purchased, failing to provide refunds for canceled tours and other companies as official partners that had relationship with her business. Soon afterwards, Tareq announced that he would run against Cucinelli in the 2013 election for Governor of Virginia.

In May 2013, the land and buildings of the former Oasis Winery was sold at auction for $1.1 million in order to satisfy creditors, marking the end of the Salahi family involvement with Oasis Winery. Salahi's mother Corinne was the sole beneficial owner of the property at the time of sale.

In May 2016, the website vinoshipper.com started selling two wines with the label "The Real Housewinos", a reference to Salahi's appearance on The Real Housewives of D.C.

Tareq Salahi managed to retain the trademark for Oasis Wines and is currently distributing wine under the Oasis Wines and Celebration Wines names. He is also a travel agent operating charters as Hotels at Sea and Resorts at Sea.

=== Public service ===
Salahi sat on the board of the American Task Force. an organization that worked closely with the heads of state from the United States, Jordan, Israel & Palestine dedicated to the peaceful two state solution between Israel & Palestine (see: United Nations Security Council Resolution 242).

In 2002, the Leukemia and Lymphoma Society named him National Man of the Year, due to him raising $120,000 for the charity.

Virginia Governor Jim Gilmore appointed Salahi in 2000 to a three-year term on the Virginia Wine Board. At the conclusion of that term, Virginia Governor Mark Warner nominated Salahi as chairman of the Virginia Wine Tourism Office. Salahi was one of 15 board members of the Virginia Tourism Corporation, a "board that shapes Virginia's tourism policy", appointed by Gov. Tim Kaine in 2006. Kaine told MSNBC:

Tareq had served on the state's wine board under both Gov. Gilmore and Gov. Warner, and when his term on the wine board finished, he and the tourism board wanted him on that board because he's a great promoter—you won't be surprised to hear me say that.

During his time in office the Virginia Wineway, Loudoun Wine Trail, Blue Ridge Wineway and Virginia Wineries Alliance were created, attracting, according to a USDA study, 980,000 wine tourists to the state, of which 336,000 visited Piedmont wineries.

After the White House security breach incident in 2009, Virginia Senate Majority Leader Tommy Norment wrote a letter to Gov. Kaine asking for Salahi's removal from the board: "Mr. Salahi's recent outrageous behavior and personal promotion in regards to trespassing in the White House is not the face we need for Virginia tourism...I would appreciate you taking swift action to avoid any further negative situations." Salahi resigned from the Virginia Tourism Board on December 7, 2009.

=== Polo ===
Salahi took up polo at 16. He was a regular competitor on the U.S. National Team and his Oasis squad won two U.S. Polo Association National Arena Titles in 1997 and 1998.

Salahi was involved with sponsoring the Courage Cup in 2006, a polo charity event to raise funds for urban youth to experience equestrian activities. That year, he captained the United States Polo Team against Charles, Prince of Wales. A dispute over control, vendor payment, and use of proceeds from the Courage Cup reportedly led the Salahis to found the America's Polo Cup in 2007. Allegations of misuse of proceeds from the new charitable event arose, and in December 2009 the Virginia Department of Agriculture and Consumer Services opened an investigation into the annual event.

The 2010 America's Polo Cup match took place on June 12 on the National Mall in Washington, D.C., with teams announced as United States and India. The advertised ticket price for the event was $95 per person. The event had an attendance of about 250 people, with food from Popeyes Louisiana Kitchen and PF Chang's China Bistro. Reports of the event stated that the players who represented India were actually of Pakistani origin and were from Florida. A spokesman for the Embassy of India stated that neither the Embassy nor the government of India had any association with the event. The event's website and the US team's uniforms identified an Indian company, Kingfisher Beer, as a sponsor. A spokesperson for Kingfisher denied that the company had sponsored the event. Yashpal Singh, the president and chief executive of Mendocino Brewing Company, Kingfisher's parent company, stated,

We are not sponsoring this event and have informed the people managing this event of that. ... We have sent legal notices to this effect, and he keeps on advertising us as a sponsor. I don't know what world he's living in.

The America's Polo Cup filed for Chapter 7 bankruptcy in October 2010.

Teams to which Salahi belonged won the National Arena Championship Chairman's Cup and the USPA National Challenge Cup during 2020. A team that Salahi captained won one of the most recognizable polo matches in the world at the Bentley & Stella Artois World Championships in November of that year.

=== 2009 U.S. state dinner security breaches ===
In June 2005, while he was a Senator, Barack Obama had posed for a photo with the Salahis and the Black Eyed Peas at the 12th annual Rock the Vote Awards Dinner at the National Building Museum. The Salahis also breached the September 26, 2009, dinner for the Congressional Black Caucus, where the couple posed for photos with Rep. Chuck Rangel and Star Jones, then were asked to leave by security. On the December 2, 2009, Today Show, they claimed they were given tickets to that event by the Gardner Law Group, but caucus spokeswoman Muriel Cooper refuted that claim.

"The first the White House security detail knew of their blunder in allowing them into [the November 24, 2009, state dinner] was when the couple posted photographs from the dinner on their Facebook page." Invited guest Brian Williams, anchor of the NBC Nightly News, observed the Salahis' SUV being turned away from the East Gate entrance. After that, he saw the Salahis and crew leave their vehicle and walk to the White House. They entered through two security checkpoints; only one of them checked for photo ID. The White House on November 27 released photos of the couple posing with President Obama, Vice President Joe Biden, Chief of Staff Rahm Emanuel, and other celebrities in attendance.

Secret Service director Mark Sullivan issued a statement on November 27 saying that the Secret Service was "deeply concerned and embarrassed by the circumstances surrounding the State Dinner". Sullivan's statement also pointed out that "the preliminary findings of our internal investigation have determined established protocols were not followed at an initial checkpoint, verifying that two individuals were on the guest list. Although these individuals went through magnetometers and other levels of screening, they should have been prohibited from entering the event entirely. That failing is ours."

Representative Peter T. King, a Republican of New York, wrote a letter to the United States House Committee on Homeland Security requesting an investigation into this incident. The Secret Service also considered criminal charges against the Salahis. Salahi and Michelle were subpoenaed to attend the House Committee to give evidence but he refused to testify, pleading the Fifth in response to every question.

=== Journey for the Cure Foundation ===
In 2009, Salahi's then-wife Michaele was listed as the director of the Journey for the Cure Foundation connected to the rock band Journey. The Virginia Department of Agriculture and Consumer Services' Office of Consumer Affairs issued a press release that cautioned consumers that "Journey for the Cure Foundation, 14141 Hume Road, Hume, Virginia, has solicited contributions from Virginia citizens for allegedly charitable purposes. However, as of May 13, 2009, this organization had not registered with or been granted the appropriate exempt status by the Commissioner as required by law".

On February 28, 2012, the Virginia Attorney General's office announced a settlement with Salahi, where he would pay a fine for the violations. According to the attorney general:

Journey for the Cure claimed on its Internet web site that "proudly, 100% of our financing goes directly to find the cure and we have no paid staff." Based on bank records obtained through the Virginia Office of Consumer Affairs' (OCA) investigation, the attorney general alleged that only 33% of JCF's expenditures in 2007, and 0.6% of its expenditures in 2008 went directly to disease prevention-related charities. Significant amounts were instead spent on fund raising overhead

The attorney general's office also alleged that the charity filed inaccurate financial statement with state regulators, and solicited in Virginia from 2004 to 2009 without obtaining the proper registration. It also failed to maintain proper fiscal records and failed to provide the state with required financial information when it stopped soliciting contributions there in 2010.

Salahi's wife at the time was accused of personally violating the solicitation of contributions law by signing a notice that said the foundation was registered with the Office of Consumer Affairs when it was not, and signing a registration statement that made false claims about the foundation's financial information and history.

In the settlement agreement, Salahi agreed to pay on behalf of his wife $2,500 in civil penalties and $7,500 to compensate Virginia for attorney fees, and the Journey for the Cure organization will pay $25,000 in civil penalties.

=== Reality television appearances ===
Salahi has appeared in two reality TV shows (detailed below), and documentaries have been made about the White House security breach incident.

In 2009, Saturday Night Live performed a parody of the White House security breach incident.

The Salahis appeared in 2010 on the reality television show The Real Housewives of D.C. The couple clashed with other featured cast members, and the conflicts continued after the show aired. The production was not flattering to the Salahis, and included coverage of the White House gate crashing in detail. Critics have noted that the show's producers edited the material in ways that exaggerated the truth.

In 2014, Salahi lost a celebrity boxing match to Jose Canseco on a DirecTV pay per view special.

=== 2013 Virginia gubernatorial election ===
On April 25, 2012, Salahi announced his candidacy as a Republican for Governor of Virginia in the 2013 Virginia gubernatorial election. When making his announcement, Salahi stated that his candidacy would avenge a lawsuit that Virginia Attorney General Ken Cuccinelli II, who was hoping to become the Republican gubernatorial nominee, had recently brought against him. He added that the lawsuit had made him realize the amount of taxpayer money that politicians waste. On December 4, 2012, Salahi announced the establishment of the website "Crashthevote.com" to promote his candidacy. The website stated that his platform included: Promoting the Commonwealth of Virginia; Promoting the Military, both our troops and defense workers; Increasing Jobs; Pro-Business; Pro-Tourism; Pro-Agriculture; Less Tax; Kill the Car Tax; Pro Eco-Friendly Energy Production.

On January 14, 2013, Salahi announced that he would run for governor of Virginia as an independent. He stated that he had been informed that his refusal in December to sign a pledge of support for all 2013 Republican candidates could disqualify him from the Republican nomination process. He explained that he could not "agree with anything that Cuccinelli believes in."

Salahi failed to submit the necessary signatures to the Virginia State Board of Elections by the June 11, 2013, deadline and did not appear on the ballot as an independent. He transitioned his run into a write-in campaign and said he would pursue a congressional seat if he didn't win the governorship. Salahi was also scheduled to have a film document his campaign by Campbell Media Group, but the production company faced legal allegations for targeting and scamming its film subjects.

Salahi was one of two declared write-in candidates for Governor, along with John Parmele Jr., a Navy retiree. All write-in candidates received 11,087 votes, 0.49% of the total votes cast.

=== 2014 Congressional election ===
In December 2013, Salahi announced that he was running in the Republican primary for Virginia's 10th congressional district in the 2014 elections, to succeed Frank Wolf, the retiring Republican incumbent. However, he withdrew from the 10th's Republican primary and switched to the Independent Greens in March 2014 to run for Virginia's 7th congressional district seat currently held by Eric Cantor. Salahi attempted to collect 1,000 signatures to get on the ballot. In June 2014, Salahi submitted 2,051 signatures to the Virginia State Board of Elections, but only 480 of them were valid and he did not appear on the ballot.

== Personal life ==
Salahi met Michaele Holt at a 2000 baby shower thrown in McLean, Virginia by real estate agent N. Casey Margenau and his wife Molly. They married in 2003 at the Cathedral of St. Matthew the Apostle in Washington, D.C. The reception was held at the Salahi family winery and was prepared by 46 chefs, hosted in a 36,000-square-foot (3,300 m^{2}) tent, and culminated with a thirty-minute fireworks display and an eight-foot wedding cake. The guest list included 1,836 guests, including Supreme Court Justice Anthony Kennedy and former U.S. Ambassador to Ireland Margaret Heckler and numerous high-profile US State Department, CIA, US Senate, US Congressional and other high-profile diplomatic guests. The wedding was repeatedly postponed, prompting US Supreme Court Justice Kennedy to quip that he needed to issue "subpoenas" to the bride and groom.

On September 13, 2011, Salahi reported Michaele missing and perhaps kidnapped after Michaele had phoned him to say that she was on her way to her mother's house, but, according to her mother, had not arrived. She was located soon afterward when law enforcement authorities discovered she had run off with Neal Schon, guitarist for the rock band Journey, and had not wanted Salahi to know where she was. Michaele had met Schon earlier and had remained in a very close friendship with him.

On September 16, 2011, Salahi filed for divorce from Michaele on the grounds of adultery and abandonment or separation.

Salahi refiled the case shortly thereafter with amendments, but Michaele also filed for divorce on December 15, 2011, citing the grounds of 'threatening her and committing violence against her, cruelty and constructive desertion.' On December 22, 2011, Salahi responded to Michaele's divorce suit with a new filing for divorce on the grounds of adultery, desertion and constructive desertion.

On August 20, 2012, Judge Dennis L. Hupp granted a final divorce decree to the Salahis following a contentious settlement proceeding. Hupp also entered a sealed order for a $50 million personal injury lawsuit that Salahi had filed against the entertainment company, Journey, Schon and Nomata. Hupp placed the settlement, including the divorce decree, under seal.

On January 1, 2016, Salahi married his business partner, Lisa Spoden.
