= Salehi =

Salehi (Persian: صالحی) is an Iranian surname. Notable people with the surname include:

- Ali Akbar Salehi, Iranian academic and politician
- Alvin Salehi, American technology entrepreneur, attorney and angel investor
- Ataollah Salehi, Iranian general
- Djavad Salehi-Isfahani, Iranian economist
- Elham Salehi, Iranian para-athlete
- Jahan Salehi, Iranian-American entrepreneur
- Jawad Salehi, Iranian electrical and computer engineer
- Nouria Salehi, Afghan-Australian nuclear physicist and humanitarian
- Parastoo Salehi, Iranian actress
- Toomaj Salehi, Iranian rapper
- Payam Salehi, Iranian singer & guitarist

== See also ==
- Salahi (disambiguation)
