= Salehi, Iran =

Salehi (Persian: صالحي) may refer to:

- Salehi, Markazi

== See also ==
- Salahi (disambiguation)
