= The Real Housewives of D.C. =

American reality television series

- Genre: Reality television
- Created by: Scott Dunlop
- Starring: Mary Amons; Lynda Erkiletian; Cat Ommanney; Michaele Salahi; Stacie Scott Turner
- Country of origin: United States
- Original language: English
- No. of seasons: 1
- No. of episodes: 11

Production
- Executive producers: Sean Gallagher; Abby Greensfelder
- Camera setup: Multiple
- Running time: 41–43 minutes
- Production company: Half Yard Productions

Original release
- Network: Bravo
- Release: August 5 – October 21, 2010

The Real Housewives of D.C., abbreviated RHODC, is an American reality television series that premiered on Bravo on August 5, 2010. Developed as the fifth installment of The Real Housewives franchise, it aired for one season and documented the personal and professional lives of women residing in or near Washington, D.C. It was the first installment to be officially canceled by Bravo.

== Cast ==
- Mary Schmidt Amons, 43, philanthropist and granddaughter of broadcaster Arthur Godfrey, she is married to her husband Rich of twenty years, and mother to their five children: Lolly, Ryan, Alexandra, Meghan and Matt. She is the founder of Washington based charities Labels for Love, and The District Sample Sale.
- Lynda Erkiletian, 52, originally from the south, she is the founder of D.C. based modeling agency T.H.E Artist Agency. Recently dating her partner Ebong, Lydia is the mother to her four kids, Aaron, Jessica, Mihran, and Sam from her previous marriage. A staple in Washington's social scene, she's involved in numerous charitable organizations.
- Cat Ommanney, 38, interior designer and writer originally from the United Kingdom; Cat moved to D.C. with her two daughters Jade and Ruby. She's writing her book, Inbox Full, with the photographic help from her husband, Charles, who's a photographer for the White House.
- Michaele Salahi, 44, Virginia native and self proclaimed former Washington Redskinette, she is married to her husband, Tareq; together they run his families winery, Oasis Winery. She's an advocate for Multiple sclerosis and the Leukemia & Lymphoma Society.
- Stacie Scott Turner, 43, real estate broker from Alexandria, Virginia, mother to her children, Jacob and Catherine, and wife to her husband, Jason. Also involved in philanthropic work, she is the founder of Extra-Ordinary Life, which caters to teenage girls in foster care.

== Episodes ==
Mary Amons, Lynda Erkiletian, Cat Ommanney, Michale Salahi and Stacie Scott Turner were introduced as series regulars.

No.	Title	Original release date	U.S. viewers (millions)
1	"Welcome to the District"	August 5, 2010	1.62
In the series premiere, Michaele hosts a polo event with some high members of society, including the Ambassador of India, Michelle Jones and Republican Lobbyist, Edwina Rogers. Lynda is reluctant to go due to old rivalries, Mary is tied up with the guest list for her birthday party and Cat gets a lesson in public relations at Stacie's dinner party.
2	"Disloyal to the Party"	August 12, 2010	1.39
Stacie tries to show the fellow housewives where she comes from but it takes an unexpected turn when her dinner is ruined by one of her guests. Lynda is pushed to her limit when a confrontation with Michaele breaks all the D.C. rules. Mary realized that having her daughter, Lolly, move back home comes with much bigger burdens than she had expected.
3	"Foreign Relations"	August 19, 2010	1.37
Michaele and Tareq decide to join Stacie and her husband in Europe, and the two couples start to create a bond. Cat is working hard on her book and creating her cover, when disappointment suddenly strikes. The housewives come together at Mary's fashion dinner to welcome a celebrity hairstylist, but previous drama comes into the light again and the night doesn't go as planned.
4	"The Grape Stomp of Wrath"	August 26, 2010	1.42
Cat feels that there's more than everyone else sees with Michaele and Tareq. Lynda handles with the stress of relocation from her Georgetown condo to a huge suburban mansion to fit the needs of her grown children. Michaele wants to make things right with the rest of the ladies, so she invites them over to her winery for a grape stomp session.
5	"Special Interests"	September 9, 2010	1.23
A peaceful day at the vineyard turns sour for Mary once Michaele and Tareq start to make devastating accusations about her daughter. The ladies are invited to an event hosted by Edwina Rogers, and Cat decides to spice the night up.
6	"Securing Homeland"	September 16, 2010	1.27
Michaele asks for Stacie's help in finding a home in D.C. Stacie is still in search of her biological father, while her mother is of no help. Cat and Mary bond over talks of motherhood. Cat loses a dear friend and is devastated by the loss, feeling alone while her husband is out of town. Tareq has family troubles yet again and Michaele realizes it's taking a toll on her.
7	"Perception Gap"	September 23, 2010	1.31
Cat finally puts the finishing touches on her book before sharing some of the juiciest bits with the rest of the housewives, all of which inspires Michaele and her husband to seek a lucrative Book with author Matt Carson who eventually backs away from the deal. During a fun night with the housewives and their families, an argument between Cat and Stacie's friend Erica breaks out and gets heated, bringing one of them to tears.
8	"Nation Building"	September 30, 2010	1.17
Michaele and Tareq Salahi attend the White House state dinner, which results in controversy for the couple. Stacie continues her search for her biological father. Lynda makes the final necessary preparations for debuting her fashion line.
9	"Party Politics"	October 7, 2010	1.42
In the season finale, Michaele and Tareq attend the State Dinner at the White House, and the ladies are forced to deal with the aftermath.
10	"Reunion: Part 1"	October 14, 2010	1.57
The ladies of D.C. reunite and tempers flare. Cat comes clean about her marriage problems. Lynda makes a shocking revelation about her habits. Stacie updates us on her situation with her birth father. The issue of race is discussed. The ladies doubt Michaele's claims that she has multiple sclerosis and that she was a Washington Redskins Cheerleader. Part 1 ends when Andy Cohen wants to bring out Tareq Salahi and housewife Lynda speaks up and says she will not allow it unless her boyfriend, Ebong, comes out as well.
11	"Reunion: Part 2"	October 21, 2010	1.67
The ladies of D.C. reunite in the second part of the reunion, and bring closure to the events that unraveled during the season.

== Production ==
The Real Housewives of D.C. was announced in May 2009 as the fifth installment of The Real Housewives franchise. In October, speculations regarding potential cast members such as Lisa Wernick Spies, and Lynda Erkiletian began circulating, however neither were confirmed by Bravo.

On November 26, 2009, The New York Times reported that prospective cast member for The Real Housewives of D.C. Michaele Salahi, along with her husband Tareq, had managed to penetrate the White House for President Barack Obama's first state dinner despite not appearing on the guest list. Bravo released a statement on behalf of Half Yard Productions (the show's production company) stating they were of the impression the Salahis had been invited to the dinner. Nonetheless, Bravo continued to declare Salahi had not been officially cast on the show.

In June 2010, Andy Cohen confirmed in a Huffington Post article that Bravo had in fact been filming Salahi, as well as other women, for months prior to the White House incident; confirming her casting. Subsequently, Mary Schmidt Amons, Lynda Erkiletian, Catherine Ommanney, and Stacie Scott Turner were announced as the official cast.

The season premiered on August 5, 2010 to an audience of 1.62 million, and maintained a viewership of 1.40 million throughout the 11 episode season.

On April 7, 2011, Bravo canceled The Real Housewives of D.C. It was the first time in the franchise that one of its United States installments failed to be renewed. Andy Cohen said the reason for the cancellation was due to "a stink" Michaele and Tareq Salahi left on the show, though he had wanted to bring back the remaining cast for a second season.

In 2015, the network announced a new version of The Real Housewives franchise based in the D.C. area, titled The Real Housewives of Potomac to distance itself from the failed effort.
