= Salahi, Razavi Khorasan =

Salahi صالحي
- Village
- Location within Iran
- Coordinates: 36°06′03″N 58°48′42″E
- Country: Iran
- Province: Razavi Khorasan
- County: Nishapur
- Bakhsh: Central
- Rural District: Mazul

Population (2006)
  - Total: 636
- Time zone: UTC+3:30 (IRST)
  - Summer (DST): UTC+4:30 (IRDT)

Salahi (Persian: صالحي, also Romanized as Sālaḥī; also known as Sālakī) is a village in Mazul Rural District, in the Central District of Nishapur County, Razavi Khorasan Province, Iran. At the 2006 census, its population was 636, in 156 families.
