= 2009 U.S. state dinner security breaches =

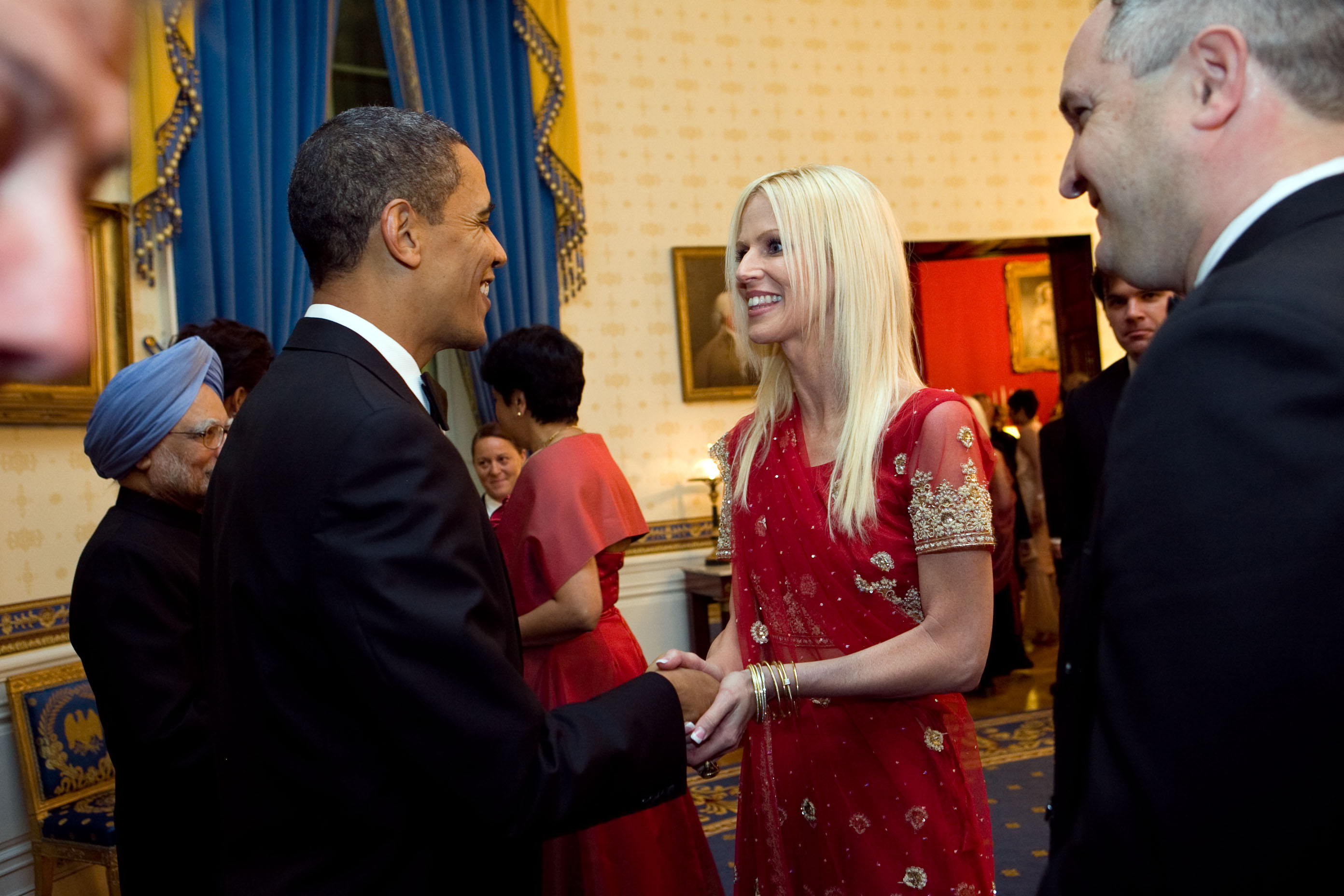
President Barack Obama greeting the Salahis in the Blue Room of the White House. Indian Prime Minister Manmohan Singh is behind President Obama in the blue turban.

On November 24, 2009, Michaele (/mɪˈkɛl/) and Tareq Salahi (/ˈtɑːrɛk sɑːˈlɑːhi/), a married couple from Virginia, and Carlos Allen (from the District of Columbia), attended a White House state dinner for Indian Prime Minister Manmohan Singh, as uninvited guests. The Salahis and Allen arrived separately and did not appear to have colluded in their efforts. They were able to pass through two security checkpoints (including one requiring positive photo identification), enter the White House complex, and meet President Barack Obama. The incident resulted in security investigations and legal inquiries.

== The incident ==
=== Motivation ===
At the time of the incident, Michaele Salahi was being filmed for Bravo's The Real Housewives of D.C. Camera crews for the show filmed the Salahis' preparation for the dinner, including Michaele's hair being done at a salon and her dress being properly styled, before going to the White House in a limousine with her husband Tareq. Cameras captured the couple being questioned at the gate by a person with a clipboard, who instructed them to proceed to the next gate when she could not verify them on her list. Sky News reported: "The Salahis hope to build a public profile in the US after appearing in the filming for the reality TV show The Real Housewives of Washington, D.C., though their contribution was never aired." The series began airing on Bravo in August 2010 and was later canceled due to the incident. Five years later, Bravo announced that the housewives were coming back to the Washington area, with The Real Housewives of Potomac airing in January 2016.

=== Preparation ===
Tim Burke, director of the gatecrashing reality show MTV Blaggers!, said that Tareq Salahi contacted him about a week before the White House incident for advice on tricking one's way into a black-tie event.

Michaele Salahi spent seven hours in the Erwin Gomez Salon in Georgetown to prepare for the state dinner, accompanied by a film crew from The Real Housewives. In contrast to the more sedate black or navy blue evening gowns worn by most female guests, Salahi wore a gold embroidered red ensemble, which the press widely referred to as a sari (more precisely, a lehenga-style sari and choli). Michaele was recorded on film saying that she had conferred with White House social secretary Desirée Rogers as to whether wearing this attire would be appropriate, and that "they thought the sari was a great idea." Aparajita Mukherjee of the Times of India later implied that Salahi probably bought the ensemble in the Janpath market of New Delhi during a July 2009 visit to invite the Indian polo team to participate in the 2010 America's Polo Cup. Michaele Salahi also wore expensive David Yurman jewelry to the event; reportedly, a Washington-area store lent her the bracelets and rings, in total worth $30,000, and needed three attempts to retrieve them. In February 2010, Salahi told an Australian television interviewer that her attire would be auctioned to raise funds for Haitian earthquake relief. It was sold at auction on October 2, 2010, for US$7,000 (equivalent to $10,335 in 2025).

=== Breach and attendance ===
The Salahis entered the state dinner in honor of India's Prime Minister Manmohan Singh without an invitation, although their film crew was unable to follow them. They passed through two security checkpoints, one of which checked them for photo identification. Robin Givhan of The Washington Post surmised that the Salahis were allowed to enter because they "looked the part" and, in her words, stepped through a "cultural blind spot." The Washington Post also quoted an anonymous official as having said that "the Salahis were allowed inside in violation of agency policies by an officer outside the front gate who apparently was persuaded by the couple's manner and insistence as well as the pressure of keeping lines moving on a rainy evening." The White House social secretary, Desirée Rogers, later told media that a member of her staff was at the main entrance to handle arriving guests not on the guest list, but that the Secret Service did not alert her staff to either the Salahis or Carlos Allen. The New York Times subsequently reported that Rogers had posted an employee of her office only at the East Portico checkpoint, but not at the first, outer checkpoint, a departure from past practice.

The Washington Post's Roxanne Roberts recognized the Salahis and subsequently wrote,

The minute I realized they were not on the list, I asked a White House staffer to verify their names and explain why they were not on the list. I told the same thing to another staffer a few minutes later. This was before the Salahis went through the receiving with the president, and they could have been pulled aside and quietly questioned.

Roberts' suspicions were apparently not acted upon; according to media reports, "the first the White House security detail knew of their blunder in allowing the Salahis into Tuesday's event was when the couple posted photographs from the dinner on their Facebook page." The White House on November 27 released its own photographs of the couple posing with President Obama, Vice President Joe Biden, and Chief of Staff Rahm Emanuel.

Invited guest Brian Williams, then-anchor of the NBC Nightly News who was there, observed the Salahis' sport utility vehicle being turned down from the East Gate entrance of the White House that evening, after which the Salahis and crew left their vehicle and walked toward the White House.

After returning from the White House, the Salahis posted their photographs from the dinner on Michaele's Facebook page.

== Aftermath ==
=== Formal investigation ===
On December 1, 2009, The Washington Post reported that the Secret Service found e-mail exchanges between the Salahis and Michele S. Jones, special assistant to the Secretary of Defense and the Pentagon-based liaison to the White House; Jones specifically told the Salahis not to come because she had no authority to grant admittance. That morning, the Salahis appeared on the Today show on NBC, interviewed by Matt Lauer. When Lauer asked the couple whether they were invited to the dinner, Michaele stated, "we were invited, not crashers and there isn't anyone that would have the audacity or the poor behavior to do that." Michaele also claimed victimization: "Everything we worked for, Matt—for me 44 years just destroyed." The Salahis also asserted that they had received no payment in return for granting the interview.

The Salahis were requested by the U.S. House of Representatives Homeland Security Committee to appear at a hearing on December 3, 2009, but they refused to attend. Following this, Representative Bennie Thompson, Democrat of Mississippi and chairman of the Committee, defeated Republican efforts to subpoena White House social secretary Desirée Rogers and to hold the Secret Service officially responsible for the Salahis' unauthorized entry. He also began a formal process to subpoena the Salahis. On December 9, 2009, the Committee on Homeland Security voted 26 to 3 to subpoena Tareq Salahi, and 27 to 2 to subpoena Michaele, for a hearing on the gatecrash that was scheduled for January 20, 2010.

The Salahis' attorney advised that the Salahis would invoke the Fifth Amendment to the United States Constitution, and they did so at the hearing, declining to answer questions 32 times. Despite this invocation of the Fifth Amendment, Tareq Salahi had informed the Las Vegas Sun that he and his wife "want the story of The White House cover-up about their invitation to be told." Tareq also told the Loudoun Times-Mirror prior to the hearings, "It will truly be a historic moment ... Not since the 1950s has Congress held hearings of such a historic nature." However, the Salahis' attorney, Stephen Best, described the Congressional inquest as "not a hearing looking for information. This was an opportunity for a public flogging."

White House Principal Deputy Counsel Daniel J. Meltzer stated in a letter on December 23, 2009, to the House of Representatives Committee on Homeland Security,

We have found no evidence the Salahis were included on any White House access list or guest list. The Salahis were not on the lists for the State Dinner, the Arrival Ceremony, or any other event scheduled for November 24. Indeed there is no record of the Salahis in the White House visitor access system since the beginning of the Obama Administration. Moreover, we have found no evidence that the Salahis called the White House and asked about the proper dress code for the State Dinner.

On January 8, 2010, media reported that a federal grand jury had been convened to investigate the apparent security breach by the Salahis. Erwin Gomez and Peggy Ioakim of the Erwin Gomez Salon and Spa were subpoenaed to testify before the grand jury. Politico reported that the subpoena does not mention the Salahis, but "says that the grand jury is investigating a possible violation of 18 USC 1001, a federal statute that covers lying to a government official." In addition, White House Usher Rear Admiral Stephen Rochon testified voluntarily to the grand jury, the first White House official to do so.

In an interview by Robin Roberts on ABC's Good Morning America television program broadcast January 10, 2010, Carlos Allen's attorney called Allen a "cooperating witness" and stated that Allen is not a subject of the grand jury investigation.

=== Reactions ===
Indian security officials expressed shock at the apparent breach of security. An anonymous Indian official told The Economic Times, part of the Times of India media group,

We are glad that it happened in the US. If such a security breach had happened out here in Hyderabad House, or even Vigyan Bhavan, we would have never heard the end of it and heads would have rolled. How such a breach in the most important official residence in the world happened is something all of us are very keen to know.

Secret Service Director Mark Sullivan issued a statement on November 27 saying that the Secret Service was "deeply concerned and embarrassed by the circumstances surrounding the State Dinner". Sullivan's statement also pointed out that "the preliminary findings of our internal investigation have determined established protocols were not followed at an initial checkpoint, verifying that two individuals were on the guest list." Newsweek magazine further reported, "The White House staff member whose job was to supervise the guest list for state dinners and clear invitees into the events says she was stripped of most of her responsibilities earlier this year, prompting her to resign last June."

Representative Peter T. King, Republican of New York, wrote a letter to the House Committee on Homeland Security requesting an investigation into this incident. The Secret Service also considered criminal charges against the Salahis.

Secret Service Director Sullivan put three identified employees on administrative leave. Sullivan testified at the December 3 hearing that the White House and Secret Service collaboratively planned security protocols for the state dinner.

In a televised interview on the CBS program 60 Minutes that aired December 13, 2009, President Obama termed the gatecrash a "screw-up", expressed anger that it had taken place, and vowed that such incidents would not occur again.

The incident also resulted in criticism of the White House for an alleged lack of transparency due to the Administration's unwillingness to allow the White House social secretary to testify before Congress.

Security was tightened both at the White House and at outside events involving the President, with one commentator referring to the new White House security regime as "so tight it operated like a beast on steroids." Congressman Louie Gohmert (R-Texas) complained in March 2010 about members of Congress having to walk a block in the rain to enter the White House:

The member of Congress, like today in the rain, has to go down a block and then go through security there with double the number of guards and then come up and go through security again and go through guards again ... not because Secret Service messed up or the armed guards that are now doubled in number, but because somebody in the White House staff screwed up ... Now they’re deciding to punish members of Congress and law-abiding citizens that normally just get in.

At the State of the Union address in the Capitol January 27, 2010, security was reportedly more stringent than before, with multiple checks of identification. An anonymous U.S. Senate official was quoted in The New York Times as saying,

Nobody, the Secret Service, the Capitol Police, wants another one of those ... They don’t want some chucklehead out on the House floor with a camera, then putting it on YouTube that he snuck in.

Security was also tightened for the May 19, 2010, state dinner in honor of Mexican President Felipe Calderón, to the extent that the wife of the Assistant Secretary of State for Western Hemisphere Affairs was turned away for lack of proper identification.

=== Repercussions for the Salahis ===
The widely publicized incident created a huge wave of interest in the personal lives and business dealings of Tareq and Michaele Salahi. Within days, their family winery was deluged with angry phone calls condemning their actions. Within a week of the incident, Tareq Salahi resigned from the Virginia Tourism Board at the request of Governor Tim Kaine, an Obama ally, and other state officials. Multiple sponsors withdrew support from the Salahis' "America's Polo Cup" event, although those withdrawals were not always acknowledged in the event's publicity materials.

By the end of December 2009, the Washington Post alone had assigned more than a dozen reporters to investigate them. By the end of June 2010, according to the Washington Post's ombudsman, the paper had extended its coverage of the couple to a new total of 110 articles by more than thirty reporters and contributors, ascribing its readers' interest to "the unique audaciousness and astonishing self-absorption of the Salahis." Tareq Salahi remarked in an interview that the White House should apologize for ruining his reputation and for the way he has been treated by the public and members of the media.

==== Loss of prestige ====
A USA Today/Gallup Poll conducted December 11–13, 2009, of 1,025 adults in the United States, revealed that 70% of respondents considered the Salahis "losers" politically as a result of their White House breach, versus 16% who considered them "winners". Of the 13 choices offered in the poll, the Salahis yielded the lowest score.

At a January 20, 2010, congressional hearing on the gatecrash, the Salahis were subjected to what The Washington Post called a "blistering bipartisan tongue-lashing."

=== Social criticism ===
Ellis Henican, a columnist for Newsday, called the Salahis "low-class, high-gloss wannabes", and said the matter amounted to "a new low" for reality television and the depths people will resort to for fame. The New York Daily News criticized Bravo for "settling for [the] bottom of [the] social ladder" in its casting policy for the Real Housewives program.

The New York Times characterized the gatecrash as a gross breach of social protocol in the nation's capital, thus:

... when Ms. Salahi strutted onto the South Lawn in that bright red lehenga, she and her husband breached far more than a secure perimeter.

They also trampled countless protocols that are the social, business and networking bedrock of official Washington. Essentially, the couple used the mixed martial arts approach to upward mobility in a town that still cherishes the Marquess of Queensberry rules.

However, Maureen Dowd, a New York Times columnist, used the incident to cast aspersions on Washington society, writing,

... even the outrage over the fakers is fake. The capital has turned up its nose at the tacky trompe-l'œil Virginia horse-country socialites: a faux Redskins cheerleader and a faux successful businessman auditioning for a “reality” show by feigning a White House invitation ... Yet Washington has always been a town full of poseurs, arrivistes, fame-seekers, cheaters and camera hogs.

=== Cultural references ===
An episode of Law & Order, titled "Crashers", was partially inspired by the incident.

The Salahi surname became a synonym of "gate crashing".

The phrase "Salahi route" has additionally been used to refer to refusal to pay for services rendered or goods delivered, as in

Some go the Salahi route, stiffing working folks on their bills (tradesmen, lawyers, beauty salon operators, purveyors of services), crashing parties.

In the opening segment of the December 5, 2009, episode of Saturday Night Live, Tareq was portrayed by Bobby Moynihan and Michaele by Kristen Wiig as interlopers who got on stage at a Barack Obama speech in Allentown, Pennsylvania, and posed for various pictures behind the President with Secret Service special agents and Vice President Joe Biden. At one point in the skit they ask the President to stop his speech and snap a group shot of all of them.

The monologue segment of the Late Show with David Letterman parodied the Salahis. NBC's Washington, D.C., affiliate posted on its website parody photographs of well-known American events into which images of the Salahis had been edited.

TV Squad listed this incident as one of the top four "reality scandals" of 2009. The Huffington Post ranked the incident fourth on its list of "Rubbernecking's Top Ten Pop Culture Moments of 2009". Addicting Games, a subsidiary of MTV Networks, created an online computer game, White House Party Crashers, in which the gamer is challenged, "Use your most devious skills to get past White House security."

Political satirist Dave Barry included the following mention of the incident in his summary of major "lowlights" of 2009:

... a Washington couple, Tareq and Michaele Salahi, penetrate heavy security and enter the White House, a feat that Joe Biden has yet to manage. As details of the incident emerge, an embarrassed Secret Service is forced to admit that not only did the couple crash a state dinner, but they also met and shook hands with the president, and they "may have served briefly in the Cabinet."

The Washington Post's "Reliable Source" gossip column chose Tareq and Michaele Salahi as its Persons of the Year for 2009, saying,

... the Salahis took what could have been an enjoyably seedy little horse-country melodrama and catapulted it into the gossip stratosphere with one fateful night at the White House that exposed the dark secrets of our decade's major growth industries: national security and reality television.

== See also ==
- White House intruders
- Michael Fagan incident
- 15 minutes of fame
- George H. W. Bush vomiting incident
