= Ken Cuccinelli as Attorney General of Virginia =

Ken Cuccinelli served as Attorney General of Virginia for one term during January 16, 2010 – January 11, 2014.

== 2009 election ==
In 2009, Cuccinelli was selected as the Republican nominee for attorney general, going on to win 58% of the vote (1,123,816 votes). Republican Bob McDonnell became governor, and Bill Bolling was re-elected as lieutenant governor. Cuccinelli was inaugurated as Attorney General of Virginia on January 16, 2010.

He donated $100,000 from his inauguration fundraising effort to a Richmond non-profit that provides medical and mental health services to the homeless, saying inauguration events should be used to shed light on impoverished and underserved citizens.

Two weeks after taking office, Cuccinelli drew questions for continuing to represent a private client in a court proceeding, although this was not illegal.

== Healthcare ==
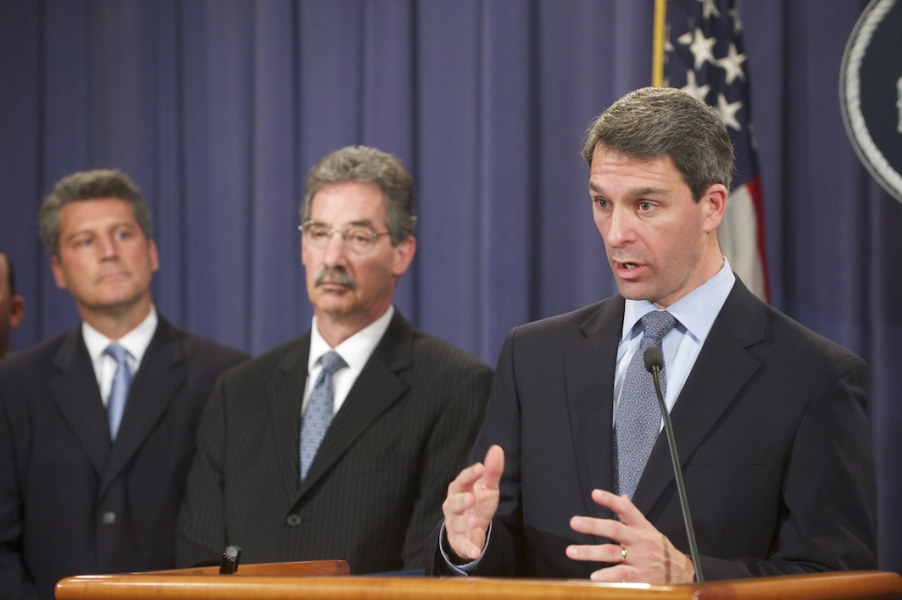
Cuccinelli (right) speaking at US Department of Justice announcement of resolution with Abbott Laboratories for its off-label promotion of the drug Depakote

In 2010, Cuccinelli filed a federal lawsuit (Virginia v. Sebelius) challenging the constitutionality of the Affordable Care Act (Obamacare), claiming that it exceeded the federal government's power under the interstate commerce clause of the Constitution. He was the first attorney general to file a lawsuit against the ACA. During his 2013 run for governor, Cuccinelli opposed the ACA's Medicaid expansion. The lawsuit was unsuccessful.

== Immigration ==
In July 2010, Cuccinelli joined eight other states in filing an amicus brief opposing the federal government's lawsuit challenging an Arizona immigration enforcement statute.

In August 2010, Cuccinelli issued a legal opinion authorizing law enforcement officials to investigate the immigration status of anyone that they have stopped; previously this was done only for those arrested. Cuccinelli noted that the authority to investigate the immigration status of a stopped person should not "extend the duration of a stop by any significant degree." Critics note that the opinion circumvents changing the policy by legislation and that bills to make this change have died in the General Assembly.

== Environment ==
Cuccinelli rejects the scientific consensus on climate change.

In 2010, Cuccinelli filed a request with the Environmental Protection Agency to reopen its proceeding regarding EPA's finding that greenhouse gasses endanger public health. He also sought judicial review of EPA's finding in Federal court. His press statement explained, "We cannot allow unelected bureaucrats with political agendas to use falsified data to regulate American industry and drive our economy into the ground". In 2012, a three-judge panel of the United States Court of Appeals for the District of Columbia Circuit rejected Cuccinelli's arguments, unanimously ruling in Coalition for Responsible Regulation v. U.S. Environmental Protection Agency that the EPA had the authority to regulate greenhouse gas emissions as part of a strategy to address anthropogenic climate change and that the EPA's finding that "greenhouse gases in the atmosphere may reasonably be anticipated both to endanger public health and to endanger public welfare" was well-founded in science and public policy.

In 2010, Cuccinelli announced he would challenge the March 2010 standards for motor vehicle fuel efficiency specified in the Clean Air Act.

=== Litigation against climate scientists ===
In April 2010, Cuccinelli served a civil investigative demand on the University of Virginia seeking a broad range of documents related to Michael E. Mann, a climate researcher now at Penn State who was an assistant professor at UVA from 1999 to 2005. Cuccinelli based his demand on the 2002 Virginia Fraud Against Taxpayers Act, although no evidence of wrongdoing was given to explain the invocation of the law. Following the Climatic Research Unit email controversy numerous accusations about Mann's work on climate reconstructions had been sent to the university, and investigations of these allegations by the U.S. National Academy of Sciences and Penn State subsequently cleared Mann of any wrongdoing. The Washington Post quoted Rachel Levinson, senior counsel with the American Association of University Professors (AAUP) as saying Cuccinelli's request had "echoes of McCarthyism." A. Barton Hinkle of the Richmond Times-Dispatch criticized Cuccinelli for "employing a very expansive reading of Virginia's Fraud Against Taxpayers Act."

Among the groups urging the University of Virginia to resist producing the data were: a letter published in Science signed by 255 members of the United States National Academy of Sciences, the American Civil Liberties Union and the AAUP. Also in May 2010, the University of Virginia Faculty Senate Executive Council wrote a letter strongly rebuking Cuccinelli for his civil investigative demand of the Mann records, stating that "[Cuccinelli's] action and the potential threat of legal prosecution of scientific endeavor that has satisfied peer-review standards send a chilling message to scientists engaged in basic research involving Earth's climate and indeed to scholars in any discipline." In 2011 in response to the escalating attacks from the Virginia AG's office, the Union of Concerned Scientists published a defense of scientific integrity titled "Timeline: Legal Harassment of Climate Scientist Michael Mann".

In May 2010, the University of Virginia began legal proceedings challenging Cuccinelli's investigative demand. The school's petition states that Virginia's "Fraud Against Taxpayers Act" (FATA) cited by Cuccinelli is not applicable in this case, as four of the five grants were federal, and that the fifth was an internal University of Virginia grant originally awarded in 2001. The filing also states that FATA was enacted in 2003 and is not retroactive.

In August 2010, Albemarle Circuit Court Judge Paul Peatross heard argument on when Cuccinelli should get the requested data. On August 30, 2010, Judge Paul M. Peatross Jr. said that "the nature of the conduct is not stated so that any reasonable person could glean what Dr. Mann did to violate the statute," the judge wrote.

In September 2010, Cuccinelli sent a new civil subpoena to the University of Virginia renewing a demand for documents related to the work of Mann. Cuccinelli narrowed his request to documents related to a grant that funded research unrelated to climate reconstructions. The demand also sought emails between Mann and 39 other climate change scientists. Cuccinelli filed a notice of appeal of the case to the Virginia Supreme Court, which ruled that Cuccinelli did not have the authority to make these demands. The outcome was hailed as a victory for academic freedom.

== LGBT rights ==
Cuccinelli opposes homosexuality, describing homosexual acts as "against nature" and "harmful to society." Cuccinelli opposes same-sex marriage. He has argued against the constitutionality of same-sex marriages.

In 2010, Cuccinelli called on Virginia universities to remove "'sexual orientation,' 'gender identity,' 'gender expression,' or like classification, as a protected class within its nondiscrimination policy, absent specific authorization from the General Assembly." Virginia Democratic State Senator John Edwards said that Cuccinelli was "turning back the clock on civil rights in Virginia." The American Association of University Professors and the University of Virginia also criticized the opinion. Cuccinelli defended the legal opinion: "Our role isn't in the political arena on this subject. Our role is to give legal advice, to state what the law is." The Washington Post said previous attorneys general of both parties held that local governments could not enact nondiscrimination policies for the same reason that Cuccinelli cited. Republican Governor Bob McDonnell supported the legal reasoning in the opinion. However, he issued Executive Directive One to all state agency heads stating that he would not allow them to discriminate based on sexual orientation.

== Crime ==
=== Combating usury ===
Since 2007, the Virginia Attorney General's Office has negotiated settlements of almost $8 million representing refunds from eight auto-title lenders. The office filed a lawsuit on May 18, 2010 against CNC Financial Services, Inc., doing business as Cash-N-A-Flash, a Hampton-based auto "title lender," for charging interest rates of 300 percent or more on its loans. This rate is alleged to exceed the 12 percent limit in the Virginia's Consumer Finance Act. However, effective October 1, 2010, Virginia's interest rate limit increased to 264 percent.

The Attorney General's Office filed two separate lawsuits against two Virginia Beach-based mortgage modification companies for charging customers up to $1,200 in illegal advance fees in exchange for allegedly helping to prevent foreclosure.

=== Combating sex trafficking and sodomy ===
Cuccinelli has been a staunch advocate against human trafficking during his time in office, describing it as "one of the most egregious human rights violations". He has slammed popular media for portraying prostitution and other forms of selling sex as "just another career choice". While in the state Senate he created a plan, which he has implemented as attorney general, to crack down on trafficking on the state and served on the Senate Human Trafficking Commission. As attorney general, he has devoted full-time staff in the attorney general's office to prosecute human trafficking, and in May 2013 one of his assistant attorneys general was honored by the National Center for Missing and Exploited Children for breaking up and prosecuting a sex trafficking ring in Fairfax County. The advocacy group Polaris Project named Virginia one of the most improved states in cracking down on human trafficking in 2010 under Cuccinelli's leadership. He made human trafficking legislation his priority in his efforts during the 2013 General Assembly session, teaming up with Democratic and Republican lawmakers in support of three anti-human trafficking bills, all of which were passed and signed into law.

He defended the constitutionality of Virginia laws prohibiting sodomy. In March 2013, a panel of the U.S. Court of Appeals struck down Virginia's anti-sodomy law in a case involving William Scott MacDonald, a 47-year-old man who solicited, but did not receive, oral sex from a 17-year-old girl, finding it unconstitutional based on the Supreme Court's 2003 ruling in Lawrence v. Texas". On June 25, 2013, Cuccinelli filed an appeal with the U.S. Supreme Court, asking the Court to uphold the law, saying the appeals court ruling would release MacDonald from probation and "threatens to undo convictions of child predators that were obtained under this law after 2003." Although the statute purported to ban all acts of sodomy and made no mention of age, Cuccinelli said the law is important for prosecutors to be able to "obtain felony charges against adults who commit or solicit this sex act with minors," and noted that the law "is not – and cannot be – used against consenting adults acting in private." In October 2013, the U.S. Supreme Court denied Cuccinelli's appeal.

=== Antitrust enforcement ===
A $173 million settlement was reached with six international manufacturers of computer chips. The settlement resolved claims that the companies engaged in a price-fixing arrangement that cost government purchasers and consumers millions of dollars in overcharges for their chips. Cuccinelli and 32 other state attorneys general participated in the investigation and the settlement of a court case that was first filed in Court in 2006, before Cuccinelli took office.

=== Extradition of Jens Soering to Germany ===
Jens Soering, 43, the son of a German diplomat and former Jefferson scholar at the University of Virginia, was convicted in 1990 and sentenced to two life terms for the 1985 first-degree stabbing murders of his then-girlfriend's parents, Derek and Nancy Haysom, in their Bedford County home, and held at the Buckingham Correctional Center in Dillwyn, Virginia. Former Gov. Timothy Kaine, on the last day of his administration in January 2010, approved a request from the German government and asked the Justice Department to transfer Soering back to Germany to complete his sentence. Newly elected Gov. Bob McDonnell, along with Cuccinelli, adamantly opposed the transfer. McDonnell formally notified the Justice Department just three days after taking office that it was imperative that Soering serve his time in Virginia and not in Germany, where a US news report said that he could have applied for parole after two years, although parole is only applicable after a minimum 15 years according to the German penal code. On July 7, 2010, U.S. Attorney General Eric Holder announced that he would not consider transferring Soering to a prison in his home country without the state's "clear and unambiguous" consent.

=== Exoneration of Thomas Haynesworth ===
Cuccinelli was involved in advocating for the exoneration of Thomas Haynesworth, who had served 27 years in prison for rape until new evidence emerged. As attorney general, Cuccinelli argued in court for Haynesworth's exoneration and Cuccinelli hired Haynesworth to work in his office as a clerk. Haynesworth said Cuccinelli was "an extraordinary guy", having "put it on the line for me", and continues to work in Cuccinelli's office. George Mason University political scientist Mark Rozell said, "People perceive Cuccinelli as a hard-right figure on a number of issues. They don't tend to see him as having a soft side."

== Education policy ==
On November 24, 2010, Cuccinelli issued a legal opinion that police, school administrators, and teachers could search students' cell phones on the basis of reasonable suspicions in order to deter cyberbullying and "sexting". The ACLU and the Rutherford Institute said that Cuccinelli's opinion was in error, lacking a legal foundation.

On January 28, 2011, Cuccinelli issued a legal opinion saying that school systems could not charge students the $75 testing fee when students take Advance Placement (AP) tests. Typically, AP courses are offered to academically advanced high school students to teach college-level materials. At the end of the course, students take a nationally administered AP test, and can receive college credit if the test score meets a specified level. Cuccinelli said that public schools were required to provide a free education, so schools could not charge students taking the AP class the exam fee.

== Donor intent ==
In February 2012, Cuccinelli filed a brief in the case of seven Anglican parishes that had left the Episcopal Diocese of Virginia as part of the Anglican realignment, including The Falls Church and Truro Church. Cuccinelli took the side of the departing Anglican churches, arguing that they should be entitled to keep personal property amounting to several million dollars that was donated to the parishes between 2003 and 2007 and marked by the donors as for the use of parishes only, not for the diocese. Cuccinelli made this argument on "donor intent" grounds. "That donor intent is paramount," Cuccinelli argued, "and governs the disposition of property, both real and personal, by one entrusted with its management, is a principle beyond dispute and interwoven throughout the law governing charitable trusts." The Fairfax County Circuit Court should not rule, Cuccinelli concluded, "in violation of the clearly expressed intent of the donors."

The court sided with the diocese, ruling that the properties must be handed over.

== Virginia seal ==
In May 2010, Cuccinelli used a historical state seal which shows Virtus, the Roman goddess of bravery and military strength, carrying a breastplate to cover her left breast on lapel pins he provided as gifts to his office staff. The current official seal shows Virtus holding a spear and her left breast is exposed. The original state seal was designed by George Wythe, a signer of the Declaration of Independence, and adopted in 1776. Cuccinelli's spokesman, Brian Gottstein, said lapel pins with the breast covered were paid for by Cuccinelli's political action committee, not with taxpayer funds.

In response to media inquiries, Cuccinelli released a statement including the following explanation:

The seal on my pin is one of many seal variations that were used before a uniform version was created in 1930. I felt it was historic and would be something unique for my staff. My joke about Virtue being a little more virtuous in her more modest clothing was intended to get laughs from my employees – which it did!

== Advocacy for veterans ==
In 2010, Cuccinelli announced plans to introduce a new level of veterans advocacy to the Attorney General's office, including training state agencies how to use the law to better advocate for their clients when it comes to obtaining federal veterans benefits. Cuccinelli said that one of the most important things he could do for veterans was to help speed up the process for them to obtain the services they are eligible for from the U.S. Department of Veterans Affairs. Other priority issues include ensuring that veterans have opportunities to become and stay employed in Virginia and working with the Virginia judiciary to determine how best to educate judges on how posttraumatic stress disorder and traumatic brain injury issues affect veterans.

== Ethics ==
=== Campaign contributions ===
Cuccinelli received $55,500 in campaign contributions from Bobby Thompson, a director of the U.S. Navy Veterans Association. The group was later found to be a racket. Thompson was Cuccinelli's second-largest campaign donor. After receiving the contribution, Cuccinelli met with Samuel F. Wright, a USNVA representative on February 15, 2010, to discuss legislation which had passed the State Senate that would exempt the group from having to register with Virginia regulators.

After an investigative report in the St. Petersburg Times in March 2010 raised questions about the Navy Veterans Association and Thompson, all other Virginia politicians, including Gov. Bob McDonnell, donated contributions from Thompson to other veterans' organizations. Cuccinelli refused to do so, despite calls from Virginia Democrats. Cuccinelli's spokesman said "if Mr. Thompson was convicted of wrongdoing relative to the misappropriation of funds, and contributions to our campaign came from money that was supposed to go to active duty military or veterans, we would donate those contributions to military support organizations here in Virginia." Sen. Don McEachin asserted that the standard for donations should be "much higher than that." A month later in June, a Cuccinelli spokesman said $55,500 would be set aside in a restricted account pending the outcome of the investigation into Thompson and USNVA. On July 28, 2010, Cuccinelli announced that he would donate the $55,000 to veterans' charities in Virginia. Cuccinelli stated that his decision was prompted by statements from Thompson's lawyers indicating that Thompson could no longer be located.

=== Star Scientific tax dispute lawsuit ===
In March 2013, Cuccinelli's role in a tax dispute case came into question when media reported on a lawsuit between the state of Virginia and Star Scientific, a nutritional supplements company. The Washington Post reported that Cuccinelli had failed to disclose investments in Star Scientific for a year; after realizing the oversight, he corrected it and disclosed the holdings. Cuccinelli has disclosed $18,000 in gifts from Star Scientific's chief executive, Jonnie R. Williams. He said he could not return them because they were dinners, vacations, and flights; things that could not be returned. He has sold his stock in the company.

The Washington Post found no evidence that Cuccinelli sought to personally intervene in the lawsuit. In April 2013, Cuccinelli recused himself from the case, hiring private attorneys to defend the state. Cuccinelli subsequently announced that he had discovered the equivalent of $4,500 in additional gifts from Jonnie R. Williams that he had not previously disclosed, including free use of Williams' Smith Mountain Lake vacation lodge in 2010 and 2012. In response, Cuccinelli asked the Commonwealth's attorney to review his disclosure filings. On July 18, 2013, a state prosecutor announced that he had found no evidence that Cuccinelli had violated the law, saying Cuccinelli did not appear to be attempting to conceal the relationship with Williams and he did not intentionally mischaracterize any gifts.

After Bob McDonnell's ties to Williams came under investigation, Cuccinelli urged McDonnell to call a special session of the General Assembly to re-examine disclosure and campaign finance laws. McDonnell, who as governor has the exclusive power to call a special session, declined Cuccinelli's request.

In September 2013, Cuccinelli donated, from his personal money, an amount equivalent to the value of the gifts he received from Williams to charity.
