= Capitol Polo Club =

Polo club in Poolesville, Maryland, US

The Capitol Polo Club is a polo club in Poolesville, Maryland.

== Location ==
The club is located at 14460 Hughes Road in Poolesville, Maryland, thirty miles northwest of Washington, D.C.

== History ==
The club was founded in 2006. It holds the Green Polo Cup, an annual charity tournament. According to its website, its aim is to "protect[ing] the environment and fight climate change." In 2009, proceeds went to American Council on Renewable Energy (ACORE), Equestrian Partners in Conservation (EPIC) and EarthEcho International. It has also benefited KIDSAVE, a non-profit organization.

The President of the club is Dr. Robert T. Do, Chairman of the Solena Group.
