= Salahi, Khuzestan =

Salahi صالحي
- Village
- Country: Iran
- Province: Khuzestan
- County: Bagh-e Malek
- Bakhsh: Meydavud
- Rural District: Meydavud

Population (2006)
  - Total: 406
- Time zone: UTC+3:30 (IRST)
  - Summer (DST): UTC+4:30 (IRDT)

Salahi (Persian: صالحي, also Romanized as Şālaḥī) is a village in Meydavud Rural District, Meydavud District, Bagh-e Malek County, Khuzestan Province, Iran. At the 2006 census, its population was 406, in 85 families.
