= Michaele Salahi =

American television personality

Michaele Ann Schon
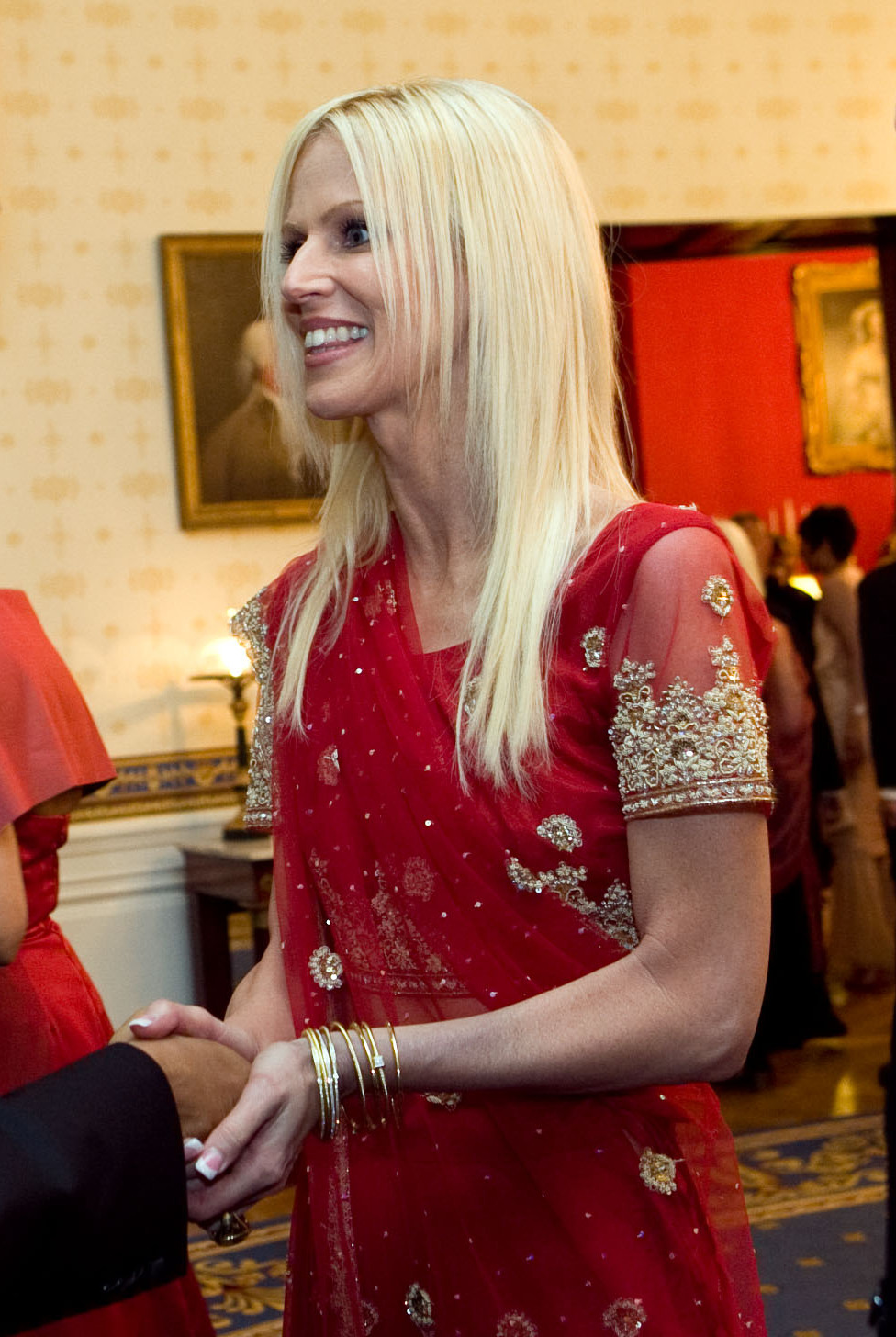
- Salahi in the White House in 2009
- Born: Michaele Ann Holt; October 1, 1965 (age 59)
- Occupation: Television personality
- Known for: 2009 U.S. state dinner security breaches
- Spouses: Tareq Salahi (m. 2003; div. 2012) Neal Schon (m. 2013)

Michaele Ann Schon (born Michaele Ann Holt; born October 1, 1965), formerly Michaele Salahi, is an American television personality and model. In 2010, she was a cast member on the reality show The Real Housewives of D.C. She and her then-husband, Tareq Salahi, gained national attention in November 2009 by breaching security to attend a White House state dinner in honor of India's Prime Minister Manmohan Singh.

== Early life and education ==
Schon was born October 1, 1965, the daughter of Howard A. Holt Jr. and Rosemary (née O'Malley) of Fairfax, Virginia. She has three siblings, a sister Debbie, and two brothers, Howard III and Glen. She attended, but did not graduate from, King's College in Wilkes-Barre, Pennsylvania.

In 2000, Michaele met Tareq Salahi at a baby shower, and they married three years later, in 2003, in a ceremony at Cathedral of St. Matthew in Washington, D.C. The guest list included 1,836 guests, including Supreme Court Justice Anthony Kennedy and former U.S. Ambassador to Ireland Margaret Heckler. The wedding, originally scheduled for October 2002, was postponed several times, prompting Kennedy to quip that he needed to issue "subpoenas" to the bride and groom.

== Career ==
Schon was a front-desk employee at contemporary hit radio station WKRZ in Freeland, Pennsylvania, in 1989. She then moved to the Washington metropolitan area, where she worked at the make-up counter at Nordstrom in Tysons Corner Center in McLean, Virginia, for most of the 1990s. In 2001, she was a make-up artist on the set of the "Lady Bird" episode of the PBS documentary series American Experience.

Schon has claimed to be a former Washington Redskins cheerleader; she has also claimed to have been featured in numerous television spots, was the face of Virginia.org's Wine Getaways ad campaign, and has also claimed to have been a featured model in various magazines. However, the Washington Redskins have publicly stated that she has never worked for them. She performed with the Redskins cheerleaders during a game in 2009, although other cheerleaders questioned her dancing abilities.

In Florida, a polo magazine editor stated the Salahis submitted pictures for a December 2008 article that identified Schon, then Michaele Salahi, as a "former Miss USA." No record exists of her winning that beauty crown, pageant officials said. In 2010, Michaele was one of the featured housewives on Bravo's The Real Housewives of D.C. In May 2011, she released the pop single “Bump It!” online.

== 2009 White House state dinner security breach ==
In June 2005, while he was still a U.S. Senator, Barack Obama posed for a photo with the Salahis and the Black Eyed Peas at the 12th annual Rock the Vote Awards Dinner at the National Building Museum. The Salahis also breached the September 26, 2009, dinner for the Congressional Black Caucus, where the couple posed for photos with Star Jones and U.S. Representative Chuck Rangel, then were asked to leave by security. On the December 2, 2009, Today Show, they claimed they were given tickets to that event by the Gardner Law Group, but caucus spokeswoman Muriel Cooper refuted that claim.

"The first the White House security detail knew of their blunder in allowing them into [the November 24, 2009, state dinner] was when the couple posted photographs from the dinner on their Facebook page." Invited guest Brian Williams, anchor of the NBC Nightly News, observed the Salahis' SUV being turned away from the East Gate entrance. After that, he saw the Salahis and crew leave their vehicle and walk to the White House. They entered through two security checkpoints; only one of them checked for photo ID. The White House on November 27 released photos of the couple posing with President Obama, Vice President Joe Biden, Chief of Staff Rahm Emanuel, and other celebrities in attendance.

On November 27, 2009, Secret Service director Mark J. Sullivan issued a statement, saying that the Secret Service was "deeply concerned and embarrassed by the circumstances surrounding the State Dinner". Sullivan's statement also pointed out that "the preliminary findings of our internal investigation have determined established protocols were not followed at an initial checkpoint, verifying that two individuals were on the guest list."

Representative Peter King, a Republican of New York, wrote a letter to the United States House Committee on Homeland Security requesting an investigation into the incident. The Secret Service also considered criminal charges against the Salahis. Michaele Salahi was requested by the committee to appear at a hearing on December 3, 2009, but she refused to attend.

== Divorce, engagement and marriage to Neal Schon ==
In September 2011, a missing-persons report for Michaele was filed by her then-husband, Tareq Salahi, and she was later was discovered to have run off with Neal Schon, a co-founder and the lead guitarist of the rock band Journey, whom she had met earlier. The couple divorced on August 20, 2012.

On October 14, 2012, Schon proposed to Michaele onstage during a charity concert at the Lyric Opera House in Baltimore, Maryland, offering her an oval 11.42 carat diamond engagement ring. The marriage was Michaele's second and Schon's fifth.

The couple married on December 15, 2013, in a pay-per-view ($14.95 for three hours) wedding that was broadcast live from the Palace of Fine Arts in San Francisco. On December 1, 2015, the San Francisco Board of Supervisors agreed to a settlement that would pay Neal and Michaele $290,000 in response to a lawsuit that had accused the city-county government of improperly permitting the wedding's organizers to increase their fees after learning of the pay-per-view arrangements.

== In popular culture ==
In the opening segment of the December 5, 2009, episode of Saturday Night Live, Kristen Wiig portrayed Michaele as an interloper who got on stage at a Barack Obama speech in Allentown, Pennsylvania, and posed for various pictures behind the President with her husband, Secret Service agents, and Vice President Joe Biden. At one point, they asked the President to stop his speech and snap a group shot of all of them.
