= List of Calgary Flames broadcasters =

This is a list of broadcasters for the Calgary Flames ice hockey team.

== Radio ==
Years	Flagship Station	Play-by-play	Colour commentators
1980–1981	CFAC	Bart Dailley	Doug Barkley
1981–2002	CFAC	Peter Maher	Doug Barkley
2002–2014	CFAC	Peter Maher	Mike Rogers
2014–2023	CFAC	Derek Wills	Peter Loubardias
2023–2026	CFAC	Derek Wills	Meaghan Mikkelson
2026–	CHQR	Derek Wills	Meaghan Mikkelson

=== Notes ===
- Peter Maher was the radio voice of the NHL's Calgary Flames from their move to Calgary, Alberta, Canada in 1980 until his retirement following the 2013-14 NHL season. He broadcast every Flames game for 33 years straight. He announced Flames games on the city's all-sports radio station, Sportsnet 960 The Fan. He was best known for bellowing "Yeah Baby!" after a significant or important moment, and "You can put it in the win column!" after every Flames win.
- Mike Rogers was the colour commentator for the Calgary Flames on Calgary radio stations for 12 years before announcing his retirement on July 25, 2013.

== Television ==
In 1981, the CFAC-TV moved to its new home, the Calgary Television Centre, a move reflecting its growth since its disaffiliation from the CBC. After obtaining the television rights to the (then-newly relocated) Calgary Flames National Hockey League franchise the year before, the station purchased a seven-camera mobile unit soon after. The station has been the Flames' television partner since 1980.

The Sportsnet One license is also used for a series of part-time multiplex channels which carry regional National Hockey League coverage, for selected Vancouver Canucks, Edmonton Oilers, and Calgary Flames games. The channels themselves are only carried within the respective teams' territories.

Years	Play-by-play	Colour commentators
1980–1986	Ed Whalen	
1986–1990	Ed Whalen	John Garrett (select games); Harry Neale (select games)
1990–1999	Ed Whalen	Jim Peplinski (select games); John Garrett (select games); Harry Neale (select games)
1999–2002	Grant Pollack	John Garrett
2002–2003	Bruce Buchanan	Ryan Walter and John Garrett
2003–2007	Roger Millions	Ryan Walter
2007–2008	Roger Millions	John Garrett
2007–2008	Roger Millions	Charlie Simmer (PPV)
2008–2011	Peter Loubardias	John Garrett
2008–2011	Peter Loubardias	Charlie Simmer (PPV)
2011–2014	Rob Kerr	Charlie Simmer
2014–2021	Rick Ball	Kelly Hrudey (primary); Cassie Campbell-Pascall (during Hrudey's Hockey Night in Canada assignments)
2021–2024	Rick Ball	Kelly Hrudey (primary); Cassie Campbell-Pascall (during Hrudey's Hockey Night in Canada assignments); Greg Millen (during Hrudey's Hockey Night in Canada and Campbell-Pascall's NHL on ESPN assignments)
2024–2025	Jon Abbott	Kelly Hrudey (primary); Greg Millen (during Hrudey's Hockey Night in Canada assignments)
2025-26	Jon Abbott	Kelly Hrudey (primary); Jason York (during Hrudey's Hockey Night in Canada assignments)
2026–27	Jon Abbott	Kevin Sawyer

=== Notes ===
- Peter Loubardias worked for Rogers Sportsnet as a play-by-play commentator for the Calgary Flames from 2008-2011, as well as numerous Memorial Cup tournaments.
- With Rogers Media, the parent company of Sportsnet, gaining the sole national rights to the NHL beginning in the 2014-15 season, in August 2014, Kelly Hrudey joined Sportsnet full time to participate in their hockey coverage. In addition to his Hockey Night in Canada role (which remains on CBC as part of a four year sub-licensing deal), he along with Rick Ball became the new announcers for the Calgary Flames regional broadcasts.
- On November 26, 2013, after Rogers Communications secured a $5.2 billion deal with the National Hockey League for 12 years, Cassie Campbell then joined Sportsnet's broadcast team to back-up Kelly Hrudey, in addition to her Hockey Night in Canada role.

== See also ==
- List of current National Hockey League broadcasters
- Historical NHL over-the-air television broadcasters
- Atlanta_Flames#Broadcasters
