= List of Vancouver Canucks broadcasters =

The following is a season-by-season list of people who have worked on Vancouver Canucks local radio and television broadcasts.

Key: * - Simulcast on both television and radio

== Television ==
=== 2020s ===
Year	Channel	Play-by-play	Color commentator(s)	Rinkside reporter	Studio host
2026–27	SN Pacific	John Shorthouse	Dave Tomlinson (primary); Ray Ferraro (select games)	Dan Murphy	Dan Murphy
2025–26	SN Pacific	John Shorthouse	Dave Tomlinson (primary); Ray Ferraro (select games)	Dan Murphy	Dan Murphy
2024–25	SN Pacific	John Shorthouse	Dave Tomlinson (primary); Ray Ferraro (select games)	Dan Murphy	Dan Murphy
2024–25	SN Canucks	John Shorthouse	Dave Tomlinson (primary); Ray Ferraro (select games)	Dan Murphy	Dan Murphy
2023–24	SN Pacific	John Shorthouse	Dave Tomlinson (primary); Ray Ferraro (select games)	Dan Murphy	Dan Murphy
2023–24	SN Canucks	John Shorthouse	Dave Tomlinson (primary); Ray Ferraro (select games)	Dan Murphy	Dan Murphy
2022–23	SN Pacific	John Shorthouse	John Garrett	Dan Murphy	Dan Murphy
2022–23	SN Canucks	John Shorthouse	John Garrett	Dan Murphy	Dan Murphy
2021–22	SN Pacific	John Shorthouse	John Garrett (primary); Corey Hirsch (select games)	Dan Murphy	Dan Murphy
2021–22	SN Canucks	John Shorthouse	John Garrett (primary); Corey Hirsch (select games)	Dan Murphy	Dan Murphy
2020–21	SN Pacific	John Shorthouse	John Garrett (primary); Corey Hirsch (select games)	Dan Murphy (home games; road games supplied by home team broadcast)	Dan Murphy
2020–21	SN Canucks	John Shorthouse	John Garrett (primary); Corey Hirsch (select games)	Dan Murphy (home games; road games supplied by home team broadcast)	Dan Murphy

=== 2010s ===
Year	Channel	Play-by-play	Color commentator	Rinkside reporter	Studio host
2019–20	SN Pacific	John Shorthouse	John Garrett	Joey Kenward (home games); Dan Murphy (road games)	Dan Murphy
2019–20	SN Canucks	John Shorthouse	John Garrett	Joey Kenward (home games); Dan Murphy (road games)	Dan Murphy
2018–19	SN Pacific	John Shorthouse	John Garrett	Joey Kenward (home games); Dan Murphy (road games)	Dan Murphy
2018–19	SN Canucks	John Shorthouse	John Garrett	Joey Kenward (home games); Dan Murphy (road games)	Dan Murphy
2017–18	SN Pacific	John Shorthouse	John Garrett	Joey Kenward (home games); Dan Murphy (road games)	Dan Murphy
2017–18	SN Canucks	John Shorthouse	John Garrett	Joey Kenward (home games); Dan Murphy (road games)	Dan Murphy
2016–17	SN Pacific	John Shorthouse	John Garrett	Joey Kenward (home games); Dan Murphy (road games)	Dan Murphy
2016–17	SN Canucks	John Shorthouse	John Garrett	Joey Kenward (home games); Dan Murphy (road games)	Dan Murphy
2015–16	SN Pacific	John Shorthouse	John Garrett	Joey Kenward (home games); Dan Murphy (road games)	Dan Murphy
2015–16	SN Canucks	John Shorthouse	John Garrett	Joey Kenward (home games); Dan Murphy (road games)	Dan Murphy
2014–15	SN Pacific	John Shorthouse	John Garrett	Joey Kenward (home games); Dan Murphy (road games)	Dan Murphy
2014–15	SN Canucks	John Shorthouse	John Garrett	Joey Kenward (home games); Dan Murphy (road games)	Dan Murphy
2013–14	SN Pacific	John Shorthouse	John Garrett	Joey Kenward (home games); Dan Murphy (road games)	Dan Murphy
2013–14	SN Vancouver Hockey (SN One)	John Shorthouse	John Garrett	Joey Kenward (home games); Dan Murphy (road games)	Dan Murphy
2012–13	SN Pacific	John Shorthouse	John Garrett	Joey Kenward (home games); Dan Murphy (road games)	Dan Murphy
2012–13	SN Vancouver Hockey (SN One)	John Shorthouse	John Garrett	Joey Kenward (home games); Dan Murphy (road games)	Dan Murphy
2011–12	SN Pacific	John Shorthouse	John Garrett	Joey Kenward (home games); Dan Murphy (road games)	Dan Murphy
2011–12	SN Vancouver Hockey (SN One)	John Shorthouse	John Garrett	Joey Kenward (home games); Dan Murphy (road games)	Dan Murphy
2010–11	RSN Pacific	John Shorthouse	John Garrett	Joey Kenward (home games); Dan Murphy (road games)	Dan Murphy
2010–11	RSN Vancouver Hockey (RSN One)	John Shorthouse	John Garrett	Joey Kenward (home games); Dan Murphy (road games)	Dan Murphy

=== 2000s ===
Year	Channel	Play-by-play	Color commentator	Rinkside reporter	Studio host	Studio analyst(s)
2009–10	RSN Pacific	John Shorthouse	John Garrett		Dan Murphy	
2009–10	Canucks TV	John Shorthouse	John Garrett	Ray Ferraro	Dan Murphy	Ray Ferraro
2008–09	RSN Pacific	John Shorthouse	John Garrett		Dan Murphy	
2008–09	Canucks TV	John Shorthouse*	Tom Larscheid*	Craig McEwen	Dan Murphy	Garry Valk and Kirk McLean
2007–08	RSN Pacific	Jim Hughson	John Garrett		Dan Murphy	
2007–08	Canucks TV	John Shorthouse*	Tom Larscheid*	Craig McEwen	Dan Murphy	Ryan Walter and Kirk McLean
2006–07	RSN Pacific	Jim Hughson	John Garrett		Dan Murphy	
2006–07	Canucks TV	John Shorthouse*	Tom Larscheid*	Craig McEwen	Dan Murphy	Ryan Walter and Kirk McLean
2005–06	RSN Pacific	Jim Hughson	John Garrett		Dan Murphy	
2005–06	Canucks TV	John Shorthouse*	Tom Larscheid*	Craig McEwen	Dan Murphy	Ryan Walter and Kirk McLean
2003–04	RSN Pacific	Jim Hughson	John Garrett		Dan Murphy	
2003–04	Canucks TV	John Shorthouse*	Tom Larscheid*	Craig McEwen	Dan Murphy	Ryan Walter and Kirk McLean
2002–03	RSN Pacific	Jim Hughson	John Garrett		Dan Murphy	
2002–03	Canucks TV	John Shorthouse*	Tom Larscheid*	Craig McEwen	Dan Murphy	Ryan Walter and Kirk McLean
2001–02	RSN Pacific	Jim Hughson	Ryan Walter		Dan Murphy	
2001–02	Canucks TV	John Shorthouse*	Tom Larscheid*	Craig McEwen	Dan Murphy	Ryan Walter and Kirk McLean
2000–01	CTV Sportsnet Pacific	Jim Hughson	Ryan Walter		Perry Solkowski	
2000–01	VTV	Jim Hughson or Rick Ball	Ryan Walter		Perry Solkowski	

=== 1990s ===
Year	Channel	Play-by-play	Color commentator(s)	Rinkside reporter	Studio host
1999–2000	CTVSN Pacific	Jim Hughson	Ryan Walter		Perry Solkowski
1999–2000	VTV	Jim Hughson or Kevin Quinn	Ryan Walter		Perry Solkowski
1998–99	CTVSN Pacific	John Shorthouse	Ryan Walter		Perry Solkowski
1998–99	VTV	Jim Robson	Ryan Walter		Perry Solkowski
1997–98	BCTV	Jim Robson	Ryan Walter		
1997–98	Canucks TV	Dan Russell	Ryan Walter	John Shorthouse	Chris Hebb
1996–97	BCTV	Jim Robson	Ryan Walter		
1996–97	Canucks TV	Dan Russell	Ryan Walter	John Shorthouse	Chris Hebb
1995–96	BCTV	Jim Robson	Darcy Rota		Squire Barnes
1994–95	BCTV	Jim Robson	Darcy Rota		Squire Barnes
1994–95	CHEK	Jim Robson	Darcy Rota		Squire Barnes
1993–94	BCTV	Jim Robson*	Tom Larscheid*		John McKeachie
1993–94	CHEK	Jim Robson*	Tom Larscheid*		John McKeachie
1992–93	BCTV	Jim Robson*	Tom Larscheid*		John McKeachie
1992–93	CHEK	Jim Robson*	Tom Larscheid*		John McKeachie
1991–92	BCTV	Jim Robson*	Tom Larscheid*		John McKeachie
1991–92	CHEK	Jim Robson*	Tom Larscheid*		John McKeachie
1990–91	BCTV	Jim Robson*	Tom Larscheid*		Dave Hodge
1990–91	CHEK	Jim Robson*	Tom Larscheid*		Dave Hodge

=== 1980s ===
Year	Channel	Play-by-play	Color commentator(s)	Studio host	Studio analyst
1989–90	BCTV	Jim Robson*	Tom Larscheid*	Barry Houlihan	Garry Monahan
1989–90	CHEK	Jim Robson*	Tom Larscheid*	Barry Houlihan	Garry Monahan
1988–89	BCTV	Jim Robson*	Tom Larscheid*	Barry Houlihan	Garry Monahan
1987–88	BCTV	Jim Robson*	Garry Monahan*	Barry Houlihan	
1986–87	No local television coverage				
1985–86	BCTV	Jim Robson	Howie Meeker	Barry Houlihan	
1984–85	BCTV	Bernie Pascall	Howie Meeker	Barry Houlihan	
1983–84	BCTV	Bernie Pascall	Howie Meeker	Barry Houlihan	
1982–83	BCTV	Bernie Pascall	Howie Meeker		
1981–82	BCTV	Bernie Pascall	Howie Meeker		
1980–81	BCTV	Bernie Pascall	Howie Meeker		

=== 1970s ===
Year	Channel	Play-by-play	Color commentator
1979–80	BCTV	Bernie Pascall	Howie Meeker
1978–79	BCTV	Bernie Pascall	Howie Meeker
1977–78	BCTV	Bernie Pascall	Howie Meeker
1976–77	BCTV	Bernie Pascall	Babe Pratt
1975–76	BCTV	Bernie Pascall	Babe Pratt
1974–75	BCTV	Bernie Pascall	Babe Pratt
1973–74	BCTV	Bernie Pascall	Babe Pratt
1972–73	BCTV	Bernie Pascall	Babe Pratt
1971–72	BCTV	Bernie Pascall	Babe Pratt
1970–71	BCTV	Bernie Pascall	Babe Pratt

== Radio ==
=== 2020s ===
Year	Flagship Station	Play-by-play	Color commentator	Studio host	Studio analyst(s)
2026–27	KiSS West Coast	Brendan Batchelor	Randip Janda	Arash Memarzadeh	Dominic Šramaty
2025–26	Sportsnet 650	Brendan Batchelor	Randip Janda (primary); Dan Riccio (select games); Brett Festerling (select games) Landon Ferraro (select games)	Satiar Shah	Alex Auld Bik Nizzar
2024–25	Sportsnet 650	Brendan Batchelor	Randip Janda (primary); Dan Riccio (select games); Brett Festerling (select games) Landon Ferraro (select games)	Satiar Shah	Alex Auld Bik Nizzar
2023–24	Sportsnet 650	Brendan Batchelor	Randip Janda (primary); Dan Riccio (select games); Brett Festerling (select games) Landon Ferraro (select games)	Satiar Shah	Alex Auld Bik Nizzar
2022–23	Sportsnet 650	Brendan Batchelor	Randip Janda (primary); Dan Riccio (select games); Brett Festerling (select games) Landon Ferraro (select games)	Satiar Shah	Alex Auld Bik Nizzar
2021–22	Sportsnet 650	Brendan Batchelor	Randip Janda (primary); Dan Riccio (select games); Brett Festerling (select games) Landon Ferraro (select games)	Satiar Shah	Alex Auld Bik Nizzar
2020–21	Sportsnet 650	Brendan Batchelor	Randip Janda (primary); Dan Riccio (select games); Brett Festerling (select games) Landon Ferraro (select games)	Satiar Shah	Alex Auld Bik Nizzar

=== 2010s ===
Year	Flagship Station	Play-by-play	Color commentator	Studio host	Studio analyst(s)
2019–20	Sportsnet 650	Brendan Batchelor	Corey Hirsch	Satiar Shah	Alex Auld
2018–19	Sportsnet 650	Brendan Batchelor	Corey Hirsch	Joey Kenward	Alex Auld
2017–18	Sportsnet 650	Brendan Batchelor	Corey Hirsch	Joey Kenward	Alex Auld
2016–17	TSN 1040	John Shorthouse (national TV games); Jon Abbott (select non-nationally televised games)	Dave Tomlinson	Blake Price	Alex Auld
2015–16	TSN 1040	John Shorthouse (national TV games); Jon Abbott (select non-nationally televised games)	Dave Tomlinson	Blake Price	Alex Auld
2014–15	TSN 1040	John Shorthouse (national TV games); Jon Abbott (select non-nationally televised games)	Dave Tomlinson	Blake Price	Alex Auld
2013–14	Team 1040	John Shorthouse (national TV games); Rick Ball (select non-nationally televised games); Joey Kenward (select non-nationally televised games)	Dave Tomlinson	Blake Price	Alex Auld
2012–13	Team 1040	John Shorthouse (national TV games); Rick Ball (select non-nationally televised games); Joey Kenward (select non-nationally televised games)	Dave Tomlinson	Blake Price	Alex Auld
2011–12	Team 1040	John Shorthouse (national TV games); Rick Ball (select non-nationally televised games); Joey Kenward (select non-nationally televised games)	Dave Tomlinson	Blake Price	Alex Auld
2010–11	Team 1040	John Shorthouse (national TV games); Rick Ball (select non-nationally televised games); Joey Kenward (select non-nationally televised games)	Dave Tomlinson	Blake Price	Alex Auld

=== 2000s ===
Year	Flagship Station	Play-by-play	Color commentator	Studio host	Studio analyst(s)
2009–10	Team 1040	John Shorthouse (national TV games); Rick Ball (select non-nationally televised games); Joey Kenward (select non-nationally televised games)	Tom Larscheid	Blake Price	Dave Tomlinson
2008–09	Team 1040	John Shorthouse (national TV games); Rick Ball (select non-nationally televised games); Joey Kenward (select non-nationally televised games)	Tom Larscheid	Blake Price	Dave Tomlinson
2007–08	Team 1040	John Shorthouse	Tom Larscheid	Blake Price	Dave Tomlinson
2006–07	Team 1040	John Shorthouse	Tom Larscheid	Brook Ward or Jeff Paterson	Dave Tomlinson
2005–06	CKNW	John Shorthouse	Tom Larscheid	Dan Russell or Jeff Paterson	
2003–04	CKNW	John Shorthouse	Tom Larscheid	Dan Russell or Jeff Paterson	
2002–03	CKNW	John Shorthouse	Tom Larscheid	Dan Russell or Jeff Paterson	
2001–02	CKNW	John Shorthouse	Tom Larscheid	Dan Russell or Jeff Paterson	
2000–01	CKNW	John Shorthouse	Tom Larscheid	Dan Russell or Jeff Paterson	

=== 1990s ===
Year	Flagship Station	Play-by-play	Color commentator	Studio host	Studio analyst(s)
1999–2000	CKNW	John Shorthouse	Tom Larscheid	Don Taylor	
1998–99	CKNW	Jim Hughson or John Shorthouse	Tom Larscheid	John McKeachie or John Shorthouse	
1997–98	CKNW	Jim Hughson	Tom Larscheid	Dave Randorf	
1996–97	CKNW	Jim Hughson	Tom Larscheid	Dave Randorf	
1995–96	CKNW	Jim Hughson	Tom Larscheid	Dave Randorf	Ryan Walter
1994–95	CKNW	Jim Hughson	Tom Larscheid	Lee Powell	Ryan Walter
1993–94	CKNW	Jim Robson	Tom Larscheid	Lee Powell	Ryan Walter
1992–93	CKNW	Jim Robson	Tom Larscheid	Lee Powell	Garry Monahan
1991–92	CKNW	Jim Robson	Tom Larscheid	Lee Powell	Garry Monahan
1990–91	CKNW	Jim Robson	Tom Larscheid	Lee Powell	Garry Monahan

=== 1980s ===
Year	Flagship Station	Play-by-play	Color commentator	Studio host	Rinkside reporter
1989–90	CKNW	Jim Robson	Tom Larscheid	Dave Hodge	Garry Monahan
1988–89	CKNW	Jim Robson	Tom Larscheid	Dave Hodge	Garry Monahan
1987–88	CKNW	Jim Robson	Garry Monahan	Dave Hodge	
1986–87	CKNW	Jim Robson	Garry Monahan	Dave Hodge or Al Davidson	
1985–86	CKNW	Jim Robson or Ron Barnett	Garry Monahan	Al Davidson	
1984–85	CKNW	Jim Robson or Ron Barnett	Garry Monahan	Al Davidson	
1983–84	CKNW	Jim Robson or Ron Barnett	Garry Monahan	Al Davidson	
1982–83	CKNW	Jim Robson or Ron Barnett	Tom Larscheid	Al Davidson	
1981–82	CKNW	Jim Robson or Jim Hughson	Tom Larscheid	Al Davidson	Jim Hughson
1980–81	CKNW	Jim Robson or Jim Hughson	Tom Larscheid	Al Davidson	Jim Hughson

=== 1970s ===
Year	Flagship Station	Play-by-play	Color commentator	Rinkside reporter	Studio host
1979–80	CKNW	Jim Robson	Tom Larscheid	Al Davidson	Jim Hughson
1978–79	CKNW	Jim Robson	Tom Larscheid	Al Davidson	
1977–78	CKNW	Jim Robson	Tom Larscheid	Al Davidson	
1976–77	CKNW	Jim Robson		Al Davidson	
1975–76	CKNW	Jim Robson		Al Davidson	
1974–75	CKNW	Jim Robson		Al Davidson	
1973–74	CKNW	Jim Robson		Al Davidson	
1972–73	CKNW	Jim Robson		Al Davidson	
1971–72	CKNW	Jim Robson		Al Davidson	
1970–71	CKNW	Jim Robson		Al Davidson	

== See also ==
- List of current National Hockey League broadcasters
