= Greg Millen =

Canadian ice hockey player (1957–2025)

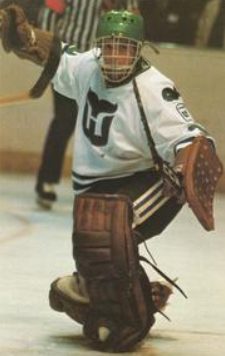
- Millen in 1982 card
- Born: June 25, 1957 Toronto, Ontario, Canada
- Died: April 7, 2025 (aged 67) Bracebridge, Ontario, Canada
- Height: 5 ft 9 in (175 cm)
- Weight: 175 lb (79 kg; 12 st 7 lb)
- Position: Goaltender
- Caught: Right
- Played for: Pittsburgh Penguins; Hartford Whalers; St. Louis Blues; Quebec Nordiques; Chicago Blackhawks; Detroit Red Wings
- National team: Canada
- NHL draft: 102nd overall, 1977; Pittsburgh Penguins
- Playing career: 1978–1992
Medal record
Representing Canada
Ice hockey
World Championships
Bronze medal – third place	1982 Finland

Gregory H. Millen (June 25, 1957 – April 7, 2025) was a Canadian hockey commentator-analyst and professional ice hockey goaltender who played 14 seasons for six teams in the National Hockey League (NHL). During his career as a colour commentator, he worked on regional telecasts for the Ottawa Senators, Toronto Maple Leafs and Calgary Flames, and on national telecasts on Hockey Night in Canada and the NHL on Sportsnet.

== Playing career ==
As a youth, Millen played in the 1968, 1969 and 1970 Quebec International Pee-Wee Hockey Tournaments with minor ice hockey teams from Toronto.

=== Pittsburgh Penguins ===
The Toronto native was chosen 102nd overall by the Pittsburgh Penguins in the 1977 NHL Amateur Draft on June 14, 1977, while he was in the midst of a fine Ontario Hockey Association (OHA) season with the Sault Ste. Marie Greyhounds. He had played for the Peterborough Petes in the OHA from 1974 to 1977. In 1978–79, he looked solid in 28 games as a rookie and became a fan favourite at the Civic Arena in Pittsburgh. Two years later, Millen won 25 games and nearly led his team to a first-round upset over the St. Louis Blues, losing the decisive fifth game in double overtime.

In spite of his post-season heroics, the Penguins allowed Millen to leave the club that summer. On June 16, 1981, the Hartford Whalers signed him as a restricted free agent; the Penguins had the right to match the offer but their general manager, Baz Bastien, was on vacation and was unaware that Millen had signed, and as a result the deadline for the Penguins to match passed. In compensation, the Penguins received forwards Pat Boutette and Kevin McClelland on June 30, 1981.

=== Hartford Whalers ===
With the Whalers, Millen pushed incumbent starter John Garrett into the backup role and logged a heavy workload. After playing in 55 games for the Whalers in 1981–82, Millen represented Canada at the 1982 Ice Hockey World Championships.

During the 1982-83 season, Millen's first child was born at 2 am during a historic East Coast blizzard. After going to sleep at 3 am and waking up at 6 am, Millen and assistant Whalers general manager Bob Crocker drove through the blizzard to Long Island. Thinking he could not possibly get the start versus Mike Bossy's New York Islanders, Millen surprisingly got the call, won the game, and then traveled to Hartford to face the Toronto Maple Leafs the next night, on a back to back, where again he won. Millen credited this accomplishment as convincing him that goaltending is all mental.

In 1983–84, he led the NHL with 60 appearances, but he could not get the lowly Whalers into the post-season. During the 1984–85 season he was involved in a blockbuster trade on February 21, 1985, that sent him to the St. Louis Blues with Mark Johnson for goaltender Mike Liut and forward Jörgen Pettersson.

=== St. Louis Blues ===
In St. Louis, Millen formed a solid goalkeeping tandem with Rick Wamsley and helped the club reach the Conference Finals in 1986, where they were defeated in seven games by the Calgary Flames. During the Division Semifinal against the Minnesota North Stars, Millen started and won two games, including the series-clinching game 5. Then in the Division Final, St. Louis defeated the Toronto Maple Leafs 4 games to 3. He posted a record of 4–2 and once again was in net for the series clincher. He played in two of the Campbell Conference final games as Wamsley was the starter for the rest. Wamsley was traded to Calgary during the 1987–88 season, making Millen the undisputed starter in St. Louis and he enjoyed his best year with the club the following year. In 1988–89, Millen registered an NHL-high six shutouts along with 22 wins while making 52 starts, all highs for his Blues career.

The following year netminder Vincent Riendeau began taking a bigger share of the starts and with college free agent Curtis Joseph in the wings, Millen was being pushed out. On December 13, 1989, he was packaged with centre Tony Hrkac and traded to the lowly Quebec Nordiques in exchange for offensive defenceman Jeff Brown. Millen was shocked by the deal: "I was devastated. My family was just entrenched in St. Louis. We were involved with the community, and we really enjoyed St. Louis an awful lot."

=== Quebec Nordiques ===
With the Nordiques, Millen won only 3 of 18 starts while his goals against average ballooned to 5.28. Clearly unhappy and with the team in last place, Millen wanted out. He made it clear to the management that he had no intention of playing out his career in that kind of situation. In March, the Nordiques included him in a package that saw Hall of Fame winger Michel Goulet leave the Nordiques in a six-player trade with the Chicago Blackhawks on March 5, 1990.

=== Chicago Blackhawks ===
The Blackhawks goaltending tandem consisted of Jacques Cloutier and Alain Chevrier in 1989–90, but the day after Millen was acquired, Chevrier was traded to the Pittsburgh Penguins. Millen played ten games down the stretch for the Blackhawks and was in net when the playoffs started. Chicago coach Mike Keenan was quick to change up his netminders and that spring actually saw three different goalies (Millen, Cloutier and rookie Ed Belfour) start games, but Millen, with 15 appearances led the way as the Hawks advanced all the way to the Western Conference Finals before losing to the Edmonton Oilers. The following season, Millen lost his starting job and nearly found himself out of the league altogether. Belfour took the starting job and ran with it playing 74 games and posting 43 wins and a stingy 2.24 goals against average. "Eddie answered the Bell," Millen explained. "He probably had as good a year I'd ever seen a goalie play in the NHL. It was a kick in rear for me, a little bit demoralizing." With Cloutier as Belfour's backup, and a Dominik Hašek now in the Chicago system, Millen was not only limited to just 58 minutes of game play in the entire season, but also his stint as a Blackhawk was over. In September 1991, Millen was traded to the New York Rangers for future considerations.

=== New York Rangers ===
The Rangers were involved with prolonged contract negotiations with Mike Richter and they acquired Millen as an "insurance policy". The 1991–92 season started with Richter unsigned, so Millen was John Vanbiesbrouck's back-up for the first two games of the year. On October 7, the Rangers signed a new deal with Richter and Millen was assigned to the San Diego Gulls of the International Hockey League (IHL). After a five-game stint in the IHL, Millen was dealt to the Detroit Red Wings.

=== Detroit Red Wings ===
Detroit had Tim Cheveldae as their starting goaltender but needed a backup for the 1991–92 season. At the start of the year they had acquired Millen's former teammate Vincent Riendeau, who then injured his knee in his Detroit debut which sidelined him long-term. Other solutions like Allan Bester and Scott King had not worked out, so the Red Wings made a move for Millen. With Cheveldae carrying a heavy load, Millen was used sparingly but made the last ten appearances of his career in the Red Wings net before hanging up his pads for good at the end of the season.

== Broadcasting career ==
After ending his career, Millen became the colour commentator on local television broadcasts for the expansion Ottawa Senators. During his 11 seasons affiliated with the Senators, his play-by-play partners included Don Chevrier, Rob Faulds, and Dean Brown. He also paired with Chevrier as the lead broadcasting team for CTV's ice hockey coverage at the 1994 Winter Olympics.

Beginning in the 1995 season, he joined the CBC's Hockey Night in Canada. After a year with CTV Sportsnet, he rejoined HNIC in 1999–2000 as the colour commentator of the network's secondary broadcast team, first paired with Chris Cuthbert and then Jim Hughson, usually covering the second game of the weekly doubleheader and three playoff rounds. He was promoted to the lead team in 2007, working alongside Bob Cole. In this role he worked on CBC's coverage of the 2007 and 2008 Stanley Cup Finals.

In 2005, he moved from the Senators to the Maple Leafs local broadcast team, and in 2007 he became the Leafs' lead television colour commentator, working alongside Joe Bowen on Sportsnet Ontario and Leafs TV.

As of 2014 he worked exclusively for Rogers Communications, both on telecasts that were part of the national television contract under the Hockey Night in Canada, Rogers Monday Night Hockey or Scotiabank Wednesday Night Hockey banners.

Besides working at Sportsnet alongside commentators Rick Ball, Dave Randorf, John Bartlett and others, the legendary broadcaster Bob Cole specifically requested that Millen be his analyst for Cole's final broadcast, ending Cole's 50 year commentating career on Hockey Night in Canada.

He had worked as an analyst on the Maple Leafs regional package that appeared on Sportsnet Ontario. Until his death, he and Cassie Campbell-Pascall worked primarily on Calgary Flames broadcasts under the Hockey Night in Canada banner, and also on Flames regional telecasts when primary analyst Kelly Hrudey was unavailable.

== Personal life and death ==
Millen was married and had four children, including a son, Charlie, a goaltender, who most recently played for the Orlando Solar Bears of the ECHL.

Millen died from a heart attack at a hospital in Bracebridge, Ontario, on April 7, 2025, at the age of 67.

== Career statistics ==
(Source:)

=== Regular season and playoffs ===
			Regular season									Playoffs
Season	Team	League	GP	W	L	T	MIN	GA	SO	GAA	SV%	GP	W	L	MIN	GA	SO	GAA	SV%
1973–74	Markham Waxers	OPJHL	—	—	—	—	—	—	—	—	—	—	—	—	—	—	—	—	—
1974–75	Peterborough Petes	OMJHL	27	—	—	—	1584	90	2	3.41	—	—	—	—	—	—	—	—	—
1975–76	Peterborough Petes	OMJHL	58	—	—	—	3282	233	0	4.26	—	—	—	—	—	—	—	—	—
1976–77	Peterborough Petes	OMJHL	59	—	—	—	3457	244	0	4.23	—	4	—	—	240	23	0	5.75	—
1977–78	Sault Ste. Marie Greyhounds	OMJHL	25	—	—	—	1469	105	1	4.29	—	13	—	—	774	61	0	4.73	—
1977–78	Kalamazoo Wings	IHL	3	—	—	—	180	14	0	4.67	—	—	—	—	—	—	—	—	—
1978–79	Pittsburgh Penguins	NHL	28	14	11	1	1532	86	2	3.37	.888	—	—	—	—	—	—	—	—
1979–80	Pittsburgh Penguins	NHL	44	18	18	7	2586	157	2	3.64	.881	5	2	3	300	21	0	4.20	.868
1980–81	Pittsburgh Penguins	NHL	63	25	27	10	3721	258	0	4.16	.864	5	2	3	325	19	0	3.51	.893
1981–82	Hartford Whalers	NHL	55	11	30	12	3201	229	0	4.29	.873	—	—	—	—	—	—	—	—
1982–83	Hartford Whalers	NHL	60	14	38	6	3520	282	1	4.81	.863	—	—	—	—	—	—	—	—
1983–84	Hartford Whalers	NHL	60	21	30	9	3583	221	2	3.70	.878	—	—	—	—	—	—	—	—
1984–85	Hartford Whalers	NHL	44	16	22	6	2659	187	1	4.22	.855	—	—	—	—	—	—	—	—
1984–85	St. Louis Blues	NHL	10	2	7	1	607	35	0	3.46	.870	1	0	1	60	2	0	2.00	.943
1985–86	St. Louis Blues	NHL	36	14	16	6	2168	129	1	3.57	.886	10	6	3	586	29	0	2.97	.911
1986–87	St. Louis Blues	NHL	42	15	18	9	2482	146	0	3.53	.873	4	1	3	250	10	0	2.40	.918
1987–88	St. Louis Blues	NHL	48	21	19	7	2854	167	1	3.51	.880	10	5	5	600	38	0	3.80	.849
1988–89	St. Louis Blues	NHL	52	22	20	7	3019	170	6	3.38	.880	10	5	5	649	34	0	3.14	.890
1989–90	St. Louis Blues	NHL	21	11	7	3	1245	61	1	2.94	.890	—	—	—	—	—	—	—	—
1989–90	Quebec Nordiques	NHL	18	3	14	1	1080	95	0	5.28	.853	—	—	—	—	—	—	—	—
1989–90	Chicago Blackhawks	NHL	10	5	4	1	575	32	0	3.34	.880	14	6	6	613	40	0	3.92	.867
1990–91	Chicago Blackhawks	NHL	3	0	1	0	58	4	0	4.14	.875	—	—	—	—	—	—	—	—
1991–92	San Diego Gulls	IHL	5	2	3	0	296	20	0	4.05	—	—	—	—	—	—	—	—	—
1991–92	Detroit Red Wings	NHL	10	3	2	3	487	22	0	2.71	.896	—	—	—	—	—	—	—	—
1991–92	Maine Mariners	AHL	11	2	5	2	599	37	0	3.71	.868	—	—	—	—	—	—	—	—
NHL totals			604	215	284	89	35,377	2281	17	3.87	.873	59	27	29	3383	193	0	3.42	.885

=== International ===
Year	Team	Event	GP	W	L	T	MIN	GA	SO	GAA
1982	Canada	WC	5	2	1	2	300	14	1	2.80
