= Ryan Walter =

Canadian ice hockey player (born 1958)

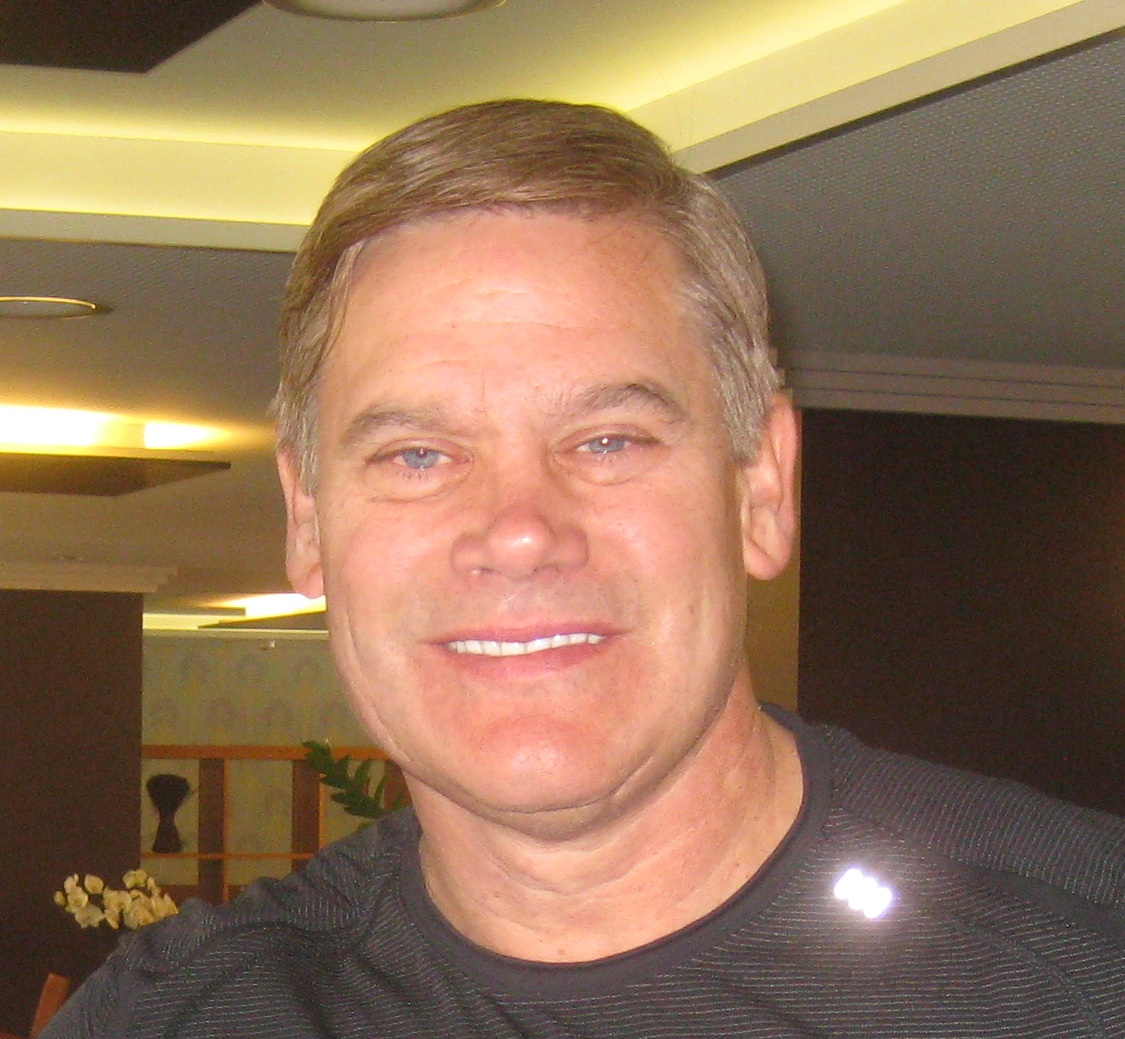
- Walter in 2011
- Born: April 23, 1958 (age 68) New Westminster, British Columbia, Canada
- Height: 6 ft 0 in (183 cm)
- Weight: 195 lb (88 kg; 13 st 13 lb)
- Position: Centre
- Shot: Left
- Played for: Washington Capitals; Montreal Canadiens; Vancouver Canucks
- National team: Canada
- NHL draft: 2nd overall, 1978; Washington Capitals
- Playing career: 1978–1993
Medal record
Representing Canada
Ice hockey
World Championships
Bronze medal – third place	1982 Finland

Ryan William Walter (born April 23, 1958) is a Canadian former professional ice hockey centre who played 15 seasons in the National Hockey League (NHL). He won the 1986 Stanley Cup with the Montreal Canadiens.

He was also an assistant coach with the Vancouver Canucks, head coach of the Canadian National Women's hockey team, a hockey broadcaster and president of the Abbotsford Heat of the American Hockey League (AHL).

== Early life ==
Walter was born in New Westminster, British Columbia, but grew up in Burnaby, British Columbia. As a youth, he played in the 1971 Quebec International Pee-Wee Hockey Tournament with a minor ice hockey team from Burnaby. He served as captain of the Canadian team in the World Junior tournament and was soon drafted by the Washington Capitals.

== NHL career ==
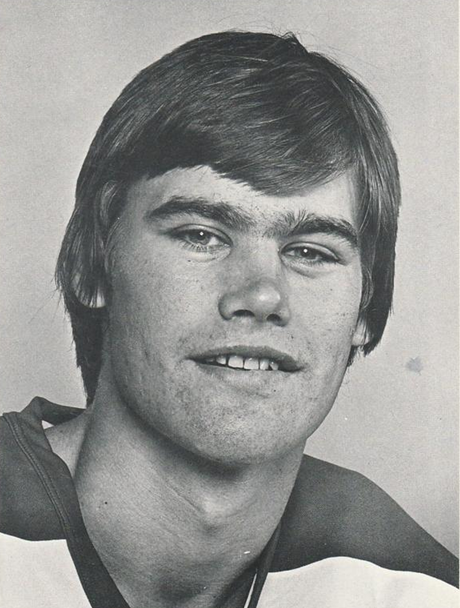
1980 photo of Ryan Walter for Washington Capitals

Walter was drafted second overall by the Washington Capitals in the 1978 NHL Amateur Draft. For the 1978-79 season, he missed all of training camp and the first two weeks of the season due to a freak injury to his knee when playing catch with a lacrosse ball with his brother. He played 69 games and recorded 28 goals and 27 assists. He finished second Bobby Smith in the balloting for the Calder Trophy for his rookie play. Prior to his second pro season, he was named team captain, becoming the youngest player in the history of the NHL to hold that position, doing so at the age of 21.

In September 1982, Walter and Rick Green were traded to the Montreal Canadiens as part of a six-player blockbuster deal in exchange for Brian Engblom, Doug Jarvis, Rod Langway (who succeeded Walter as captain of the Capitals) and Craig Laughlin. Walter's name is engraved on the Stanley Cup, which the Canadiens won in 1986 though Walter was injured for most of the playoffs. In the 1989 Stanley Cup Final, he scored in the second overtime period of game three to give the Canadiens a 2–1 series lead. However, the Calgary Flames came back to win the series and the Cup. In 1991, he signed as a free agent with the Vancouver Canucks, where he played the final two seasons of his career and won the Budweiser NHL Man of the Year Award in 1992. He was known as a tough, hard-working player who was excellent in the face-off circle. Walter also served as vice president of the NHLPA.

== Broadcasting career ==
From 1993–94 until 1997–98, he worked for TSN as the network's secondary hockey colour commentator. In this role, he worked on NHL, CHL, and IIHF broadcasts. He worked five Memorial Cups, one World Junior Hockey Championship, and four World Hockey Championships. From 1996–97 until 2001–02, he was the colour commentator on Vancouver Canucks television broadcasts on BCTV, Rogers Sportsnet and VTV. He also occasionally filled in on radio when Tom Larscheid had football duties. In these roles, he was teamed up with, at various times, Jim Robson, Jim Hughson and John Shorthouse.

== Coaching career ==
On June 17, 2008, Walter was named an assistant coach to Alain Vigneault of the Vancouver Canucks. He was relieved of his duties after the 2009–10 season. On September 21, 2010, Walter was named head coach of Canada's women's hockey team which won the gold medal at the 2010 Four Nations Cup.

== Front office ==
Walter served as the president of the Abbotsford Heat of the American Hockey League, which was the minor-league affiliate of the Calgary Flames from 2011 to 2014.

== Personal life ==
Walter is a motivational speaker, author and leadership expert, using his experiences in hockey to relate to business and success. Early in his hockey career, he became a born again Christian, which was spurred by an experience of plane turbulence.

Walter also had a cameo appearance in the movie Miracle, playing the referee in the game between the US and USSR in Lake Placid and was hired by Disney to be a hockey expert for the movie. He was also hired as a hockey expert for both seasons of Making the Cut: Last Man Standing, a Nike hockey commercial, and played himself on an episode of the Canadian animated television series Being Ian.

Walter and his wife, Jennifer have three sons who are also hockey players. His oldest son, Ben, was drafted by the Boston Bruins and played 24 games in the NHL. Joey played with the Langley Chiefs of the BCHL and the Trinity Western University Spartans, and his other son, Ryan Jr., played for the TWU Titans in 2006-07 and 2007–08 as well as the Liberty University club hockey team.

== Career statistics ==
=== Regular season and playoffs ===
			Regular season					Playoffs
Season	Team	League	GP	G	A	Pts	PIM	GP	G	A	Pts	PIM
1973–74	Langley Lords	BCHL	62	40	62	102	—	—	—	—	—	—
1973–74	Kamloops Chiefs	WCHL	2	0	0	0	0	—	—	—	—	—
1974–75	Langley Lords	BCHL	52	32	60	92	111	—	—	—	—	—
1974–75	Kamloops Chiefs	WCHL	9	8	4	12	2	2	1	1	2	2
1975–76	Kamloops Chiefs	WCHL	72	35	49	84	96	12	3	9	12	10
1976–77	Kamloops Chiefs	WCHL	71	41	58	99	100	5	1	3	4	11
1977–78	Seattle Breakers	WCHL	62	54	71	125	148	—	—	—	—	—
1978–79	Calgary Wranglers	WHL	2	0	1	1	0	—	—	—	—	—
1978–79	Washington Capitals	NHL	69	28	27	55	70	—	—	—	—	—
1979–80	Washington Capitals	NHL	80	24	42	66	106	—	—	—	—	—
1980–81	Washington Capitals	NHL	80	24	45	69	150	—	—	—	—	—
1981–82	Washington Capitals	NHL	78	38	49	87	142	—	—	—	—	—
1982–83	Montreal Canadiens	NHL	80	29	46	75	40	3	0	0	0	11
1983–84	Montreal Canadiens	NHL	73	20	29	49	83	15	2	1	3	4
1984–85	Montreal Canadiens	NHL	72	19	19	38	59	12	2	7	9	13
1985–86	Montreal Canadiens	NHL	69	15	34	49	45	5	0	1	1	2
1986–87	Montreal Canadiens	NHL	76	23	23	46	34	17	7	12	19	10
1987–88	Montreal Canadiens	NHL	61	13	23	36	39	11	2	4	6	6
1988–89	Montreal Canadiens	NHL	78	14	17	31	48	21	3	5	8	6
1989–90	Montreal Canadiens	NHL	70	8	16	24	59	11	0	2	2	0
1990–91	Montreal Canadiens	NHL	25	0	1	1	12	5	0	0	0	2
1991–92	Vancouver Canucks	NHL	67	6	11	17	49	13	0	3	3	8
1992–93	Vancouver Canucks	NHL	25	3	0	3	10	—	—	—	—	—
NHL totals			1,003	264	382	646	946	113	16	35	51	62

=== International ===
Year	Team	Event	GP	G	A	Pts	PIM
1978	Canada	WJC	6	5	3	8	4
1979	Canada	WC	8	4	1	5	4
1981	Canada	WC	8	0	1	1	2
1982	Canada	WC	4	1	3	4	0
Junior totals			6	5	3	8	4
Senior totals			20	5	5	10	6

== Awards ==
- WCHL First All-Star Team – 1978

== See also ==
- List of NHL players with 1,000 games played

Preceded by Robert Picard	Washington Capitals first-round draft pick 1978	Succeeded by Tim Coulis
Preceded by Guy Charron	Washington Capitals captain 1979–82	Succeeded by Rod Langway
