= John Shorthouse =

Canadian sports broadcaster

- Born: January 31, 1970 (age 56); Vancouver, British Columbia, Canada
- Occupation: Sportscaster

John Douglas Shorthouse (born January 31, 1970) is a Canadian sports broadcaster based in Vancouver, British Columbia. He is the lead play-by-play commentator for the Vancouver Canucks on Sportsnet Pacific television. He also calls select nationally-televised games on Sportsnet and Hockey Night in Canada.

== Broadcast career ==
Born in Vancouver, British Columbia, Canada, Shorthouse began his broadcasting career on local station CKVU-TV in 1993. He was one of the anchors of a popular late-night sports program called Sports Page.

In 1996, while still working for CKVU, he began working as a reporter on Canucks pay-per-view telecasts and called his first NHL hockey game in the play-by-play role as a substitute on March 24, 1998 against the New York Islanders. This game was significant because it featured the return of popular ex-Canucks Trevor Linden and Gino Odjick for the first time. The following season, with the inception of CTV Sportsnet (now simply Sportsnet), the Canucks greatly expanded their local television coverage and Shorthouse was hired to split play-by-play duties with hall-of-famer Jim Robson. He also filled in on radio broadcasts when Jim Hughson was assigned to national Sportsnet telecasts. The following year, Robson retired, and Shorthouse became the permanent radio play-by-play personality, while Hughson moved to television full-time.

He was the radio voice of the Canucks from 1999–00 until 2007–08, working alongside colour commentator Tom Larscheid. The two moved over from radio station CKNW to CKST when the Canucks' broadcasting rights changed in 2006. Shorthouse was often seen as the more even-handed of the two in comparison with his exuberant colleague Larscheid.

In March 2008, Hughson left his Canucks' play-by-play position on Rogers Sportsnet to take on CBC telecasts full-time. On June 3, 2008, it was announced that Shorthouse would take over that position. He would continue to call Canucks games on radio with Team 1040, later TSN 1040, whenever he was not assigned to a television broadcast, up until the radio rights for the team transferred to Sportsnet 650 following the 2016–17 season. Shorthouse was paired with John Garrett until the commentator's retirement in 2023. Beginning in 2014, when Rogers acquired the national television rights to the NHL in Canada, Shorthouse also gets occasional network assignments on Sportsnet or Hockey Night in Canada.

During the 2023 Stanley Cup playoffs, Shorthouse was assigned to call his first-ever playoff series on television, the first-round series between the Boston Bruins and Florida Panthers.

As of the 2023–24 season, Shorthouse currently calls Canucks games on Sportsnet Pacific with a rotating pair of colour commentators in Dave Tomlinson and Ray Ferraro. Partnered with Tomlinson during the 2024 Stanley Cup playoffs, Shorthouse called Canucks playoff games on television for the first time in his career, covering Vancouver's first-round series versus the Nashville Predators.
