= Tom Larscheid =

Canadian football player and sportscaster (born 1940)

- Born: April 6, 1940 (age 86); Milwaukee, Wisconsin, U.S.
- Occupation: Sportscaster

Tom Larscheid (born April 6, 1940) is a former Vancouver-based radio sports broadcaster and football player. After a career playing college and CFL football, he was the colour commentator for the CFL's BC Lions and the NHL's Vancouver Canucks for many years. After 45 years in broadcasting and covering the Canucks for 27 seasons, he did his last game on October 9, 2010, for the 2010-11 season opener.

== Early life and sports career ==
Larscheid, born in Milwaukee, Wisconsin and raised in California, was a running back for Utah State University, where he was an All-American in 1960. In that year he led the nation with a rushing average of 8.4 yards. Highlights of his playing days at Utah State include a 76-yard pass reception against Hawaii in 1959, a 102-yard kickoff return against BYU in 1960, and an 85-yard punt return versus Utah in 1961.

Larscheid was selected in the 18th round (251st overall) of the 1962 NFL draft by the Philadelphia Eagles,. He ended up signing with the British Columbia Lions of the Canadian Football League, where he played only two seasons before being forced to retire due to knee injuries.

== Broadcasting career ==
After his retirement from football, he became the colour commentator for the BC Lions on CKNW beginning in 1965, working alongside play-by-play commentator Jim Cox. In 1977, he added hockey broadcasting to his duties, joining Jim Robson in the booth for Vancouver Canucks radio broadcasts. When the Lions radio rights moved to CFUN in 1983, Larscheid went with them and left the Canucks broadcasts. In 1984, Cox retired and J. P. McConnell became the new "voice of the Lions". In 1988, the Lions moved back to CKNW and Larscheid resumed his work with the Canucks. Larscheid's duties included television as well, when the Canucks simulcasted their radio broadcasts on BCTV or CHEK-TV. From 1987 to 1990, Larscheid did television work for football as well, working on the CFL-produced Canadian Football Network, where he worked as a colour commentator on the network's secondary broadcast team and worked four Grey Cups as a sideline reporter and field-level analyst. In 1994, Robson moved to TV full-time, and Jim Hughson was Larscheid's new partner. In 1999, Hughson moved back to television full-time and Larscheid was paired with John Shorthouse. All through this time, he continued to juggle both football and hockey. However, this meant frequent scheduling conflicts and in 2000 he was pulled off Lions broadcasts in order to work full-time on Canucks games.

In 2006, Larscheid and Shorthouse moved to radio station CKST ("The Team 1040"), when that station won the Canucks broadcasting rights from CKNW. In addition to acting as a colour commentator, Larscheid regularly interviewed guests between periods in the broadcast booth.

In early March 2007, Larscheid hinted that he might retire from his colour commentary duties at the end of the 2006–07 hockey season, his 24th with the Canucks. However, Larscheid on May 15, 2007, signed a new 1-year contract with TEAM 1040 to continue being the colour commentator for the Vancouver Canucks.

Tom also made daily appearances on the "Canucks Lunch with Blake Price and Dave Tomlinson" radio show.

On July 28, 2010, Larscheid announced that he would be retiring at the start of the 2010–11 season. His final radio call was the Vancouver Canucks season opener against the Los Angeles Kings on October 9. He spent 27 seasons as the colour commentator for the Vancouver Canucks and was replaced by Dave Tomlinson.

== On-air personality ==
Larscheid was known for his enthusiasm. He didn't hide his support for the Canucks or the Lions. He would criticize players, coaches and officials, including players of the home teams whom he didn't think gave a maximum effort.

There were a couple of incidents where he uttered expletives on the air, for which he later apologized. One was during Game 1 of the 1994 Western Conference Final, when Toronto defenceman Jamie Macoun speared Vancouver's Murray Craven, causing an angered Larscheid to exclaim, "That's just bullshit!" Another was during the famous incident in 2000 when Boston defenceman Marty McSorley two-handed Vancouver's Donald Brashear over the head, which prompted Larscheid to react in a similar way.

== See also ==
- List of NCAA major college yearly punt and kickoff return leaders
