= Jim Robson =

Canadian sportscaster (1935–2026)

Jim Robson OBC
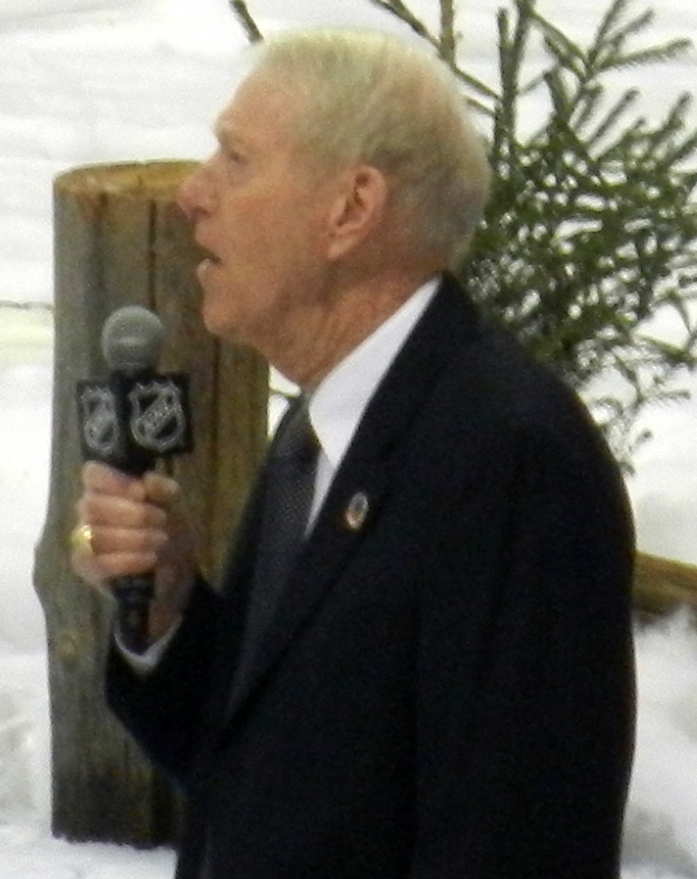
- Robson speaking before the 2014 Heritage Classic
- Born: January 17, 1935; Prince Albert, Saskatchewan, Canada
- Died: February 9, 2026 (aged 91); Vancouver, British Columbia, Canada
- Occupation: Broadcaster
- Years active: 1952–1999
- Spouse: Bea
- Children: 4

James Alexander Robson OBC (January 17, 1935 – February 9, 2026) was a Canadian radio and television broadcaster who was the play-by-play announcer of the Vancouver Canucks' games from 1970 to 1999. Robson was considered a "legendary" Canadian broadcaster whose "voice was synonymous with the Vancouver Canucks for more than three decades". He retired April 14, 1999. Robson is a member of the B.C. Sports Hall of Fame, the CAB Broadcast Hall of Fame, and was inducted into the Order of British Columbia in 2011.

== Broadcasting career ==
Born in Prince Albert, Saskatchewan on January 17, 1935, Robson started his career at the age of 17 covering senior men's basketball for CJAV radio station in Port Alberni. In 1955, Robson started working for CHUB radio in Nanaimo, where he covered the Mann Cup lacrosse finals.

By 1956, Robson found himself in Vancouver covering the BC Lions football team, the Vancouver Mounties baseball team and the then WHL Vancouver Canucks hockey team on CKWX.

=== Vancouver Canucks ===
When the Vancouver Canucks became an NHL expansion team in 1970, Robson moved to CKNW to announce the team's games; he was popularly known as the "Voice of the Canucks" for nearly three decades. For the first seven years, he usually worked alone. For road games, he broadcast the game without a colour commentator and provided the pre-game, intermission, and post-game shows. In 1977–78, he was joined by former BC Lions player and broadcaster Tom Larscheid. From 1983–84 to 1987–88, his broadcasting partner was ex-Canuck Garry Monahan before Larscheid rejoined him in 1988–89.

He also covered the Vancouver Canucks on television broadcasts on BCTV, CHEK-TV and VTV from 1985–86 through 1998–99. From 1987–88 to 1993–94, Robson provided both radio and television play-by-play for the Canucks on simulcasts, alongside colour commentators Monahan and Larscheid. Howie Meeker, who for years had teamed with Robson on Hockey Night in Canada telecasts, joined him on Canucks games on BCTV in 1985–86.

Robson stepped down as the radio announcer for the Canucks in 1994 and moved to television full-time. His last radio broadcast was game seven of the 1994 Stanley Cup Final between the Canucks and the New York Rangers. Robson served as the Canucks' TV announcer for five more seasons, working alongside colour commentators Darcy Rota (1994–95 to 1995–96) and Ryan Walter (1996–97 to 1998–99). His replacement on radio was Jim Hughson, who later moved to Rogers Sportsnet, and then to CBC's Hockey Night in Canada. In his final season, Robson split television play-by-play duties with rookie John Shorthouse, who has been a Canucks broadcaster ever since.

=== National television ===
Robson also worked for CBC's Hockey Night in Canada, mostly covering games in western Canada. It was for HNIC that he broadcast the Canucks' first NHL game, a 3–1 home loss to the Los Angeles Kings on October 9, 1970. His reputation as one of the top broadcasters in the business earned him assignments to cover the Stanley Cup Final in 1975, 1980, 1982 (in which the Canucks faced the New York Islanders), and 1983.

He also covered five NHL All-Star Games, including in 1977 (Vancouver), 1981 (Los Angeles), and 1983 (Long Island). He left HNIC after the 1984–85 season, but had a couple of national TV assignments afterward; for CBC in the 1987 playoffs and CanWest Global for the 1988 Smythe Division Final between the Edmonton Oilers and Calgary Flames.

Nationally, Robson is probably best remembered for his call of Bob Nystrom's Cup-winning overtime goal for the Islanders in 1980. Locally, his voice is linked to every significant Canucks moment in the 1970s, 1980s, and 1990s, particularly the 1982 and 1994 Stanley Cup playoffs.

Robson was also well known for taking time to say "a special hello to all the hospital patients and shut-ins, those of you who can't make it out to the game", during each of his broadcasts, both on radio and TV. Robson was also known for his colorful descriptions of team uniforms and conversational approach to the game.

== Achievements ==
Robson was awarded the Foster Hewitt Memorial Award by the Hockey Hall of Fame in 1992, and was inducted into the BC Hockey Hall of Fame in 1998 and the BC Sports Hall of Fame in 2000. In 2002, at the Canadian Association of Broadcasters annual meeting in Vancouver, Robson was inducted to the CAB Broadcast Hall of Fame.

The broadcast booth at Rogers Arena is named after him.

Robson was appointed a Member of the Order of British Columbia (OBC) in September 2011.

== Memorable calls ==
The pass, right on the stick of Tonelli. Coming in with Nystrom, Tonelli to Nystrom, HE SCORES! Bob Nystrom scores the goal! The Islanders win the Stanley Cup!

— The overtime goal that won the Stanley Cup for the New York Islanders in 1980

Babych, long shot. Potvin has trouble with it. Adams shoots, SCORES! Greg Adams! Greg Adams! Adams gets the winner fourteen seconds into the second overtime! The Vancouver Canucks are going to the Stanley Cup Final!

— The double overtime goal that advanced his team, the Vancouver Canucks to the 1994 Stanley Cup Final.

He'll play, you know he'll play. He'll play on crutches. He will play, and he'll play on Tuesday night at Madison Square Garden; the game is over!

— The call as the final seconds ticked off the clock of Game 6 in the 1994 Stanley Cup Final. He was referring to Trevor Linden, who was very bloody after taking a high stick, which led to one of the most famous photos in Vancouver Canucks history, of Linden hugging Canucks goaltender Kirk McLean, with blood on Linden's jersey.

== Later life and death ==
Robson died at a care home in Vancouver, on February 9, 2026, at the age of 91. He was undergoing treatment for cancer at the time of his death.

Preceded by Bill Hewitt; Bob Cole	Canadian network television play-by-play announcer 1975, 1980, 1982–1983 (with Danny Gallivan in 1975, with Bob Cole and Dan Kelly in 1980, called the games from Vancouver in 1982)	Succeeded by Danny Gallivan; Bob Cole
