= Sports Page =

Canadian sports television program

- Starring: See below
- Country of origin: Canada

Production
- Running time: 30 minutes

Original release
- Network: CKVU-TV (1977–2001); CHEK-TV (2001–05)
- Release: May 9, 1977 – September 2, 2005

Sports Page is a Canadian sports highlights television program that aired on CKVU-TV Vancouver from September 5, 1977 until August 31, 2001, and later on CHEK-TV Victoria, British Columbia, from September 2, 2001 until September 2, 2005. It was known for its personality-driven, irreverent approach (including the humorous annual Christmas Eve special, Yulin' with the Page), and for helping to launch the careers of several broadcasters, many of whom later worked for sports television outlets such as Rogers Sportsnet, TSN, and Vancouver radio station The Team 1040.

Sports Page aired Monday to Friday at 11:00 pm in its early years, with a Sunday edition from September to January, during the NFL season, before expanding to six nights a week (Sunday to Friday) year-round in later years. There were also a couple of special Saturday editions in June 1994 on days where the Vancouver Canucks played games in the Stanley Cup Finals.

Sports Page covered the National Hockey League, Canadian Football League, National Football League, National Basketball Association, Major League Baseball and top golf, tennis, curling and auto racing events, with expanded coverage of the Canucks, BC Lions and Vancouver Grizzlies, including post-game interviews following home games. They also covered the Western Lacrosse Association other local sports teams such as baseball's Vancouver Canadians, soccer's Vancouver 86ers and inline hockey's Vancouver Voodoo, with highlights of their home games (and away games, if available). Sports Page also covered BC university and high-school athletics – with emphasis on UBC Thunderbirds and Simon Fraser Clan football and basketball and Victoria Vikings basketball, and the provincial high-school football and boys and girls basketball championships – and junior hockey. They would also have special features on local athletes or high-profile athletes with a strong B.C. connection when they were in the Vancouver area for a sporting event.

== Sports Page hosts over the years ==
- Paul Carson (1980–99)
- Jay Durant (?–2005)
- Dan Elliott (?–2005)
- Shane Foxman (?–?)
- Robb Glazier (1977–79)
- John Good (1977–79)
- Chris Hebb (1984–90)
- Barry Houlihan (1978–83)
- Barry Macdonald (1988–89, 1995–2004)
- Sean McCormick (1998–2005)
- Craig MacEwen (1993–2000)
- Dan Murphy (1995–1999)
- Blake Price (1999–2001)
- Dave Randorf (1989–95)
- Scott Rintoul (?–?)
- Squire Barnes (?-?)
- Gord Robson (1978–80)
- Richard Saxton (1977–82)
- John Shorthouse (1993–98)
- Don Taylor (1985–2000)
