= 2010–11 Vancouver Canucks season =

NHL hockey team season

2010–11 Vancouver Canucks
- Presidents' Trophy winners
- Western Conference champions
- Northwest Division champions
- Division: 1st Northwest
- Conference: 1st Western
- 2010–11 record: 54–19–9
- Home record: 27–9–5
- Road record: 27–10–4
- Goals for: 262
- Goals against: 185

Team information
- General manager: Mike Gillis
- Coach: Alain Vigneault
- Captain: Henrik Sedin
- Alternate captains: Kevin Bieksa; Ryan Kesler; Manny Malhotra; Daniel Sedin
- Arena: Rogers Arena
- Average attendance: 18,860 (100.3%)
- Minor league affiliates: Manitoba Moose (AHL); Victoria Salmon Kings (ECHL)

Team leaders
- Goals: Daniel Sedin (41); Ryan Kesler (41)
- Assists: Henrik Sedin (75)
- Points: Daniel Sedin (104)
- Penalty minutes: Raffi Torres (78)
- Plus/minus: Kevin Bieksa (+32)
- Wins: Roberto Luongo (38)
- Goals against average: Roberto Luongo (2.11)

The 2010–11 Vancouver Canucks season was the 41st season in the modern Canucks history. The Vancouver Canucks won their fifth Northwest division title, third conference championship and first Presidents' Trophy. They also reached the Stanley Cup Final for the third time in franchise history, losing to the Boston Bruins in seven games. This marked the last time a Canadian team contended in the Stanley Cup Final until the Montreal Canadiens did so in 2021, ten years later.

As of the 2025-26 NHL season, this is the most recent Presidents’ Trophy winner to reach the Finals in a full 82-game season.

== Events ==
=== Off-season ===
==== Entry draft ====
The 2010 NHL entry draft was held June 25–26, 2010, at Staples Center in Los Angeles, California. The Canucks had the 25th overall draft choice in the first round as a result of being defeated by the Chicago Blackhawks in the Western Conference semi-final, but that draft choice was traded to the Florida Panthers. The Canucks also did not have a second- or third-round draft pick. Their second-round pick was traded to the Buffalo Sabres in exchange for Steve Bernier. Their third-round pick was traded to the Carolina Hurricanes at the NHL trade deadline in exchange for Andrew Alberts. The Canucks acquired an additional sixth-round draft choice from the Phoenix Coyotes as a result of a trade that sent Mathieu Schneider to Phoenix. Vancouver had the 115th, 145th, 172nd, 175th and 205th overall draft choices.

==== Trades ====
On June 25, 2010, the Canucks acquired Keith Ballard and Victor Oreskovich from the Florida Panthers in exchange for Steve Bernier, Michael Grabner and the 25th overall pick in the 2010 NHL Entry Draft.

Mike Gillis traded Shane O'Brien and Dan Gendur to the Nashville Predators in exchange for Ryan Parent and Jonas Andersson on October 5, 2010. Parent was immediately waived after being acquired while Andersson was assigned to the Manitoba Moose (now St. John's Ice Caps) of the American Hockey League. On October 6, Darcy Hordichuk was traded to the Florida Panthers in exchange for Andrew Peters. Peters would play for the Manitoba Moose.

On October 7, Mike Gillis made another trade with the Florida Panthers, this time acquiring Nathan Paetsch for Sean Zimmerman.

==== Player signings ====
On April 6, 2010, the Canucks signed Swedish goaltender Eddie Läck to a two-year entry-level contract. Lack spent the 2009–10 season as a member of the Brynäs IF, posting a 2.67 goals against average (GAA) and a .911 save percentage. He was expected to start the year with the Manitoba Moose.

On May 31, 2010, the Canucks announced that they signed three defencemen, including prospect Yann Sauvé. Sauvé was drafted 41st overall by the Canucks in the 2008 draft. In addition, they signed free agent Lee Sweatt and Christopher Tanev. Sweatt split time in the Finnish SM-liiga and Kontinental Hockey League (KHL) for the 2009–10 season. He registered nine goals and seven assists in 21 games for TPS in Finland. Sweatt added two goals and five assists in 37 games in the KHL with Dinamo Riga. Christopher Tanev signed as a free agent after playing in the NCAA, where he scored 10 goals and 18 assists in 41 games for the RIT Tigers.

On June 1, 2010, Vancouver signed Anton Rödin to a three-year, entry-level contract. Rödin was drafted 53rd overall by the Canucks in the 2009 Draft. He spent the 2009–10 season in the Swedish Elite League with Brynäs IF. He also played at the 2010 World Junior Championships, where he won a bronze medal with Sweden. He finished the tournament tied for second in scoring for Sweden with three goals and ten points, good enough for ninth in the tournament.

On June 2, 2010, Mike Gillis signed Cory Schneider to a contract extension with the team. He was drafted in the first round, 26th overall, of the 2004 NHL entry draft by the Canucks. He spent the last two seasons playing with the Manitoba Moose of the AHL, where he was named the League's Goaltender of the Year in 2008–09 while leading the Moose to the Calder Cup Final. The Canucks also announced that they signed Peter Andersson to an entry-level contract. Andersson was drafted 143rd overall by the Canucks in 2009.

On June 16, 2010, the Vancouver Canucks re-signed pending unrestricted free agent Aaron Rome to a two-year contract. The deal is worth $1.5 million and will have a salary cap hit of $750,000 per season. On July 2, 2010, Alexandre Bolduc signed a one-year, two-way contract worth $500,000. Shane O'Brien re-signed with the Canucks on July 6, 2010, when he accepted his qualifying offer. The new contract will pay O'Brien $1.6 million for one year. Tanner Glass also signed a one-year contract worth $625,000.

On July 22, Jannik Hansen was awarded a one-year contract worth $825,000 by an arbitrator.

On July 26, the Canucks re-signed Mason Raymond to a new two-year contract worth a total of $5.1 million.

==== Free agency ====
On July 1, the Vancouver Canucks signed Dan Hamhuis to a six-year contract worth $27 million, Jeff Tambellini to a 1-year contract worth $500,000, Manny Malhotra to a three-year contract worth $7.5 million and Joel Perrault to a one-year contract worth $510,000. The Canucks signed Tyler Weiman on July 12 to a one-year contract worth $500,000.

On August 19, Vancouver signed unrestricted free agent Bill Sweatt, the younger brother of Lee Sweatt, to a three-year, entry-level contract worth $2.7 million. The contract also includes an additional $300,000 per season in potential performance bonuses. Bill Sweatt was drafted 38th overall by the Chicago Blackhawks in 2007, but decided not to sign a contract until completing four years of college. He was subsequently traded to the Toronto Maple Leafs along with Kris Versteeg, but maintained his desire to test free agency. He eventually decided to re-unite with his brother in Vancouver.

The Canucks signed unrestricted free agent Raffi Torres to a one-year contract worth $1 million on August 25.

On October 7, the Canucks signed Peter Schaefer to a one-year, two-way contract worth $600,000. Schaefer played for the Canucks between 1998 and 2000 before being traded to the Ottawa Senators for Sami Salo.

=== Pre-season ===
==== Training camp ====
The Canucks held their training camp in Penticton, British Columbia, at the South Okanagan Events Centre. In addition to training camp, the Canucks hosted a Young Stars prospect tournament prior to the start of training camp from September 12 to 16. The event featured prospects from five teams in an eight-game round robin format. The tournament included the Anaheim Ducks, Calgary Flames, Edmonton Oilers and San Jose Sharks. The Canucks finished the tournament with a record of 2–2.

Shortly before the start of training camp, Roberto Luongo announced that he would be relinquishing his captaincy. Luongo served as the team captain for two seasons. Forward Henrik Sedin, was named team captain.

==== Schedule ====
The Canucks' pre-season schedule began on September 21 against the Calgary Flames. It will be a split series where each franchise will split into two squads to play two simultaneous games, one at the Saddledome in Calgary and one at Rogers Arena in Vancouver. In addition, the Canucks will play each of the Edmonton Oilers, Anaheim Ducks and San Jose Sharks twice, once at home and once on the road. The Canucks finished the preseason with a record of 3–5.

=== Regular season ===
==== Schedule ====
The Canucks officially kicked off their 2010–11 campaign on October 9 at Rogers Arena against the Los Angeles Kings. With the Canucks celebrating their 40th anniversary, the NHL scheduled this game to honour the Canucks' first-ever NHL game against the Los Angeles Kings on October 9, 1970. The Canucks lost the game in a shootout by a score of 2–1. They began the season slowly, going 2–3–1 in their first six games before going on a six-game winning streak. The loss to break the streak came as part of a five-game road trip where they recorded a 2–2–1 record before returning home for their most lopsided loss of the year, a 7–1 defeat at the hands of the Chicago Blackhawks. Following the loss the Canucks went 18–4–3, which included an eight-game winning streak, and two four-game winning streaks, before losing three consecutive games in extra time. They proceeded to win the next six games, but ended February alternating wins and losses. Vancouver's win against the Minnesota Wild on March 14, 2011, put the team at 101 points in the standings. It was the fastest the Canucks reached the 100-point mark in franchise history. Next, the team recorded its 50th victory of the season for the first time in franchise history on March 27. They would get top seed in the Western Conference on 2 days later. And it would get its first Presidents' Trophy two days later. The season finale took place on April 9, 2011, against the Calgary Flames, which saw the Canucks win 3–2 in overtime. Daniel Sedin registered two assists in order to clinch the Art Ross Trophy, a year after his brother did it.

Excluding four shootout-winning goals, the Canucks scored 258 goals, the most in the League. Furthermore, excluding their five shootout goals allowed, the Canucks gave up only 180 goals in their 82 games, the fewest in the League. They also scored the most power-play goals, with 72, and had the best power-play percentage, at 24.32% (72 for 296).

The Canucks were also the first team since the 1978 champion Montreal Canadiens to finish the league with the most goals scored and fewest goals against. They also finished the regular season with the top ranked power play and third ranked penalty kill. They almost finished the same identical record as the 1988–89 Flames (except they had two fewer losses).

==== Special events ====
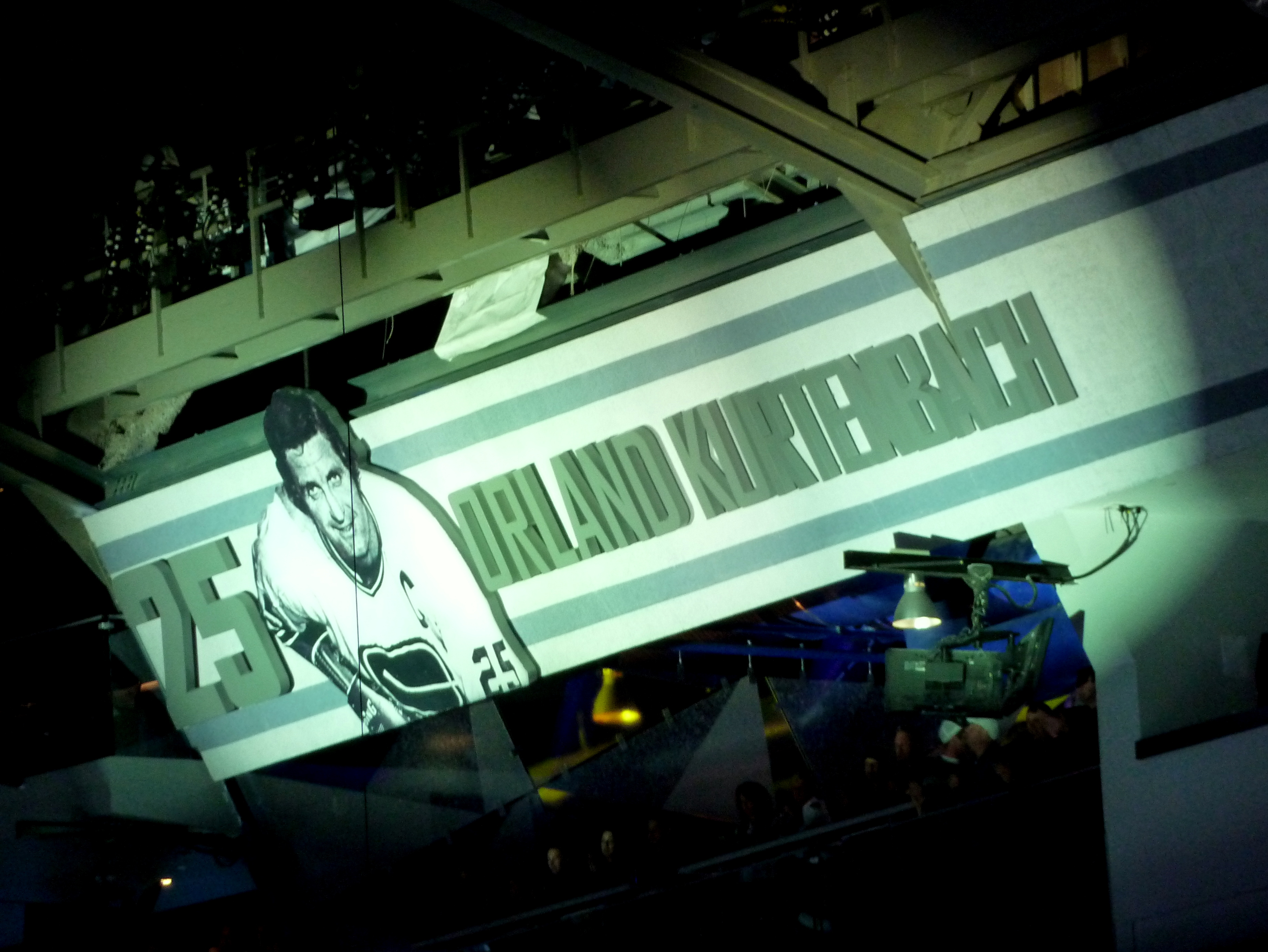
Orland Kurtenbach's plaque on the Canucks' Ring of Honour in Rogers Arena.

The Canucks kicked off their season with a pre-game ceremony on October 9, 2010, to commemorate their 40th Anniversary. They also announced Henrik Sedin as the 13th captain of the team.

Prior to their game on December 11, 2010, against the Tampa Bay Lightning, the Canucks honoured Markus Näslund by retiring his number 19 jersey. Näslund was the third player in franchise history to receive the honour following Stan Smyl and Trevor Linden. Näslund spent 12 seasons with the Canucks, nine as captain. He also holds the franchise lead in points scored with 756. The retirement ceremony coincided with Mattias Öhlund's return to Vancouver for the first time since signing with the Lightning in 2009.

The Canucks also announced that they will be introducing a "Ring of Honour" to commemorate past players. Four players will have their names added to the ring this season. The first player to get the honour will be Orland Kurtenbach who was the first ever captain of the Vancouver Canucks. Kurtenbach's ceremony took place on October 26. Kirk McLean was added to the ring of honour on November 24. McLean helped lead the Canucks to game seven of the 1994 Stanley Cup Final. The third player to be inducted into the Ring of Honour will be Thomas Gradin on January 24. Gradin was part of the 1982 Canucks team that made it to the Stanley Cup Final. He now works as a European scout for organization and is heavily praised at having convinced then-general manager Dave Nonis to draft Alexander Edler.

The final ceremony took place on March 14 when Harold Snepsts was inducted into the Ring of Honour.

=== Playoffs ===
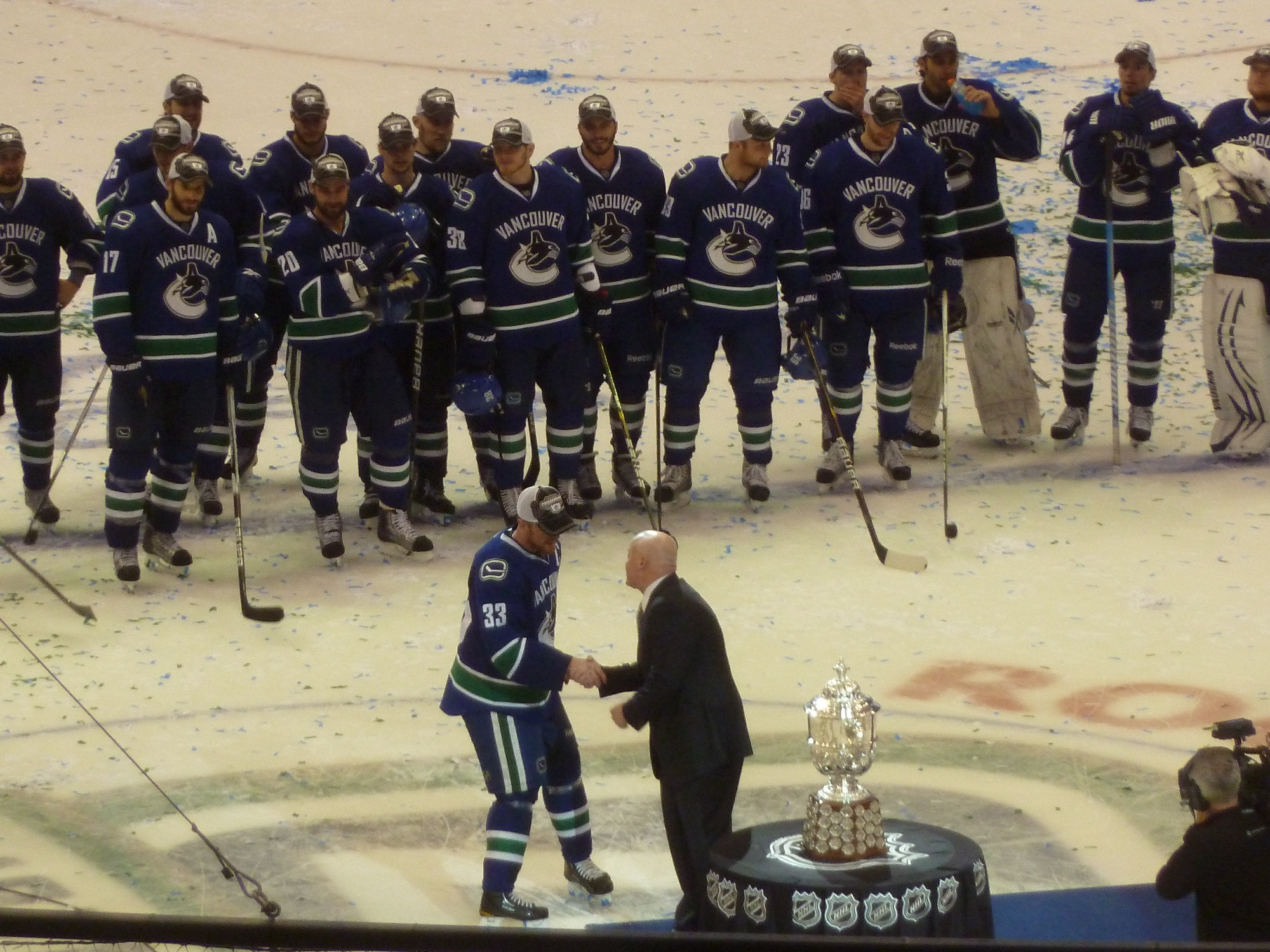
Henrik Sedin accepts the Clarence S. Campbell Bowl after the Vancouver Canucks beat the San Jose Sharks to win the Western Conference finals

The Vancouver Canucks were the first team in the NHL to clinch a berth in the playoffs. Two weeks later, they clinched their division on March 16. The win earned them their fourth Northwest Division title in five years, thus guaranteeing them home ice advantage in the first round of the Stanley Cup playoffs. This was the fastest the team had clinched a playoff spot in franchise history. The team earned the top seed in the Western Conference on March 29 and the Presidents' Trophy two days later, guaranteeing home ice advantage throughout the playoffs.

The Canucks opened their post-season schedule with a series against the eighth-seeded and defending Stanley Cup champion Chicago Blackhawks. This was the third time the two teams played in the playoffs in consecutive years with the Blackhawks winning the first two, both in the second round in six games. Vancouver won the opening three games of the series before Chicago responded by winning the next three games to force a game seven. Alexandre Burrows scored the winning goal in game 7 in overtime on Blackhawks' goaltender Corey Crawford to clinch the 2–1 victory in the game and 4–3 series victory.

Vancouver moved on to play the fifth-seeded Nashville Predators in the second round of the playoffs. It is the first time the two teams had met in the playoffs. Vancouver won the first game before Nashville won game two to even up the series at one. Vancouver won both games in Nashville, Game 3 3–2 in overtime on a Ryan Kesler deflection goal and 4–2 in Game 4, respectively. The series returned to Vancouver for Game 5 with the Canucks having a 3–1 series lead, where the Predators staved off elimination by beating the Canucks 4–3 and Predators' forward Joel Ward scored two goals, including the game winner to force a game six. The Canucks won the series 4–2 after a 2–1 victory in Game 6 in Nashville to clinch their first Western Conference Final appearance since 1994.

The Canucks played the second-seeded San Jose Sharks for the first time ever in the Western Conference Final after San Jose eliminated the third-seeded Detroit Red Wings in Game 7. Vancouver prevailed in five games with a double overtime goal scored by defenceman Kevin Bieksa in Game 5 in Vancouver to send the Canucks to the Stanley Cup Final for the third time in franchise history and the first time since 1994.

They would face the third-seeded Boston Bruins after Boston defeated the fifth-seeded Tampa Bay Lightning in seven games in the Eastern Conference Final. The series began on June 1 with a 1–0 Canucks victory. Roberto Luongo picked up his third shutout of the playoffs while forward Raffi Torres scored the dramatic lone goal with 18.5 seconds remaining in the third period. However, after Game 1, the series became heated and physical, after Alexandre Burrows apparently bit the finger of Bruins' forward Patrice Bergeron during game one (after the incident was reviewed by the league Burrows was not suspended) and in Game 3, a hit by defenceman Aaron Rome left Bruins winger Nathan Horton concussed and unable to play for the rest of the series. Despite playing without Horton – one of the Bruins best goal scorers – for the final four games of the series, Boston was able to pick up their play and comeback to win the series in seven despite staking Vancouver leads of 2–0 and 3–2. It was Boston's first Stanley Cup victory in 39 years. The Canucks became the first team to lose in the Finals after winning the Presidents' Trophy since the Detroit Red Wings in 1995. The Canucks 54 wins was the most by a team that lost in the Stanley Cup Finals, surpassing the previous record of 53 by the Philadelphia Flyers in 1985 and 117 points was the most by a team that lost in the final, surpassing the previous record of 116 by the Flyers in 1980.

=== Broadcast changes ===
==== Television ====
On July 28, 2010, the Vancouver Canucks announced a new partnership with Rogers Sportsnet One, a new national sports channel with regional broadcast capabilities. The new partnership included 13 additional games, on top of the 45 on Rogers Sportsnet Pacific, to be shown thus eliminating Canucks TV Pay-Per-View. In addition, CBC Hockey Night in Canada announced that it would once again be showing 14 games nationally while TSN would show 10 games.

==== Radio ====
Also on July 28, 2010, Tom Larscheid announced that he would be retiring at the start of the season. His final radio call was during the Vancouver Canucks season opener against the Los Angeles Kings on October 9. He spent 33 years as the colour commentator for the Vancouver Canucks and was replaced by Dave Tomlinson.

== Schedule and results ==
=== Pre-season ===
2010 pre-season game log: 3–5–0 (Home: 2–2–0; Road: 1–3–0)
#	Date	Visitor	Score	Home	OT	Decision	Attendance	Record
1	September 21	Vancouver	2–3	Calgary		Weiman	19,289	0–1–0
2	September 21	Calgary	3–1	Vancouver		Shantz	18,860	0–2–0
3	September 22	Edmonton	3–2	Vancouver		Schneider	18,860	0–3–0
4	September 25	Anaheim	1–4	Vancouver		Luongo	18,860	1–3–0
5	September 26	Vancouver	2–8	Edmonton		Schneider	16,839	1–4–0
6	September 28	San Jose	1–3	Vancouver		Schneider	18,860	2–4–0
7	September 29	Vancouver	2–6	San Jose		Lack	16,106	2–5–0
8	October 1	Vancouver	4–2	Anaheim		Schneider	14,235	3–5–0

=== Regular season ===
2010–11 game log

October: 4–3–2 (Home: 4–0–1; Road: 0–3–1)
#	Date	Visitor	Score	Home	OT	Decision	Attendance	Record	Pts
1	October 9	Los Angeles	2–1	Vancouver	SO	Luongo	18,860	0–0–1	1
2	October 11	Florida	1–2	Vancouver		Luongo	18,860	1–0–1	3
3	October 13	Vancouver	3–4	Anaheim		Luongo	17,174	1–1–1	3
4	October 15	Vancouver	1–4	Los Angeles		Luongo	18,118	1–2–1	3
5	October 17	Carolina	1–5	Vancouver		Schneider	18,860	2–2–1	5
6	October 19	Vancouver	2–6	Minnesota		Luongo	16,806	2–3–1	5
7	October 20	Vancouver	1–2	Chicago	SO	Luongo	20,859	2–3–2	6
8	October 22	Minnesota	1–5	Vancouver		Schneider	18,860	3–3–2	8
9	October 26	Colorado	3–4	Vancouver	OT	Loungo	18,860	4–3–2	10

November: 8–4–1 (Home: 4–2–0; Road: 4–2–1)
#	Date	Visitor	Score	Home	OT	Decision	Attendance	Record	Pts
10	November 1	New Jersey	0–3	Vancouver		Luongo	18,860	5–3–2	12
11	November 2	Vancouver	4–3	Edmonton		Luongo	16,839	6–3–2	14
12	November 4	Vancouver	3–1	Colorado		Schneider	12,732	7–3–2	16
13	November 6	Detroit	4–6	Vancouver		Luongo	18,860	8–3–2	18
14	November 9	Vancouver	0–2	Montreal		Luongo	21,273	8–4–2	18
15	November 11	Vancouver	6–2	Ottawa		Luongo	19,191	9–4–2	20
16	November 13	Vancouver	5–3	Toronto		Luongo	19,534	10–4–2	22
17	November 15	Vancouver	3–4	Buffalo	OT	Schneider	18,690	10–4–3	23
18	November 17	Vancouver	1–3	Pittsburgh		Luongo	18,252	10–5–3	23
19	November 20	Chicago	7–1	Vancouver		Luongo	18,860	10–6–3	23
20	November 21	Phoenix	3–2	Vancouver		Luongo	18,860	10–7–3	23
21	November 24	Colorado	2–4	Vancouver		Luongo	18,860	11–7–3	25
22	November 26	San Jose	1–6	Vancouver		Luongo	18,860	12–7–3	27

December: 11–1–2 (Home: 5–1–1; Road: 6–0–1)
#	Date	Visitor	Score	Home	OT	Decision	Attendance	Record	Pts
23	December 1	Vancouver	7–2	Calgary		Luongo	19,289	13–7–3	29
24	December 3	Vancouver	3–0	Chicago		Luongo	21,737	14–7–3	31
25	December 5	St. Louis	3–2	Vancouver		Luongo	18,860	14–8–3	31
26	December 8	Anaheim	4–5	Vancouver	SO	Luongo	18,860	15–8–3	33
27	December 11	Tampa Bay	5–4	Vancouver	OT	Schneider	18,860	15–8–4	34
28	December 12	Vancouver	2–1	Edmonton		Luongo	16,839	16–8–4	36
29	December 15	Columbus	2–3	Vancouver	OT	Luongo	18,860	17–8–4	38
30	December 18	Toronto	1–4	Vancouver		Luongo	18,860	18–8–4	40
31	December 20	Vancouver	3–1	St. Louis		Luongo	19,150	19–8–4	42
32	December 22	Vancouver	4–5	Detroit	OT	Luongo	20,066	19–8–5	43
33	December 23	Vancouver	7–3	Columbus		Schneider	12,159	20–8–5	45
34	December 26	Edmonton	2–3	Vancouver		Schneider	18,860	21–8–5	47
35	December 28	Philadelphia	2–6	Vancouver		Luongo	18,860	22–8–5	49
36	December 31	Vancouver	4–1	Dallas		Schneider	17,773	23–8–5	51

January: 8–2–4 (Home: 4–0–3; Road: 4–2–1)
#	Date	Visitor	Score	Home	OT	Decision	Attendance	Record	Pts
37	January 2	Vancouver	2–1	Colorado		Luongo	15,323	24–8–5	53
38	January 3	Vancouver	4–3	San Jose		Schneider	17,562	25–8–5	55
39	January 5	Calgary	1–3	Vancouver		Luongo	18,860	26–8–5	57
40	January 7	Edmonton	1–6	Vancouver		Schneider	18,860	27–8–5	59
41	January 8	Detroit	2–1	Vancouver	SO	Luongo	18,860	27–8–6	60
42	January 11	Vancouver	4–3	NY Islanders	SO	Luongo	8,913	28–8–6	62
43	January 13	Vancouver	0–1	NY Rangers		Schneider	18,200	28–9–6	62
44	January 14	Vancouver	4–2	Washington		Luongo	18,398	29–9–6	64
45	January 16	Vancouver	0–4	Minnesota		Schneider	18,458	29–10–6	64
46	January 18	Vancouver	3–4	Colorado	OT	Luongo	12,791	29–10–7	65
47	January 20	San Jose	2–1	Vancouver	SO	Luongo	18,860	29–10–8	66
48	January 22	Calgary	4–3	Vancouver	SO	Luongo	18,860	29–10–9	67
49	January 24	Dallas	1–7	Vancouver		Luongo	18,860	30–10–9	69
50	January 26	Nashville	1–2	Vancouver		Luongo	18,860	31–10–9	71

February: 8–5–0 (Home: 5–3–0; Road: 3–2–0)
#	Date	Visitor	Score	Home	OT	Decision	Attendance	Record	Pts
51	February 1	Vancouver	4–1	Dallas		Schneider	12,884	32–10–9	73
52	February 2	Vancouver	6–0	Phoenix		Luongo	13,157	33–10–9	75
53	February 4	Chicago	3–4	Vancouver		Luongo	18,860	34–10–9	77
54	February 7	Ottawa	2–4	Vancouver		Luongo	18,860	35–10–9	79
55	February 9	Anaheim	4–3	Vancouver		Schneider	18,860	35–11–9	79
56	February 12	Calgary	2–4	Vancouver		Luongo	18,860	36–11–9	81
57	February 14	Vancouver	2–3	St. Louis		Luongo	19,150	36–12–9	81
58	February 15	Vancouver	4–1	Minnesota		Schneider	18,106	37–12–9	83
59	February 17	Vancouver	1–3	Nashville		Luongo	15,337	37–13–9	83
60	February 19	Dallas	2–5	Vancouver		Luongo	18,860	38–13–9	85
61	February 22	Montreal	3–2	Vancouver		Luongo	18,860	38–14–9	85
62	February 24	St. Louis	2–3	Vancouver		Schneider	18,860	39–14–9	87
63	February 26	Boston	3–1	Vancouver		Luongo	18,860	39–15–9	87

March: 13–2–0 (Home: 4–2–0; Road: 9–0–0)
#	Date	Visitor	Score	Home	OT	Decision	Attendance	Record	Pts
64	March 1	Columbus	1–2	Vancouver	SO	Luongo	18,860	40–15–9	89
65	March 3	Nashville	3–0	Vancouver		Luongo	18,860	40–16–9	89
66	March 5	Vancouver	3–1	Los Angeles		Luongo	18,118	41–16–9	91
67	March 6	Vancouver	3–0	Anaheim		Schneider	16,356	42–16–9	93
68	March 8	Vancouver	4–3	Phoenix	OT	Luongo	12,843	43–16–9	95
69	March 10	Vancouver	5–4	San Jose	SO	Schneider	17,562	44–16–9	97
70	March 12	Vancouver	4–3	Calgary		Luongo	19,289	45–16–9	99
71	March 14	Minnesota	2–4	Vancouver		Luongo	18,860	46–16–9	101
72	March 16	Colorado	2–4	Vancouver		Schneider	18,860	47–16–9	103
73	March 18	Phoenix	3–1	Vancouver		Luongo	18,860	47–17–9	103
74	March 23	Vancouver	2–1	Detroit		Luongo	20,066	48–17–9	105
75	March 25	Vancouver	3–1	Atlanta		Luongo	16,237	49–17–9	107
76	March 27	Vancouver	4–1	Columbus		Schneider	14,469	50–17–9	109
77	March 29	Vancouver	3–1	Nashville		Luongo	15,960	51–17–9	111
78	March 31	Los Angeles	1–3	Vancouver		Luongo	18,860	52–17–9	113

April: 2–2–0 (Home: 1–1–0; Road: 1–1–0)
#	Date	Visitor	Score	Home	OT	Decision	Attendance	Record	Pts
79	April 2	Edmonton	4–1	Vancouver		Schneider	18,860	52–18–9	113
80	April 5	Vancouver	0–2	Edmonton		Luongo	16,839	52–19–9	113
81	April 7	Minnesota	0–5	Vancouver		Luongo	18,860	53–19–9	115
82	April 9	Vancouver	3–2	Calgary	OT	Schneider	19,289	54–19–9	117

Legend: Win (2 points) Loss (0 points) Overtime/shootout loss (1 point)

=== Playoffs ===
The Vancouver Canucks clinched their first Presidents' Trophy in franchise history, thus guaranteeing themselves home ice advantage for the duration of the playoffs.

2011 Stanley Cup playoffs

Western Conference quarterfinal vs. (8) Chicago Blackhawks: Vancouver won series 4–3
#	Date	Visitor	Score	Home	OT	Decision	Attendance	Series	Recap
1	April 13	Chicago	0–2	Vancouver		Luongo	18,860	1–0	Recap
2	April 15	Chicago	3–4	Vancouver		Luongo	18,860	2–0	Recap
3	April 17	Vancouver	3–2	Chicago		Luongo	21,743	3–0	Recap
4	April 19	Vancouver	2–7	Chicago		Luongo	21,757	3–1	Recap
5	April 21	Chicago	5–0	Vancouver		Luongo	18,860	3–2	Recap
6	April 24	Vancouver	3–4	Chicago	OT	Schneider	22,014	3–3	Recap
7	April 26	Chicago	1–2	Vancouver	OT	Luongo	18,860	4–3	Recap

Western Conference semi-final vs. (5) Nashville Predators: Vancouver won series 4–2
#	Date	Visitor	Score	Home	OT	Decision	Attendance	Series	Recap
1	April 28	Nashville	0–1	Vancouver		Luongo	18,860	1–0	Recap
2	April 30	Nashville	2–1	Vancouver	2OT	Luongo	18,860	1–1	Recap
3	May 3	Vancouver	3–2	Nashville	OT	Luongo	17,113	2–1	Recap
4	May 5	Vancouver	4–2	Nashville		Luongo	17,113	3–1	Recap
5	May 7	Nashville	4–3	Vancouver		Luongo	18,860	3–2	Recap
6	May 9	Vancouver	2–1	Nashville		Luongo	17,113	4–2	Recap

Western Conference final vs. (2) San Jose Sharks: Vancouver won series 4–1
#	Date	Visitor	Score	Home	OT	Decision	Attendance	Series	Recap
1	May 15	San Jose	2–3	Vancouver		Luongo	18,860	1–0	Recap
2	May 18	San Jose	3–7	Vancouver		Luongo	18,860	2–0	Recap
3	May 20	Vancouver	3–4	San Jose		Luongo	17,562	2–1	Recap
4	May 22	Vancouver	4–2	San Jose		Luongo	17,562	3–1	Recap
5	May 24	San Jose	2–3	Vancouver	2OT	Luongo	18,860	4–1	Recap

Stanley Cup Final vs. (E3) Boston Bruins: Vancouver lost series 4–3
#	Date	Visitor	Score	Home	OT	Decision	Attendance	Series	Recap
1	June 1	Boston	0–1	Vancouver		Luongo	18,860	1–0	Recap
2	June 4	Boston	2–3	Vancouver	OT	Luongo	18,860	2–0	Recap
3	June 6	Vancouver	1–8	Boston		Luongo	17,565	2–1	Recap
4	June 8	Vancouver	0–4	Boston		Luongo	17,565	2–2	Recap
5	June 10	Boston	0–1	Vancouver		Luongo	18,860	3–2	Recap
6	June 13	Vancouver	2–5	Boston		Luongo	17,565	3–3	Recap
7	June 15	Boston	4–0	Vancouver		Luongo	18,860	3–4	Recap

Legend: Win Loss

== Standings ==
=== Divisional standings ===
Northwest Division
		GP	W	L	OTL	ROW	GF	GA	Pts
**1**	**p-Vancouver Canucks**	**82**	**54**	**19**	**9**	**50**	**262**	**185**	**117**
2	Calgary Flames	82	41	29	12	32	250	237	94
3	Minnesota Wild	82	39	35	8	36	206	233	86
4	Colorado Avalanche	82	30	44	8	24	227	288	68
5	Edmonton Oilers	82	25	45	12	23	193	269	62

=== Conference standings ===
Western Conference
R		Div	GP	W	L	OTL	ROW	GF	GA	Pts
**1**	**p – Vancouver Canucks**	**NW**	**82**	**54**	**19**	**9**	**50**	**262**	**185**	117
**2**	**y – San Jose Sharks**	**PA**	**82**	**48**	**25**	**9**	**43**	**248**	**213**	105
**3**	**y – Detroit Red Wings**	**CE**	**82**	**47**	**25**	**10**	**43**	**261**	**241**	104
**4**	**Anaheim Ducks**	**PA**	**82**	**47**	**30**	**5**	**43**	**239**	**235**	99
**5**	**Nashville Predators**	**CE**	**82**	**44**	**27**	**11**	**38**	**219**	**194**	99
**6**	**Phoenix Coyotes**	**PA**	**82**	**43**	**26**	**13**	**38**	**231**	**226**	99
**7**	**Los Angeles Kings**	**PA**	**82**	**46**	**30**	**6**	**36**	**219**	**198**	98
**8**	**Chicago Blackhawks**	**CE**	**82**	**44**	**29**	**9**	**38**	**258**	**225**	97
8.5
9	Dallas Stars	PA	82	42	29	11	37	227	233	95
10	Calgary Flames	NW	82	41	29	12	32	250	237	94
11	St. Louis Blues	CE	82	38	33	11	34	240	234	87
12	Minnesota Wild	NW	82	39	35	8	36	206	233	86
13	Columbus Blue Jackets	CE	82	34	35	13	29	215	258	81
14	Colorado Avalanche	NW	82	30	44	8	24	227	288	68
15	Edmonton Oilers	NW	82	25	45	12	23	193	269	62

bold – qualified for playoffs; y – Won division; p – Won President's Trophy (best record in NHL)
CE – Central Division, NW – Northwest Division, PA – Pacific Division

== Player statistics ==
=== Skaters ===
Note: GP = Games played; G = Goals; A = Assists; Pts = Points; +/− = Plus/minus; PIM = Penalty minutes

Regular season

Player	GP	G	A	Pts	+/−	PIM
Daniel Sedin	82	41	63	104	+30	32
Henrik Sedin	82	19	75	94	+26	40
Ryan Kesler	82	41	32	73	+24	66
Mikael Samuelsson	75	18	32	50	+8	36
Christian Ehrhoff	79	14	36	50	+19	52
Alexandre Burrows	72	26	22	48	+26	77
Mason Raymond	70	15	24	39	+8	10
Alexander Edler	51	8	25	33	+13	24
Manny Malhotra	72	11	19	30	+9	22
Raffi Torres	80	14	15	29	+4	78
Jannik Hansen	82	9	20	29	+13	32
Dan Hamhuis	64	6	17	23	+29	34
Kevin Bieksa	66	6	16	22	+32	73
Jeff Tambellini	62	9	8	17	+10	18
Tanner Glass	73	3	7	10	−5	72
Sami Salo	27	3	4	7	−3	14
Keith Ballard	65	2	5	7	+10	53
Andrew Alberts	42	1	6	7	0	41
Chris Higgins^{†}	14	2	3	5	0	6
Aaron Rome	56	1	4	5	+1	53
Alexandre Bolduc	24	2	2	4	+1	21
Victor Oreskovich	16	0	3	3	+1	8
Lee Sweatt	3	1	1	2	+4	2
Cody Hodgson	8	1	1	2	+1	0
Aaron Volpatti	15	1	1	2	−1	16
Peter Schaefer	16	1	1	2	−3	2
Sergei Shirokov	2	1	0	1	+1	0
Mario Bliznak	4	1	0	1	+1	0
Maxim Lapierre^{†}	19	1	0	1	−1	8
Rick Rypien	9	0	1	1	−5	31
Christopher Tanev	29	0	1	1	0	0
Evan Oberg^{‡}	2	0	0	0	0	0
Jonas Andersson	4	0	0	0	+1	0
Ryan Parent	4	0	0	0	−3	0
Yann Sauve	5	0	0	0	−2	0
Joel Perrault^{‡}	7	0	0	0	−1	0
Guillaume Desbiens	12	0	0	0	−3	10

Playoffs

Player	GP	G	A	Pts	+/−	PIM
Henrik Sedin	25	3	19	22	−11	16
Daniel Sedin	25	9	11	20	−9	32
Ryan Kesler	25	7	12	19	0	47
Alexandre Burrows	25	9	8	17	0	34
Christian Ehrhoff	23	2	10	12	−13	16
Alexander Edler	25	2	9	11	−4	8
Kevin Bieksa	25	5	5	10	6	51
Jannik Hansen	25	3	6	9	7	18
Chris Higgins	25	4	4	8	1	2
Mason Raymond	24	2	6	8	−1	6
Raffi Torres	23	3	4	7	2	28
Dan Hamhuis	19	1	5	6	5	6
Maxim Lapierre	25	3	2	5	2	66
Sami Salo	21	3	2	5	−4	2
Mikael Samuelsson	11	1	2	3	−4	8
Aaron Rome	14	1	0	1	3	37
Cody Hodgson	12	0	1	1	−4	2
Tanner Glass	20	0	0	0	−5	18
Victor Oreskovich	19	0	0	0	−6	12
Keith Ballard	10	0	0	0	−4	6
Andrew Alberts	9	0	0	0	−8	6
Manny Malhotra	6	0	0	0	−1	0
Jeff Tambellini	6	0	0	0	−3	2
Christopher Tanev	5	0	0	0	0	0
Alexandre Bolduc	3	0	0	0	0	0

=== Goaltenders ===
Note: GP = Games played; TOI = Time on ice (minutes); W = Wins; L = Losses; OT = Overtime losses; GA = Goals against; GAA= Goals against average; SA= Shots against; Sv% = Save percentage; SO= Shutouts

Regular season

Player	GP	Min	W	L	OT	GA	GAA	SA	Sv%	SO
Roberto Luongo	60	3,590	38	15	7	126	2.11	1753	.928	4
Cory Schneider	25	1,372	16	4	2	51	2.23	714	.929	1

Playoffs

Player	GP	Min	W	L	GA	GAA	SA	Sv%	SO
Roberto Luongo	25	1427	15	10	61	2.56	711	.914	4
Cory Schneider	5	163	0	0	7	2.58	82	.915	0

^{†}Denotes player spent time with another team before joining Canucks. Stats reflect time with Canucks only.
^{‡}Traded mid-season. Stats reflect time with Canucks only.

== Awards and records ==
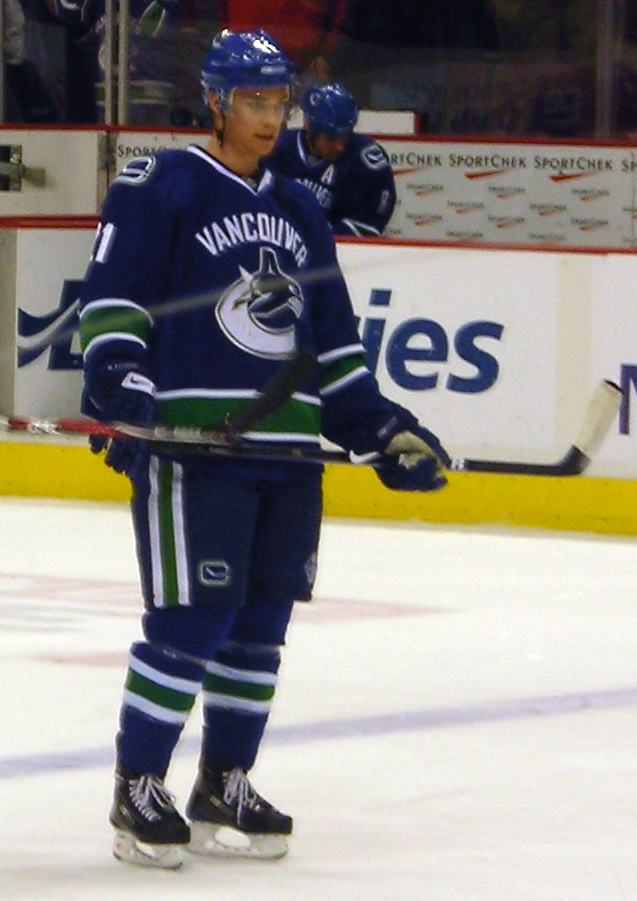
Mason Raymond registered his 100th career point in October 2010.

=== Records ===
Regular season
Player	Record	Awarded
Vancouver Canucks	Most points in 2010–11 season – 117	March 25, 2011
Vancouver Canucks	Most road victories in 2010–11 season – 24	March 25, 2011
Vancouver Canucks	Most wins in 2010–11 season – 50	March 27, 2011
Vancouver Canucks	Longest road winning streak in 2010–11 season – 9	March 29, 2011

=== Milestones ===
Regular season
Player	Milestone	Reached
Mason Raymond	100th career point	October 17, 2010
Raffi Torres	100th career goal	October 22, 2010
Raffi Torres	1st career hat trick	November 2, 2010
Kevin Bieksa	100th career assist	November 2, 2010
Mario Bliznak	1st career goal 1st career point	November 11, 2010
Ryan Kesler	100th career goal	November 24, 2010
Mason Raymond	2nd career hat trick	December 1, 2010
Dan Hamhuis	500th career game	December 5, 2010
Ryan Kesler	1st career hat trick	December 15, 2010
Aaron Volpatti	1st career game	December 18, 2010
Aaron Volpatti	1st career goal 1st career point	December 20, 2010
Alexandre Bolduc	1st career goal	January 2, 2011
Daniel Sedin	10,000th franchise goal	January 5, 2011
Ryan Kesler	2nd career hat trick	January 7, 2011
Aaron Rome	100th career game	January 13, 2011
Alexandre Burrows	100th career assist	January 14, 2011
Alexander Edler	100th career assist	January 18, 2011
Sergei Shirokov	1st career goal 1st career point	January 18, 2011
Christopher Tanev	1st career game	January 18, 2011
Christopher Tanev	1st career assist 1st career point	January 24, 2011
Aaron Volpatti	1st career assist	January 24, 2011
Lee Sweatt	1st career game 1st career goal 1st career point	January 26, 2011
Cody Hodgson	1st career game	February 1, 2011
Cody Hodgson	1st career goal 1st career point	February 2, 2011
Lee Sweatt	1st career assist	February 2, 2011
Cody Hodgson	1st career assist	February 4, 2011
Alexandre Burrows	100th career goal	February 9, 2011
Yann Sauve	1st career game	February 15, 2011
Manny Malhotra	100th career goal	March 6, 2011
Cory Schneider	1st career shutout	March 6, 2011
Raffi Torres	500th career game	March 8, 2011
Henrik Sedin	500th career assist	March 12, 2011
Ryan Kesler	3rd career hat trick	April 7, 2011
Christian Ehrhoff	500th career game	April 9, 2011

=== Awards ===
Regular season
Player	Award	Awarded
Raffi Torres	NHL First Star of the Week	November 8, 2010
Roberto Luongo	NHL Second Star of the Month	December 2010
Daniel Sedin	NHL First Star of the Week	January 10, 2011
Mikael Samuelsson	NHL Second Star of the Week	February 7, 2011
Daniel Sedin	NHL Second Star of the Week	March 14, 2011
Daniel Sedin	NHL Second Star of the Month	March 2011
Christian Ehrhoff	Babe Pratt Trophy winner	April 7, 2011
Daniel Sedin	Cyclone Taylor Trophy winner	April 7, 2011
Daniel Sedin	Cyrus H. McLean Trophy winner	April 7, 2011
Jannik Hansen	Fred J. Hume Award winner	April 7, 2011
Roberto Luongo	Molson Cup winner	April 7, 2011
Ryan Kesler	Most Exciting Player Award winner	April 7, 2011
Daniel Sedin	Art Ross Trophy winner	April 10, 2011
Roberto Luongo; Cory Schneider	William M. Jennings Trophy winner	April 10, 2011
Ryan Kesler	Frank J. Selke Trophy winner	June 22, 2011
Mike Gillis	GM of the Year winner	June 22, 2011
Daniel Sedin	Ted Lindsay Award winner	June 22, 2011

== Draft picks ==
Vancouver's picks at the 2010 NHL entry draft in Los Angeles.

Round	#	Player	Nationality	College/junior/club team (League)
4	115	Patrick McNally	United States	Milton Academy (USHS-MA)
5	145	Adam Polasek	Czech Republic	P.E.I. Rocket (QMJHL)
6	172^{1}	Alex Friesen	Canada	Niagara IceDogs (OHL)
6	175	Jonathan Iilahti	Finland	Espoo Blues (SM-liiga)
7	205	Sawyer Hannay	Canada	Halifax Mooseheads (QMJHL)

^1 This draft pick originally belonged to the Phoenix Coyotes. It was acquired from Phoenix in exchange for Mathieu Schneider.

== Transactions ==
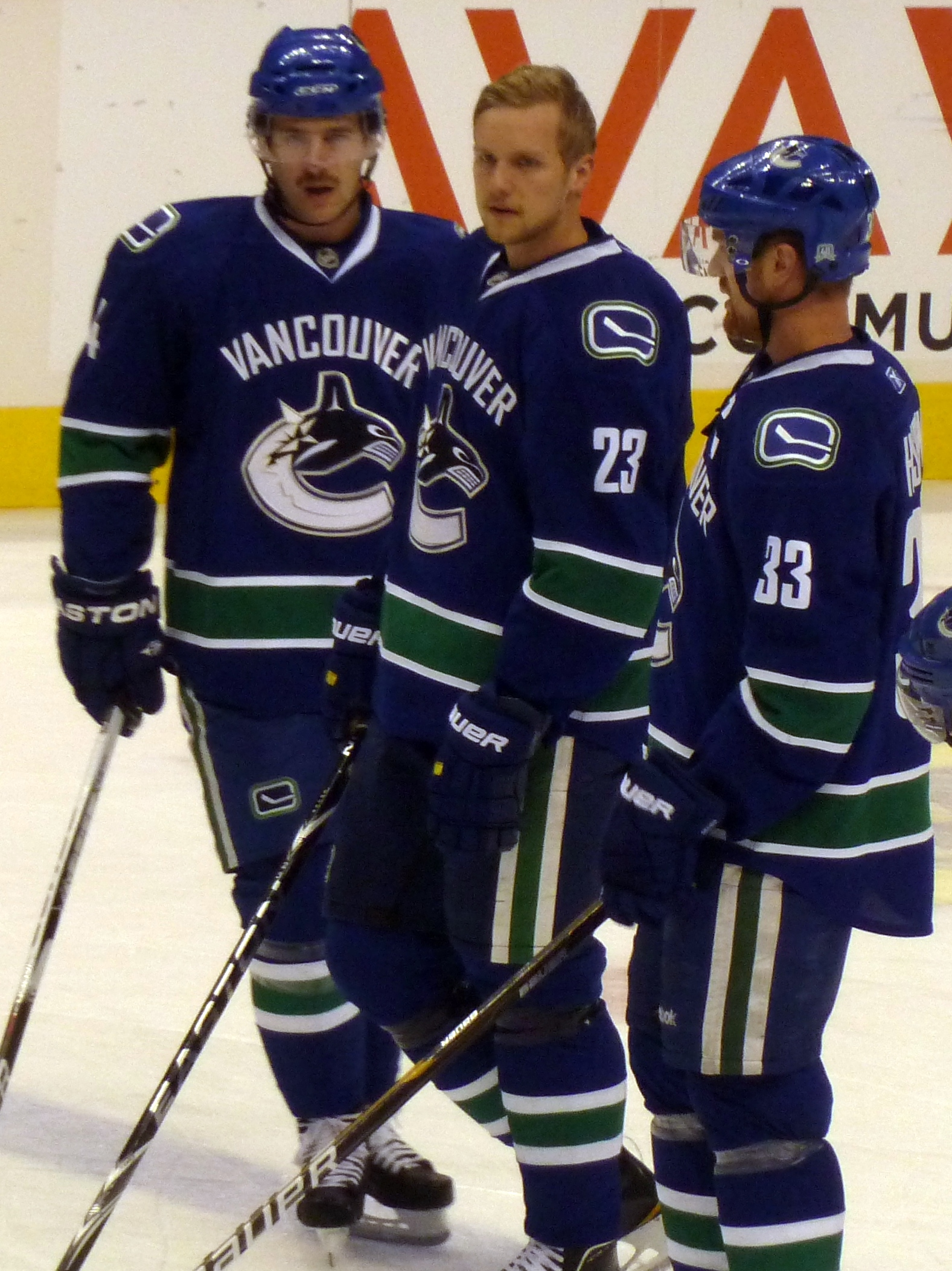
Keith Ballard (left) stands with Canucks teammates Alexander Edler (center) and Henrik Sedin (right). Ballard was acquired in a draft day deal with the Florida Panthers.

=== Trades ===
February 28, 2011	To Vancouver Canucks Maxim Lapierre; MacGregor Sharp	To Anaheim Ducks Joel Perrault; 3rd-round pick in 2012 – Frederik Andersen
February 28, 2011	To Vancouver Canucks Chris Higgins	To Florida Panthers Evan Oberg; 3rd-round pick in 2013 (Note: Pick later traded back to Vancouver Canucks.) – Cole Cassels
October 7, 2010	To Vancouver Canucks Nathan Paetsch	To Florida Panthers Sean Zimmerman
October 6, 2010	To Vancouver Canucks Andrew Peters	To Florida Panthers Darcy Hordichuk
October 5, 2010	To Vancouver Canucks Ryan Parent; Jonas Andersson	To Nashville Predators Shane O'Brien; Dan Gendur
June 25, 2010	To Vancouver Canucks Keith Ballard; Victor Oreskovich	To Florida Panthers Steve Bernier; Michael Grabner; 1st-round pick in 2010 – Quinton Howden

=== Players retained ===
Player	Contract terms
Mario Bliznak	1 year, $550,000
Mason Raymond	2 years, $5.1 million
Jannik Hansen	1 year, $825,000
Sean Zimmerman	1 year, $500,000
Tanner Glass	1 year, $625,000
Shane O'Brien	1 year, $1.6 million
Alexandre Bolduc	1 year, $500,000
Cory Schneider	2 years, $1.8 million
Aaron Rome	2 years, $1.5 million

=== Free agents acquired ===
Player	Former team	Contract terms
Darren Archibald	Free agent	3 years
Peter Schaefer	Free agent	1 year, $600,000
Raffi Torres	Buffalo Sabres	1 year, $1 million
Bill Sweatt	Colorado College (NCAA)	3 years, $2.7 million
Tyler Weiman	Colorado Avalanche	1 year, $500,000
Jeff Tambellini	New York Islanders	1 year, $500,000
Dan Hamhuis	Nashville Predators	6 years, $27 million
Manny Malhotra	San Jose Sharks	3 years, $7.5 million
Joel Perrault	Phoenix Coyotes	1 year, $510,000
Lee Sweatt	TPS (SM-liiga)	1 year, $650,000
Christopher Tanev	Rochester Institute of Technology (Atlantic Hockey)	3 years, $2.7 million
Eddie Lack	Brynäs IF (Elitserien)	2 years, $1.8 million

=== Free agents lost ===
Player	New team	Contract terms
Ryan Johnson	Chicago Blackhawks	1 year, $500,000
Kyle Wellwood	Atlant Moscow Oblast (KHL)	1 year, $1 million
Willie Mitchell	Los Angeles Kings	2 years, $7 million
Matt Pettinger	Kölner Haie (DEL)	Unknown
Brad Lukowich	Dallas Stars	1 year, $1 million
Pavol Demitra	Lokomotiv Yaroslavl (KHL)	1 year
Nathan McIver	Boston Bruins	2 years, $1.025 million
Andrew Raycroft	Dallas Stars	2 years, $1.3 million

== Farm teams ==
- The Manitoba Moose will remain the Canucks' American Hockey League affiliate for the 2010–11 season.
- The Victoria Salmon Kings will remain the Canucks' ECHL affiliate for the 2010–11 season.

== See also ==
- 2010–11 NHL season
