= Dan Murphy (sportscaster) =

Canadian sportscaster (born 1970)

James Dan Murphy (born May 6, 1970 in Abbotsford, British Columbia) is a Canadian sportscaster, who currently works for Rogers Sportsnet as host of Vancouver Canucks television broadcasts and occasionally as a rinkside reporter on NHL on Sportsnet or Hockey Night in Canada broadcasts. He graduated from MEI Secondary in Abbotsford in 1988. He is Roman Catholic.

After graduating from the University of Ottawa with a degree in Communications in 1992, Murphy attended BCIT’s Broadcast Journalism program where he graduated in 1995. He quickly got his start in television when he joined Sports Page in Vancouver where he worked as a writer/reporter/producer from 1995 to 1999. Murphy was then hired as a reporter by Sportsnet in November 1999 and hosted Vancouver Grizzlies NBA broadcasts on Sportsnet and VTV during the 2000–01 season before joining Canucks telecasts the following season.
