= TWU Titans =

Hockey club for Trinity Western University in British Columbia, Canada

Trinity Western University Titans
- Founded: 1990
- Home arena: Langley Twin Rinks
- City: (Canada) Langley, British Columbia
- Team colors: Gold & blue
- Media: Trinity Western University, Mars' Hill
- General manager: (Canada) Claire Dyke
- Head coach: (Canada) Chuck MacKnee
- Captain: (Canada) Benton Nickel
- Minor league affiliates: Trinity Western University Bombers

The Trinity Western University Titans is a hockey club that once represented Trinity Western University in the British Columbia Intercollegiate Hockey League. In 2010, the Titans came under the umbrella of the Trinity Western Spartans athletic department and has since been a Spartans varsity team playing in the British Columbia Intercollegiate Hockey League.

== Early years ==
Before the formation of the British Columbia Intercollegiate Hockey League (BCIHL), the Titans were in a contact church hockey league (in the 1990s) with some big Vancouver, Surrey, and Abbotsford churches, along with Columbia Bible College. They were known as the Wolverines during this era. During this time, the Titans won several regular season championships but were essentially a club team. Later on, the Titans played in the Fraser Valley Contact Hockey League (FVCHL) with Athletes in Action, the Sabres (a Trinity Western University Alumni team), a team from Whiterock, Columbia Bible College, Delphi Academy, and a couple of other teams. The Titans finally won the league playoff championship in 1999. As time went on, and interest grew in intercollegiate play, the Titans began having intercollegiate tournaments with University of Northern British Columbia, The University College of the Cariboo (now Thompson Rivers University), and Selkirk College while still competing in the FVCHL. In 2003, the FVCHL folded and the Titans began playing exhibition games with a mix of American and Canadian universities.

== 2006-present ==
As more universities in British Columbia got involved and committed, the BCIHL became formally formed in 2006. The Titans have hosted the BCIHL championships since 2003 and won titles in 2005 and 2006. After their last championship, the Titans saw a massive exodus of veterans. In fact, at the commence of the 2006-2007 season, the Titans only had six returning players As a result, the Titans have had a major youth movement in recent years, and have relied heavily on their young players over the course of the past few seasons.

== Slovakia Missions Trip 2008 ==
For the spring Reading Break in 2008, the Titans were overseas in Slovakia playing hockey and doing mission work with Athletes in Action.

On the trip, the Titans played five games against different Slovak Division II teams, most of which were stocked with junior and semi-professional players. These teams were highly skilled and boasted impressive skating and puck handling abilities. After each of their games, the Titans hosted the opposing team at a local restaurant and the Titan players shared their faith and spirituality and how Jesus Christ has worked within their lives. When the Titans were not on the ice, they were helping AIA Slovakia make connections with various groups and individuals.

In the first of their hockey games, the Titans were hosted by Bratislava Sport University, and eventually lost a very close game 4-2 at V. Dzurilla Winter Sports Stadium in Ružinov. They followed it up one night later with a 3-3 tie with ŽiarN.H.

It was not until their third game where the purpose of their trip started to evolve. Following an embarrassing 10-0 loss to Brezno, a game which had the hometown Brezno crowd of 500 chanting, "Brezno, Brezno!", after the hometeam scored their tenth, the Titans thought long and hard about what they were going through. They did a lot of personal and team soul-searching and seemed to reclaim the purpose for the trip. The Titans began to very seriously integrate their faith with the hockey that they were playing. As a result, TWU discovered true team spirit, and won their next two games 6-3 at Lučenec and 7-4 the following evening at Levice.

Overall, TWU's line of Brett Simmonds, Nathan Higgins from the NCAA's Wayne State Warriors, and Josh MacKnee led the way for the Titans offensively. Of the 18 goals scored by the team, the line scored 70 per cent of them. Higgins and MacKnee scored six each, while Simmonds added one and many assists.

The action away from the rink saw the Titans help three different churches with their youth group ministries, as well as teach English in three different middle and high schools. The team also led worship at two different Slovak churches and played floor hockey and other sports with different groups. The team also toured Vienna, visited castles and historical sites, and made a brief stop at Esztergom, Hungary where the team visited the Esztergom Basilica – the third largest church in Europe.

Goaltender Evan Menzies, who finished the overseas tour with a team best goals against average of 2.50, reflected on the outcome of his team's reading break: "The trip allowed us as a group to not only understand what love is, agape love, but to live it out to our teammates, and to the Slovak people. We learned that Christ's love is truly cross cultural and universal."

== Championship Teams ==
- 2007-2008 SFU Clansmen - Titans finished 4th
- 2006-2007 UVic Vikes - Titans finished 4th
- 2005-2006 TWU Titans
- 2004-2005 TWU Titans
- 2003-2004 UCC (now TRU) - Titans finished 2nd

== Legends ==
Over the course of the past five seasons, forward Josh MacKnee has led the Titans offensively four times:

Year	2003-2004	2004-2003	2005-2006	2006-2007	2007-2008
Games	25	26	23	0	9
Goals	23	29	23	0	10
Assists	25	30	27	0	5
Points	48	59	50	DNP	15

The most legendary line in recent memory was known as the "Green Line". Clark Moran centered Jamie Simpson and Mark Westergard.
