= Rick Ball =

Canadian sportscaster

- Education: British Columbia Institute of Technology
- Occupation: Sportscaster

Rick Ball (born 1966 or 1967) is a Canadian sportscaster who currently works as a hockey play-by-play announcer on Chicago Sports Network's Chicago Blackhawks broadcasts. Ball worked the Stanley Cup Playoffs for TNT in 2023.

A British Columbia Institute of Technology graduate, Ball began his radio career in 1993 in his native Kelowna. From 1995 to 2000 he was the play-by-play announcer for the Kelowna Rockets. He then worked for CFAX in Victoria, British Columbia. In 2001 he filled in for Jim Hughson on ten of VTV’s Vancouver Canucks broadcasts. That same year he joined The Team 1040 in Vancouver, where he hosted the noon-to-3 p.m. show. In 2004, The Team acquired the rights to the BC Lions and Ball was named the new play-by-play voice. In 2008, Ball and Joe Kenward were chosen as fill-in voices for lead Canucks announcer John Shorthouse. In 2011, the CBC chose Ball to call Winnipeg Jets games for Hockey Night In Canada. In 2013 he became the main western play-by-play voice for Hockey Night in Canada. In 2014, Ball left Vancouver to become Sportsnet's regional television announcer for the Calgary Flames. Ball joined Chicago Sports Network as the television play-by-play broadcaster of the Chicago Blackhawks in October 2024.
