= John Garrett (ice hockey) =

Canadian ice hockey player (1951–2026)

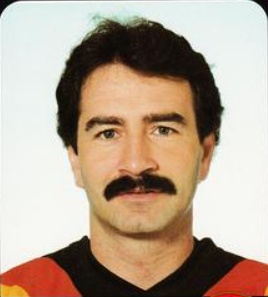
- Garrett on a 1983 card
- Born: June 17, 1951 Trenton, Ontario, Canada
- Died: April 27, 2026 (aged 74) Salt Lake City, Utah, U.S.
- Height: 5 ft 8 in (173 cm)
- Weight: 175 lb (79 kg; 12 st 7 lb)
- Position: Goaltender
- Caught: Left
- Played for: WHA; Minnesota Fighting Saints; Toronto Toros; Birmingham Bulls; New England Whalers; NHL; Hartford Whalers; Quebec Nordiques; Vancouver Canucks
- NHL draft: 38th overall, 1971; St. Louis Blues
- Playing career: 1971–1985

John Murdoch Garrett (June 17, 1951 – April 27, 2026) was a Canadian professional ice hockey goaltender and television sports commentator. He played in the World Hockey Association from 1973 to 1979 and then in the National Hockey League from 1979 to 1985. After retiring from playing he turned to broadcasting.

== Early life ==
John Murdoch Garrett was born on June 17, 1951, in Trenton, Ontario to a schoolteacher father and a stay-at-home mother. He grew up in a family of seven, struggling to afford hockey equipment. His mother cared for her father and her brother, who had been injured while serving in World War II and could not live on his own.

== Playing career ==
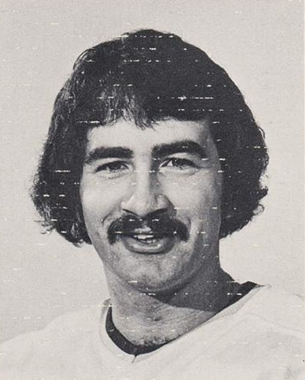
Garrett with the Minnesota Fighting Saints of the WHA, circa 1973–76

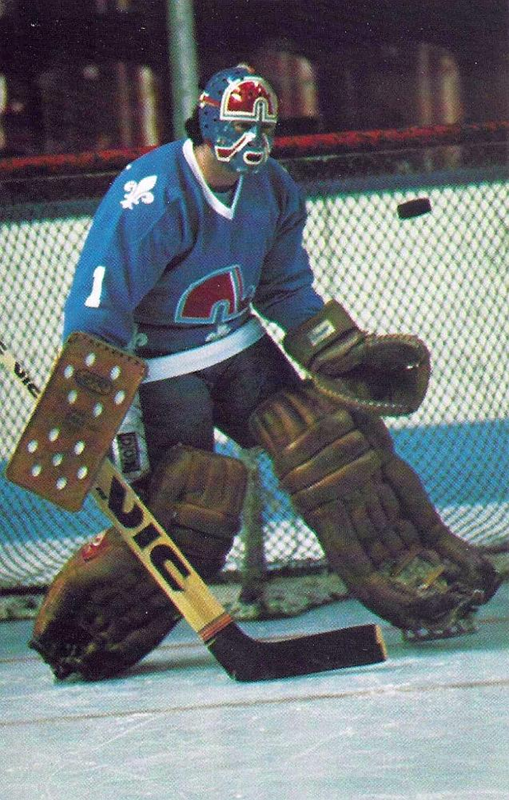
1983 postcard of Garrett for the Quebec Nordiques

Originally selected in the 1971 NHL entry draft by the St. Louis Blues, Garrett played one year for the Blues' Central Hockey League affiliate before joining the Portland Buckaroos of the Western Hockey League for half a season and then moving on to the Richmond Robins of the American Hockey League. He signed with the Minnesota Fighting Saints of the World Hockey Association in 1973–74. He would play with the Fighting Saints until the franchise folded on 25 February 1976. He then signed with the Toronto Toros, and would follow the Toros franchise when it relocated to Birmingham. In the final WHA season, Garrett was traded to the New England Whalers, and would remain with the franchise when it entered the NHL. He holds the record for the most losses by any goalie in WHA history. While playing for the Whalers, Garrett notably assisted on Gordie Howe's final goal, but went uncredited by the NHL for decades before the NHL retroactively awarded Garrett with the assist in 2025 after reviewing footage of the goal. Ron MacLean officially confirmed the NHL's addition of the assist during the 2025 Stanley Cup Final. Garrett would also play for the Quebec Nordiques and Vancouver Canucks of the NHL before retiring at the start of the 1985–86 season.

Garrett was involved in one of the oddest scenarios in the history of the NHL All-Star Game. Replacing an injured Richard Brodeur, the Vancouver Canucks' only representative at the All-Star Game that year, Garrett was voted the game's MVP before the end of the game. After Wayne Gretzky scored four times, a re-vote was held and Gretzky was named the All-Star Game MVP.

== Broadcasting career ==
Garrett's first broadcasting job was as an intermission analyst during the Stanley Cup playoffs while he was an active player. The Hartford Whalers had missed the playoffs and he was approached by CTV to work with Pat Burns on their playoff coverage. Garrett retired before the 1985–86 season. He had been offered the position of assistant general manager by Canucks' GM Harry Neale, but Neale was fired and the offer subsequently withdrawn. Garrett then began his broadcasting career in 1986–87. He worked as a colour commentator on CBC's Hockey Night in Canada. Within a few years, he was considered a valuable member of the team and was assigned his first conference final in 1991 — his first of eight in a row. During that time, he was also the lead colour commentator on Edmonton Oilers local telecasts, working along with Bruce Buchanan. He left CBC in 1998 to join the fledgling CTV Sportsnet (now Rogers Sportsnet). He worked as a studio analyst on national broadcasts, as well as the colour commentator for the Calgary Flames games on Sportsnet West. During the 1994–95 NHL Lockout, he briefly worked for United Parcel Service of Canada in Vancouver, British Columbia.

Beginning with the 2002–03 season, Garrett served as the colour commentator for Canucks games on Sportsnet Pacific, first being partnered with Jim Hughson and later John Shorthouse. He also had occasional network assignments on HNIC and, since Rogers acquired the Canadian national contract for the NHL in 2014, he sometimes got network assignments on either Sportsnet or City.

On March 23, 2023, Garrett announced his retirement from Canucks regional broadcasts at the conclusion of the 2022–23 NHL season. He planned to continue on Sportsnet's NHL coverage in a part-time capacity.

=== Nicknames ===
After the 1984-85 season, Garrett earned the nickname "Lotto" because his high goals-against average of 6.49 was the same as Canada's national lottery, Lotto 6/49.

Garrett picked up his "Cheech" nickname from teammate Rick Smith in the mid-seventies because his afro haircut and moustache resembled Cheech Marin from comedy duo Cheech and Chong.

== Personal life and death ==
Garrett was known throughout his broadcasting career for his obsession with ketchup. He credited his love for the sauce to his childhood, where his family was often unable to afford good food, but ketchup was "the sauce that made everything taste good."

While serving as backup to Dan Bouchard with the Quebec Nordiques, Garrett was caught with a hot dog stuffed into his pads during a relief appearance at the Colisée de Québec. The arena's layout placed the backup goaltender in a hallway behind the bench, out of sight of fans and cameras, and Garrett had accepted a hot dog from the team trainer during the game. When Bouchard skated off the ice in frustration after a goal against, Garrett was forced to enter the game without time to discreetly dispose of the food, and finished the contest with the hot dog still tucked into his equipment.

On April 27, 2026, Garrett was found dead in his hotel room in Salt Lake City, Utah at the age of 74. At the time of his death, he had been working as an analyst with Sportsnet for the Utah Mammoth and Vegas Golden Knights' first round matchup in the 2026 Stanley Cup playoffs.

== Career statistics ==
=== Regular season and playoffs ===
			Regular season									Playoffs
Season	Team	League	GP	W	L	T	MIN	GA	SO	GAA	SV%	GP	W	L	T	MIN	GA	SO	GAA	SV%
1969–70	Peterborough Petes	OHA-Jr.	48	—	—	—	2850	142	3	2.99	—	6	2	4	0	360	21	0	3.50	—
1969–70	Montreal Jr. Canadiens	MC	—	—	—	—	—	—	—	—	—	9	7	1	—	371	19	0	3.07	—
1970–71	Peterborough Petes	OHA-Jr.	51	—	—	—	3062	151	5	2.96	—	5	0	3	2	298	22	0	4.43	—
1971–72	Kansas City Blues	CHL	35	13	14	7	2041	121	3	3.55	—	—	—	—	—	—	—	—	—	—
1972–73	Portland Buckaroos	WHL	17	6	8	2	951	52	2	3.28	.899	—	—	—	—	—	—	—	—	—
1972–73	Richmond Robins	AHL	37	—	—	—	2138	117	0	3.26	—	3	0	3	—	123	17	0	8.29	—
1973–74	Minnesota Fighting Saints	WHA	40	21	18	0	2290	137	1	3.59	.903	7	4	2	—	372	25	0	4.03	.902
1974–75	Minnesota Fighting Saints	WHA	58	30	23	2	3294	180	2	3.28	.905	12	6	6	—	726	41	1	3.39	.899
1975–76	Minnesota Fighting Saints	WHA	52	26	22	4	3179	177	2	3.34	.898	—	—	—	—	—	—	—	—	—
1975–76	Toronto Toros	WHA	9	3	6	0	551	33	1	3.59	.905	—	—	—	—	—	—	—	—	—
1976–77	Birmingham Bulls	WHA	65	24	34	4	3803	224	4	3.53	.899	—	—	—	—	—	—	—	—	—
1977–78	Birmingham Bulls	WHA	58	24	31	1	3306	210	2	3.81	.877	5	1	4	—	271	26	0	5.76	—
1978–79	New England Whalers	WHA	41	20	17	4	2496	149	2	3.58	.874	8	4	3	—	447	32	0	4.30	—
1979–80	Hartford Whalers	NHL	52	16	24	11	3046	202	0	3.98	.865	1	0	1	—	60	8	0	8.00	.800
1980–81	Hartford Whalers	NHL	54	15	27	12	3152	241	0	4.59	.870	—	—	—	—	—	—	—	—	—
1981–82	Hartford Whalers	NHL	16	5	6	4	898	63	0	4.21	.872	—	—	—	—	—	—	—	—	—
1981–82	Quebec Nordiques	NHL	12	4	5	3	720	62	0	5.17	.837	5	3	2	—	323	21	0	3.90	.866
1982–83	Quebec Nordiques	NHL	17	6	8	2	953	64	0	4.03	.874	—	—	—	—	—	—	—	—	—
1982–83	Vancouver Canucks	NHL	17	7	6	3	934	48	1	3.08	.905	1	1	0	—	60	4	0	4.00	.867
1983–84	Vancouver Canucks	NHL	29	14	10	2	1653	113	0	4.10	.851	2	0	0	—	18	0	0	0.00	1.000
1984–85	Vancouver Canucks	NHL	10	1	5	0	407	44	0	6.49	.819	—	—	—	—	—	—	—	—	—
1985–86	Fredericton Express	AHL	3	2	1	0	179	9	0	3.02	.894	—	—	—	—	—	—	—	—	—
WHA totals			323	148	151	15	18,919	1110	14	3.52	.894	32	15	15	—	1816	124	1	4.10	—
NHL totals			207	68	91	37	11,763	837	1	4.27	.866	9	4	3	—	461	33	0	4.30	.858

"Garrett's stats". The Goaltender Home Page.
