= Blake Price =

Canadian sports broadcaster (born 1974)

- Born: December 15, 1974 (age 51); Winnipeg, Manitoba, Canada
- Occupation: Sports Broadcaster
- Known for: TSN Radio 1040, SportsCentre

Blake Price (born December 15, 1974) is a Canadian sportscaster. He is most recently an anchor on TSN's SportsCentre and a co-host of one of the most popular sports radio show’s in Vancouver, "Sekeres and Price Show" on The nation network podcast channel. While a host at TSN Radio 1040 alongside colleague Matt Sekeres, on February 9, 2021 he was laid off as part of that station's switch away from a sports radio format.

In April 2021, Price and co-host Matt Sekeres announced they would be bringing back their popular show in an all-new format as a podcast and a daily live stream show online from 3pm to 6pm PST in a studio located in the Sheraton Wall Center in Downtown Vancouver.

== Career ==
Price began his broadcasting career in the mid-1990s, where he worked in news and traffic for CKWX Radio, as a writer, producer, and weekend sports anchor on CKVU-TV's Sports Page in Vancouver, and then as a sports anchor in Saskatchewan on Sportline. He then spent nearly 3 years at the now defunct MOJO Sports Radio, before joining TSN Radio 1040.

In 2001, Price joined TSN as the co-host of the 2 a.m. ET edition of SportsCentre, after which he moved into the 10 p.m. ET slot the following year alongside Darren Dutchyshen. In addition to hosting SportsCentre, Price co-hosts TSN Radio 1040's PM Drive weekdays from 2 to 6 p.m., alongside Matt Sekeres, and provides Vancouver Canucks game day coverage.

== Personal life ==
Price was born in Winnipeg, Manitoba. He graduated from the University of British Columbia and the British Columbia Institute of Technology.

The British Columbia Association of Broadcasters named Price "Performer of Tomorrow" in 2000.
