= Breakaway PPV =

Pay per view broadcasting

- Country: Canada
- Broadcast area: Regional

Programming
- Picture format: 480i (SDTV)

Ownership
- Owner: Calgary Flames, Edmonton Oilers, Vancouver Canucks

History
- Launched: 2000
- Closed: 2010
- Replaced by: Sportsnet One (assumed broadcast rights to games carried)

Breakaway PPV was a Canadian English language regional pay-per-view television provider in Western Canada and the territories. Breakaway is jointly owned by the parent companies of the Vancouver Canucks, Calgary Flames, and Edmonton Oilers at 33.33% each. Licensed in 2000, its sole offerings were regional pay-per-view broadcasts of National Hockey League games involving the aforementioned teams which are not available through other broadcast or cable channels. The Breakaway name was not used on-air; the services were branded as Canucks TV, Flames PPV, and Oilers PPV respectively.

The service has not operated since the end of the 2009–10 NHL season – beginning with the 2010-11 NHL season, Sportsnet secured long-term deals for the packages of Canucks, Oilers, and Flames regional broadcasts previously allocated to Breakaway, and established new regional sub-feeds carried with Sportsnet One to serve as overflow channels in case of programming conflicts. Despite its dormancy, the CRTC continued to issue interim license renewals for the service through August 2013

Breakaway was not affiliated with a similar pay-per-view package of Ottawa Senators games, branded as "Sens TV", which was offered over roughly the same timeframe. Instead, the Senators distributed these games through the main incumbent PPV provider serving each cable or satellite provider (namely Viewers Choice, Vu!, or Shaw PPV). It too was discontinued in favour of a deal with Sportsnet One in 2010.

== See also ==
- NHL Centre Ice
- List of Vancouver Canucks broadcasters
