= Dave Tomlinson =

Canadian ice hockey player

- Born: May 8, 1969 (age 57) North Vancouver, British Columbia, Canada
- Height: 178 cm (5 ft 10 in)
- Weight: 87 kg (192 lb; 13 st 10 lb)
- Position: Centre
- Shot: Left
- Played for: Toronto Maple Leafs; Winnipeg Jets; Florida Panthers
- NHL draft: 1989 NHL Supplemental Draft; Toronto Maple Leafs
- Playing career: 1991–2006

David Holland Tomlinson (born May 8, 1969) is a Canadian retired professional ice hockey centre. He played college hockey at Boston University on a scholarship from 1987 to 1991. Following graduation, he competed in both the AHL and IHL and appeared in 42 NHL games with the Toronto Maple Leafs, Winnipeg Jets, and Florida Panthers. He also represented Canada's National Team in several international tournaments. After his time in the NHL, he spent a decade playing professionally in Europe. He currently serves as a color commentator for Vancouver Canucks broadcasts on CBC Sports and Sportsnet.

== Broadcasting career ==
He succeeded Tom Larscheid as the color commentator for Vancouver Canucks radio broadcasts on Team 1040, later known as TSN 1040, beginning with the 2010–11 season. He continued in that role until the conclusion of the 2016–17 season, when the station lost its radio broadcast rights for Canucks games.

On March 13, 2019, Tomlinson was among several on-air personalities who were unexpectedly let go from TSN 1040.

In October 2021, Tomlinson was appointed as the inaugural radio color commentator for the Seattle Kraken, the National Hockey League's newest expansion team. Throughout the Kraken’s first two seasons in the league, Tomlinson played a key part in shaping the team’s media identity and connecting fans to the action on the ice through engaging and informative broadcasts.

On September 19, 2023, Tomlinson was announced as the primary color commentator for the Vancouver Canucks’ regional broadcasts on CBC/Sportsnet for the 2023–24 season, with Ray Ferraro set to cover select games as a substitute.

== Career statistics ==
=== Regular season and playoffs ===
			Regular season					Playoffs
Season	Team	League	GP	G	A	Pts	PIM	GP	G	A	Pts	PIM
1985–86	Summerland Buckaroos	BCJHL	52	48	40	88	78	—	—	—	—	—
1986–87	Richmond Sockeyes	BCJHL	51	43	65	108	75	—	—	—	—	—
1987–88	Boston University	HE	34	16	20	36	40	—	—	—	—	—
1988–89	Boston University	HE	34	16	30	46	28	—	—	—	—	—
1989–90	Boston University	HE	43	15	22	37	53	—	—	—	—	—
1990–91	Boston University	HE	41	30	30	60	55	—	—	—	—	—
1991–92	St. John's Maple Leafs	AHL	75	23	34	57	75	12	4	5	9	6
1991–92	Toronto Maple Leafs	NHL	3	0	0	0	2	—	—	—	—	—
1992–93	St. John's Maple Leafs	AHL	70	36	48	84	115	9	1	4	5	8
1992–93	Toronto Maple Leafs	NHL	3	0	0	0	2	—	—	—	—	—
1993–94	Winnipeg Jets	NHL	31	1	3	4	24	—	—	—	—	—
1993–94	Moncton Hawks	AHL	39	23	23	46	38	20	6	6	12	24
1994–95	Cincinnati Cyclones	IHL	78	38	72	110	79	10	7	3	10	8
1994–95	Florida Panthers	NHL	5	0	0	0	0	—	—	—	—	—
1995–96	Cincinnati Cyclones	IHL	81	39	57	96	127	17	4	12	16	18
1996–97	Adler Mannheim	DEL	49	19	30	49	56	9	3	4	7	16
1997–98	Adler Mannheim	DEL	45	20	32	52	60	10	4	11	15	10
1998–99	Adler Mannheim	DEL	49	12	27	39	74	12	7	3	10	12
1999–00	Adler Mannheim	DEL	56	20	30	50	101	5	1	2	3	6
2000–01	Adler Mannheim	DEL	59	21	24	45	84	12	4	7	11	28
2001–02	Adler Mannheim	DEL	33	9	16	25	26	12	1	2	3	8
2002–03	Nürnberg Ice Tigers	DEL	21	6	5	11	16	3	0	0	0	8
2003–04	Hamburg Freezers	DEL	46	8	17	25	109	11	4	5	9	10
2004–05	Hamburg Freezers	DEL	43	14	9	23	34	6	1	0	1	0
2005–06	EV Zug	NLA	2	0	1	1	0	—	—	—	—	—
2005–06	HC Martigny	NLB	35	8	19	27	58	—	—	—	—	—
2005–06	Krefeld Pinguine	DEL	4	0	2	2	33	5	2	2	4	2
DEL totals			405	129	192	321	593	85	27	36	63	100
NHL totals			42	1	3	4	28	—	—	—	—	—
