= Jim Hughson =

Canadian sportscaster (born 1956)

- Born: October 9, 1956 (age 70); Fort St. John, British Columbia, Canada
- Sports commentary career
- Teams: Vancouver Canucks (1979–1982, 1994–2008); Toronto Maple Leafs (1982–1986); Montreal Expos (1987–1989); Toronto Blue Jays (1990–1994, 2007–2008)
- Genres: Play-by-play (television and radio)
- Sports: Ice hockey, baseball

Jim Hughson (born October 9, 1956) is a retired Canadian sportscaster, best known for his play-by-play of the National Hockey League. He was the lead play-by-play commentator for the NHL on Sportsnet from 2014 to 2021 and Hockey Night in Canada from 2008 to 2021. His career spanned 42 years.

== Career ==
=== Early career ===
Hughson worked on Vancouver Canucks radio broadcasts, working on the pre-game, intermission, and post-game shows in the early 1980s. He also filled in as play-by-play man when Jim Robson had national TV duties. In this role, he broadcast games three and four of the 1982 Stanley Cup Final between the Canucks and New York Islanders. In 1982, he left to become the television voice of the Toronto Maple Leafs, before joining TSN in 1986.

=== TSN ===
Hughson worked for TSN from 1986 to 1994, working as the lead play-by-play announcer for the network's NHL games, paired with Gary Green and Roger Neilson (until 1989). In 1991, he called the World Junior Hockey Championship in Saskatchewan, which climaxed with a dramatic game in Saskatoon between Canada and the USSR, in which John Slaney scored the winning goal late in the third period to deliver the gold medal to Canada.

In addition to hockey, Hughson also called baseball for TSN. He worked on Montreal Expos broadcasts for the network from 1987 to 1989. Then in 1990, Hughson became the regular play-by-play announcer for Toronto Blue Jays broadcasts, alongside Buck Martinez. During that time, Hughson was most famous for calling all three of the games in which the Jays' clinched first place in the American League East during the 1990s (1991, 1992, and 1993).

During Hughson's time at TSN, he often enthusiastically proclaimed "That's hockey!" when describing an exciting play during NHL broadcasts. TSN later adopted the phrase as the name of its popular program That's Hockey, which started in October 1995, a talk show covering NHL happenings.

=== CTV Sportsnet/Rogers Sportsnet ===
In 1998, Hughson returned to national sports broadcasting, joining CTV Sportsnet (now Rogers Sportsnet) as their main NHL play-by-play commentator alongside Craig Simpson. A year later, he left radio and began working on the Canucks regional television broadcasts on Sportsnet Pacific, alongside Ryan Walter. From 2002–03 onwards, former NHL goaltender John Garrett was his partner. He was also the host of Snapshots, a weekly half-hour show where he interviewed various sports personalities, from 1998 to 2006.

=== Hockey Night in Canada and Sportsnet ===
In 2005, Hughson was hired by CBC as Hockey Night in Canada's secondary play-by-play announcer. Hughson called the late games of the network's Saturday night doubleheaders and one series through the Conference Finals. In 2006, he was the secondary play-by-play announcer for CBC's coverage of men's ice hockey at the Winter Olympics in Turin, Italy. For three seasons, he continued calling Canucks' regional telecasts on Sportsnet Pacific. However, on March 11, 2008, he signed an exclusive six-year contract with the CBC, leaving Rogers Sportsnet at the conclusion of the 2007–08 season.

The following season, he replaced Bob Cole as the lead play-by-play announcer for HNIC. On top of calling the main Saturday night game (usually involving the Toronto Maple Leafs or the late Saturday night game involving Vancouver Canucks), he also called the NHL All-Star Game, the Winter Classic, the top Conference Final, and the Stanley Cup Final. He also called men's ice hockey at the 2014 Winter Olympics in Sochi, Russia. His partner on the lead broadcast team was his former Sportsnet partner Craig Simpson and, from 2009 to 2016, former NHL goaltender Glenn Healy.

In October 2014, Hughson re-joined Sportsnet, as its parent company Rogers Communications had acquired sole national television rights to the NHL in Canada, taking effect as of the 2014–15 season. The trio (until 2016) remained as the lead broadcast team for HNIC (which remained on CBC as part of a sub-licensing deal until that deal ended in 2026), but may now also appear on other Sportsnet national games when needed.

During the 2020–21 NHL season, Hughson only called national Vancouver home games due to concerns over the COVID-19 pandemic.

Hughson announced his retirement on September 21, 2021, before the 2021–22 NHL season.

=== Other appearances ===
Hughson returned to the broadcast booth for the Toronto Blue Jays when CBC picked up a package of Blue Jays games for the 2007 and 2008 seasons. The broadcast on June 22, 2007, was the first baseball game he had called in 13 years.

In addition to his Canadian sportscasting work, Hughson has made occasional appearances for ABC and ESPN in the United States, covering both hockey and baseball.

Hughson is known as the play-by-play voice of EA Sports' NHL series of video games from 97 to 09. He also provided the play-by-play in EA's Triple Play series for PlayStation and PC from 1997 to 2001, along with his former Blue Jays broadcast partner Buck Martinez.

Hughson has also had small roles in two sports-related family comedies: MVP: Most Valuable Primate (2000) and Air Bud: Seventh Inning Fetch (2002). He played announcers in both films.

== Awards ==
Hughson has won five Gemini Awards, the most recent in 2004, where he was named the best sports play-by-play or analyst. In 2019, the Hockey Hall of Fame announced that Hughson was named as the winner of the annual Foster Hewitt Memorial Award, honouring outstanding contributions by a hockey broadcaster.

Hughson was inducted into the BC Sports Hall of Fame as a member of the media, in 2024.

== Personal life ==
Hughson was born on October 9, 1956 Fort St. John, British Columbia. He lives in South Surrey, British Columbia with his wife Denise. He has a daughter named Jennifer and son Matthew. Hughson is an avid runner with routes in all NHL cities.

Preceded by Bob Cole	Stanley Cup Final Canadian network television play-by-play announcer 2009–2020	Succeeded by Chris Cuthbert
