= List of Seattle Kraken broadcasters =

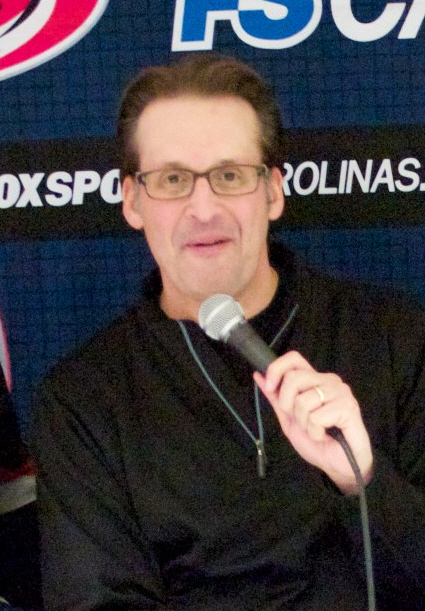
John Forslund has been the Kraken's play-by-play announcer for all three of their seasons.

The Seattle Kraken are a professional ice hockey team based in Seattle. The Kraken compete in the National Hockey League (NHL) as a member of the Pacific Division and began play during the league's 2021–22 season. Throughout their history, Kraken games have been televised primarily on Root Sports Northwest and radio broadcast primarily on KJR-FM.

Former Hartford Whalers and Carolina Hurricanes broadcaster John Forslund serves as the team's television play-by-play announcer. J. T. Brown is the Kraken's primary television color analyst. In August 2022, the team hired Eddie Olczyk to be a television analyst alongside Forslund and Brown. Olczyk maintained his job at TNT as the lead color commentator and called the Kraken's games as his schedule allowed. In July 2026, Eddie Olczyk announced he would be leaving to focus on his family as well as his main position at TNT. Piper Shaw has served as the ice level reporter for all three of their seasons. Alison Lukan is a studio analyst for Root Sports Northwest who filled in for Brown for a few games during the 2021–22 season and did the same for Olczyk. Nick Olczyk joined her as a TV, radio, and mobile app contributor for the 2022–23 season.

Everett Fitzhugh serves as the team's primary radio play-by-play announcer. He is the first Black full-time play-by-play announcer in NHL history. Former NHL player and Vancouver Canucks broadcaster Dave Tomlinson served as Fitzhugh's color analyst for the Kraken's first two seasons, before resigning in August 2023 to take a new broadcasting job in Canada. The Kraken then hired former Seattle Thunderbirds forward and Everett Silvertips commentator Al Kinisky to replace him. Mike Benton is the studio host for all radio broadcasts, serving pre-game, intermission, and post-game coverage. In 2021, Fitzhugh tested positive for COVID-19 prior to the Kraken's first-ever regular season road trip; on radio broadcasts, John Forslund and veteran KJR broadcaster Ian Furness filled in on play-by-play duties. The telecast for the Kraken's February 17, 2022, game against the Winnipeg Jets had Fitzhugh on play-by-play and Brown on color commentary, comprising the first all-Black broadcast booth in NHL history.

Kraken games were televised regionally on Root Sports Northwest for the team's first three seasons. On April 25, 2024, the Kraken signed a deal with Tegna, owners of Seattle NBC affiliate KING-TV and independent KONG, to air their games throughout their territory, with streaming handled by Prime Video. For radio, Kraken games are broadcast on KJR-FM 93.3 and KJR 950 AM, the flagship stations of the Kraken Audio Network. During a schedule conflict, some games may be heard on 96.5 KJAQ.

== Television broadcasters ==
- Root Sports Northwest (2021–2024)
- Kraken Hockey Network, KING-TV & KONG-TV (2024–present)

== Television ==
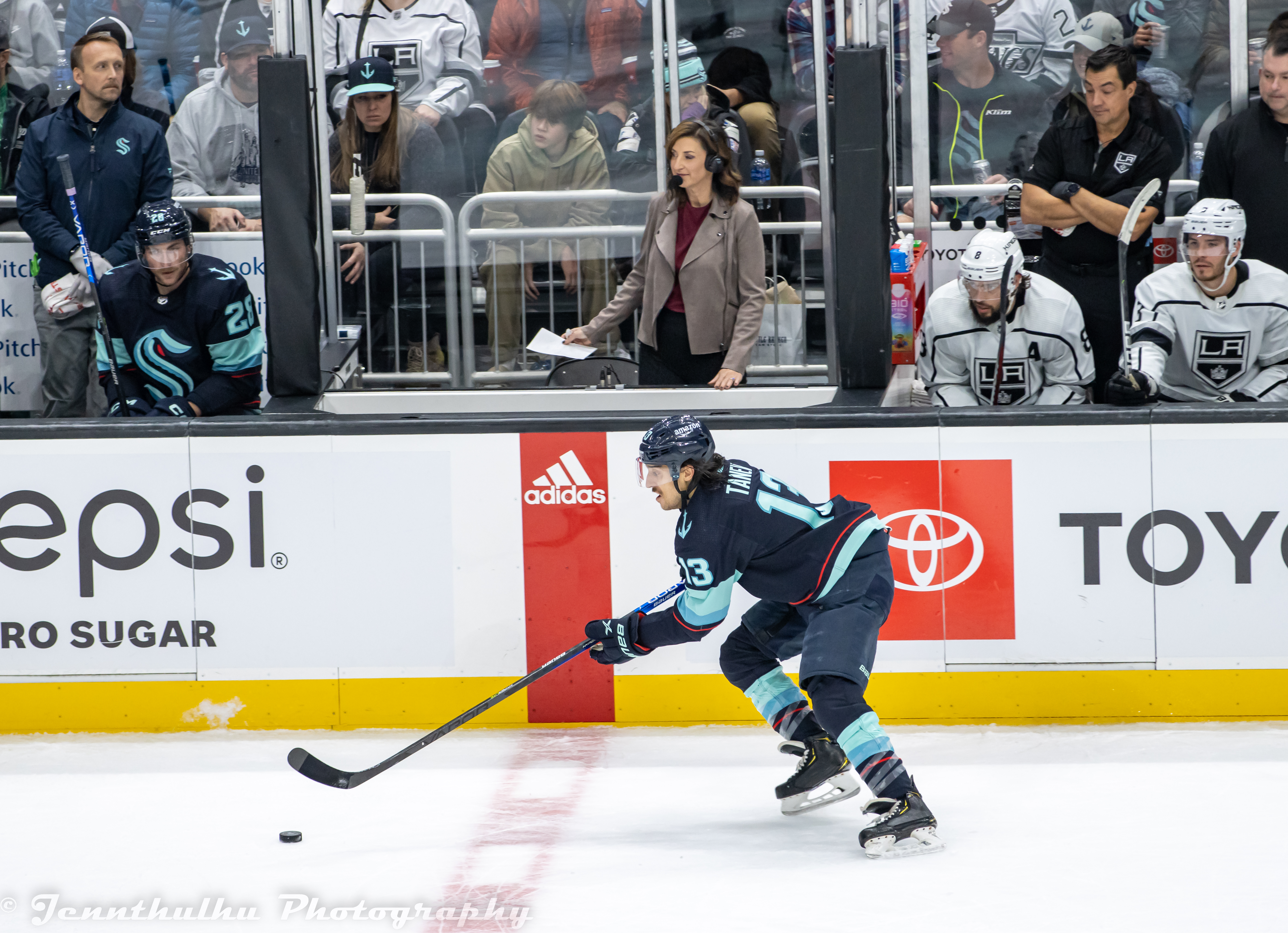
Alison Lukan working between the benches with the Kraken.

In their first season, the Kraken averaged a 0.96 Nielsen rating for games broadcast on Root Sports Northwest. By comparison, the Vegas Golden Knights averaged a 1.87 rating in their first season for games broadcast locally on AT&T SportsNet.

From the beginning of their second season through mid-January 2023, the Kraken averaged a 0.68 rating, in the lowest third of the 23 United States NHL markets for which Nielsen ratings were available, despite a much better record than their first season at the same point. The team launched a new show, entitled What's Kraken?, on the over-the-air station KCPQ, to broaden fan support during the 2022–23 season. Seattle's high percentage of "broadband-only" homes, without cable or satellite TV service, and the unavailability of Root Sports Northwest on most over-the-top media services, contributed to the low ratings.

During their second and third seasons, the Kraken averaged a 0.7 rating for their October games on Root Sports Northwest. Shortly before the 2022–23 season, Comcast moved Root Sports Northwest to a higher-priced tier of service, due to the high cost and low demand for the channel.

Seattle Kraken television broadcasters
Year	Channel	Play-by-play	Color commentator(s)	Ice level reporter	Studio host	Studio analyst(s)
2026–27	Kraken Hockey Network	John Forslund (most games); Everett Fitzhugh (select games); Ian Furness (select games)	J. T. Brown (primary); Eddie Olczyk (select games)	Piper Shaw (most games)	Ian Furness (primary); Piper Shaw (select games)	Alison Lukan and Brett Festerling
2025–26	Kraken Hockey Network	John Forslund (most games); Everett Fitzhugh (select games); Ian Furness (select games)	J. T. Brown (primary); Eddie Olczyk (select games)	Piper Shaw (most games)	Ian Furness (primary); Piper Shaw (select games)	Alison Lukan and Brett Festerling
2024–25	Kraken Hockey Network	John Forslund (most games); Everett Fitzhugh (select games)	J. T. Brown (primary); Eddie Olczyk (select games)	Piper Shaw (most games)	Ian Furness (primary); Linda Cohn (select games)	Alison Lukan
2023–24	Root Sports Northwest	John Forslund	J. T. Brown (most games); Eddie Olczyk (select games); Nick Olczyk (select games)	Piper Shaw (most games)	Ross Fletcher, Tom Glasgow	Alison Lukan and Nick Olczyk
2022–23	Root Sports Northwest	John Forslund	J. T. Brown (most games); Eddie Olczyk (select games); Nick Olczyk (select games)	Piper Shaw (most games)	Ross Fletcher, Tom Glasgow	Alison Lukan and Nick Olczyk
2021–22	Root Sports Northwest	John Forslund (most games); Everett Fitzhugh (select games)	J. T. Brown; Alison Lukan (Replaced Brown during a March game against the Washington Capitals)	Piper Shaw (most games)	Ross Fletcher, Tom Glasgow	Alison Lukan

== Radio ==
Seattle Kraken radio broadcasters
Year	Flagship Station	Play-by-play	Color commentator(s)	Studio host
2026–27	KJR-FM	Everett Fitzhugh (primary); Mike Benton (select games)	Al Kinisky	Mike Benton (primary); Anderson Hirst (select games)
2025–26	KJR-FM	Everett Fitzhugh (primary); Mike Benton (select games)	Al Kinisky	Mike Benton (primary); Anderson Hirst (select games)
2024–25	KJR-FM	Everett Fitzhugh (primary); Mike Benton (select games)	Al Kinisky	Mike Benton (primary); Anderson Hirst (select games)
2023–24	KJR-FM	Everett Fitzhugh	Al Kinisky	Mike Benton
2022–23	KJR-FM	Everett Fitzhugh	Dave Tomlinson	Mike Benton
2021–22	KJR-FM	Everett Fitzhugh (most games); John Forslund (select games when Fitzhugh was sick with COVID-19); Ian Furness (select games when Fitzhugh was sick with COVID-19)	Dave Tomlinson	Mike Benton

As of 2024, the Kraken Audio Network also includes the following stations outside Seattle:

- KISC-HD2 "KIX FM 99.3" Spokane
- KALE AM 960 / FM 106.1 Tri-Cities
- KAPS AM 660 / FM 102.1 Mount Vernon
- KONP AM 1450 / FM 101.7 Port Angeles
- KBDB FM 96.7 Forks
- KSWW FM 102.1 Ocean Shores (Serving Aberdeen)
- KYYO FM 96.9 Olympia
- KGY (HD2 of KYYO) FM 95.3 Olympia
- KPUG AM 1170 Bellingham
- KGMI AM 790 Bellingham
- KXLE-FM 95.3 Ellensburg
- KBBO AM 1390 Yakima
- KMAS AM 1030 / FM 103.3 Shelton
- KPOJ AM 620 Portland
- KCRX FM 102.3 Astoria
- KTZN AM 550 Anchorage
- KKED FM 104.7 Fairbanks
- KTKU FM 105.1 Juneau
- KTKN AM 930 / FM 95.7 Ketchikan
- KSRM AM 920 Kenai
- KIFW AM 1230 Sitka
- KVOK AM 560 / FM 98.7 Kodiak Island
- KRAO-FM FM 102.5 Colfax, Washington Serving Pullman, WA and Moscow, ID
- KOFE AM 1240 St. Maries
- KKVU FM 102.9 Missoula

== See also ==
- List of current National Hockey League broadcasters
