= Mass media in Juneau, Alaska =

Juneau is a center of media in Southeast Alaska. The following is a list of media outlets based in the city.

== Print ==
=== Newspapers ===
The Juneau Empire is the city's primary newspaper, published two days a week. Other newspapers published in the city include:

- Juneau Independent, nonprofit online newspaper
- Whalesong, University of Alaska Southeast student newspaper

== Radio ==
The following is a list of radio stations licensed to and/or broadcasting from Juneau.

=== AM ===
Frequency	Callsign	Format	City of License	Notes
630	KJNO	News/Talk	Juneau, Alaska	-
800	KINY	Adult Contemporary	Juneau, Alaska	-
1330	KXXJ	Oldies	Juneau, Alaska	-

=== FM ===
Frequency	Callsign	Format	City of License	Notes
88.1	KAKI	Christian Contemporary	Juneau, Alaska	Air 1
88.5	K203CH	Religious	Juneau, Alaska	Translator of KTLW, Lancaster, California
88.9	KNGW	Religious	Juneau, Alaska	-
89.7	KLSF	Christian Contemporary	Juneau, Alaska	K-LOVE
90.7	KQQJ	Religious	Juneau, Alaska	Radio 74
94.1	KBJZ-LP	Variety	Juneau, Alaska	-
96.7	K244CU	Religious	Juneau, Alaska	Moody Radio
100.7	KXLL	Adult Album Alternative	Juneau, Alaska	-
102.7	KRNN	Public	Juneau, Alaska	NPR
104.3	KTOO	Public	Juneau, Alaska	NPR
105.1	KTKU	Country	Juneau, Alaska	-
106.3	KSUP	Hot Adult Contemporary	Juneau, Alaska	-
107.9	K300AB	Hot Adult Contemporary	Juneau, Alaska	Translator of KSUP

== Television ==
The Juneau television market encompasses all of Southeast Alaska. In its Fall 2013 ranking of television markets by population, Arbitron ranked the Juneau market 207th in the United States.

The following is a list of television stations that broadcast from and/or are licensed to Juneau.

Display Channel	Network	Callsign	City of License	Notes
3.1	PBS	KTOO-TV	Juneau, Alaska	-
3.2	Create	KTOO-TV	Juneau, Alaska	-
3.3	-	KTOO-TV	Juneau, Alaska	KTOO 360TV (formerly "360 North")
3.4	PBS Kids			-
5.1	NBC	KATH-LD	Juneau, Alaska	-
8.1	ABC	KJUD	Juneau, Alaska	-
8.2	CW	KJUD	Juneau, Alaska	-
8.3	FOX	KJUD	Juneau, Alaska	-
15	-	KCBJ-LP	Juneau, Alaska	-
17	MyNetworkTV	K17HC	Juneau, Alaska	Translator of KAUU, Anchorage, Alaska
26.1	-	K26LI-D	Juneau, Alaska	-
