= Seattle Mariners Radio Network =

Official radio network of MLB's Seattle Mariners

The Mariners Radio Network is the name applied to the radio stations which carry Seattle Mariners baseball games throughout the Pacific Northwest.

Stations are listed by state, then city. All stations broadcast on the AM band unless otherwise noted.

Hall of Fame broadcaster Dave Niehaus was an announcer for the team beginning in 1977 through 2010. In his final season, he did with play-by-play from the bottom of the fourth through the bottom of the fifth and again from the top of the eighth until the end of the game and Rick Rizzs with play-by-play starting from the top of the first through the top of the fourth and again for the sixth and seventh innings. If the Mariners went to extra innings, Niehaus did the odd innings and Rizzs did the even innings. Niehaus died on November 10. For the 2011 season, Rizzs teamed with a rotating group of former Mariners announcers and players, including Ron Fairly, Ken Wilson, Ken Levine, Dave Valle, and Dan Wilson; this lineup was again used in the 2012 season. Aaron Goldsmith joined Rizzs as the club's radio announcing team at the start of the 2013 season.

Live broadcasts are also streamed online on KIRO-AM's website in the Pacific Northwest.

== Flagship history ==
In the 2009 season, the network's flagship station returned to KIRO (710 AM), which became an affiliate of ESPN Radio in April 2009. Rival station KOMO AM 1000 had the broadcast rights for six seasons (2003–08). The original flagship station for the franchise was KVI 570, which carried the broadcasts for the M's first eight seasons (1977–84) and the Seattle Pilots' only season (1969). KIRO's first run as the flagship station was for eighteen seasons (1985–2002).

== Stations ==
Seattle Mariners Radio Network affiliate stations
City/market	State	Station	Frequency	Network status
Juneau	Alaska	KSUP-HD2	106.3-2 FM	Affiliate
Juneau	Alaska	K300AB	107.9 FM	KSUP-HD2 relay
Ketchikan	Alaska	KFMJ	99.9 FM	Affiliate
Sitka	Alaska	KIFW	1230 AM	Affiliate
Sitka	Alaska	KSRM	920 AM	Affiliate
Sitka	Alaska	K223DG	92.5 FM	KSRM relay
Lewiston	Idaho	KOZE	950 AM	Affiliate
Lewiston	Idaho	K238CI	95.5 FM	KOZE relay
Orofino	Idaho	KLER	1300 AM	Affiliate
Honolulu	Hawaii	KGU	760 AM	Affiliate
Honolulu	Hawaii	K236CR	95.1 FM	KGU relay
Albany–Corvallis	Oregon	KEJO	1240 AM	Affiliate
Portland	Oregon	KXTG	750 AM	Affiliate
Salem	Oregon	KYKN	1430 AM	Affiliate
Toledo–Newport	Oregon	KCUP	1230 AM	Affiliate
Aberdeen	Washington	KXRO	1320 AM	Affiliate
Bellingham	Washington	KPUG	1170 AM	Affiliate
Centralia–Chehalis	Washington	KELA	1470 AM	Affiliate
Chelan	Washington	KOZI	1230 AM	Affiliate
Colville	Washington	KCRK-FM	92.1 FM	Affiliate
Forks	Washington	KBDB-HD2	96.7-2 FM	Affiliate
Moses Lake–Ephrata	Washington	KWIQ	1020 AM	Affiliate
Mount Vernon	Washington	KBRC	1430 AM	Affiliate
Mount Vernon	Washington	K275CV	102.9 FM	KBRC relay
Olympia	Washington	K270CJ	101.9 FM	KMAS relay
Port Angeles	Washington	KONP	1450 AM	Affiliate
Seattle–Tacoma	Washington	KIRO	710 AM	Flagship
Seattle–Tacoma	Washington	KIRO-FM	97.3 FM	Select Sunday games
Shelton	Washington	KMAS	1030 AM	Affiliate
Shelton	Washington	K277CZ	103.3 FM	KMAS relay
Spokane	Washington	KXLX	700 AM	Affiliate
Spokane	Washington	K287BV	105.3 FM	KXLX relay
Tri-Cities	Washington	KJOX	1340 AM	Affiliate
Walla Walla	Washington	KGDC	1320 AM	Affiliate
Wenatchee	Washington	KKRT	900 AM	Affiliate
Yakima	Washington	KBBO	1390 AM	Affiliate
Yakima	Washington	K269HF	101.7 FM	KBBO relay

== See also ==
- List of Seattle Mariners broadcasters
- List of SiriusXM channels
