= List of current National Hockey League broadcasters =

The following is a list of current (entering 2026–27 NHL season) National Hockey League broadcasters. With 25 teams in the U.S. and seven in Canada, the NHL maintains separate national broadcasters in each country, each producing separate telecasts of a slate of regular season games, playoff games, and all seven games of the Stanley Cup Final. Games are also shown on multiple regional sports networks in both countries.

== Regional TV broadcasters ==
The following is a list of local TV and radio broadcasters for each individual team. Toronto Maple Leafs regional TV broadcasts are split between Rogers Communications' Sportsnet Ontario and Bell Canada's TSN4. Even though Rogers bought out Bell's stake in the Maple Leafs' parent company Maple Leaf Sports & Entertainment in 2024, it did allow Bell to continue broadcasting a select number of Maple Leafs games on television as part of a content rights agreement. The Buffalo Sabres, Carolina Hurricanes, Columbus Blue Jackets, Dallas Stars, and St. Louis Blues do television/radio simulcasts. Not all teams televise their preseason games.

A select number of teams have resumed broadcasting games on terrestrial television affiliates; teams such as the Chicago Blackhawks, Vegas Golden Knights, Florida Panthers, Dallas Stars, Anaheim Ducks, Seattle Kraken, and Utah Mammoth have utilized this approach.

=== Eastern Conference ===
Team	Play-by-play	Color commentator(s)	Ice level reporter(s)	Studio host(s)	Studio analyst(s)	Flagship station(s)	Over-the-air affiliates	Direct-to-consumer streaming
Boston	Judd Sirott	Andy Brickley (primary); Andrew Raycroft (select home games)	Sophia Jurksztowicz (primary); Andrew Raycroft (select games); Adam Pellerin (select games); Billy Jaffe (select games)	Sophia Jurksztowicz (primary); Adam Pellerin (select games)	Barry Pederson, Billy Jaffe, P. J. Stock, Gigi Marvin, and Andrew Raycroft	NESN	None	NESN 360
Buffalo	Dan Dunleavy	Rob Ray (primary); Martin Biron (select games)		Brian Duff	Martin Biron	MSG Western New York/Bell TV	None	DAZN
Carolina	Mike Maniscalco	Tripp Tracy	Hanna Yates		Shane Willis	Hurricanes Hockey Network	2 (Note: Includes: WRAL-TV; WRAZ) (10 games)	Prime Video
Columbus	Steve Mears	Jody Shelley (most games); Jean-Luc Grand-Pierre (select games); John Davidson (select games)	Dave Maetzold	Brian Giesenschlag	Jean-Luc Grand-Pierre	Blue Jackets Hockey Network	None	Prime Video
Detroit	Ken Daniels	Mickey Redmond (home games and select away games); Chris Osgood (select away games); Larry Murphy (select away games); Stu Grimson (select games)	Daniella Bruce; Logan Reever; Trevor Thompson	Logan Reever; Trevor Thompson	Chris Osgood, Stu Grimson, and Larry Murphy	Detroit SportsNet	None	Detroit SportsNet
Florida	Steve Goldstein	Randy Moller	Katie Engleson	Jessica Blaylock	Ed Jovanovski; Jeff Chychrun (select games)	Scripps Sports	3 (Note: WSFL-TV (Miami/Fort Lauderdale); WHDT (West Palm Beach); WXCW-DT2 (Fort Myers)) (all games)	Panthers+
Montreal	Bryan Mudryk (primary); Victor Findlay (during Mudryk's IIHF or curling assignments)	Frank Corrado (select games); Mike Johnson (select games); Craig Button (select games); Nate Thompson (select games)	Jon Still (most home games); Ryan Rishaug(select home games); Kenzie Lalonde(select home games)	—N/a	—N/a	TSN2 (English Regional)	None	TSN+
Montreal	Pierre Houde	Marc Denis (most games); Bruno Gervais (select games)	Luc Gélinas	Andrée-Anne Barbeau	—N/a	RDS (French Regional)	None	RDS En Direct
New Jersey	Don La Greca	Ken Daneyko	Bryce Salvador (rinkside on all home games)	Rachel Herzog	Bryce Salvador	MSG Sportsnet (primary); MSG Network (during Knicks and Rangers off-days)	None	DAZN
New York Islanders	Brendan Burke (most games); Alan Fuehring (select games)	Thomas Hickey (most games); Butch Goring (select games); Cal Clutterbuck (select games); A. J. Mleczko (select games)	Thomas Hickey (select games); A. J. Mleczko (select games); Cory Schneider (select games)	Shannon Hogan	Thomas Hickey; Cory Schneider (select games); Matt Moulson (select games); Cal Clutterbuck (select games)	MSG Sportsnet (primary); MSG 2 (select games during conflicts with Devils Broadcasts); MSG Network (select games during Knicks, Rangers, and Devils off-days)	None	DAZN
New York Rangers	Kenny Albert (primary); Alex Faust (select games during Albert's absences); John Giannone (select games when both Albert and Faust are on assignment)	Dave Maloney (primary); Brian Boyle (select games)	Michelle Gingras	John Giannone	Steve Valiquette and Henrik Lundqvist	MSG Network (primary); MSG Sportsnet (select during conflicts with Knicks broadcasts); MSG 2 (select during conflicts with Knicks and Devils Broadcasts)	None	DAZN
Ottawa	Gord Miller (primary); Dustin Nelson (select games during Miller's Maple Leafs assignments); Kenzie Lalonde (select games during Miller's Maple Leafs assignments)	Jamie McLennan (primary); Mike Johnson (select games when not on Maple Leafs or Canadiens assignments)	Claire Hanna		—N/a	TSN5 (English regional)	None	TSN+
Ottawa	Jasmin Leroux (primary) Stéphane Leroux (Select games)	Bruno Gervais	Alexandre Tourigny (select home games)	Andrée-Anne Barbeau; Yanick Bouchard; François-Etienne Corbin	Norman Flynn or Karell Émard	RDS (primary French regional); RDS2 (select French regional during conflicts with Canadiens broadcasts); RDS Info (select French regional during conflicts with Canadiens and other sports broadcasts)	None	RDS En Direct
Philadelphia	Jim Jackson	Brian Boucher (primary); Scott Hartnell (select games during Boucher's NHL on TNT assignments); Al Morganti (select games during Boucher's NHL on TNT assignments)	—N/a	Ashlyn Sullivan	Scott Hartnell and Al Morganti	NBC Sports Philadelphia	None	NBC Sports App; Peacock via add-on
Pittsburgh	Josh Getzoff	Colby Armstrong (select games); Phil Bourque (select games)	Dan Potash (select games)	Katie Florio	Mike Rupp, Jay Caufield, Bryan Trottier, Matt Bartkowski, and Ryan Malone	SportsNet Pittsburgh	None	SNP 360
Tampa Bay	Dave Randorf	Brian Engblom	Gabby Shirley	Paul Kennedy	Bobby Taylor and Dave Andreychuk	Scripps Sports/WXPX-TV	5 (Note: WRBW (Orlando/Daytona Beach/Melbourne); WGFL-DT2 (Gainesville); WJAX-DT2 (Jacksonville/Brunswick); WFXU-DT2 (Tallahassee/Thomasville); WFGX (Pensacola/Mobile)) (all games)	Tampa Bay Lightning App
Toronto	Gord Miller	Mike Johnson	Mark Masters	James Duthie	Jeff O'Neill; Darren Dreger; Cheryl Pounder	TSN4	None	TSN+
Toronto	Chris Cuthbert	Craig Simpson	Shawn McKenzie	David Amber	Justin Bourne; Nick Kypreos; Elliotte Friedman	Sportsnet Ontario	None	Sportsnet+
Washington	Joe Beninati	Craig Laughlin; Alan May (rinkside on all home games)	Al Koken	Alexa Landestoy; Russ Thaler; Alan May	Alan May and Brent Johnson	Monumental Sports Network	None	DAZN

=== Western Conference ===
Team	Play-by-play	Color commentator(s)	Ice level reporter(s)	Studio host(s)	Studio analyst(s)	Flagship station(s)	Over-the-air affiliates	Direct-to-consumer streaming
Anaheim	John Ahlers	Brian Hayward (primary); Guy Hebert (select games)	Alyson Lozoff	Alyson Lozoff; Mike Pomeranz	Guy Hebert; Brian Hayward	None	1 (KCOP-TV/KTTV; 65 games)	Prime Video
Calgary	Jon Abbott	Kevin Sawyer	Brendan Parker		Meaghan Mikkelson; Eric Francis; Cory Sarich	Sportsnet West; Sportsnet Flames (during conflicts with Oilers broadcasts or other Sportsnet programming)	None	Sportsnet+
Chicago	Rick Ball	Darren Pang (primary); Caley Chelios (select games during Pang's NHL on TNT assignments); Steve Konroyd (select games during Pang's NHL on TNT assignments)	Luke Stuckmeyer	Pat Boyle, Caley Chelios, or Genna Rose	Caley Chelios, Chris Chelios, Denis Savard, Tony Granato, and John Scott	Chicago Sports Network	7 (Note: Includes: KDMI-DT3 (Des Moines/Ames); KMEG-DT5 (Sioux City); KWKB-DT5 (Cedar Rapids); WHMB-DT2/WHMB-DT6 (Indianapolis); WVTV-DT4 (Milwaukee); WWMT-DT4 (Grand Rapids/Kalamazoo/Battle Creek)) (All games)	CHSN
Colorado	Marc Moser	Mark Rycroft (primary); John-Michael Liles (select games)	Rachel Tos or Kyle Keefe		Mark Rycroft; John-Michael Liles; Erik Johnson (select games)	Altitude Sports	1 (KTVD/KUSA, 20 games)	Altitude+
Dallas	Josh Bogorad	Daryl Reaugh (primary); Brent Severyn (select games)	Brien Rea	Brien Rea	Brent Severyn	None	1 (KDFI/KDFW;17 games)	Prime Video
Edmonton	Jack Michaels	Louie DeBrusk	Gene Principe		Bob Stauffer; Craig MacTavish; Jason Strudwick; Joaquin Gage	Sportsnet West; Sportsnet Oilers (during conflicts with Flames broadcasts or other Sportsnet programming)	None	Sportsnet+
Los Angeles	John Kelly (primary); Josh Schaefer (select games during Kelly's ESPN assignments)	Jim Fox (primary); Tony Granato (select games); Alec Martinez (select games); Daryl Evans (select games); Jarret Stoll (select games)	Carrlyn Bathe	Patrick O'Neal	Jarret Stoll; Daryl Evans	Angels Broadcast Television	TBA	DAZN
Minnesota	Anthony LaPanta	Ryan Carter (select games); Alex Stalock (select games); Lou Nanne (select games)	Kevin Gorg	Katie Storm; Audra Martin	Ben Clymer; Mark Parrish; Wes Walz	Wild+	5 (Note: KSTP-TV/KSTC-TV (Minneapolis/St. Paul); KSAX-TV (Alexandria); KRWF-TV (Redwood Falls); WDIO-TV (Duluth/Superior); KAAL-TV (Rochester/Mason City/Austin)) (10 games)	Prime Video
Nashville	Willy Daunic	Chris Mason (primary); Hal Gill (select games)	Kara Hammer (home games); Lyndsay Rowley (road games)	Lyndsay Rowley	Hal Gill	Scripps Sports/WNPX	9 (Note: WVLT-DT2 (Knoxville); WAGA-DT3 (Atlanta); WAFF-DT3 (Huntsville/Decatur/Florence); WTTO (Birmingham/Anniston/Tuscaloosa); WTVQ-DT2 (Lexington); WDRB-DT2 (Louisville); WMC-DT3 (Memphis); WTVL-CD2 (Chattanooga); WBBJ-DT5 (Jackson))	Nashville Predators App
San Jose	Randy Hahn	Drew Remenda (primary); Scott Hannan (select games); Alex Stalock (select games); Jason Demers (select games); Jamal Mayers (select games)	Tara Slone (select home games)	Natalie Noury	Jason Demers; Mark Smith; Dan Boyle; Ted Ramey; Nick Nollenberger	NBC Sports California	None	NBC Sports App; Peacock via add-on
Seattle	John Forslund (primary); Everett Fitzhugh (select games when Forslund is on assignment for TNT or Prime); Ian Furness (select games when Forslund is on assignment for TNT or Prime)	J. T. Brown	Piper Shaw (primary); Alison Lukan (select games)	Ian Furness (primary); Piper Shaw (select games)	Alison Lukan; Brett Festerling; Tyler Johnson (select games); Grant Fuhr (select games)	Kraken Hockey Network (KONG/KING-TV)	6 (Note: KGW-DT2 (Portland); KSKN-DT4 (Spokane); KAUU-DT4 (Anchorage); KYEX-LD4 (Juneau); KAPP-DT5 (Yakima); KVEW-DT5 (Pasco/Richland/Kennewick); KEVU (Eugene)) (All games)	Prime Video
St. Louis	Chris Kerber	Joe Vitale	Andy Strickland	Scott Warmann	Bernie Federko; Chris Pronger; Jamie Rivers	Blue Note+	1(KMOV/Matrix Midwest, 4 games)	Prime Video
Utah	Matt McConnell	Dominic Moore; Nick Olczyk (rinkside for home games)	Sarah Merrifield	Kim Becker	Nick Olczyk (primary); Tyson Nash (select games/NashCast alternate broadcast)	SEG Media/KUPX-TV	11 (Note: Includes: KASW (Phoenix/Prescott); KWBA-TV (Tucson/Sierra Vista); KIVI-DT2 (Boise); KSAW-LD2 (Twin Falls); Montana Television Network; KTVQ-DT2 (Billings); KXLF-DT2 (Butte); KBZK-DT2 (Bozeman); KRTV-DT2 (Great Falls); KTVH-DT2 (Helena); KPAX-DT2 (Missoula); KAJJ-CD2 (Kalispell)) (All games)	Mammoth+/SEG+
Vancouver	John Shorthouse	Dave Tomlinson (primary); Ray Ferraro (select games)	Dan Murphy		Tyson Barrie	Sportsnet Pacific	None	Sportsnet+
Vegas	Dave Goucher	Shane Hnidy (primary); Darren Eliot (select games); Alec Martinez (select games)	Jamie Hersch (primary); Ashali Vise (select games); Daren Millard (select games)	Daren Millard (primary); Jamie Hersch (select games)	Darren Eliot; Gary Lawless; Jeff Sharples; Alec Martinez	Scripps Sports/KMCC	12 (Note: Includes: KNSN-TV (Reno); KSAW-DT2 (Twin Falls); KIVI-DT2 (Boise); Montana Television Network; KTVQ-DT2 (Billings); KRTV-DT2 (Great Falls); KXLH-LD2 (Helena); KXLF-DT2 (Butte); KBZK-DT2 (Bozeman); KPAX-DT2 (Missoula); KAJJ-CD2 (Kalispell); KASW (Phoenix/Prescott); KWBA-TV (Tucson/Sierra Vista)) (All games)	KnightTime+
Winnipeg	Dan Robertson	Landon Ferraro	Sara Orlesky (select home games)		Craig Button	TSN3	None	TSN+

== Regional radio broadcasters ==
The following is a list of local radio broadcasters for each individual team. Toronto Maple Leafs regional radio broadcasts are split between Rogers Communications' Sportsnet 590 and TSN 1050. Even though Rogers has bought out Bell's stake on the Maple Leafs' parent company Maple Leaf Sports & Entertainment in 2024, it did allow Bell to continue broadcasting a select number of Maple Leafs games on radio as part of a content rights agreement. The Buffalo Sabres, Carolina Hurricanes, and Dallas Stars do television/radio simulcasts. Both the Kings and the New Jersey Devils lack flagship terrestrial radio stations, and have instead partnered with the Internet radio platforms iHeartRadio and Audacy, respectively; the San Jose Sharks likewise abandoned terrestrial radio, instead keeping all audio broadcasts exclusive to its own online platforms. Both the Montreal Canadiens and Ottawa Senators each have local English and French language broadcasts to serve their large anglophone and francophone fan bases. The Florida Panthers, Chicago Blackhawks, and Vegas Golden Knights have all added Spanish language broadcasts to serve their Hispanic fan bases.

† TV/radio simulcasts
Non-English broadcasters

=== Eastern Conference ===
Team	Play-by-play	Color commentator(s)	Ice level reporter(s)	Studio host(s)	Studio analyst(s)	Flagship stations
Boston	Ryan Johnston	Bob Beers; Ken Hodge Jr.(select games)	—N/a	Joe Murray (primary, Sports Hub Headlines during Bruins pregame)	—N/a	WBZ-FM (primary); WBOS (select games during conflicts with Patriots games or road games in conflict with Celtics home games)
Buffalo	Dan Dunleavy	Rob Ray (primary); Martin Biron (select games)				WGR 550†
Carolina	Mike Maniscalco	Tripp Tracy	Hanna Yates		Shane Willis	99.9 The Fan†
Columbus	Steve Mears	Jody Shelley (most games); Jean-Luc Grand-Pierre (select games); John Davidson (select games)	Dave Maetzold	Dylan Tyrer		97.1 The Fan
Detroit	Ken Kal (most games); Bob Kaser (select games)	Stu Grimson; Chris Osgood; Larry Murphy	—N/a	—N/a	—N/a	97.1 The Ticket
Florida	Doug Plagens	Bill Lindsay (home games only)	—N/a	—N/a	—N/a	560 Sports; Radio Libre 790 (during conflicts with Miami Heat broadcasts)
Florida	Arley Londoño	—N/a	—N/a	—N/a	—N/a	990 ESPN Deportes (Spanish Radio)
Montreal	Victor Findlay (primary); Sean Campbell (select games)	J. P. O'Connor (primary); Jon Goyens (select games)	—N/a	—N/a	—N/a	TSN 690 (English Radio)
Montreal	Martin McGuire	Danny Dubé	—N/a	—N/a	—N/a	98.5 FM (French Radio)
New Jersey	Matt Loughlin	Chico Resch	—N/a	—N/a	—N/a	Devils Hockey Network Radio (primary) accessed via NewJerseyDevils.com; WFAN Sports Radio (select games)
New York Islanders	Alan Fuehring	Josh Bailey (select games); Cal Clutterbuck (select games)	—N/a	Cory Wright	Selected Hofstra University radio student	WRCN-FM (select games during conflicts with either Knicks or Rangers broadcasts); WRHU (select games during conflicts with both Knicks and Rangers broadcasts)
New York Rangers	Alex Faust (primary); Alex Thomas (select games)	Dave Starman (primary); Pete Stemkowski (select games)	—N/a	Pat O'Keefe	—N/a	WHSQ (primary) ESPN 1050 AM (during conflicts with Knicks broadcasts)
Ottawa	Dean Brown	Gord Wilson	—N/a	—N/a	—N/a	TSN 1200 (English radio)
Ottawa	Marc Legault	Yanick St-Denis	—N/a	—N/a	—N/a	104.7 FM Outaouais (French radio)
Philadelphia	Tim Saunders	Todd Fedoruk	—N/a	Jason Myrtetus; Brian Smith	—N/a	97.5 The Fanatic; 93.3 WMMR
Pittsburgh	Joe Brand	Phil Bourque (most games); Michelle Crechiolo (select games)	—N/a	Paul Steigerwald	—N/a	The X at 105.9
Tampa Bay	Dave Mishkin	Phil Esposito (home games only); Bobby Taylor (away games only)	—N/a	—N/a	—N/a	102.5 The Bone
Toronto	Todd Crocker	Jim Ralph	—N/a	—N/a	—N/a	Sportsnet 590; TSN 1050
Washington	John Walton (primary); Zack Fisch (select games)	Ken Sabourin	—N/a			WFED 1500 AM; 106.7 The Fan (Selected Games Only)

=== Western Conference ===
Team	Play-by-play	Color commentator(s)	Ice level reporter(s)	Studio host(s)	Studio analyst(s)	Flagship stations
Anaheim	Aaron Cooney	Emerson Etem	—N/a	Alexis Downie	—N/a	Ducks Stream
Calgary	Derek Wills	Meaghan Mikkelson (primary); Pat Steinberg (select games when Mikkelson is on TV)	—N/a	Pat Steinberg	—N/a	QR Calgary 770AM
Chicago	John Wiedeman	Steve Konroyd (primary); Caley Chelios (select games)	Chris Boden	Charlie Roumeliotis	—N/a	WGN Radio (English Radio)
Chicago	Miguel Esparza	Jorge Moreno	—N/a	—N/a	—N/a	Univision Deportes 1200 AM (Spanish Radio)
Colorado	Conor McGahey	Mark Rycroft (national/non-televised games)	—N/a	Mark Bertagnolli	—N/a	Altitude Sports 92.5 FM; Altitude Sports AM 950
Dallas	Josh Bogorad	Daryl Reaugh (primary); Brent Severyn (select games)	Brien Rea	Owen Newkirk	Bruce LeVine	The Ticket†
Edmonton	Cam Moon (when Michaels work regional or select national TV games); Jack Michaels (most national TV games)	Bob Stauffer	—N/a	Bryn Griffiths	Rob Brown	880 CHED
Los Angeles	Josh Schaefer (primary); Jared Shafran (Select games)	Daryl Evans	—N/a		—N/a	KSPN app
Minnesota	Joe O'Donnell	Tom Reid	—N/a	—N/a	—N/a	100.3 FM KFAN: The Fan
Nashville	Pete Weber (primary/home); Max Herz (road)	Jayson More (primary); Hal Gill (select games)	—N/a	—N/a	Max Herz	102.5 The Game (English radio)
Nashville	Alex Martinez; Nayele Amarilla	Jordi Sanchez	—N/a	—N/a	—N/a	El Jefe (Spanish radio)
San Jose	Dan Rusanowsky	Mark Smith (select games); Scott Hannan (select games); Alex Stalock (select games); Jason Demers (select games); Jamal Mayers (select games); Dan Boyle (select games)	—N/a	Ted Ramey	—N/a	Sharks Audio Network (sjsharks.com/listen and Sharks + SAP Center app)
Seattle	Everett Fitzhugh (primary); Mike Benton (select games); John Forslund (select games)	Al Kinisky; Evan Pivnick (select games)	—N/a	Mike Benton (primary); Anderson Hirst (select games)	—N/a	KJR 93.3 FM
St. Louis	Chris Kerber	Joe Vitale	—N/a	—N/a	—N/a	101 ESPN†
Utah	Mike Folta	Nick Olczyk (select games)	—N/a	Adrian Denny	—N/a	KZNS; KSL (during scheduling conflicts with other KZNS programming)
Vancouver	Brendan Batchelor	Randip Janda	—N/a	Arash Memarzadeh	Dominic Sramaty	CKKS-FM
Vegas	Dan D'Uva	Gary Lawless (primary); Darren Eliot (select games)	—N/a	—N/a	—N/a	KKGK (English Radio)
Vegas	Jesus Lopez	Herbert Castro	—N/a	—N/a	—N/a	1460 ESPN Deportes (Spanish Radio)
Winnipeg	Paul Edmonds	Mitchell Clinton	—N/a	—N/a	—N/a	680 CJOB; Power 97

== National broadcasters ==
=== Canada ===
National television rights in Canada are held by Rogers Media, with a sublicensing deal from Amazon Prime Video. Under a new 12-year deal signed in 2026, Sportsnet airs Saturday Night Hockey as its flagship broadcast, and Monday Night Hockey on its streaming platform Sportsnet+. Prime Video's flagship broadcast is Wednesday Night Hockey, which they acquired from Sportsnet under the aforementioned deal. On other days of the week, Sportsnet's national broadcasts typically feature all-American matchups, carrying a simulcast of either ESPN, TNT Sports, or a home team's network. On a few occasions, regional Sportsnet broadcasts of Canucks, Flames, Maple Leafs, and Oilers games may be converted to a national broadcast, with no blackouts and the host team's network in charge of in-game coverage. During the playoffs, games are split between Sportsnet and Prime Video through the first two rounds, with Sportsnet covering the final two rounds exclusively.

Sportsnet previously aired a national NHL telecast on Sunday (2014–2020) and Monday nights (2021–2022) under the Hometown Hockey brand. The Monday night games were then rebranded as Monday Night Hockey from 2022 onward, initially airing on Sportsnet before moving to Prime Video from 2024 to 2026. Sportsnet also held a sublicensing deal with CBC Sports to carry Hockey Night in Canada from 2014 to 2026.

Additionally, the Quebecor Media-owned TVA Sports receives French-language rights as part of another sub-licensing deal with Rogers.

==== Announcers ====
Play-by-play	Color commentator(s)	Host/reporter	Network
Chris Cuthbert; John Bartlett; Harnarayan Singh; Jack Michaels; John Shorthouse; Jon Abbott; Mike Luck	Craig Simpson; Garry Galley; Louie DeBrusk; Dave Tomlinson; Sam Cosentino; Jason York; Ray Ferraro	Kyle Bukauskas; Shawn McKenzie; Sean Reynolds; Gene Principe; Dan Murphy; Caroline Cameron; Brendan Parker; Faizal Khamisa	Sportsnet
John Forslund (primary); Ken Daniels (secondary)	Jody Shelley; Shane Hnidy; Thomas Hickey; Tyson Nash	Adnan Virk; Andi Petrillo	Amazon Prime Video (English)
Alain Crête; Michaël Roy	Jean-Luc Grand-Pierre	Marc-André Perreault; Maxime Lalonde	Amazon Prime Video (French)
Félix Séguin; Sébastien Goulet; Denis Casavant; Alexis Goulet; J.P. Bertrand	Patrick Lalime; Alain Chainey; Alexandre Picard; Mathieu Chouinard	Renaud Lavoie; Anthony Martineau; Elizabeth Rancourt; Michel Godbout	TVA Sports (French)

=== United States ===
National television rights in English language in the United States are held by ESPN/ABC and TNT Sports, with ESPN Deportes broadcasting games in the Spanish language. During the regular season, ESPN, TBS, and TNT airs most nationally televised games; TruTV also carries select games simulcast from TNT. Most national games on ESPN would not be available on television; instead they are streamed online exclusively on ESPN+. ABC will also air a select number of games nationally. The NHL Network in the U.S. also regularly airs games, but primarily simulcasts of either a regional or Canadian feed. Starting in 2021, Saturday (early-season) or Sunday (mid-late season) afternoon games on NHL Network were rebranded as the NHL Network Showcase, using the network's on-air staff instead of merely simulcasting a regional feed.

All nationally televised regular season games on ESPN and ABC are exclusive broadcasts; games on TNT may co-exist with regional networks. Likewise, games produced by ESPN that stream on ESPN+ are exclusive and not available to co-exist with the regional networks. Except for playoff games aired on ABC, first round playoff games may be aired by the local networks alongside ESPN and TNT, but all playoff games from the second round onward would be exclusive to either of the three networks.

==== Announcers ====
Play-by-play	Color commentator(s)	Ice-level analyst(s)	Rinkside reporter(s)	Rules analyst(s)	Network
Sean McDonough; Bob Wischusen; Mike Monaco; Steve Levy; John Buccigross; Roxy Bernstein; John Kelly	Ray Ferraro; Kevin Weekes; A. J. Mleczko; Cassie Campbell-Pascall; Mark Messier; P. K. Subban; T. J. Oshie; Erik Johnson	Ray Ferraro; Kevin Weekes; T. J. Oshie; Erik Johnson; Cassie Campbell-Pascall	Emily Kaplan; Stormy Buonantony; Leah Hextall; Blake Bolden; Greg Wyshynski; Ryan Clark; Kristen Shilton	Dave Jackson	ESPN; ESPN2; ABC; ESPN+/Hulu; ESPN app
Kenny Albert; Brendan Burke; John Forslund; Alex Faust; Steve Mears; Randy Hahn	Eddie Olczyk; Jennifer Botterill; Butch Goring; Brian Boucher; Shane Hnidy; Jody Shelley; Colby Armstrong; Drew Remenda	Brian Boucher; Darren Pang; Darren Eliot; Colby Armstrong; Shane Hnidy; Jody Shelley; Chris Mason	Jackie Redmond; Tarik El-Bashir; Nabil Karim; Meaghan Mikkelson	—N/a	TNT truTV; TBS; HBO Max
John Ahlers; John Forslund; Steve Goldstein	Brian Hayward; Jim Fox; Billy Jaffe	Billy Jaffe; Josh Appel	—N/a		Sports USA Radio Network
E. J. Hradek; Bill Spaulding	Kevin Weekes; Mike Johnson; Mike Rupp; Dave Reid	—N/a			NHL Network (NHL Network Showcase)
Kenneth Garay; Rigoberto Plascencia	Carlos Rossell; Marcelo Canto; Alex Pombo	—N/a			ESPN Deportes (Spanish)

== International broadcasters ==
=== Africa ===
Country	Broadcaster
Sub-Saharan Africa	ESPN

=== America ===
Country	Broadcaster
Latin America	ESPN
Brazil	ESPN
Caribbean	ESPN

=== Asia ===
Country	Broadcaster
China	CCTV
Israel	Sport 5
Kazakhstan	Q Sport
Kyrgyzstan	Q Sport
Philippines	Premier Sports
Tajikistan	Varzish TV

=== Europe ===
Country	Broadcaster
Andorra	Disney+, Movistar+
Armenia	Fast Sports
Austria	Sky Sport, Puls 4,
Azerbaijan	TBD
Belgium	Disney+
Bosnia and Herzegovina	Arena Sport
Bulgaria	Max Sport
Croatia	Arena Sport
Czech Republic	Nova Sport, Prima Sport
Denmark	Viaplay
Estonia	Go3 Sport
Finland	Viaplay, Disney+, MTV3
France	beIN Sports
(Georgia (country)) Georgia	TBD
Germany	Sky Sport
Greece	Disney+
Hungary	Disney+, Arena4
(Republic of Ireland) Ireland	Premier Sports
Italy	Disney+
Latvia	Go3 Sport
Lithuania	Go3 Sport
Liechtenstein	MySports, 3+ Adrenalin, Sky Sport
Luxembourg	Sky Sport
Malta	Disney+
Moldova	TBD
Montenegro	Arena Sport
Netherlands	ESPN
North Macedonia	Arena Sport
Norway	Viaplay
Poland	TBD
Portugal	SportTV
Romania	Disney+, Antena
San Marino	Disney+
Serbia	Arena Sport
Slovakia	Nova Sport
Slovenia	Arena Sport
Spain	Disney+, Movistar+
Sweden	Viaplay, Disney+
Switzerland	MySports, 3+ Adrenalin
Turkey	TBD
Ukraine	Setanta Sports
United Kingdom	Viaplay

=== Oceania ===
Country	Broadcaster
Australia	ESPN, 9Go!
New Zealand	ESPN
Pacific Islands	ESPN
Papua New Guinea	ESPN

== See also ==
NHL networks

- NHL Network (United States)
- NHL Network (Canada) (2001–2015)

Out-of-market packages

- NHL Center Ice (U.S.)
- NHL Centre Ice (Canada)
- National Hockey League on television
- List of current Major League Baseball broadcasters
- List of current Major League Soccer broadcasters
- List of current NBA broadcasters
- List of current NFL broadcasters
