= Golden North Salmon Derby =

Fishing contest in Alaska, US

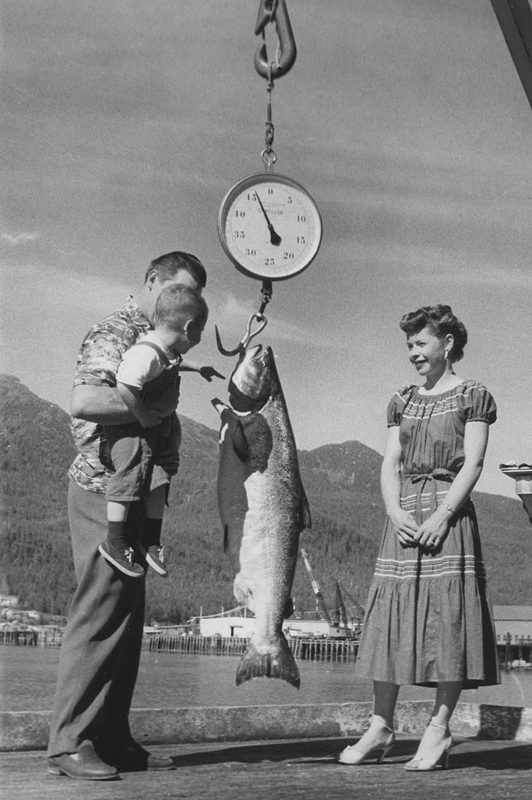
Golden North Salmon Derby Winner 1955, Bob Pasquan

The Golden North Salmon Derby is an annual salmon fishing competition held in Juneau, Alaska in August. The object of the event is to catch the largest Chinook or Coho salmon over a period of three days; pink and chum salmon are not accepted.

The area appropriate for fishing is known as the derby grounds. Its northern, eastern, southern and western limits are Point Bridget, Greely Point, Twin Point, and Point Couverton, respectively. Contestants may anchor their vessels overnight in Swanson Harbor, southwest of Point Couverton, but this area is not allowed for fishing.

Prizes are awarded to the top hundred finishers, including cash and gift certificates/gift cards. Fish can be weighed at any of four stations at Shelter Island, Amalga Harbor, Auke Bay, or Douglas Island. Additionally, the organizers release twelve specially-tagged salmon into the derby ground. One of these is chosen as a special prize which earns $100,000 if it is caught. Competitors must purchase tickets to compete in the derby.

The proceeds from the sale of the turned-in fish are given to the Territorial Sportsmen Scholarship Foundation, which awards academic scholarships to local students. This has been a part of the derby since 1953.

== History ==
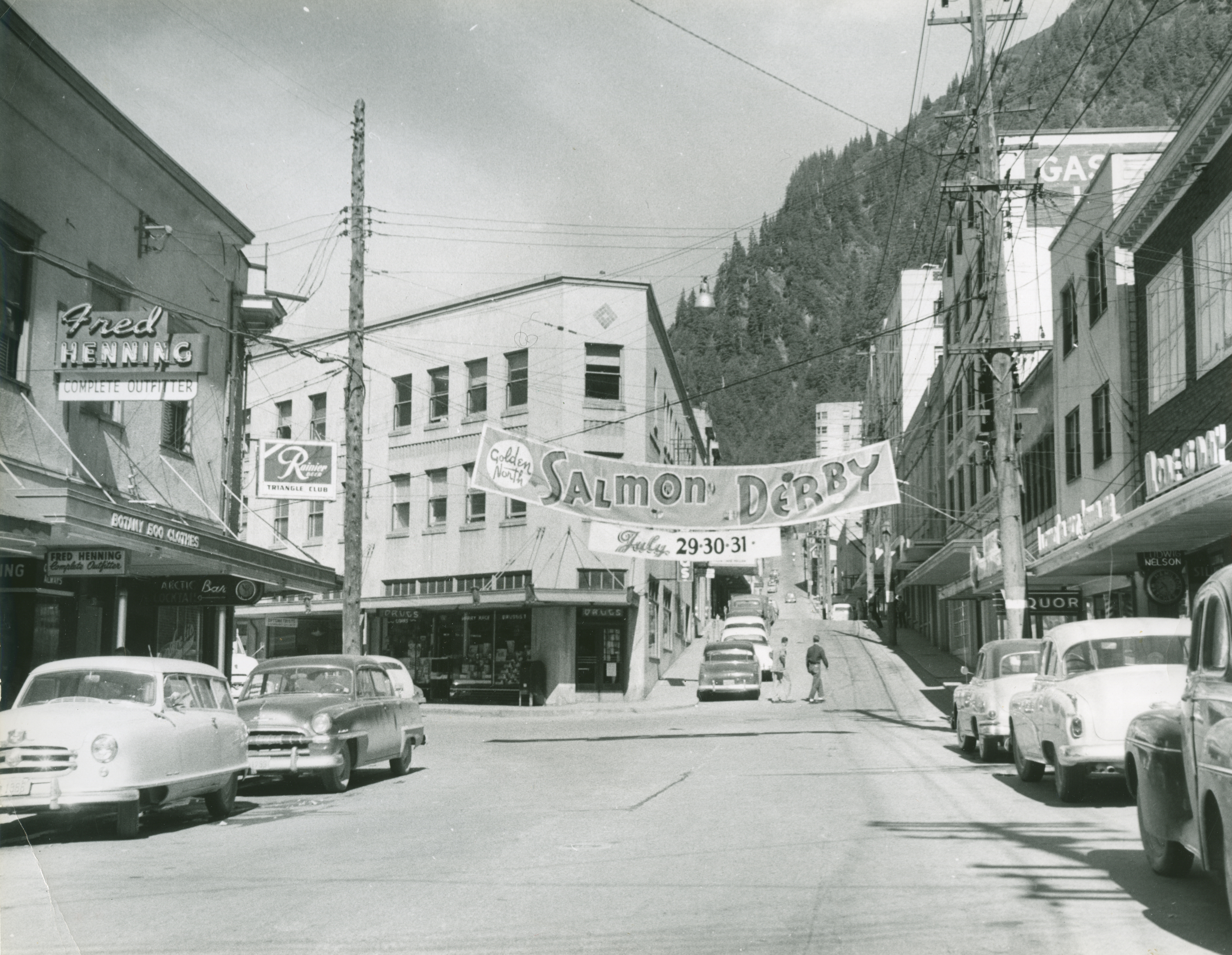
This view of Franklin Street in 1955 shows a banner for the Golden North Salmon Derby hanging above the intersection of Franklin and Front Streets. The Triangle Building is directly behind the banner.

The derby has evolved for over 50 years. It was begun on August 31, 1947, and earned its official name in 1948. For many years, live coverage of the derby has been broadcast on local radio stations KINY and KSUP. There was no broadcast from 1980 to 1982, due to a dispute with the Federal Communications Commission.

2020 saw strict measures undertaken, such as wearing masks & social distancing from other contestants.
