= KJNO =

Radio station in Juneau, Alaska

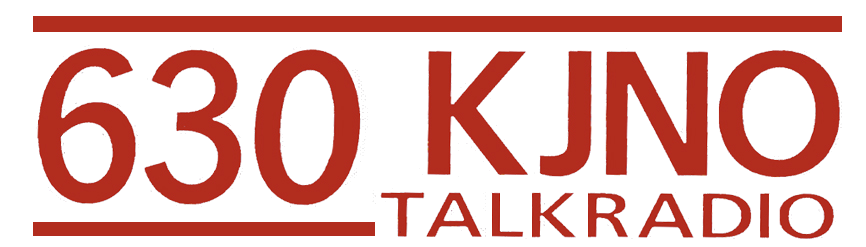
- Juneau, Alaska; United States
- Broadcast area: Alaska Panhandle
- Frequency: 630 kHz

Programming
- Format: Talk and sports
- Affiliations: ESPN Radio

Ownership
- Owner: Alaska Broadcast Communications

History
- First air date: December 5, 1952
- Call sign meaning: Similar to "Juneau"

Technical information
- Licensing authority: FCC
- Facility ID: 61235
- Class: B
- Power: 5,000 watts (day); 1,000 watts (night)
- Transmitter coordinates: 58°19′45.83″N 134°28′23.79″W
- Translator: 97.5 K248DQ (Juneau)

Links
- Public license information: Public file; LMS
- Webcast: Listen live (via iHeartRadio)
- Website: kjnoradio.com

KJNO (630 AM) is a radio station broadcasting a talk and sports format. Licensed to Juneau, Alaska, United States, the station serves the Alaska Panhandle area. The station's studios are at the Juneau Radio Center, which is home to KINY, KTKU - TAKU 105, KSUP - MIX 106 and KXXJ - 1330/KXJ.

The station is owned by Alaska Broadcast Communications and features programming from ESPN Radio.
