= Z103 =

Z103 is the on-air brand name of several radio stations in Canada and the United States. Stations using this identifier broadcast within the 102.9 to 103.9 range on FM radio, and usually (but not always) have the letter Z in their call sign as the final letter.

Although the letter Z is normally pronounced "zed" in Canada, Canadian "Z103" stations usually use the American "zee" pronunciation as it rhymes with "three".

Stations using this identifier include:

== Canada ==
- CIDC-FM, in Orangeville, Ontario

== United States ==
- KFTZ, in Idaho Falls, Idaho
- WXZZ, in Lexington, Kentucky, also known as Z-Rock 103

== Former stations ==
- CKMM-FM, in Winnipeg, Manitoba
- CHNO-FM, in Sudbury, Ontario (formerly known as Z103 from 2000 to 2006)
- KIXQ, in Joplin, Missouri (formerly known as Z103 from 1981 to 1991)
- KSBZ in Sitka, Alaska
- WEGR, in Memphis, Tennessee (formerly known as Z103 from 1985 to 1986)
- WMGV, in Newport, North Carolina
- WNND, in Lancaster, Ohio
- WWLA (FM), in Johnstown, Ohio
- WWOF, in Tallahassee, Florida
- WZVA, in Marion, Virginia
- CKHZ-FM, in Halifax, Nova Scotia was formerly called Z103 from 2006 to 2012 (Now Hot Country 103.5)
