= KTNL =

KTNL may refer to:

- KTNL-TV, a television station (channel 13) licensed to Sitka, Alaska, United States
- KXXJ, a radio station (1330 AM) licensed to Juneau, Alaska, United States, which used the call sign KTNL from July 2006 to July 2007
