= KSBZ =

- Sitka, Alaska; United States
- Broadcast area: Metro Sitka
- Frequency: 103.1 MHz
- Branding: Mix 103

Programming
- Format: Hot adult contemporary
- Affiliations: Westwood One

Ownership
- Owner: Alaska Broadcast Communications
- Sister stations: KIFW

History
- First air date: October 18, 1990 (35 years ago)
- Call sign meaning: Station was known as "Z-103" at launch

Technical information
- Licensing authority: FCC
- Facility ID: 60517
- Class: A
- ERP: 3,100 watts
- HAAT: −198 meters (−650 ft)
- Transmitter coordinates: 57°3′25.6″N 135°20′8.3″W

Links
- Public license information: Public file; LMS
- Webcast: Listen live; Listen live (MP3)
- Website: www.sitkaradio.com

KSBZ (103.1 FM, "Mix 103") is an American radio station licensed to serve the community of Sitka, Alaska. The station, established in 1990, is owned by Alaska Broadcast Communications, Inc.

== Programming ==
KSBZ broadcasts a hot adult contemporary music format to the Metro Sitka area. Some programming on the station had derived from Cumulus Media's "Classic Rock" radio network, in its "Rock 103" days. Since the station re-branded as "Mix 103", the syndicated programming and playlist have become identical to that of its Juneau counterpart Mix 106.

== History ==
After applying in July 1989, this station received its original construction permit from the Federal Communications Commission on October 5, 1990. The new station was assigned the KSBZ call sign by the FCC on October 17, 1990.

On October 18, 1990, KSBZ launched with a classic rock and contemporary hit radio format aimed at younger listeners not being effectively served by KIFW. KSBZ received its license to cover from the FCC on October 21, 1991.

In November 1994, license holder Sitka Broadcasting Company, Inc., reached an agreement to sell this station to Alaska Broadcast Communications, Inc. The deal was approved by the FCC on December 7, 1994, and the transaction was consummated on December 31, 1994.

By 1998, KSBZ had switched to a country music format. In 2006, KSBZ switched formats again, this time to an active rock format, before finally settling on a classic rock format a year later. In January 2020, KIFW transferred all its adult contemporary programming over to KSBZ, which relaunched as hot adult contemporary station "Mix 103". KIFW inherited KSBZ's former classic rock programming under a classic hits format, continuing to be known on-air as The Sound of Sitka.
