= Kamilche Hill =

Mountain in Washington (state), United States

- Location within Washington (state)

Highest point
- Elevation: 369.8 m (1,213 ft)(NAVD 88)
- Prominence: 190 m (620 ft)
- Coordinates: 47°08′19.27787″N 123°08′26.15924″W (NAD 83)

Naming
- Language of name: Lushootseed
- Pronunciation: Ka-mil-chee

Geography
- Topo map: Shelton Valley 1:24,000

Kamilche Hill is a 1,213-foot (370 m) peak in Mason County, Washington about 2 miles (3 km) northwest of the Puget Sound community of Kamilche. The summit is within a large private forest owned by Simpson Timber Company. The peak has radio equipment including the KRXY transmitter.
