= Alaska Broadcast Communications =

Alaskan radio broadcasting company

Alaska Broadcast Communications is a local radio broadcasting company, serving the entire southeastern area of Alaska. The main office, along with the Juneau studios, is located at the Juneau Radio Center, located at 3161 Channel Drive in Juneau, Alaska.

The company owns and operates nine stations in three different markets:

Juneau

- KJNO AM 630
- KTKU FM 105.1

Sitka (studios at 611 Lake Street)

- KIFW AM 1230
- KSBZ FM 103.1

Ketchikan (studios at 526 Stedman Street)

- KTKN AM 930
- KGTW FM 106.7

The company previously owned but later sold 3 other stations in Juneau:

- KINY AM 800
- KXXJ AM 1330
- KSUP FM 106.3
