= KGTW =

Coordinates: 55.360°N 131.797°W

- Ketchikan, Alaska; United States
- Broadcast area: Alaska Panhandle
- Frequency: 106.7 MHz
- Branding: Gateway Country

Programming
- Format: Country

Ownership
- Owner: Alaska Broadcast Communications

Technical information
- Licensing authority: FCC
- Facility ID: 789
- Class: C3
- ERP: 440 watts
- HAAT: 666 meters

Links
- Public license information: Public file; LMS
- Webcast: Listen Live

KGTW is a commercial country music radio station in Ketchikan, Alaska, broadcasting on 106.7 FM.

It is owned and operated by Alaska Broadcast Communications. The studios are at 526 Stedman Street in Ketchikan, with sister station KTKN.
