= Root Sports Northwest =

American regional sports television network (1988–2025)

- Country: United States
- Broadcast area: Washington; Oregon; Idaho; Montana; Alaska; Worldwide (via satellite)
- Headquarters: Bellevue, Washington

Programming
- Language: English
- Picture format: 720p (HDTV); 480i (SDTV)

Ownership
- Owner: Seattle Mariners (Baseball Club of Seattle, LP)

History
- Launched: November 5, 1988; 37 years ago
- Closed: December 31, 2025; 9 months ago
- Replaced by: MLB Local Media
- Former names: Northwest Cable Sports (1988–1989); Prime Sports Northwest (1989–1996); Fox Sports Northwest (1996–1999); Fox Sports Net Northwest (1999–2004); FSN Northwest (2004–2008); FS Northwest (2008–2011)

Links
- Website: northwest.rootsports.com

Root Sports Northwest, sometimes branded simply as Root Sports, was an American regional sports network owned by the Seattle Mariners. Headquartered in Bellevue, Washington, the channel broadcast regional coverage of sports events throughout the Pacific Northwest with a focus on professional sports teams based in Seattle and Portland, Oregon. It was available on cable providers throughout Washington, Oregon, Idaho, Montana, and Alaska and nationwide on satellite via DirecTV.

The channel was launched on November 5, 1988, as Northwest Cable Sports and took affiliation with Prime Sports the following year; it became part of Fox Sports Networks (FSN) in 1996 and would continue to use FSN's branding until 2011, when then-owner DirecTV rebranded its channels under the Root Sports name. The Mariners obtained a majority stake in Root Sports Northwest in 2013, which precluded it from the rebrand of its sister channels under AT&T SportsNet in 2017; the team would take full ownership and control of the channel in 2024 after Warner Bros. Discovery (successor in interest to DirecTV's stake via AT&T) elected to divest AT&T SportsNet. Root Sports Northwest ultimately shut down on December 31, 2025, with the Mariners electing to create Mariners.TV with MLB Local Media for streaming and broadcast distribution the following season.

== History ==
Root Sports Northwest was launched in late 1988 as Northwest Cable Sports, by Tele-Communications Inc. (TCI) and Viacom. Early programming included games from Washington and Washington State Universities and Tacoma Stars soccer games. By 1989, it affiliated with the newly formed Prime Sports Network and was rebranded Prime Sports Northwest.

In 1996, News Corporation, which formed a sports division for the Fox network two years earlier after it obtained the broadcast rights to the National Football Conference (NFC) and sought to create a group of regional sports networks, acquired a 50% interest in the Prime Network from TCI's successor Liberty Media. Later that year on November 1, News Corporation and Liberty Media relaunched the Prime Network affiliates as part of the new Fox Sports Net group, with the Seattle-based network officially rebranding as Fox Sports Northwest. The channel was rebranded as Fox Sports Net Northwest in 2000, as part of a collective brand modification of the FSN networks under the "Fox Sports Net" banner. Subsequently, in 2004, the channel shortened its name to FSN Northwest, through the networks' de-emphasis of the "Fox Sports Net" brand.

On December 22, 2006, News Corporation sold its interest in FSN Northwest and sister networks FSN Utah, FSN Pittsburgh and FSN Rocky Mountain to Liberty Media, in an asset trade in which News Corporation also 16.3% traded its 38.5% ownership stake in satellite provider DirecTV for $550 million in cash and stock, in exchange for Liberty Media's stake in the company. On May 4, 2009, DirecTV Group Inc. announced it would become a part of Liberty's entertainment unit, part of which would then be spun off into the separate company under the DirecTV name, in a deal in which Liberty would increase its share in DirecTV from 48% to 54%, with Liberty owner John Malone and his family owning a 24% interest. DirecTV would operate its newly acquired FSN-affiliated networks through DirecTV Sports Networks, a new division formed when the split from Liberty Media was completed on November 19, 2009.

On December 17, 2010, DirecTV Sports Networks announced that its four Fox Sports Networks-affiliated regional outlets would be relaunched under the "Root Sports" brand. The network officially rebranded as Root Sports Northwest on April 1, 2011, with The Dan Patrick Show as the first program under the new Root Sports branding. For nominal purposes, the Root Sports networks continued to carry programming distributed mainly to the Fox Sports regional networks to provide supplementary sports and entertainment programming.

In April 2013, the Seattle Mariners announced that they would acquire controlling interest (a 71% stake) in Root Sports Northwest, as part of a long-term extension of its contract with the team through the 2030 season. DirecTV remained a minority stakeholder (29% stake) and controlling partner, and the network continued to operate under the Root Sports brand.

DirecTV was subsequently acquired by AT&T; on July 14, 2017, its sister networks were re-branded as AT&T SportsNet. The Mariners chose not to rebrand Root Sports Northwest under the AT&T SportsNet banner, though the channel did adopt AT&T SportsNet's graphics package.

Ahead of their 2021–22 seasons, Root Sports Northwest acquired the regional rights to both the Portland Trail Blazers of the NBA, and the Seattle Kraken, a new NHL expansion franchise which began play that season. On September 30, 2021, Dish Network's carriage agreements for Root Sports Northwest, and AT&T SportsNet Pittsburgh and Rocky Mountain expired. Shortly thereafter, DirecTV announced an agreement to carry the channel on its satellite TV service and on DirecTV Stream, its streaming service.

In October 2021, Root Sports added an overflow channel, known as Root Sports Plus, to avoid scheduling conflicts with the Mariners, Kraken, and Blazers. Also that month, Root Sports, along with sister networks AT&T SportsNet Pittsburgh, and AT&T SportsNet Rocky Mountain, was removed from Dish Network satellite and Sling streaming TV services. FuboTV added Root Sports Northwest in that month and became the first streaming-only television provider to offer the channel, after neither Hulu nor YouTube TV signed a carriage agreement.

After the announcement that Warner Bros. Discovery (WBD) would leave the regional sports network business in March 2023, Patrick Crumb, Seattle-based president of AT&T SportsNet operations, said that Root Sports would not be affected. Comcast told customers on October 10, 2023, that it moved Root Sports Northwest to its highest-priced "Ultimate" tier, angering many sports fans. The carrier offered a discounted upgrade fee for six months. In December of that year, The Seattle Times reported that the Mariners would acquire full control of Root Sports at the beginning of 2024, and that WBD would no longer produce Mariners telecasts. As of December 2023, Comcast had about 1.2 million subscribers in the Mariners' home market, down by 65% from 3.4 million in 2014.

In the 2025 season, MLB Local Media assumed production duties for Mariners broadcasts on Root Sports, and the network introduced a direct-to-consumer (DTC) streaming subscription known as Root Sports Stream. On September 26, 2025, days before the end of the Mariners' regular season, the team announced that Root Sports would close, with MLB Local Media taking over the team's distribution rights the following year. As the Mariners already directly employed the network's talent and crew, no on-air staff changed, although more than 25 network staffers were expected to be laid off on or around November 3. Root Sports Northwest's streaming platform shut down on December 14, with the channel officially ceasing operations on December 31. The Mariners worked with MLB Local Media to create Mariners.TV as a streaming and broadcast replacement for the 2026 season, with KING-TV and 21 other stations agreeing to air 10 games on terrestrial television throughout the team's broadcast region.

== Programming ==
=== Seattle Mariners ===
Root Sports held the regional television rights to the Seattle Mariners of Major League Baseball, producing and televising over 150 live regular season games (out of 162 total), along with 30-plus-minute pregame and post-game shows that air before and after all telecasts produced by the network. Other Mariners programming on the network included live Spring Training games, Mariners All Access, which included both weekly editions during the regular season and several other in-season and off-season specials each year, and Mariners Mondays, a three-hour weekly program that aired during the winter months that highlighted memorable games and moments from the past season.

Prime Sports Network began Mariners' broadcasts in 1994, with sixteen of the scheduled 88 televised games; the remainder were broadcast over-the-air on KSTW. A players' strike canceled the last quarter of the 1994 season and the first several weeks of the 1995 season.

=== Seattle Seahawks ===
Root Sports carried shoulder programming for the NFL's Seattle Seahawks, airing head coach Pete Carroll's weekly press conference, branded as Seahawks Press Pass, and the team's weekly magazine program, Seahawks All Access.

=== Utah Jazz and Vegas Golden Knights ===
Until 2023, Root Sports carried Utah Jazz and Vegas Golden Knights games and related programming produced by then-sister network AT&T SportsNet Rocky Mountain on cable providers in Idaho and Montana. DirecTV and streaming providers had access to those games by tuning to AT&T SportsNet Rocky Mountain. On October 25, 2023, Sinclair and the Jazz announced a territory expansion where Root Sports continued to air Utah Jazz games produced by KJZZ-TV. Prior to the 2023–24 NBA season, Jazz games were produced by AT&T Sports Rocky Mountain. Due to territory rights, neither Portland Trail Blazers nor Seattle Kraken games would air in these areas of Idaho and Montana. Golden Knights games left Root Sports in 2023 to pursue over-the-air broadcasting in partnership with Scripps Sports, as well as an OTT subscription service called KnightTime+; this arrangement covered Root Sports' territory. However, the Jazz continued to air games on Root Sports Northwest, simulcasting broadcasts produced by the team for KJZZ-TV and the Jazz+ streaming service. After the announcement of Root Sports' shutdown, the Jazz announced extended Jazz+ coverage into areas formerly served by Root Sports.

==== Teams by media market ====
		MLB	NBA
		Seattle Mariners	Utah Jazz (produced by KJZZ-TV)
Washington	(excluding Seattle)	Yes	Yes
Washington	Seattle market	Yes	No
Oregon	(excluding Portland)	Yes	Yes
Oregon	Portland market	Yes	No
Alaska	(all markets)	Yes	No
Idaho	(excluding Spokane)	Yes	Yes
Idaho	Spokane market	Yes	Yes
Montana	(excluding Spokane)	Yes	Yes
Montana	Spokane market	Yes	Yes

=== Collegiate programming ===
The network was the regional home of Gonzaga Bulldogs men's basketball, producing and airing regular season contests not picked up by a national network, as well as the team's coaches show, The Mark Few Show. The network also aired Talkin' Huskies, Talkin' Cougars, Talkin' Ducks and Talkin' Beavers, insider programs featuring the teams of Washington, Washington State, Oregon and Oregon State, respectively.

=== Former programming ===
- Seattle SuperSonics basketball until the NBA franchise relocated to Oklahoma City (as the Oklahoma City Thunder) in 2008
- WNBA games from the Seattle Storm, before those games moved over-the-air to former sister television station KING-TV (on its 5.2 digital subchannel) and KONG-TV
- Athletic events from the Pac-12 Conference (most often featuring Washington, Washington State, Oregon, or Oregon State) until those were moved to the Pac-12 Network in 2012 and Fox Sports 1 in 2013.
- Seattle Seahawks preseason football games
- Seattle University Redhawks men's basketball
- Western Athletic Conference football and basketball
- The Western Hockey League (2008—2015)
- Seattle Sounders FC and Portland Timbers soccer matches, full game replays, studio and insider programming (currently airs on Apple TV)
- Big Sky Conference football (now aired by Scripps TV affiliates)
- Great Northwest Athletic Conference men's and women's basketball
- Mountain West Conference football and men's basketball
- Washington Interscholastic Activities Association football and basketball, including championship games
- Oregon School Activities Association high school football championships

==== Seattle Kraken ====
Root Sports held the regional television rights to the Seattle Kraken of the National Hockey League. Root Sports was announced as the team's inaugural regional television partner on January 26, 2021. Coverage included live broadcasts of 70-plus regular season games each year, as well as preseason and first-round playoff contests, pregame and postgame shows, game replays, and the weekly magazine program Inside Kraken Hockey.

On April 25, 2024, the Kraken announced that they would be leaving Root Sports in favor of broadcasting over-the-air through a deal with Tegna and its Seattle stations KING-TV and KONG-TV, along with streaming through Amazon Prime Video.

==== Portland Trail Blazers ====
The Portland Trail Blazers of the NBA reached an agreement to carry games on Fox Sports Net Northwest beginning in the 2002–03 season, replacing the unpopular BlazerVision pay-per-views and team-run Action Sports Cable Network. This lasted until 2007, when the team signed with Comcast SportsNet Northwest (now NBC Sports Northwest).

When the Trail Blazers' contract was up for renewal in 2016, Root Sports outbid NBC Sports Northwest for the rights through the 2020–21 season. However, the team declined and renewed with NBC Sports Northwest instead, as Root Sports could not guarantee a carriage agreement with Comcast (NBCSNW's parent company).

In June 2021, it was announced that Root Sports had acquired the regional television rights to the Trail Blazers beginning in the 2021–22 season; the network's wider carriage, especially on streaming services and satellite, in comparison to NBCSNW was a factor in the acquisition. Dish Network dropped all AT&T Sports Networks, including Root Sports, just before the start of the season on September 30. All Trail Blazers telecasts are produced in-house by the team. Additional team content aired on the network includes pre- and post-game shows, game replays, and the weekly magazine program The Trail.

On August 14, 2024, the Trail Blazers announced that they would be leaving Root Sports, though a replacement broadcaster had not been named at that time. The Trail Blazers would later launch the Rip City Television Network in collaboration with the Sinclair Broadcast Group to air games throughout the Oregon and Washington areas.

==== Fox Sports Net/Bally Sports/FanDuel Sports Network affiliation ====
After breaking off from Fox Sports Net in 2011, Root Sports Northwest continued as a longtime affiliate of what is now the FanDuel Sports Network family of networks, carrying some college football, syndicated outdoors and golf programming from it as part of its schedule, though in its last year of existence, it did not add any further programming which began to air in a simulcast with the separate network FanDuel TV.

== Former on-air staff ==
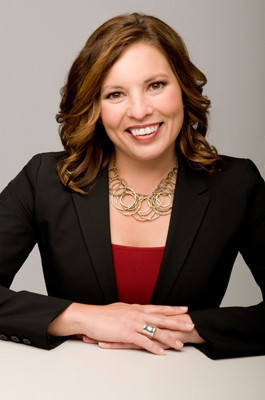
Jen Mueller

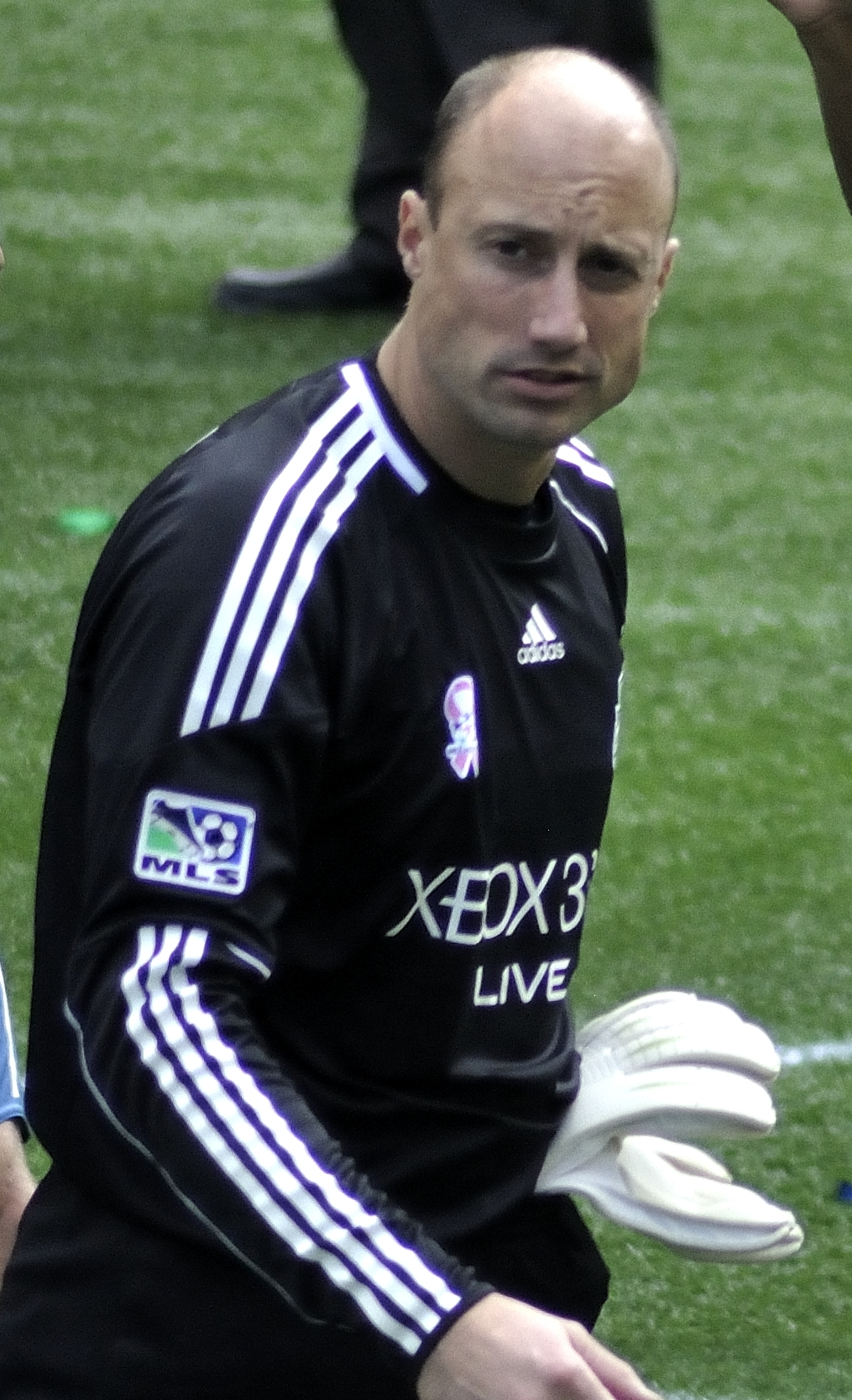
Kasey Keller

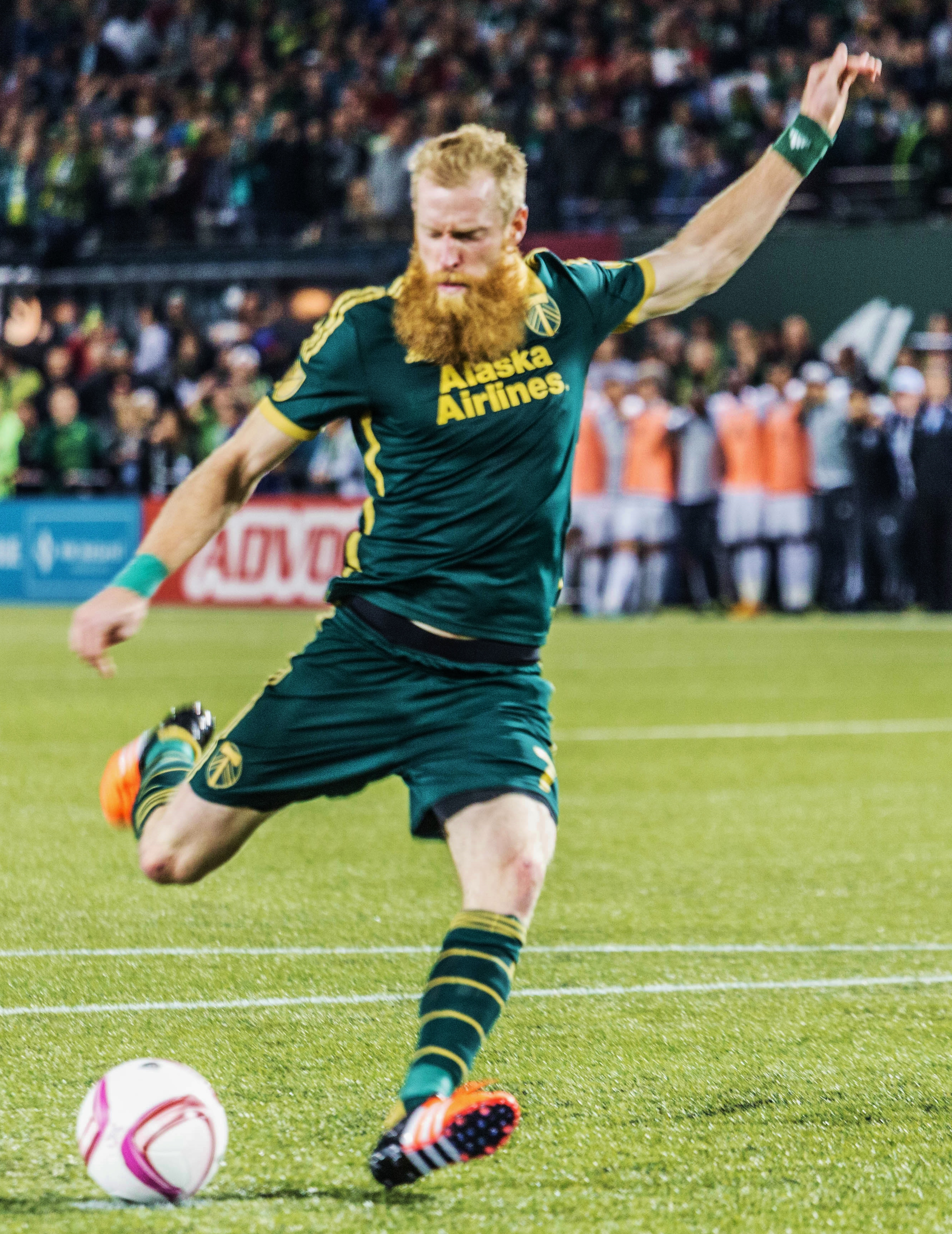
Nat Borchers

=== Gonzaga Bulldogs basketball/WCC basketball ===
- Greg Heister – Gonzaga and WCC basketball play-by-play
- Dan Dickau – Gonzaga and WCC basketball color commentator
- Richard Fox – Gonzaga and WCC basketball color commentator
- Francis Williams – college basketball color commentator and studio analyst

=== Seattle Mariners ===
- Brad Adam – Mariners pre-game and post-game host, basketball play-by-play, studio host and sideline reporter
- Aaron Goldsmith – Mariners play-by-play announcer
- Rick Rizzs – Mariners play-by-play announcer
- Mike Blowers – Mariners baseball analyst
- Dave Valle – Mariners baseball analyst
- Ryan Rowland-Smith – Mariners studio analyst
- Jen Mueller – host of Mariners All Access and sideline reporter
- Bill Krueger – senior baseball analyst
- Dave Niehaus – Mariners play-by-play announcer (died on November 10, 2010)
- Vinnie Richichi – Mariners sideline reporter
- Dave Sims – Mariners baseball play-by-play (2007–2024)

=== Portland Trail Blazers ===
- Kevin Calabro – Trail Blazers play-by-play
- Lamar Hurd – Trail Blazers color commentator
- Brooke Olzendam – Trail Blazers sideline reporter
- Michael Holton – Trail Blazers studio analyst

=== Seattle Sounders ===
- Keith Costigan – Sounders FC play-by-play
- Matt Johnson – Sounders FC play-by-play
- Kasey Keller – Sounders FC color commentator
- Steve Spanish – Sounders FC color commentator

=== Seattle Kraken ===
- John Forslund – Kraken play-by-play
- J. T. Brown – Kraken color commentator
- Eddie Olczyk – Kraken color commentator
- Ross Fletcher - Kraken studio host
- Alison Lukan – Kraken studio analyst/ice-level reporter
- Nick Olczyk – Kraken studio analyst

=== Portland Timbers ===
- Jake Zivin – Timbers play-by-play, host of Timbers in 30
- Ross Smith – Timbers color commentator
- Nat Borchers – Timbers color commentator
- Samantha Yarock – Timbers sideline reporter
- John Strong – Portland Timbers play-by-play (2007–2013)

=== Others ===
- Angie Mentink – host of many of the network's magazine show and a sideline reporter
- Warren Moon – host of Seahawks All Access
- Tom Glasgow – football and basketball play-by-play
- Jason Stiles – football analyst
- Taylor Barton – college football color commentator and studio analyst
- Shaun Alexander – host of The Shaun Alexander Show (2002–2004)
- Cara Capuano – anchor/reporter (2004–2008)
- Brian Davis – NBA host (2004–2008, now Oklahoma City Thunder play-by-play announcer for Fox Sports Oklahoma)
- Jason Gesser – football analyst and contributor for Cougars All Access (2009–2011)
- Don Poier – play-by-play announcer (died on January 21, 2005)
- Kerry Sayers – anchor/reporter (2002–2004, now at WSCR and WFLD in Chicago)
- Mack Strong – college football analyst and host of Mack Strong: Seahawks Insider (2008–2011)
- Sonny Sixkiller – college football analyst
- Lenny Wilkens – NBA expert and college basketball analyst (2006–2013)
- Nicole Zaloumis – sideline reporter (2008–2010, now with Sirius XM Radio)
