= KMAS (AM) =

- Shelton, Washington; United States
- Frequency: 1030 kHz
- Branding: KMAS Radio

Programming
- Format: Full service classic hits
- Affiliations: Seattle Mariners Radio Network; Seattle Seahawks; Seattle Kraken

Ownership
- Owner: Jeff Slakey, John & Rachel Hansen; (Ephrata Radio LLC)

History
- First air date: September 2, 1962
- Call sign meaning: "Mason County"

Technical information
- Licensing authority: FCC
- Facility ID: 60878
- Class: B
- Power: 10,000 watts day 1,000 watts night
- Transmitter coordinates: 47°13′16.3″N 123°4′50.5″W
- Translators: 101.9 K270CJ (Olympia); 103.3 K277CZ (Shelton)
- Repeater: 94.5 KRXY (Shelton)

Links
- Public license information: Public file; LMS
- Webcast: Listen live
- Website: www.tracingthefjord.com/kmas

KMAS (1030 AM) is a radio station broadcasting a full service classic hits format licensed to Shelton, Washington, United States. Its programming is also heard on translator station K277CZ (103.3 FM).

== History ==
The station first signed on the air in September 1962. It was founded by Mason County Broadcasting Co. and originally broadcast on 1280 kHz as a daytime-only station with a power of 1,000 watts. The call letters KMAS were chosen to represent Mason County, although some say KMAS pays homage to Shelton's "Christmastown" moniker, and the station's first studios were located at the current location of the Wallace-Kneeland interchange before Highway 101 came through.

In 1984, the station underwent a technical change, moving from 1280 kHz to 1030 kHz. This move allowed KMAS to increase its signal coverage and eventually transition to 24-hour broadcasting, serving as the primary local news and information source for the South Puget Sound region. The daytime power is 10,000 watts and 1,000 watts at night.

In 2007, the station was acquired by Olympic Broadcasting. During that time the station added its FM translator and jumped around until landing on its current frequency 103.3 MHz. On January 3, 2012, KMAS changed their format from oldies to news/talk.

On January 12, 2016, KMAS rebranded to iFiberOne NewsRadio as a result of merging with local cable/fiber optic provider iFIBER Communications.

In 2023, longtime morning show host Jeff Slakey, along with John and Rachel Hansen, purchased KMAS from iFIBER Communications. The station transitioned back to a music station now playing music from 1965–2025 and across all genres. Slakey has been doing the morning show on KMAS for almost 20 years.

In 2024, KMAS was nominated for and won the Shelton Mason County Chamber of Commerce business of the year award.

The station is known for being connected to the Mason County community with interviews with local elected officials, city and county employees, business leaders, school districts and other members of the community. In addition to covering the Shelton School District, the station covers news, scores and updates for other local districts, including North Mason High School and Mary M. Knight High School.

Beyond high school sports, KMAS served as a local affiliate for the Seattle Kraken, Seattle Mariners, and Seattle Seahawks radio networks.

In September 2026, Ephrata Radio announced its acquisition of 94.5 KRXY and assumed operations of the station under a local marketing agreement, converting it to an FM simulcast of KMAS. The agreement also includes its FM translator K270CJ in Olympia.
