= KBRC =

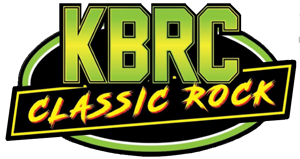
- Mount Vernon, Washington; United States
- Broadcast area: Skagit County, Washington
- Frequency: 1430 kHz
- Branding: Classic Rock KBRC

Programming
- Format: Classic rock

Ownership
- Owner: J & J Broadcasting, INC

History
- First air date: December 11, 1946

Technical information
- Licensing authority: FCC
- Facility ID: 39496
- Class: B
- Power: 5,000 watts (day); 1,000 watts (night)
- Transmitter coordinates: 48°25′22″N 122°21′15″W
- Translator: 102.9 K275CV (Mount Vernon)

Links
- Public license information: Public file; LMS
- Webcast: Listen live
- Website: www.kbrcradio.com

KBRC (1430 AM) is a commercial radio station in Mount Vernon, Washington, and serving Skagit County. It airs a classic rock format and is owned by John and Julia Di Meo. Studios are located on Freeway Drive in Mount Vernon.

By day, KBRC is powered at 5,000 watts non-directional. But to protect other stations on 1430 AM from interference at night, it reduces power to 1,000 watts and uses a directional antenna with a two-tower array. Programming is also heard on 250-watt FM translator K275CV at 102.9 MHz.

== General information ==
KBRC signed on the air on December 11, 1946. It was owned by Leo H. Beckley and was the first radio station to broadcast in the Skagit Valley region. Through the 1950s, 60s and 70s, the station aired a full service, middle of the road (MOR) format of popular adult music, news and sports. By the 1980s, it switched to adult contemporary music.

In the 1990s, the station flipped to a classic hits-oldies format of music from the 1960s, 70s and 80s. KBRC would also broadcast local Skagit County news as well as hourly updates from ABC News Radio.

On November 19, 2018, KBRC changed its format from classic hits to classic rock. It began promoting its FM translator as its primary dial position.

Sports are an integral part of KBRC. Local Skagit County high school sports contests are aired, as well as professional teams such as Seattle Seahawks football and Seattle Mariners baseball. College sports, including the University of Washington Huskies football and basketball programs are also broadcast.
