= Everett Fitzhugh =

American sportscaster

- Born: January 6, 1989 (age 37); Detroit, Michigan, U.S.
- Education: Bowling Green State University
- Occupation: Radio sportscaster
- Years active: 2000s–present
- Known for: First African American broadcaster in the NHL
- Spouse: Shelly Pinto (m. 2021)
- Sports commentary career
- Genre: Play-by-play
- Sport: Ice hockey

Everett Fitzhugh (born January 6, 1989) is an American sportscaster who is the radio play-by-play announcer for the Seattle Kraken of the National Hockey League.

== Early life ==
Fitzhugh is African American. He was born in Detroit and was adopted by his mother, a single parent. He grew up in northwest Detroit. He attended Pioneer High School in Ann Arbor, Michigan and Bowling Green State University. He first developed an interest in hockey when, as a third grader, he watched a Detroit Red Wings–Edmonton Oilers game and noticed that the Oilers had two Black players, Mike Grier and Georges Laraque.

== ECHL career ==
He has been the play-by-play announcer for the ECHL's Cincinnati Cyclones and Youngstown Phantoms of the United States Hockey League, and the play-by-play announcer and color commentator for the Bowling Green Falcons. Fitzhugh has also served as the Cyclones' director of media relations. He received the ECHL Award of Excellence for Media Relations in 2017, following the completion of his second year in the league. He was also on the crew for the 2018 ECHL All-Star Game on NHL Network.

In 2018, at John Walton's invitation, he announced play-by-play for a Washington Capitals preseason game against the Boston Bruins.

In February 2020, Ryan S. Clark of The Athletic reported that Fitzhugh was the only Black play-by-play announcer at any professional level of North American ice hockey. Kristen Ropp, the Cyclones' general manager and vice president, praised his work ethic and willingness to play multiple roles to support and promote the team. Clark wrote, "The day an NHL club hires Fitzhugh to become their play-by-play announcer will become a landmark moment for a sport that has grappled with constructs like diversity."

== Seattle Kraken ==
Tod Leiweke, the Kraken's CEO, personally reached out to Fitzhugh after reading The Athletic's profile of him as an ECHL announcer. Leiweke received "a glowing recommendation" for Fitzhugh from retired NBC NHL announcer Mike Emrick. The team hired Fitzhugh as its first team broadcaster in August 2020. He became the first full-time African American broadcaster in NHL history. The Seattle Times disabled its comments on its story about Fitzhugh's hiring; an editor's note blamed "too many comments violating our code of conduct."

In 2020, Penguin Random House Canada hired Fitzhugh to narrate the audiobook of Willie O'Ree’s autobiography, Willie: The Game-Changing Story of the NHL's First Black Player. Fitzhugh recorded the audiobook in four days at a studio in downtown Cincinnati, just before moving to Seattle to begin working for the Kraken.

Fitzhugh has appeared at public speaking engagements and in promotional videos for the Kraken. In February 2021, a reporter wrote that the Kraken's YouTube channel "is nearly the Fitz show with AMAs, interviews, and a pre-draft show greeting would-be fans", largely hosted by Fitzhugh.

On February 17, 2022, Fitzhugh and J. T. Brown called the Kraken's game against the Winnipeg Jets on Root Sports Northwest. The pairing was the first all-Black TV broadcast in NHL history.

In his time with the Kraken, Fitzhugh has also been named the 2023 National Sports Media Association (NSMA) Washington State Sportscaster of the Year, and won a Northwest Regional Emmy Award.

== Personal life ==
Fitzhugh married Shelly Pinto on October 15, 2021.

His broadcasting inspirations include Detroit announcers Ernie Harwell, George Blaha, Ken Daniels, and Mickey Redmond, and the broadcasters on Hockey Night in Canada, which is available on CBET in Detroit.
