= Ross Fletcher =

English sports presenter

Ross Fletcher is an English sports presenter and commentator known for his work with BBC Radio and Seattle Sounders FC. From 2021 to 2024, he hosted Root Sports Northwest's coverage of Seattle Kraken ice hockey games.

== Career ==
=== BBC ===
Fletcher had a passion for radio at a young age and at 14 years old, he was the runner-up in a competition for aspiring broadcasters hosted by Garth Crooks's Go program on the original Radio 5. He gained experience at BBC Radio Derby between the ages of 16 and 18 on an unpaid basis. Fletcher began reading sports bulletins for the station while attending the University of Sheffield. He eventually earned his own program doing sports and music on Saturdays. At the age of 22, Fletcher became the voice of Derby County for BBC Radio Derby. He also spent 5 years reporting for BBC Radio 5 Live and BBC Radio 5 Live Sports Extra.

=== Major League Soccer ===
Beginning in 2012, Fletcher replaced Arlo White as the play-by-play voice of Seattle Sounders FC for local English radio and television broadcasts. He worked alongside former Seattle goalkeeper and color commentator Kasey Keller on the broadcasts.

On 22 October 2015, it was announced that he and the club would part ways at the end of the 2015 season. He called his last match for the club, a playoff series against FC Dallas that ended in a penalty shootout, on 8 November 2015.

=== Seattle Kraken ===
Fletcher joined Root Sports Northwest in 2021 to host pre-game and post-game coverage of Seattle Kraken broadcasts for the team's inaugural National Hockey League season.

Fletcher left Root Sports in 2024, after it lost the rights to Kraken games. He joined Herd Freed Hartz, a Seattle-based recruiting firm, as an executive recruiter.
