= KTKN =

Radio station in Ketchikan, Alaska

Coordinates: 55°20′20.8″N 131°38′19.1″W

- Ketchikan, Alaska; United States
- Broadcast area: Alaska Panhandle
- Frequency: 930 kHz

Programming
- Format: Talk/Hot adult contemporary
- Affiliations: American Top 40, ABC Radio News

Ownership
- Owner: Alaska Broadcast Communications

Technical information
- Licensing authority: FCC
- Class: B
- Power: 5,000 watts day; 1,000 watts night
- Translators: 93.3 K227DQ (Ketchikan–Bear Valley); 97.5 K248AI (Ketchikan)

Links
- Public license information: Public file; LMS
- Webcast: Listen Live
- Website: www.iheart.com/live/am-930-ktkn-8347

KTKN (930 AM) is an American commercial radio station airing talk and hot adult contemporary music programming in Ketchikan, Alaska.

It is owned and operated by Alaska Broadcast Communications. The studios are at 526 Stedman Street in Ketchikan, with sister station KGTW and next door from its other sister station KFMJ. KTKN programming is also heard on 97.5 FM from translator K248AI; the station holds a permit for a second translator facility.

== History ==
The current KTKN license, which dates to 1942, is the successor of the first station to operate in Ketchikan.

=== KGBU ===
KGBU was granted its first license to operate on July 29, 1926. It was owned by Roy Thornton, with the licensee soon changed to the Alaska Radio Service Company. As part of General Order 40 in 1928, it relocated from 610 to 900 kilohertz.

A fire on December 26, 1931, destroyed the station and its two transmitters.

KGBU affiliated with the Mutual Broadcasting System in November 1940 and was its first affiliate in the territory, receiving Mutual programs from the network's affiliates in Seattle and Tacoma. Alongside Mutual came the Don Lee Network hookup, giving the West Coast regional network its 33rd outlet. It was the first time any Alaska radio station had been affiliated with one of the major networks.

In early 1942, KGBU went off the air permanently. Its owners, Mr. and Mrs. Jim Britton, turned over the property to a local bank, saying that wartime conditions had caused the withdrawal of national advertising accounts and made it impossible to continue.

=== KTKN at wartime ===
On July 17, 1942, Edwin A. Kraft applied to the Federal Communications Commission for a new radio station to be located in Ketchikan and using the facilities, including studio, of KGBU, which the station's creditors were to sell to him. Kraft owned radio station KINY in Juneau and the Seattle-based Northwest Radio Advertising Company. The FCC granted the application on August 18.

Ketchikan's new radio station debuted in a time of turmoil. In July 1942, the Board of War Communications by order took control of all civilian communications facilities in Alaska, including the three remaining radio stations in the territory. Additionally, a wartime freeze order meant that the FCC only authorized six new radio stations all year, just one of them requiring new equipment. Regular programs over KTKN began on November 14, 1942. Through the Office of War Information, KTKN aired transcriptions of network programs flown to Alaska by military planes for the benefit of soldiers stationed there. The OWI purchased eight hours of air time a day on the territory's four stations in this endeavor. Later in the war, KTKN and KINY presented programs produced by Army, Navy and Coast Guard combat forces.

=== Peacetime expansion ===
After the war, Kraft became a key player in Alaska radio, and KTKN along with him. The Kraft stations were two of the three charter members of Alaska's first state network, the Alaska Broadcasting System, which was announced in September 1946; they were joined by KFQD in Anchorage, owned by William J. Wagner. The next year, Wagner bought KTKN and KINY for $140,000 as Kraft left the territory to look after his interests in Seattle; the acquisition brought Wagner's station total to five, as he held construction permits for outlets in Fairbanks and Seward that took to the air in 1948. The entire network was now aligned with CBS; they added NBC in 1950, broadcasting the network's shows from tape recordings made in Seattle and by ACS shortwave pickup.

In 1953, KTKN sought a power increase from 1,000 to 5,000 watts. The application was contested by the second station to set up in Ketchikan, KABI, which said soil conductivity in Alaska meant that the operation would not meet FCC standards. KTKN later withdrew the application.

In 1956, station manager Robert C. Mehan bought KTKN from Wagner for $40,000. Two years later, Mehan sold the station to the Midnight Sun Broadcasting Company, which divested itself of KABI, for $50,000. The entire Midnight Sun group, including AM-TV combos in Anchorage and Fairbanks, was sold for $1.2 million in 1960 to All-Alaska Broadcasters, which became the new Midnight Sun Broadcasters in 1962. The station was finally approved in 1965 for the daytime power increase to 5,000 watts that had first been pursued 12 years earlier, though it would have to replace its tower after it was toppled in a Thanksgiving Day wind storm in 1968. During that time, Midnight Sun expanded into Ketchikan cable with the first-ever television service in Alaska, KATV.

=== After 1980 ===
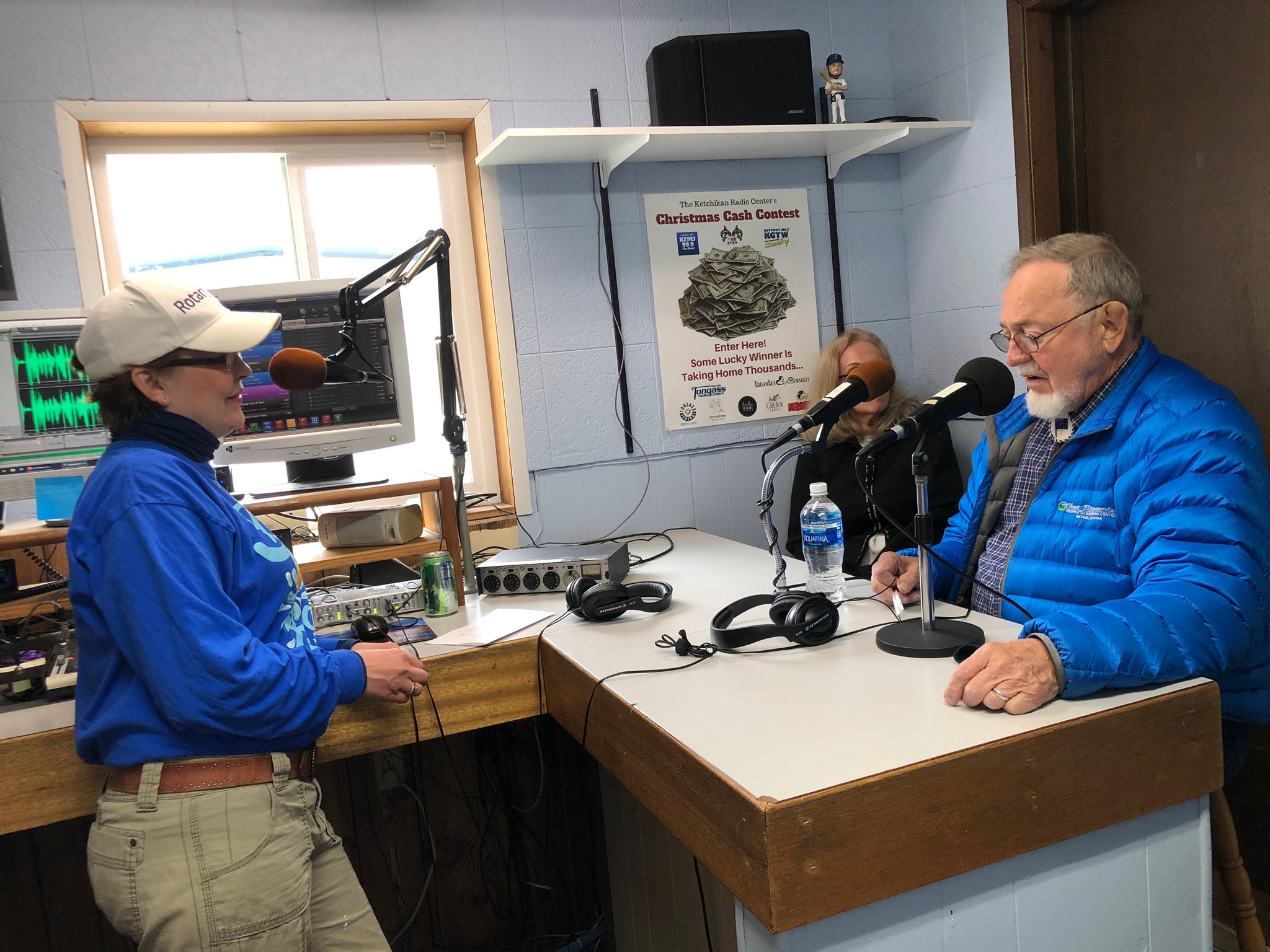
Michelle O'Brien interviews Congressmember Don Young in 2020.

Midnight Sun attempted to sell itself in 1977, but years of petitions with a citizen group known as Alaskans for Better Media scuppered the sale. In addition, it was not until a 1980 settlement agreement with ABM that the company's broadcast licenses were renewed. In 1980, the group finally began to sell off its holdings piecemeal, beginning with the Anchorage and Fairbanks television stations and concluding with KTKN being sold to Gateway Broadcasting for $350,000 in 1981.

KTKN, its sister station KGTW, and other broadcast holdings of E. Roy Paschal were sold to Richard and Sharon Burns, Australian citizens, in 2017, in exchange for the assumption of Paschal's liabilities; the Burns already owned 20 percent of the stations. The Burns had been running Alaska Broadcast Communications for the previous decade, including the Ketchikan Radio Center with sister stations KGTW and KFMJ (which is commonly operated but separately owned).
