= KRXY =

Radio station in Shelton–Olympia, Washington

Simulcasting KMAS Shelton
- Shelton, Washington; United States
- Broadcast area: Olympia, Washington
- Frequency: 94.5 MHz
- Branding: KMAS Radio

Programming
- Format: Full service classic hits

Ownership
- Owner: Olympia Broadcasters, Inc. (Sale pending to Ephrata Radio LLC)
- Operator: Ephrata Radio

History
- First air date: 1998
- Call sign meaning: "Roxy" (previous branding)

Technical information
- Licensing authority: FCC
- Facility ID: 82527
- Class: A
- ERP: 830 watts
- HAAT: 271.9 meters (892 ft)
- Transmitter coordinates: 47°8′20.00″N 123°8′23.00″W

Links
- Public license information: Public file; LMS
- Webcast: Listen live
- Website: KRXY Online

KRXY (94.5 FM) is a radio station broadcasting a full service classic hits music format, simulcasting KMAS 1030 AM Shelton. Licensed to Shelton, Washington, United States, the station is currently owned by Olympia Broadcasters, Inc. The transmitter is on Kamilche Hill.

== History ==
The station previously carried a adult hits format branded as 94.5 Roxy. In September 2026, Olympia Broadcasters—which had laid off its employees in July 2026 and filed for chapter 7 bankruptcy—sold KRXY to Ephrata Radio LLC for $27,500. Ephrata immediately took over operations of the station under a local marketing agreement, converting it to an FM simulcast of its AM classic hits station 1030 KMAS.
