= Nick Olczyk =

American sports analyst (born 1996)

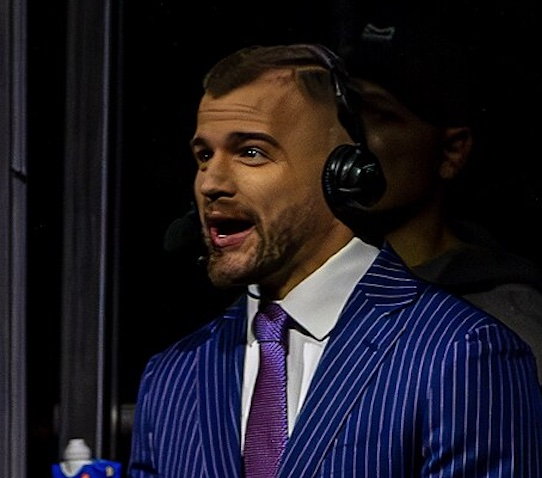
- Olczyk reporting during a Seattle Kraken game in 2023.
- Born: October 4, 1996 (age 30); Los Angeles, California, U.S.
- Occupation: Sports analyst
- Employer: Utah Mammoth

Nick Olczyk (/ˈoʊltʃɪk/; born October 4, 1996) is an American sports analyst for the Utah Mammoth. He previously worked as a broadcaster for the Seattle Kraken, the Chicago Blackhawks, and the Indy Fuel, the Blackhawks' minor-league affiliate.

== College playing career ==
Olczyk played forward on the Colorado College Tigers men's ice hockey team, appearing in 17 games in two seasons. Citing his lack of ice time and the school's lack of a communications department, he left the school in 2019 to pursue professional experience in broadcasting.

== Chicago Blackhawks/Indy Fuel ==
After leaving college, Olczyk became a broadcaster for the Indy Fuel of the ECHL, a minor-league affiliate of the Chicago Blackhawks. Andrew Smith, the Fuel's play-by-play analyst and Olczyk's broadcast partner, said that Olczyk was an "NHL-quality analyst" and predicted that he would work for a major league team "sooner rather than later." On April 9, 2021, Olczyk and his father Eddie Olczyk, a Blackhawks broadcaster at the time, called the Fuel's game against the Fort Wayne Komets. It was the first time the Fuel had used a three-man broadcast booth.

In addition to his duties as a Fuel broadcaster, Olczyk worked as an associate producer for NBC Sports Chicago and for NHL on TNT broadcasts. He worked at NBC Sports's Stamford, Connecticut facility, producing coverage of the 2020 Summer Olympics and the 2022 Winter Olympics.

Olczyk was a fill-in radio analyst for the Blackhawks during the 2021–22 season, making his debut on a November 9, 2021 game against the Pittsburgh Penguins. On January 22, 2022, Olczyk made his NHL television debut on NBC Sports Chicago, filling in for his father during a game against the Minnesota Wild, due to his father's illness shortly before the broadcast began. He also called the game on January 24 against the Colorado Avalanche, telling Pat Foley on-air before the game, "The good news is Pat, you still have an Olczyk, just a little younger and a tad better looking."

== Seattle Kraken ==
On August 16, 2022, the Seattle Kraken announced that they had hired Olczyk and rehired Alison Lukan for their broadcast team. Both are expected to contribute to television and radio broadcasts and to the team's mobile app content.

== Utah Mammoth ==
On September 4, 2024, Olczyk and Dominic Moore were announced as television analysts for the inaugural season of the Utah Mammoth on KUPX-TV.

== Personal life ==
Nick's father, Eddie Olczyk, is a former ice hockey player and a broadcaster for the Seattle Kraken. His uncle, Rick Olczyk, is the Kraken's assistant general manager. His brother, Eddie III, is an amateur scout for the Kraken.
