= KIFW =

- Sitka, Alaska; United States
- Broadcast area: Metro Sitka
- Frequency: 1230 kHz
- Branding: 1230 KIFW

Programming
- Format: Full service; classic hits; oldies
- Affiliations: ABC News Radio

Ownership
- Owner: Alaska Broadcast Communications
- Sister stations: KSBZ

History
- First air date: November 24, 1949

Technical information
- Licensing authority: FCC
- Facility ID: 60516
- Class: B
- Power: 1,000 watts unlimited
- Transmitter coordinates: 57°3′25.7″N 135°20′8.4″W
- Translator: 102.3 K272FV (Sitka)

Links
- Public license information: Public file; LMS
- Webcast: Listen live; Listen live (MP3)
- Website: www.sitkaradio.com

KIFW (1230 AM) is a radio station broadcasting a full service format, including classic hits and oldies. Licensed to Sitka, Alaska, United States, the station serves the Alaska Panhandle. The station is owned by Alaska Broadcast Communications, and features programming from ABC News Radio.

The studios for KIFW and its sister station KSBZ are at 611 Lake Street in Sitka.

== Programming ==
KIFW airs a "Problem Corner" show where listeners call concerning local issues, among other subjects. KIFW also broadcasts Sitka High School sports games and airs live coverage of the Sitka Salmon Derby. In January 2000, KSBZ switched to a country music format. In 2006, KSBZ switched formats again, this time to an active rock format, before finally settling on a classic rock format a year later.

The station formerly broadcast adult contemporary music. In January 2020, KIFW transferred all its adult contemporary programming over to KSBZ which relaunched as a hot adult contemporary radio station, rebranding as "Mix 103"; KIFW meanwhile inherited KSBZ's former classic rock programming with a classic hits format, continuing to be known on-air as The Sound of Sitka.
