= KTKU =

Radio station in Juneau, Alaska

Coordinates: 58.329°N 134.473°W

- Juneau, Alaska; United States
- Broadcast area: Juneau, Alaska
- Frequency: 105.1 (MHz)
- Branding: Taku 105

Programming
- Format: Country

Ownership
- Owner: Alaska Broadcast Communications

History
- Call sign meaning: Refers to the Taku Inlet

Technical information
- Licensing authority: FCC
- Facility ID: 32950
- Class: A
- ERP: 3,800 watts
- HAAT: -323 meters

Links
- Public license information: Public file; LMS
- Webcast: Listen Live
- Website: www.taku105.com

KTKU (105.1 FM, "Taku 105") is a radio station in Juneau, Alaska. Owned by Alaska Broadcast Communications, it broadcasts a country music format.

Its studios are located alongside its sister stations at 3161 Channel Drive.

== History ==
KTKU signed on in 1984 as the first commercial FM station in Juneau with a top 40 format, under the ownership of KJNO owner Roy Paschal. The late Dennis Egan, the former mayor of Juneau and Juneau's former state senator, was the station's first general manager, while Rick Rydell served as the morning show host.

The station has since switched to country.
