= KINY =

Radio station in Juneau, Alaska, United States

- Juneau, Alaska; United States
- Broadcast area: Alaska Panhandle
- Frequency: 800 kHz C-QUAM AM stereo
- Branding: Hometown Radio 800 and 94.9 KINY

Programming
- Format: Classic hits
- Affiliations: ABC News Radio; Seattle Mariners; Seattle Seahawks

Ownership
- Owner: Frontier Media; (BTC USA Holdings Management Inc.)
- Sister stations: KSUP, KXXJ

History
- First air date: May 31, 1935
- Call sign meaning: Randomly issued by the FCC

Technical information
- Licensing authority: FCC
- Facility ID: 823
- Class: B
- Power: 10,000 watts day; 7,600 watts night
- Transmitter coordinates: 58°18′3.55″N 134°26′33.02″W
- Translator: see below

Links
- Public license information: Public file; LMS
- Webcast: Listen live
- Website: www.kinyradio.com

KINY (800 AM) is a radio station licensed to Juneau, Alaska, serving southeast Alaska. Owned by Frontier Media, it broadcasts a classic hits format.

== History ==
KINY began broadcasting on May 31, 1935, at 7:30 p.m. It was located in the Goldstein Building until 1939, when the building was destroyed by fire on February 8, 1939. The Decker Building in downtown Juneau then served as KINY's headquarters for decades. The station moved into the building on October 28, 1940. The Decker Building burned down in June 1984.

KINY and its sister station KSUP were bought by Alaska Broadcast Communications in June 2008.

In October 2022, KINY, sister stations KSUP and KXXJ, and eight translators were sold to BTC USA Holdings Management, a company majority owned by Cliff Dumas' Broadcast 2 Podcast Inc., with a 20% minority stake held by Bryan Woodruff's Local First Media Group. After the sale, the station began to back away from its previous full service positioning in 2024, with Dumas stating that he wanted the station to have a "stronger musical identity". This resulted in the cancellation of its long-running call-in show Problem Corner (which was converted to a weekly podcast in February 2024), and the layoffs of its two full-time news reporters in May 2024. Most of the station's online news content consisted primarily of wire stories, press releases, and articles created with generative AI.

In October 2024, Problem Corner was revived as a weekday show; Dumas cited listener feedback for the reversal, and explained that "the intention has always been to bring it back in some form. It was just finding the right combination of web and social and broadcast to kind of bring it up to a modern standard." With Wade Bryson (who had hosted the show since 2008) stepping down due to health issues, KINY afternoon host Mike Lane would succeed him as host (the show would also be moved from its previous 11 a.m. time slot to 1 p.m. to become part of his existing shift), with plans for rotating co-hosts.

== Programming ==
- News of the North - news about Alaska.
- Capital Chat, a local-events show for the Juneau, Alaska area hosted by Steve Holloway.
- Problem Corner, a program hosted by Mike Lane that features listener phone-ins, typically for buying and selling goods, but also discussions of local news, events, and other topics. Running uninterrupted for around 70 years, it is Alaska's longest-running live radio show.

Notable regular syndicated broadcasts include:

- The Mike Harvey Show, a syndicated requested oldies show hosted by Mike Harvey.
- Super Gold, hosted by Mike Harvey.
- American Top 40 with Casey Kasem.

KINY carries news from ABC News Radio and live sports from the Seattle Mariners and the Seattle Seahawks.

== Translators ==
Logo used until June 2008.

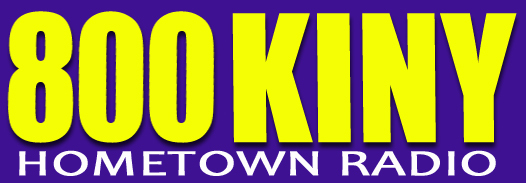
Logo from June 2008 until late 2012.

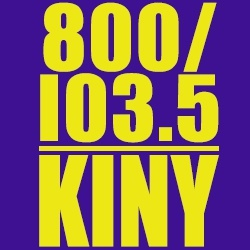
Logo from late 2016 to late 2018 advertising the 103.5 signal as the primary translator.

In addition to the main station, KINY has an additional five translators to widen its broadcast area.

Broadcast translators for KINY
| Call sign | Frequency | City of license | FID | FCC info |
|---|---|---|---|---|
| K280DX | 103.9 FM | Angoon, Alaska | 821 | LMS |
| K279AF | 103.7 FM | Haines, Alaska | 82616 | LMS |
| K280ED | 103.9 FM | Hoonah, Alaska | 777 | LMS |
| K235DA | 94.9 FM | Juneau, Alaska | 202194 | LMS |
| K278GE | 103.5 FM | Kake, Alaska | 32949 | LMS |
| K284AM | 104.7 FM | Skagway, Alaska | 137761 | LMS |
