= KXXJ =

- Juneau, Alaska; United States
- Broadcast area: Southeast Alaska
- Frequency: 1330 kHz
- Branding: KXJ 1330/93.3

Programming
- Format: Classic hits

Ownership
- Owner: Local First Media Group; (BTC USA Holdings Management Inc.)
- Sister stations: KINY; KSUP

History
- First air date: 2006
- Former call signs: KTNL (2006–2007); KXLJ (2007–2011)
- Call sign meaning: "hat tip" to LA's KHJ

Technical information
- Licensing authority: FCC
- Facility ID: 161171
- Class: B
- Power: 10,000 watts day; 3,000 watts night
- Transmitter coordinates: 58°18′3.8″N 134°26′32.4″W
- Translator: 93.3 K227DP (Juneau)

Links
- Public license information: Public file; LMS
- Webcast: Listen live
- Website: www.kxjradio.com

KXXJ (1330 AM) is a classic hits formatted broadcast radio station licensed to Juneau, Alaska, serving Southeast Alaska. KXXJ is owned and operated by Local First Media Group. The station can also be heard on FM translator K227DP at 93.3 FM.

== History ==
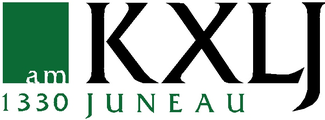
Logo used until July 2011.

Launched in 2006 as KTNL, in 2007, the call sign was changed to KXLJ, which became an affiliate for Air America. When Air America went under in 2010, KXLJ became an ESPN Radio affiliate.

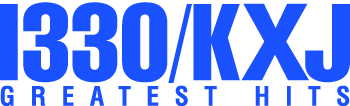
Logo used before translator sign on.

On May 12, 2011, Seattle Streaming Radio, LLC sold KXLJ to Alaska Broadcast Communications for $250,000. On July 1, 2011, KXLJ changed formats to classic hits as "1330 KXJ", a "nod" to Los Angeles's KHJ from the 1960s and 1970s, under a new KXXJ call sign.

In October 2022, KXXJ, KINY, and KSUP were sold to Bryan Woodruff, Ted Ellis and Cliff Dumas of Local First Media Group for $1.3 million.
