= Alison Lukan =

American ice hockey broadcaster and sportswriter

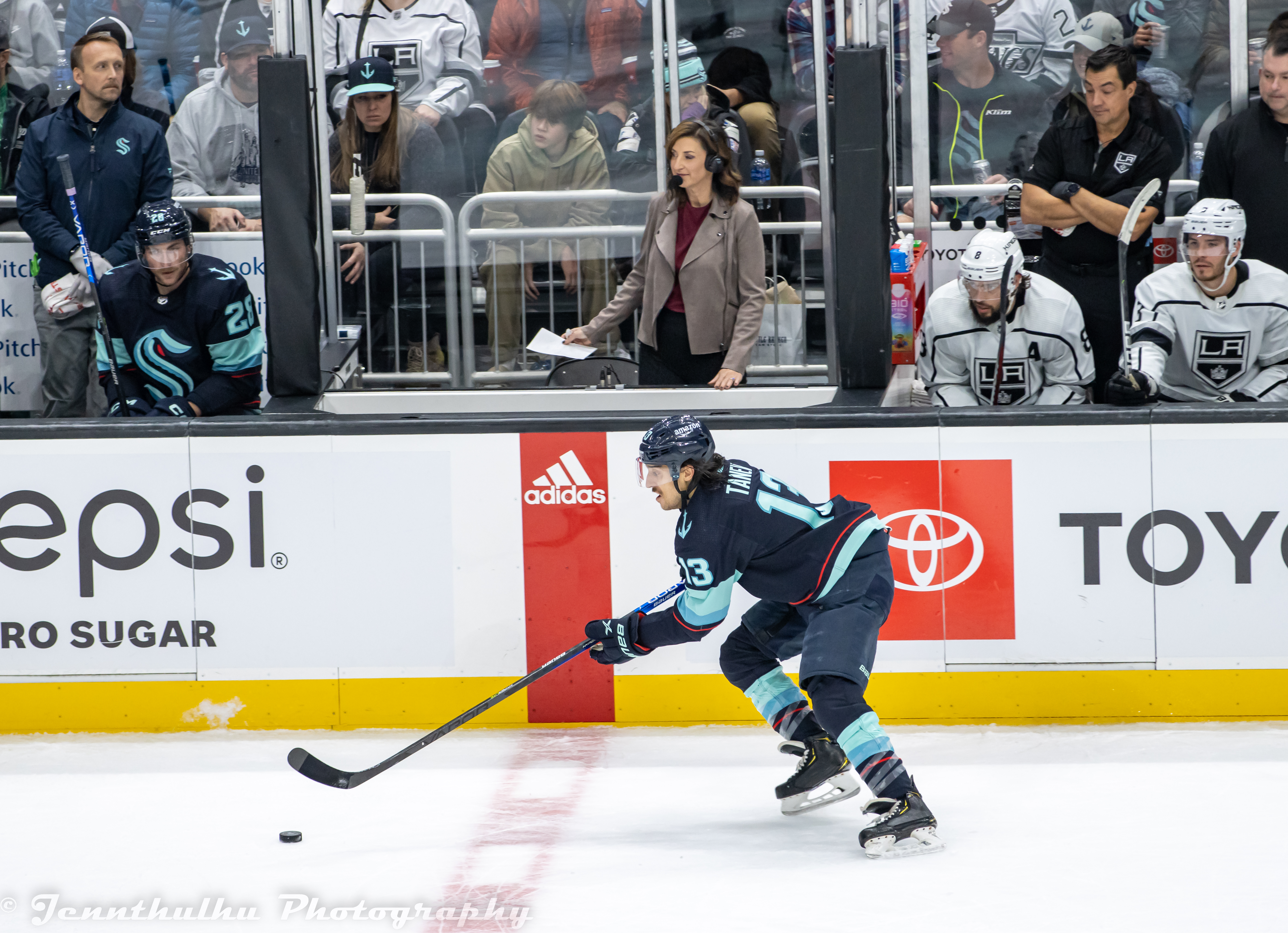
Alison Lukan during a Seattle Kraken game in 2022.

Alison Lukan is an American ice hockey broadcaster and sportswriter. She is currently an analyst for the Seattle Kraken and Seattle Torrent. Lukan has previously written for The Athletic about the Columbus Blue Jackets and about Ohio State Buckeyes men's and women's hockey. She contributes "Analytics with Alison" articles for the Kraken for the National Hockey League's official website.

== Early life and education ==
Lukan grew up in Columbus, Ohio. She attended the University of Richmond, where she received a bachelor's degree in 1996 from the Jepson School of Leadership Studies. For two years, she performed as the mascot of the Richmond Spiders.

== Career ==
Lukan has worked for Fox Sports Ohio. She joined The Athletic in 2017 to cover the Columbus Blue Jackets. She gained attention for her technically savvy approach to sports analytics, including attendance at hockey analytics conferences and teaching herself R. She organized the Columbus Blue Jackets Hockey Analytics Conference and has been nicknamed the "analytics queen" for being one of the few visible women in her profession. She has co-hosted Too Many Men, a women-run podcast about hockey, since February 2020.

Lukan joined the Seattle Kraken's broadcast team for its inaugural season. She writes articles for the team's official website, provides analysis on the radio, and presents data visualizations originally on television coverage during pre-game, intermission, and post-game segments. For road games starting on March 5, 2022, she joined John Forslund as an analyst in the television broadcast booth for the Kraken while primary analyst J. T. Brown was in COVID-19 protocols.

The Kraken announced in August 2022 that Lukan would return to the broadcast team during the 2022–23 season. Lukan continued to work on Kraken games when the team set up its own broadcaster, the Kraken Hockey Network, starting in the 2024–25 season.

Lukan joined the broadcasting crew for the Seattle Torrent in its inaugural season.
