= J. T. Brown (ice hockey) =

American ice hockey player (born 1990)

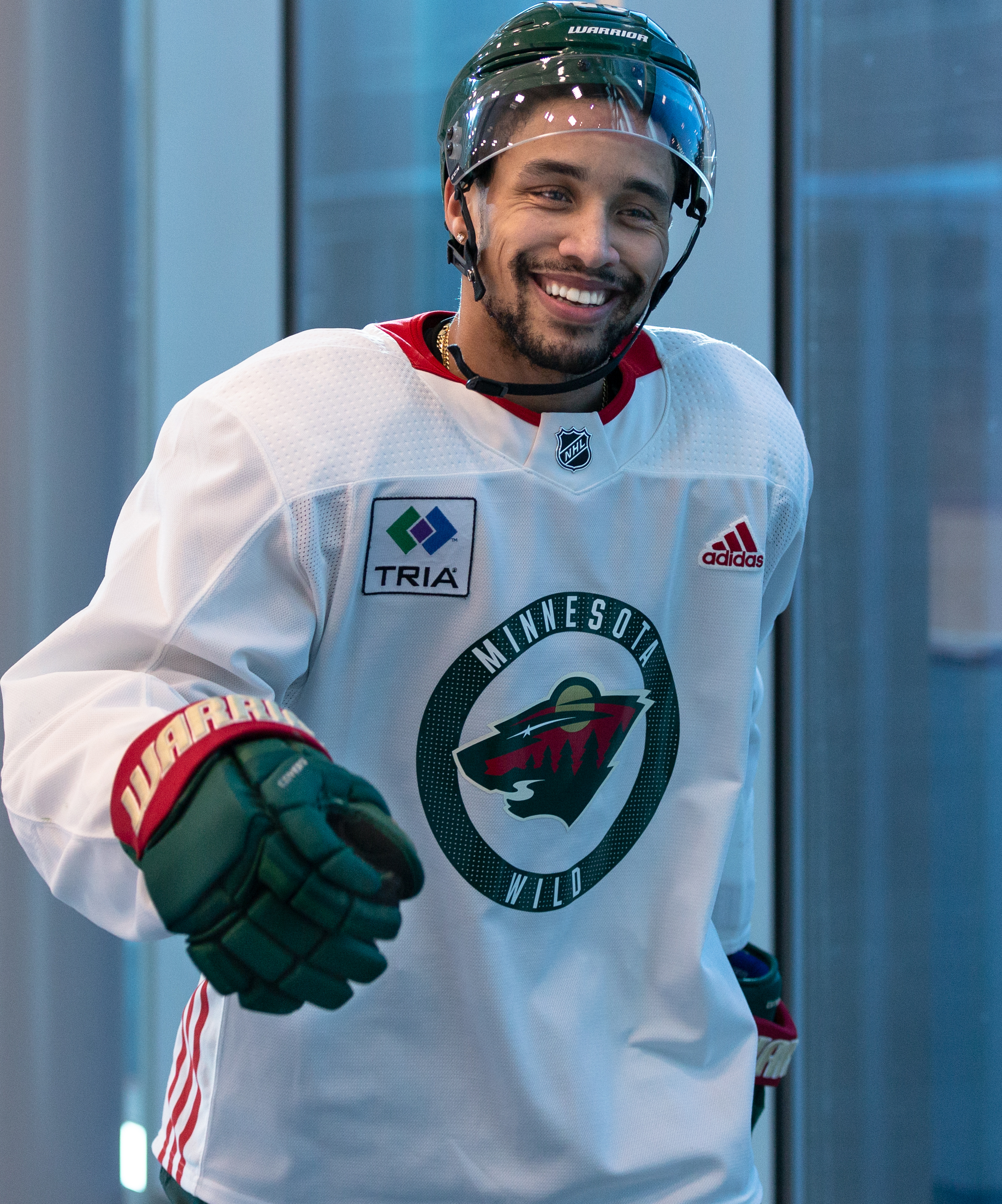
- Brown with the Minnesota Wild in January 2019
- Born: July 2, 1990 (age 36) Burnsville, Minnesota, U.S.
- Height: 5 ft 10 in (178 cm)
- Weight: 175 lb (79 kg; 12 st 7 lb)
- Position: Right wing
- Shot: Right
- Played for: Tampa Bay Lightning; Anaheim Ducks; Minnesota Wild
- National team: United States
- NHL draft: Undrafted
- Playing career: 2010–2021

Joshua Thomas Brown (born July 2, 1990) is an American former professional ice hockey right winger who played for the Tampa Bay Lightning, Anaheim Ducks and Minnesota Wild. He is a TV analyst for the Seattle Kraken.

== Playing career ==
=== Collegiate ===
Brown attended the University of Minnesota Duluth after playing junior hockey in the United States Hockey League (USHL) with the Waterloo Black Hawks. In 2011, he was named the Most Outstanding Player after winning the 2011 Frozen Four national championship with the Bulldogs.

=== Professional ===
==== Tampa Bay Lightning ====
Undrafted in the NHL, Brown signed a two-year, entry-level contract with the Tampa Bay Lightning on March 28, 2012. Upon signing with Tampa Bay, Lightning General Manager Steve Yzerman said, "I'm anxious to see him play." On March 31, 2012, Brown made his NHL debut in Tampa Bay's 3–2 overtime victory against the Winnipeg Jets. On April 7, he recorded his first career NHL assist in a 4–3 overtime win, also coming against the Winnipeg Jets.

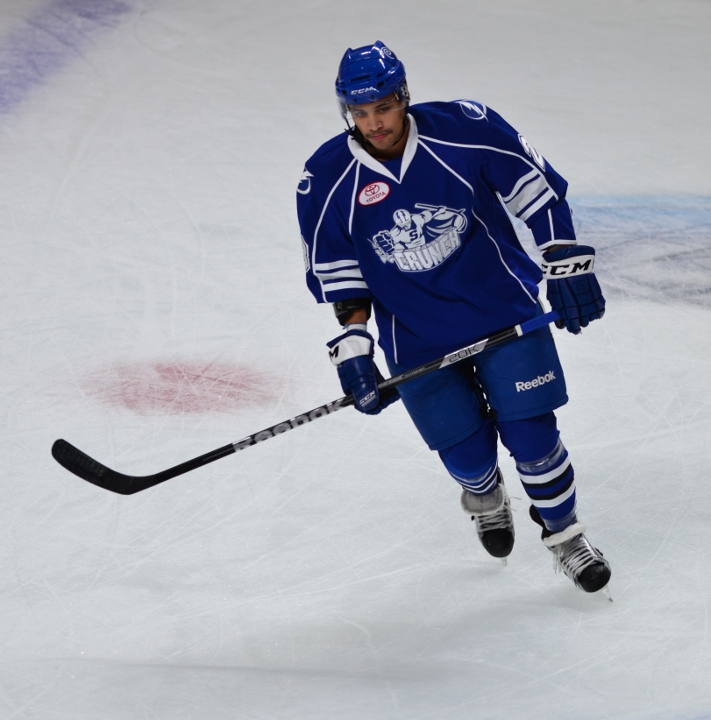
Brown with the Syracuse Crunch in 2012

On September 9, 2012, the Tampa Bay Lightning assigned Brown, as well as 17 other players, to the Syracuse Crunch of the American Hockey League (AHL), their top minor league affiliate. This was done in part due to the ongoing 2012–13 NHL lockout that cancelled the first half of the 2012–13 season until late January. On December 28, 2012, Brown sustained a shoulder injury in a 4–2 Crunch victory over the Norfolk Admirals. Prior to the injury, Brown had six goals, 17 points and four penalty minutes in 26 games for Syracuse. It was revealed later in the day that Brown had suffered a broken collarbone, which required surgery to repair. Although expected to compete for a roster spot with the Lightning once NHL play resumed, the injury was expected to sideline him for six-to-eight weeks.

On July 7, 2013, Tampa Bay announced that they had re-signed Brown to a one-year, two-way contract. At the end of the season, Brown had skated in 51 games with the Crunch, recording 10 goals and 28 points to go along with 27 penalty minutes. Additionally, he played in 18 Calder Cup playoff games with Syracuse, registering four goals and nine points to go along with 18 penalty minutes.

On September 29, 2013, Brown was reassigned to the Crunch by the Lightning as part of roster cuts for the upcoming 2013–14 season. On November 11, 2013, however, Tampa Bay recalled Brown from Syracuse. Prior to being recalled, Brown was on a two-game point streak, with a goal and an assist. It was during this time that he received the nickname "Brownov" as the third player on a successful forward line with Russians Vladislav Namestnikov and Nikita Kucherov.

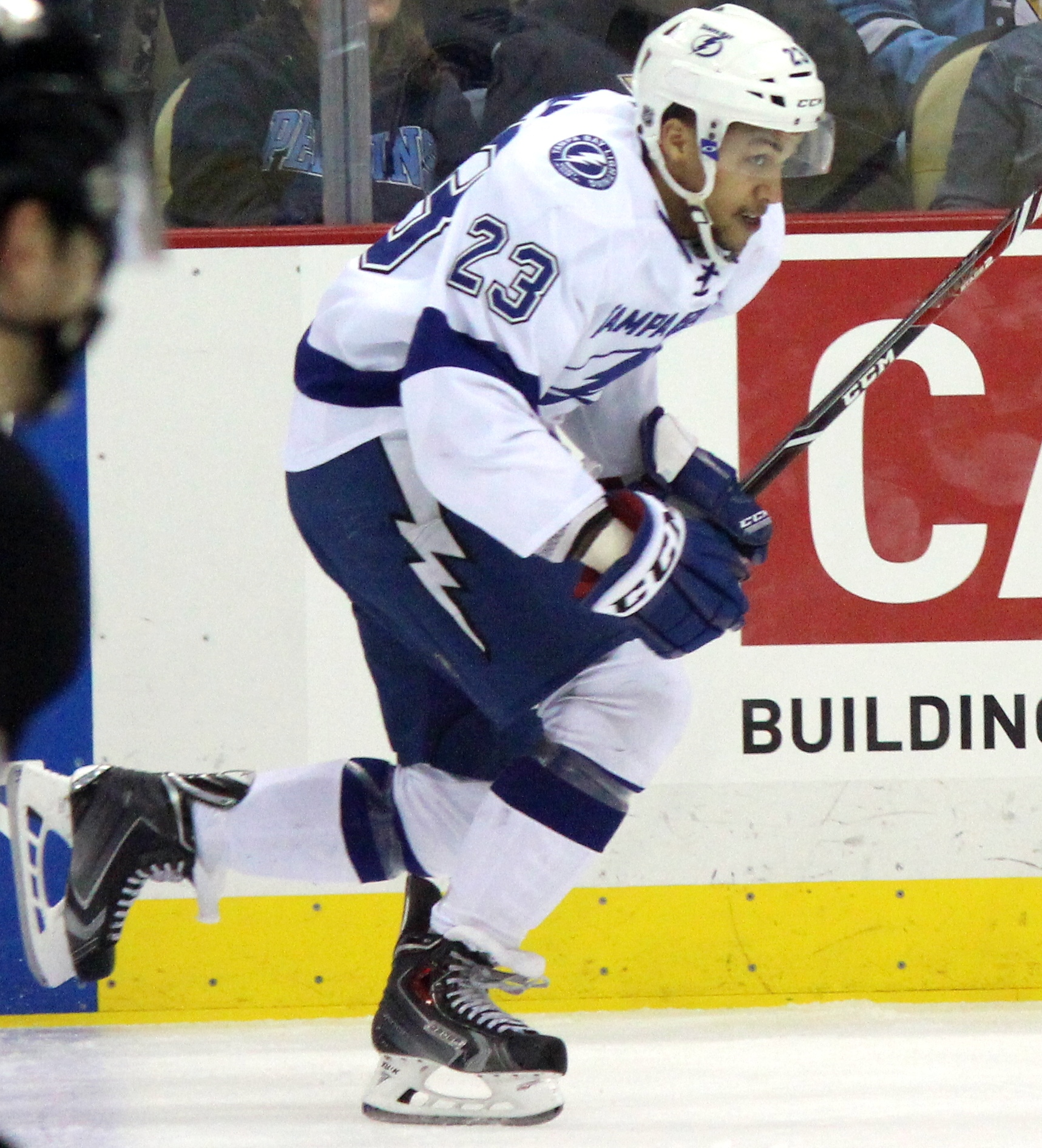
Brown with the Tampa Bay Lightning in March 2014

On November 16, 2013, Brown scored his first career NHL goal in a 6–3 loss to the Phoenix Coyotes.

On June 6, 2014, the Lightning announced the re-signing of forward Brown to a two-year, one-way contract. He appeared in 63 games with the Lightning during the 2014–15 season, posting four goals and 19 points while averaging 13:02 in ice time per game. Brown also played in all four Stanley Cup playoff games in 2014, notching two assists in Tampa Bay's four-game series defeat at the hands of the Montreal Canadiens in the Eastern Conference First Round. During the post-season, Brown was averaging 14:59 minutes in ice time.

On May 3, 2015, Brown scored his first career Stanley Cup playoff goal in a 6–2 Lightning win over the Montreal Canadiens in the Eastern Conference Second Round in the 2015 Stanley Cup playoffs.

On June 24, 2016, the Lightning announced the re-signing of Brown to two-year contract extension. Brown played in 78 regular season games during the past season, recording eight goals and 22 points. Brown was tied for third on the team with a plus-16 rating. Brown set career bests in games played, goals, points, plus/minus and penalty minutes last season. He also appeared in nine Stanley Cup Playoff games, recording two assists and two penalty minutes. Brown has skated in 198 career NHL games, all with the Lightning over four seasons, registering 15 goals and 51 points. He also has skated in 37 playoff games, recording a goal and six points.

On October 15, 2016, Brown skated in his 200th career NHL game, which came during a 3–2 Lightning win over the visiting New Jersey Devils.

==== Anaheim Ducks ====
In his sixth season with the Lightning in the 2017–18 season, Brown was used in a reduced role. On January 13, 2018, Brown was placed on waivers by the Lightning after appearing in 24 games, and was then claimed by the Anaheim Ducks on January 14. Brown played out the season with the Ducks, contributing with 1 goal and 3 points in 23 games in a fourth-line role.

==== Minnesota Wild ====
As a free agent from the Ducks in the off-season, Brown opted to return to his home state, securing a two-year $1.375 million contract with the Minnesota Wild on July 1, 2018.

==== IF Björklöven ====
When the 2020–21 NHL season began on January 13, 2021, Brown was without a contract. One week later, on January 20, 2021, he signed a one-year contract with IF Björklöven of the HockeyAllsvenskan league.

== International play ==
Brown played with the U.S. national team at the 2012 IIHF World Championship. He scored his first goal against Kazakhstan on May 11, 2012.

== Activism ==
On September 28, 2017, before a preseason season game versus the Florida Panthers, Brown raised his fist during the U.S. national anthem, in an attempt to "bring awareness to police brutality and inequality for minorities." He did the same on an October 7 game also against the Panthers, becoming the first NHL player to protest during the anthem in a regular season game. He stated that he had "received death threats" after the protest. In the week following, he and a few teammates met with members of the Tampa Police Department after receiving an invitation from the interim police chief. On October 18, Brown announced that he would no longer raise a fist during the anthem, but would continue to work to bring awareness around issues of police brutality and other racial inequalities and injustices.

In July 2018, Brown founded a charity marathon Fortnite event to raise funds for Hockey Is For Everyone.

== Post-playing career ==
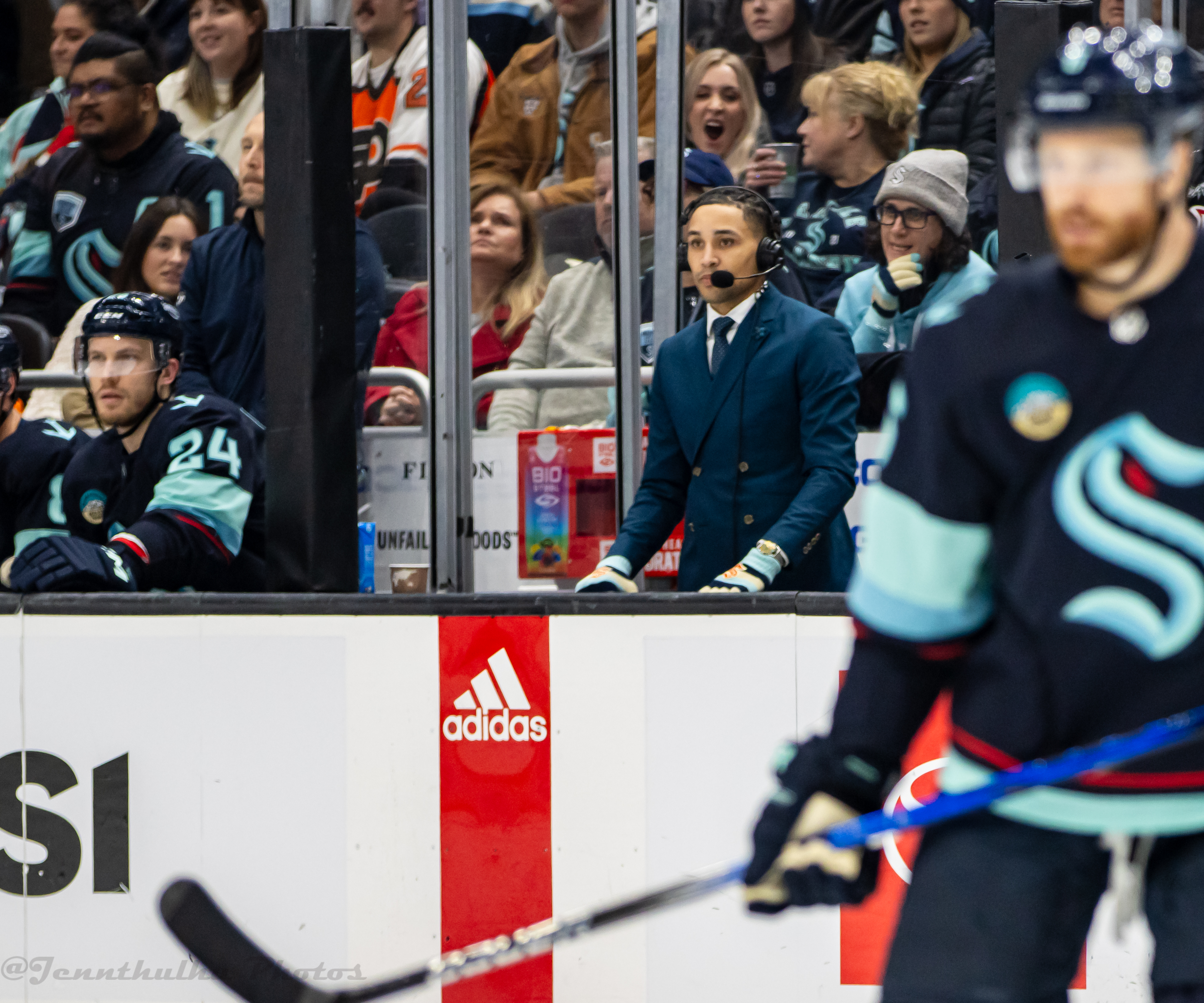
Brown in between the benches as a commentator in 2023.

On June 21, 2021, Brown joined Root Sports Northwest as a color commentator for the Seattle Kraken. On February 17, 2022, Brown and Everett Fitzhugh called the Kraken's game against the Winnipeg Jets. The pairing was the first all-Black TV broadcast in NHL history.

== Personal life ==
Brown was born in Burnsville, Minnesota and was raised in Rosemount, Minnesota. Brown is the son of former National Football League (NFL) running back Ted Brown, who played eight NFL seasons (1979–1986) for the Minnesota Vikings. In an interview, Brown gave credit to his father for having played a vital role in being able to push his game to new heights. Speaking about his father, "he has always been someone to lean on. He and the rest of my family always have always really supported me. I can't thank them enough."

On February 6, 2015, Brown married Lexi LaFleur. The couple have two children.

== Career statistics ==
=== Regular season and playoffs ===
			Regular season					Playoffs
Season	Team	League	GP	G	A	Pts	PIM	GP	G	A	Pts	PIM
2005–06	Rosemount High School	HS-MN	—	19	7	26	—	—	—	—	—	—
2006–07	Rosemount High School	HS-MN	27	24	23	47	—	—	—	—	—	—
2007–08	Rosemount High School	HS-MN	24	32	35	67	26	—	—	—	—	—
2008–09	Waterloo Black Hawks	USHL	36	14	22	36	28	3	1	0	1	4
2009–10	Waterloo Black Hawks	USHL	60	34	43	77	64	3	1	0	1	0
2010–11	University of Minnesota Duluth	WCHA	42	16	21	37	50	—	—	—	—	—
2011–12	University of Minnesota Duluth	WCHA	39	24	23	47	59	—	—	—	—	—
2011–12	Tampa Bay Lightning	NHL	5	0	1	1	0	—	—	—	—	—
2012–13	Syracuse Crunch	AHL	51	10	18	28	27	18	4	5	9	18
2013–14	Syracuse Crunch	AHL	13	4	6	10	24	—	—	—	—	—
2013–14	Tampa Bay Lightning	NHL	63	4	15	19	6	4	0	2	2	0
2014–15	Tampa Bay Lightning	NHL	52	3	6	9	30	24	1	1	2	0
2015–16	Tampa Bay Lightning	NHL	78	8	14	22	59	9	0	2	2	2
2016–17	Tampa Bay Lightning	NHL	64	3	3	6	73	—	—	—	—	—
2017–18	Tampa Bay Lightning	NHL	24	1	3	4	12	—	—	—	—	—
2017–18	Anaheim Ducks	NHL	23	1	2	3	12	4	0	0	0	0
2018–19	Minnesota Wild	NHL	56	3	5	8	29	—	—	—	—	—
2018–19	Iowa Wild	AHL	6	3	3	6	4	—	—	—	—	—
2019–20	Iowa Wild	AHL	62	9	13	22	55	—	—	—	—	—
2020–21	IF Björklöven	SWE.2	19	6	6	12	8	14	3	5	8	6
NHL totals			365	23	49	72	221	41	1	5	6	2

=== International ===
Year	Team	Event	Result	GP	G	A	Pts	PIM
2012	United States	WC	7th	6	1	1	2	0
Senior totals				6	1	1	2	0

== Awards and honors ==
Award	Year	Ref
College
WCHA All-Rookie Team	2010–11	
NCAA All-Tournament Team	2011	
All-WCHA First Team	2011–12	
AHCA West Second-Team All-American	2011–12	

== See also ==
- Black players in ice hockey

Awards and achievements
Preceded by Ben Smith	NCAA Tournament Most Outstanding Player; 2011	Succeeded by Parker Milner
