= KSUP =

Juneau, Alaska; United States
- Frequency: 106.3 MHz (HD Radio)
- Branding: Mix 106

Programming
- Format: Hot adult contemporary
- Subchannels: HD2: Hawk 107.9 (Sports)

Ownership
- Owner: Cliff Dumas; (BTC USA Holdings Management Inc.)
- Sister stations: KINY, KXXJ

History
- First air date: December 1, 1984

Technical information
- Licensing authority: FCC
- Facility ID: 820
- Class: C3
- ERP: 10,000 watts
- HAAT: -307 meters
- Translator: HD2: 107.9 K300AB (Juneau)

Links
- Public license information: Public file; LMS
- Webcast: Listen Live
- Website: mixfmalaska.com

KSUP (106.3 FM) is a commercial music radio station in Juneau, Alaska. The station changed from a rock format in the spring of 2007. The station is branded as "Mix 106".

In June 2008, MIX 106 and its sister station, KINY, were bought by Alaska Broadcast Communications.

Effective April 28, 2023, KSUP, sister stations KINY and KXXJ, and eight translators were sold to Cliff Dumas' BTC USA Holdings Management Inc. for $420,000.

== KSUP-HD2 ==
On March 10, 2021, KSUP launched a sports format on its HD2 subchannel, branded as "Hawk 107.9" (simulcast on FM translator K300AB 107.9 FM Juneau), with programming from Fox Sports Radio.

== Previous logo ==
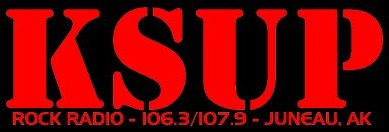
KSUP logo under previous rock format
