= List of San Jose Sharks broadcasters =

This is a list of broadcasters for the San Jose Sharks ice hockey team.

== Current ==
Television

- Randy Hahn: play-by-play commentator
- Drew Remenda: color commentator, primary
- Natalie Noury: Sharks Pregame Live and Postgame Live, studio host
- Jason Demers: studio analyst, lead
- Mark Smith: studio analyst
- Ted Ramey: studio analyst, select games
- Nick Nollenberger: studio analyst, select games
- Tara Slone: content contributor, select games

Radio

- Dan Rusanowsky: play-by-play commentator
- Jamal Mayers: color commentator, primary
- Scott Hannan: color commentator, select games
- Jason Demers: color commentator, select games
- Ted Ramey: Sharks Audio Network host and color commentator, select games
- Tara Slone: Sharks Audio Network host

== Radio ==
KFOX was the official radio station for the San Jose Sharks of the National Hockey League until 2021, when the Sharks announced the launch of the Sharks Audio Network, a digital-only platform that would carry all Sharks games. In a 2006 column, a writer for the San Jose Mercury News noted that he could only listen to a broadcast of a Stanley Cup playoff game on KFOX since his cable company did not carry OLN (later Versus, now NBC Sports Network), which had exclusive television rights to the game. That situation, he noted, provided an ironic twist to him living in the technology-rich Silicon Valley.

From 1997 to 2000, KARA was the flagship station for the Sharks before KFOX took over in 2000.

Years	Play-by-play	Color commentators
1991–92	Dan Rusanowsky	Tom Laidlaw
1992–1997	Dan Rusanowsky	Chris Collins
1997–2000	Dan Rusanowsky	Drew Remenda
2000–04	Dan Rusanowsky	Pete Stemkowski
2005–2014	Dan Rusanowsky	Jamie Baker (primary); David Maley (when Baker is sent on assignments for the organization)
2014–2018	Dan Rusanowsky	Bret Hedican (primary); David Maley (when Hedican calls game on NBCSN or NBC Sports California)
2018–19	Dan Rusanowsky	Jamie Baker (select games); Bret Hedican (select games); Mark Smith (select games)
2019–20	Dan Rusanowsky	Jamie Baker (select games); Bret Hedican (select games); Mark Smith (select games); Scott Hannan (select games)
2021–2024	Dan Rusanowsky	Mark Smith (select games); Scott Hannan (select games); Bret Hedican (select games); Drew Remenda (select games)
2024–2026	Dan Rusanowsky	Drew Remenda (select games); Scott Hannan (select games); Jamal Mayers (select games); Jason Demers (select games); Alex Stalock (select games); Dan Boyle (select games); Ted Ramey (select games)
2026–present	Dan Rusanowsky	Jamal Mayers (primary); Scott Hannan (select games); Jason Demers (select games)

=== Notes ===
- Dennis Hull did color commentary on non-televised games through February 1992, Tom Laidlaw after; Dan Rusanowsky did televised games alone.
- Rusanowsky is responsible for producing all Sharks radio broadcasts and has worked with a variety of color commentators over his tenure with the team. Currently, his broadcast partner is rotating among Bret Hedican, Drew Remenda, Mark Smith or Scott Hannan. Rusanowsky also operates and administers the San Jose Sharks Radio Network, which began in 1991 and brings Sharks broadcasts to Northern California. Additionally, Rusanowsky is one of a select few play-by-play announcers who have called the NHL Game of the Week on Westwood One Radio Network. Until 2000, Rusanowsky had been the only broadcaster who had called all San Jose Sharks regular season and playoff games in franchise history. This came to an end when he was injured in a serious automobile accident on November 25, 2000, ending a continuous broadcast streak of Sharks games at 774. Due to the accident, he had missed 27 games. Rusanowsky called his historic 1,000th Sharks regular season game on March 21, 2004, vs. Edmonton. On January 29, 2009, he was on the air with his 1,300th Sharks regular season game vs. Phoenix. Dan called his 2000th Sharks regular season game on January 16, 2018, vs. Phoenix.
  - As previously mentioned, Rusanowsky has done all Sharks games except for about 27 games from November 25, 2000, through January 13, 2001. He was badly injured in an auto accident on his way to the arena that afternoon, and was unable to return until January 15, 2001. His replacements were Roxy Bernstein, Jim Blaney, Randy Hahn, Pat Olson, Ted Robinson, and Bob Stouffer.
- From 1992–93 through 1996–97, Chris Collins did color commentary on home games only.
- From 1997–98 through 1999–2000, Drew Remenda did radio color commentary on all games.
- In 2005–06 season, Baker returned to the San Jose Sharks, joining Dan Rusanowsky and David Maley on the Sharks' radio broadcast team. He called most games with Rusanowsky, although he would occasionally be replaced by Maley when sent on assignments for the organization. On occasions, Baker and Maley joined Rusanowsky in a popular "triple-cast" format. Beginning with the 2008–09 season, Baker also hosts pre-game and post-game shows for Sharks games on NBC Sports Bay Area. He became Randy Hahn's color commentator on the Sharks' NBC Sports California broadcasts in 2014 after Drew Remenda's departure to a same role for the Edmonton Oilers. Since the 2018–19 season, he and Bret Hedican joined Randy Hahn in a popular "triple-cast" format.
- On June 1, 2023, Rusanowsky was announced as the recipient of the 2023 Foster Hewitt Memorial Award, voted on by the NHL Broadcaster’s Association and presented "in recognition of members of the radio and television industry who made outstanding contributions to their profession and the game during their career in hockey broadcasting." He then accepted an offer on November 12, 2023.

== Television ==
NBC Sports Bay Area was the home of the NHL's San Jose Sharks until the end of the 2008–09 NHL season, when their games also moved to NBC Sports California. They host Sharks Pregame Live and Postgame Live as well as intermission coverage. Over-the-air telecasts aired on KGO 7 from 1991–1994 and on KICU 36 from 1995–1999.

Years	Play-by-play	Color commentator(s)	Studio Host	Studio Analyst
1991–93	Joe Starkey (primary); Randy Hahn (select games)	Pete Stemkowski (select games); Dennis Hull (select games); Brian Hayward (select games)		
1993–96	Randy Hahn	Pete Stemkowski		
1996–97	Randy Hahn	Chris Collins		
1997–2000	Randy Hahn	Steve Konroyd		
2000–06, 2007–2011	Randy Hahn	Drew Remenda		
2006–07	Randy Hahn	Marty McSorley		
2009			Brodie Brazil	
2011–14	Randy Hahn	Drew Remenda; Bret Hedican (select home games)	Brodie Brazil	
2014–2018	Randy Hahn	Jamie Baker (primary); Bret Hedican (during Baker's absences)	Brodie Brazil	
2018–19	Randy Hahn	Jamie Baker (select games); Bret Hedican (select games)	Brodie Brazil	
2019–20	Randy Hahn	Jamie Baker (select games); Bret Hedican (select games); Kendall Coyne Schofield (select games)	Brodie Brazil	
2021–2024	Randy Hahn	Bret Hedican (most games); Scott Hannan (select games); Drew Remenda (select games)	Brodie Brazil	
2024–2026	Randy Hahn	Drew Remenda (primary); Scott Hannan (select games); Jamal Mayers (select games); Jason Demers (select games); Alex Stalock (select games)	Alan Hoshida	
2026–present	Randy Hahn	Drew Remenda (primary)	Natalie Noury	Jason Demers (lead); Mark Smith; Ted Ramy; Nick Nollenberg

=== Notes ===
- After his coaching career, Remenda was offered a job as a broadcast analyst for the Sharks. Remenda started on radio, calling games with long-time Sharks radio announcer Dan Rusanowsky. In 1999, Remenda moved up to the Sharks TV crew, joining announcer Randy Hahn in calling Sharks games. His broadcast work with the Sharks over the years earned Remenda three Northern California Emmy Awards in the "On Camera Sports" category in 1999, 2001 and 2006. Remenda also hosted Shark Byte, a 30-minute magazine-style show on CSN Bay Area dedicated to a behind the scenes look at the Sharks. On May 17, 2006, following the Sharks' ouster from the 2006 Stanley Cup Playoffs by the Edmonton Oilers, Remenda and Hahn tearfully wrapped up the telecast by announcing that Remenda would not return to the Sharks broadcast team in 2006–07. Remenda teamed up with Hahn on FSN Bay Area (now CSN Bay Area) again during Games 3 and 6 of the Sharks Western Conference semifinal matchup with the Detroit Red Wings when Marty McSorley was unavailable for what the Sharks called "personal reasons." The San Jose Mercury News reported on July 3, 2007, that the Sharks had made an offer to Remenda in an effort to lure him back to the team's broadcast booth for the 2007–08 season. A month later, the San Jose Sharks reported on their web site that Remenda had agreed to return to the organization as the team's television color analyst, replacing the departed McSorley. On June 17, 2014, it was reported that Remenda would not have his contract renewed as their color commentator. In February 2021, Remenda returned to Sharks broadcasting, initially joining for select pre-game and post-game segments, before returning to his role as primary color commentator in September 2021.
- In February 2009, Brodie Brazil, then a rink-side commentator with CSN-CA, moved to the studio to be the in-game host for pregame, intermission, and postgame coverage. He was the original and primary anchor for the Sharks Pregame Live and Postgame Live program.
- On November 14, 2016 it was announced that NBC Sports California (then CSN-CA: Comcast Sports Network California) would start to live stream Sharks Pregame and Postgame Live.
- On September 5, 2024 it was announced that Alan Hoshida would be taking over as the studio host for Sharks Pregame and Postgame Live, with Brodie Brazil being asked to step-down after 15 years.
- On September 14, 2026 it was announced that Jason Demers, former Sharks defenseman and previous color commentator for select games, would be the lead studio analyst for Sharks Pregame and Postgame Live.
- On August 29, 2026 at a San Francisco Giants game, it was revealed on the live broadcast that Natalie Noury, who was in attendance with Macklin Celebrini and Will Smith for a promotional event, would be the new Sharks pre-game host. The official announcement came with a press release on September 15, 2026 stating that Natalie would be taking over as the studio host for Sharks Pregame and Postgame Live on NBC Sports California. She is the first woman to be a television broadcaster for the San Jose Sharks.

== See also ==
- Historical NHL over-the-air television broadcasters
- California Golden Seals#Broadcasters - The San Francisco Bay Area's first National Hockey League franchise that existed from 1967–1975–1976.
