= List of Edmonton Oilers broadcasters =

Television rights to all Edmonton Oilers games are held by Rogers Media. This includes all regional telecasts, which are carried by Sportsnet West and the overflow channel Sportsnet Oilers, as well as nationally televised games on Sportsnet or Hockey Night in Canada—which may either be broadcast by CBC Television, Citytv, or Sportsnet. The team's broadcast region is shared with the Calgary Flames, and includes all of Alberta, Saskatchewan, Northwest Territories and Nunavut. Most Oilers games are commentated by Jack Michaels and Louie DeBrusk, joined by reporter Gene Principe.

== Television ==
The TV crews were as follows (where more than one analyst appears for a season, each worked a number of games).

| Years | Play-by-play | Colour commentators |
|---|---|---|
| 1979–81 | Tim Dancy | Gerry Pinder (select games); Gary Dornhoefer (select games) |
| 1981–84 | Tim Dancy | Gary Dornhoefer (select games); Mickey Redmond (select games); Don Cherry (select games) |
| 1984–86 | Bruce Buchanan | Garry Unger (select games); John Davidson (select games); Gary Dornhoefer (select games) |
| 1986–90 | Bruce Buchanan | John Garrett (select games); Harry Neale (select games); Scotty Bowman (select games) |
| 1990–92 | Bruce Buchanan | John Garrett (select games); Harry Neale (select games); Jim Peplinski (select games); Steve Shutt (select games) |
| 1992–95 | Al Nagy | John Garrett (select games); Harry Neale (select games); Jim Peplinski (select games); Greg Millen (select games) |
| 1995–97 | Roger Millions | John Garrett (select games); Harry Neale (select games); Jim Peplinski (select games); Greg Millen (select games) |
| 1997–98 | Bruce Buchanan | John Garrett (select games); Harry Neale (select games in 1997–98); Jim Peplinski (select games); Greg Millen (select games) |
| 1998–2001 | Bruce Buchanan | John Garrett (select games); Craig Simpson (select games) |
| 2001–2003 | Kevin Quinn | Craig Simpson |
| 2003–08 | Kevin Quinn | Ray Ferraro |
| 2008–2014 | Kevin Quinn | Louie DeBrusk |
| 2014–18 | Kevin Quinn | Drew Remenda |
| 2018–20 | Kevin Quinn | Louie DeBrusk (primary); Drew Remenda (select games) |
| 2021–present | Jack Michaels | Louie DeBrusk |

== Pay-per-view television ==
The pay-per-view TV crews were as follows (where more than one analyst appears for a season, each worked a number of games).

| Years | Play-by-play | Colour commentators |
|---|---|---|
| 2005–2008 (PPV) | Morley Scott | Ray Ferraro |
| 2008–09 (PPV) | Morley Scott | Louie DeBrusk (select games); Rob Brown (select games) |

=== Notes ===
- Bruce Buchanan was the play-by-play announcer for the Edmonton Oilers television broadcasts on ITV, CKEM, and Sportsnet West from 1984 until 2001.
- Morley Scott did colour on home games in 1993-94 and 1997–08; others in that role were Ken Brown (1979–85, 1988–90), Gord Garbutt (1985-86, 1991–94, 1995-96), Jim Matheson (1986–88, 1995–96) and Dave Semenko (1994–95). Bob Stouffer did colour commentary beginning in 2008–09. Kevin Karius substituted for Scott when Scott doing games broadcast on pay-per-view beginning in 2005. Colour commentators did not go on the road until at least 1995-96.
- On September 2, 2008, Louie DeBrusk was announced as the new colour commentator for Rogers Sportsnet Edmonton Oilers television broadcasts, replacing former colour commentator Ray Ferraro. He was replaced by Drew Remenda in 2014 but continues to appear as an analyst. He later replaced Remenda on most broadcasts in 2018 and full-time in 2021.

== See also ==
- Historical NHL over-the-air television broadcasters
