= Jamie Baker (ice hockey) =

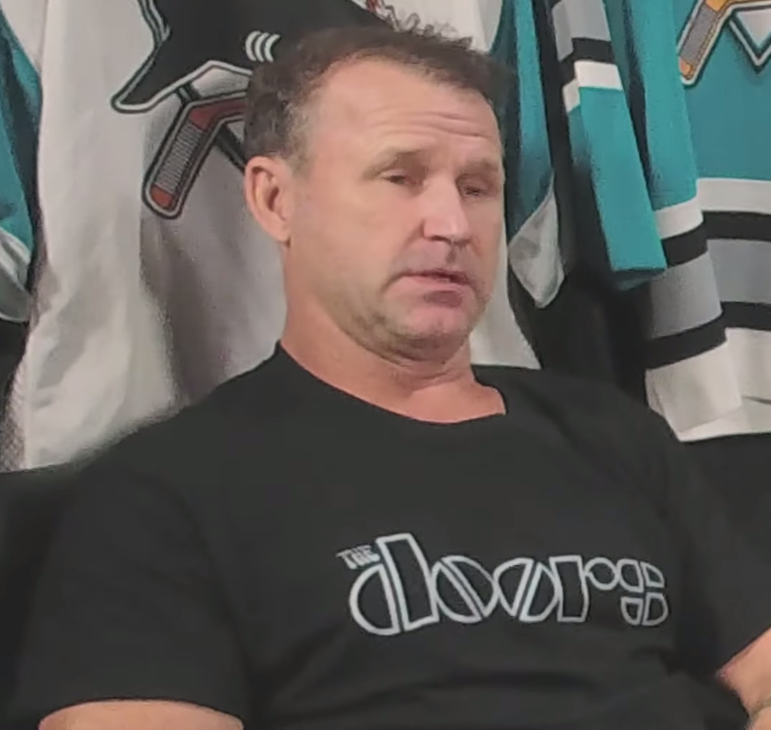
- Baker in 2019
- Born: August 31, 1966 (age 60) Nepean, Ontario, Canada
- Height: 6 ft 1 in (185 cm)
- Weight: 190 lb (86 kg; 13 st 8 lb)
- Position: Centre
- Shot: Left
- Played for: Quebec Nordiques; Ottawa Senators; San Jose Sharks; Toronto Maple Leafs
- NHL draft: 1988 NHL Supplemental Draft; Quebec Nordiques
- Playing career: 1989–1999

James Paul Baker (born August 31, 1966) is a Canadian former ice hockey player, having played for the Quebec Nordiques, Ottawa Senators, San Jose Sharks, and Toronto Maple Leafs. He was a former radio personality for the San Jose Sharks and was their television colour commentator from 2014 to 2020.

== Early life ==
Baker was born in Nepean, Ontario and grew up in the town. He played minor hockey with the Nepean Raiders.

== Playing career ==
=== Amateur ===
Baker joined the St. Lawrence Saints of the Eastern College Athletic Conference (ECAC) for the 1985–86 season to play college hockey. In his rookie season, he recorded nine goals and 16 assists for 25 points in 31 games. St. Lawrence won the in-season tournament for the Empire Cup played in November. He returned to St. Lawrence for his sophomore season in 1986–87, making 32 appearances, marking eight goals and 32 points.

In his junior season in 1987–88, he recorded 26 goals and 54 points in 38 games, while playing on the team's second line alongside Joe Day and Gary Robertson. The Saints advanced to the ECAC tournament final and beat the Clarkson Golden Knights to win their first ECAC championship since 1963. As the tournament's champion, St. Lawrence was invited to the 1988 NCAA Division I men's ice hockey tournament and got a bye to the second round. The team advanced to the final four and after knocking off the top-ranked Minnesota Gophers, they faced the Lake Superior Lakers in the final. The Saints lost 3–2 in overtime and finished second in the tournament. Baker returned for this senior season in 1988–89, and centered the first line between Day and Robertson. He was named the team's captain. The team got off to a great start and Baker led the team in scoring, however, he suffered a fracture in his fibula and ligament damage to his left ankle in late December. He only got into 13 games, scoring 11 goals and 27 points, before suffering the season-ending injury.

=== Professional ===
==== Quebec Nordiques ====
Baker was selected by the Quebec Nordiques of the National Hockey League (NHL) in the second round of the 1988 NHL Supplemental Draft. He was assigned to Quebec's American Hockey League (AHL) affiliate, the Halifax Citadels, to start the 1989–90 season and scored his first professional goal in the 5–2 victory over the Moncton Hawks on October 6, 1989. He appeared in 74 games, scoring 17 goals and 60 points. He was recalled by Quebec and made his NHL debut on February 2, 1990 in a 5–1 loss to the Hartford Whalers. He was sent back to Halifax on February 4 and spent the rest of the season in the AHL. The Citadels qualified for the 1990 Calder Cup playoffs but lost in the first round to the Sherbrooke Canadiens. In six playoff games, Baker went scoreless.

He was assigned to Halifax to start the 1990–91 season despite having a good training camp. He was recalled on November 20 by the Nordiques and made his NHL season debut the next day on November 21 in a 4–4 tie with the Whalers. He played on a line with fellow rookies Stéphane Morin and Ken Quinney, which while talented, was seen as overmatched against other NHLers. On November 25, he recorded his first NHL goal, the game-tying goal, against goaltender Kelly Hrudey in a 4–4 tie with the Los Angeles Kings. He appeared in 18 games, scoring two goals. On January 2, 1991, he was sent back to Halifax and finished the season in the AHL. In 50 games with Halifax, he scored 14 goals and 36 points. He once again could not crack the opening night roster of the Nordiques and was assigned to Halifax to start the 1991–92 season. However, his stay in Halifax was briefer than previous seasons as he was recalled on November 21 and made his NHL season debut that night in a 5–2 victory over the Montreal Canadiens. In nine games with the Citadels, he scored five goals. He remained with the Nordiques for the remainder of the season, playing on a line with Greg Paslawski and Marc Fortier for parts of it. In January 1992, he suffered a sprained ankle and missed two games. In 52 games with Quebec, Baker recorded seven goals and 17 points.

==== Ottawa Senators ====
Baker was without a contract entering the 1992 offseason. Meanwhile the NHL expanded by two teams, the Ottawa Senators and Tampa Bay Lightning. The expansion Senators signed him to a contract on September 2, 1992. He made his debut with the team in the Senators' season opener on October 8, recording his first point for the team on Ken Hammond's second period goal in a 5–3 victory over the Canadiens. He notched his first goal for the team on October 22, scoring the team's only marker in a 5–1 loss to the Whalers. By November, Baker was on a line with Sylvain Turgeon and Jody Hull, which was the only line capable of consistently creating offensive opportunities for the expansion Senators. Near the end of the season, it was revealed that the Senators had attempted to renegotiate Baker's contract midseason to make it more team friendly, but could not force him to accept the new terms. Baker refused to renegotiate, as he was Ottawa's second leading scorer and any attempt to send him to the minors would result in his loss on waivers. Two of his teammates, Darcy Loewen and Andrew McBain, did not have his negotiating power and were forced to accept. Baker finished as the team's third leading goal scorer and second in points with 19 and 48 respectively, in 76 games. In the 1993 offseason, Baker was among those protected by the Senators ahead of the 1993 NHL expansion draft as the league expanded by two teams, the Anaheim Mighty Ducks and Florida Panthers. In July, Baker was given a termination contract by the Senators in which they had until the end of the month to sign with another team or return to Ottawa for the 1993–94 season.

==== San Jose Sharks ====
Baker accepted an offer from the San Jose Sharks. He started the season on a line alongside Bob Errey and Rob Gaudreau and made his team debut in the season opening loss to the Edmonton Oilers on October 6, 1993. He tallied his first goal with the Sharks on October 16, scoring the team's only marker in a 1–1 tie with the Boston Bruins. In late October he went down with a stomach and groin injury that kept him out of the lineup for ten games. By December he was on a line with Jeff Odgers and Errey. In March 1994 he was centreing a line between Pat Falloon and Ray Whitney. In 65 games with the Sharks he scored 12 goals and 17 points. The Sharks made the playoffs for the first time in franchise history. Baker made his NHL playoff debut in game one of the Sharks' opening round series against the top-seeded Detroit Red Wings, collecting his first playoff goal in the 5–4 victory on April 18. He scored the series-clinching goal in the Sharks game seven 3–2 victory on April 30 to upset the Red Wings and move on to the second round. However, the Sharks run was ended by the Maple Leafs. In 14 playoff games, Baker added three goals and five points.

Baker re-signed with the Sharks in August. The following 1994–95 season was abbreviated on account of lockout, with play resuming in January 1995. Baker started the season on the fourth line with Odgers and Gaétan Duchesne. In February, he was placed on a line with Whitney and rookie Shean Donovan. By March, his line was with Duchesne and Odgers. In 43 games, he recorded seven goals and 11 points. The Sharks qualified for the playoffs for the second consecutive year and after getting by the Calgary Flames in the first round, were eliminated by the Red Wings in the second. In 11 playoff games, he scored twice and four points. In his third season with the Sharks in 1995–96, Baker was among the veterans expected to provide experience to the younger players joining the roster. However, Baker ended up skating with Falloon and Andrei Nazarov to start the season as injuries and personnel disputes disrupted the lineup. By November, he was back on a line with Whitney and Donovan. He missed time in December with an injured shoulder, and later, a concussion. In January 1996, he was back with Odgers, but now with Chris Tancill on his line. The line, nicknamed the "Dirt Bag Ling", was supposed to be a checking line, but instead put up 32 points in ten games after being created. On February 5, he recorded a three-point game, scoring twice and assisting on another by Tancill in a 6–5 victory over the Maple Leafs. It what became a disastrous year for the Sharks as the roster was overhauled midseason but still missed the playoffs. Despite the team's lack of success, Baker recorded 16 goals and 33 points in 77 games. As a result, he was named the team's most valuable player for the season.

==== Toronto Maple Leafs ====
Baker was traded to the Maple Leafs along with a fifth-round draft pick in the 1996 NHL entry draft for defenceman Todd Gill on June 14, 1996. He started on the team's checking line with Mike Craig and Ralph Intranuovo in his Maple Leafs' debut on October 5. He recorded his first point with the team in his next game on October 8, assisting on a goal by Craig in a 4–2 loss to the Edmonton Oilers. It took until November 5 in a 6–3 victory over the St. Louis Blues to score his first goal with the team. Todd Warriner replaced Intranuovo on Baker's line and they played well for a time but ultimately, the line was broken up. The line was reassembled in December after the team lost nine of twelve games in November. On December 6, he suffered a shoulder injury in a game against the New York Rangers that caused him to miss time. He returned on December 17 after missing five games. However, by February 1997, Baker was a healthy scratch for multiple games as the team struggled. However, on March 1, he took a slapshot to the head in a game against his former team, the Sharks, and was out injured until returning on April 3, missing 14 games. He finished the season with eight goals and 16 points in 58 games with the Maple Leafs.

After a rough season in his first campaign with Toronto, he went into training camp to battle for a spot on the roster against the likes of Mike Kennedy, Darby Hendrickson, Alyn McCauley, Steve Sullivan, and Brandon Convery. He was made available for the waiver draft at the end of September, but went unclaimed. Having lost the battle for a spot on the Maple Leafs' roster, he was assigned to the Chicago Wolves of the International Hockey League where he appeared in 53 games, scoring 11 goals and 45 points. He was recalled by Toronto on January 2, 1998, and made his NHL season debut on January 3 in a 4–2 loss to the New Jersey Devils. Operating on a line with Warriner and Fredrik Modin, Baker played primarily on the fourth unit as a stopgap until the return of McCauley from injury. After McCauley's return in February, Baker was placed on waivers and after going unclaimed, was sent back to Chicago, having made 13 appearances for Toronto, recording five assists. The Wolves made the playoffs and advanced to the final where they faced the Detroit Vipers. The Wolves beat the Vipers to win the franchise's first Turner Cup. In 22 playoff games, Baker tallied four goals and nine points.

==== Return to Sharks and Europe ====
Baker returned to the Sharks organization in the 1998 offseason on a professional tryout, competing against Jarrod Skalde, Ron Sutter, and Steve Guolla in training camp for the final two centre spots on the team. He was once again made available for the waiver draft, but went unclaimed. Baker signed a one-year deal with San Jose on October 5 and made the opening night roster. He made his only appearance for the team on October 10, assisting on a goal by Tony Granato in a 5–3 loss to the Flames. However, he lost his spot when contract holdouts Owen Nolan and Jeff Friesen re-signed with the team in mid-October. Surplus to the team requirements, he was removed from the roster on October 18. Baker then signed with HIFK Helsinki of Liiga in Finland. He made 11 appearances for the team, scoring one goal and six points. Baker played in ten NHL seasons. In 404 career games, he tallied 71 goals and 150 points. Baker also appeared in 25 Stanley Cup playoff games.

== Post playing career ==
In 2005–06 season, Baker returned to the San Jose Sharks, joining Dan Rusanowsky and David Maley on the Sharks' radio broadcast team. Beginning with the 2008–09 season, Baker formally hosted pre-game and post-game shows for Sharks games on NBC Sports Bay Area. He became Randy Hahn's color commentator on the Sharks' NBC Sports California broadcasts in 2014 after Drew Remenda's departure to a same role for the Edmonton Oilers. Beginning in the 2017–18 season, Baker took a series of leaves of absence from the booth relating to his personal health. Bret Hedican took over his role in his absence. On December 16, 2020, he announced that he was leaving the team's broadcast team.

He returned to Ottawa where he joined the Ottawa Senators radio broadcast team on TSN 1200 (CFGO) as an analyst on NHL-related topics.

== Personal life ==
Baker has been married twice and has two daughters from his first marriage. He suffers from mental health issues including being diagnosed with ADHD and depression, going public with his struggles in 2019. In 2019, he was inducted into his hometown Nepean's wall of fame.

== Career statistics ==
			Regular season					Playoffs
Season	Team	League	GP	G	A	Pts	PIM	GP	G	A	Pts	PIM
1985–86	St. Lawrence University	ECAC	31	9	16	25	52	—	—	—	—	—
1986–87	St. Lawrence University	ECAC	32	8	24	32	59	—	—	—	—	—
1987–88	St. Lawrence University	ECAC	38	26	28	54	44	—	—	—	—	—
1988–89	St. Lawrence University	ECAC	13	11	16	27	16	—	—	—	—	—
1989–90	Halifax Citadels	AHL	74	17	43	60	47	6	0	0	0	7
1989–90	Quebec Nordiques	NHL	1	0	0	0	0	—	—	—	—	—
1990–91	Halifax Citadels	AHL	50	14	22	36	85	—	—	—	—	—
1990–91	Quebec Nordiques	NHL	18	2	0	2	8	—	—	—	—	—
1991–92	Halifax Citadels	AHL	9	5	0	5	12	—	—	—	—	—
1991–92	Quebec Nordiques	NHL	52	7	10	17	32	—	—	—	—	—
1992–93	Ottawa Senators	NHL	76	19	29	48	54	—	—	—	—	—
1993–94	San Jose Sharks	NHL	65	12	5	17	38	14	3	2	5	30
1994–95	San Jose Sharks	NHL	43	7	4	11	22	11	2	2	4	12
1995–96	San Jose Sharks	NHL	77	16	17	33	79	—	—	—	—	—
1996–97	Toronto Maple Leafs	NHL	58	8	8	16	28	—	—	—	—	—
1997–98	Chicago Wolves	IHL	53	11	34	45	80	22	4	5	9	42
1997–98	Toronto Maple Leafs	NHL	13	0	5	5	10	—	—	—	—	—
1998–99	San Jose Sharks	NHL	1	0	1	1	0	—	—	—	—	—
1998–99	HIFK	SM-l	11	1	5	6	22	—	—	—	—	—
NHL totals			404	71	79	150	271	25	5	4	9	42

== Bibliography ==
- MacGregor, Roy (1993). Road Games: A Year in the Life of the NHL. Toronto: MacFarlane Walter & Ross. ISBN 0-921912-70-6.
