= Darren Brazil =

American film editor and producer

- Born: December 1, 1984 (age 41); Castro Valley, California, United States
- Awards: Emmys (3 won, 7 nominations)
- Musical career
- Occupations: Producer, editor, videographer
- Years active: 2003 – present

Darren Brazil (born December 1, 1984) is an American three-time Regional Emmy Award winning editor, producer and videographer who works in television and music video production.

== Summary ==
Darren Brazil was born December 1, 1984, in the San Francisco Bay Area suburb of Castro Valley, California. He graduated from Castro Valley High School in June 2003 and then received his bachelor's degree in Communication from Santa Clara University in June 2007. Brazil also studied at Imperial College in London, England in the fall of 2005.

== Professional life ==
Brazil was employed for five years at KICU (TV 36) in San Jose, California, where he produced work for both the A's On Deck Show and High School Sports Focus. He has worked with top athletes and sports figures such as Barry Zito, Mike Piazza, Frank Thomas, Nick Swisher, Bret Hedican, Chris Berman and Ozzie Guillén and has covered many sporting events including the MLB American League Championships and the 2006 MLB All-Star Game. In December 2007 Cox Broadcasting, KICU's parent company, cancelled both the A's On Deck Show and High School Sports Focus resulting in Brazil, along with the entire KICU sports department, being released.

In the middle of his stint at TV36, Brazil took a temporary leave of absence to study abroad in London, England and intern at HSI London, the European outlet of the Los Angeles based music video and commercial production company, HSI. There he assisted on videos for both Madonna and Robbie Williams.

In 2008, Brazil transitioned from television to pursue his interest in music videos stemming from his internship at HSI. He was an editor for Prime Zero Productions in the San Francisco Bay Area and edited music videos featuring popular rappers such as E-40 and Keak Da Sneak. In September, Brazil made his first appearance in front of the camera working as a featured extra in the music video "18 Days", the second single from the Virgin Records' band Saving Abel.

2009 marked the return to sports broadcasting for Brazil as he currently works at Comcast SportsNet Bay Area as an editor.

== Awards ==
In 2006, Brazil was awarded the Peter J. Marino Production Scholarship by the National Academy of Television Arts and Sciences, an achievement only to be succeeded the following year by winning two Northern California Area Emmys on three nominations for the popular A's On Deck Show segment, "Swisher Unscripted", and the High School Sports Focus documentary, "Mack Family: How Men Are Made." In 2008, Brazil was nominated four times and picked up his third Northern California Area Emmy in the category of "Editor."

== Family ==
Brazil is the younger brother of Brodie Brazil, a Bay Area sports reporter who was featured on the A's On Deck Show and co-hosted High School Sports Focus.

== Extracurricular ==
Brazil is also a licensed Federal Communications Commission (FCC) amateur radio operator and an avid traveler, visiting approximately two dozen countries and over thirty U.S. states. Brazil is also semi-bilingual and taught English to Spanish-speaking immigrants in San Jose, California.
