= Jack Michaels =

American ice hockey announcer (born 1974)

- Michaels in 2026
- Born: January 23, 1974 (age 52); Meadville, Pennsylvania, U.S.
- Education: Ithaca College
- Occupation: Play-by-play announcer
- Employers: Edmonton Oilers (2010–present); Sportsnet (2021–present)
- Spouse: Emily Moutsos (m. 2002)
- Children: 2

Jack Michaels (born January 23, 1974) is an American ice hockey announcer who is currently the play-by-play announcer for Edmonton Oilers broadcasts on 880 CHED and Sportsnet television. He was previously the announcer for the Colorado Gold Kings of the West Coast Hockey League (WCHL) from 1999 to 2002, and the Alaska Aces of the ECHL from 2002 to 2010.

Born in Meadville, Pennsylvania, Michaels attended Ithaca College in New York, where he did his first work in sports broadcasting. After graduating in 1995, Michaels returned to Meadville and worked as a sports announcer for WMGW-AM. In 1999, he decided to focus on hockey full-time and joined the WCHL's Colorado Gold Kings in Colorado Springs as a play-by-play announcer. After the team folded three seasons later in 2002, Michaels moved to Anchorage, Alaska, where he became the play-by-play announcer and media relations director for the WCHL's Anchorage Aces, which later joined the ECHL as the Alaska Aces. Between 2004 and 2010, Michaels also served as the play-by-play announcer for four ECHL All-Star Games. After broadcasting 919 professional hockey games, Michaels became a National Hockey League (NHL) broadcaster in 2010, relocating to the Canadian city of Edmonton to join the Edmonton Oilers as their radio play-by-play announcer. In 2021, he became the team's television play-by-play announcer on Sportsnet.

== Early life and education ==
Jack Michaels was born in Meadville, Pennsylvania on January 23, 1974. He is the son of Mary and Lloyd Michaels, who is an English professor at Allegheny College. His father Lloyd was a sports fan who read him the sports section of the newspaper at a young age, hoping it would nurture his interest in other literature. Instead, Michaels became interested in sports, though he described hockey as a "late-developing interest" growing up in Western Pennsylvania, where football was the primary sport. He credits the Pittsburgh Penguins' drafting of Mario Lemieux in the 1984 NHL entry draft for his interest in hockey and sports announcing, as it was "when the Penguins got good and I started to pay attention to the announcing." He was inspired by the fast-paced commentary of Penguins broadcaster Mike Lange, who he compared to announcer Dave Johnson in horse racing, another sport he grew up watching. Although Michaels became interested in hockey, he never learned how to skate.

Michaels graduated from Meadville Area Senior High School in 1991, and attended Ithaca College to pursue broadcasting. In his first week of school, he successfully auditioned to be a newsreader and sports announcer for the Sunday morning sportscast on WICB, the college's larger radio station. As an announcer, Michaels started with lacrosse and soccer, before getting the opportunity to call his first hockey game, which was for the Ithaca club hockey team. He also co-hosted a sports program on Ithaca College Television. In the summer of 1994, Michaels interned for HBO Sports in New York City.

== Career ==
After graduating from college in 1995, rejection from major sports networks led Michaels back to Meadville, where he became a morning news reporter and sports announcer for WMGW-AM. One of his first assignments at the station was to call an ostrich race at the Crawford County Fair; the race involved his colleague who was strapped to an ostrich, causing it to fall over as the race began. According to Michaels, he was then paid 75 dollars a game to do play-by-play commentary for the high school Meadville Bulldogs ice hockey team, along with the college football, basketball, and baseball teams at Allegheny College.

In the spring of 1999, Michaels announced the Penguins Cup final between the Meadville Bulldogs and the Central Catholic Vikings, which he has described as a turning point in his career. The afternoon game took place in the Civic Arena, which was to host the Pittsburgh Penguins in the evening. Penguins commentators Mike Lange and Matt McConnell were in the building and heard Michaels's calling the game; after the game ended in double-overtime, they approached him and encouraged him to focus on announcing hockey games full-time. Michaels subsequently sent out recordings of his hockey broadcasts to pro teams across the country, and was hired by the Colorado Gold Kings of the West Coast Hockey League (WCHL) in Colorado Springs later that year.

=== Colorado Gold Kings ===
Michaels started in Colorado Springs as the Gold Kings' director of broadcasting in August 1999, calling the team's games on KKCS (1460 AM). He was named the WCHL's Broadcaster of the Year for the 2000–01 season, and became the Gold Kings' assistant director of marketing in 2001.

The Gold Kings folded on August 1, 2002, ending Michaels's three-season tenure with the team. According to Michaels, he was desperate at the time, as job opportunities would be filled with training camp starting in a month, and believed he was "not well established enough to take a year off". His job search left him with the option to go to Greenville, South Carolina or to join the WCHL's Anchorage Aces in Anchorage, Alaska. Michaels was hesitant to join the Aces at the time, as the team was poorly managed to the point that the owners tried to sell the team on eBay. Nonetheless, of the two options, Michaels believed the Aces had more potential with its devoted fan base, and accepted the offer to work in Anchorage.

=== Alaska Aces ===
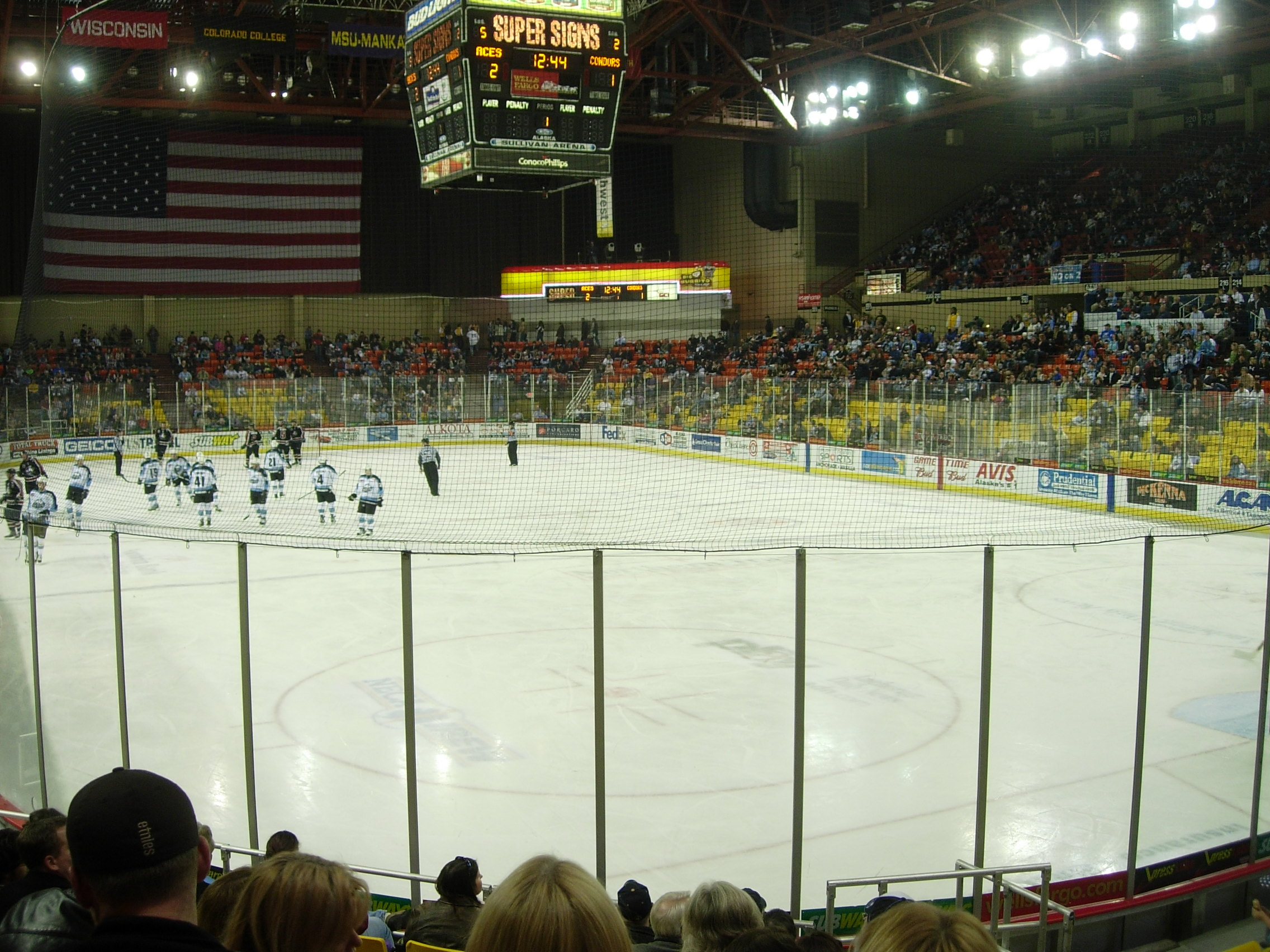
The Alaska Aces playing at Sullivan Arena in 2006.

The Anchorage Aces announced Michaels's hiring as the team's new broadcaster and director of media relations on August 25, 2002. He replaced Fred Rannard, who was the team's broadcaster since the 1996–97 season. Flying to Alaska on September 11, Michaels began calling games for the Aces a month later, on KFQD 750 AM. In addition to his duties as the Aces' play-by-play announcer, Michaels also handled the team's public relations and coordinated team travel and scheduling. He also sold sponsorships and advertisements, and managed the team's website. At the end of Michaels's first season with the Aces, he received his second WCHL Broadcaster of the Year award.

After the 2002–03 WCHL season, the league folded and the Anchorage Aces joined the ECHL as the Alaska Aces. Michaels continued his work with the Aces and announced the 2004 ECHL All-Star Game, with Neil Smith as colour commentator. He was also selected for the ECHL Broadcaster Award at the end of the 2003–04 season. For the 2006 ECHL All-Star Game broadcast, Michaels was in charge of interviewing players, coaches and other officials. During the 2006 ECHL West Division Finals in May 2006, Michaels became known for his call of the Aces' 4–3 triple-overtime win over the Las Vegas Wranglers, in a game that lasted almost five hours. His call of the game-winning goal was broadcast nationally, and subsequently voted by listeners of ESPN Radio as the "Homer Call of the Week". The Aces proceeded to win the Kelly Cup after defeating Gwinnett Gladiators in the Kelly Cup finals.

Michaels's non-broadcasting duties expanded in July 2006, when he was promoted to Vice President of Communications and Team Operations; in this capacity, he was responsible for hockey operations, as well as matters related to the ECHL. Michaels has cited the extra income from his additional responsibilities, as well as a reluctance to move his family, as reasons he rejected several broadcasting positions with teams in the American Hockey League (AHL); this was despite the AHL being a higher-tier league and thus a path to a broadcasting career in the National Hockey League (NHL). Instead, Michaels wanted a direct path to the NHL, saying in an interview that "after '06 or '07, it was NHL or bust."

In 2007, an Aces home game at Sullivan Arena was attended by the singer Steven Tyler, who joined Michaels in the third period as his colour commentator. Michaels returned as the play-by-play commentator for the ECHL All-Star Games in 2008, 2009 and 2010.

By the end of the 2009–10 ECHL season, his last with the Aces, Michaels had broadcast a total of 919 professional hockey games, 679 of which were during his eight-season tenure with the Aces. In January 2016, Michaels was inducted into the Alaska Aces Hall of Fame.

=== Edmonton Oilers ===
The Edmonton Oilers of the NHL had an open play-by-play position in the summer of 2010, which Michaels did not take seriously at the time. He had previously unsuccessfully applied for the position with the Florida Panthers and New York Islanders, and was doubtful an American would be hired by a Canadian team, based on tradition and issues with immigration. He recounts making the sudden decision to apply while driving to the airport for a family vacation, which led him to turn around and mail in a rushed application that included a DVD of his call from the 2009 Kelly Cup Final. He flew to Edmonton for an interview a month later, and was offered a position a week and a half later, while on vacation in Hawaii. Michaels later described himself as "one of the few people who can say I got my dream job in the dream location, with a week in Hawaii to celebrate". He later attributed the success of his application to a positive recommendation from a former Alaska Aces player that lived next to a member of the Oilers' hiring committee, and his inclusion of NBC national ice hockey announcer Mike Emrick on his reference list. In the press release announcing Michaels's hiring, Emrick stated he first met Michaels in 2005, and was "immediately struck by the quality of his call", adding that "there is no question [Michaels] is 100% NHL ready".

The Edmonton Oilers officially announced Michaels as their new radio play-by-play announcer on August 24, 2010. According to the Oilers, he was the only American play-by-play announcer for a Canadian team at the time. Michaels would announce all Oilers games on 630 CHED, alongside colour commentator Bob Stauffer, beginning in the 2010–11 season. Outgoing play-by-play announcer of 37 years, Rod Phillips, would return for 10 "Rod's Classics" games that season, before officially retiring on March 29, 2011. Michaels has said that he did not seek to "replace [...] or stack up to" Phillips, instead feeling free to retain and develop his own announcing style.

In December 2013, Michaels made his NHL television debut on Sportsnet as a fill-in for Oilers television announcer Kevin Quinn. His second TV appearance was for a Los Angeles Kings home broadcast in April 2017, as one of a series of fill-in announcers for Bob Miller, who had experienced health problems and was due to retire at the end of the season.

==== Move to television ====
In January 2021, the Oilers announced Michaels as the new lead play-by-play announcer for regional Oilers television broadcasts on Sportsnet, replacing Kevin Quinn. He was joined by former Oilers forward Louie DeBrusk, who replaced Drew Remenda as colour commentator. The duo began broadcasting in the 2020–21 NHL season, which had been delayed to January 2021 due to the COVID-19 pandemic. Michaels moves back to radio for nationally televised Oilers games, as well as all playoff broadcasts. Cam Moon is the radio voice for all regional broadcasts.

An annual survey of fans by The Athletic ranking regional NHL broadcasts in September 2021 reported "near-unanimous support" for Michaels after his move to television, which elevated the Oilers' ranking from 26th to 16th in the NHL. In November 2021, Michaels called two Oilers games on Hockey Night in Canada, as the program's first American announcer.

== Personal life ==
Michaels is married to Emily Michaels (née Moutsos), who graduated from Meadville Area Senior High School a year after him in 1992. In 1999, the couple moved to Colorado Springs, where they married on May 26, 2002. The Colorado Gold Kings folded three months later, leading Michaels to leave for a job in Anchorage, Alaska while Emily stayed behind to fulfill her commitment as a teacher for the local school district. Michaels ended up spending his first nine months in Anchorage away from his wife, until she moved to join him. Their daughter and son were born during their time in Anchorage.

Moving to Edmonton, Alberta in the summer of 2010, Michaels was joined by his family in September; the family initially rented out a house in neighbouring Sherwood Park.

== See also ==
- List of Edmonton Oilers broadcasters
