= Dan Rusanowsky =

American sports broadcaster (born 1960)

Daniel Rusanowsky
- Born: December 31, 1960 (age 65); Milford, Connecticut, U.S.
- Education: St. Lawrence University; Clarkson University
- Occupation: Sports commentator

Daniel Rusanowsky II (born December 31, 1960) is an American sports broadcaster, best known for being the radio play-by-play announcer for the San Jose Sharks since the team's inaugural season in 1991–92. His tenure with the team has earned him the title as the Voice of the San Jose Sharks.

== Early life and career ==
Rusanowsky was born in Milford, Connecticut. Before arriving in the Bay Area, Rusanowsky provided the radio play-by-play call for the American Hockey League's New Haven Nighthawks and was the voice of St. Lawrence University's NCAA Division I hockey program from 1979–86. He received a bachelor's degree at St. Lawrence and subsequently earned his M.B.A. at Clarkson University.

Rusanowsky is an Eagle Scout.

== San Jose Sharks ==
Rusanowsky is responsible for producing all Sharks radio broadcasts and has worked with a variety of color commentators over his tenure with the team. Currently, his broadcast partner is rotated between Drew Remenda, Bret Hedican, Mark Smith, or Scott Hannan. Rusanowsky also operates and administers the San Jose Sharks Radio Network, which began in 1991 and brings Sharks broadcasts to Northern California. Additionally, Rusanowsky is one of a select few play-by-play announcers who have called the NHL Game of the Week on Westwood One Radio Network.

Until 2000, Rusanowsky had been the only broadcaster who had called all San Jose Sharks regular season and playoff games in franchise history. This came to an end when he was injured in a serious automobile accident on November 25, 2000, ending a continuous broadcast streak of Sharks games at 774. Due to the accident, he had missed 27 games. Rusanowsky called his historic 1,000th Sharks regular season game on March 21, 2004 vs. Edmonton. On January 29, 2009, he was on the air with his 1,300th Sharks regular season game vs. Phoenix. Dan called his 2000th Sharks regular season game on January 16, 2018 vs. Arizona.

The NHL Network featured Rusanowsky on its program, "Voices," on December 25, 2008.

In addition to his broadcast duties, Rusanowsky selects the Three Stars of every Sharks home game.

== Other broadcasting duties ==
Rusanowsky stays active in the Bay Area broadcasting community year-round, and has delivered play-by-play calls of other sports. He has hosted two baseball-oriented radio segments — Dan's Dugout, which aired on Oakland Athletics radio broadcasts, and Dan's Diamond Notes for Bay Area radio station KFOX. Rusanowsky has also called games for RHI's Oakland Skates and San Jose Rhinos, the San Jose Grizzlies of the CISL, and served as a closed-circuit television broadcaster for the San Jose Grand Prix. He also appears on NBC Sports Bay Area's "Race Week" program to discuss Indy Car, Formula One, and NASCAR series. He has joined the IMS Radio Network's coverage of the GoPro Indy Grand Prix of Sonoma since 2011.

== Awards ==
In 2013, Rusanowsky was inducted into the Bay Area Radio Hall of Fame in the sports category.

In 2015, Rusanowsky received the Silver Beaver Award from the Boy Scouts of America.

In 2021, Rusanowsky received the Outstanding Eagle Scout Award from the Boy Scouts of America.

In 2023, Rusanowsky received the Foster Hewitt Memorial Award for his career in NHL broadcasting.

== Author ==
In 2018, Rusanowsky became a published author with the Triumph Books release of "If These Walls Could Talk: San Jose Sharks," which he co-wrote with reporter Ross McKeon. The book covered some behind-the-scenes stories from the team's history, and is part of Triumph's "If These Walls Could Talk" series.
