= Brodie Brazil =

American television broadcaster (born 1981)

- Born: Brodie Matthew Brazil; April 3, 1981 (age 45); Castro Valley, California, U.S.
- Education: San Jose State University
- Occupations: Sports television host and reporter
- Employer(s): NBC Sports California, NBC Sports Bay Area, 95.7 The Game
- Television: San Jose Sharks Telecasts, SportsNet Central, Sports Net Reports
- Awards: 13 regional Emmys and 32 regional Emmy nominations
- Website: www.brodiebrazil.com

Brodie Matthew Brazil (born April 3, 1981) is an American television broadcaster who has won 13 Regional Emmy Awards and been nominated for 32.

== Early life ==
Brodie Brazil was born in the San Francisco Bay Area suburb of Castro Valley, California on April 3, 1981, three years before his brother Darren Brazil. He attended Canyon Middle School and graduated from Castro Valley High School in 1999. He subsequently graduated from San Jose State University with a degree in broadcasting. Brazil was named after San Francisco 49ers quarterback John Brodie.

== Professional life ==
Brazil began his broadcasting career as an intern for the KICU-TV show High School Sports Focus during his last year of high school, after meeting J.D. Pruess, a reporter for the show, in the fall of 1998. He returned to High School Sports Focus from university in 2001 and became its co-host in 2005, remaining until the show's cancellation in late 2007.

In February 2009, Brazil joined NBC Sports Bay Area, then known as Comcast SportsNet Bay Area, where he began as a rinkside reporter during San Jose Sharks games. His later roles with the network included hosting the pre- and postgame shows for the San Jose Sharks and the Oakland Athletics, as well as hosting the programs SportsNet Reports, A's Central, and Sharks Central. On September 5, 2024, Brazil announced on YouTube that he would leave NBC on September 29, 2024.

From 2017 to 2021, Brazil hosted his own podcast Brodie Brazil Connected, featuring commentary on the San Jose Sharks and the Oakland A's during their respective seasons.

Brazil has also worked for Shark Byte, a magazine-style show about the San Jose Sharks that originated on NBC Sports Bay Area.

Brazil is a San Jose Sharks contributor for 95.7 The Game, an FM sports radio station. He has also appeared in episodes of Sharks Late Night Confidential, and has covered the San Francisco Giants and 49ers, the Golden State Warriors, Oakland Raiders, San Jose Earthquakes, the University of California, Stanford University, San Jose State University, NASCAR, and various local sports stories.

On December 18, 2024, Brazil announced on his YouTube channel that he had joined the San Jose Sharks and would begin directly covering the team in January 2025.

== Awards ==
Since 2003, Brazil has received 32 nominations and won 13 Regional Emmy Awards for his work with KTVU/KICU-TV and NBC Sports Bay Area.

== Extracurricular ==
Brazil is an FAA Instrument-rated commercial pilot. He became a flight instructor in 2008 while looking for another broadcasting job after leaving KICU-TV in 2007.
