= North High School (North St. Paul, Minnesota) =

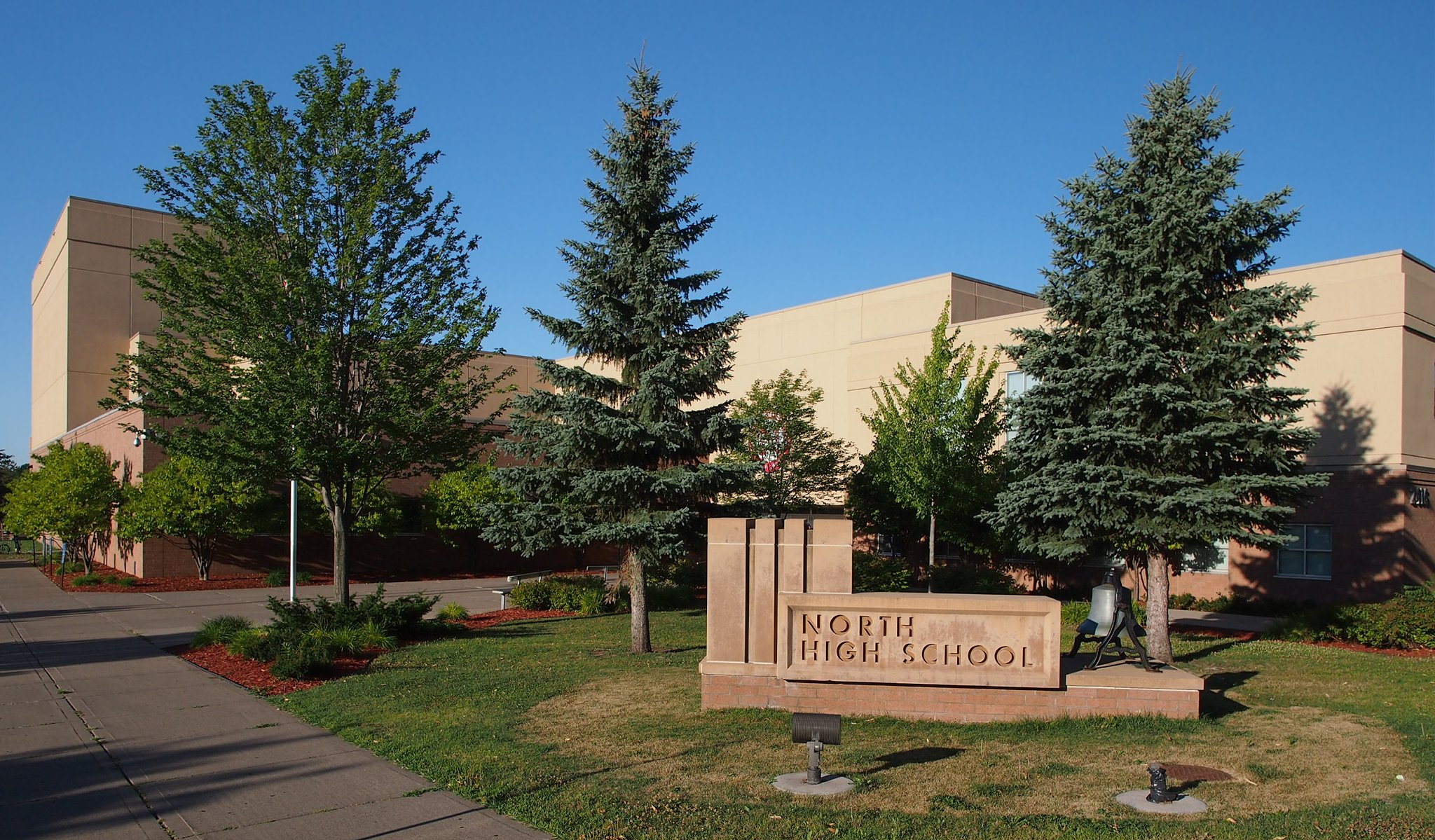
- North High School from the northeast

Location
- 2416 11th Avenue East; North Saint Paul, MN 55119; United States
- 45°0′54″N 92°59′54″W

Information
- Type: Public
- Established: 1905
- Principal: Kevin Wolff
- Teaching staff: 95.29 (FTE)
- Grades: 9–12
- Enrollment: 1,639 (2023–24)
- Student to teacher ratio: 17.20
- Hours in school day: 6.5
- Colors: Red and White
- Mascot: Polar Bear
- Website: north.isd622.org

North High School is a public 9-12 high school in North Saint Paul, Minnesota, United States. It is one of two high schools in the ISD 622 District. The other is Tartan Senior High School, in Oakdale, Minnesota.

== History ==
Founded in 1905, North High School has rebuilt five times due to growing enrollment. In 2005, it celebrated its centennial.

In 2010, Newsweek named North High one of the nation's top 1,300 schools.

== Geography ==
The school is in North St. Paul, across Minnesota State Highway 36 from downtown. Due to the setback in construction of the new building, it has a second campus in the School District 622 Education Building, at the east end of the school's parking lot.

== Curriculum ==
North offers many higher-level classes, including multiple AP courses and PSEO enrollment at multiple colleges. It also participates in the University of Minnesota's College in the Schools program.

== Extracurricular activities ==
North High offers various extracurricular activities. Athletics include volleyball, football, boys' and girls' soccer, boys' and girls' basketball, boys' and girls' cross country, boys' and girls' track, boys' and girls' swim and dive, boys' and girls' tennis, boys' and girls' golf, wrestling, baseball, boy's and girls' lacrosse, softball, boys' and girls' bowling, and boys' and girls' hockey. The boys' soccer team won the state championship in 2013. The volleyball program has also had success, making it to the section finals two years in a row.

== Incidents ==
On June 1, 2012, someone released smoke bombs on the last day of school, which resulted in the evacuation of the entire school for about 90 minutes. Five students were treated by medics but none were hospitalized.

== Notable alumni ==
- Clark Shaughnessy, College Football Hall of Fame coach
- Kip Sundgaard (1974) Olympic Ski Jumper
- Troy G. Ward (1980) Professional hockey coach: Pittsburgh Penguins, Houston Aeros, Abbotsford Heat
- Barry Bennett Former NFL defensive tackle
- Ira Dean (1987) Bass player and gold record recording artist with the band Trick Pony
- Bret Hedican (1988) Professional hockey player, husband of figure skater Kristi Yamaguchi
- Nate Richert (1996) Actor (Harvey on Sabrina the Teenage Witch), musician
- Allie Thunstrom (2006) NWHL Player for the Minnesota White Caps
- Jim O'Brien (ice hockey) (2007) Professional hockey player
- Louis Varland (2016) MLB pitcher for the Toronto Blue Jays
