= Bruce Buchanan (sportscaster) =

Canadian retired sportscaster

- Born: Brandon, Manitoba
- Occupation: broadcaster
- Employer: ITV (former)

Bruce Buchanan (born 1958 or 1959) is a Canadian retired sportscaster. He was the play-by-play announcer for the Edmonton Oilers television broadcasts on ITV, CKEM, and Sportsnet West from 1984 until 2001 with analyst John Garrett. During the 1986–87 season, he split play-by-play duties on CHCH-TV's Toronto Maple Leafs broadcasts with Calgary Flames announcer Peter Maher. He has also done play-by-play for the Red Deer Rebels, Winnipeg Jets, and Calgary Flames and got occasional play-by-play assignments on Hockey Night in Canada in the late 1980s. Buchanan later worked for Sportsnet, and as a sports anchor for A-Channel in Edmonton. As of 2005, he was working as a real estate agent.
