= Louie DeBrusk =

Canadian ice hockey player, analyst (born 1971)

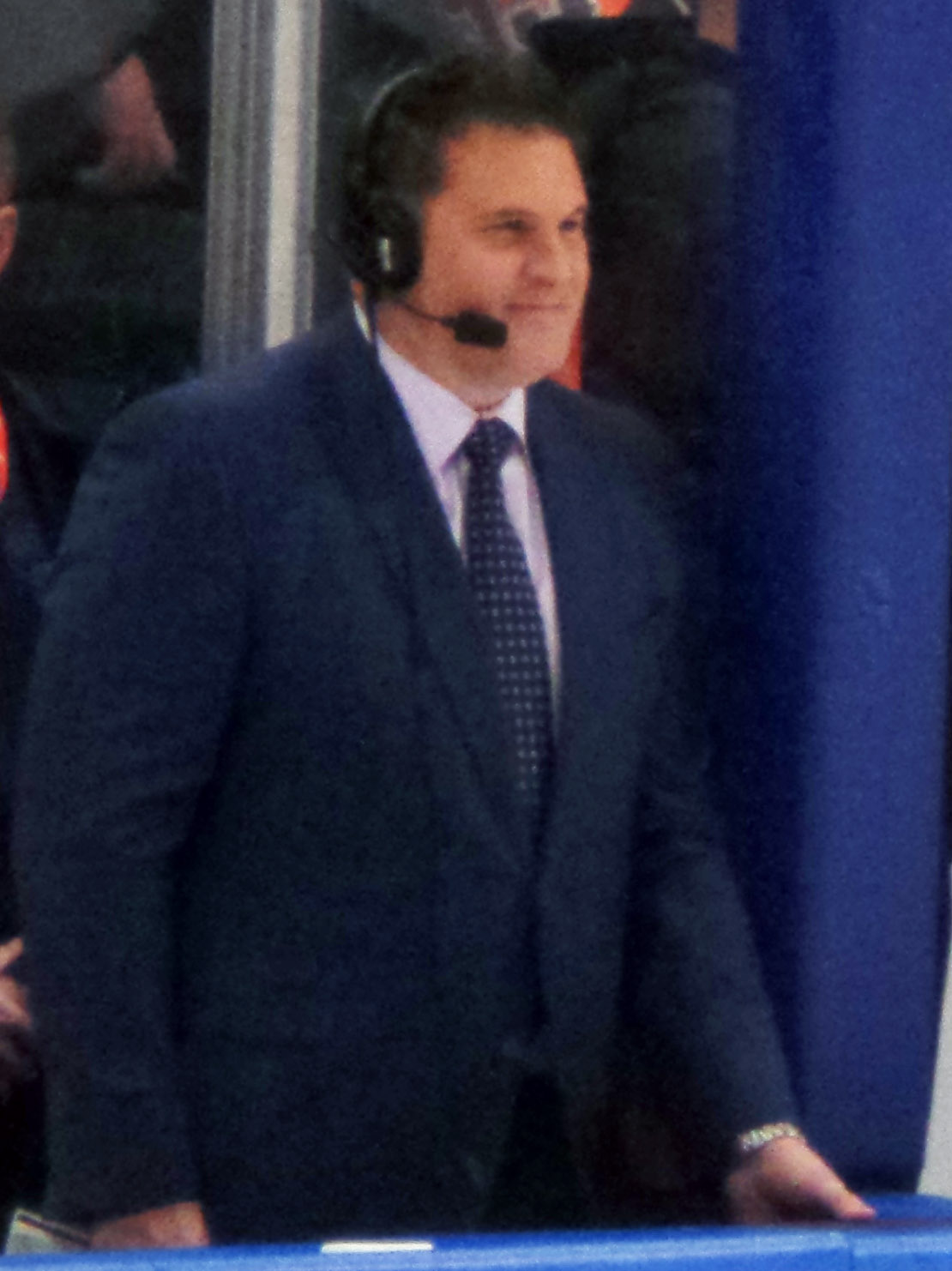
- DeBrusk in 2023
- Born: March 19, 1971 (age 55) Cambridge, Ontario, Canada
- Height: 6 ft 1 in (185 cm)
- Weight: 225 lb (102 kg; 16 st 1 lb)
- Position: Left wing
- Shot: Left
- Played for: Edmonton Oilers; Tampa Bay Lightning; Phoenix Coyotes; Chicago Blackhawks
- NHL draft: 49th overall, 1989; New York Rangers
- Playing career: 1991–2003

Louis Dennis DeBrusk (born March 19, 1971) is a Canadian sports analyst and former professional ice hockey player. He is currently a colour commentator for Edmonton Oilers broadcasts on Sportsnet and the late game of Hockey Night in Canada.

== Playing career ==
DeBrusk was raised in Port Elgin, Ontario, and played junior hockey with the Port Elgin Bears and Stratford Cullitons before joining the London Knights.

Drafted by the New York Rangers in the third round of the 1989 NHL entry draft, DeBrusk never appeared in a game for the club as he was traded to the Edmonton Oilers on October 4, 1991, in a package with Bernie Nicholls and Steven Rice for Mark Messier. DeBrusk joined the Tampa Bay Lightning as a free agent on August 27, 1997, to replace 'tough' players Rudy Poeschek and Brantt Myhres when he signed a two-year, two-way deal worth about $750,000, with the second year at the Lightning's option, before being traded to the Phoenix Coyotes on June 11, 1998, along with a fifth round pick in the 1998 for Craig Janney. Debrusk, an impending restricted free agent, was resigned by the Coyotes on August 10, 1998. On August 30, 2002, by this time again an unrestricted free agent, Debrusk signed a contract with the Chicago Blackhawks. He last appeared in a professional hockey game during the 2003–04 AHL season. Altogether, Debrusk played 401 National Hockey League games.

DeBrusk was known for his fighting skills and racked up 1,161 penalty minutes over the course of his NHL career.

He was inducted to his hometown Cambridge's Sports Hall of Fame in 2018.

== Broadcasting career ==
Debrusk is the main colour analyst on the late game of Hockey Night in Canada. He previously worked as the colour commentator for the Phoenix Coyotes radio broadcasts. On September 2, 2008, DeBrusk was announced as the new colour commentator for NHL on Sportsnet Edmonton Oilers television broadcasts, replacing former analyst Ray Ferraro. He was replaced by Drew Remenda in 2014 but continued as an analyst, before rejoining the team as a colour commentator for the 2018–19 season and full-time two years later, alongside announcer Jack Michaels.

== Personal life ==
DeBrusk's son Jake also plays in the NHL currently for the Vancouver Canucks. He was ranked the 24th-best player available in the 2015 NHL entry draft by NHL Central Scouting, and subsequently selected 14th overall that year by the Boston Bruins.

== Career statistics ==
			Regular season					Playoffs
Season	Team	League	GP	G	A	Pts	PIM	GP	G	A	Pts	PIM
1987–88	Stratford Cullitons	MWJHL	45	13	14	27	205	—	—	—	—	—
1988–89	London Knights	OHL	59	11	11	22	149	19	1	1	2	43
1989–90	London Knights	OHL	61	21	19	40	198	6	2	2	4	24
1990–91	London Knights	OHL	61	31	33	64	223	7	2	2	4	14
1990–91	Binghamton Rangers	AHL	2	0	0	0	7	2	0	0	0	9
1991–92	Cape Breton Oilers	AHL	28	2	2	4	73	—	—	—	—	—
1991–92	Edmonton Oilers	NHL	25	2	1	3	124	—	—	—	—	—
1992–93	Edmonton Oilers	NHL	51	8	2	10	205	—	—	—	—	—
1993–94	Cape Breton Oilers	AHL	5	3	1	4	73	—	—	—	—	—
1993–94	Edmonton Oilers	NHL	48	4	6	10	185	—	—	—	—	—
1994–95	Edmonton Oilers	NHL	34	2	0	2	93	—	—	—	—	—
1995–96	Edmonton Oilers	NHL	38	1	3	4	96	—	—	—	—	—
1996–97	Edmonton Oilers	NHL	32	2	0	2	94	6	0	0	0	4
1997–98	San Antonio Dragons	IHL	17	7	4	11	130	—	—	—	—	—
1997–98	Tampa Bay Lightning	NHL	54	1	2	3	166	—	—	—	—	—
1998–99	Las Vegas Thunder	IHL	26	3	6	9	160	—	—	—	—	—
1998–99	Long Beach Ice Dogs	IHL	24	5	5	10	134	—	—	—	—	—
1998–99	Springfield Falcons	AHL	3	1	0	1	0	—	—	—	—	—
1998–99	Phoenix Coyotes	NHL	15	0	0	0	34	6	2	0	2	6
1999–00	Phoenix Coyotes	NHL	61	4	3	7	78	3	0	0	0	0
2000–01	Phoenix Coyotes	NHL	39	0	0	0	79	—	—	—	—	—
2001–02	Quebec Citadelles	AHL	9	0	0	0	44	—	—	—	—	—
2001–02	Hamilton Bulldogs	AHL	20	3	5	8	42	13	1	0	1	30
2002–03	Norfolk Admirals	AHL	20	1	0	1	10	—	—	—	—	—
2002–03	Chicago Blackhawks	NHL	4	0	0	0	7	—	—	—	—	—
2003–04	Hartford Wolf Pack	AHL	12	0	0	0	12	—	—	—	—	—
AHL totals			99	10	8	18	246	15	1	0	1	39
NHL totals			401	24	17	41	1161	15	2	0	2	10
