= Jamal Mayers =

Canadian ice hockey player (born 1974)

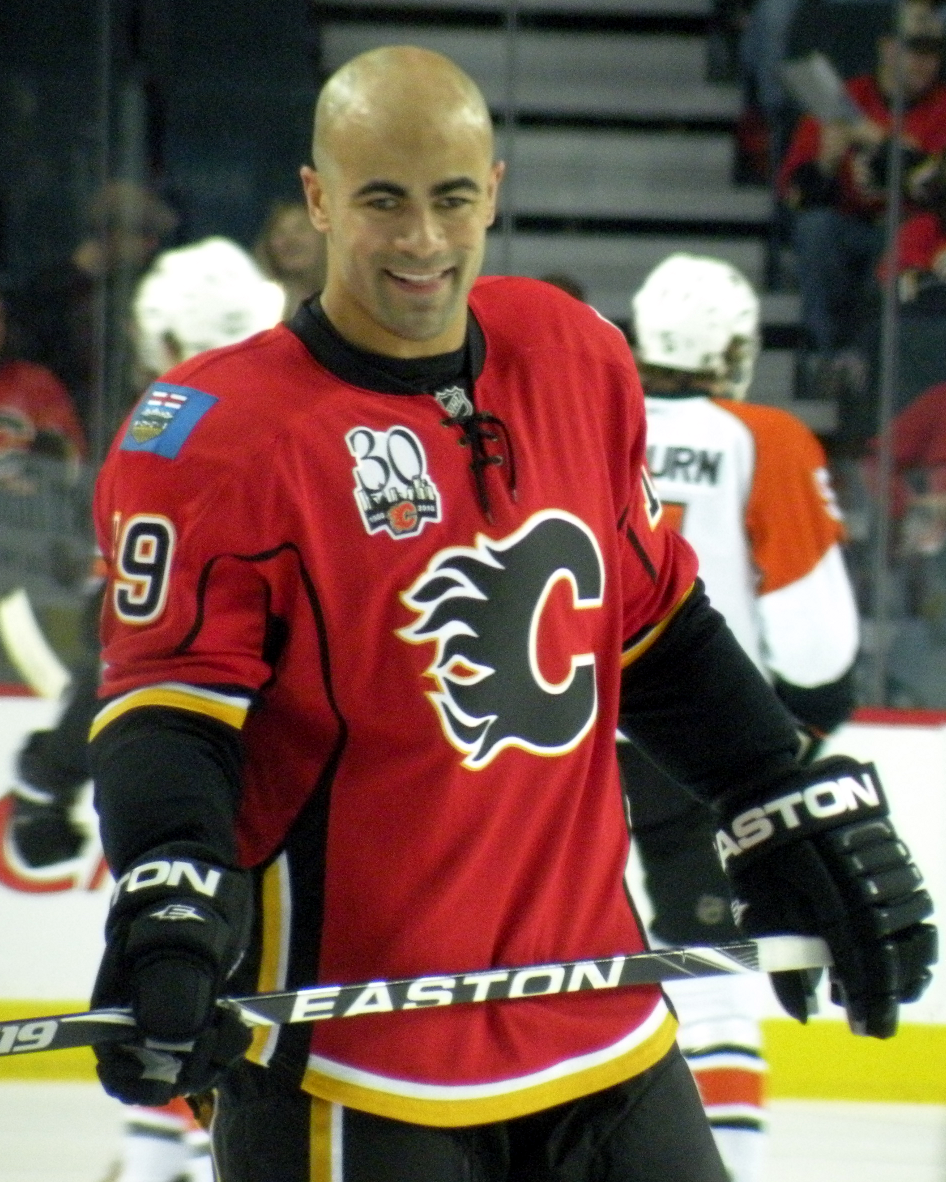
- Mayers with the Calgary Flames in 2010
- Born: October 24, 1974 (age 52) Toronto, Ontario, Canada
- Height: 6 ft 1 in (185 cm)
- Weight: 222 lb (101 kg; 15 st 12 lb)
- Position: Right wing
- Shot: Right
- Played for: St. Louis Blues; Toronto Maple Leafs; Calgary Flames; San Jose Sharks; Chicago Blackhawks
- National team: Canada
- NHL draft: 89th overall, 1993; St. Louis Blues
- Playing career: 1996–2013

Jamal David Mayers (born October 24, 1974) is a Canadian former professional ice hockey winger who played 15 seasons in the National Hockey League (NHL). He spent time playing for the St. Louis Blues, Toronto Maple Leafs, Calgary Flames, San Jose Sharks and won the Stanley Cup with the Chicago Blackhawks in 2013. He is currently an analyst for Sportsnet.

== Playing career ==
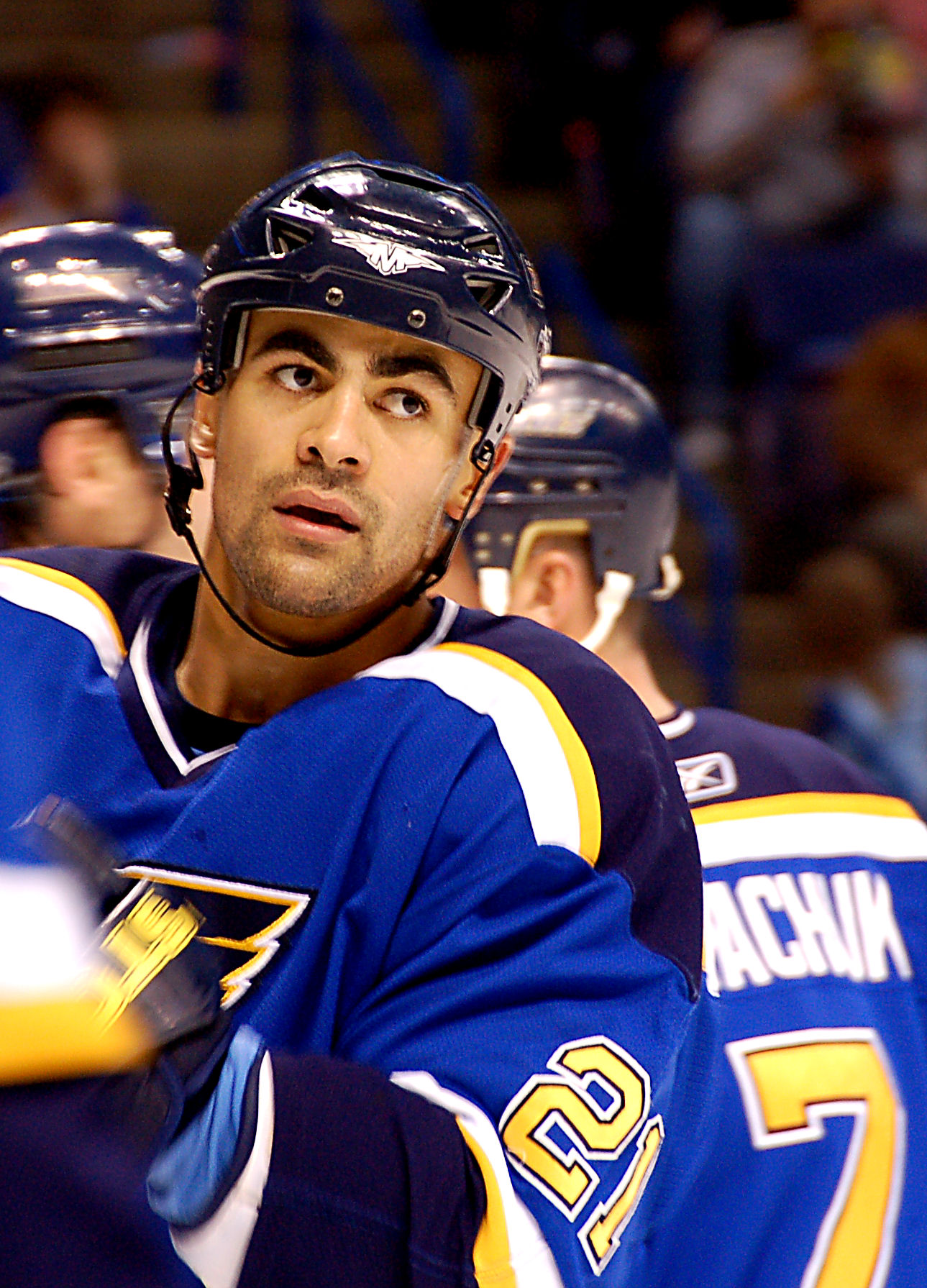
Mayers in November 2006 with the St. Louis Blues

Prior to being drafted in the NHL, Mayers was a star player at Western Michigan University from 1992 to 1996.

Mayers was drafted 89th overall by the St. Louis Blues in the 1993 NHL entry draft and played 10 seasons for the Blues until he was traded to the Toronto Maple Leafs in exchange for a third-round pick in the 2008 NHL entry draft on June 19, 2008, one day before the draft.

On January 31, 2010, Mayers was traded along with Matt Stajan, Niklas Hagman and Ian White to the Calgary Flames for Dion Phaneuf, Fredrik Sjöström and prospect Keith Aulie. Mayers signed with the San Jose Sharks as a free agent at the end of the season for a one-year contract.

On June 20, 2011, Sharks General Manager Doug Wilson announced that Mayers would not be re-signed for the 2011–12 season.

On July 1, 2011, Mayers signed with the Chicago Blackhawks to a one-year contract worth $550,000. The Blackhawks re-signed Mayers to a one-year contract worth $600,000 for the 2012–13 season. On April 5, 2012, late in the 2011–12 season, Mayers was headbutted by the Minnesota Wild's Nate Prosser during a scrum in front of the net. Prosser apologized to Mayers after the game, and was given a one-game suspension for his actions by the NHL.

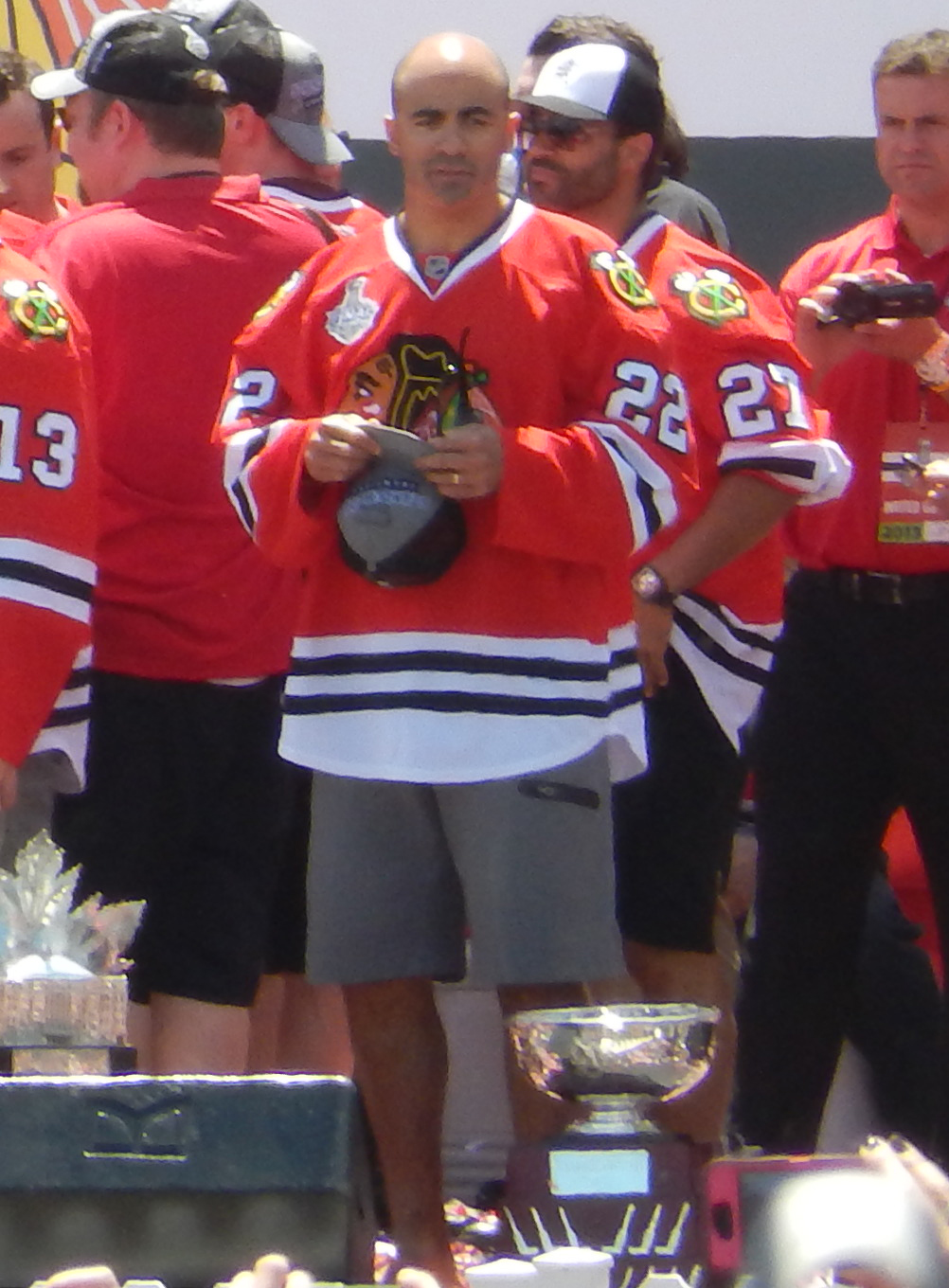
Mayers as a Blackhawk in June 2013 at the 2013 Stanley Cup championship parade

On June 24, 2013, Mayers won the Stanley Cup as a member of the Chicago Blackhawks when they defeated the Boston Bruins in game six of the 2013 Stanley Cup Final. This was Mayers' first Stanley Cup win in his 15 seasons in the NHL. Him being the oldest player on the team and his wait to hoist the trophy was recognized by his teammates, as he was the third person to hoist it, after captain Jonathan Toews and Michal Handzus. Despite him not playing in the 2013 playoffs and playing in 19 games in the 48 game lockout-shortened regular season (four games short from the 23 game requirement for the abbreviated season), the Blackhawks were successful in petitioning to have Mayers' name engraved on the Stanley Cup.

On December 13, 2013, Mayers officially announced his retirement from the NHL.

== International play ==
Mayers was a member of the Canadian 2007 IIHF World Championship team that won gold in a 4–2 win against Finland in Moscow. He was also a member of the Canadian 2008 IIHF World Championship team, helping Canada take home the silver medal.

== Broadcasting ==
Mayers has been a pre-game, post-game, and intermission commentator for the Chicago Blackhawks on NBC Sports Chicago since the 2014-15 season while also serving as a community liaison for the Blackhawks. He also works with Rogers Sportsnet, providing analysis and has done colour commentary during games. Since 2024–25, Mayers has also served as an intermission analyst and occasional color commentator for San Jose Sharks broadcasts on NBC Sports California and the Sharks Audio Network.

== Career statistics ==
=== Regular season and playoffs ===
			Regular season					Playoffs
Season	Team	League	GP	G	A	Pts	PIM	GP	G	A	Pts	PIM
1990–91	Thornhill Thunderbirds	MetJHL	44	12	24	36	78	—	—	—	—	—
1991–92	Thornhill Thunderbirds	MetJHL	39	24	47	71	37	17	14	22	36	0
1992–93	Western Michigan University	CCHA	38	8	17	25	26	—	—	—	—	—
1993–94	Western Michigan University	CCHA	40	17	32	49	40	—	—	—	—	—
1994–95	Western Michigan University	CCHA	39	13	33	46	40	—	—	—	—	—
1995–96	Western Michigan University	CCHA	38	17	22	39	75	—	—	—	—	—
1996–97	Worcester IceCats	AHL	62	12	14	26	104	5	4	5	9	4
1996–97	St. Louis Blues	NHL	6	0	1	1	2	—	—	—	—	—
1997–98	Worcester IceCats	AHL	61	19	24	43	117	11	3	4	7	10
1998–99	Worcester IceCats	AHL	20	9	7	16	24	—	—	—	—	—
1998–99	St. Louis Blues	NHL	34	4	5	9	40	11	0	1	1	8
1999–2000	St. Louis Blues	NHL	79	7	10	17	90	7	0	4	4	2
2000–01	St. Louis Blues	NHL	77	8	13	21	117	15	2	3	5	8
2001–02	St. Louis Blues	NHL	77	9	8	17	99	10	3	0	3	2
2002–03	St. Louis Blues	NHL	15	2	5	7	8	—	—	—	—	—
2003–04	St. Louis Blues	NHL	80	6	5	11	91	5	0	0	0	0
2004–05	Hammarby IF	Allsv	19	9	13	22	36	—	—	—	—	—
2004–05	Missouri River Otters	UHL	13	5	2	7	68	—	—	—	—	—
2005–06	St. Louis Blues	NHL	67	15	11	26	129	—	—	—	—	—
2006–07	St. Louis Blues	NHL	80	8	14	22	89	—	—	—	—	—
2007–08	St. Louis Blues	NHL	80	12	15	27	91	—	—	—	—	—
2008–09	Toronto Maple Leafs	NHL	71	7	9	16	82	—	—	—	—	—
2009–10	Toronto Maple Leafs	NHL	44	2	6	8	78	—	—	—	—	—
2009–10	Calgary Flames	NHL	27	1	5	6	53	—	—	—	—	—
2010–11	San Jose Sharks	NHL	78	3	11	14	124	12	0	0	0	12
2011–12	Chicago Blackhawks	NHL	81	6	9	15	91	3	0	0	0	0
2012–13	Chicago Blackhawks	NHL	19	0	2	2	16	—	—	—	—	—
NHL totals			915	90	129	219	1200	63	5	8	13	32

=== International ===
Medal record

Representing Canada

Ice hockey

World Championships
Gold medal – first place	2007 Moscow	
Silver medal – second place	2008 Halifax/Quebec City	

Year	Team	Event	Result	GP	G	A	Pts	PIM
2000	Canada	WC	4th	7	1	0	1	2
2007	Canada	WC	1st place, gold medalist(s)	9	4	1	5	8
2008	Canada	WC	2nd place, silver medalist(s)	9	2	3	5	2
Senior totals				25	7	4	11	12

== See also ==
- List of black NHL players
