= Randy Hahn =

Canadian sports broadcaster (born 1958)

- Hahn in 2026
- Born: October 21, 1958 (age 68); Edmonton, Alberta, Canada
- Occupation: Sportscaster
- Known for: Hockey commentator / analyst Radio broadcaster

Randy Hahn (born October 21, 1958) is a Canadian-American play-by-play commentator for the San Jose Sharks on NBC Sports California, and has held that position for over 30 seasons. He has over 40 years of broadcast experience, mostly in hockey. Randy Hahn has worked the Stanley Cup Playoffs for TNT since 2022. He broadcast his 2,000th Sharks game on December 13, 2022, when the Sharks faced the Arizona Coyotes in San Jose. Along with analyst Drew Remenda, Hahn has won five Northern California Emmy Awards in the "On Camera Sports" section; one in 1999, and others in 2002, 2005, and 2008. Hahn was a PBP announcer in Konami's NHL Blades of Steel '99 and 2K Sports' NHL 2K9, NHL 2K10, and NHL 2K11.

== Early life ==
Hahn was born in 1958 in Edmonton but moved to Whitehorse, Yukon at the age of 14. He attended F. H. Collins Secondary School with mayor Ernie Bourassa. At the age of 15, Hahn was hired for a weekend shift as a disc jockey at CKRW. His first live play-by-play was covering the Sourdough Rendezvous dog races on Dandelion Heights, which he refers to as a "paw by paw." During his tenure with the station, Bob Sudeyko and him interviewed their friends to pass the time while stuck in the transmitter shack on Grey Mountain, and said at the end of the night they even interviewed a chipmunk. After graduating from high school, Hahn attended the University of British Columbia where he accepted a job offer from a Vancouver radio station working broadcasts for the National Hockey League and Canadian Football League teams. This eventually led to a play-by-play job with the Edmonton Drillers soccer team.

== Career ==
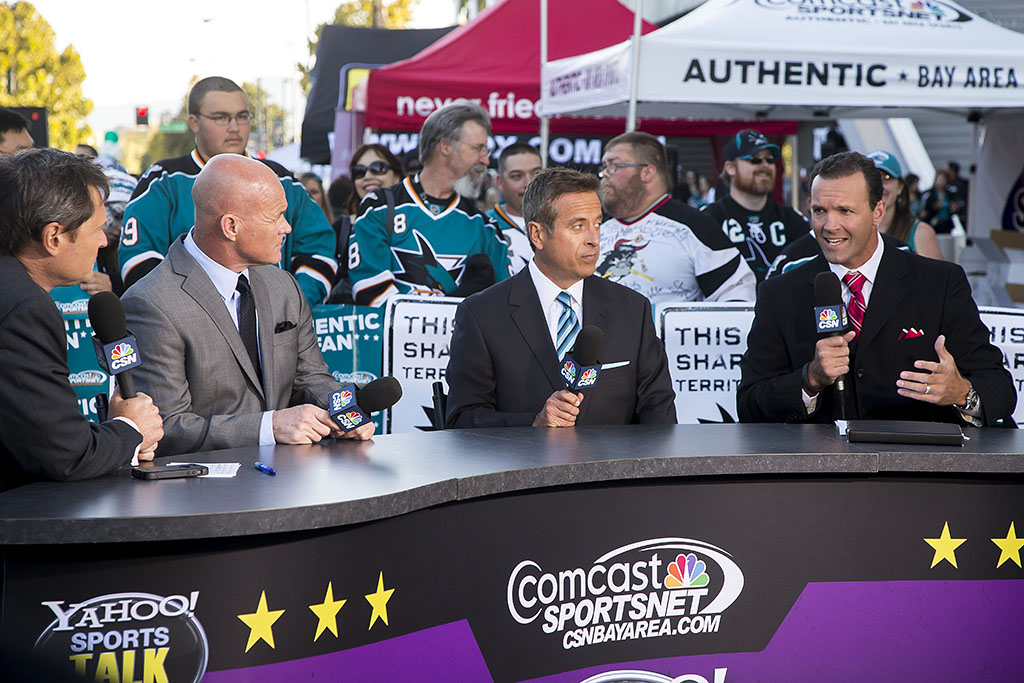
Drew Remenda, Hahn and Bret Hedican at the San Jose Sharks Opening Night Street Rally in 2013

His 1980s TV work included Ivy League Game of the Week football broadcasts.

Hahn and Rick Davis called the final of the first FIFA Women's World Cup from Guangzhou, China for SportsChannel America in November 1991. He has also worked as a play by play announcer for ESPN and ABC during the 1994 FIFA World Cup.

Some of his other TV and radio work has been with the San Diego Sockers, Los Angeles Kings, Vancouver Canucks, and Edmonton Oilers.

Shortly before the Sharks were formed, Hahn was vice president of a non-profit organization known as Pro Hockey San Jose. The purpose was to draw attention to the newly approved arena in the city, and hopefully acquire an NHL team for San Jose (both the team and the arena did come to fruition, with the San Jose Arena opening in 1993 and the Sharks beginning play at the Cow Palace in 1991).

Because Hahn is an avid wine connoisseur, he would frequent the Sonoma Harvest Valley wine auction in Sonoma County. There, he met Pixar producer and director John Lasseter in the early 2000s and developed a friendship. Lasseter called Hahn in 2013 and asked him to voice the hockey announcer in the award-winning film Inside Out. Hahn can be heard during the dinner scene when Riley’s dad is replaying a hockey game in his mind. He returned to Pixar to reprise this role for Inside Out 2.

== Personal life ==
Hahn was married to Roberta Gonzales, a current meteorologist for KTVU-TV (Fox 2) Oakland, CA.

On June 8, 1995, Hahn was arrested on a charge of drug possession after signing for a package containing amphetamines that was delivered to his home in Orland Park, Illinois. The charges were dropped a week later after the police realized that Hahn had been set up by a stalker who was after Gonzales, who was then the morning meteorologist for WMAQ-TV in Chicago.

On October 17, 2021, he married Andrea Buswell Hahn, owner of Frost Cupcake Factory in San Jose. They had a private ceremony at their home in Gilroy, California.

In July 2022, Hahn obtained United States Citizenship, after 40 years of broadcasting and living in the US.
