= Bret Hedican =

American ice hockey player (born 1970)

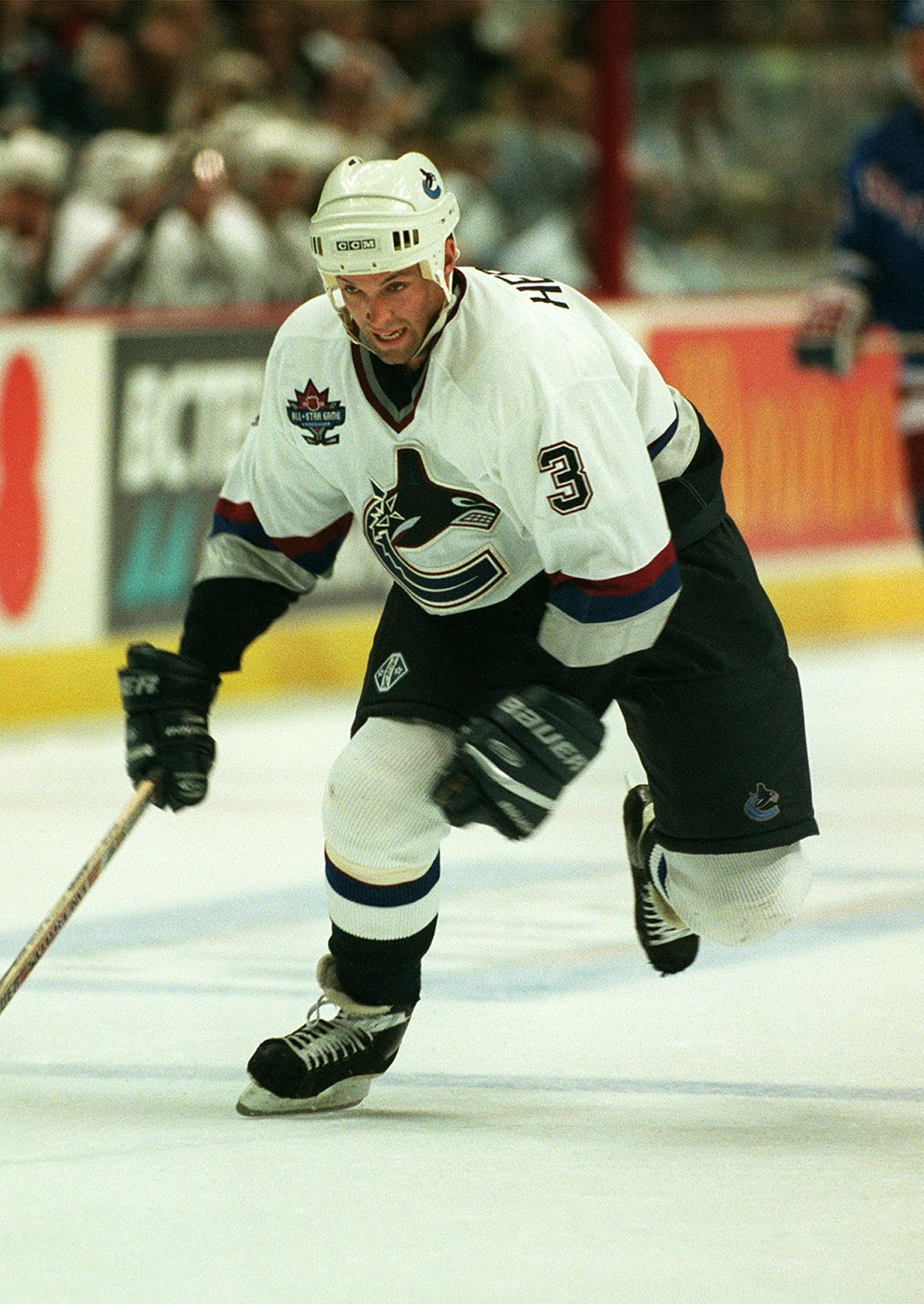
- Hedican with the Vancouver Canucks in 1997
- Born: August 10, 1970 (age 55) Saint Paul, Minnesota, U.S.
- Height: 6 ft 2 in (188 cm)
- Weight: 210 lb (95 kg; 15 st 0 lb)
- Position: Defense
- Shot: Left
- Played for: St. Louis Blues; Vancouver Canucks; Florida Panthers; Carolina Hurricanes; Anaheim Ducks
- National team: United States
- NHL draft: 198th overall, 1988; St. Louis Blues
- Playing career: 1991–2009

Bret Michael Hedican (born August 10, 1970) is an American former professional ice hockey player, a Stanley Cup champion and a two-time US Olympian. After playing for St. Cloud State University, Hedican played with the 1992 US Olympic Team before he made his NHL debut in the 1991–92 season with the St. Louis Blues. In his third season with the Blues, Hedican was traded to the Vancouver Canucks with Jeff Brown and Nathan LaFayette for Craig Janney, on March 21, 1994, joining the Canucks in time for their Stanley Cup Final run that season.

== Early life ==
Hedican was born on August 10, 1970, in Saint Paul, Minnesota to parents Gerald and Theresa. He grew up alongside his older sister Kelly, who later married his St. Cloud State University teammate Scott Eichstadt. She began dating Eichstadt while Hedican was playing with Team USA at the 1992 Winter Olympics.

== Playing career ==
=== Amateur ===
Growing up in North Saint Paul, Minnesota, Hedican attended North St. Paul High School who retired his jersey number in 2006, meaning no player on the team may wear that number. During his high school career, he played four sports: hockey, football, soccer, and golf. Hedican played football in his freshman season before switching to soccer as a sophomore and junior, despite never playing it before. In his junior year, Hedican grew increasingly upset about his lack of playing time and spent the entire offseason bulking up. After experiencing a growth spurt as a senior, in which he grew seven inches, he returned to football.

As a senior, Hedican started the hockey season playing his regular position as a winger but was forced to move to defense due to numerous injuries. He proved to be successful in this position and was nominated to The Associated Press All-State team and played in the Maroon and Gold All-Star Series for high school seniors. Although he was approached by many colleges, Hedican chose to play ice hockey for St. Cloud State University due to their scholarship offer. He later said: "It was a great opportunity to turn the program around, as they were bringing in 10 freshmen. We (his teammates) said that to each other, we stuck together and we had a good team while I was there." Prior to committing to St. Cloud, Hedican debated whether to play major junior hockey.

=== Collegiate ===
Hedican was drafted 198th overall by the St. Louis Blues in the 1988 NHL entry draft. At the time of his selection, chief scout Ted Hampson compared his speed to that of a "young Paul Coffey."

In his sophomore season, Hedican returned to defence, replacing Jordy Wingate who took over his center position. When speaking of the decision, Hedican said: "I like to skate it up and see the play in front of me. That's what I liked to do...I've basically played defense all my life." His offensive output also improved, by December he had 11 points in only 16 games. He later said "going to St Cloud was the best thing that happened to me because I got thrown right in there and had to learn a lot." At the conclusion of his junior season, Hedican had recorded 19 goals and 30 assists and was named selected for the All-WCHA First Team. After opting out of his senior season, Hedican owned the team record for most points scored by a defenseman in a season with 48.

=== Professional ===
==== St. Louis Blues ====
Under the tutelage of Herb Brooks, Hedican became the only Twin Cities player named to Team USA's roster for the 1992 Winter Olympics. Brooks had coached him during his time at St. Cloud. He was also placed on the Peoria Rivermen of the International Hockey League. Upon returning from the Olympics, he practised with his collegiate team while contract negotiations continued with the Blues. He did not play any games with the team in case he could not reach an agreement with the Blues, thus maintaining his collegiate eligibility. Hedican eventually signed with the Blues but missed 11 games with a broken foot due to a mistake during practice. He made his NHL debut on March 27, 1992, and recorded his first career NHL goal in a 5–3 win over the Chicago Blackhawks on April 15.

Following his first season, Hedican suffered a knee injury in September that delayed his start to the 1992–93 season. After being medically cleared to play, Hedican made his season debut on November 27 against the Vancouver Canucks in a 7–5 win. Despite not scoring, Blues coach Bob Berry praised Hedican's play for his speed and puck play. He split his time during the season with the Rivermen in order to gain experience and practice. In spite of this, he was invited to the NHL All-Star Game and placed second behind Mike Gartner in the fastest skater competition.

In his third season with the Blues, Hedican was traded to the Vancouver Canucks with Jeff Brown and Nathan LaFayette for Craig Janney, on March 21, 1994, joining the Canucks in time for their Stanley Cup run that season. At the time of the trade, Hedican said: "I have nothing bad to say about St. Louis. They gave me some ice time. I'm sad to leave, but Vancouver wants me."

==== Vancouver Canucks and first Stanley Cup run ====
Hedican joined the Canucks for their Stanley Cup run and recorded the teams' first goal in game one of the Stanley Cup Final on May 31, 1994. After finishing the 1996–97 season with six goals and 23 assists in 77 games, Hedican signed a two-year contract worth just under $2 million to remain with the Canucks on October 10, 1997. In the first year of his contract, he led the league in short-handed assists with seven.

==== Florida Panthers ====
Although Hedican established himself in the Canucks blueline after five seasons he was traded to the Florida Panthers with Pavel Bure, Brad Ference and Vancouver's third round choice (Robert Fried) in the 2000 NHL entry draft for Ed Jovanovski, Dave Gagner, Mike Brown, Kevin Weekes and Florida's first round choice (Nathan Smith) in the 2000 Entry Draft, on January 17, 1999. Hedican finished the season with the Panthers, recording three goals and 10 points in 25 games despite missing 16 games with an eye injury and torn groin muscle. He remained unsigned as the 1999–00 training camp approached but continued to engage in contract discussions. On November 4, 1999, Hedican was suspended three games for slashing during a game against the Ottawa Senators and was docked $25,520.

==== Carolina Hurricanes and second Stanley Cup run ====
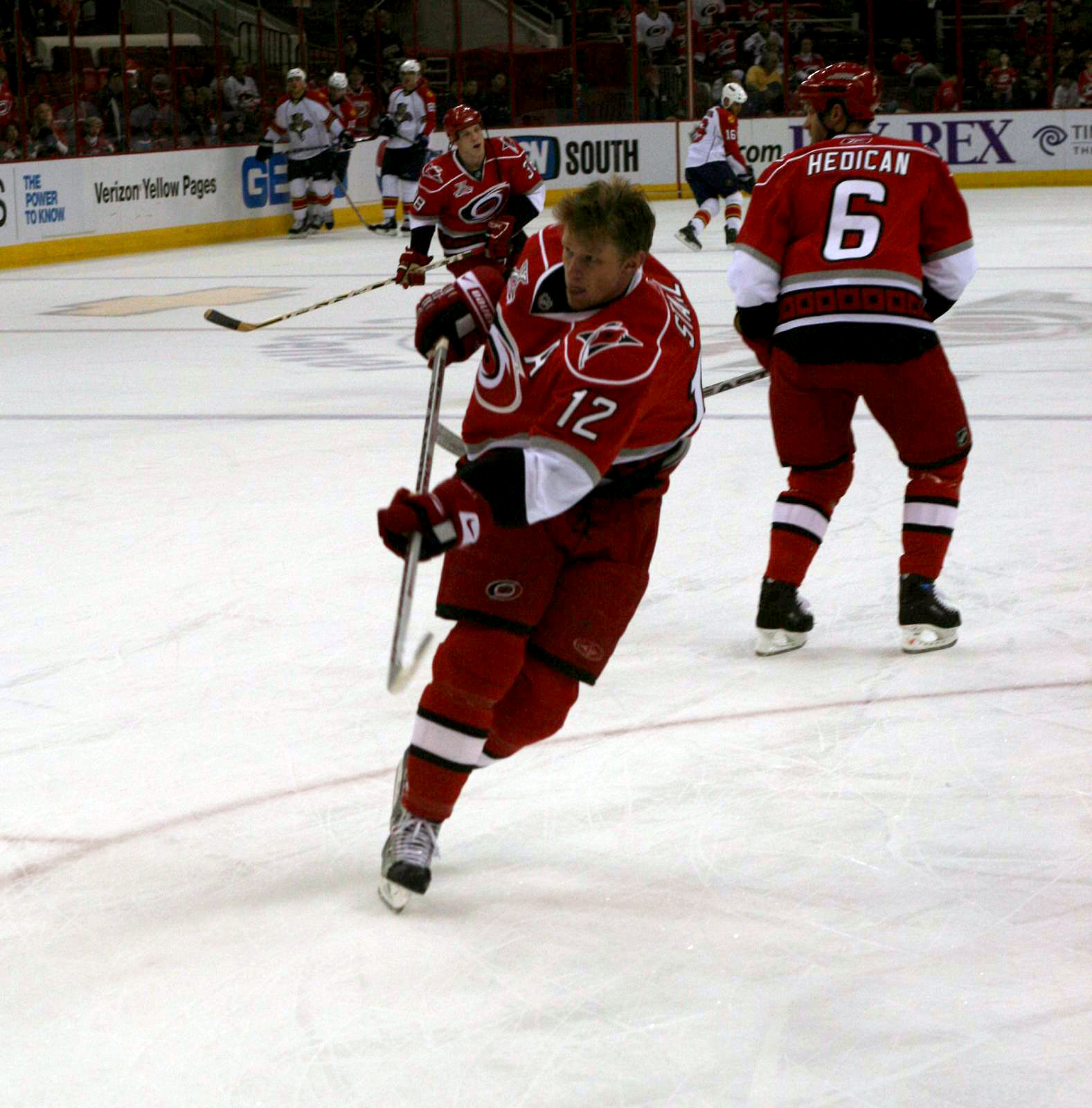
Hedican (back) and Eric Staal with the Carolina Hurricanes in 2008

Hedican was traded by the Panthers with Kevyn Adams and Tomas Malec to the Carolina Hurricanes for Sandis Ozolinsh and Byron Ritchie on January 16, 2002. He was reconnected with Team USA teammate David Tanabe whom he also trained with during the offseason. Hedican made his Hurricanes debut against the Montreal Canadiens the following day and scored his first goal with the team two days later against the New Jersey Devils. During the remainder of the 2002–03 season, Hedican said: "I just want to play in the playoffs I want to work my butt off and worry about my contract at the end of this whole thing." On June 30, 2002, he opted to sign a six-year contract to remain with the team instead of becoming a free agent.

On February 6, 2005, Hedican was named to Team USA's roster for the 2006 Winter Olympics as a replacement for injured defenseman Aaron Miller. During the Hurricanes' Stanley Cup run, Hedican was the team's nomination for the Bill Masterton Memorial Trophy as someone who "best exemplifies the qualities of perseverance, sportsmanship and dedication to hockey." After winning the Cup, it was revealed that Hedican tore the labrum in his right hip in Game 1 of the Cup finals. He played the remainder of the games with the aid of cortisone and pain-relief shots.

His last few seasons in Carolina were riddled with injuries that severely limited his game play. On January 4, 2007, Jim Rutherford announced that Hedican would miss three to four weeks after undergoing surgery to repair a torn ligament in his left ring finger. At the time of his injury, Hedican recorded eight assists in 37 games and led all Hurricanes defensemen in ice time. He was activated off Injured Reserve a month later on February 1 after missing 10 games. Overall, Hedican missed 32 games as a result of various ailments, including the final 16 with a hip injury. He debated retiring during the offseason but chose to return to the Hurricanes for the 2007–08 season. In late December, Hedican suffered a sprained right knee during a game against the Boston Bruins and was placed on Injured Reserve. At the time of his injury, he had recorded two goals and seven assists.

==== Anaheim Ducks and retirement ====
For the 2008–09 season, his last season in the league, Hedican signed a one-year contract with the Anaheim Ducks. He played his 1000th career NHL game on November 21, 2008, against the St. Louis Blues. In February, Hedican began experiencing back spasms and was forced to miss numerous games.

On September 16, 2009, Hedican announced his retirement after playing in 1,039 career regular-season games and recording 294 points. Although he retired, he announced that: "I'd pay [general manager] Jimmy [Rutherford] to let me sign for a dollar and put the jersey on again."

== Post-retirement ==
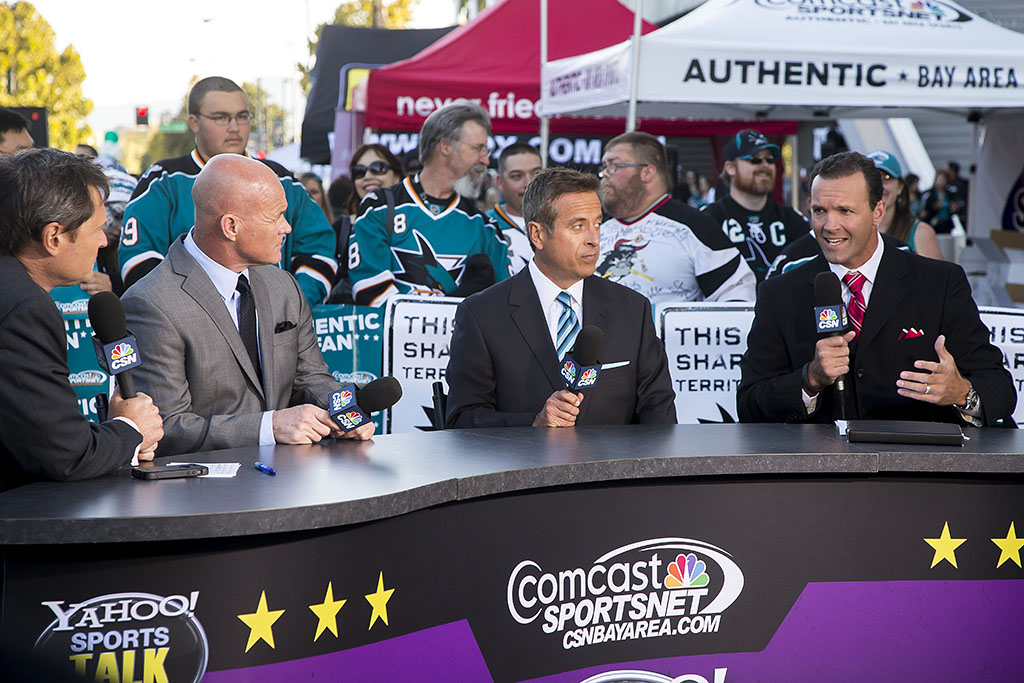
Remenda, Hahn and Hedican at the San Jose Sharks Opening Night Street Rally in 2013

Hedican joined NBC Sports California shortly after retiring, serving as a studio analyst and "Inside-the-Glass" reporter for select home games for the channel's San Jose Sharks coverage. In the fall of 2014, he joined the Sharks Radio Network team, and either Baker or Hedican provided color commentary alongside Dan Rusanowsky. He also called games with Randy Hahn and Jamie Baker on NBCSN and NBC Sports California before Baker retired.

In 2014, Hedican partnered with another former Vancouver Canuck, Paul Reinhart, investing over $1 million in a sports team management start-up, RosterBot, based in Vancouver. The web-based software allowed users to set up a team, add player profiles, assign people to positions and share schedules by synchronizing them with calendars on other devices.

In late July 2024, Hedican left NBC to work as a player development analyst for the San Diego Gulls, the AHL affiliate team of the Anaheim Ducks.

== Personal life ==
Hedican married figure skater Kristi Yamaguchi in 2000. They first met at the 1992 Olympic Winter Games when both were members of the U.S. Olympic team. They share two daughters: Keara and Emma. They separated in 2023 and divorced in 2025.

== Career statistics ==
=== Regular season and playoffs ===
			Regular season					Playoffs
Season	Team	League	GP	G	A	Pts	PIM	GP	G	A	Pts	PIM
1987–88	North St. Paul High School	HS-MN	23	15	19	34	16	—	—	—	—	—
1988–89	St. Cloud State University	WCHA	28	5	3	8	28	—	—	—	—	—
1989–90	St. Cloud State University	WCHA	36	4	17	21	37	—	—	—	—	—
1990–91	St. Cloud State University	WCHA	41	18	30	48	52	—	—	—	—	—
1991–92	St. Louis Blues	NHL	4	1	0	1	0	5	0	0	0	0
1992–93	Peoria Rivermen	IHL	19	0	8	8	10	—	—	—	—	—
1992–93	St. Louis Blues	NHL	42	0	8	8	30	10	0	0	0	14
1993–94	St. Louis Blues	NHL	61	0	11	11	64	—	—	—	—	—
1993–94	Vancouver Canucks	NHL	8	0	1	1	0	24	1	6	7	16
1994–95	Vancouver Canucks	NHL	45	2	11	13	34	11	0	2	2	6
1995–96	Vancouver Canucks	NHL	77	6	23	29	83	6	0	1	1	10
1996–97	Vancouver Canucks	NHL	67	4	15	19	51	—	—	—	—	—
1997–98	Vancouver Canucks	NHL	71	3	24	27	79	—	—	—	—	—
1998–99	Vancouver Canucks	NHL	42	2	11	13	34	—	—	—	—	—
1998–99	Florida Panthers	NHL	25	3	7	10	17	—	—	—	—	—
1999–2000	Florida Panthers	NHL	76	6	19	25	68	4	0	0	0	0
2000–01	Florida Panthers	NHL	70	5	15	20	72	—	—	—	—	—
2001–02	Florida Panthers	NHL	31	3	7	10	12	—	—	—	—	—
2001–02	Carolina Hurricanes	NHL	26	2	4	6	10	23	1	4	5	20
2002–03	Carolina Hurricanes	NHL	72	3	14	17	75	—	—	—	—	—
2003–04	Carolina Hurricanes	NHL	81	7	17	24	64	—	—	—	—	—
2005–06	Carolina Hurricanes	NHL	74	5	22	27	58	25	2	9	11	42
2006–07	Carolina Hurricanes	NHL	50	0	10	10	36	—	—	—	—	—
2007–08	Carolina Hurricanes	NHL	66	2	15	17	70	—	—	—	—	—
2008–09	Anaheim Ducks	NHL	51	1	5	6	36	—	—	—	—	—
NHL totals			1,039	55	239	294	893	108	4	22	26	108

=== International ===
Year	Team	Event	Result	GP	G	A	Pts	PIM
1992	United States	OG	4th	8	0	0	0	4
1997	United States	WC	6th	8	0	5	5	10
1999	United States	WC	6th	6	0	1	1	8
2001	United States	WC	4th	9	2	2	4	0
2006	United States	OG	8th	6	0	1	1	6
Senior totals				37	2	9	11	28

== Awards and honours ==
Award	Year
College
All-WCHA First Team	1991
NHL
Stanley Cup (Carolina Hurricanes)	2006

== See also ==
- List of NHL players with 1,000 games played
