= NBC Sports California =

- Country: United States
- Broadcast area: Northern California; Southern California; Portions of Oregon; Western Nevada; National (via satellite)
- Network: NBC Sports Regional Networks
- Headquarters: 360 3rd St, San Francisco, CA 94107

Programming
- Languages: English; Spanish (via SAP)
- Picture format: 1080i (HDTV); 480i (SDTV)

Ownership
- Owner: NBC Sports Group
- Sister channels: Cable/satellite: NBC Sports Bay Area; Broadcast: KNTV/San Jose; KSTS/San Francisco; KCSO/Sacramento; KNBC/Los Angeles; KVEA/Corona; KNSD/San Diego

History
- Launched: October 2004
- Former names: Comcast SportsNet West (2004–2008); Comcast SportsNet California (2008–2017)

Links
- Website: www.nbcsportscalifornia.com

Availability

Streaming media
- Peacock: peacocktv.com (U.S. internet subscribers in eligible area only; requires add-on to subscription to access content)
- DirecTV Stream: Internet Protocol television
- YouTubeTV: Internet Protocol television
- Hulu Live: Internet Protocol television
- FuboTV: Internet Protocol television

NBC Sports California (sometimes abbreviated as NBCS California) is an American regional sports network owned by the NBC Sports Group unit of NBCUniversal, and operates as an affiliate of NBC Sports Regional Networks. The channel broadcasts regional coverage of professional and college sports events throughout Northern California, as well as original sports-related news, discussion and entertainment programming.

NBC Sports California is available on cable and fiber optic television providers throughout northern and southern California, and portions of Oregon and western Nevada. It is also available nationwide on satellite via DirecTV. The network maintains main studios and offices headquartered with sister network NBC Sports Bay Area in San Francisco, California.

== History ==
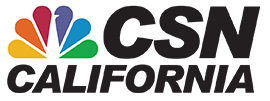
Comcast SportsNet California logo from October 1, 2008, to April 1, 2017

In summer 2003, Comcast acquired the regional television rights to broadcast regular-season and early-round playoff games from the Sacramento Kings. Previously, the team's game broadcasts were only available either via pay-per-view sports packages and on an alternate feed of then Cablevision-owned SportsChannel Bay Area. As a result, Comcast created a new regional sports network to broadcast the team's games; the network launched as Comcast SportsNet West in October 2004, coinciding with the start of the Kings' regular season.

Although the network originally focused on the Northern California region, it began expanding its coverage to serve as a complement to Comcast SportsNet Bay Area. This began with the network's rebranding to Comcast SportsNet California in September 2008; it subsequently became the official broadcaster of the Oakland Athletics (which previously broadcast their games on Comcast SportsNet Bay Area, in addition to the San Francisco Giants) for the 2009 Major League Baseball season, broadcasting 145 regular-season games that year (an increase by 37 telecasts from the 2008 season). The San Jose Sharks followed the A's from CSN Bay Area for the 2009–10 NHL season, seeing a similar increase in game broadcasts with 75 games being shown overall (50 of which were televised in high definition). With the relaunch, Comcast SportsNet Bay Area and California merged editorial coverage on their respective regional websites. Many cable providers in the San Francisco Bay Area that previously carried CSN California via digital cable have since moved the network to basic cable tiers.

In September 2009, CSN California's carriage agreement with Dish Network expired; however, the satellite provider continued to carry the network in the interim while the two parties attempted to reach a renewed contract. Negotiations went on for months, leading Dish to file a request with the Federal Communications Commission to enter into arbitration hearings to formalize a deal. Dish Network lost its case and dropped Comcast SportsNet California from its lineup on November 24, 2010. On February 3, 2011, Dish Network restored CSN California after the satellite provider reached an agreement to carry the channel without any legal arbitration.

In September 2012, Comcast SportsNet California and its sister Comcast SportsNet outlets ceased carrying Fox Sports Networks-supplied programming, after failing to reach an agreement to continue carrying FSN's nationally distributed programs.

In July 2014, CSN California reached a new 20-year deal for regional rights to the Sacramento Kings beginning in the 2013–14 season, estimated to be worth nearly $700 million over the length of the contract. The contract increased the number of games CSN broadcasts per-season from 70 to 80 over the previous season (where a package was syndicated to terrestrial television), saw the network take over advertising sales during the telecasts, and commit to broadcasting an increased amount of team-related programming (including pre- and post-game shows, and a monthly Kings Central program).

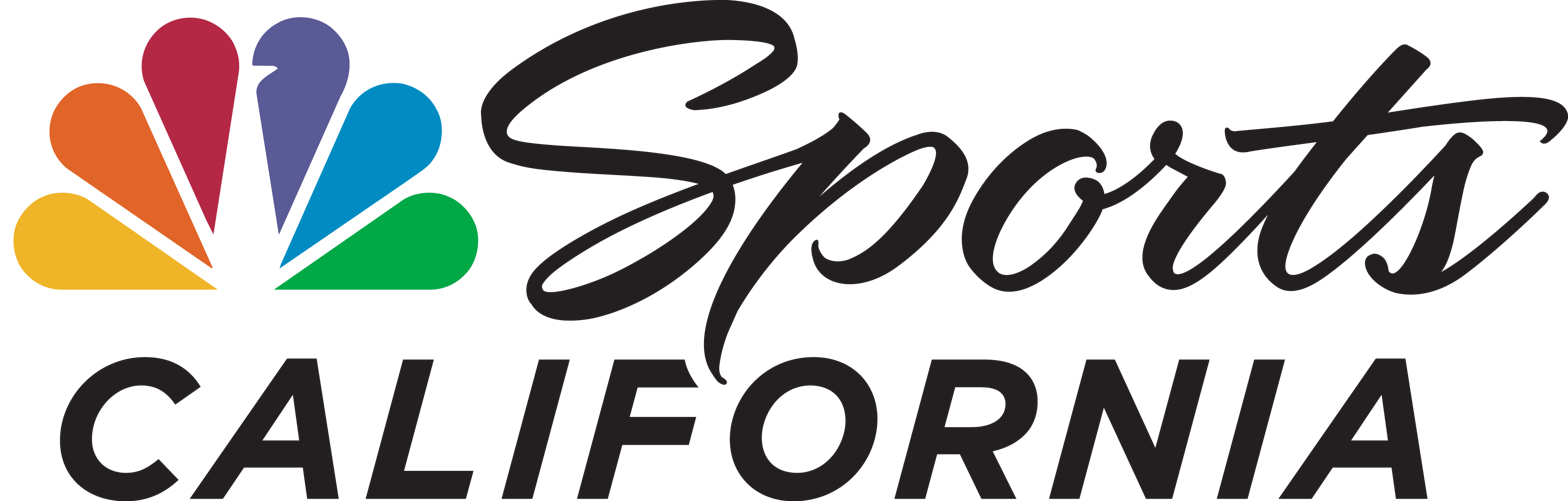
Logo of NBC Sports Bay Area used from April 2, 2017 until 2023

On March 22, 2017, Comcast announced that CSN California would be rebranded NBC Sports California on April 2, 2017, in a move meant to "better associate the prestigious NBC Sports legacy with the strength of our Comcast Sports Networks' local sports coverage in Northern California".

== Programming ==
=== Sports coverage ===
NBC Sports California holds the regional cable television rights to the Athletics of Major League Baseball, the NHL's San Jose Sharks, and the NBA's Sacramento Kings. The network produces its pre-game and post-game shows for the A's either on-site during home games, or on the SportsNet Central set at the NBC Sports Bay Area studios during road games. The station also airs Shark Byte, a magazine program focusing on the San Jose Sharks that originated on Comcast SportsNet Bay Area.

The network also simulcasts NBC Sports Bay Area-produced telecasts of games involving the San Francisco Giants Major League Baseball franchise and the San Jose Earthquakes of Major League Soccer. The network also carries games from the San Jose Barracuda of the American Hockey League. It formerly broadcast games from the WNBA's Sacramento Monarchs until the team folded in 2009; the Sacramento Mountain Lions from 2009 until the United Football League folded; the PASL's Stockton Cougars until that team folded in 2011, and the AFL's San Jose SaberCats. The network also carries programming related to the NFL's Las Vegas Raiders in a carryover from when the team played in Oakland.

NBC Sports California also televises college sports involving Northern California schools, including St. Mary's College, the University of San Francisco, the University of the Pacific, and Santa Clara University. The channel formerly broadcast sporting events involving the California Golden Bears and Stanford Cardinal that were not on national television until the formation of the Pac-12 Network in August 2012. Select high school sports events are also occasionally broadcast on the network, including weekly high school football games on Friday nights during the fall.

=== Other programming ===
NBC Sports California currently carries the NBC Sports Bay Area original program Chronicle Live, a sports discussion program produced in conjunction with the San Francisco Chronicle, each weeknight at 12:00 a.m. The network also carries a live video simulcast of The Gary Radnich Show (hosted by the longtime sports anchor at MyNetworkTV affiliate KRON-TV) from KNBR (680 and 1050 AM) in San Francisco each weekday from 9:00 a.m. to 12:00 p.m., except on rare occasions when it is pre-empted by a live sporting event on either outlet. NBC Sports California previously also broadcast the "Raiders Report", a weekly show featuring news and game highlights on the Oakland Raiders. In September 2009, the program was replaced by a live post-game show airing immediately after network telecasts of Raiders games.

== On-air staff ==
=== Current on-air staff ===
- Shooty Babitt – Athletics studio analyst
- Roxy Bernstein – Athletics alternate play-by-play announcer
- Dallas Braden – Athletics color commentator
- Chris Caray – Athletics alternate play-by-play announcer
- Jenny Cavnar – Athletics play–by–play announcer
- Vince Cotroneo – Athletics alternate play-by-play announcer
- Kayte Christensen – Sacramento Kings color commentator
- Jason Demers - Sharks alternate color commentator
- Johnny Doskow – Athletics alternate play-by-play announcer
- Randy Hahn – Sharks play-by-play announcer
- Scott Hannan - Sharks alternate color commentator
- Alan Hoshida - Sharks studio host
- Drew Remenda – Sharks lead color commentator
- Mark Jones – Kings play-by-play announcer
- Ken Korach – Athletics alternate play-by-play announcer
- Jamal Mayers - Sharks alternate color commentator
- Danielle Slaton – Earthquakes sideline reporter
- Mark Smith - Sharks studio analyst
- Alex Stalock - Sharks alternate color commentator

== Related services ==
=== NBC Sports California HD ===
NBC Sports California HD is a 1080i high-definition simulcast feed of NBC Sports California. The feed broadcasts all Sacramento Kings home game telecasts, as well as all San Jose Sharks games in HD. In 2010, CSN California began broadcasting all Athletics games in high definition. Sometime afterwards, the SD feed of CSN/NBC Sports California became a simulcast of the HD feed downscaled to 480i via letterboxing.
