= Scott Hannan =

Canadian ice hockey player (born 1979)

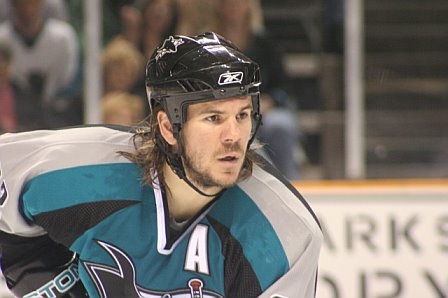
- Hannan with the San Jose Sharks in 2007
- Born: January 23, 1979 (age 47) Richmond, British Columbia, Canada
- Height: 6 ft 1 in (185 cm)
- Weight: 225 lb (102 kg; 16 st 1 lb)
- Position: Defence
- Shot: Left
- Played for: San Jose Sharks; Colorado Avalanche; Washington Capitals; Calgary Flames; Nashville Predators
- National team: Canada
- NHL draft: 23rd overall, 1997; San Jose Sharks
- Playing career: 1998–2015

Kenneth Scott Hannan (born January 23, 1979) is a Canadian former professional ice hockey player. Hannan was born in Richmond, British Columbia, but grew up in Surrey, British Columbia.

== Playing career ==
As a youth, Hannan played in the 1992 Quebec International Pee-Wee Hockey Tournament with a minor ice hockey team from Surrey, British Columbia.

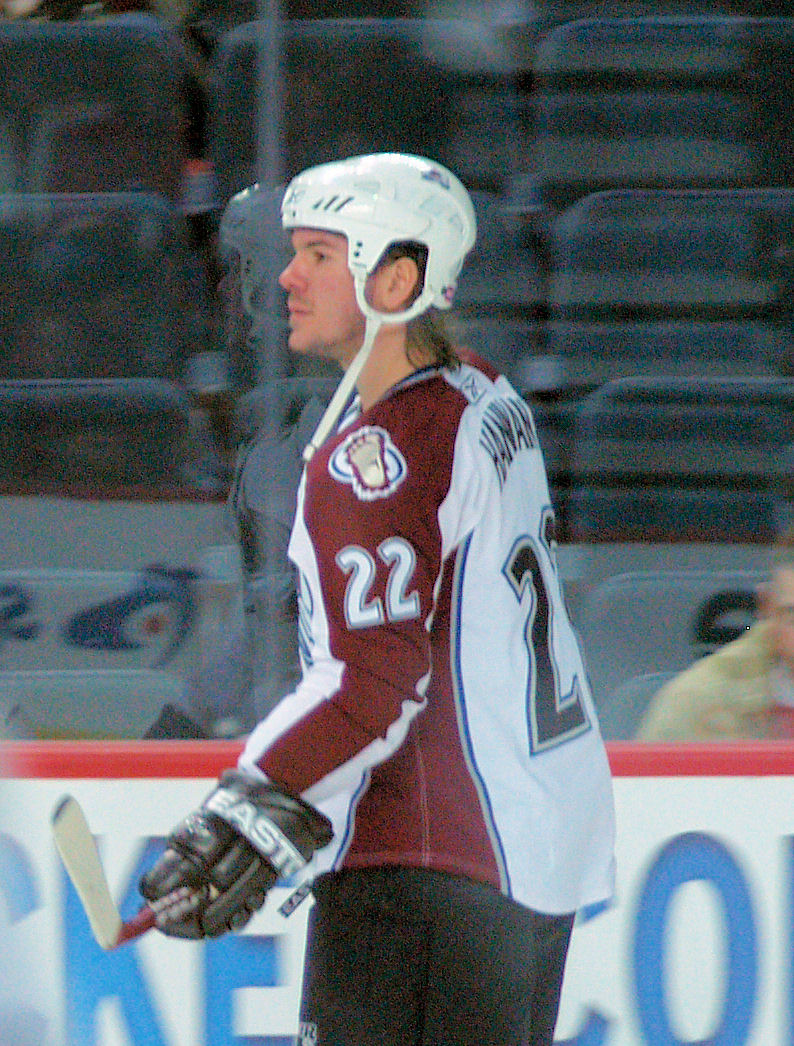
Hannan playing for the Avalanche.

Hannan was selected in the first round of the 1997 NHL entry draft, 23rd overall, by the San Jose Sharks from the Kelowna Rockets of the Western Hockey League (WHL). He made his professional debut at the start of the 1998–99 season with the Sharks, playing in five games before returning to the Rockets for his last year of junior eligibility. Hannan then split the 1999–2000 season, his first full professional season, with the Sharks and their American Hockey League (AHL) affiliate, the Kentucky Thoroughblades.

Hannan became a mainstay on the Sharks' defence corps from the 2000–01 season and evolved as an effective, gritty, shut-down defenceman, earning a selection to the 2001 NHL All-Star Game for the Western Conference in the 2003–04 season. Hannan emerged as a premier defenceman during the 2004 Stanley Cup playoffs, gaining praise for his performance in shutting down star Colorado Avalanche centre Peter Forsberg in the Western Conference Semi-final over Colorado. Hannan played his 500th NHL game at the end of the 2006–07 season in a 4–3 loss to the Avalanche on March 18, 2007.

On July 1, 2007, Hannan signed a four-year, $18 million contract with the Colorado Avalanche.

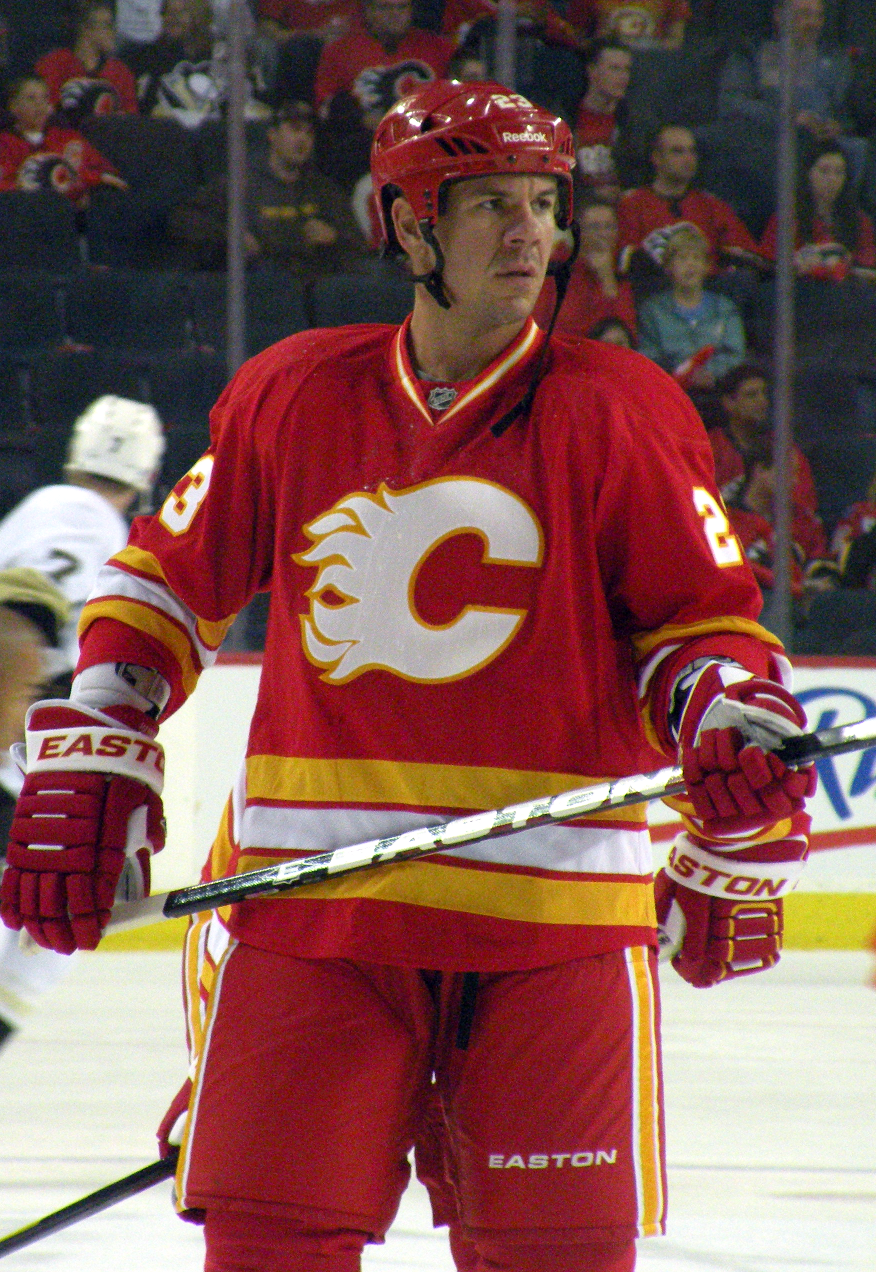
Hannan while with the Calgary Flames during the 2011–12 season.

On November 30, 2010, Hannan was traded from Colorado to the Washington Capitals in exchange for Tomáš Fleischmann.

On August 13, 2011, the Calgary Flames signed Hannan as a free agent to a one-year, $1 million contract.

On August 17, 2012, the Nashville Predators signed Hannan as a free agent to a one-year, $1 million contract.

On April 3, 2013, Hannan returned to the San Jose Sharks via trade in exchange for a conditional seventh round draft pick in 2013. Hannan became an unrestricted free agent after the season's end, and on July 5, 2013, but eventually he re-signed with the Sharks on a one-year contract. He played his 1,000th career NHL game on October 14, 2014, against the Washington Capitals.

Hannan announced his retirement on February 24, 2016, after 16 seasons in the NHL.

== Career statistics ==
=== Regular season and playoffs ===
			Regular season					Playoffs
Season	Team	League	GP	G	A	Pts	PIM	GP	G	A	Pts	PIM
1994–95	Tacoma Rockets	WHL	2	0	0	0	0	—	—	—	—	—
1995–96	Kelowna Rockets	WHL	69	4	5	9	76	6	0	1	1	4
1996–97	Kelowna Rockets	WHL	70	17	26	43	101	6	0	0	0	8
1997–98	Kelowna Rockets	WHL	47	10	30	40	70	7	2	7	9	14
1998–99	Kelowna Rockets	WHL	47	15	30	45	92	6	1	2	3	14
1998–99	Kentucky Thoroughblades	AHL	2	0	0	0	2	12	0	2	2	10
1998–99	San Jose Sharks	NHL	5	0	2	2	6	—	—	—	—	—
1999–2000	Kentucky Thoroughblades	AHL	41	5	12	17	40	—	—	—	—	—
1999–2000	San Jose Sharks	NHL	30	1	2	3	10	1	0	1	1	0
2000–01	San Jose Sharks	NHL	75	3	14	17	51	6	0	1	1	6
2001–02	San Jose Sharks	NHL	75	2	12	14	57	12	0	2	2	12
2002–03	San Jose Sharks	NHL	81	3	19	22	61	—	—	—	—	—
2003–04	San Jose Sharks	NHL	82	6	15	21	48	17	1	5	6	22
2005–06	San Jose Sharks	NHL	81	6	18	24	58	11	0	1	1	6
2006–07	San Jose Sharks	NHL	79	4	20	24	38	11	0	2	2	33
2007–08	Colorado Avalanche	NHL	82	2	19	21	55	9	0	1	1	4
2008–09	Colorado Avalanche	NHL	81	1	9	10	26	—	—	—	—	—
2009–10	Colorado Avalanche	NHL	81	2	14	16	40	6	0	0	0	4
2010–11	Colorado Avalanche	NHL	23	0	6	6	6	—	—	—	—	—
2010–11	Washington Capitals	NHL	55	1	4	5	28	9	0	1	1	2
2011–12	Calgary Flames	NHL	78	2	10	12	38	—	—	—	—	—
2012–13	Nashville Predators	NHL	29	0	1	1	20	—	—	—	—	—
2012–13	San Jose Sharks	NHL	4	0	0	0	2	11	0	4	4	4
2013–14	San Jose Sharks	NHL	56	3	9	12	55	7	0	2	2	0
2014–15	San Jose Sharks	NHL	58	2	5	7	26	—	—	—	—	—
NHL totals			1,055	38	179	217	625	100	1	20	21	93

=== International ===
Medal record

Representing Canada

Men's ice Hockey

World Championships
Silver medal – second place	2005 Vienna	

World Cup
Gold medal – first place	2004 World Cup	

Year	Team	Event	Result	GP	G	A	Pts	PIM
2004	Canada	WCH	1st place, gold medalist(s)	5	0	1	1	4
2005	Canada	WC	2nd place, silver medalist(s)	9	0	0	0	8
Senior totals				14	0	1	1	12

== Awards and honours ==
Award	Year
WHL
West First All-Star Team	1998–99
NHL
NHL All-Star Game	2003–04

== Personal life ==
Hannan and wife Kristina married in 2008 and have two sons, Gage and Owen.

Awards and achievements
Preceded by Patrick Marleau	San Jose Sharks first-round draft pick 1997	Succeeded by Brad Stuart
