= Mark Smith (ice hockey) =

Canadian ice hockey player

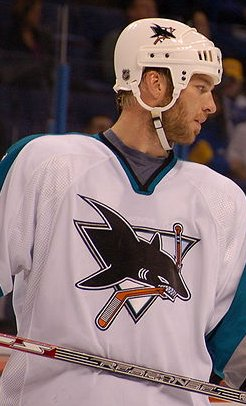
- Born: October 24, 1977 (age 48) Edmonton, Alberta, Canada
- Height: 5 ft 10 in (178 cm)
- Weight: 215 lb (98 kg; 15 st 5 lb)
- Position: Centre
- Shot: Left
- Played for: San Jose Sharks; Calgary Flames
- NHL draft: 219th overall, 1997; San Jose Sharks
- Playing career: 1998–2008

Mark Christopher Smith (born October 24, 1977) is a Canadian former professional ice hockey centre who played in the National Hockey League (NHL) with the San Jose Sharks and Calgary Flames.

== Playing career ==
Smith was selected by the San Jose Sharks in the ninth round, 219th overall, in the 1997 NHL entry draft.

On July 24, 2006, Smith was awarded a $700,000 one-year contract through arbitration. In September 2007, he was invited for a tryout at the New York Rangers training camp; however, after playing in 2 pre-season games with the club, he was released. Less than a week later, he was signed by the Flames.

His career was ended when he was crushed into the boards by Derek Boogaard and suffered neck injuries on March 22, 2008.

== Playing style ==
Smith was a fast skater with an energetic checking style and scrappy demeanour that sometimes resulted in fights. San Jose had utilized Smith as a penalty killer and powerplay specialist.

In the 2005–06 NHL season Smith displayed some of his offensive ability by setting a career high in regular season and playoff goals.

== Off the ice ==
Smith is the guitarist and lead singer for the Bay Area band, The Vinyl Trees, featured on Smith's own record label Lunar Records. He started Lunar Records during the 2004–05 NHL lockout. Smith, who has been playing guitar since age 16, adds color to his music with a variety of other instruments like the Didgeridoo, the Xylophone, and the Donkey Jaw. He is also known for his constantly changing hair styles.

Smith made his debut as a commentator for Comcast Sports Net Bay Area during the 2009 playoffs. He is a color commentator for select San Jose Sharks games. He and his wife ran a clothing store, Ayla, in downtown Campbell, California, now closed.

== Career statistics ==
=== Regular season and playoffs ===
			Regular season					Playoffs
Season	Team	League	GP	G	A	Pts	PIM	GP	G	A	Pts	PIM
1994–95	Lethbridge Hurricanes	WHL	49	3	4	7	25	—	—	—	—	—
1995–96	Lethbridge Hurricanes	WHL	71	11	24	35	59	4	2	0	2	2
1996–97	Lethbridge Hurricanes	WHL	62	19	38	57	125	19	7	13	20	51
1997–98	Lethbridge Hurricanes	WHL	70	42	67	109	206	3	0	2	2	18
1997–98	Kentucky Thoroughblades	AHL	—	—	—	—	—	2	0	0	0	0
1998–99	Kentucky Thoroughblades	AHL	78	18	21	39	101	12	2	7	9	16
1999–00	Kentucky Thoroughblades	AHL	79	21	45	66	153	9	0	5	5	22
2000–01	Kentucky Thoroughblades	AHL	6	2	6	8	23	—	—	—	—	—
2000–01	San Jose Sharks	NHL	42	2	2	4	51	—	—	—	—	—
2001–02	San Jose Sharks	NHL	49	3	3	6	72	—	—	—	—	—
2002–03	San Jose Sharks	NHL	75	4	11	15	64	—	—	—	—	—
2003–04	San Jose Sharks	NHL	36	1	3	4	72	10	1	0	1	11
2004–05	Victoria Salmon Kings	ECHL	20	6	9	15	41	—	—	—	—	—
2005–06	San Jose Sharks	NHL	80	9	15	24	97	8	3	0	3	2
2006–07	San Jose Sharks	NHL	41	3	10	13	42	3	0	0	0	4
2007–08	Calgary Flames	NHL	54	1	3	4	59	—	—	—	—	—
NHL totals			377	23	37	60	457	24	4	0	4	21

== Awards and achievements ==
- Named to the WHL East Second All-Star Team in 1998
