= Drew Remenda =

Canadian hockey coach and sports broadcaster

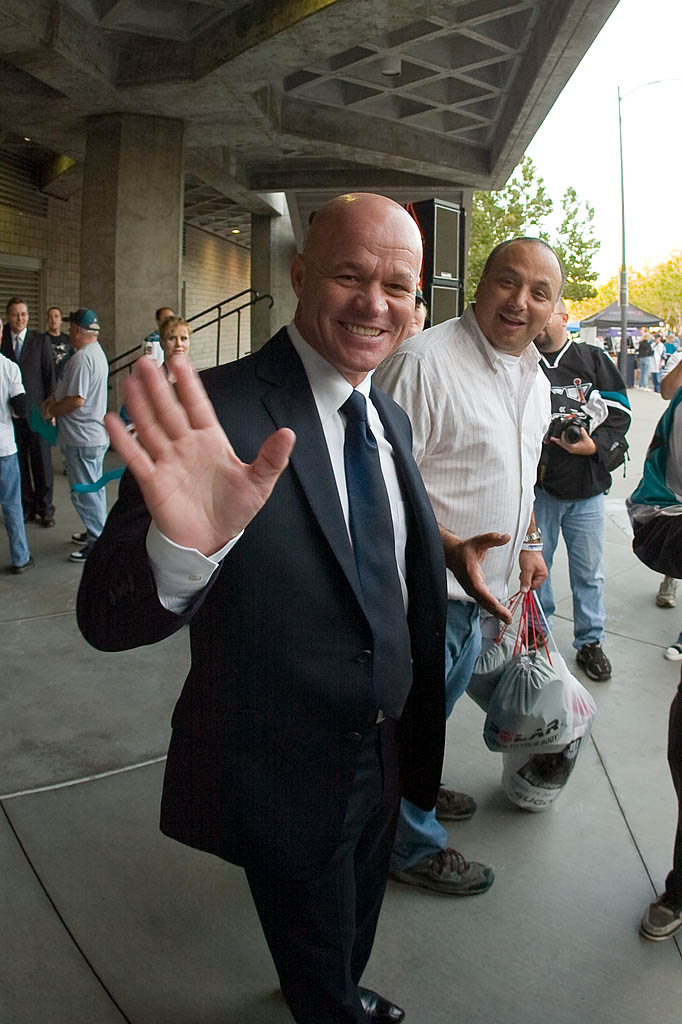
- Drew Remenda in 2007
- Born: April 13, 1962 (age 64); Saskatoon, Saskatchewan, Canada
- Occupation: Sportscaster
- Known for: Hockey coach Hockey broadcaster / analyst Radio broadcaster

Drew Remenda (born April 13, 1962) is a Canadian former hockey coach, radio broadcaster, and television hockey analyst. He currently is a radio and television broadcaster for the San Jose Sharks. He served as colour commentator for television broadcasts of San Jose Sharks games on NBC Sports California, as well as the co-host of The Green Zone with Jamie Nye and Drew Remenda for CKOM in Saskatoon. Remenda has also served as a commentator along with his broadcast partner Randy Hahn for the video games NHL 2K9 and NHL 2K10. Remenda worked the 2022 and 2026 Stanley Cup Playoffs for TNT.

== Coaching career ==
As a coach, Remenda got his start as a video coordinator for Hockey Canada in the 1980s, providing support for Canada's national team and the Canadian Amateur Hockey Association. He served as coach for the University of Calgary's hockey team for the 1989–90 season before being hired as an assistant coach for the San Jose Sharks expansion team. Remenda served as an assistant coach for the Sharks from 1991 to 1995, then spent a year as the head coach of the Sharks' minor league affiliate the Kansas City Blades.

== Broadcasting career ==
After his coaching career, Remenda was offered a job as a broadcast analyst for the Sharks. Remenda started on radio, calling games with long-time Sharks radio announcer Dan Rusanowsky. In 1999, Remenda moved up to the Sharks TV crew, joining announcer Randy Hahn in calling Sharks games. His broadcast work with the Sharks over the years earned Remenda three Northern California Emmy Awards in the "On Camera Sports" category in 1999, 2001 and 2006. Remenda also hosted Shark Byte, a 30-minute magazine-style show on CSN Bay Area dedicated to a behind-the-scenes look at the Sharks.

Remenda was also active in the Bay Area community during his first stint working with the Sharks organization. He was featured in the team's Reading Is Cool program, reading books to children and also starring alongside team mascot S.J. Sharkie in videos distributed to Bay Area schools.

On May 17, 2006, following the Sharks' ouster from the 2006 Stanley Cup Playoffs by the Edmonton Oilers, Remenda and Hahn tearfully wrapped up the telecast by announcing that Remenda would not return to the Sharks broadcast team in 2006–07. After leaving the Sharks, Remenda accepted a position with the CBC, where he was frequently the colour commentator alongside play-by-play announcer Don Wittman or Jim Hughson on broadcasts of Hockey Night in Canada. When broadcasting Sharks games for the CBC, Remenda frequently appeared on the local Sharks FSN Bay Area telecast with Hahn and Marty McSorley, Remenda's on-air replacement, between periods.

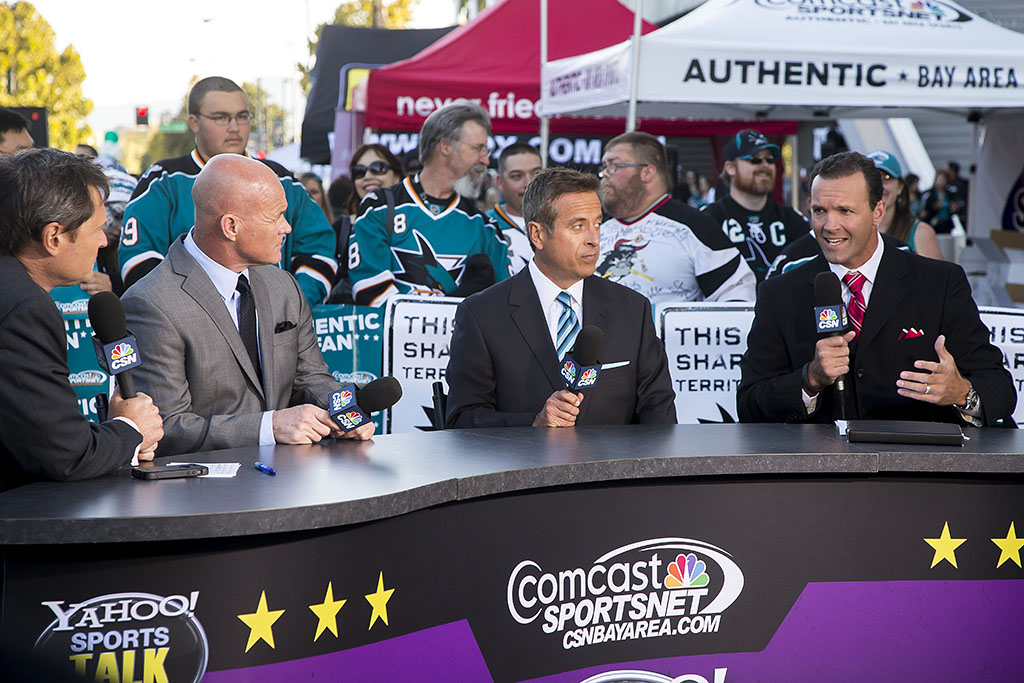
Remenda, Randy Hahn and Bret Hedican at the San Jose Sharks Opening Night Street Rally in 2013

Remenda teamed up with Hahn on FSN Bay Area (now NBC Sports California) again during Games 3 and 6 of the Sharks Western Conference semifinal matchup with the Detroit Red Wings when McSorley was unavailable for what the Sharks called "personal reasons." The San Jose Mercury News reported on July 3, 2007, that the Sharks had made an offer to Remenda in an effort to lure him back to the team's broadcast booth for the 2007–08 season. A month later, the San Jose Sharks reported on their web site that Remenda had agreed to return to the organization as the team's television colour analyst, replacing the departed McSorley.

Remenda also hosted The Drew Remenda Sports Show on News Talk 650 CKOM, a news/talk AM radio station in Saskatoon, Saskatchewan. The program also aired on News Talk 980 CJME, a news/talk AM radio station in Regina. In 2009, The Drew Remenda Sports Show was rebranded Sports Night with Jamie Nye and Drew Remenda. This change saw Drew co-anchor the show with Jamie Nye. In June 2012, Remenda "suddenly" disappeared from radio for unspecified reasons. The show was renamed "The Green Zone." Jamie Nye still hosts The Green Zone and Remenda will often appear as a guest on the show to talk about the NHL.

On June 17, 2014, it was reported that Remenda would not have his contract renewed as the Sharks colour analyst. He would later be hired as colour commentator for regional Edmonton Oilers broadcasts, replacing Louie DeBrusk before being replaced by DeBrusk in 2021.

In February 2021, Remenda returned to San Jose Sharks broadcasts as a pre and post game analyst. In October of the same year, his role expanded to colour analyst for radio and television broadcasts. On August 29, 2024, he became the lead TV color commentator for the Sharks.
