= List of Florida Panthers broadcasters =

In 1996, Florida Panthers owner Wayne Huizenga purchased a 70% controlling interest in SportsChannel Florida, with Rainbow Media (by that time, a joint venture between Cablevision and NBC) retaining a minority 30% interest. That led Huizenga to move the NHL franchise's game telecasts from Sunshine Network to SportsChannel Florida for the 1996–97 season.

In 2000, SportsChannel Florida was bought by Fox Sports Networks and was renamed to Fox Sports Net Florida. The channel was also known as FSN Florida and Fox Sports Florida.

On December 14, 2017, as part of a merger between both companies, The Walt Disney Company announced plans to acquire all 22 regional Fox Sports networks from 21st Century Fox, including Fox Sports Florida. However, on June 27, 2018, the Justice Department ordered their divestment under antitrust grounds, citing Disney's ownership of ESPN. On May 3, 2019, Sinclair Broadcast Group and Entertainment Studios (through their joint venture, Diamond Sports Group) bought Fox Sports Networks from The Walt Disney Company for $10.6 billion. The deal closed on August 22, 2019. On November 17, 2020, Sinclair announced an agreement with casino operator Bally's Corporation to serve as a new naming rights partner for the FSN channels. Sinclair announced the new Bally Sports branding for the channels on January 27, 2021.

On March 31, 2021, coinciding with the start of the 2021 Major League Baseball season the next day, Fox Sports Florida and sister network Fox Sports Sun rebranded as Bally Sports Florida and Bally Sports Sun, which resulted in 18 other Regional Sports Networks renamed Bally Sports in their respective regions. The first live sporting event on Bally Sports Florida will be the Marlins home opener against the Rays on April 1.

On March 14, 2023, Diamond Sports filed for Chapter 11 Bankruptcy.

In July 2024, amid Bally Sports' bankruptcy, the Panthers announced an agreement with the E.W. Scripps Company and its Scripps Sports division, under a multi-year deal beginning in the 2024–25 NHL season to air Panthers games. Scripps' Miami-Fort, Lauderdale station WSFL-TV 39 will serve as flagship station of the Panthers' television network. WHDT-TV 9 will air games in the Stuart-West Palm Beach market. WFTX-TV 36.3 will air games in the Fort Myers-Naples market. The Panthers will launch an in-market streaming service, Panthers+ to carry the games. The service costs $1.99 per game and $69.99 for the full season.

Outside of South Florida, the Panthers' games will be broadcast on ESPN+. Nationally, Panthers games may air on ABC, ESPN, ESPN+, and/or TNT as part of the NHL's national broadcast television rights agreement.

== Radio ==
Years	Play-by-play	Color commentators
1993–95	Chris Moore	John Moynihan
1995–96	Chris Moore	Alain Chevrier
1996–99	Chris Moore	Randy Moller
1999–04	Jiggs McDonald	Randy Moller
2005–07	Steve Goldstein	Randy Moller
2007–09	Randy Moller	Bill Lindsay
2009–15	Randy Moller	Vacant
2015–present	Doug Plagens	Bill Lindsay

=== Notes ===
- In 1993, Moynihan became the radio color commentator and pre- and post-game show host for the expansion Florida Panthers of the National Hockey League. His talk show was moved to 10 p.m. to 1 a.m to accommodate his Panthers duties. In June 1994, WQAM's vice president and general manager announced that Moynihan would not have his contract renewed.
- Moller has been the Panthers' television color analyst since 2015, following eight seasons as the team's radio play-by-play announcer and nine years as a radio analyst before that. He is known for screaming a pop culture reference after Florida Panther goals, though not every goal, and not when the Panthers are out of the game. Examples such as references to Tracy Morgan on 30 Rock, a Christian Bale tirade, film quotes from Wedding Crashers, Jaws, and Forrest Gump are included on a YouTube clip produced by The Dan Le Batard Show with Stugotz. The goal calls by Moller were done in conjunction with The Dan Le Batard Show, which shared the radio station that hosts the Florida Panthers radio play-by-play. The show and listeners provide Moller with numerous pop culture references, and he then chooses what he likes and uses it during games. He is also the president of the Panthers Alumni Association.
- McDonald filled in for Florida Panthers radio play-by-play man Randy Moller for three games when Moller became ill in January 2010.

== Television ==
Years	Play-by-play	Color commentators
1993–04	Jeff Rimer	Denis Potvin
2005–07	Dave Strader	Denis Potvin
2007–09	Steve Goldstein	Denis Potvin
2009–14	Steve Goldstein	Bill Lindsay
2014–19	Steve Goldstein	Denis Potvin; Randy Moller (rinkside)
2019–present	Steve Goldstein	Randy Moller

=== Notes ===
- Potvin was a color commentator for Florida Panthers television broadcasts on FS Florida from 1993, paired with play-by-play announcers Dave Strader and Steve Goldstein, for over 16 seasons before being replaced by former Panthers player Bill Lindsay in 2009.
- Strader called games for the Florida Panthers for the 2005–06 and 2006–07 seasons when not calling games for NBC or Versus.
- WPLG 10 serves as the local over-the-air broadcaster for Florida Panthers as part of the current NHL contract with ABC.
- TNT may also air Panther games as part of the NHL's broadcast television rights agreement.

== See also ==
- Historical NHL over-the-air television broadcasters
