= Historical NHL over-the-air television broadcasters =

US ice hockey broadcasters

The following is a list of historical National Hockey League over-the-air television broadcasters.

== Local ==
=== Current teams ===
- Anaheim Ducks — see list of Anaheim Ducks broadcasters
- Boston Bruins — see list of Boston Bruins broadcasters
- Buffalo Sabres — see list of Buffalo Sabres broadcasters
- Calgary Flames — see list of Calgary Flames broadcasters
- Carolina Hurricanes — see list of Carolina Hurricanes broadcasters
- Chicago Blackhawks — see list of Chicago Blackhawks broadcasters
- Colorado Avalanche — see list of Colorado Avalanche broadcasters
- Columbus Blue Jackets — see list of Columbus Blue Jackets broadcasters
- Dallas Stars — see list of Dallas Stars broadcasters
- Detroit Red Wings — see list of Detroit Red Wings broadcasters
- Edmonton Oilers — see list of Edmonton Oilers broadcasters
- Florida Panthers — see list of Florida Panthers broadcasters
- Los Angeles Kings — see list of Los Angeles Kings broadcasters
- Minnesota Wild — see list of Minnesota Wild broadcasters
- Montreal Canadiens — see list of Montreal Canadiens broadcasters
- Nashville Predators — see list of Nashville Predators broadcasters
- New Jersey Devils — see list of New Jersey Devils broadcasters
- New York Islanders — see list of New York Islanders broadcasters
- New York Rangers — see list of New York Rangers broadcasters
- Ottawa Senators — see list of Ottawa Senators broadcasters
- Philadelphia Flyers — see list of Philadelphia Flyers broadcasters
- Pittsburgh Penguins — see list of Pittsburgh Penguins broadcasters
- San Jose Sharks — see list of San Jose Sharks broadcasters
- Seattle Kraken — see list of Seattle Kraken broadcasters
- St. Louis Blues — see list of St. Louis Blues broadcasters
- Tampa Bay Lightning — see list of Tampa Bay Lightning broadcasters
- Toronto Maple Leafs — see list of Toronto Maple Leafs broadcasters
- Utah Mammoth — see list of Utah Mammoth broadcasters
- Vancouver Canucks — see list of Vancouver Canucks broadcasters
- Vegas Golden Knights — see list of Vegas Golden Knights broadcasters
- Washington Capitals — see list of Washington Capitals broadcasters
- Winnipeg Jets — see list of Winnipeg Jets broadcasters

=== Former teams ===
The following are teams that have since relocated or disbanded.

- Arizona Coyotes — see list of Arizona Coyotes broadcasters
- Atlanta Flames — see Atlanta Flames § Broadcasters
- Atlanta Thrashers — see Atlanta Thrashers § Media
- California Golden Seals — see California Golden Seals § Broadcasters
- Cleveland Barons (NHL) — see Cleveland Barons (NHL) § Broadcasters
- Colorado Rockies — see Colorado Rockies (NHL) § Broadcasters
- Minnesota North Stars — see Minnesota North Stars § Broadcasting
- Hartford Whalers — see list of Hartford Whalers broadcasters
- Kansas City Scouts — see Kansas City Scouts § Broadcasters
- Quebec Nordiques — see Quebec Nordiques § Broadcasters
- Winnipeg Jets (1972–1996) — see list of Winnipeg Jets broadcasters

=== See also ===
- List of current National Hockey League broadcasters
- List of Stanley Cup Finals broadcasters § Local television

== National ==
=== American ===
==== Free-to-air ====
- CBS
  - CBS Hockey Night (1956–57 to 1959–60)
  - Stanley Cup on CBS (1966–67)
  - NHL on CBS (1967–68 to 1971–72)
  - Super Series '76 on CBS (1976)
  - Challenge Cup on CBS (1979, Game 2 only)
  - Stanley Cup '80 on CBS (1980, Game 6 only)
- RKO General
  - Stanley Cup on RKO General (1966, Game 6 only)
  - NHL on RKO General (1966–67, regular season games only)
- NBC
  - Stanley Cup on NBC (1965–66)
  - NBC's Hockey Game of the Week (1972–73 to 1974–75)
  - NHL All-Star Game on NBC (1989–90 to 1993–94}
  - NHL on NBC (2005–06 to 2020–21)
- NHL Network
  - The NHL Game of the Week, NHL '78, NHL '79 (1975–1979)
- ABC
  - NHL on ABC (1992–93 to 1993–94, 1999–2000 to 2003–04)
  - NHL on ESPN (2021–22 to present)
- Fox
  - NHL on Fox (1994–95 to 1998–99)

==== Cable television ====
- Hughes
  - NHL '80 (1979–80, playoffs only)
- USA Network
  - NHL on Madison Square Garden Network (1979–80)
  - USA Network NHL (1980–81 to 1984–85)
- ESPN
  - ESPN Hockey (1979–80 to 1981–82)
  - ESPN Hockey Night in America (1985–86 to 1987–88)
  - ESPN National Hockey Night (1992–93 to 2003–04)
  - ESPN Sunday Night Hockey (1995–96 to 2000–01)
  - NHL on ESPN (2021–22 to present)
- ESPN2
  - espn2 fire on ice, ESPN2 National Hockey Night (1993–94 to 2003–04)
  - NHL on ESPN (2021–22 to present)
- SportsChannel America
  - NHL on SportsChannel America (1988–89 to 1991–92)
- NBCSN
  - NHL on OLN (2005–06)
  - NHL on Versus (2006–07 to 2010–11)
  - NHL on NBC Sports Network (2011–12 to 2020–21)
    - NBC Sports Stanley Cup Playoffs on CNBC (2011–12 to 2020–21)
    - NBC Sports Stanley Cup Playoffs on USA Network (2014–15 to 2020–21)
    - NBC Sports Stanley Cup Playoffs on Golf Channel (April 18, 2018)
- TNT, TNT, TruTV, HLN
  - NHL on TNT (2021–22 to present)

==== Internet Television ====
Network	Brand	Years
Peacock	NHL on NBC	2020–21
Hulu	NHL on ESPN	2021–22 to present
ESPN+	NHL on ESPN+	2021–22 to present
Disney+	NHL on ESPN	2021–22 to present
Max	NHL on TNT	2021–22 to present

=== Canadian ===
==== Free-to-air ====
Network	Brand	Years
CBC	Hockey Night in Canada	1952–53 to present (future in NHL TBD)
SRC	La Soirée du Hockey	1952–53 to 2001–02
CTV	CTV Hockey Night	1965–66 to 1974–75
CTV	CTV's Friday Night Hockey	1984–85 to 1985–86
Global/Canwest	Stanley Cup '87 (1987); Stanley Cup '88 (1988)	1986–87 to 1987–88 (playoffs only)
TVA	LNH à TVA	2014–present
Citytv	Hockey Night in Canada (2014–2026); Hometown Hockey (2014–2015)	2014–present

==== Cable television ====
Network	Brand	Years
TSN	The NHL Tonight on TSN	1987–88 to 1997–98
Sportsnet	Tuesday Night Hockey (1998–2001); NHL Gamenight (2001–2002)	1998–99 to 2001-02
TSN	NHL on TSN; Wednesday Night Hockey	2002-03 to 2013-14
RDS	LNH à RDS	2002–03 to 2013–14
RDS Info	LNH à RIS Info Sports (2005–2012); LNH à RDS Info (2012–2014)	2005–06 to 2013–14
Sportsnet	NHL on Sportsnet; Rogers Saturday Night Hockey (2026–Present); Sportsnet+ Monday Night Hockey (2026–Present); Hockey Night in Canada (2014–2026); Scotiabank Wednesday Night Hockey (2014–2026); Rogers Monday Night Hockey (2022–2024); Rogers Hometown Hockey (2015–2021)	2014–present
FX	Hockey Night in Canada	2014-15 to 2022-23
Omni Television	Hockey Night in Canada	2014-15 to 2025-26
TVA Sports	LNH à TVA Sports	2014–present

==== Internet television ====
Network	Brand	Years
Prime Video	Monday Night Hockey on Prime Video (2024–2026); Wednesday Night Hockey on Prime Video (2026–present)	2024–25 to present

== See also ==
- Historical Major League Baseball over-the-air television broadcasters
- Historical NBA over-the-air television broadcasters
