= List of Winnipeg Jets broadcasters =

Bell Media holds regional television rights to the Winnipeg Jets, under a 10-year contract that began in the inaugural season (2011–12). Jets games not shown by the league's national broadcast partner, Rogers Media, are televised by The Sports Network (TSN) on its regional channel TSN3 for viewers in the Jets' home region, which includes Manitoba, Saskatchewan, Nunavut, the Northwest Territories (shared with the Calgary Flames and Edmonton Oilers outside of Manitoba), and parts of Northwestern Ontario (shared with the Toronto Maple Leafs). Viewers outside of the Jets' home region can view regional TSN3 broadcasts through a paid subscription for out-of-market games from the NHL or one of its broadcast partners.

== Radio ==
Radio broadcasts are carried by CJOB in Winnipeg and southern Manitoba.

=== Winnipeg Jets I ===
Years	Play-by-play	Colour commentators
1979–85	Ken Nicolson	Curt Keilback
1985–90	Ken Nicolson	Mike O'Hearn or Curt Keilback (when not on TV)
1990–91	Mike O'Hearn	Brian Griffiths
1991–94	Curt Keilback	Don Wittman
1994–96	Kelly Moore	Don Wittman

=== Winnipeg Jets II ===
Years	Play-by-play	Colour commentators
2011–14	Brian Munz or Dennis Beyak (when not on TV)	Shane Hnidy
2014–17	Paul Edmonds or Dennis Beyak (when not on TV)	Shane Hnidy or Brian Munz
2017–23	Paul Edmonds or Dennis Beyak (when not on TV)	Brian Munz
2023–present	Paul Edmonds	Mitchell Clinton

== Television ==
Dan Robertson serves as the play-by-play announcer for the Jets, calling games on TSN3. He is joined by Landon Ferraro, who provides the colour commentary, and rinkside reporter John Lu. TSN3 colour commentary duties were formerly handled by Shane Hnidy, who moved to AT&T SportsNet Rocky Mountain to cover the Vegas Golden Knights in 2017.

=== Winnipeg Jets I ===
Years	Play-by-play	Colour commentators
1979–80	Brian Swain	Pit Martin
1980–85	Brian Swain	Dave Richardson
1985–86	Curt Keilback	Bruce Hood
1986–91	Curt Keilback	Gary Green
1991–92	Peter Young	John Garrett
1992–94	Bruce Buchanan	Jim Peplinski
1994–96	Curt Keilback	John Garrett/Ted Irvine

=== Winnipeg Jets II ===
Years	Play-by-play	Colour commentators
2011–15	Dennis Beyak	Brian Engblom (primary); Mike Johnson (during Engblom's NHL on NBC assignments)
2014–17	Dennis Beyak	Shane Hnidy
2017–18	Dennis Beyak	Ray Ferraro (select games); Jamie McLennan (select games); Dave Poulin (select games)
2018–22	Dennis Beyak	Kevin Sawyer
2022–26	Dan Robertson	Kevin Sawyer
2026–	Dan Robertson	Landon Ferraro

== See also ==
- Historical NHL over-the-air television broadcasters
- Winnipeg Jets (1972–96)
  - List of Arizona Coyotes broadcasters
