= List of Minnesota Wild broadcasters =

In 2000, Midwest Sports Channel acquired the television rights to the Minnesota Wild, an NHL expansion team which began play that year; the deal was struck by Fox in May shortly before the lawsuit against Comcast was filed as part of its plans to start a Minnesota-based regional sports network. With the acquisition of the Wild broadcasts, MSC adopted FSN-branded graphics, with announcers frequently using the phrase "...live on MSC, Fox Sports Net style" during its game broadcasts.

== Radio ==
KFAN FM 100.3 is the official flagship home of the Minnesota Wild. Since the 2011-12 NHL season, KFAN has broadcast all Wild preseason, regular season and Stanley Cup Playoff games on the State of Hockey’s top-rated sports talk station. Bob Kurtz (play-by-play), Tom Reid (analyst) and Kevin Falness (studio host) capture all of the action and suspense. Coverage begins with a 15-minute pre-game show. Conflicting games are moved to KOOL 108 FM. Additional Wild-related programming on KFAN features the “Wild Weekly” show and “Wild Fanline,” which airs after select Wild games.

| Years | Play-by-play | Color commentators |
|---|---|---|
| 2000-02 | Bob Kurtz | Barry Buetel |
| 2002–19 | Bob Kurtz | Tom Reid |
| 2019–2021 | Bob Kurtz (home games and select away games); Paul Allen (select away games); Jim Erickson (select away games); Kevin Falness (select away games); Joe O'Donnell (select away games) | Tom Reid |
| 2021–present | Joe O'Donnell; Bob Kurtz (select games) | Tom Reid |

In 1979, Kurtz joined KMSP-TV, where he called Minnesota Twins games from 1979–1986 and Minnesota North Stars games from 1979–1984. He was also the North Stars play by play announcer on KXLI-TV during the 1987–88 NHL season. From 1988–1989, he was the sports director at KSTP radio, where he also called University of Minnesota hockey, football and basketball. Kurtz returned to Minnesota in 2000 when he was hired to become the first radio play by play announcer for the Minnesota Wild. He was reunited with Tom Reid, who he previously worked with while calling games for the North Stars as well as University of Minnesota and Michigan State hockey broadcasts.

After retiring as a player, Reid spent 12 years as color analyst for the North Stars. After the team's move to Dallas, Reid continued as an analyst for NCAA hockey. He and Bob Kurtz have been part of the radio broadcast team for the Minnesota Wild since the team's inaugural season in 2000.

== Television ==
| Years | Play-by-play | Color commentators |
|---|---|---|
| 2000–02 | Mike Goldberg | Tom Reid |
| 2002–03 | Mike Goldberg | Mike Greenlay |
| 2003–04 | Matt McConnell | Mike Greenlay |
| 2005–12 | Dan Terhaar | Mike Greenlay |
| 2012–19 | Anthony LaPanta | Mike Greenlay |
| 2019–present | Anthony LaPanta | Mike Greenlay (select games); Wes Walz (select games); Ryan Carter (select games); Lou Nanne (select games); Krissy Wendell (select games); Gigi Marvin (select games) |

=== Current on-air staff ===
- Anthony LaPanta – play-by-play announcer
- Ryan Carter – lead analyst
- Alex Stalock - color commentator (select games)
- Lou Nanne – color commentator (select games)
- Wes Walz – studio analyst
- Katie Storm - studio analyst
- Kevin Gorg - studio host/rinkside reporter

== See also ==
- Minnesota_North_Stars#Broadcasting - The initial National Hockey League franchise in the state of Minnesota from 1967-93.
