= List of Dallas Stars broadcasters =

All Dallas Stars games are broadcast on radio on KTCK and KTCK-FM (1310 AM and 96.7 FM) under a five-year deal announced in January 2009. KTCK replaced WBAP 820 AM, which had broadcast games since the beginning of the 1994 season after KLIF has broadcast the first season in Dallas in 1993. Most games stream live on Amazon Prime Video. Until September 3, 2026, most Dallas Stars games were streaming on Victory+, and before that, television coverage occurred primarily on Bally Sports Southwest (BSSW), with KTXA (Channel 21) or BSSW+ broadcasting games when BSSW has a conflict.

The Stars, along with the Buffalo Sabres and Carolina Hurricanes are one of only three NHL teams to simulcast the entirety of their games on TV and radio, which the team has done since their 1993 arrival in Dallas. The original broadcast team from 1993 to 1996 was Mike Fornes (play-by-play) and Ralph Strangis (color). Fornes left the broadcast team after the 1995–96 season; Strangis moved to the play-by-play role and color commentator Daryl "Razor" Reaugh was added. Although both the DFW-area's large media market and the team's fan base could theoretically support separate television and radio broadcast teams, the Stars have continued simulcasting due to the popularity of "Ralph and Razor" (as they are known) among local listeners and viewers. Like other NHL teams, the Stars now have a live radio broadcast transmitted inside American Airlines Center on 97.5 FM. This is done because AM radio signals often cannot penetrate concrete and steel building exteriors.

Strangis retired from the booth after the 2014–15 season and was replaced by Dave Strader. In June 2016, Strader was diagnosed with cholangiocarcinoma, a fairly rare and aggressive form of cancer of the bile duct. To begin the 2016–17 season, Reaugh assumed play-by-play duties while Strader underwent treatment. Studio analyst and former Stars defenseman, Craig Ludwig, took over as color commentator. During a break in Strader's treatment, he returned to the broadcast booth on February 18, 2017, a 4–3 overtime home win against the Tampa Bay Lightning. After the game, the Stars saluted Strader at center ice. On October 1, 2017, Strader died of cancer at age 62, leaving Reaugh and Ludwig to call the 2017–18 season. In July 2018, the Stars announced that Reaugh would return to color commentary for the 2018–19 season, with former studio host Josh Bogorad taking over the play-by-play.

== Radio ==
For many years, WBAP was the flagship station for Dallas Stars hockey team, but relinquished the rights beginning in the 2009-2010 season. On January 16, 2009, the Dallas Stars named KTCK Sportsradio 1310 The Ticket as its new flagship station for the next 5 years. Ironically, with Cumulus Media's acquisition of Citadel Broadcasting, WBAP and KTCK are sister stations.

Also as previously mentioned, on January 16, 2009, The Ticket along with the Dallas Stars issued a press release naming KTCK as the new flagship station for Dallas Stars hockey for five years starting with the 2009-10 season. In 2014, this was renewed for an additional five years.

| Years | Play-by-play | Color commentators |
|---|---|---|
| 1993–96 | Mike Fornes | Ralph Strangis |
| 1996–15 | Ralph Strangis | Daryl Reaugh |
| 2015–16 | Dave Strader | Daryl Reaugh |
| 2016–17 | Dave Strader (5 game home-stand); Daryl Reaugh (during Strader's treatment) | Daryl Reaugh (5 game home-stand); Craig Ludwig (when Reaugh does play-by-play) |
| 2017–18 | Daryl Reaugh | Craig Ludwig |
| 2018–present | Josh Bogorad | Daryl Reaugh |
| 2022–present | Octavio Sequera (Spanish) | Pedro Silva (Spanish) |

Although Strangis had a great deal of broadcast experience, his tryout as color commentator on the Minnesota North Stars radio network was a longshot; other better-known sportscasters received more air time during the auditioning process. The five potential candidates split up a game as guest commentators alongside Al Shaver, then voice of the Minnesota North Stars. The two better-known talents each took a period and then the three longshots split up the third, with Strangis going last. When Al Shaver was asked who he liked the best, he chose Strangis. Ralph shone in his audition, with the perfect ability to complement Shaver's play-by-play with insights from the players and his own intimate knowledge of the game. When the Stars moved to Dallas in 1993, Shaver decided not to migrate south with the franchise and retired. After three more seasons as color commentator (teaming with Mike Fornes), Strangis migrated to the play-by-play mic, effectively cementing his status as the "Voice of the Stars."

In 1996, former NHL goalie Daryl "Razor" Reaugh joined Strangis as the Stars' color commentator, thus creating the popular duo "Ralph and Razor". The two achieved a near cult-like following in the city of Dallas, so much so that, even though fan support and Dallas' media market size could easily support separate radio and television broadcast teams, the Stars elected to continue simulcasting the pair. In 2008, the Stars added in-arena radio (on 97.5FM) allowing fans yet another opportunity to hear the popular team.

In a poll conducted by the Dallas Morning News, his most famous line was voted the most memorable moment in Dallas history. "Hull scores! Yes! Yes! Yes! The Stars win the Stanley Cup, the Stars win the Stanley Cup!"

As previously mentioned, in June 2016, Strader was diagnosed with cholangiocarcinoma, a fairly rare and aggressive form of cancer of the bile duct. During a break in his treatment, he returned to the broadcast booth on February 18, 2017, a 4-3 overtime home win against the Tampa Bay Lightning. After the game, the Stars saluted Strader at center ice.

Strader broadcast all five games of that Dallas home stand including one on NBC. In April 2017, he also broadcast games in the first round Stanley Cup playoff series between the Washington Capitals and Toronto Maple Leafs on NBC networks.

Since March 2, 2022, Spanish-language sports TUDN Radio affiliate KFLC (1270 AM) aired Dallas Stars hockey games in Spanish as part of the hockey team's annual celebration of Noche Mexicana (now Hispanic Heritage Night). Veteran Spanish broadcaster Octavio Sequera handled the play-by-play duties and Pedro Silva (from TV station KUVN-DT channel 23) served as the color analyst. In 2022, they've aired a game vs. the Los Angeles Kings and in 2023 vs. the Arizona Coyotes. The annual games have moved to Latin Pop-formatted stations KDXX (107.9) and KESS-FM (107.1) within TelevisaUnivision's portfolio since KFLC's sale to Latino Media Network.

== Television ==
For many years, the Dallas Stars television broadcasts were primarily on regional sports network Bally Sports Southwest (formerly Fox Sports Southwest until 2021, Prime Sports Southwest until 1996 and Home Sports Entertainment until 1995). The separation of broadcast zones for BSSW was mostly due to the defined broadcast territories set by the National Basketball Association for four of the region's five NBA franchises – the Dallas Mavericks, Oklahoma City Thunder, San Antonio Spurs and New Orleans Pelicans (the Houston Rockets are carried on AT&T SportsNet Southwest – now Space City Home Network). In the event of a scheduling conflict between either of the teams (such as Mavericks/Thunder, Mavericks/Spurs, Thunder/Spurs, and sometimes Mavericks/Spurs/Thunder), the games will be shown on their own subfeeds (Thunder on Fox Sports Oklahoma, Spurs or Mavericks on Bally Sports Southwest). In certain circumstances, games involving the Dallas Stars (the only National Hockey League team based in Texas) aired on Bally Sports Southwest beyond the Dallas-Fort Worth designated market area, including the Houston market, which no longer receives any NBA broadcasts over Bally Sports Southwest.

With the termination of its contract with Bally Sports Southwest on July 3, 2024, the Stars subsequently announced that it would partner with A Parent Media Co. to stream all of its games for free via the team-run streaming service Victory+ beginning in the 2024–25 season.

As of September 3, 2026, the Dallas Stars have moved their regional game broadcasts to Amazon Prime Video after the collapse of Victory+.

Over-the-air, the Stars aired on KTVT 11 and KTXH 20 (Houston) in 1993–94, KTXA 21 from 1994–99, and KDFI 27 in 2000.

| Years | Play-by-play | Color commentators |
|---|---|---|
| 1993–96 | Mike Fornes | Ralph Strangis |
| 1996–15 | Ralph Strangis | Daryl Reaugh |
| 2015–16 | Dave Strader | Daryl Reaugh |
| 2016–17 | Dave Strader (5 game home-stand); Daryl Reaugh (during Strader's treatment) | Daryl Reaugh (5 game home-stand); Craig Ludwig (when Reaugh does play-by-play) |
| 2017–18 | Daryl Reaugh | Craig Ludwig |
| 2018–present | Josh Bogorad | Daryl Reaugh |

In 1996, Reaugh joined Stars' play-by-play announcer Ralph Strangis to form the highly popular "Ralph and Razor" duo. The two have created a cult-like following in the area, so much so that, even though the media market and fan base could easily support separate radio and television broadcast teams, the Stars have elected to continue simulcasting the duo (the Stars even added in-arena radio of the duo). In August 2012, Ralph and Razor were ranked the #1 broadcasting duo in the NHL by hockeybuzz.com.

Starting with the 2011–12 NHL season, Reaugh began to broadcast Western Conference games on Hockey Night in Canada in addition to his role as the Dallas Stars color commentator.

As the Stars' color commentator he is well known for his incredibly deep vocabulary of descriptive words that he uses with almost comedic timing. His most frequent is "larceny", used when a goalie makes a spectacular save. He has used the "kick save and a beauty" line that Marv Albert coined, but his style of delivery nearly combines "kick" and "save" in a quick delivery with the rest of the quote at a more pronounced tempo. His newest favorite includes " SPIN-O-RAMA". He also credits goalies that catch with their right hand as "silly-siders". Additionally, he frequently provides witty phrases and thoughts that he calls "mind vitamins" during broadcasts and on his blog at the official Dallas Stars website. A popular example of one such "mind vitamin" is, "The early bird may get the worm, but it's the second mouse that gets the cheese."

After the 2014-15 season, Strangis decided to leave the Stars and was replaced by Dave Strader. The following summer, Strader was diagnosed with cancer and would miss significant time to undergo treatment. The Stars decided to have Reaugh become the permanent play-by-play announcer when Strader died on October 1, 2017. When he was the play-by-play announcer, Reaugh was joined in the booth by former Stars defensemen Craig Ludwig. On July 30, 2018, Reaugh returned as a color commentator role. He teams up with play-by-play Josh Bogorad.

== See also ==
- Historical NHL over-the-air television broadcasters
- Minnesota North Stars § Broadcasting
