= List of Ottawa Senators broadcasters =

Ottawa Senators games are broadcast locally in both the English and French languages. As of the 2014–15 season, regional television rights to the Senators' regular season games not broadcast nationally by Sportsnet, TVA Sports, or Hockey Night in Canada are owned by Bell Media under a 12-year contract, with games airing in English on TSN5, and in French on RDS, RDS 2 and/or RDS INFO. Regional broadcasts are available within the team's designated region (shared with the Montreal Canadiens), which includes the Ottawa River valley, Eastern Ontario (portions are shared with the Toronto Maple Leafs), along with Quebec, the Maritime provinces and Newfoundland and Labrador.

== Television ==
Sportsnet East held English regional rights to the Sens prior to the 2014–15 season. In April 2014, Dean Brown, who had called play-by-play for Senators games since the team's inception, stated that it was "extremely unlikely" that he would move to TSN and continue his role. He noted that the network already had four commentators among its personalities – including Gord Miller, Chris Cuthbert, Rod Black, and Paul Romanuk (who was, however, picked up by Rogers for its national NHL coverage in June 2014), who were likely candidates to serve as the new voices of the Senators. Brown ultimately moved to the Senators' radio broadcasts alongside Gord Wilson.

During the 2006–07 and 2007–08 seasons, several games were only available in video on pay-per-view or at local movie theatres in the Ottawa area. The "Sens TV" service was suspended indefinitely as of September 24, 2008. In 2010, Sportsnet launched a secondary channel for selected Senators games as part of its Sportsnet One service. Selected broadcasts of Senators games in the French language were broadcast by RDS and TVA Sports. On the RDS network, Félix Séguin and former Senators goaltender Patrick Lalime were the announcers from the 2011–12 season to the 2013–14 season, and Michel Y. Lacroix and Norman Flynn starting in the 2014–15 season. The TVA Sports broadcast team consisted of Michel Langevin, Yvon Pedneault and Enrico Ciccone.

Years	Play-by-play	Color commentators
1992–96	Don Chevrier	Greg Millen
1996–98, 2001–04	Dean Brown	Greg Millen
1998–2001	Rob Faulds	Greg Millen
2005–09	Dean Brown	Garry Galley
2005–09	Dean Brown	Gord Wilson (PPV)
2009–10	Dean Brown	Shaun Van Allen
2009–10	Dean Brown	Gord Wilson (PPV)
2011–14	Dean Brown	Denis Potvin
2014–2020	Gord Miller (select games); Chris Cuthbert (select games)	Ray Ferraro (select games); Jamie McLennan (select games); Mike Johnson (select games)
2020–present	Gord Miller (primary); Jon Abbott (select games); Dustin Nielson (select games)	Jamie McLennan (primary); Mike Johnson (select games); Dave Poulin (select games)

=== Notes ===
- CHRO-TV broadcast 20 regular-season games a year usually, but not always, on Thursday evenings - with Dean Brown as play-by-play announcer and Gord Wilson as commentator. Games were broadcast through the 2007-08 season, after which games were moved back exclusively to Sportsnet East, and later TSN5 (also owned by CHRO parent company Bell Media).
- Breakaway was not affiliated with a similar pay-per-view package of Ottawa Senators games, branded as "Sens TV", which was offered over roughly the same timeframe. Instead, the Senators distributed these games through the main incumbent PPV provider serving each cable or satellite provider (namely Viewers Choice, Vu!, or Shaw PPV). It too was discontinued in favor of a deal with Sportsnet One in 2010.

== Radio ==
On radio, all home and away games are broadcast on a five-station network stretching across Eastern Ontario, and including one American station, WQTK in Ogdensburg, New York. The flagship radio station is CFGO "TSN Radio 1200" in Ottawa. Radio broadcasts on CFGO began in 1997–98 (at first the Senators were on Ottawa's talk-radio station 580 CFRA); the contract has since been extended through the 2025–2026 as part of Bell Media's rights deal with the team. The Senators are broadcast on radio in French through Intersport Production and CJFO Unique FM in Ottawa. Nicolas St. Pierre provides play-by-play, with Alain Sanscartier as colour commentator.

Years	Play-by-play	Color commentators
1992–present	Dean Brown	Gord Wilson

=== Notes ===
- Dave Schreiber did back up play-by-play for when Brown was on TV (1992-09). Shaun Van Allen did back up colour commentary for when Wilson was on PPV TV (2005-08).

== See also ==
- Historical NHL over-the-air television broadcasters
