= List of Columbus Blue Jackets broadcasters =

This is a list of broadcasters for the Columbus Blue Jackets ice hockey team.

== Television ==
On Blue Jackets Hockey Network, Steve Mears serves as the television play-by-play announcer alongside former Blue Jacket Jody Shelley providing color analysis. Mears was named the play-by-play announcer prior to the 2024–25 season, following the retirement of Jeff Rimer. Shelley was named the color commentator in the 2014–15 season, replacing previous analyst Bill Davidge.

Davidge became co-host of Blue Jackets Live, the televised pre-game, intermission and post-game shows, with Brian Giesenschlag until his retirement at the conclusion of the 2018–19 season. Beginning with the 2019–20 season, Giesenschlag's co-host is former Blue Jacket Jean-Luc Grand-Pierre. In-game reporting is provided by Dave Maetzold.

Years	Play-by-play	Color commentators
2000–04	Dan P. Kelly	Steve Konroyd
2005–06	Jeff Rimer	Brian Engblom
2006–09	Jeff Rimer	Danny Gare
2009–13	Jeff Rimer	Bill Davidge
2013–14	Jeff Rimer	Bill Davidge; Jody Shelley (select games)
2014–24	Jeff Rimer	Jody Shelley
2024–present	Steve Mears	Jody Shelley; John Davidson (select games)

* Note: John Davidson called select 2024-25 and 2025-26 games alongside Steve Mears due to conflicts with Jody Shelley's Monday Night Hockey schedule.

== Radio ==
On radio stations WBNS-FM (flagship), WBNS, and 34 other affiliates in Ohio and West Virginia, Bob McElligott provides play-by-play coverage. McElligott joined the Blue Jackets radio broadcast in July 2009 as a color commentator and became the play-by-play announcer for the 2013–14 season, taking over for George Matthews who had been calling Blue Jackets games since the team's inception in 2000. McElligott, along with Ryan Mitchell, hosts the pre-game and post-game radio shows. Fans can interact by e-mail and Twitter with McElligott and Mitchell during and after the game.

Years	Play-by-play	Color commentators
2000–09	George Matthews	Bill Davidge
2009–13	George Matthews	Bob McElligott
2013–14	Bob McElligott	Jody Shelley (select games)
2013–present	Bob McElligott	—N/a

=== Notes ===
- George Matthews held the position of the Blue Jackets' original radio play-by-play announcer from the team's inaugural season through the 2012–13 season.

== See also ==
- Historical NHL over-the-air television broadcasters
- Cleveland Barons (NHL)#Broadcasters – The very first National Hockey League franchise to be based out of the state of Ohio from 1976 to 1978.
