= Allison Williams (reporter) =

American sportscaster

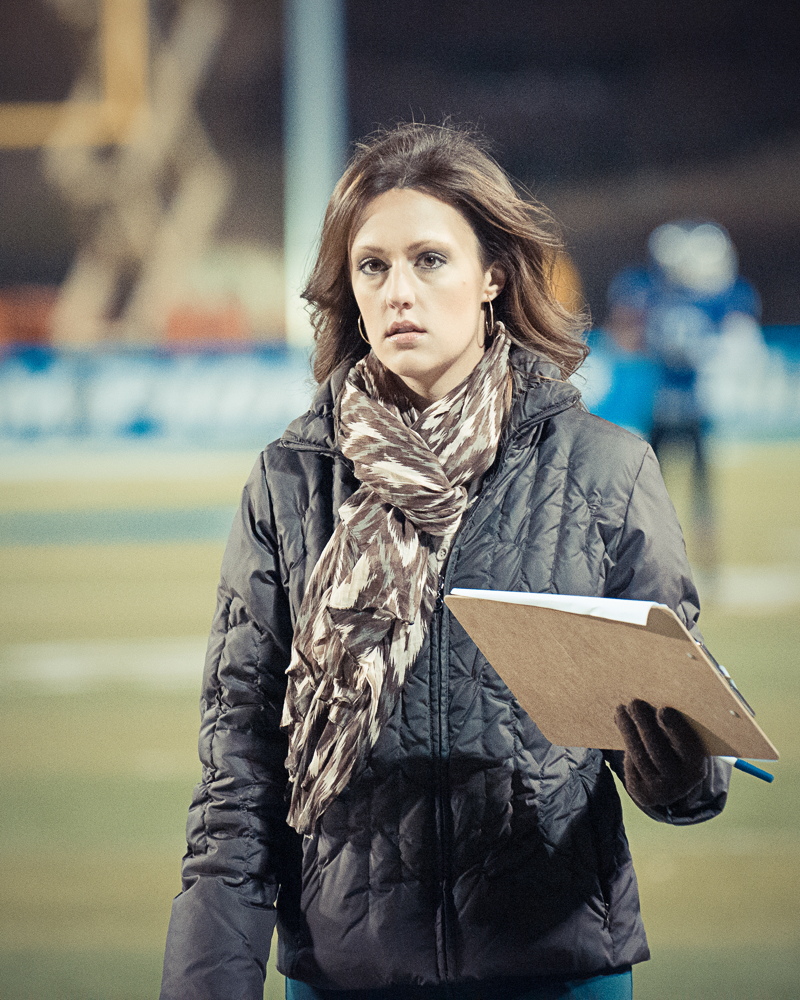
- Williams at Salem Football Stadium in December 2012
- Born: January 18, 1984 (age 42)
- Education: University of Miami
- Occupation: Fox Sports sideline reporter
- Years active: 2006–present

Allison Williams (born January 18, 1984) is an American sportscaster with Fox Sports. She previously worked for ESPN and as a host for select pregame/postgame shows for Marlins Live. She did Marlins field reporting with play-by-play man Rich Waltz and color commentator Tommy Hutton.

== Broadcasting career ==
Williams worked for Marlins Live for the Miami Marlins as a sideline reporter and host for pregame and postgame shows. She previously also did reporting for the Florida Panthers on home games with play-by-play man Steve Goldstein, Color Analyst Bill Lindsay, and Sportscaster Frank Forte. In addition, Williams also did sideline reporting for telecasts on college football and basketball for ESPN. Williams has hosted shows such as Miccosukee Sports Rap, The Jason Taylor Celebrity Golf Special, Ultimate Fan Experience, and other shows.

In October 2021, Williams announced that she would depart from ESPN, citing a COVID-19 vaccination mandate and her decision not to get the vaccine due to IVF treatments for her second child. Shortly after, Williams announced that she would be joining The Daily Wire, providing sports content.

Williams returned to sideline reporting with Fox Sports in August 2022.

== Personal life ==
Williams grew up in Michigan and graduated from the University of Miami in 2006 with a degree in broadcast journalism.
