= Denis Potvin =

Canadian ice hockey player (born 1953)

- Hockey Hall of Fame, 1991
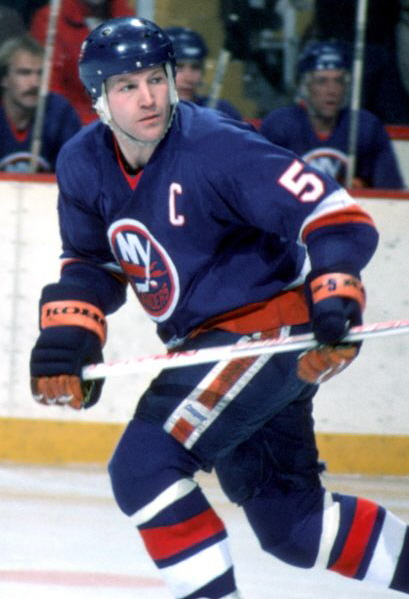
- Potvin with the New York Islanders in 1984
- Born: October 29, 1953 (age 72) Vanier, Ontario, Canada
- Height: 6 ft 0 in (183 cm)
- Weight: 205 lb (93 kg; 14 st 9 lb)
- Position: Defence
- Shot: Left
- Played for: New York Islanders
- National team: Canada
- NHL draft: 1st overall, 1973; New York Islanders
- Playing career: 1973–1988
Medal record
Representing Canada
Ice hockey
World Championships
Bronze medal – third place	1986 Moscow
Canada Cup
Gold medal – first place	1976 Canada

Denis Charles Potvin (born October 29, 1953) is a Canadian former professional ice hockey defenceman and team captain for the New York Islanders of the National Hockey League (NHL). In his youth, Potvin excelled for the Ottawa 67's for his play that saw him touted as the potential next Bobby Orr. Potvin was drafted as the first-overall pick by the Islanders in 1973. He would play all fifteen seasons in the NHL with the Islanders.

In his first season with the team, Potvin won the Calder Memorial Trophy for his rookie play, the first Islander to win a major award. In the 1977–78 season, he won the James Norris Memorial Trophy for his defensive play, an award he would win two further times in his career. He served as captain of the team from 1979 to 1987 and led the team to the Stanley Cup championship in four consecutive years from 1980 to 1983. A reliable presence for the Islanders in physicality and his slap shot, he passed Orr for most goals as a defenceman and became the first player in his position to score 300 goals in NHL history, doing so in his final season in 1988. In over 1,000 games as a player, he recorded 310 goals and 742 assists for a total of 1,052 points, with each category being the most for a defenceman in NHL history when he retired. In 1991, alongside his teammate, Mike Bossy, he was among the first Islanders to be inducted into the Hockey Hall of Fame. He was the first Islander to have his jersey retired by the team in February 1992. In 2017, he was named one of the 100 Greatest NHL Players in history.

After his playing career ended, he served as a commentator, starting with SportsChannel America from 1988 to 1993. He was the first color commentator for the Florida Panthers in 1993 until 2009. He became the commentator for television broadcasts of the Ottawa Senators on Sportsnet from 2010 to 2014 before he was re-hired by the Panthers, where he worked until he retired as a broadcaster in 2019.

== Early life ==
Potvin was born in Vanier, Ontario. He got interested in playing hockey from a young age, with older brother Jean bringing him to the Hull Arena for skating sessions in the summer. Potvin's father Armand came to an agreement with the junior hockey team Ottawa 67s. The young Potvin (age fifteen in 1968) was initially signed with the agreement to play home games with his older brother Jean (who would serve as his on-ice bodyguard) while spending the rest of his time studying at Rideau High School. However, a hazing incident left with him a shaved head and he hid from school at a pool hall until the school called the family. His father decided that if he wasn't going to go to school, he might as well put all of his effort in hockey. Potvin would play five seasons for the team and scored 329 points in 254 games and immediately saw high expectations thrust upon him. He noted in a 2022 interview about his first game with Ottawa:

My first game with the 67’s, we played against Niagara Falls. And the next day — just because I played my first game as a 14-year-old — the newspaper headline read, ‘The Next Bobby Orr. So I felt that expectation was there all the time. The media would always remind me. Yes, the pressure was there, I knew it.

When he finally was to turn 20 in 1973, the minimum age that a player could be drafted at the time in the NHL, he was selected by the New York Islanders.

== Playing career ==
Potvin was drafted first overall in the 1973 NHL Amateur Draft on May 15, 1973, by the struggling expansion New York Islanders. This team had recorded the worst record in modern NHL history the previous season. Right after Bill Torrey drafted Potvin, Montreal Canadiens general manager Sam Pollock made several offers to Torrey, hoping to trade for Potvin. Pollock's strategy was to offer a "quick-fix" package of veteran players to exchange for the top draft pick. Torrey ultimately turned down the offer since he felt Potvin would be a long-term asset to his team.

Upon joining the Islanders, Potvin wanted to wear number 7 on his uniform but was forced to take number 5, as forward Germain Gagnon was wearing number 7. Potvin entered the NHL with high expectations; some regarded him as the savior of the Islanders' franchise, and by others as potentially the next Bobby Orr. While he did not dominate the game in the same way as Orr, Potvin became an immediate star: He won the Calder Memorial Trophy as rookie of the year in 1973–74 and the James Norris Memorial Trophy as league's top defenceman in 1975–76 ending Orr's eight-year reign. At age 22, Potvin scored 31 goals and 98 points, the highest totals by a defenceman other than Orr. That year he finished second to Bobby Clarke in the voting for the Hart Memorial Trophy as the NHL's most valuable player.

Potvin was known for being intelligent, articulate, and outspoken off the ice. Throughout the 1970s, these traits often alienated his Islander teammates, as they made Potvin appear arrogant. He offended many hockey fans by stating publicly he had played better in the 1976 Canada Cup than Bobby Orr, and that Orr's selection as tournament MVP was for sentimental reasons. However, as Potvin matured, he became seen as a great leader as he learned to use these same qualities to positively affect his teammates.

Upon Orr's decline and retirement in the late 1970s, Potvin became widely acknowledged (along with Larry Robinson) as the premier defenceman in the game. He also won the Norris Trophy in 1977–78 and 1978–79. The latter was his best offensive season, when he scored 31 goals and 70 assists in only 73 games, becoming the second defenceman (Orr being the first) to score 100 points in a season. He had an impressive +71 plus-minus rating that season and finished fourth in the balloting for the Hart Trophy. Between 1974–75 and 1980–81, Potvin was named to the NHL's first all-star team five times and the second all-star team once; the only season he missed the all-star teams was 1979–80, when he was only able to play 31 games due to injury.

The 1978–79 season saw him record his first 100-point season. It was on February 25 that Potvin participated in a game that went down in lore for the Islanders-Rangers rivalry. The Islanders and Rangers were contending for playoff position when Potvin delivered a bodycheck (which he described as "a solid, shoulder-to-shoulder hit") on Rangers player Ulf Nilsson, who saw his right ankle buckle awkwardly as he laid on the ice in pain. It was later found that he had a fractured low end of his fibula and a torn deltoid ligament. While both Nilsson and Potvin blamed the ice (which had hosted a basketball game the previous day) for the injury, Rangers fans let Potvin know what they thought of him with boos for the rest of the night. It saw the talented but young Islanders finish first place in the overall standings and looking to challenge for the cup. They made it all the way to the semifinal round of the 1979 Stanley Cup playoffs before the Rangers upset the Islanders; the two teams would meet four times in the next five seasons and the Islanders would win each time, which only amplified what became known as the "Potvin sucks!" chant (decades later, Potvin would do a clothing line with a play on words called "Potvin Socks"). Clark Gillies stepped down as captain during the off-season and Potvin became the team's third captain, a position he held until relinquishing it in 1987. In the 1979–80 season, Potvin's first year as captain, the Islanders won their first of four Stanley Cups. Potvin was a key part of the Islanders during the team's early 1980s glory years: in addition to the four consecutive Stanley Cup championships and five straight finals appearances, in the eight seasons he served as captain, the Islanders never failed to reach the Stanley Cup playoffs. Potvin was very productive offensively in the playoffs, with his best year being the 1981 playoff run when he scored 8 goals and 17 assists for 25 points in 18 games. In the 1983–84 season, Potvin made a comeback of sorts, scoring 85 points and making the NHL's second all-star team.

Potvin was a more traditional defender than Orr and an extremely physical player. He averaged just under one point per game over his career (0.992), while Orr averaged 1.39 points per game. Late in his career, Potvin suffered a series of injuries that impeded his performance, leading to his retirement following the 1987–88 season. He retired as the NHL's leader in goals and points as a defenceman. His career totals were later surpassed by Ray Bourque, Paul Coffey, and others, and as of 2014, he sits fifth in career goals and seventh in career points amongst defencemen.

Potvin claimed to have received an offer from Mike Keenan to come out of retirement and play for the arch-rival New York Rangers in 1993. Keenan has yet to substantiate these claims. Potvin admitted that although he believed it was a joke, he did contemplate a comeback. After a brief skate, he decided his body could no longer handle the rigours of the game.

In 2023, he was named the 19th best player of the NHL modern era by the The Athletic.

== Broadcasting career ==
Potvin was a studio analyst for SportsChannel America television broadcasts from 1988–92, paired with host Bob Papa. Potvin was a color commentator for Florida Panthers television broadcasts from 1993, paired with play-by-play announcers Jeff Rimer, Dave Strader, and Steve Goldstein for over 16 seasons before being replaced by former Panthers player Bill Lindsay in 2009.

In September 2010, Potvin was hired as the Ottawa Senators' television colour commentator, working with Dean Brown on Rogers Sportsnet. In August 2014, he was rehired as colour commentator by the Florida Panthers, working with Steve Goldstein on Fox Sports Florida. As a colour commentator, he is known for his bizarre and inflammatory comments, such as claiming that Daniel and Henrik Sedin "...only use [their] fingers to lick the peanut butter off their bread". On July 29, 2019, he retired from broadcasting.

== Personal life ==
Potvin was born in Vanier, Ontario, but grew up in nearby Hull, Quebec. Potvin's brother, Jean Potvin, was also an NHL defenceman and the brothers were teammates for some years with the Islanders. Jean died in 2022. Both were cousins of former NHL player Marc Potvin, who died in 2006.

In 1983, Potvin's estranged wife accused him of repeatedly beating her while he was under the influence of alcohol and drugs. She cited this as a reason for the renegotiation of the financial terms of their divorce; the court rejected the renegotiation request. Of the proceedings, Potvin said, "It could have destroyed me, except that it was totally untrue, and the judge saw that." He subsequently remarried to Valerie Cates, a model.

== Career statistics ==
=== Regular season and playoffs ===
			Regular season					Playoffs
Season	Team	League	GP	G	A	Pts	PIM	GP	G	A	Pts	PIM
1968–69	Ottawa 67's	OHA-Jr.	46	12	25	37	83	—	—	—	—	—
1969–70	Ottawa 67's	OHA-Jr.	46	13	18	31	97	5	2	1	3	9
1970–71	Ottawa 67's	OHA-Jr.	57	20	58	78	200	11	4	6	10	26
1971–72	Ottawa 67's	OHA-Jr.	48	15	45	60	188	—	—	—	—	—
1972–73	Ottawa 67's	OHA-Jr.	61	35	88	123	232	9	6	10	16	22
1973–74	New York Islanders	NHL	77	17	37	54	175	—	—	—	—	—
1974–75	New York Islanders	NHL	79	21	55	76	105	17	5	9	14	30
1975–76	New York Islanders	NHL	78	31	67	98	100	13	5	14	19	32
1976–77	New York Islanders	NHL	80	25	55	80	103	12	6	4	10	20
1977–78	New York Islanders	NHL	80	30	64	94	81	7	2	2	4	6
1978–79	New York Islanders	NHL	73	31	70	101	58	10	4	7	11	8
1979–80	New York Islanders	NHL	31	8	33	41	44	21	6	13	19	24
1980–81	New York Islanders	NHL	74	20	56	76	104	18	8	17	25	16
1981–82	New York Islanders	NHL	60	24	37	61	83	19	5	16	21	30
1982–83	New York Islanders	NHL	69	12	54	66	60	20	8	12	20	22
1983–84	New York Islanders	NHL	78	22	63	85	87	20	1	5	6	28
1984–85	New York Islanders	NHL	77	17	51	68	96	10	3	2	5	10
1985–86	New York Islanders	NHL	74	21	38	59	78	3	0	1	1	0
1986–87	New York Islanders	NHL	58	12	30	42	70	10	2	2	4	21
1987–88	New York Islanders	NHL	72	19	32	51	112	5	1	4	5	6
NHL totals			1,060	310	742	1,052	1,356	185	56	108	164	253

=== International ===
Year	Team	Event	GP	G	A	Pts	PIM
1976	Canada	CC	7	1	8	9	16
1981	Canada	CC	7	2	5	7	12
1986	Canada	WC	7	1	4	5	6
Senior totals			21	4	17	21	34

== Career achievements, records and facts ==
- Retired having scored 310 goals and 742 assists for 1,052 points (at the time, the NHL career leader in all those categories for defensemen ) in 1,060 games, adding 1,356 penalty minutes.
- First NHL defenseman to reach 300 goals in regular season, and 1,000 career points.
- First player to reach 100 playoff assists in NHL history.
- Retired as the NHL career leader in playoff goals, assists, and points for defensemen.
- Led the 1976 Canada Cup tournament in assists (8), points (9), and penalty minutes (16).
- Won the James Norris Memorial Trophy as the NHL's best defenseman in 1976, 1978, and 1979.
- In 1991, he was inducted into the Hockey Hall of Fame and Ottawa Sports Hall of Fame.
- Most shorthanded assists in a single game (2)
- His jersey #5 was retired by the Islanders on February 1, 1992, the first such honor bestowed by the franchise.
- In 1998, he was ranked number 19 on The Hockey News' list of the 100 Greatest Hockey Players.
- In 2002, he was inducted into the Nassau County Sports Hall of Fame.
- One of only three players (Bryan Trottier and Josh Bailey being the others) to play 1,000 games in an Islanders uniform.

== See also ==
- Notable families in the NHL
- Captain (ice hockey)
- List of NHL players with 1,000 points
- List of NHL players with 1,000 games played

Preceded by Billy Harris	NHL first overall draft pick 1973	Succeeded by Greg Joly
Preceded by Billy Harris	New York Islanders first-round draft pick 1973	Succeeded by Clark Gillies
Preceded by Clark Gillies	New York Islanders captain 1979–87	Succeeded by Brent Sutter
Preceded by Bobby Orr	Winner of the Norris Trophy; 1976	Succeeded by Larry Robinson
Preceded by Larry Robinson	Winner of the Norris Trophy; 1978, 1979	Succeeded by Larry Robinson
Preceded by Steve Vickers	Winner of the Calder Memorial Trophy; 1974	Succeeded by Eric Vail
