= List of Detroit Red Wings broadcasters =

This is a list of broadcasters for the Detroit Red Wings ice hockey team.

== Historical overview ==
=== Radio history ===
WWJ did the radio broadcast for the Detroit Red Wings' opener in 1926-27 with Foster Hewitt on commentary.

Regular radio broadcasts for the Red Wings started in 1935–36, with Al Nagler doing home games through 1959–60. Gene Osborn did play-by-play on home games in 1960–61. In 1961–62, broadcasts moved to WJR for one year and all games were broadcast with Nagler and Budd Lynch splitting play-by-play duties. From 1962–64, Budd Lynch did play-by-play alone, but he was joined by Bruce Martyn in 1964–65. They split play-by-play through 1972-73. Then, Martyn did all of the play-by-play until he retired after 1994-95 and was replaced by Ken Kal.

Paul Woods has done radio color since 1987-88. Paul Chapman did it in 1986–87, succeeding Sid Abel, who had teamed with Martyn since 1976–77. Prior to that, Len Hardman did home games in 1972–73, Al Coates in 1973–74 and 1975–76, and Budd Lynch in 1974–75. On road games, Martyn either worked alone or found a local sportscaster to join him.

=== Television history ===
The Red Wings televised Sunday home games from 1949–50 through 1959-60; the first six years were simulcasts, Budd Lynch did TV only in the remaining years. The Red Wings returned to TV when channel 50 went on the air January 10, 1965, doing simulcasts through 1972–73. Budd Lynch and Larry Adderly did TV for the next two years. Simulcasts returned from 1975–76 through 1984–85.

During the late 1970s and early 1980s, the games were either on TV or radio, not both, because the same stations (WJR radio, WKBD-TV) had the Pistons' rights as well and that's how conflicts were handled.

By 1985–86, the Red Wings also were on the Pro-Am Sports System pay-TV channel, which broadcast about 20 games a year. Budd Lynch was involved with Alex Delvecchio on color. Also, they called Dave Strader up from the farm club, and he took over the play-by-play duties, calling TV games on both WKBD and PASS Sports alongside Mickey Redmond until 1996. Mike Goldberg did play-by-play in 1996–97 while Ken Daniels started working play-by-play in 1997–98.

In 2001, WJR lost its longtime flagship radio rights to the Detroit Tigers and Detroit Red Wings, both of whom moved to CBS-owned WXYT and WXYT-FM.

On December 12, 2006, Daniels broadcast a game between the Red Wings and the Ottawa Senators from ice-level between the benches, while color commentator Redmond remained in the booth. This was the first time a U.S. local station had attempted this type of broadcast. Daniels received a Michigan EMMY Award for this broadcast at the 29th Annual Michigan EMMY Awards on June 16, 2007, in Detroit.

On June 4, 2008, Daniels filled in for regular Detroit radio broadcast announcer Ken Kal for Game 6 of the 2008 Stanley Cup Finals between the Red Wings and the Pittsburgh Penguins. Kal was suffering from laryngitis and thus, was unable to call the game. The Red Wings had a 3–2 lead in the series and won the game and the cup. With 45 seconds left in the game, Daniels took off the headset and handed the game over to Kal, saying, "I don't care if you can't talk, you have to bring it home". Kal called the final 10 seconds, and was able to make the call "… The Detroit Red Wings are the 2008 Stanley Cup Champions!"

Larry Murphy was an alternate color commentator for the Detroit Red Wings on Fox Sports Detroit, doing so for Red Wings' west coast road trips in place of Mickey Redmond. From 2003 to 2006, he shared this duty with former teammate Pat Verbeek where they would alternate road trips. However following the 2005–06 NHL season, Verbeek left the job as a broadcaster to become a scout for the Red Wings and Murphy took over full-time on west coast road trips. In addition in 2006, Murphy started contributing as a studio analyst for games he does not provide color commentary. In the 2007–08 season, Murphy began serving as a "Between-the-Benches" reporter for Fox Sports Detroit when Mickey Redmond was broadcasting and subbed for Redmond when he had surgery to remove a tumor on his lung. He also made occasional appearances on the NHL Network's nightly hockey highlight show, NHL on the Fly. In March 2013, it was announced by Fox Sports Detroit that he had been fired, after being told they weren't satisfied with ratings. On February 14, 2019, it was announced Murphy would return as a studio analyst for the Red Wings on Fox Sports Detroit for the remainder of the 2018–19 season.

Years	Play-by-play	Color commentator(s)
1985–96	Dave Strader	Mickey Redmond
1996–97	Mike Goldberg	Mickey Redmond
1997–2003, 2013	Ken Daniels	Mickey Redmond
2003–06	Ken Daniels	Mickey Redmond (home games and select away games); Larry Murphy (select away games); Pat Verbeek (select away games)
2006–13	Ken Daniels	Mickey Redmond (home games and select away games); Larry Murphy (select away games)
2013–19	Ken Daniels	Mickey Redmond (home games and select away games); Chris Osgood (select away games); Darren Eliot (select away games)
2019–present	Ken Daniels	Mickey Redmond (home games and select away games); Chris Osgood (select away games); Larry Murphy (select away games)

=== Honored broadcasters ===
Four members of the Red Wings organization have received the Foster Hewitt Memorial Award:

- Budd Lynch: TV and radio play-by-play and color – 1949–1975 (awarded 1985)
- Bruce Martyn: Radio play-by-play – 1964–1995 (awarded 1991)
- Mickey Redmond: TV color commentary – 1979–1981, 1986–present (awarded 2011)
- Dave Strader: TV play-by-play – 1985–1996 (awarded 2017)

Lynch called the first locally televised game at Olympia for the original WWJ-TV in 1949. He remained with the organization for 63 years, serving as director of publicity from 1975 to 1982, and was the public address announcer from 1982 until his death in 2012. From 2008 to 2012, a second PA announcer was added to work alongside him, first John Fossen, then Erich Freiny. Freiny took over as the sole PA announcer following Lynch's death.

== Current broadcasters ==
The Red Wings' flagship radio stations are Detroit sister stations WXYT-AM 1270 and WXYT-FM 97.1. Games are carried on both stations unless there is a conflict with Detroit Tigers baseball. There are several affiliate stations throughout Michigan and Southwestern Ontario.

The Red Wings' exclusive local television rights are held by FanDuel Sports Network. The channel shared professional team coverage rights with some Detroit area broadcast television stations until the spring of 2008. In March 2008, the channel signed new long-term contracts with the Pistons, Red Wings and Tigers to broadcast more games than in previous years, becoming the exclusive local home of all three teams for the first time until at least 2018. This leaves only the NFL's Detroit Lions as the only local professional sports team in Detroit to have all of its games on broadcast television.

Announcers:

- Ken Daniels: Television play-by-play announcer.
- Mickey Redmond: Television color commentator (home games and select away games).
- Chris Osgood: Television color commentator (select away games that Redmond does not attend) and studio analyst (when not color commentator during play).
- Larry Murphy: Studio analyst and television color commentator (select away games that Redmond and Osgood do not attend).
- John Keating: Television pre-game and post-game show host.
- Ken Kal: Radio play-by-play announcer.
- Trevor Thompson, Mickey York: TV pre-game and post-game show hosts and reporters.
- Jeff Riger: Primary radio intermission and post-game host.

== See also ==
- Historical NHL over-the-air television broadcasters
