= List of Anaheim Ducks broadcasters =

This is a list of broadcasters for the Anaheim Ducks ice hockey team.

== Radio ==
In 2006–07, KLAA (AM) assumed the broadcast rights for the Anaheim Ducks, a National Hockey League team. That team went on to win the Stanley Cup in June 2007. In 2022, Ducks radio broadcasts moved to a dedicated stream on TuneIn.

Years	Play-by-play	Color commentators
1993–96	Matt McConnell	Charlie Simmer
1996–97	Brian Hamilton	Pat Conacher
1997–99	Brian Hamilton	Darren Eliot
1999–2001	Steve Carroll	Mike Greenlay
2001–04	Steve Carroll	
2005–09	Steve Carroll	Brent Severyn
2009–2023	Steve Carroll	Dan Wood
2023–2026	Steve Carroll	Emerson Etem
2026–present	Aaron Cooney	Emerson Etem

== Television ==
The current Ducks television homes are KCOP-TV (Channel 13), the local MyNetworkTV owned-and-operated station, and the Victory+ streaming platform.

Disney planned to start an ESPN West regional sports network for the 1998–99 season, which would also carry Anaheim Angels baseball games, but the plan was abandoned. The Ducks subsequently partnered with what were then called Fox Sports West and Prime Ticket, and later Bally Sports West and SoCal, as their cable telecast home until the end of the 2023–24 season. In the Los Angeles market, in the case of scheduling conflicts, the Fox Sports/Bally Sports networks would move a scheduled telecast of an Angels, Clippers, Ducks, or Kings game to KCOP-TV.

Years	Play-by-play	Color commentators
1993–2002	Chris Madsen	Brian Hayward
2002–present	John Ahlers	Brian Hayward

=== Current on-air staff ===
- John Ahlers – Anaheim Ducks play-by-play announcer
- Kent French — Angels Live and Ducks Live host
- Brian Hayward – Anaheim Ducks commentator and Duck Live analyst
- Guy Hebert — Ducks Live analyst
- Alyson Lozoff — rinkside reporter
