= List of Arizona Coyotes broadcasters =

This is a list of Arizona Coyotes broadcasters from the National Hockey League.

== Television ==
From the team's move to Phoenix in 1996 to the end of the 2006–07 season, the regional television rights for the Phoenix Coyotes were split between Fox Sports Arizona and over-the-air broadcasters including KTVK and KASW (channel 61, 1996–2006) and KAZT-TV (channel 7, 2006–2008).

From 2007–08 through 2022–23, Fox Sports Arizona (renamed Bally Sports Arizona in 2021) was the exclusive regional television rightsholder since 2008 for all non-national telecasts. For the final season in 2023–2024, the Coyotes moved to Scripps Sports, with games being broadcast on KNXV-TV 15.2. Partway through the season, co-owned KASW became the team's flagship station when it was relaunched as Arizona 61.

Scripps retained the rights to the team when it relocated to Salt Lake City and became the Utah Hockey Club (later Utah Mammoth). It had broadcast Coyotes games on KUPX-TV in Salt Lake City.

=== On-air staff ===
Arizona Coyotes television announcers
Years	Play-by-play	Color commentators
1996–02	Doug McLeod	Charlie Simmer
2002–04	Curt Keilback	Charlie Simmer
2005–07	Curt Keilback	Darren Pang
2007–09	Dave Strader	Darren Pang
2009–11	Dave Strader	Tyson Nash
2011–21	Matt McConnell	Tyson Nash
2021–24	Matt McConnell	Tyson Nash (primary); Lyndsey Fry (pre- and post-game); Paul Bissonnette (pre- and post-game)

The Coyotes' initial TV broadcast team consisted of Doug McLeod, former Pittsburgh Penguins, Minnesota North Stars, and Minnesota Golden Gophers announcer, and Charlie Simmer. Curt Keilback, who moved with the team from Winnipeg initially as its radio play-by-play voice, replaced McLeod in 2002 as part of a plan to simulcast radio and television. Simmer departed to pursue business interests in Calgary and was replaced as analyst by Darren Pang in 2005. In 2007, Dave Strader replaced Keilback, whose contract was not renewed, as the play-by-play announcer. With no television contract in place for Coyotes games, Pang left in 2009 to join the St. Louis Blues, and Strader was joined in the broadcast booth by former NHL player Tyson Nash. In July 2011, Strader left his position with the Coyotes to accept a full-time job with NBC/Versus. From 2011 until the team's relocation in 2024, Matt McConnell served as play-by-play announcer. McConnell followed the team to Salt Lake City.

== Radio ==
The Coyotes were heard on several Phoenix-area radio stations over their history. When they moved to Phoenix, their rights were won by KDUS (1060 AM) with 82 games, with 65 games simulcast on KDUS's sister, KDKB. Games were simulcast on KDKB through the 2005–06 season, and KDUS continued to hold the rights until 2008, when the team signed with KGME (910 AM). The Coyotes switched several times between KGME and the cluster of KTAR 620/KMVP (860 AM)/KMVP-FM 98.7, which broadcast other Phoenix professional sports teams. After airing on KMVP, the team switched to KGME in 2019, citing the fact that only 21 minutes a week was spent on the team in KMVP-FM's various local sports talk shows. The agreement lasted two years before the Coyotes opted to return to KMVP-FM. The two-year pact was extended by a third year for 2023–24.

=== On-air staff ===
Arizona Coyotes radio announcers
Years	Play-by-play	Color commentators
1996–97	Curt Keilback	Steve Konroyd
1997–98	Curt Keilback	Tom Kurvers
1998–02	Curt Keilback	Jim Johnson
2002–04	Curt Keilback	Charlie Simmer
2005–08	Bob Heethius	Louie DeBrusk
2008–14	Bob Heethius	Tyson Nash
2014–17	Bob Heethius	Nick Boynton
2017–20	Bob Heethius	Paul Bissonnette
2020–24	Bob Heethius	Lyndsey Fry

While Curt Keilback came to Winnipeg with the team, the Coyotes cycled through three color announcers in three seasons: Steve Konroyd; Tom Kurvers, who left to become a scout in the organization; and Jim Johnson. Johnson was dismissed in 2002 with the move to radio and television simulcasts. After the 2004–05 NHL lockout, the team reinstated separate play-by-play broadcasts, first with Bob Heethuis and former player Louie DeBrusk. When DeBrusk took an analyst position with Sportsnet in 2008, former Coyotes player Tyson Nash replaced him. Paul Bissonnette joined the radio booth in 2017; beginning in November 2018, he only provided analysis during home games only. Lyndsey Fry joined the radio booth in January 2021.
