= Daryl Reaugh =

Canadian ice hockey player (born 1965)

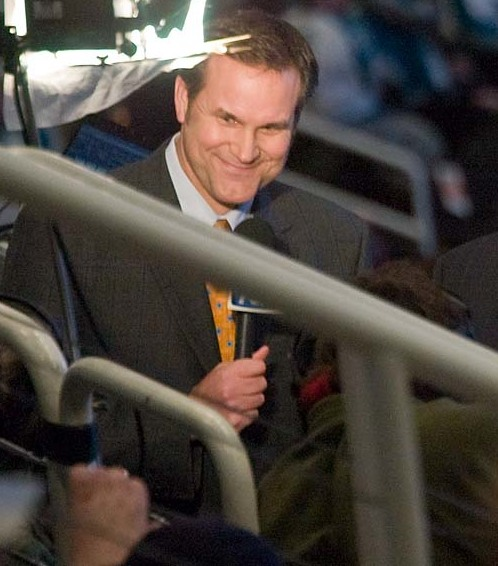
- Reaugh in 2007
- Born: February 13, 1965 (age 61) Prince George, British Columbia, Canada
- Height: 6 ft 4 in (193 cm)
- Weight: 200 lb (91 kg; 14 st 4 lb)
- Position: Goaltender
- Caught: Left
- Played for: Edmonton Oilers; Hartford Whalers
- NHL draft: 42nd overall, 1984; Edmonton Oilers
- Playing career: 1984–1993

Daryl Kevin "Razor" Reaugh (English: /ˈreɪ/ RAY; born February 13, 1965) is a retired professional ice hockey goaltender and now a broadcaster for the Dallas Stars of the National Hockey League (NHL). He played 27 games in the NHL for the Edmonton Oilers and Hartford Whalers between 1985 and 1991.

== Biography ==
=== Playing career ===
Reaugh played for the Kamloops Blazers of the Western Hockey League where he was an All-Star goaltender. In the 1984 NHL entry draft the Edmonton Oilers selected Reaugh with the 42nd pick. He played 7 games with the Oilers but spent the majority of his six years in the organization in the American Hockey League. He has a Stanley Cup ring and is included in the 1988 Edmonton Oilers team pictures. Reaugh dressed for 60 games, but since he only played 6 games, during the 1987-88 season, his name is not engraved on the Stanley Cup. Reaugh played in Finland's SM-liiga during the 1988–89 season.

Reaugh joined the Hartford Whalers in 1990 and played over 1000 minutes, posting a 7–7–1 record and a 3.15 goals against average. His season was cut short after an injury sustained in his 20th appearance. While playing a puck in net, a skate from one of the other players on the ice ran over Reaugh's glove, severely cutting his hand. A hamstring injury would make the 1993–94 season with the Dayton Bombers of the ECHL his last, cutting his promising career short at the age of 28.

=== Broadcasting career ===
Prior to his work with the Stars, Reaugh first appeared as a regular in 1991 on the American Hockey League-produced weekly series Rinkside, partnered with fellow goaltender Jim Ralph, and was also a colour commentator for the Hartford Whalers during the 1995–96 NHL season. Reaugh has also done work with ABC, ESPN, Fox, Versus, and NBC broadcasts of regular season and playoff NHL games, and provided the colour commentary in the EA Sports video games NHL '98 and NHL '99.

In 1996, Reaugh joined Stars' play-by-play announcer Ralph Strangis to form the highly popular "Ralph and Razor" duo. In August 2012, Ralph and Razor were ranked the #1 broadcasting duo in the NHL by hockeybuzz.com.

Starting with the 2011–12 NHL season, Reaugh began to broadcast Western Conference games on Hockey Night in Canada in addition to his role as the Dallas Stars color commentator.

After the 2014-15 season, Strangis left the Stars and was replaced by Dave Strader. The following summer, Strader was diagnosed with bile duct cancer and missed significant time to undergo treatment. The Stars decided to promote Reaugh as the permanent play-by-play announcer when Strader died on October 1, 2017, partnering with former Stars defenseman Craig Ludwig.

Starting with the 2018-19 season, Reaugh returned to the color commentary role, teaming up with play-by-play man Josh Bogorad (previously a host on the team's pregame, postgame, and intermission coverage). This change also coincided with the creation of "Podman Rush", a podcast hosted by Reaugh. The podcast features exclusive interviews and analysis, and is deemed the official podcast of the Dallas Stars.

As the Stars' color commentator, he is known for his deep vocabulary of descriptive words that he uses with almost comedic timing, known affectionately to some as "Razorisms". His most frequently-used words include "larceny", used when a goalie makes a spectacular save, "mastodonic", used to describe a play of huge significance during a game, and "nectarous", when he finds a piece of play to be particularly exciting or worthy of recognition.

Reaugh was awarded the Foster Hewitt Memorial Award for outstanding contributions to hockey broadcasting on November 10, 2025.

== Personal life ==
Reaugh spent a number of years growing up in Prince George, BC. He is also the brother-in-law of former NHL player Brendan Morrison (their wives are sisters). Reaugh also has two daughters.

== Career statistics ==
=== Regular season and playoffs ===
			Regular season									Playoffs
Season	Team	League	GP	W	L	T	MIN	GA	SO	GAA	SV%	GP	W	L	MIN	GA	SO	GAA	SV%
1981–82	Cowichan Valley Capitals	BCJHL	44	—	—	—	—	—	—	—	—	—	—	—	—	—	—	—	—
1982–83	Cowichan Valley Capitals	BCJHL	32	—	—	—	1673	191	0	5.96	—	—	—	—	—	—	—	—	—
1983–84	Kamloops Junior Oilers	WHL	55	34	10	0	2748	199	1	4.34	.864	17	14	3	972	57	0	3.52	—
1983–84	Kamloops Junior Oilers	M-Cup	—	—	—	—	—	—	—	—	—	4	1	2	190	19	0	6.00	—
1984–85	Kamloops Blazers	WHL	49	36	8	1	2749	170	2	3.71	.869	14	—	—	787	56	0	4.27	—
1984–85	Edmonton Oilers	NHL	1	0	1	0	60	5	0	5.04	.857	—	—	—	—	—	—	—	—
1985–86	Nova Scotia Oilers	AHL	38	15	18	4	2205	156	0	4.24	.869	—	—	—	—	—	—	—	—
1986–87	Nova Scotia Oilers	AHL	46	19	22	0	2637	163	1	3.71	.877	2	0	2	120	13	0	6.50	—
1987–88	Edmonton Oilers	NHL	6	1	1	0	175	14	0	4.79	.877	—	—	—	—	—	—	—	—
1987–88	Nova Scotia Oilers	AHL	8	2	5	0	443	33	0	4.47	.834	—	—	—	—	—	—	—	—
1987–88	Milwaukee Admirals	IHL	9	0	8	0	493	44	0	5.35	.861	—	—	—	—	—	—	—	—
1988–89	Cape Breton Oilers	AHL	13	3	10	0	778	72	0	5.55	.813	—	—	—	—	—	—	—	—
1988–89	Kärpät	Liiga	13	7	5	1	756	46	0	3.65	.886	—	—	—	—	—	—	—	—
1989–90	Binghamton Whalers	AHL	52	8	31	6	2375	192	0	4.21	.876	—	—	—	—	—	—	—	—
1990–91	Hartford Whalers	NHL	20	7	7	1	1023	53	1	3.15	.889	—	—	—	—	—	—	—	—
1990–91	Springfield Indians	AHL	16	7	6	3	912	55	0	3.62	.870	—	—	—	—	—	—	—	—
1991–92	Springfield Indians	AHL	22	3	12	2	1005	63	0	3.76	.883	1	0	0	39	1	0	1.54	.929
1992–93	Hershey Bears	AHL	1	0	0	0	22	1	0	2.73	.929	—	—	—	—	—	—	—	—
1993–94	Dayton Bombers	ECHL	4	1	3	0	160	17	0	6.38	.823	—	—	—	—	—	—	—	—
NHL totals			27	8	9	1	1246	72	1	3.47	.885	—	—	—	—	—	—	—	—

== Awards ==
- WHL West Second All-Star Team – 1984
- WHL West First All-Star Team – 1985
