= Anthony LaPanta =

American sports journalist

Anthony LaPanta is a sports personality with FanDuel Sports Network North.

== Biography ==
LaPanta is the host of Twins Live, a pregame/postgame show for the Minnesota Twins and the TV voice of the Minnesota Wild. He was hired by the franchise in 2012. He has covered Twin Cities sports since 1991. He has also served as a fill in play-by-play voice for the Minnesota Golden Gophers men's hockey team and the Minnesota Twins and the Minnesota Timberwolves. He was the voice of the St. Paul Saints for ten years before joining Fox Sports North. He has won two Emmy Awards; one for play-by-play; the other for hosting/anchoring. His partner for Wild telecasts is either Mike Greenlay, Ryan Carter, Wes Walz, Lou Nanne, Alex Stalock, or Krissy Wendell. LaPanta is a graduate of Totino-Grace High School in Fridley, Minnesota and St. John's University in Collegeville, Minnesota.
