= List of Tampa Bay Lightning broadcasters =

This is a list of broadcasters for the Tampa Bay Lightning ice hockey team.

== Radio ==
John Kelly joined the St. Louis Blues' broadcast team for the 1989-90 season and remained on the job until 1992, when he joined the then-fledgling Tampa Bay Lightning.

In 1993, Larry Hirsch took over as the radio voice of the Lightning, a role he held until 1999.

In 1999, John Ahlers joined the Lightning, where he served as the radio play-by-play voice until 2002. He also hosted the Lightning's television pre-game show and Lightning Weekly, a magazine format program aired on the Sunshine Network.

WDAE had also been the flagship radio station for the Lightning.

=== Current on-air staff ===
The Lightning radio broadcasts are on 102.5 FM WHPT The Bone; the play-by-play announcer is Dave Mishkin, known for his energetic style and his tendency to shriek when the Lightning score. Phil Esposito is the color commentator for home games. Greg Linnelli is the pregame and intermission host.

== Television ==
From 1992 until 2003, WTOG was the flagship of the Tampa Bay Lightning television network. WOPX of recent has Tampa Bay Lightning hockey from Ion's Tampa affiliate and produced by Fox Sports. The Lightning has been cable-exclusive since the 2003–04 season. The Lightning television broadcasts can be seen on Fox Sports Sun. The television play-by-play announcer is Dave Randorf. The color commentator is Brian Engblom. The studio host is Paul Kennedy. Caley Chelios, daughter of Hall of Fame defenseman Chris Chelios, is the in-arena host and Lightning reporter. Former Lightning player Dave Andreychuk and former color commentator Bobby "The Chief" Taylor assist with the television pregame and postgame broadcasts.

Following his playing career, Danny Gare was briefly an assistant coach and TV color analyst for the Lightning, and served on the Buffalo Sabres broadcast team on Empire Sports Network.

From 2001 to 2002, Erin Andrews served as a Lightning reporter for the Sunshine Network. Todd Kalas has filled in as pregame host for the Lightning.

Chris Dingman performed as a color commentator for the Lightning on the Sun Sports network. During the 2016 season, he wasn't expected to return in that role.

On December 10, 2014, long-time color commentator Bobby "The Chief" Taylor announced he would be retiring from the broadcast booth at the end of the 2014–15 season. Taylor had served as the teams color commentator since the 1993–94 season, which was the team's second year of existence. Taylor cited that he desired to be home with his wife Jan more. Taylor said, "The road was starting to get a little stale," and "I've been traveling since I was 15, and that's a long time."

On April 9, 2015, Bobby Taylor completed his final regular season broadcast as the color commentator for the Lightning. Taylor shifted to a teaching role on the pre and post-game shows beginning with the following season. Going into his final 2014-15 game Taylor said: "It's getting a little nostalgic, it's been a long time...I've been in that booth a heck of a long time. I'm excited, yet sad at the same time."

On August 11, 2015, Fox Sports Sun announced Brian Engblom as Bobby Taylor's replacement on color commentary for the 2015–16 season.

Rick Peckham served as the television play-by-play announcer from 1995 until retiring in 2020. Dave Randorf was named as his replacement on January 7, 2021.

=== Current on-air staff ===
- Dave Randorf – play-by-play announcer
- Brian Engblom – analyst
- Paul Kennedy – host and in-game reporter
- Bobby Taylor – pre, post-game and intermission analyst
- Dave Andreychuk – pre, post-game and intermission analyst

== See also ==
- Historical NHL over-the-air television broadcasters
