= List of Vegas Golden Knights broadcasters =

This is a list of Vegas Golden Knights broadcasters from the National Hockey League.

== Television ==
As of the 2023–24 NHL season, Scripps Sports holds local market rights to the Golden Knights. In the Las Vegas market, games air on KMCC, with further affiliates in outlying areas of the team's designated market, which includes Nevada, Idaho, Montana, and Arizona. Dave Goucher and Shane Hnidy are the Golden Knights' commentators. Until the establishment of the Utah Mammoth in 2024, the Golden Knights also maintained affiliates in Utah and Wyoming.

Prior to the 2023–24 season, AT&T SportsNet Rocky Mountain was the regional television rightsholder for all Golden Knights games not broadcast nationally by NBCSN, NBC, ESPN, ABC, or TNT (including its 2023 Stanley Cup Championship appearance). Golden Knights games on AT&T SportsNet were called by former Boston Bruins radio announcer Dave Goucher on play-by-play, and Shane Hnidy, who previously worked color for the Winnipeg Jets on TSN.

KTNV-TV broadcasts games only during the preseason, as well as if the games are part of ABC's national contract with the NHL, although the regional contract does allow for some games to shift over to KTNV.

Following the dormancy of the Arizona Coyotes and establishment of the Utah Mammoth in 2024, the Golden Knights ceded their regional rights to Utah and Wyoming. In exchange, they received broadcasting rights in Arizona, announcing deals with the Tucson-based Arizona 58 and Phoenix-based Arizona 61 on September 26, 2024.

=== Current broadcast affiliates ===
Golden Knights broadcast affiliates as of 2024
Station	Channel	Market
KMCC	34.1	Las Vegas, Nevada (flagship)
Arizona
KASW-TV	61.1	Phoenix
KWBA-TV	58.1	Tucson
Idaho
KIVI-TV	6.2	Boise
		Idaho Falls
KSAW-LD	6.2	Twin Falls
Montana (MTN)
KTVQ	2.2	Billings
KXLF-TV-KBZK	4.2-7.2	Butte-Bozeman
		Glendive
KRTV	3.2	Great Falls
KTVH-DT	12.2	Helena
KPAX-TV	8.2	Missoula
Nevada
KNSN-TV	21.1	Reno

=== Current on-air staff ===
- Daren Millard – Golden Knights studio host
- Dave Goucher – Golden Knights play-by-play
- Shane Hnidy – Golden Knights color commentator
- Darren Eliot – Golden Knights studio analyst
- Ashali Vise – Golden Knights rinkside reporter
- Gary Lawless – Golden Knights reporter/radio color commentator
- Dan D'Uva - Golden Knights radio play-by-play
- Jeff Sharples - Golden Knights alternate studio analyst
- Alec Martinez - Golden Knights alternate studio analyst
- Jamie Hersch - Golden Knights alternate rinkside reporter
- Mark Shunock - In-Arena Host
- Katie Marie Jones - In-Arena Host

== Radio ==
The team has a three-year radio deal with Lotus Broadcasting. Lotus airs the team's games on its Fox Sports Radio affiliate, KKGK 1340/98.9. KKGK fronts a network of nine stations across Nevada, California, Arizona, and Utah. Dan D'Uva and Gary Lawless were announced as the Golden Knights' first radio play-by-play announcer and color commentator respectively.

It was also announced that KLAV's FM translator K255CT would switch to a simulcast of KKGK (then KRLV) on 98.9 FM.

One game a week is also aired on the company's ESPN Deportes Radio affiliate, KENO 1460, making the team one of only three in the NHL to offer Spanish-language broadcasts. And Jesus Lopez and Herbert Castro provide play-by-play and color commentary respectively on KENO.
