= List of Utah Mammoth broadcasters =

The Utah Mammoth are a professional ice hockey team based in Salt Lake City. The Mammoth compete in the National Hockey League (NHL) as a member of the Central Division and began play during the league's 2024–25 season. After the franchise relocated from Phoenix, Arizona, where it played as the Arizona Coyotes, it played as the Utah Hockey Club in the 2024–25 season and as the Mammoth beginning in 2025–2026. Through the team's history in Utah, KUPX-TV (The Spot Utah 16) has been the television broadcaster of the team while KSL Sports Zone (KZNS AM and FM) has been its radio broadcaster. Team owner Smith Entertainment Group offers Mammoth+, a direct-to-consumer streaming service offering all non-nationally televised games, and SEG+, which bundles Mammoth+ with Jazz+, the equivalent for the co-owned Utah Jazz basketball team.

Coyotes television play-by-play announcer Matt McConnell followed the team to Salt Lake City, while Dominic Moore and Nick Olczyk serve as the television analysts. Moore and Olczyk each had prior experience as an analyst, the former with NBC and ESPN and the latter with the Seattle Kraken for two seasons.

The primary play-by-play voice on radio is Mike Folta, who had previously called minor-league games for the AHL's Rockford IceHogs and two ECHL teams. In the 2024–25 season, KSL (1160 AM) simulcast select Utah Hockey Club games.

Both original Mammoth broadcast rightsholders are co-owned with the stations that were the last rightsholders for the Coyotes in Arizona. As part of a wider deal with Scripps Sports, KUPX aired Coyotes games in the 2023–24 season. Bonneville International owns KSL Sports Zone and KMVP-FM, the Phoenix station that last aired the Coyotes.

== Television broadcasters ==
- KUPX-TV (2024–present)

== Television ==
KUPX-TV owner The E. W. Scripps Company and cable provider Comcast failed to reach terms for the carriage of KUPX on Comcast's Utah cable systems ahead of the start of the 2024–25 season. This dispute had not been solved by the end of the season, though Scripps Sports president Brian Lawlor was hopeful that renegotiations with other regional sports networks could open the door to a reevaluation.

Utah Mammoth television broadcasters
Year	Channel	Play-by-play	Color commentator(s)	Ice level reporter	Studio host
2025–26	KUPX-TV/Mammoth+	Matt McConnell	Dominic Moore, Nick Olczyk	Sarah Merrifield	Kim Becker
2024–25	KUPX-TV/Mammoth+	Matt McConnell	Dominic Moore, Nick Olczyk	Sarah Merrifield	Kim Becker

== Radio ==
Utah Mammoth radio broadcasters
Year	Flagship station	Play-by-play	Color commentator(s)	Studio host
2025–26	KSL Sports Zone (KZNS AM and FM)	Mike Folta		
2024–25	KSL Sports Zone (KZNS AM and FM)	Mike Folta		

== See also ==
- List of current National Hockey League broadcasters
