= Steve Carroll =

American sportscaster

- Born: St Louis, Missouri, USA
- Occupation: Sports broadcaster

Steve Carroll is an American professional sports broadcaster from Saint Louis, who has served as the radio play-by-play announcer for the National Hockey League's Anaheim Ducks since 1999.

== Career ==
Other hockey teams that Carroll has announced for include the Des Moines Buccaneers, Nashville Knights, New Haven Nighthawks, New Orleans Brass, and Philadelphia Flyers. He began his career in 1976 as the play-by-play man for the Mineral Area Junior College men's basketball team in Flat River, Missouri.

Not being limited to hockey, Carroll has broadcast for a number of minor league baseball teams, including the Huntsville Stars, Iowa Cubs, Nashville Sounds, and New Orleans Zephyrs. He was also the voice of the United Soccer Leagues' New Orleans Storm and Vanderbilt University basketball.
