= Ralph Strangis =

American sportscaster

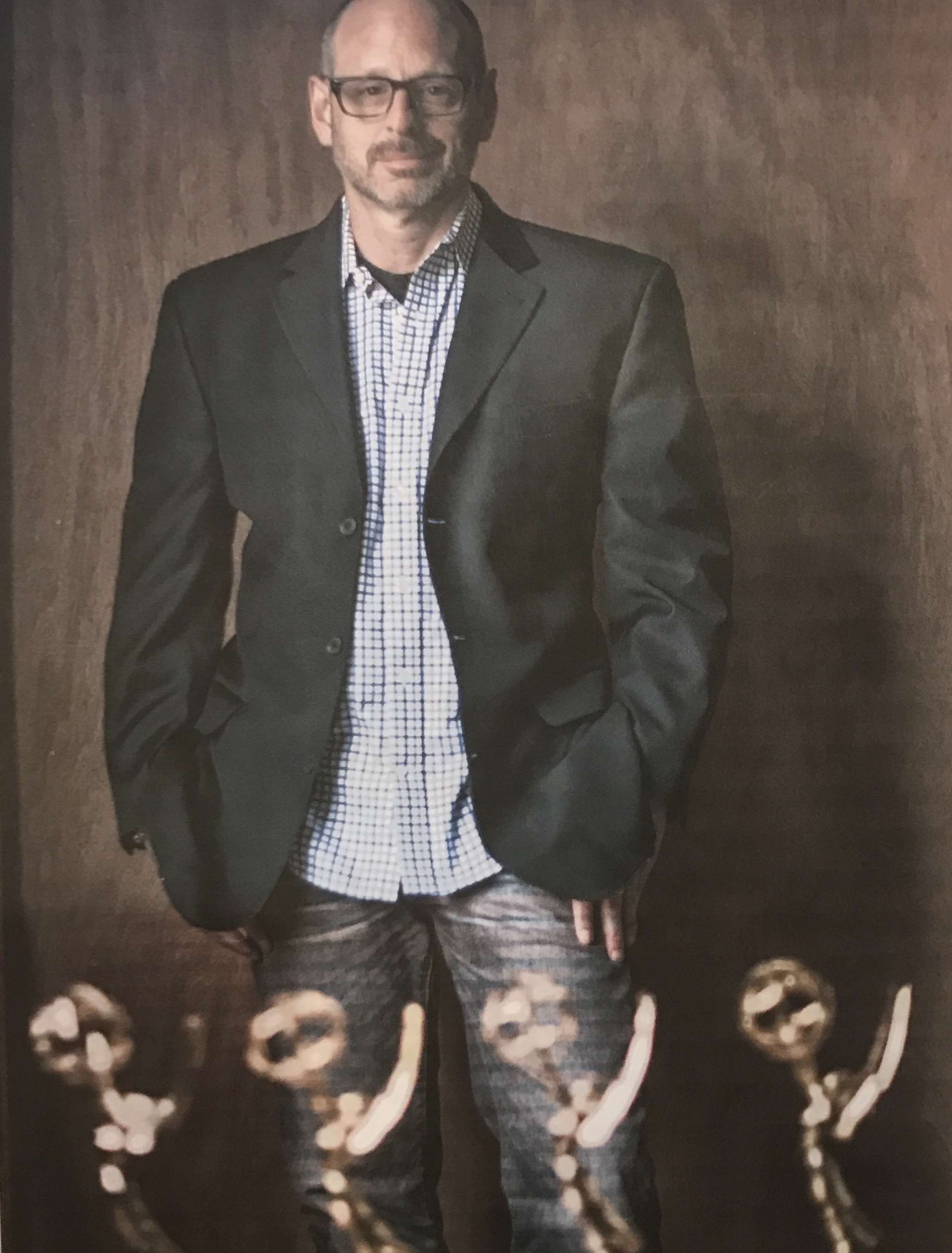
Ralph Strangis 7-time Emmy Award winning Broadcaster

Ralph Strangis (born February 27, 1961) is a former 7-time Emmy Award (Lone Star) winning NHL play-by-play broadcaster who began broadcasting NHL hockey in 1990-91 with the Minnesota North Stars. Strangis relocated to Dallas with the Stars in 1993, took over as the play-by-play announcer in 1995-96, and remained there until April 11, 2015 having called over 2,200 NHL games.

Strangis is continuing his broadcasting, writing, and performing career through his 3rd Period Media online with his own original programming.

Ralph called his final NHL game on December 18, 2021 on television for the Chicago Blackhawks (in Dallas against the Stars) with Caley Chelios and Genna Rose, marking the first time the Hawks had a female analyst in their booth.

== Biography ==
=== 3rd Period Media/Senseless Productions/Consulting ===
Ralph’s broadcasting and media career started with his first paying radio job in 1977 at KTWN in Anoka, Minnesota and has run on several parallel tracks. His robust production experience began at the Emmy award-winning GRFX/NOVOCOM in Los Angeles in 1983 and has continued through the present. He has supervised, written, produced, hosted and narrated long and short form documentaries, features, training and corporate videos, podcasts and audio projects, seminars and live events.

Ralph has worked in media, sports media, writing, acting, content production, broadcast talent training and development, and as an adjunct professor and curriculum creator. He earned a BAAS in "Applied Technology and Performance Improvement" from the University of North Texas in 2016.

Some of Ralph’s projects over the years include: “Deep in the Hearts of Texans” (writer, producer, host), 1993-94 inaugural season Dallas Stars highlight video, “The Cold War” (writer, producer), “Behind the Masc” (director, producer, writer, goaltending instructional video with Andy Moog), “Coca Cola Future Stars" (director, producer, writer training video with Bob Gainey), "Hospitality Suite" (executive producer, producer, lead actor), an American play by Roger Rueff at Gilley’s Dallas, “Citizen Hicks” (working title, a project in development of which he is associate producer, researcher, and long-form documentary interviewer), and “The Priest and the Pragmatist” (executive producer, producer, co-writer, co-host Podcast available on iTunes with Father Joshua Whitfield).

=== NHL Broadcasting ===
In addition to 25 years in the Stars booth, Ralph called NHL hockey on television and radio networks, for Westwood One, NBC Radio, NHL International and NHL Network. He has called 4 Winter Classics, 3 Stadium Series games, the 2018 Olympic Winter Games (men’s and women’s ice hockey) in Pyeongchang, and the 2019 NHL Global Series opener in Berlin, Lausanne, and Prague.

For the 2016-17 NHL season, Strangis worked 26 games for the Los Angeles Kings TV on Fox Sports West, filling in for the ailing Bob Miller.

=== Acting ===
Ralph’s formal acting career began in the early 2000’s with stage roles in Dallas area theaters that include – Dr. Mitchell Lovell, “Murder at the Howard Johnson’s”, Coach Michael, “Rounding Third”, Chef, “Don’t Dress for Dinner, Various roles “Almost Maine”, HBO Executive, “Pure Country” (reading) Casa Manana, Fort Worth, Texas, and Larry Mann, “Hospitality Suite”, Gilley’s Dallas. In 2004, Ralph had a credited, speaking role as the NCAA Tournament Announcer for the Texas Western/Kansas game in the Disney/Jerry Bruckheimer film “Glory Road”. Ralph has had other roles in short films, independent films and stage plays. His role in Palm Springs at the Palm Canyon Theater as Otto Frank in "Diary of Anne Frank" garnered him the Coachella Valley’s “Desert Theater League Award” for Best Lead Actor in a drama. He also directed "Biloxi Blues" for Palm Canyon Theater in 2022, for which he was nominated for a Desert Theater League Award for Best Director.

=== Writing ===
Strangis publishes regularly on SubStack - RalphStack- writing and creating content online, "shining light on the pitfalls of cultural conditioning, shoddy education, and fear-driven practices in sports and life." He’s also working on his second novel, a dystopian thriller for an early 2027 release. Strangis’s writing career began with copywriting and technical writing for long and short educational, training, and sports projects in the late 1980s and continues today. He was a regular op-ed contributor for the Dallas Morning News from 2015-2018, winning the “Texas Press Association 2016” 3rd Place Award, General Commentary Portfolio and the “2017 Best of the West” National/regional award, General Commentary for his work. He has worked as a sports columnist, a biographer, a features writer for NHL.com and as a ghost speechwriter for select NHL Hall of Fame members' acceptance speeches, jersey retirements, or special ceremony speeches. His first novel Saving Lenny Franks was self-published in 2018.

=== Personal life ===
Strangis currently resides in the Coachella Valley in California.

=== Early career ===
Strangis honed his play-by-play skills in Minnesota and Wisconsin, starting with his first paying radio job at the age of 16. He later worked on local public-access television stations doing play by play for a wide variety of high school and college sports. Strangis is especially remembered for his broadcasts of Bloomington Kennedy and Bloomington Jefferson high school hockey that appeared on Bloomington Educational Cable. Strangis' earliest national exposure was as play-by-play man and ring announcer for the American Wrestling Association on ESPN, where he worked alongside Lee Marshall, and later Eric Bischoff, in the waning days of that promotion.

Although Strangis had a great deal of broadcast experience, his tryout as color commentator on the Minnesota North Stars radio network was a longshot; other better-known local hockey personalities received more air time during the auditioning process. The five potential candidates split up a game as guest commentators alongside Al Shaver, then voice of the team. Two better-known talents each took a period, and then the three longshots split up the third, with Strangis going last. When Al Shaver was asked who he liked the best, he chose Strangis.

=== Ralph and Razor ===
In 1996, former NHL goalie Daryl "Razor" Reaugh joined Strangis as the Stars' color commentator, thus creating the popular duo "Ralph and Razor". The two achieved a near cult-like following in the city of Dallas, so much so that, even though fan support and Dallas' media market size could easily support separate radio and television broadcast teams, the Stars elected to continue simulcasting the pair.

In a poll conducted by the Dallas Morning News, his most famous line was voted the most memorable moment in Dallas history. "Hull scores! Yes! Yes! Yes! The Stars win the Stanley Cup, the Stars win the Stanley Cup!"

=== Other appearances ===
He was a contestant on the game show Press Your Luck on the episodes that aired on May 28 and 29, 1984 and Strangis won $7,431 in cash and prizes. Strangis also appears often in commercials for the Stars that air on TV and on the jumbotron at the Stars' home arena.
