= Tom Reid (ice hockey) =

Canadian ice hockey player

- Born: June 24, 1946 (age 79) Fort Erie, Ontario, Canada
- Height: 6 ft 1 in (185 cm)
- Weight: 200 lb (91 kg; 14 st 4 lb)
- Position: Defense
- Shot: Left
- Played for: Chicago Black Hawks; Minnesota North Stars
- Playing career: 1966–1978

Thomas Allan Reid (born June 24, 1946) is a retired professional ice hockey player who played 701 regular season games in the National Hockey League. He played for the Chicago Black Hawks and Minnesota North Stars over an 11-year career.

Reid was born in Fort Erie, Ontario.

== Playing career ==
Not known as a goal scorer, perhaps Reid's best known accomplishment as a player was scoring a rare penalty shot goal on October 14, 1971 against Ken Dryden of the Montreal Canadiens. It was the only penalty shot ever scored against Dryden and one of only 17 goals that Reid scored in his career.

Reid was forced to retire as an active player after the 1977–78 season due to a rash known amongst his colleagues as "the gunk" which covered 70 percent of his body. The rash at its worst secretes a yellowish liquid that sticks to a uniform or protective equipment worn by a player. Reid didn’t start experiencing it until his eighth season in the league and was advised by his doctors to end his career because the steroid and cortisone shots he had been taking would lead to fatal consequences. A similar skin disorder would also abbreviate the career of Marián Hossa four decades later.

== Broadcasting ==
After retiring as a player, Reid spent 12 years as color analyst for the North Stars. After the team's move to Dallas, Reid continued as an analyst for NCAA hockey. He and Bob Kurtz have been part of the radio broadcast team for the Minnesota Wild since the team's inaugural season in 2000.

== Career statistics ==
			Regular season					Playoffs
Season	Team	League	GP	G	A	Pts	PIM	GP	G	A	Pts	PIM
1964–65	St. Catharines Black Hawks	OHA-Jr.	56	4	13	17	106	5	1	0	1	11
1965–66	St. Catharines Black Hawks	OHA-Jr.	45	3	15	18	74	7	0	0	0	44
1966–67	St. Catharines Black Hawks	OHA-Jr.	45	5	19	24	120	4	0	2	2	2
1966–67	St. Louis Braves	CPHL	1	0	0	0	0	—	—	—	—	—
1967–68	Chicago Black Hawks	NHL	56	0	4	4	25	9	0	0	0	2
1967–68	Dallas Black Hawks	CPHL	3	0	1	1	0	—	—	—	—	—
1968–69	Chicago Black Hawks	NHL	30	0	3	3	12	—	—	—	—	—
1968–69	Dallas Black Hawks	CHL	3	0	1	1	4	—	—	—	—	—
1968–69	Minnesota North Stars	NHL	18	0	4	4	38	—	—	—	—	—
1969–70	Minnesota North Stars	NHL	66	1	7	8	51	6	0	1	1	4
1970–71	Minnesota North Stars	NHL	73	3	14	17	62	12	0	6	6	20
1971–72	Minnesota North Stars	NHL	78	6	15	21	107	7	1	4	5	17
1972–73	Minnesota North Stars	NHL	60	1	13	14	50	6	0	2	2	4
1973–74	Minnesota North Stars	NHL	76	4	19	23	81	—	—	—	—	—
1974–75	Minnesota North Stars	NHL	74	1	5	6	103	—	—	—	—	—
1975–76	Minnesota North Stars	NHL	69	0	15	15	52	—	—	—	—	—
1976–77	Minnesota North Stars	NHL	65	0	8	8	52	2	0	0	0	2
1977–78	Minnesota North Stars	NHL	36	1	6	7	21	—	—	—	—	—
NHL totals			701	17	113	130	654	42	1	13	14	49
