= Ken Daniels =

Canadian sportscaster

- Born: March 18, 1959 (age 67); Toronto, Ontario, Canada
- Education: York University
- Occupation: Sportscaster
- Notable credit: Detroit Red Wings television announcer

Ken Daniels (born March 18, 1959) is a Canadian sportscaster. Born in Toronto, he is currently the play-by-play announcer for the Detroit Red Wings of the NHL on FanDuel Sports Network Detroit, now in his 25th season as the voice of the Red Wings, he is also known as a sportscaster with CBC Sports, having worked for the network from 1985 until 1997, the year he joined the Red Wings. Daniels now lives in Birmingham, Michigan.

== Biography ==
=== Early life and career ===
Daniels grew up influencing the game of hockey, not just calling it. He was a hockey official on the ice from the age of 11 until the end of his college career. He was involved with the Greater Toronto Hockey League and put himself through college doing up to four games a night. After graduating from York University in Toronto, Daniels began his radio career in Oshawa and moved to CJCL out of Toronto in 1980, covering both the political beat and general news. He dabbled in sports and kicked off his play-by-play career with the Toronto Maple Leafs in 1988. He would remain with that radio station, which later became Canada's first all-sports radio station, THE FAN, for another nine seasons.

=== CBC Sports ===
While continuing with his radio job, Daniels appeared on television in 1985, with the Canadian Broadcasting Corporation, and by 1990, became a reporter/host for Hockey Night in Canada. In February 1992, Daniels was the main game host, which included appearances with Don Cherry on "Coach's Corner", while Ron MacLean was in Albertville, France covering the Winter Olympics. Meanwhile, Dick Irvin Jr. hosted the Montreal broadcasts. In 1994, Daniels began doing play-by-play for HNIC, usually for games in Western Canada.

While working for CBC, Daniels' diverse sports experience included hosting stints for CBC Sports Weekend and the Champ Car/Indy-Car World Series, as well as Formula One Grand Prix coverage and Toronto Blue Jays baseball. Daniels' broadcast résumé also includes two Olympic games. He covered both the 1988 Summer Olympics in Seoul, and 1996 Olympics in Atlanta, where he could be heard during cycling, baseball, canoeing, kayaking, tennis and judo.

Daniels' Olympic experience landed him a role as the "Olympic host" in the NBC Movie of the Week: On Thin Ice - The Tai Babilonia Story. He also appeared in a film with Tony Danza, The Philadelphia Phenomenon, and was a play-by-play voice for the CBS/CTV television program Due South.

=== Detroit Red Wings ===
For the 1997–98 NHL season, Daniels was lured away from CBC to take over play-by-play for the Detroit Red Wings and teamed up with color commentator Mickey Redmond.

On December 12, 2006 Daniels broadcast a game between the Red Wings and the Ottawa Senators from ice-level between the benches, while color commentator Redmond remained in the booth. This was the first time a U.S. local station had attempted this type of broadcast. Daniels received a Michigan EMMY Award for this broadcast at the 29th Annual Michigan EMMY Awards on June 16, 2007 in Detroit.

On June 4, 2008, Daniels filled in for regular Detroit radio broadcast announcer Ken Kal for Game 6 of the 2008 Stanley Cup Finals between the Red Wings and the Pittsburgh Penguins. Kal was suffering from laryngitis and thus, was unable to call the game. The Red Wings had a 3–2 lead in the series and won the game, and the cup. With 45 seconds left in the game, Daniels took off the headset and handed the game over to Kal, saying, "I don't care if you can't talk, you have to bring it home." Kal called the final 10 seconds, and was able to make the call "...The Detroit Red Wings are the 2008 Stanley Cup Champions!"

Daniels also became a regular announcer for Versus during the 2011 NHL Stanley Cup Playoffs. Daniels is an occasional play-by-play announcer for NBC Sports on NHL games as well as Big Ten Hockey as broadcast by Fox Sports Detroit.

Daniels is a longtime active member of Detroit Sports Media (formerly Detroit Sports Broadcasters Association), founded in 1948 by pioneer Tigers announcer Ty Tyson. Daniels won the Ty Tyson Award for Excellence in Sports Broadcasting from DSM in an on-ice ceremony Sept. 30, 2011 at Joe Louis Arena in Detroit, prior to a Red Wings game.

Daniels' book "If These Walls Could Talk: Detroit Red Wings" (Triumph Books) was released in October 2017.
