= Bob Kurtz (sportscaster) =

American sports broadcaster

- Sports commentary career
- Team: Minnesota Wild
- Genre: Play-by-play
- Sport: National Hockey League

Bob Kurtz is a retired American sportscaster, most recently broadcasting games for the Minnesota Wild hockey team. He has previously been a play-by-play announcer for the Boston Red Sox, Minnesota Twins, Minnesota North Stars, Minnesota Golden Gophers, and Michigan State Spartans.

Kurtz's broadcasting career began at his alma mater Michigan State University, where he called Spartans hockey, football, baseball and basketball from 1974 to 1979. In 1979 he joined KMSP-TV, where he called Minnesota Twins games from 1979 to 1986 and Minnesota North Stars games from 1979 to 1984. He was also the North Stars play by play announcer on KXLI-TV during the 1987–88 NHL season. From 1988 to 1989, he was the sports director at KSTP radio, where he also called University of Minnesota hockey, football and basketball.

In 1989, he joined the New England Sports Network. He was the network's studio host for Boston Red Sox games and play-by-play announcer for the Pawtucket Red Sox and college and minor league hockey. In 1992, he replaced the legendary Ned Martin as the Red Sox play-by-play announcer.

Kurtz returned to Minnesota in 2000 when he was hired to become the first radio play by play announcer for the Minnesota Wild. He was reunited with Tom Reid, who he previously worked with while calling games for the North Stars as well as University of Minnesota and Michigan State hockey broadcasts.

When the Twins' first PA announcer, Bob Casey, died before the start of the 2005, Kurtz was appointed interim PA announcer for the 2005 season. Wild PA announcer Adam Abrams replaced Kurtz as PA announcer for the 2006 season.

Kurtz returned to broadcasting for the Twins in 2011 as a part-time radio play-by-play announcer to go along with his work with the Wild.

Kurtz retired after calling his last Wild game on January 14, 2022. The team honored Kurtz on February 11, 2023, at Xcel Energy Center, before a game with the New Jersey Devils.
