= George Matthews (broadcaster) =

George Matthews is the current radio play-by-play announcer for the Charlottetown Islanders of the QMJHL. He was the original radio play-by-play announcer for the Columbus Blue Jackets, a National Hockey League franchise. He held this position since the team's inaugural 2000–01 season through the 2012–2013 season. He hails from Summerside, Prince Edward Island, Canada.

Entering his 37th season of hockey broadcasting, he is known for his passionate broadcast style and also his penchant for rhyme.

He performed limited broadcasting duties during the 2013–2014 season on the Blue Jackets Radio Network through their flagship station WBNS (FM 97.1).

In addition to calling play-by-play action, he was also a regular contributor to the "Between the Pipes" radio show that airs weekly on WBNS during the hockey season.

== Catch phrases ==
Matthews' trademark is his ability for improvised rhyme. Some examples:

=== General ===
- "Hey hey, whaddya say?" - in reference to an exceptional play.

=== Referring to Skaters ===
- "He boot scoots it..."
- "What a steal, that's the deal!"
- "Jumpin' Jack Flash, Rick Nash!"
- "Ka-Ching It's CASH, RICK NAAAAAAASH!"
- "Nick! (Nikolai Zherdev) with the flick for the Jackets!"

Matthews is also known for referring to a goal as "burying the biscuit" or "burying the stash" (specifically when referring to left winger Rick Nash).

=== Referring to Goaltenders ===
- "Holy Moley, what a goalie!"
- "Return to sender! What a 'tender!"
- "Jim dandy, Mr. Handy!"
- "Goodness Gracious, Leclaire's Sensatious!"
- "Norrena is showing to be a whopper of a stopper tonight!"
- "Lightning quick with the leather
