= Brian Munz =

Canadian broadcaster

Brian Munz is a Canadian broadcaster formerly employed by Bell Media, working on TSN 1290 and TSN, primarily on Winnipeg Jets broadcasts and Hockey Canada events. He is currently the director of communications for Golf Manitoba.

== Hockey announcing career ==
In addition to his work for the Winnipeg Jets, Munz formerly worked for CJOB 680 radio as the play-by-play announcer for the Manitoba Moose of the American Hockey League. He has called Saskatchewan Junior Hockey games on the radio for five seasons for the Nipawin Hawks, Humboldt Broncos, and Melfort Mustangs. Munz was also the play-by-play man for the American Hockey League's Edmonton Road Runners for one year and then hosted game coverage for the Edmonton Oilers. While employed by TSN, he also served as backup to regular announcer Dennis Beyak.

In 2014, Munz was inducted into the Saskatchewan Junior Hockey League Hall of Fame.
