= Randy Moller =

Canadian ice hockey player (born 1963)

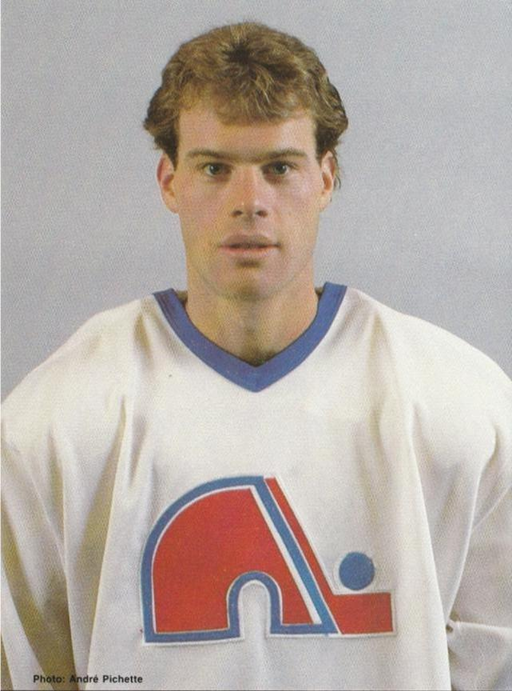
- Moller in 1985 photo
- Born: August 23, 1963 (age 63) Red Deer, Alberta, Canada
- Height: 6 ft 2 in (188 cm)
- Weight: 205 lb (93 kg; 14 st 9 lb)
- Position: Defence
- Shot: Right
- Played for: Quebec Nordiques; New York Rangers; Buffalo Sabres; Florida Panthers
- NHL draft: 11th overall, 1981; Quebec Nordiques
- Playing career: 1982–1995

Randall W. Moller (born August 23, 1963) is a Canadian former professional ice hockey player. He was drafted in the first round, eleventh overall by the Quebec Nordiques in the 1981 National Hockey League (NHL) entry draft. The majority of his career was spent with the Quebec Nordiques. Moller also played with the New York Rangers, Buffalo Sabres and the Florida Panthers. Randy is the brother of Mike Moller. He currently serves as color commentator for the Panthers along with their vice president of broadcasting and alumni.

== Broadcasting career ==
He was featured on the cover of NHLPA Hockey '93 along with goaltender Mike Richter. Moller has been the Panthers' television color analyst since 2015, following eight seasons as the team's radio play-by-play announcer and nine years as a radio analyst before that. He is known for screaming a pop culture reference after Florida Panther goals, though not every goal, and not when the Panthers are out of the game. Examples such as references to Tracy Morgan on 30 Rock, a Christian Bale tirade, film quotes from Wedding Crashers, Jaws, and Forrest Gump are included on a YouTube clip produced by The Dan Le Batard Show with Stugotz.

The goal calls by Moller were done in conjunction with The Dan Le Batard Show, which shared the radio station that hosts the Florida Panthers radio play-by-play. The show and listeners provide Moller with numerous pop culture references, and he then chooses what he likes and uses it during games.

== Career statistics ==
=== Regular season and playoffs ===
| | | | Regular season | | | | | Playoffs |
| Season | Team | League | GP | G | A | Pts | PIM | GP | G | A | Pts | PIM |
|---|---|---|---|---|---|---|---|---|---|---|---|---|
| 1979–80 | Red Deer Rustlers | AJHL | 56 | 3 | 34 | 37 | 253 | — | — | — | — | — |
| 1979–80 | Billings Bighorns | WHL | 3 | 0 | 0 | 0 | 4 | — | — | — | — | — |
| 1980–81 | Lethbridge Broncos | WHL | 46 | 4 | 21 | 25 | 176 | 9 | 0 | 4 | 4 | 24 |
| 1981–82 | Lethbridge Broncos | WHL | 60 | 20 | 55 | 75 | 249 | 12 | 4 | 6 | 10 | 65 |
| 1981–82 | Quebec Nordiques | NHL | — | — | — | — | — | 1 | 0 | 0 | 0 | 2 |
| 1982–83 | Quebec Nordiques | NHL | 75 | 2 | 12 | 14 | 145 | 4 | 1 | 0 | 1 | 4 |
| 1983–84 | Quebec Nordiques | NHL | 74 | 4 | 14 | 18 | 147 | 9 | 1 | 0 | 1 | 45 |
| 1984–85 | Quebec Nordiques | NHL | 79 | 7 | 22 | 29 | 120 | 18 | 2 | 2 | 4 | 40 |
| 1985–86 | Quebec Nordiques | NHL | 69 | 5 | 18 | 23 | 141 | 3 | 0 | 0 | 0 | 26 |
| 1986–87 | Quebec Nordiques | NHL | 71 | 5 | 9 | 14 | 144 | 13 | 1 | 4 | 5 | 23 |
| 1987–88 | Quebec Nordiques | NHL | 66 | 3 | 22 | 25 | 169 | — | — | — | — | — |
| 1988–89 | Quebec Nordiques | NHL | 74 | 7 | 22 | 29 | 136 | — | — | — | — | — |
| 1989–90 | New York Rangers | NHL | 60 | 1 | 12 | 13 | 139 | 10 | 1 | 6 | 7 | 32 |
| 1990–91 | New York Rangers | NHL | 61 | 4 | 19 | 23 | 161 | 6 | 0 | 2 | 2 | 11 |
| 1991–92 | Binghamton Rangers | AHL | 3 | 0 | 1 | 1 | 0 | — | — | — | — | — |
| 1991–92 | New York Rangers | NHL | 43 | 2 | 7 | 9 | 78 | — | — | — | — | — |
| 1991–92 | Buffalo Sabres | NHL | 13 | 1 | 2 | 3 | 59 | 7 | 0 | 0 | 0 | 8 |
| 1992–93 | Rochester Americans | AHL | 3 | 1 | 0 | 1 | 10 | — | — | — | — | — |
| 1992–93 | Buffalo Sabres | NHL | 35 | 2 | 7 | 9 | 83 | — | — | — | — | — |
| 1993–94 | Buffalo Sabres | NHL | 78 | 2 | 11 | 13 | 154 | 7 | 0 | 2 | 2 | 8 |
| 1994–95 | Florida Panthers | NHL | 17 | 0 | 3 | 3 | 16 | — | — | — | — | — |
| NHL totals | | | 815 | 45 | 180 | 225 | 1692 | 78 | 6 | 16 | 22 | 199 |

=== International ===
| Year | Team | Event | Result | GP | G | A | Pts | PIM |
|---|---|---|---|---|---|---|---|---|
| 1982 | Canada | WJC | 1st place, gold medalist(s) | 7 | 0 | 3 | 3 | 4 |
| Junior totals | | | | 7 | 0 | 3 | 3 | 4 |

== Awards ==
- WHL Second All-Star Team – 1982

Awards and achievements
| Preceded by Michel Goulet | Quebec Nordiques first-round draft pick 1981 | Succeeded by David Shaw |
