= Dean Brown (sportscaster) =

Canadian hockey commentator

Dean Brown (born in Saint Boniface, Manitoba on November 3, 1961) is a Canadian hockey commentator. He is known for being the main play-by-play announcer for the National Hockey League's Ottawa Senators since the team's inaugural season, at first on Ottawa's talk-radio station 580 CFRA in the franchise's first years, and since 1998 on TSN 1200 radio.

== Early career ==
Prior to becoming the voice of the Senators, Brown was a news anchor at CFRW in Winnipeg, Manitoba and at CKSL in London. Before moving into sports and moving to 580 CFRA in Ottawa in 1983. Brown later became the station's morning sports anchor, sports director and play-by-play voice of the now defunct Canadian Football League's Ottawa Rough Riders franchise.

Brown was the radio play-by-play voice of the 1989 Grey Cup and was the youngest broadcaster ever selected to perform those duties on the national and international broadcast of the CFL's championship game.

== Ottawa Senators ==
Brown currently does play-by-play of Senators games on TSN Radio 1200 alongside analyst Gord Wilson. Brown previously did games on Sportsnet East alongside former New York Islanders defenceman Denis Potvin. In April 2014, Brown signed a 7-year contract with TSN to do play-by-play of all Senators games on TSN 1200.

He was previously paired with former goaltender Greg Millen until the 2002–03 season during Senators games on both A-Channel and Sportsnet.

He is known for his distinctive way of yelling, "Scores!", as well as for his commonly used phrases such as "Scramble!", "Winds, fires" "Oh what a save by (goaltender)!", "Oh my heavens!", "(certain player) blows a tire", and calling the trapezoidal area behind the net where goaltenders may not play the puck, the "forbidden zone". Not to mention, he came up with the clever "sudden victory overtime" phrase. The reason for this is that the losing team still gets a point, therefore it is no longer "sudden death".

== National broadcasting assignments ==
From November 1998 until Rogers Media acquired the NHL rights in 2014, Brown also did play-by-play on CBC's Hockey Night in Canada, usually on telecasts from Ottawa. Brown also occasionally worked as a football play-by-play broadcaster for the CFL on CBC and was a part-time general sports reporter for TSN and the now defunct Canadian Football Network.
