= Curt Keilback =

Curt Keilback (/ˈkiːlbæk/ KEEL-bak; born 1948) is a freelance Canadian sportscaster and actor, best known as the former play-by-play voice of the National Hockey League's Winnipeg Jets and Phoenix Coyotes.

Keilback, a native of Brandon, Manitoba, began his broadcasting career as a sports director for CJGX radio in Yorkton, Saskatchewan. Keilback later moved to Regina, where he began doing play-by-play for CKCK.

In 1979, Keilback moved to Winnipeg to work on Jets radio and television broadcasts. Starting as a color commentator, he became the regular play-by-play voice of the Jets in 1982. When the Jets relocated to Phoenix, Arizona, in 1996, Keilback was retained as the voice of the new Phoenix Coyotes. Keilback called games for the Coyotes until 2007, at which time the Coyotes decided not to renew his contract.

Since leaving the Coyotes broadcast booth, Keilback has returned to Winnipeg, where he called Manitoba Junior Hockey League games for two seasons. He has also appeared in a number of films, including the 2011 hockey comedy Goon. Keilback served as a substitute play-by-play man for Rick Jeanneret when the Sabres took their annual road trips to the West Coast in the late 2000s and early 2010s.

Keilback is a member of the Manitoba Hockey Hall of Fame, inducted in the media category.

He has written one book, Two Minutes For Talking to Myself, published in 2022.

Keilback resides in Winnipeg, Manitoba where he retired with his wife Linda. He has two sons and three grandchildren.
