= Bill Lindsay =

American ice hockey player

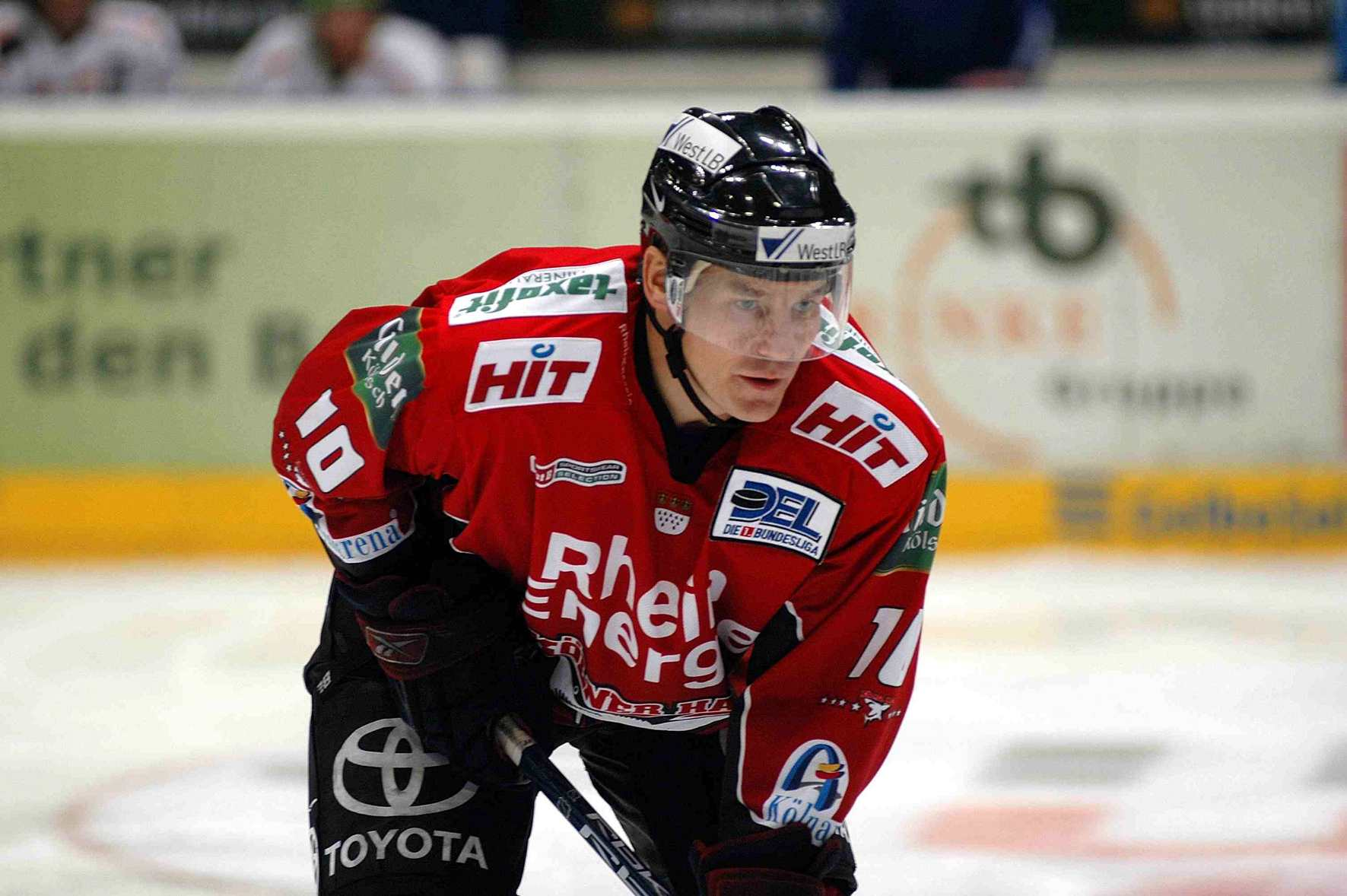
- Lindsay with the Cologne Sharks in 2006.
- Born: May 17, 1971 (age 54) Fernie, British Columbia, Canada
- Height: 6 ft 0 in (183 cm)
- Weight: 195 lb (88 kg; 13 st 13 lb)
- Position: Right wing
- Shot: Left
- Played for: Quebec Nordiques; Florida Panthers; Calgary Flames; San Jose Sharks; Montreal Canadiens; Atlanta Thrashers
- National team: United States
- NHL draft: 103rd overall, 1991; Quebec Nordiques
- Playing career: 1991–2007

William Hamilton Lindsay (born May 17, 1971) is an American former professional ice hockey player. He played in the National Hockey League (NHL) for the Quebec Nordiques, Florida Panthers, Calgary Flames, San Jose Sharks, Montreal Canadiens and the Atlanta Thrashers. He was drafted 103rd overall by the Nordiques in the 1991 NHL entry draft.

== Playing career ==
Lindsay played in 777 NHL regular season games, scoring 83 goals and 141 assists for 224 points and picking up 922 penalty minutes. On Saturday, April 27, 1996 Lindsay scored the winning goal to give the Panthers their first-ever playoff series victory. The Florida Panthers eventually made it all the way to the Stanley Cup finals in the 1995–96 NHL season, losing to the Colorado Avalanche in four games. Lindsay was also a part of the Hamilton Bulldogs team that made it all the way to the Calder Cup finals in 2003 but then lost to the Houston Aeros in a seven game series by a score of 4–3.

Lindsay suffered a life-threatening throat injury in what proved to be his final NHL game on January 3, 2004.

He then moved to the Deutsche Eishockey Liga in Germany for the Kölner Haie. He is now the radio color commentator for Florida Panthers home games and an analyst appearing across NHL Network's programming.

== Career statistics ==
=== Regular season and playoffs ===
			Regular season					Playoffs
Season	Team	League	GP	G	A	Pts	PIM	GP	G	A	Pts	PIM
1988–89	Vernon Lakers	BCHL	56	24	29	53	166	—	—	—	—	—
1989–90	Tri-City Americans	WHL	72	40	45	85	84	7	3	0	3	14
1990–91	Tri-City Americans	WHL	63	46	47	93	151	5	3	6	9	10
1991–92	Tri-City Americans	WHL	42	34	59	93	111	3	2	3	5	16
1991–92	Quebec Nordiques	NHL	23	2	4	6	14	—	—	—	—	—
1992–93	Quebec Nordiques	NHL	44	4	9	13	16	—	—	—	—	—
1992–93	Halifax Citadels	AHL	20	11	13	24	18	—	—	—	—	—
1993–94	Florida Panthers	NHL	84	6	6	12	97	—	—	—	—	—
1994–95	Florida Panthers	NHL	48	10	9	19	46	—	—	—	—	—
1995–96	Florida Panthers	NHL	73	12	22	34	57	22	5	5	10	18
1996–97	Florida Panthers	NHL	81	11	23	34	120	3	0	1	1	8
1997–98	Florida Panthers	NHL	82	12	16	28	80	—	—	—	—	—
1998–99	Florida Panthers	NHL	75	12	15	27	92	—	—	—	—	—
1999–2000	Calgary Flames	NHL	80	8	12	20	86	—	—	—	—	—
2000–01	Calgary Flames	NHL	52	1	9	10	97	—	—	—	—	—
2000–01	San Jose Sharks	NHL	16	0	4	4	29	6	0	0	0	16
2001–02	Florida Panthers	NHL	63	4	7	11	117	—	—	—	—	—
2001–02	Montreal Canadiens	NHL	13	1	3	4	23	11	2	2	4	2
2002–03	Montreal Canadiens	NHL	19	0	2	2	23	—	—	—	—	—
2002–03	Hamilton Bulldogs	AHL	28	6	12	18	89	23	10	3	13	31
2003–04	Atlanta Thrashers	NHL	24	0	0	0	25	—	—	—	—	—
2003–04	Chicago Wolves	AHL	13	3	5	8	8	—	—	—	—	—
2004–05	Long Beach Ice Dogs	ECHL	32	9	14	23	78	7	2	2	4	12
2005–06	Syracuse Crunch	AHL	4	0	2	2	0	—	—	—	—	—
2005–06	Kölner Haie	DEL	32	9	12	21	78	9	4	4	8	44
2006–07	Kölner Haie	DEL	45	7	16	23	79	9	1	2	3	26
NHL totals			777	83	141	224	922	42	7	8	15	44

=== International ===
Year	Team	Event	GP	G	A	Pts	PIM
1991	United States	WJC	7	3	5	8	8
1994	United States	WC	5	3	1	4	2

== Awards ==
- WHL West Second All-Star Team – 1992

== Post-hockey career ==
Lindsay has been a color analyst for the Florida Panthers and for the NHL since he retired from playing and is often affectionately referred to as “Billy” in his broadcasting career.

== Personal life ==
Lindsay is a member of the Church of Jesus Christ of Latter-day Saints.
