= Jeff Rimer =

Canadian-born American broadcaster (born 1951)

Jeff Rimer (born July 18, 1951) is a retired Canadian-born American broadcaster who recently served as the television play-by-play announcer for the Columbus Blue Jackets of the National Hockey League.

Rimer began his broadcasting career in Calgary with Cable 10 and CFAC Radio. While at CFAC, he served as the play-by-play man for the Calgary Centennials of the Western Hockey League. After a stint in Lethbridge, Rimer worked for CBC Television in Edmonton under veteran sportscaster Ernie Afaganis. He then worked for CFCF Radio, where he was the pre- and post-game show host for the Montreal Canadiens. He was also CBC's gymnastics commentator during the 1976 Summer Olympics in Montreal. In 1984 he was involved in a scuffle with Pete Rose over something Rose contended Rimer said about him on his radio program.

In 1984, Rimer moved to WBAL radio in Baltimore, where he served as sports director and host of Orioles' pre and postgame reports. In 1990 he became the television play-by-play announcer for the Washington Capitals. In 1992, Rimer was replaced on the Capitals' cable broadcasts by Kenny Albert, but continued to call the team's games on WDCA-TV. In 1993, Rimer began calling games for the expansion Florida Panthers. During the 1993–94 season he called 33 games for the Panthers and 20 Capitals road games while still working at WBAL before covering the Panthers full time. He remained with the Panthers until 2004 when former Panther coach and the Columbus Blue Jackets' president and general manager Doug MacLean hired Rimer for the same job in Columbus. In 2017, he called his 2,000th NHL game.
