= Mike Greenlay =

Brazilian-Canadian ice hockey player (born 1968)

- Born: September 15, 1968 (age 58) Vitória, Brazil
- Height: 6 ft 3 in (191 cm)
- Weight: 200 lb (91 kg; 14 st 4 lb)
- Position: Goaltender
- Caught: Left
- Played for: Edmonton Oilers
- NHL draft: 189th overall, 1986; Edmonton Oilers
- Playing career: 1989–1996

Michael R. Greenlay (born September 15, 1968) is a Brazilian-Canadian former ice hockey goaltender. Greenlay played two games for the Edmonton Oilers in 1989–90. He was a successful amateur player who spent most of his pro career in the minor leagues.

Greenlay was born in Vitória, Brazil and raised in Calgary, Alberta.

Greenlay was selected 189th overall by Edmonton in 1986 out of the Calgary AAA Midgets. He then played parts of three years at Lake Superior State. He was a member of the Lake Superior State Lakers 1988 NCAA Championship men's ice hockey team. Early in the 1988–89 season, he left the Lakers to suit up for the WHL's Saskatoon Blades. Greenlay helped the squad reach the Memorial Cup final and was named the top goaltender at the tournament and an all-star.

Besides his two-game stint with Edmonton, Greenlay excelled for two years with the AHL's Cape Breton Oilers. He also toiled in the ECHL and IHL before retiring early in the 1995–96 season. In 1994 Greenlay shared the James Norris Memorial Trophy (IHL) with J.C. Bergeron for allowing the fewest goals in the IHL. He also led all post-season goalies in wins while helping the Atlanta Knights win the Turner Cup in 1994.

Greenlay provided color commentary for the Minnesota Wild until 2020 when his contract expired.

== Career statistics ==
=== Regular season and playoffs ===
			Regular season									Playoffs
Season	Team	League	GP	W	L	T	MIN	GA	SO	GAA	SV%	GP	W	L	MIN	GA	SO	GAA	SV%
1985–86	Penticton Knights	BCHL	1	1	0	0	60	5	0	5.00	.844	—	—	—	—	—	—	—	—
1986–87	Lake Superior State University	CCHA	17	7	5	0	744	44	0	3.54	.869	—	—	—	—	—	—	—	—
1987–88	Lake Superior State University	CCHA	19	10	3	3	1023	57	0	3.34	—	—	—	—	—	—	—	—	—
1988–89	Lake Superior State University	CCHA	2	1	1	0	85	6	0	4.23	.846	—	—	—	—	—	—	—	—
1988–89	Saskatoon Blades	WHL	20	10	8	1	1128	86	0	4.57	.867	6	2	0	174	16	0	5.52	.837
1988–89	Saskatoon Blades	M-Cup	—	—	—	—	—	—	—	—	—	4	2	2	243	14	0	3.46	—
1989–90	Edmonton Oilers	NHL	2	0	0	0	20	4	0	11.75	.765	—	—	—	—	—	—	—	—
1989–90	Cape Breton Oilers	AHL	46	19	18	5	2595	146	2	3.38	.888	5	1	3	306	26	0	5.09	—
1990–91	Cape Breton Oilers	AHL	11	5	2	0	493	33	0	4.02	.862	—	—	—	—	—	—	—	—
1990–91	Knoxville Cherokees	ECHL	29	17	9	2	1725	108	2	3.75	.886	—	—	—	—	—	—	—	—
1991–92	Cape Breton Oilers	AHL	3	1	1	1	144	12	0	5.00	.848	—	—	—	—	—	—	—	—
1991–92	Knoxville Cherokees	ECHL	27	8	12	2	1415	113	0	4.79	.873	—	—	—	—	—	—	—	—
1992–93	Louisville Icehawks	ECHL	27	12	11	2	1437	96	1	4.01	.897	—	—	—	—	—	—	—	—
1992–93	Atlanta Knights	IHL	12	5	3	2	637	40	0	3.77	.868	—	—	—	—	—	—	—	—
1993–94	Atlanta Knights	IHL	34	16	10	4	1741	104	0	3.58	.875	13	11	1	749	29	1	2.32	.910
1994–95	Atlanta Knights	IHL	20	7	10	0	1059	72	0	4.08	.863	—	—	—	—	—	—	—	—
1994–95	Hershey Bears	AHL	16	5	5	2	704	46	0	3.92	.881	5	2	3	270	12	0	2.66	.916
1995–96	Houston Aeros	IHL	1	0	1	0	17	2	0	7.06	.600	—	—	—	—	—	—	—	—
NHL totals			2	0	0	0	21	4	0	11.75	.765	—	—	—	—	—	—	—	—
