= Steve Goldstein (sportscaster) =

American sportscaster

Steven "Goldie" Goldstein is the television play-by-play broadcaster for the Florida Panthers. Goldstein is the voice of the Miami Dolphins for TV preseason games on CBS Miami and host of the Dolphins Radio pregame show.

== Education ==
Goldstein grew up in Brooklyn, New York and attended Canarsie High School. He graduated from Syracuse University's S. I. Newhouse School of Public Communications in 1991 with a degree in broadcast journalism.

== Broadcasting career ==
Goldstein also anchors news and sports at CBS-TV Miami, Channel 4. Goldstein was the hockey play-by-play radio broadcaster at both the 2010 and 2014 Olympic Winter Games for Westwood One Radio Network. He also serves as Westwood One/NBC Radio's play-by-play NHL announcer, rinkside reporter and Stanley Cup Finals host. Goldstein has found his way into the tennis world, calling matches for the USTA (ESPN and world broadcasts). He previously served as a play-by-play announcer and radio host for Panthers radio broadcasts. He has been a morning drive host and hosted pregame/halftime/postgame shows for the Miami Dolphins and Miami Hurricanes. He was a host for the TV shows "Sportsbang" on CBS Miami and Micosukee Sports Rap. From 1991–1994, he worked for CBS Radio and CBS Television in New York. For CBS Radio, he served as a radio host for ice hockey at the 1998 Winter Olympics and producer at the 1994 games. He has also hosted The Pete Rose Show and has done reporting duties at WFAN radio in New York.

He was named the 2019 Florida Sportscaster of the Year by the National Sports Media Association.

== Personal life ==
Goldstein lives in Weston, Florida with his wife Dana and their two sons. He also is chairman of his foundation, Goldie's Gang, which helps kids and families in need in South Florida.
