= Dave Strader =

American sportscaster (1955–2017)

- Born: February 24, 1955
- Died: October 1, 2017 (aged 62); Glens Falls, New York, U.S.
- Occupation: Sportscaster
- Years active: 1985–2017
- Awards: Foster Hewitt Memorial Award (2017)

David Strader (February 24, 1955 – October 1, 2017) was an American sportscaster, primarily known for his play-by-play commentary of ice hockey. During his career, he worked on telecasts for the Detroit Red Wings, Florida Panthers, Phoenix Coyotes and Dallas Stars of the National Hockey League (NHL). He also worked nationally in the United States for ESPN, ABC, Versus, NBC, and NBCSN.

On April 17, 2017 the Hockey Hall of Fame announced that Strader was the 2017 recipient of the Foster Hewitt Memorial Award for his outstanding contributions to play-by-play broadcasting of the game of ice hockey.

While hockey was his primary focus, he also called college basketball, WNBA, and NBA D-League games.

== Biography ==
A native of Glens Falls, New York, Strader honed his broadcasting skills at the college radio station WMUA 91.1 while studying for his Bachelor of Arts in Communication Studies at the University of Massachusetts Amherst.

=== Broadcasting career ===
==== Local work ====
Strader's professional broadcasting career began as the radio announcer and public relations director for the Adirondack Red Wings of the AHL from 1979 to 1985. A two-time New York State Broadcasters Association honoree, Strader was named the AHL's top public relations professional in 1984.

In 1985, the NHL's Detroit Red Wings called Strader up from the farm club, and he took over the play-by-play duties, calling TV games on both WKBD and PASS Sports alongside Mickey Redmond until 1996. Strader called games for the Florida Panthers for the 2005–06 and 2006–07 seasons when not calling games for NBC or Versus. Strader was hired by the Phoenix Coyotes on July 2, 2007. He was reunited with his former ESPN/ABC partner, Darren Pang, for Coyotes broadcasts for two seasons. With no television contract in place for Coyotes games, Pang left in 2009 to join the St. Louis Blues, and Tyson Nash joined him in the broadcast booth.

In July 2011, Strader left his position with the Coyotes to accept a full-time job with NBC/Versus. He joined the NHL Dallas Stars as their TV play-by-play voice at the start of the 2015-2016 NHL season.

In June 2016, Strader was diagnosed with cholangiocarcinoma, a fairly rare and aggressive form of cancer of the bile duct. During a break in his treatment, he returned to the broadcast booth on February 18, 2017, the first of the five-game Dallas home stand, a 4-3 overtime home win against the Tampa Bay Lightning. After the game, the Stars saluted Strader at center ice. In all, he broadcast all five games of that Dallas home stand including one on NBC on February 26, 2017. In April 2017, he also broadcast games in the first round Stanley Cup playoff series between the Washington Capitals and Toronto Maple Leafs on NBC networks.

==== National work ====
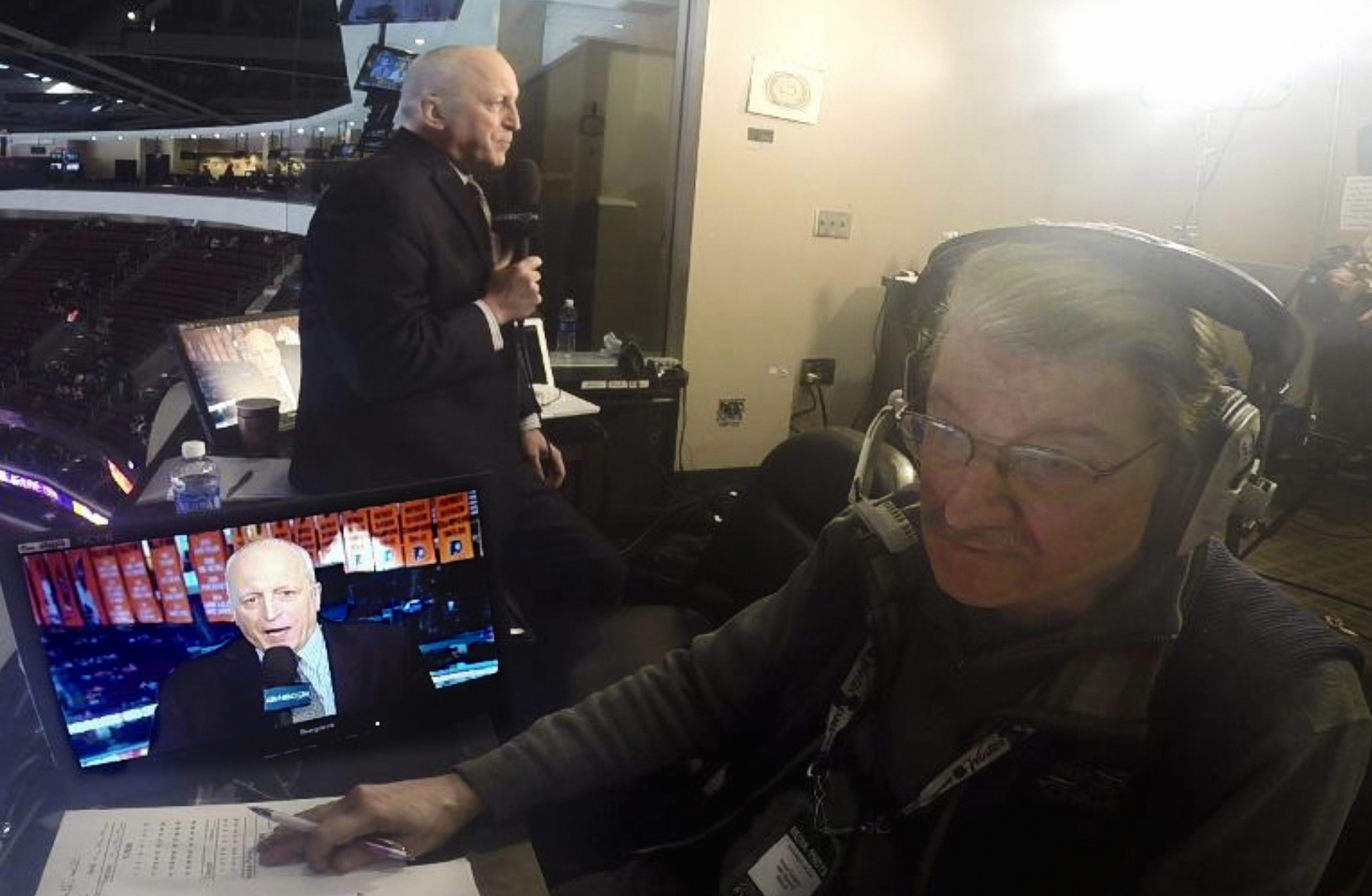
Dave Strader broadcasting NHL hockey for NHL on NBC (2015)

After long time ESPN broadcaster Tom Mees died from drowning in 1996, Strader was hired by the cable network to take the vacant play-by-play spot on National Hockey Night broadcasts. Strader was usually paired with Darren Pang and Brian Engblom on the network's secondary hockey broadcast team. When ABC got the NHL broadcast network contract in 2000, Strader worked for them as well. He also called NHL games for Fox in the mid-1990s, and the Stanley Cup Finals for NHL International from 1997-2015.

He moved to NBC and Versus when they got the NHL contracts in 2005. Strader also provided hockey play-by-play for NBC's coverage of the 2006 Winter Olympics in Turin, Italy, the 2010 Winter Olympics in Vancouver, British Columbia, and the 2014 Winter Olympics in Sochi, Russia. Strader served as a last-minute play-by-play replacement for Mike Emrick on NBC's coverage of the NHL Winter Classic between the Detroit Red Wings and Chicago Blackhawks on January 1, 2009, when Emrick was unable to broadcast the game due to laryngitis. Strader also called the 2011 NHL Heritage Classic on Versus, where the Montreal Canadiens played the Calgary Flames at McMahon Stadium in Calgary, Alberta.

In 2012, he covered the Battle 4 Atlantis men's college basketball preseason tournament on the NBC Sports Network alongside Donny Marshall during the 2012–13 NHL lockout.

== Death ==
Strader died on October 1, 2017, at the age of 62 at his Glens Falls home, from bile duct cancer.

The Hockey Hall of Fame had announced earlier that year on April 17 that Strader was the 2017 recipient of the Foster Hewitt Memorial Award, but his actual induction ceremony was scheduled months later on November 13. At the time of the announcement, Strader stated that he was looking forward to the ceremony, saying that it was the greatest honor he had ever received. Due to his death, Strader's sons accepted the award posthumously at the November induction ceremony on his behalf. In addition, three days later, Mike Emrick, NBC's lead play-by-play announcer, paid a tribute to him, in a full segment during the first intermission. On October 7, 2017, the Stars and Vegas Golden Knights paid a moment of silence in his honor, while also honoring a Stars staff member killed in the summer, and the 2017 Las Vegas shooting victims.
