= List of Grey Cup broadcasters =

The following is a list of the television and radio networks and announcers that have broadcast the Grey Cup in English.

Since The Sports Network became the Canadian Football League's exclusive broadcast partner in 2008, Paul Graham produced coverage for all Grey Cup games until 2024.

== Television ==
=== 2020s ===
Year	Network	Play-by-play	Colour commentator(s)	Sideline reporters	Pregame host	Pregame analysts
2026	TSN; CTV; Crave	Rod Smith	Glen Suitor	Claire Hanna and Matthew Scianitti	James Duthie and Kate Beirness	Davis Sanchez, Milt Stegall, Henoc Muamba, Luke Willson, and Zach Collaros
2025	TSN; CTV	Rod Smith	Glen Suitor	Claire Hanna and Matthew Scianitti	James Duthie and Kate Beirness	Davis Sanchez, Milt Stegall, Henoc Muamba, Luke Willson, and Zach Collaros
2024	TSN; CTV	Rod Smith	Glen Suitor	Claire Hanna and Matthew Scianitti	James Duthie and Kate Beirness	Davis Sanchez, Matt Dunigan, Milt Stegall, Henoc Muamba, Paul LaPolice, Jim Barker, and Bo Levi Mitchell
2023	TSN	Rod Smith	Glen Suitor	Claire Hanna and Matthew Scianitti	James Duthie and Kate Beirness	Davis Sanchez, Matt Dunigan, Milt Stegall, Paul LaPolice, Jim Barker, and Bo Levi Mitchell
2022	TSN	Rod Smith	Glen Suitor	Claire Hanna and Farhan Lalji	Kate Beirness and Darren Dutchyshen	Davis Sanchez, Matt Dunigan, Milt Stegall, Paul LaPolice, and Bo Levi Mitchell
2021	TSN	Rod Smith	Glen Suitor	Sara Orlesky and Matthew Scianitti	James Duthie and Kate Beirness	Davis Sanchez, Matt Dunigan, Milt Stegall, Jim Barker, and Bo Levi Mitchell

==== Notes ====
- In May 2020, due to postponement of the regular season and other factors relating to the COVID-19 pandemic, it was announced that the 108th Grey Cup festivities in Regina, Saskatchewan (which were to be the first to be hosted by the new Mosaic Stadium) had been cancelled and postponed to 2022, and that the site of the game, if held, would be based on regular season records rather than as a neutral site. The Grey Cup itself was later cancelled in August along with the 2020 CFL season, which was the first year that the Grey Cup was not contested since 1919.

=== 2010s ===
Year	Network	Play-by-play	Colour commentator(s)	Sideline reporters	Pregame host	Pregame analysts
2019	TSN	Chris Cuthbert	Glen Suitor	Sara Orlesky and Matthew Scianitti	James Duthie, Rod Smith, Brian Williams, and Kate Beirness	Davis Sanchez, Mike Benevides, Matt Dunigan, Milt Stegall, and Henry Burris
2018	TSN	Chris Cuthbert	Glen Suitor	Sara Orlesky and Matthew Scianitti	James Duthie, Rod Smith, and Brian Williams	Davis Sanchez, Jock Climie, Matt Dunigan, Milt Stegall, and Henry Burris
2017	TSN	Chris Cuthbert	Glen Suitor	Sara Orlesky and Matthew Scianitti	James Duthie, Rod Smith, and Brian Williams	Jock Climie, Matt Dunigan, Milt Stegall, and Henry Burris
2016	TSN	Chris Cuthbert	Glen Suitor	Sara Orlesky and Matthew Scianitti	James Duthie, Rod Smith, and Brian Williams	Jock Climie, Matt Dunigan, Milt Stegall, and Chris Schultz
2015	TSN	Chris Cuthbert	Glen Suitor	Sara Orlesky and Farhan Lalji	James Duthie, Rod Smith, and Brian Williams	Jock Climie, Matt Dunigan, Milt Stegall, Chris Schultz, and Paul LaPolice
2014	TSN	Chris Cuthbert	Glen Suitor	Sara Orlesky and Farhan Lalji	James Duthie, Rod Smith, and Brian Williams	Jock Climie, Matt Dunigan, Milt Stegall, Chris Schultz, and Paul LaPolice
2013	TSN	Chris Cuthbert	Glen Suitor	Sara Orlesky and Farhan Lalji	Dave Randorf and Brian Williams	Jock Climie, Matt Dunigan, Milt Stegall, Chris Schultz, and Paul LaPolice
2012	TSN	Chris Cuthbert	Glen Suitor	Sara Orlesky and Farhan Lalji	Dave Randorf and Brian Williams	Jock Climie, Matt Dunigan, Milt Stegall, and Chris Schultz
2011	TSN	Chris Cuthbert	Glen Suitor	Sara Orlesky, Farhan Lalji, and Duane Forde	Dave Randorf and Brian Williams	Jock Climie, Matt Dunigan, and Chris Schultz
2010	TSN	Chris Cuthbert	Glen Suitor	Sara Orlesky and Farhan Lalji	Dave Randorf and Brian Williams	Jock Climie, Matt Dunigan, and Chris Schultz

==== Notes ====
- The 107th Grey Cup in 2019 was televised in Canada by TSN (English) and RDS (French), in the United States on ESPN2, in the United Kingdom by BT Sport, and in Mexico by MVS. Outside of North America, the Grey Cup was broadcast by ESPN International and its affiliated networks to 74 countries. The game was also available for online streaming for international viewers (outside of Canada, the United States, and the United Kingdom) through the CFL's streaming platform, in Canada through the TV Everywhere system TSN Go and in the United States via ESPN's TV Everywhere system. TSN Radio stations, including Tiger-Cats flagship CKOC and Winnipeg's CFRW (replacing game coverage on CJOB), carried the Grey Cup on radio across Canada. Those stations were distributed online and to mobile devices via iHeartRadio. The game was watched by an average of 3.9 million viewers, split between TSN and RDS. Nearly nine million Canadians watched some or all of the game. This represented a 19% increase in viewership over the 106th Grey Cup. Viewership on TSN's streaming platforms also increased 77% over the previous year. In the United States, the game attracted an audience of 109,000 viewers on ESPN2.
- The 106th Grey Cup in 2018 was televised in Canada by TSN (English) and RDS (French), and in the United States on ESPN2. For the first time, a Spanish-language telecast was provided by ESPN Latin America for ESPN3 in Mexico, with Aaron Soriano on play-by-play and the Toronto Argonauts' Frank Beltre on colour. The move came on the heels of a letter of intent between the CFL and Mexico's Liga de Fútbol Americano Profesional, which contained a proposal for partnerships between the two leagues and the possibility of a CFL game played in Mexico as early as 2020.
- The 105th Grey Cup in 2017 was watched by an average of 4.3 million viewers, with viewership peaking at nearly six million during the Argos' comeback in the fourth quarter. Nearly a third of the population of Canada watched part of the game. The game saw a ten percent increase in viewership over the previous year and a fifty-eight percent increase in viewership in the Toronto/Hamilton market. Overall, the 105th Grey Cup was the most watched Grey Cup since 2013.
- The 104th Grey Cup in 2016 was watched by an average of 3.9 million Canadians, with the average viewership peaking at 5.7 million during the Stampeders' fourth quarter comeback and overtime. The day following the game, the CFL announced the game saw increases in viewership over the previous year, including a 15% increase in viewers from the 18–34 male demographic. This was also the first Grey Cup game broadcast in 4k on TSN's newly created TSN 4k channel. The game also saw significant growth in online viewership and in coverage on social media sites such as Twitter. Overall, approximately ten million Canadians watched at least part of the game. According to the CFL, approximately 2.5 million viewers in the United States watched the Grey Cup, either on ESPN 2 or through livestreaming.
- In Canada, the English broadcast of the 101st Grey Cup in 2013 was presented on TSN, while the French language broadcast was handled by its sister station, broadcast in Canada by RDS. In the United States, the game was broadcast on the NBC Sports Network (NBCSN, simulcasting the TSN feed). On the radio, the game was covered by TSN Radio, AM900 CHML, CKRM and SiriusXM. Overall, the game was seen by 11.5 million viewers, or approximately 1 in 3 Canadians, with an average viewership of 4.5 million.
- The 100th Grey Cup in 2012 was broadcast in Canada on TSN in English and its sister station, RDS, in French. TSN commissioned a documentary series, Engraved on a Nation, to commemorate the centennial. The game was televised in the United States by NBCSN. With an average of 5.5 million viewers for TSN, it was the most watched Grey Cup game of all-time on English television. Including RDS, viewership averaged 5.8 million, while over 13 million Canadians watched at least part of the contest. While these totals represented a 28% increase over the year before, both fell short of the all-time records of 6.1 million viewers on average and 14 million total set in the 97th Grey Cup in 2009. The half-time show averaged 6.1 million viewers.
- In Canada, the 99th Grey Cup in 2011 was televised in high-definition by both TSN (English) and RDS (French). TSN play-by-play was provided by Chris Cuthbert, while Glen Suitor provided colour commentary. Play-by-play man Denis Casavant and colour commentator Pierre Vercheval announced the game for RDS. The RDS broadcast team also included Marc Labrecque, Mike Sutherland and Claude Mailhot. The game was watched on television by an average audience of 4.6 million people. Although this was down from the 6.04 million viewers that the 98th Grey Cup drew, it was still the highest-rated television program of the week in Canada. In the Vancouver market, over half the population watched the game, and more than 11 million Canadians overall watched some or all of the broadcast on TSN and RDS.
- In Canada, the 98th Grey Cup in 2010 was televised in high-definition by both TSN (English) and RDS (French). TSN play-by-play was provided by Chris Cuthbert, while Glen Suitor provided colour commentary. On RDS the game was announced by play-by-play man Denis Casavant and colour commentator Pierre Vercheval. The RDS broadcast team also included commentary from Marc Labrecque, Mike Sutherland and Claude Mailhot. TSN aired Grey Cup-related programs throughout the week leading up to the 98th Grey Cup, culminating with extensive coverage on Grey Cup Saturday and TSN's broadcast of the 46th Vanier Cup. TSN's Grey Cup Sunday coverage began at 1 pm ET with a Grey Cup pre-game show hosted by the regular CFL on TSN panel of Dave Randorf, Jock Climie, Matt Dunigan and Chris Schultz. After the game, the panel hosted the post-game show, which was followed by a special post-game edition of SportsCentre. The game was watched on television by 6.04 million Canadians, making it the second most-watched game in Grey Cup history, slightly behind the previous year's game, which drew 6.1 million viewers. BBM Canada reported that the audience for the game peaked at 7.6 million viewers and that, overall, close to 14 million Canadians—or about 42% of Canada's population—tuned in to watch some or all of the broadcast on TSN and RDS. RDS' French-language broadcast drew an average audience of 1.1 million viewers.

=== 2000s ===
Year	Network	Play-by-play	Colour commentator(s)	Sideline reporters	Pregame host	Pregame analysts
2009	TSN	Chris Cuthbert	Glen Suitor	Sara Orlesky and Farhan Lalji	Dave Randorf and Brian Williams	Jock Climie, Matt Dunigan, and Chris Schultz
2008	TSN	Chris Cuthbert	Glen Suitor	Sara Orlesky and Farhan Lalji	Dave Randorf and Brian Williams	Jock Climie, Matt Dunigan, and Chris Schultz
2007	CBC	Mark Lee	Chris Walby	Khari Jones, Steve Armitage, and Brenda Irving	Elliotte Friedman	Daved Benefield, Khari Jones, and Greg Frers
2006	CBC	Mark Lee	Chris Walby	Darren Flutie, Steve Armitage, and Brenda Irving	Elliotte Friedman	Sean Millington, Khari Jones, and Greg Frers
2005	CBC	Mark Lee	Chris Walby	Steve Armitage and Elliotte Friedman	Brian Williams	Darren Flutie, Eric Tillman, and Greg Frers
2004	CBC	Chris Cuthbert	Chris Walby	Steve Armitage and Mark Lee	Brian Williams	Darren Flutie, Sean Millington, and Greg Frers
2003	CBC	Chris Cuthbert	Chris Walby	Steve Armitage and Mark Lee	Brian Williams	Darren Flutie, Sean Millington, and Greg Frers
2002	CBC	Chris Cuthbert	Chris Walby	Steve Armitage and Mark Lee	Brian Williams	Eric Tillman, Danny McManus, and Glen Suitor
2001	CBC	Chris Cuthbert	Chris Walby	Steve Armitage and Scott Russell	Brian Williams	Mike Clemons, Glen Suitor, and Danny Barrett
2000	CBC	Chris Cuthbert	Chris Walby	Steve Armitage and Scott Russell	Brian Williams and Mark Lee	Mike Clemons and Glen Suitor

==== Notes ====
- The 96th Grey Cup in 2008 was the first Grey Cup not to be broadcast on CBC Television since they started broadcasting the Grey Cup in 1952. In Canada, the game was telecast solely on the cable channel TSN and its French-language sister network RDS. Internationally, both Versus, telecasting in the United States, and Canadian Forces Radio and Television, broadcasting to Canadian forces internationally, used the TSN feed and graphics. The game was available in HD on both TSN HD and RDS HD and shown in HD in the United States on Voom HD Networks's WorldSport. It was also seen online at ESPN360.com.
- The 95th Grey Cup in 2007 was viewed by approximately 3.337 million viewers on CBC television, up from 3.202 million the previous year. This was the last Grey Cup and CFL game broadcast by CBC, as TSN became the exclusive TV home for the CFL the following season.
- The 93rd Grey Cup in 2005 was the first Grey Cup to be presented in high-definition television.

=== 1990s ===
Year	Network	Play-by-play	Colour commentator(s)	Sideline reporters	Pregame host	Pregame analysts
1999	CBC	Chris Cuthbert	Chris Walby	Steve Armitage and Brenda Irving	Brian Williams and Mark Lee	Mike Clemons and Glen Suitor
1998	CBC	Chris Cuthbert	Chris Walby	Steve Armitage, Glen Suitor and Caroline Corey	Brian Williams and Mark Lee	Mike Clemons
1997	CBC	Chris Cuthbert	David Archer	Steve Armitage and Caroline Corey	Brian Williams and Mark Lee	Chris Walby and Glen Suitor
1996	CBC	Chris Cuthbert	James Curry and David Archer	Steve Armitage and Mark Lee	Brian Williams and Scott Oake	Kent Austin and Dave Sapunjis
1995	CBC	Don Wittman	Danny Kepley	Steve Armitage and Mark Lee	Brian Williams and Scott Oake	Ron Lancaster and James Curry
1994	CBC	Don Wittman	James Curry and Danny Kepley	Steve Armitage and Mark Lee	Brian Williams and Scott Oake	Ron Lancaster and Matt Dunigan
1993	CBC	Don Wittman	James Curry and Danny Kepley	Chris Cuthbert and Mark Lee	Brian Williams and Scott Oake	Doug Flutie and Dave Ritchie
1992	CBC	Don Wittman	Joe Galat	Chris Cuthbert	Brian Williams and Scott Oake	Kent Austin and Ron Lancaster
1991	CBC	Don Wittman	Joe Galat	Steve Armitage	Brian Williams and Scott Oake	Ron Lancaster and Danny Kepley
1990	CBC	Don Wittman	Ron Lancaster	Steve Armitage	Brian Williams and Scott Oake	Kent Austin and Don Moen
1990	CFN	Bob Irving	Neil Lumsden and Nick Bastaja		Dave Hodge	Mike Clemons

==== Notes ====
- With the shutdown of the league-run Canadian Football Network broadcast service after the end of the previous season, the 79th Grey Cup in 1991 was the first Grey Cup game to be broadcast on only one network since 1960, CBC Television. All Grey Cup games since have been broadcast on CBC or, since 2008, TSN.
  - Raghib 'Rocket' Ismail's 87 yard kickoff return is a Grey Cup record for kickoffs. Surprisingly, Ismail (who went on to a long NFL career) admitted in a recent television interview on the CBC that he had not seen a replay of the return since the game (some 15 years earlier). The CBC provided him with a DVD copy of the game.
- The 78th Grey Cup in 1990 was the last game broadcast by the CFL's league-run syndication broadcast service, the Canadian Football Network, which started in 1987 and was shut down after this game. All CFL playoff and Grey Cup games would be exclusively broadcast on CBC Television starting the next year, continuing until 2007, when TSN gained exclusive broadcast rights to all CFL games, including the Grey Cup.

=== 1980s ===
Year	Network	Play-by-play	Colour commentator(s)	Sideline reporters	Pregame host	Pregame analysts
1989	CBC	Don Wittman	Ron Lancaster	Steve Armitage	Brian Williams and Scott Oake	Don Moen and Matt Dunigan
1989	CFN	Dave Hodge	Neil Lumsden and Nick Bastaja	Tom Larscheid	Bob Irving	Dan Kepley and Mike Riley
1988	CBC	Don Wittman	Ron Lancaster	Steve Armitage	Brian Williams and Scott Oake	John Gregory and Bob O'Billovich
1988	CFN	Bob Irving	Neil Lumsden		Dave Hodge	Joe Faragalli and Ian Beckstead
1987	CBC	Don Wittman	Ron Lancaster	Steve Armitage	Brian Williams and Scott Oake	Larry Donovan and Mike Riley
1987	CFN	Dave Hodge	Neil Lumsden		Bob Irving	Lary Kuharich and Jan Carinci
1986	CBC	Pat Marsden (first half); Don Wittman (second half)	Frank Rigney and Leif Pettersen (first half); Ron Lancaster and Chuck Ealey (second half)	Al McCann (Edmonton bench); Steve Armitage (Hamilton bench)	Brian Williams (CBC); Dan Matheson (CTV)	
1986	CTV	Pat Marsden (first half); Don Wittman (second half)	Frank Rigney and Leif Pettersen (first half); Ron Lancaster and Chuck Ealey (second half)	Al McCann (Edmonton bench); Steve Armitage (Hamilton bench)	Brian Williams (CBC); Dan Matheson (CTV)	
1985	CBC	Pat Marsden (first half); Don Wittman (second half)	Frank Rigney and Leif Pettersen (first half); Ron Lancaster and Leo Cahill (second half)	Bill Stephenson (BC bench); Steve Armitage (Hamilton bench)	Brian Williams	
1985	CTV	Pat Marsden (first half); Don Wittman (second half)	Frank Rigney and Leif Pettersen (first half); Ron Lancaster and Leo Cahill (second half)	Bill Stephenson (BC bench); Steve Armitage (Hamilton bench)	Brian Williams	
1984	CBC	Pat Marsden (first half); Don Wittman (second half)	Frank Rigney and Leif Pettersen (first half); Ron Lancaster and Leo Cahill (second half)	Al McCann (Winnipeg bench); Ernie Afaganis (Hamilton bench)	Brian Williams	
1984	CTV	Pat Marsden (first half); Don Wittman (second half)	Frank Rigney and Leif Pettersen (first half); Ron Lancaster and Leo Cahill (second half)	Al McCann (Winnipeg bench); Ernie Afaganis (Hamilton bench)	Brian Williams	
1983	CBC	Pat Marsden (first half); Don Wittman (second half)	Frank Rigney and Leif Pettersen (first half); Ron Lancaster and Leo Cahill (second half)	Brian Williams and Al McCann	John Wells	
1983	CTV	Pat Marsden (first half); Don Wittman (second half)	Frank Rigney and Leif Pettersen (first half); Ron Lancaster and Leo Cahill (second half)	Brian Williams and Al McCann	John Wells	
1982	CBC	Pat Marsden (first half); Don Wittman (second half)	Frank Rigney and Leif Pettersen (first half); Ron Lancaster and Leo Cahill (second half)		John Wells	
1982	CTV	Pat Marsden (first half); Don Wittman (second half)	Frank Rigney and Leif Pettersen (first half); Ron Lancaster and Leo Cahill (second half)		John Wells	
1981	CBC	Pat Marsden (first half); Don Wittman (second half)	Frank Rigney and Mike Wadsworth (first half); Ron Lancaster and Leo Cahill (second half)		John Wells	
1981	CTV	Pat Marsden (first half); Don Wittman (second half)	Frank Rigney and Mike Wadsworth (first half); Ron Lancaster and Leo Cahill (second half)		John Wells	
1980	CBC	Pat Marsden (first half); Don Chevrier (second half)	Frank Rigney and Mike Wadsworth (first half); Russ Jackson (second half)		John Wells	
1980	CTV	Pat Marsden (first half); Don Chevrier (second half)	Frank Rigney and Mike Wadsworth (first half); Russ Jackson (second half)		John Wells	

==== Notes ====
- The 1982 Grey Cup broadcast drew the largest Canadian TV audience up to that time.
- For the 1986 Grey Cup, each network presented its own coverage.
- After the 1986 season, CTV dropped coverage of the CFL altogether. In response to this, the CFL formed its own syndicated network, called CFN (Canadian Football Network). CFN had completely separate coverage of the Grey Cup (when compared to CBC), utilizing its own production and commentators. From 1987–1989, a weekly CFN game telecast, including playoffs and the Grey Cup championship, aired in the United States on a tape-delay basis on ESPN.
  - The CFL operated the Canadian Football Network, a coalition of private broadcasters that shared league games and the Grey Cup with the CBC, from 1987 to 1990.

=== 1970s ===
Year	Network	Play-by-play	Colour commentator(s)	Sideline reporter(s)	Host
1979	CBC	Pat Marsden (first half); Don Chevrier (second half)	Frank Rigney and Mike Wadsworth (first half); Russ Jackson and Terry Evanshen (second half)	Tom McKee	Tom McKee and Bernie Pascall
1979	CTV	Pat Marsden (first half); Don Chevrier (second half)	Frank Rigney and Mike Wadsworth (first half); Russ Jackson and Terry Evanshen (second half)	Tom McKee	Tom McKee and Bernie Pascall
1978	CBC	Pat Marsden (first half); Don Chevrier (second half)	Frank Rigney and Mike Wadsworth (first half); Russ Jackson (second half)	Bill Stephenson; Don Wittman (second half)	Tom McKee
1978	CTV	Pat Marsden (first half); Don Chevrier (second half)	Frank Rigney and Mike Wadsworth (first half); Russ Jackson (second half)	Bill Stephenson; Don Wittman (second half)	Tom McKee
1977	CBC	Pat Marsden (first half); Don Chevrier (second half)	Frank Rigney and Mike Wadsworth (first half); Russ Jackson (second half)	Don Wittman	Tom McKee and Bernie Pascall
1977	CTV	Pat Marsden (first half); Don Chevrier (second half)	Frank Rigney and Mike Wadsworth (first half); Russ Jackson (second half)	Don Wittman	Tom McKee and Bernie Pascall
1976	CBC	Pat Marsden (first half); Don Chevrier (second half)	Mike Wadsworth (first half); Frank Rigney (second half)	Bill Stephenson (first half); Don Wittman (second half and postgame); Al McCann (postgame)	Ernie Afaganis (halftime and postgame); Bill Stephenson (postgame)
1976	CTV	Pat Marsden (first half); Don Chevrier (second half)	Mike Wadsworth (first half); Frank Rigney (second half)	Bill Stephenson (first half); Don Wittman (second half and postgame); Al McCann (postgame)	Ernie Afaganis (halftime and postgame); Bill Stephenson (postgame)
1975	CBC	Don Wittman (first half); Pat Marsden (second half)	Frank Rigney (first half); Mike Wadsworth (second half)	Bill Stephenson (first half); Don Chevrier (second half)	Ernie Afaganis and Bernie Pascall
1975	CTV	Don Wittman (first half); Pat Marsden (second half)	Frank Rigney (first half); Mike Wadsworth (second half)	Bill Stephenson (first half); Don Chevrier (second half)	Ernie Afaganis and Bernie Pascall
1974	CBC	Don Wittman (first half); Pat Marsden (second half)	Frank Rigney (first half); Wally Gabler (second half)	Tom McKee and Bernie Pascall	Tom McKee
1974	CTV	Don Wittman (first half); Pat Marsden (second half)	Frank Rigney (first half); Wally Gabler (second half)		
1973	CBC	Don Chevrier (first half); Johnny Esaw (second half)	Russ Jackson (first half); Dick Shatto (second half)	Tom McKee	
1973	CTV	Don Chevrier (first half); Johnny Esaw (second half)	Russ Jackson (first half); Dick Shatto (second half)	Tom McKee	
1972	CBC	Don Chevrier (first half); Johnny Esaw (second half)	Russ Jackson (first half); Dick Shatto (second half)	Tom McKee	
1972	CTV	Don Chevrier (first half); Johnny Esaw (second half)	Russ Jackson (first half); Dick Shatto (second half)	Tom McKee	
1971	CBC	Johnny Esaw (first half); Don Chevrier (second half)	Dick Shatto (first half); Russ Jackson (second half)	Tom McKee	
1971	CTV	Johnny Esaw (first half); Don Chevrier (second half)	Dick Shatto (first half); Russ Jackson (second half)	Tom McKee	
1970	CBC	Johnny Esaw	Dick Shatto	Tom McKee	Pat Marsden and Bernie Pascall
1970	CTV	Johnny Esaw	Dick Shatto	Tom McKee	Pat Marsden and Bernie Pascall

==== Notes ====
- From 1971–1986, CBC and CTV fully pooled their commentary teams for the game. The first set of commentators listed described the first half of the game, and the second set described the rest of the game.

=== 1960s ===
Year	Network	Play-by-play	Colour commentator(s)	Sideline reporters	Pregame host	Pregame analysts
1969	CBC	Don Chevrier		Ernie Afaganis	Tom McKee	
1969	CTV	Don Chevrier		Ernie Afaganis	Tom McKee	
1968	CBC	Johnny Esaw	Bill Bewley	Pat Marsden and Tom McKee	Gene Filipski	
1968	CTV	Johnny Esaw	Bill Bewley	Pat Marsden and Tom McKee	Gene Filipski	
1967	CBC	Johnny Esaw	Gene Filipski	Al McCann, John F. Bassett, and Don Wittman	Ken Newans	
1967	CTV	Johnny Esaw	Gene Filipski	Al McCann, John F. Bassett, and Don Wittman	Ken Newans	
1966	CBC	Fred Sgambati	Nobby Wirkowski	Ernie Afaganis		
1966	CTV	Fred Sgambati	Nobby Wirkowski	Ernie Afaganis		
1965	CBC	Johnny Esaw				
1965	CTV	Johnny Esaw				
1964	CBC	Don Wittman (1st half) Dan Kelly (2nd half)	Hugh McPherson	Frank Anderson		
1964	CTV	Don Wittman (1st half) Dan Kelly (2nd half)	Hugh McPherson	Frank Anderson		
1963	CBC	Don Wittman	Hugh McPherson	Frank Anderson		
1963	CTV	Don Wittman	Hugh McPherson	Frank Anderson		
1962	CBC	Johnny Esaw			Steve Douglas	Bernie Faloney
1962	CTV	Johnny Esaw			Steve Douglas	Bernie Faloney
1961	CBC	Don Wittman				
1960	CBC	Steve Douglas		Ted Reynolds		

==== Notes ====
- From 1962–1986, CBC and CTV simulcast the Grey Cup. For 1962, 1965, 1967, 1968 and 1970, CTV's commentators were used for the dual network telecast. Meanwhile, in 1963, 1966 and 1969, CBC's announcers were provided.
  - The CBC carried the first national telecasts exclusively, but the CTV Television Network purchased rights to the 1962 game. The move sparked concern across Canada as the newly formed network was not yet available in many parts of the country. The debate over whether an "event of national interest" should be broadcast by the publicly funded CBC or private broadcasters reached the floor of Parliament as members of the federal government weighed in. It was decided that both networks would carry the game. The two networks continued with the simulcast arrangement until 1986 when CTV ceased its coverage.
- The 1962 Grey Cup was the first CFL contest to be broadcast by an American TV network, when ABC's Wide World of Sports carried the game in the United States. (The game, which was shown live on the CBC starting at 12:30pm in Toronto, was shown on ABC via tape delay beginning at 4:00 Eastern time. The end of the contest the next day was carried by the CBC but not ABC.) It would be the only CFL game to air on a US network until 1980, when the nascent ESPN cable network acquired American broadcast rights to the league. The first CFL game seen on ESPN was on July 9, 1980, when the Montreal defeated Toronto, 18-11.

=== 1950s ===
Year	Network	Play-by-play	Colour commentator	Sideline reporter	Pregame host	Pregame analyst(s)
1959	CBC	Steve Douglas	Ted Reynolds	Ward Cornell		
1958	CBC	Steve Douglas	Ted Reynolds	Bob Moir		
1957	CBC	Steve Douglas (Quarters 2 & 4); Ted Reynolds (Quarters 1 & 3)			Larry O'Brien and Byng Whitteker	Frank Clair, Kaye Vaughan, Pop Ivy, and Jackie Parker
1956	CBC	Steve Douglas (Quarters 2 & 4); Ted Reynolds (Quarters 1 & 3)			Doug Maxwell	
1955	CBC	Steve Douglas (Quarters 2 & 4); Bill Stephenson (Quarters 1 & 3)			Hal Walker	Annis Stukus
1954	CBC	Steve Douglas (Quarters 1 & 4); Jack Wells (Quarters 2 & 3)			Dave Price	
1953	CBC	Steve Douglas				
1952	CBC	Norm Marshall	Larry O'Brien		Annis Stukus	

==== Notes ====
- The 45th Grey Cup in 1957 was the first Grey Cup game to be covered on coast-to-coast television.
- Canadian television was in its infancy in 1952 when Toronto's CBLT paid $7,500 for the rights to carry the first televised broadcast of a Grey Cup game. Within two years, it was estimated that 80 percent of the nation's 900,000 television sets were tuned into the game, even though the first national telecast did not occur until 1957. The Grey Cup continues to be one of Canada's most-viewed sporting events.
  - The 40th Grey Cup in 1952 was the first Grey Cup match to be televised as CBC Television's Toronto flagship station, CBLT, paid CAD$7,500 to the Canadian Rugby Union for the rights to broadcast the game. The broadcast was only available locally on CBLT which had only begun broadcasts less than three months earlier. Live network television connections with other CBC stations were not available until 1953, although kinescope films of the game were produced for movie theatres and other television stations. A technical failure prevented viewers from seeing 29 minutes of the game video. This interrupted the telecast during much of the third quarter, although commentator audio was still transmitted. Images were restored into the final quarter when CBC technicians repaired the link at the CBC's tower which received the feed from Varsity Stadium. The reported cause of the transmission relay failure was a vacuum tube worth $1.85. Despite this setback, this inaugural Grey Cup broadcast was reported to have had the most viewers of any Canadian television production to that date.

=== United States ===
- NBC: 1954 – The predecessor to the CFL's East Division, the IRFU, had a television contract with NBC in 1954 that provided far more coverage than the NFL's existing contract with DuMont. NBC aired games on Saturday afternoons, competing against college football broadcasts on CBS and ABC. The revenue from the contract allowed the IRFU to directly compete against the NFL for players in the late 1950s, setting up a series of CFL games in the United States beginning in 1958 and a series of interleague exhibitions beginning in 1959. Interest in the CFL in the United States faded dramatically after the debut of the American Football League in 1960.
- ABC: 1962 on ABC's Wide World of Sports
- Syndicated: 1966 (WNJU, WPHL-TV, KTLA)
- Syndicated: 1972–1974 (WOR, WKGB, KTTV, WFLD, KBCW, WTAF, KMPH, WKEF, KFIZ-TV, WVTV, KCOP)
- SCORE: 1985 – FNN-SCORE is unrelated to the Canadian "The Score".
- ESPN: 1980–1984, 1986–1989, 2016–2022 - ESPN host Chris Berman became a fan of the game in the early days of ESPN, when the network used to air CFL games, and continues to cover the Canadian league on-air.
- SportsChannel America: 1990–1993 – SportsChannel America used the CBC Television and CFN feeds.
- ESPN2: 1994–1997, 2014–2022 – Beginning in 1994, with now four American-based teams in the league, ESPN reached a deal with the league to produce and air two games per week and all post-season games on its fledgling ESPN2. They also put some games on the main network to fill broadcast time vacated by the 1994–95 Major League Baseball strike. The 1994 and 1995 Grey Cups were shown live on ESPN2 and then re-aired on ESPN the following day, leading into the network's Monday Night Countdown show. ESPN's on-air talent included a mix of the network's American football broadcasters and established CFL broadcasters from Canada. Most of the American-based teams also had deals with local carriers to show games that were not covered in the national package. Though there were no US teams in the league after 1995, ESPN2 continued showing games until 1997.
- Regional sports networks and America One: 2001–2007, 2009–2010 – America One held CFL broadcast rights in the United States from 2004 to 2009 and aired a majority of the league's games. Until the 2007 season, America One syndicated CFL games to regional sports networks like Altitude, NESN, and MASN; these were discontinued in 2008, mainly because America One and the CFL were able to reach a deal only days before the season began, not allowing the network time to establish agreements with individual RSNs. The Grey Cup aired on Versus on November 22, 2008, with a replay the next day on America One. From 2006 through the 2008 season, Friday Night Football was carried exclusively on World Sport HD in the United States; however, due to the January 2009 shutdown of that channel's parent company, Voom HD Networks, America One reclaimed those rights.
- Versus: 2008
- ESPN3: 2009–2022 – On July 1, 2010, NFL Network began airing live Canadian Football League games simulcast from Canada's TSN. NFL Network aired Thursday games, three Saturday games in July, and then Friday night games beginning again in September (after ArenaBowl XXIII). NFL Network didn't air CFL games in August due to a large number of NFL preseason broadcasts. In addition, NFL Network didn't show any playoff games, including the Grey Cup championship, as those games are all played on Sundays opposite the NFL. Those games were instead broadcast on the online service ESPN3, a sister network to TSN. NFL Network announced it would not renew its deal with the CFL on May 25, 2012.
- NBC Sports Network: 2012–2013
- ESPNEWS: 2016–2022
- CBS Sports Network: 2023–present

==== 1990s ====
Year	Network	Play-by-play	Colour commentator	Sideline reporter	Pregame host	Pregame analyst
1997	ESPN2	Rob Faulds	Danny Kepley			
1996	ESPN2	Gord Miller	Danny Kepley	Miles Gorrell		
1995	ESPN2	Gus Johnson	Mike Mayock			
1994	ESPN2	Gus Johnson	Mike Mayock		Chris Cuthbert	Doug Flutie

== Radio ==
The Grey Cup game was first broadcast on radio in 1928. CBC Radio carried radio coverage of the game for 51 years until 1986, when a network of private broadcasters took over.

=== 2020s ===
Year	Network	Play-by-play	Colour commentator(s)	Pregame host
2026	TSN Radio	Dustin Nielson	Paul LaPolice	Aaron Korolnek
2025	TSN Radio	Dustin Nielson	Paul LaPolice	Aaron Korolnek
2024	TSN Radio	Dustin Nielson	Mike Benevides	Aaron Korolnek
2023	TSN Radio	Dustin Nielson	Marshall Ferguson	Aaron Korolnek
2022	No specific radio broadcast – the TSN TV coverage was broadcast on TSN Radio			
2021	TSN Radio	Dustin Nielson	Natey Adjei	Aaron Korolnek

=== 2010s ===
Year	Network	Play-by-play	Colour commentator(s)	Pregame host
2019	TSN Radio	Rod Black	Giulio Caravatta	
2018	TSN Radio	Rod Black	Giulio Caravatta	
2017	TSN Radio	Rod Black	Giulio Caravatta	
2016	TSN Radio	Rod Black	Giulio Caravatta	
2015	TSN Radio	Rod Black	Giulio Caravatta	
2014	TSN Radio	Rod Black	Giulio Caravatta	
2013	TSN Radio	Rod Black	Duane Forde	
2012	TSN Radio	Rod Black	Duane Forde	
2011	Bell Media Radio	Bob Irving (First Half); Rick Ball (Second Half)	Chris Burns (First Half); Giulio Caravatta (Second Half)	
2010	Corus Radio	Rick Moffat (First Half); Rod Pedersen (Second Half)	Carm Carteri and Ed Philion	Bryan Hall and Bob Irving

=== 2000s ===
Year	Network	Play-by-play	Colour commentator(s)	Sideline reporters
2009	Corus Radio	Rod Pedersen (First Half); Rick Moffat (Second Half)	Carm Carteri and Ed Philion	Rick Moffat (First Half); Rod Pedersen (Second Half)
2008	The Fan	Mark Stephen and Rick Moffat	Greg Peterson and Ed Philion	
2007	The Fan	Rod Pedersen	Carm Carteri	
2006	Corus Radio	Rick Ball and Rick Moffat	Giulio Caravatta and Tony Proudfoot	
2005	Corus Radio	Mark Stephen	John Farlinger and Tony Proudfoot	
2004	Corus Radio	Mark Stephen	Pete Martin and Giulio Caravatta	
2002	The Team	Dave Schreiber	Jeff Avery	
2001	The Team	Dave Schreiber	Jeff Avery	

==== Notes ====
- CFL teams had local broadcast contracts with terrestrial radio stations for regular season and playoff games, while The Fan Radio Network (Rogers Communications) owned the rights to the Grey Cup. In 2006, Sirius Satellite Radio gained exclusive rights for North American CFL satellite radio broadcasts and broadcast 25 CFL games per season, including the Grey Cup, through 2008.

=== 1990s ===
Year	Network	Play-by-play	Colour commentator(s)	Sideline reporter(s)	Pregame host
1999	Corus Radio	Bob Hooper and Mark Stephen	Russ Jackson and Greg Peterson		
1998	Corus Radio	Bob Hooper and Mark Stephen	Russ Jackson and Greg Peterson		
1997	Corus Radio	Bob Bratina and Geoff Currier	Pete Martin and Carm Carteri		
1996	TSN Radio	John Wells	Leif Pettersen and Glen Suitor		
1995	TSN Radio	John Wells	Leif Pettersen and Glen Suitor	Darren Dutchyshen and Greg Peterson	
1994	TSN Radio	John Wells	Leif Pettersen	Gord Miller	
1993	Telemedia	David Archer			
1992	Ron Hewat Enterprises	J.P. McConnell	Bob Irving and Dave Siler	Dave Schrieber	Bill Stephenson

=== 1970s ===
The 1978 and 1979 Grey Cups were broadcast to the United States by Moon Radio Network, Inc., of Pittsburgh, Pennsylvania. For both broadcasts, Harold Johnson of Charlotte, North Carolina, was the play-by-play announcer, and Russell Moon of Pittsburgh, Pennsylvania, was the analyst. The 1978 halftime guest was future Hall of Famer Terry Evanshen, then of the Toronto Argonauts. The 1978 broadcast had 9 affiliates, and the 1979 broadcast had 27 affiliates.

== See also ==
- Grey Cup#Broadcasting
- Canadian Football League#Broadcasting
