= 74th Grey Cup =

1986 Canadian Football championship game

Hamilton Tiger-Cats	Edmonton Eskimos
(9–8–1)	(13–4–1)
39	15
Head coach: Al Bruno	Head coach: Jackie Parker
	1	2	3	4	Total
Hamilton Tiger-Cats	17	12	7	3	39
Edmonton Eskimos	0	0	7	8	15
- Date: November 30, 1986
- Stadium: BC Place Stadium
- Location: Vancouver
- Most Valuable Player: Offence: Mike Kerrigan, QB (Tiger-Cats); Defence: Grover Covington, DE (Tiger-Cats)
- Most Valuable Canadian: Paul Osbaldiston, K/P (Tiger-Cats)
- National anthem: Mike Reno
- Referee: Jake Ireland
- Attendance: 59,621

Broadcasters
- Network: CBC, CTV, SRC
- Announcers: CBC: Don Wittman, Ron Lancaster, Chuck Ealey, Brian Williams, Steve Armitage CTV: Pat Marsden, Leif Pettersen, Frank Rigney, Al McCann

The 74th Grey Cup was the 1986 Canadian Football League championship game that was played at BC Place Stadium in Vancouver, between the Hamilton Tiger-Cats and the Edmonton Eskimos. The Tiger-Cats unexpectedly dominated the Eskimos 39–15.

== Game summary ==
Hamilton Tiger-Cats - (39) TDs, Steve Stapler, Jim Rockford, Ron Ingram; FGs, Paul Osbaldiston (6); cons., Osbaldiston (3).

Edmonton Eskimos - (15) TDs, - Damon Allen, Brian Kelly; 2 pt-con., Damon Allen; cons., Tom Dixon.

After losing the previous two Grey Cups, the Hamilton Tiger-Cats defeated the Edmonton Eskimos in a performance that exceeded expectations.

Hamilton's defence, which was led by Grover Covington and Ben Zambiasi, sacked Edmonton quarterbacks' Matt Dunigan and Damon Allen a total of 10 times. They also forced eight turnovers to tie a Grey Cup record.

Hamilton jumped out to a 29-0 lead at halftime. They got it going early when Covington forced a Dunigan fumble, the ball recovered by Leo Ezerins. This set up quarterback Mike Kerrigan's 35-yard touchdown pass to Steve Stapler. The game was just 1:35 old. The Tiger-Cats then got a big play from their special teams when Mark Streeter blocked Tom Dixon's punt attempt, which Jim Rockford recovered for another touchdown.

Hamilton then rode the boot of kicker Paul Osbaldiston, who kicked five of his record-tying six field goals in the first 30 minutes, two of which came off turnovers; one on Howard Fields' interception off Allen, and another on a Dunigan fumble forced by Covington. Edmonton's offence produced minus-one yard in offence in the first 30 minutes.

The Tiger-Cats continued their assault in the second half, when Kerrigan hit Ron Ingram with a 44-yard touchdown pass.

The Eskimos finally got on the scoreboard late in the third quarter courtesy of a blocked punt by Larry Wruck which Craig Shaffer recovered at the Hamilton 37. Quarterback Matt Dunigan got the Eskimos to six yards from the goal line, and backup Damon Allen ran it in from there. The Eskimos would add another major in the fourth quarter, but by then it was too late. Allen hit Brian Kelly with a 13-yard touchdown pass then ran it in for a two-point convert.

Osbaldiston added his sixth field goal, a 47-yarder in the game's final minute on what was an already decisive Grey Cup win.

== Trivia ==
The only other time the Edmonton Eskimos and the Hamilton Tiger-Cats had met in the Grey Cup was the 68th Grey Cup in 1980, which was also lopsided, with Edmonton winning 48 to 10.

Paul Osbaldiston's (the Grey Cup Most Valuable Canadian) six field goals tied Montreal Alouettes' Don Sweet's record, set in 1977.

It was Hamilton's first Grey Cup title since 1972, and their first win over the Eskimos since 1977. The Ticats entered the game as 12-point underdogs.

Grover Covington finished the game with three sacks. Ben Zambiasi recovered two fumbles, had one quarterback sack and six tackles. Both have since been inducted into the Canadian Football Hall of Fame.

It was Al Bruno's second Grey Cup triumph, and his first (and only title) as a head coach. Bruno won one as a player with the 1952 Toronto Argonauts.

This was the only professional sports championship of any sort won by a team under the sole ownership of Harold Ballard, who is better remembered for his controversial (and, at least so far as on-ice results are concerned, largely unsuccessful) ownership of the Toronto Maple Leafs. However, Ballard was part owner of the Leafs when they won their four most recent Stanley Cups in the 1960s. He is one of seven individuals with their names engraved on both the Grey Cup and the Stanley Cup.

This was the last Grey Cup to use the dual CBC/CTV commentator sets (with one network's crew calling one half, and the other's calling the other half), a practice that dated back to 1971. CTV ceased airing CFL games after this game and season (the CTV network ended a 24-year association with the league); in CTV's place came the Canadian Football Network, a syndication service run by the CFL itself, which operated from 1987–90 and aired the Grey Cup, but with their own commentator sets calling the games in their entirety separately from the CBC. CTV began airing Sunday afternoon NFL games in 1987, and would return to the Grey Cup in 2024.

On the blocked punt, Jim Rockford ripped the seat of his pants rolling into the end zone to score. He left the field and went to the locker room to change.

== 1986 CFL Playoffs ==
=== West Division ===
- Semi-final (November 16 @ Vancouver, British Columbia) BC Lions 21-14 Winnipeg Blue Bombers
- Semi-final (November 16 @ Edmonton, Alberta) Edmonton Eskimos 27-18 Calgary Stampeders
- Final (November 23 @ Edmonton, Alberta) Edmonton Eskimos 41-5 BC Lions

=== East Division ===
- Final - Game 1 (November 16 @ Hamilton, Ontario) Toronto Argonauts 31-17 Hamilton Tiger-Cats
- Final - Game 2 (November 23 @ Toronto, Ontario) Hamilton Tiger-Cats 42-25 Toronto Argonauts
- Hamilton won their 2 game total-point series against Toronto by outscoring them 59-56. The Tiger-Cats advanced to the Grey Cup Championship game.
