= 73rd Grey Cup =

1985 Canadian Football championship game

BC Lions	Hamilton Tiger-Cats
(13–3)	(8–8)
37	24
Head coach: Don Matthews	Head coach: Al Bruno
	1	2	3	4	Total
BC Lions	10	13	6	8	37
Hamilton Tiger-Cats	0	14	0	10	24
- Date: November 24, 1985
- Stadium: Olympic Stadium
- Location: Montreal
- Most Valuable Player: Offence: Roy Dewalt, QB (Lions); Defence: James "Quick" Parker, DE (Lions)
- Most Valuable Canadian: Lui Passaglia, K/P (Lions)
- National anthem: Luba
- Referee: Jake Ireland
- Attendance: 56,723

Broadcasters
- Network: CBC, CTV, SRC
- Announcers: CBC: Don Wittman, Ron Lancaster, Brian Williams, Steve Armitage CTV: Pat Marsden, Frank Rigney, Leif Pettersen, Bill Stephenson

The 73rd Grey Cup was the 1985 Canadian Football League championship game that was played at Olympic Stadium in Montreal, between the BC Lions and the Hamilton Tiger-Cats. The Lions easily handled the Tiger-Cats with a 37–24 victory.

== Game summary ==
BC Lions (37) - TDs, Ned Armour (2), Jim Sandusky; FGs, Lui Passaglia (5); cons., Passaglia (3); single, Passaglia.

Hamilton Tiger-Cats (24) - TDs, Ron Ingram, Johnny Shepherd, Steve Stapler; FGs, Bernie Ruoff; cons., Ruoff (3).

First quarter

BC - TD Armour 84 yard pass from Dewalt (Passaglia convert)
BC - FG Passaglia

Second quarter

BC - FG Passaglia
HAM - TD Ingram 35 yard pass from Hobart (Ruoff convert)
HAM - TD Shepherd 00 yard pass from Hobart (Ruoff convert)
BC - TD Armour 59 yard pass from Dewalt (Passaglia convert)
BC - FG Passaglia

Third quarter
BC - FG Passaglia
BC - FG Passaglia

Fourth quarter

HAM - FG Ruoff
BC - TD Sandusky 66 yard pass from Dewalt (Passaglia convert)
HAM - TD Stapler 35 yard pass from Hobart (Ruoff convert)
BC - Single Passaglia

The 1980s proved to be a decade of halting Grey Cup droughts.

The Toronto Argonauts ended 30 seasons of futility by recapturing the title in 1983. The Winnipeg Blue Bombers ended a 22-year drought without a national title the previous year.

It was the BC Lions turn in 1985. The Lions hadn't won a Grey Cup since their inaugural championship in 1964. Fittingly, their opponent in 1985 was the Hamilton Tiger-Cats, the same team they defeated for their first title. It was the second straight trip to the final for the Ticats.

The Lions jumped out to a quick start when five minutes in, quarterback Roy Dewalt and receiver Ned Armour combined on an 84-yard passing play for a major. BC added two field goals to take a 13-0 advantage early in the second quarter.

But much like they did the previous season, the Ticats made it interesting. Hamilton recovered a fumble by Lions running back Freddie Sims at the BC 50. It led to rookie quarterback Ken Hobart's 35-yard touchdown strike to Ron Ingram, cutting the margin to six.

Late in the opening half, Hobart broke free from the Hamilton 33 and utilized great blocking to get to the BC 15. Two plays later, Johnny Shepherd leaped high to snag a touchdown reception, giving the Ticats a 14-13 advantage with 1:35 remaining in the first half.

After failing to get a first down on their next possession, the Lions were forced to punt. Hamilton's Mitchell Price and Grover Covington bore down on B.C.'s Lui Passaglia in an attempt to block the kick and Passaglia, seeing the danger, wisely kept the ball and scrambled to his right, resulting in a first down.

BC then went for the dagger. Dewalt hit Armour again on a 59-yard touchdown play, giving the Lions the lead for good. Shortly after, James "Quick" Parker forced Hobart into a fumble, setting up a Passaglia 24-yard field goal. Instead of a one-point lead at halftime, Hamilton was in a hole 23-14.

The Lions never looked back. Passaglia booted another two field goals for five in the game, and Dewalt threw another big touchdown pass in the fourth quarter, a 66-yarder to Jim Sandusky.

Hobart would hit Steve Stapler for a 12-yard touchdown late in the game, but it was too little, too late, and the BC Lions won their second Grey Cup championship.

== Trivia ==
- The BC Lions won despite being without Mervyn Fernandez, the CFL's Most Outstanding Player Award winner, and all star running back Keyvan Jenkins, both lost to injuries.
- The entire 1985 BC Lions team were inducted into the BC Sports Hall of Fame in 2000.
- This was the final CFL game overall to be played with the 25-yard long endzone. Incidentally, the Lions' home stadium, BC Place, which introduced the shorter 20-yard long endzones in 1983, would have their shorter endzones be the new CFL standard the following season.

== 1985 CFL Playoffs ==
=== West Division ===
- Semi-final (November 10 @ Winnipeg, Manitoba) Winnipeg Blue Bombers 22-15 Edmonton Eskimos
- Final (November 17 @ Vancouver, British Columbia) BC Lions 42-22 Winnipeg Blue Bombers

=== East Division ===
- Semi-final (November 10 @ Montreal, Quebec) Montreal Concordes 30-20 Ottawa Rough Riders
- Final (November 17 @ Hamilton, Ontario) Hamilton Tiger-Cats 50-26 Montreal Concordes
