= CTV Sports =

Defunct sports division of the CTV Television Network

CTV Sports was the division of the CTV Television Network responsible for sports broadcasting. The division existed in its own right from 1961 to 2001; between 1998 and 2001, CTV Sports also operated a cable sports network, CTV Sportsnet, now owned by Rogers Media and known simply as Sportsnet.

Since CTV's purchase of the more established sports network TSN in 2001 (which in turn caused the sale of Sportsnet to Rogers), the network has assumed responsibility for CTV's remaining sports output. At the same time, the amount of in-house sports programming aired by CTV has been reduced to only encompass occasional, TSN-produced telecasts, such as Skate Canada events, and simulcasts of events from U.S. networks. As of 2014, the only sports broadcasts regularly aired by CTV and CTV 2 are simulcasts of National Football League games.

CTV has been incorporated into coverage of major international sporting events—such as FIFA World Cup tournaments, and the Olympic Games, which were most recently aired from 2010 to 2012 as part of a joint venture between Bell Media and Rogers Media.

== Current sports programs aired by CTV ==
The following events are currently specifically designated to air on CTV or CTV 2:

Football

- National Football League - Sunday afternoon (1:00pm ET and 4:05/4:25pm ET) local games, and playoffs including the Super Bowl (2007–present)
  - Prior to 2014, CTV only held rights to early afternoon games and the playoffs. In 2014, CTV acquired rights to late games (previously held by Rogers through Citytv and Sportsnet), and began airing additional games on CTV 2.
  - As of 2018, in simulcast with TSN channels, CTV 2 additionally simulcasts Thursday Night Football and Sunday Night Football when airing on Fox (2018-2021), CBS (2014-2017) Prime Video (2017-present) and NBC (2016-present) respectively.

Golf

- The Masters - in 2015, Bell Media acquired exclusive Canadian rights to The Masters, previously split between TSN and Global. CTV will air late-round coverage of the tournament.
- The Open Championship - NBC coverage of weekend rounds.
- PGA Tour - Weekend round coverage of selected events on CTV 2 beginning in 2019, in simulcast with TSN, and also replacing Global.

Soccer

- Select games from FIFA tournaments between 2015 and 2026 (with most games on TSN), including:
  - 2015 FIFA Women's World Cup
  - 2018 FIFA World Cup
  - 2019 FIFA Women's World Cup
  - 2022 FIFA World Cup
  - 2023 FIFA Women's World Cup
  - 2026 FIFA World Cup

== Former sports programs aired by CTV ==
Figure skating

- Skate Canada events, including Skate Canada International and the Canadian Figure Skating Championships (2011–12 to 2020–21 seasons)

Auto Racing

- Championship Auto Racing Teams (1979–2007)
- In 2012, CTV broadcast Formula One's Canadian Grand Prix.

Baseball

- Major League Baseball - Toronto Blue Jays (1981–1991)
  - In addition, Baton Broadcasting (through ONT / BBS) syndicated a package of Blue Jays games from 1992 to 1996, mostly to CTV affiliates. BBS was merged into CTV in late 1997, so these broadcasts might retroactively be considered CTV Sports broadcasts.
- Major League Baseball - Montreal Expos (1989–1993)
- Major League Baseball - All-Star Game, playoffs, and World Series (1981–1996)

Basketball

- National Basketball Association - Toronto Raptors/Vancouver Grizzlies/select national games/NBA All-Star Game/NBA Finals - (1995/1996-2001–2002 seasons)
  - Game 4 of the Raptors' Eastern semifinal series on May 5, 2019, aired in simulcast on CTV as a one-off broadcast.
  - Game 2 and 4 of the 2019 NBA Finals on CTV 2, and Game 6 on CTV, simulcasting the ABC telecast for simsub reasons (all three games aired on TSN as well, with the Raptors' main broadcast team).

Curling

- World Curling Championships (1991–1994)

Golf

- Canadian Open - (1962–2005)

Hockey

- National Hockey League - NHL on CTV (1972 playoffs, 1984/1985 & 1985–1986 seasons)
- Canada Cup - (1976, 1981, 1984, 1987, 1991)
- Memorial Cup - (1972–1989, 1999–2001)

Olympic Games

- Summer Olympic Games - 1980, 1992, 2012
- Winter Olympic Games - 1964, 1972, 1980, 1988, 1994, 2010
- Commonwealth Games - 1990, 1994, 1998, 2002, 2006, 2010

Soccer

- FIFA World Cup - 2006 (as part of consortium with Sportsnet)
- Select Saturday afternoon Major League Soccer games for the 2017 season until the 2022 season, as part of TSN's MLS broadcast contract.

In addition, other coverage of events with rights held by TSN have occasionally aired on CTV or CTV 2, or local stations thereof, if necessary due to scheduling conflicts on the TSN channels, such as Vancouver Whitecaps FC games (which aired locally on CTV Vancouver and CTV2 Vancouver Island).

== Notable personalities ==
- John F. Bassett
- Rod Black
- Don Chevrier
- Johnny Esaw
- Rob Faulds
- Dale Isaac
- Dan Kelly
- Tony Kubek
- Pat Marsden
- Dan Matheson
- Fergie Olver
- Brad Park
- Leif Pettersen
- Dave Randorf
- Leo Rautins
- Frank Rigney
- Ron Reusch
- Dick Shatto
- Bill Stephenson
- Barbara Underhill
- Mike Wadsworth
