= 45th Grey Cup =

1957 Canadian Football championship game

Hamilton Tiger-Cats	Winnipeg Blue Bombers
(10–4)	(12–4)
32	7
Head coach: Jim Trimble	Head coach: Bud Grant
	1	2	3	4	Total
Hamilton Tiger-Cats	13	0	0	19	32
Winnipeg Blue Bombers	0	0	0	7	7
- Date: November 30, 1957
- Stadium: Varsity Stadium
- Location: Toronto
- National anthem: None (a local marching band played God Save the Queen instead at the request of John Diefenbaker)
- Referee: Paul Dojack

Broadcasters
- Network: CBC
- Announcers: Steve Douglas, Ted Reynolds

The 45th Grey Cup was the Canadian Football Council's (CFC) championship game of the 1957 season, which was played on November 30, 1957. The Hamilton Tiger-Cats defeated the Winnipeg Blue Bombers 32–7 at Varsity Stadium in Toronto.

This was the first Grey Cup game to be covered on coast-to-coast television.

The game is famous for a play in which Hamilton defensive back Ray Bawel intercepted a Winnipeg pass and raced unopposed for an apparent touchdown. As he passed the Winnipeg bench, however, David Humphrey, a Toronto fan who was standing on the sidelines in front of the Winnipeg bench, put his foot out and tripped Bawel. After the officials huddled together for a while to discuss the situation not covered by the rulebook, referee Paul Dojack assessed a penalty of half the distance to the goal line as a sort of compromise. As it turned out, the incident had little effect as Hamilton scored on the ensuing drive and the game ended in a rout for Hamilton.
