= 103rd Grey Cup =

2015 Canadian Football championship game

| Ottawa Redblacks | Edmonton Eskimos |
|---|---|
| (12–6) | (14–4) |
| 20 | 26 |
| Head coach: Rick Campbell | Head coach: Chris Jones |
| | 1 | 2 | 3 | 4 | Total |
|---|---|---|---|---|---|
| Ottawa Redblacks | 13 | 3 | 3 | 1 | 20 |
| Edmonton Eskimos | 10 | 7 | 1 | 8 | 26 |
- Date: November 29, 2015
- Stadium: Investors Group Field
- Location: Winnipeg
- Most Valuable Player: Mike Reilly, QB (Eskimos)
- Most Valuable Canadian: Shamawd Chambers, WR (Eskimos)
- Favourite: Eskimos by 8.5
- National anthem: Bobby Bazini
- Coin toss: Jeffrey Orridge
- Referee: Al Bradbury
- Halftime show: Fall Out Boy
- Attendance: 36,634

Broadcasters
- Network: Canada (English): TSN; Canada (French): RDS; United States: ESPN2
- Announcers: Chris Cuthbert (play-by-play); Glen Suitor (analyst); Sara Orlesky (sideline reporter); Farhan Lalji (sideline reporter)
- Ratings: 4.3 million (average); 9.7 million (total)

The 103rd Grey Cup was a Canadian football game that was played on November 29, 2015, between the East Division champion Ottawa Redblacks and the West Division champion Edmonton Eskimos to decide the Canadian Football League (CFL) championship for the 2015 season. The game was played at Investors Group Field in Winnipeg, Manitoba. Shaw Communications was the presenting sponsor of the game; it was the first time that the Grey Cup had been sponsored. The Eskimos won the contest 26–20 to claim their 14th Grey Cup championship and first since 2005. Mike Reilly was named Most Valuable Player and Shamawd Chambers received the Dick Suderman Trophy as Most Valuable Canadian. It was the Eskimos' first Grey Cup win that did not involve Hugh Campbell in any capacity with the organization since the 1975 Grey Cup. This was Edmonton's last Grey Cup under the Eskimos name before the team name was changed to the Elks in 2020.

== Background ==
=== Host city ===
On March 24, 2014, news agencies reported that the game would be awarded to Winnipeg. Two days later on March 26, it was announced at a news conference that Investors Group Field in Winnipeg, Manitoba, will play host to the 103rd Grey Cup. It was the fourth time Winnipeg hosted a Grey Cup, the first time since 2006, and the first at the new Investors Group Field, which opened in 2013. Although the game was sold out, the attendance figure of 36,634 was the second lowest for a Grey Cup game since 1975.

=== Teams ===
==== Ottawa Redblacks ====
The Redblacks joined the CFL as an expansion team in 2014 and finished last in the league with a 2–16 record. Led by 40-year-old Henry Burris, who became the oldest quarterback to lead the CFL in passing yards (5,693), the Redblacks won the East Division title in 2015 with a 12–6 record. It marked the first time since the 1978 Ottawa Rough Riders that any team from Ottawa won a division title, while 12 wins in the season is the highest total of any Ottawa-based team in league history.

The Redblacks hosted the Hamilton Tiger-Cats in the East Division Final, for Ottawa's third consecutive match-up with the Ticats following two wins to end the regular season; in between, Hamilton had defeated the Toronto Argonauts, 25–22 in the East semi-final. The final was a closely contested game: Hamilton tied the game at 28–28 with 94 seconds remaining in the fourth quarter when quarterback Jeremiah Masoli, making only his second career playoff start, found Luke Tasker for a touchdown. On defence, Hamilton then had Ottawa pinned deep in their own territory on second down and 25 yards and hoped to recover the ball in the final minute to try for a game-winning field goal. Instead, Burris completed a 93-yard pass-and-run play to wide receiver Greg Ellingson, who scored the game-winning touchdown; The 35–28 final made the Redblacks the first Ottawa team to reach the championship game since the Rough Riders lost to Edmonton at the 69th Grey Cup in 1981.

==== Edmonton Eskimos ====
The Edmonton Eskimos finished their season with a record of 14–4 (their best performance since 1989, in which they went 16–2). The Calgary Stampeders, the defending Grey Cup champions, finished with the same record as the Eskimos after the regular season. However, Edmonton clinched first place in the division (and a playoff bye) by virtue of defeating Calgary in two of three regular-season contests. The two teams met again in the Western Final after Calgary defeated the BC Lions 35–9 in the Western Semi-Final. The Eskimos earned the right to represent the West in the Grey Cup game by virtue of a 45–31 victory against the Stampeders at Commonwealth Stadium in Edmonton. The 2015 Western Final game was the first time in CFL history where both teams came in with a 14–4 record in the regular season. Quarterback Mike Reilly was the offensive catalyst for the Eskimos as he passed for three touchdowns and ran for two more in the win. Edmonton reached its first championship game since winning the 93rd Grey Cup ten years earlier, making the 103rd Grey Cup the first of the modern era to be played by two teams that had not been in any of the preceding nine championship games.

== Entertainment ==
Country performer Dean Brody performed as part of pre-game festivities, while Québécois singer Bobby Bazini performed the national anthem. American rock band Fall Out Boy performed during halftime.

== Game summary ==
The Redblacks got out to a quick start as quarterback Henry Burris threw a pair of touchdowns in the first six minutes and nine seconds of the game: Ottawa completed a six-play opening drive for their first score, then recovered a fumble on the ensuing kickoff that led to a second, but unconverted, touchdown as the Redblacks took a 13–0 lead before Edmonton's offence had a chance to take the field. Edmonton answered with a field goal followed by a Mike Reilly touchdown pass to Adarius Bowman late in the first quarter. An Ottawa field goal and a single point for Edmonton following a missed field goal attempt moved Edmonton within five points, trailing 16–11 with a little under five minutes to play in the first half. A two-yard touchdown pass by Reilly to Akeem Shavers gave the Eskimos a 17–16 lead at half time.

The second half became what the Edmonton Journal called a "brutal defensive struggle". The Redblacks regained the lead as they turned a 42-yard pass interference penalty to Edmonton into a field goal, while Edmonton scored one point off a punt, and then missed a field goal late in the quarter as Sean Whyte's attempt hit the uprights and out; Ottawa led the game through three quarters by a 19–18 score. They added a point in the fourth quarter when kicker Chris Milo, attempting to pin Edmonton's offence deep in their own zone, instead kicked a wind-aided 72-yard punt into the end zone. The score then remained unchanged until the final minutes of the contest as Edmonton marched the ball 78 yards, aided significantly by consecutive pass interference penalties to Ottawa, the second called after a coaches' challenge that the referees initially failed to penalize. Jordan Lynch then scored on a one-yard touchdown run that gave Edmonton a 26–20 lead with 3:22 left to play, and which held up as the final score of the game.

For the Eskimos, it was their 14th Grey Cup championship, and their first since 2005. Mike Reilly was named Most Valuable Player after completing 21 of 35 pass attempts for 269 yards with two touchdown passes. He was also Edmonton's leading rusher at 66 yards. Shamawd Chambers, who missed the majority of the 2015 season with a knee injury, received the Dick Suderman Trophy as Most Valuable Canadian.

== Scoring summary ==
First Quarter
OTT – TD Lavoie 3 yard pass (Milo convert) (11:32) 7–0 OTT
OTT – TD Jackson 7 yard pass (Convert by Milo missed) (8:51) 13–0 OTT
EDM – FG Whyte 25 yards (5:46) 13–3 OTT
EDM – TD Bowman 23 yard pass (Whyte convert) (2:19) 13–10 OTT
Second Quarter
OTT – FG Milo 26 yards (7:34) 16–10 OTT
EDM – S Whyte 44 yard missed field goal (4:27) 16–11 OTT
EDM – TD Shavers 2 yard pass (two-point convert failed) (0:12) 17–16 EDM
Third Quarter
OTT – FG Milo 23 yards (7:03) 19–17 OTT
EDM – S Shaw 69 yard punt (5:00) 19–18 OTT
Fourth Quarter
OTT – S Milo 72 yard punt (9:01) 20–18 OTT
EDM – TD Lynch 1 yard rush (Shavers two-point convert) (3:22) 26–20 EDM
