= CFL on CTV =

Telecasts of the Canadian Football League

- Country of origin: Canada

Production
- Running time: 360 minutes+

Original release
- Network: CTV
- Release: 1961 – 1986
- Release: 2024 – present

CFL on CTV is a presentation of Canadian Football League football airing on the CTV Television Network produced by Bell Media's The Sports Network. It was previously a standalone independently produced program on CTV from 1961 to 1986. CTV dropped coverage of the CFL after the 1986 season; and this coverage was replaced by TSN and the newly-created Canadian Football Network.

== History ==
=== 1961–1986 ===
In February 1961, CFTO-TV, outbid the CBC for the rights to the CFL's Eastern Conference regular season and playoff games. The station was allowed to broadcast only in Toronto and could only air Ottawa Rough Riders and Montreal Alouettes games, as the Toronto Argonauts and Hamilton Tiger-Cats were blacked out in that market. CFTO-TV's owner, John W. H. Bassett applied to the Board of Broadcast Governors for permission to set up a temporary network to broadcast the games in other markets, while another broadcaster, Spence Caldwell, set out to form a permanent network. On April 22, 1961, the BBG rejected Bassett's application and gave Caldwell permission to start the county's first private television network. Caldwell reached an agreement with Bassett to broadcast the games on his new network, which launched as the CTV Television Network on October 1, 1961. After losing the CFL, the CBC acquired the rights to the National Football League and aired their games against the CFL on CTV.

In 1962, CTV purchased the rights to the Grey Cup. The BBG proposed that all stations in the country be required to carry CTV's feed of the game, however the CBC objected because the Corporation did not want to broadcast the game with CTV's sponsors. The BBG eventually ordered the CBC to carry CTV's broadcast of the game and threatened network president Alphonse Ouimet with jail time if the network refused to comply.

On March 15, 1963, the CBC and CTV reached an agreement that saw the two networks split coverage of the Canadian Football League. The CBC had first rights to Saturday games and CTV had first rights to games played on any other day of the week. If two games were scheduled for the same time, the other network had the right to air the game not picked up by their competitor and if a network had to cancel a broadcast, the other network could air the game. Both networks would spilt playoff coverage and the Grey Cup would be aired on both the CBC and CTV. The two sides continued this arrangement until the end of the 1972 season, when the CBC outbid CTV for the rights to the CFL. The CBC still allowed CTV to cover some games and the two networks had a near even split of regular season games and both aired the Grey Cup.

In 1980, brewery Carling O'Keefe, outbid the CBC and CTV for the broadcast rights to the Canadian Football League. Carling O'Keefe sold the rights to the CBC and CTV. The brewery won the rights again in 1983.

After the 1986 season, the CFL and CTV were unable to reach an agreement on broadcasting rights and the league chose to form an independent network, the Canadian Football Network, to broadcast games not aired on CBC or TSN.

=== 2024–present ===
In June 2024, Bell Media announced that CTV would air on digital terrestrial television a package of TSN-produced CFL coverage beginning late in the 2024 season. CTV aired Saturday 3 p.m. ET games beginning on September 7, shared in coverage of the playoffs (CTV broadcast the earlier time zone East Division playoff games), and simulcast the 111th Grey Cup with TSN.

The TSN-produced coverage airing on CTV returned in the 2025 season, now starting from the beginning of the season, and including West Division home games. CTV aired Saturday 7 p.m. ET games beginning on June 7, which switched to Saturday 3 p.m. ET games on August 2; again broadcasting the East Division playoffs and simulcasting the 112th Grey Cup with TSN. The Labour Day Classic weekend games and their rematches the following week, during August 31 – September 6 inclusively, were not included in the CTV package and remained exclusive to the five TSN channels.

== Commentators ==
=== Eastern broadcasts ===
- Johnny Esaw, play-by-play (1961–1973)
- Annis Stukus, colour commentator (1961–1967)
- Joe Spence, host/reporter (1967–1972)
- Bill Bewley, colour commentator (1968–1970)
- Pat Marsden, host/reporter (1968–1973), play-by-play (1974–1986)
- Dick Shatto, colour commentator (1970–1973)
- Wally Gabler, colour commentator (1974)
- Bill Stephenson, host/reporter (1974–1986)
- Mike Wadsworth, colour commentator (1975–1981)
- Leif Pettersen, colour commentator (1982–1986)

=== Western broadcasts ===
- Brad Keene, play-by-play (1962–1966)
- Jack Wells, play-by-play/colour commentator (1962, 1967)
- Al Shaver, play-by-play/colour commentator (1962)
- Stewart MaePherson, colour commentator (1963)
- Frank Anderson, colour commentator (1963–1964)
- Vic Chapman, colour commentator (1965–1966)
- Al McCann, play-by-play (1967–1972), host/reporter (1970–1986)
- Ken Newans, play-by-play (1967–1972), host/reporter (1971–1972)
- Gene Filipski, colour commentator (1967–1970)
- Reg Whitehouse, colour commentator (1967)
- Bob Gillingham, host/reporter (1967–1968)
- Johnny Bright, colour commentator (1970)
- John Wells, play-by-play (1971–1975)
- Hal Ledyard, colour commentator (1971)
- Bernie Pascal, play-by-play (1972), host/reporter (1974–1975)
- Fred Fleming, colour commentator (1972–1977)
- Peter Young, play-by-play (1976–1979)
- Frank Rigney, colour commentator (1978–1986)
- Dale Isaac, play-by-play (1980–1986)
- Jack Gotta, colour commentator (1984)

== Grey Cup ==
The following is a list of Grey Cup games that have been broadcast on CTV:

- 1962, 1963, 1964, 1965, 1966, 1967, 1968, 1969, 1970, 1971, 1972, 1973, 1974, 1975, 1976, 1977, 1978, 1979, 1980, 1981, 1982, 1983, 1984, 1985, 1986, 2024, 2025
