= CFL on CBC =

- Starring: Elliotte Friedman; Mark Lee; Chris Walby; Sean Millington; Greg Frers; Khari Jones; Steve Armitage; Darren Flutie
- Country of origin: Canada

Production
- Running time: 360 minutes+

Original release
- Network: CBC Sports (1952–2007)

CFL on CBC is a presentation of Canadian Football League football aired on CBC Television. CBC held broadcast rights for the CFL from 1952 to 2007. The exclusive broadcasting rights for the league moved to TSN starting from the 2008 CFL season.

== Schedule ==
The broadcast schedule changed several times in its history, but in the final years of the run, CBC showed a game every Saturday. CBC also showed the Labour Day Classic, a Labour Day Monday CFL Doubleheader which always featuring the Toronto Argonauts versus the Hamilton Tiger-Cats and the Edmonton Eskimos versus the Calgary Stampeders. The CFL on CBC also showed the Thanksgiving Day Classic (Monday) doubleheader. From 1991 until 2007, the CBC had exclusive coverage of all playoff games and the Grey Cup Championship Game.

The CFL on CBC ended its run on November 25, 2007, airing the 95th Grey Cup from the Rogers Centre in Toronto, Ontario, after which the CFL left broadcast television and signed a six-year contract with cable network TSN. The CFL granted a no-bid extension to the TSN contract in 2013 (and has offered additional no-bid extensions since then), after which the CBC announced it would no longer pursue professional sports broadcasting rights of any kind.

== Commentators ==
At the end of its run, the CFL on CBC was hosted by Elliotte Friedman, and featured the panel of Sean Millington, Greg Frers, and Khari Jones. Mark Lee and Chris Walby formed the lead broadcast team. The secondary broadcast team was Steve Armitage and Khari Jones. From August 20 – October 4, 2005, the CFL on CBC had no on-air announcers due to a CMG strike.

=== On-air personalities of the CFL on CBC ===
==== Play-by-play ====
- Steve Armitage (1984–1986, 1991, 2005–2007)
- Dean Brown (2000, 2004)
- Don Chevrier (1969–1980)
- Gil Christy (1954)
- Ward Cornell (1955)
- Chris Cuthbert (1992–2004)
- Steve Douglas (1955–1960, 1963)
- Dan Kelly (1964)
- Mark Lee (1996–2007)
- Norm Marshall (1952)
- Bob Moir (1955, 1959–1961)
- Bruce Rainnie (2007)
- Ted Reynolds (1956–1960)
- Fred Sgambati (1960)
- Doug Smith (1957–1958)
- Don Wittman (1961–1997)

==== Colour commentary ====
- Ernie Afaganis (1966–1969)
- David Archer (1996–1997)
- Bill Bewley (1971)
- Leo Cahill (1981–1985)
- Ward Cornell (1959)
- James Curry (1993–1996)
- Chuck Ealey (1986)
- Terry Evanshen (1979–1980)
- Darren Flutie (2002–2006)
- Greg Frers (2007)
- Joe Galat (1991–1993)
- Russ Jackson (1971–1973, 1977–1980)
- Khari Jones (2006–2007)
- Dan Kepley (1991–1996)
- Ron Lancaster (1981–1990)
- Doug Maxwell (1960)
- Larry O'Brien (1952–1953)
- Ken Ploen
- Dave Price (1954–1955)
- Frank Rigney (1969–1977)
- Fred Roberts (1957–1958)
- Fred Sgambati (1963)
- Chris Walby (1998–2007)
- Jack Wells (1954–1955)
- Byng Whiteker (1955–1958)
- Nobby Wirkowski (1966)

==== Hosts ====
- Steve Douglas (1953–1961)
- Elliotte Friedman (2006–2007)
- Dave Hodge (1984–1986)
- Scott Oake (1995)
- John Wells (1973–1983)
- Brian Williams (1987–2005)

==== Studio analysts ====
- Daved Benefield (2007)
- Bernie Faloney (1962)
- Darren Flutie (2002–2006)
- Greg Frers (2003–2007)
- Joe Galat (1993)
- Khari Jones (2006–2007)
- Sean Millington (2003–2004, 2006–2007)
- Annis Stukus (1955)
- Glen Suitor (1995–2002)
- Eric Tillman (2005)
- Chris Walby (1997)

==== Sideline reporters ====
- Ernie Afaganis (1966–1969)
- Frank Anderson (1962–1963)
- Steve Armitage (1977–2007)
- Ward Cornell (1959)
- Mark Connolly (2007)
- Chris Cuthbert (1995)
- Darren Flutie (2006)
- Elliotte Friedman (2005)
- Brenda Irving (1996–2007)
- Khari Jones (2007)
- Mark Lee (2004)
- Doug Maxwell (1961)
- Tom McKee
- Bob Moir (1958–1960)
- Scott Oake (1987–1994)
- Larry O'Brien (1956–1957)
- Brian Williams (1984–1986)
