= Wide World of Sports (Canadian TV program) =

1964–1991 Canadian magazine TV series

Wide World of Sports is a Canadian sports magazine series, which aired on CTV from 1964 to 1991. A franchised adaptation of the American Wide World of Sports, the program initially aired a mixture of content from the American series and original Canadian content produced by CTV and its affiliates, with the balance shifting much more strongly toward original Canadian content in later years.

Like the American series, the Saturday afternoon program presented a package of sporting events, principally in sports such as lacrosse, boxing, skiing, auto racing, rodeo, tennis and figure skating, which did not commonly receive the kind of full prime-time broadcasts that were typical in major league team sports like football, baseball or hockey.

The series premiered on September 19, 1964. Jim McKay, the host of the American version, was occasionally seen on the show, although Johnny Esaw served as the primary Canadian host. Pat Marsden and Dan Matheson were also associated with the program as play-by-play announcers for various sports.

Esaw retired from CTV in 1990, and was replaced as host by Rod Black.

The show aired its final episode on December 28, 1991. It was replaced with the similar CTV Sports Presents, which was cohosted by Black and Tracy Wilson.
