= Carteri =

Carteri is a surname. Notable people with the surname include:

- Carmelo Carteri (born 1956), Canadian football player
- Rosanna Carteri (1930–2020), Italian soprano

== See also ==
- Carter (name)
