= Football referee =

Football referee may refer to the following articles

- Official (American football)
- Official (Canadian football)
- Referee (association football)

== See also ==
- Umpire (Australian rules football)
