= Paul Dojack =

Canadian football referee (1914–2007)

Profile
- Position: Referee

Personal information
- Born: April 24, 1914; Winnipeg, Manitoba, Canada
- Died: November 7, 2007 (aged 93); Regina, Saskatchewan, Canada

Awards and highlights
- Canada's Sports Hall of Fame (1995)
- Canadian Football Hall of Fame (Class of 1978)

Paul Dojack (April 24, 1914 – November 7, 2007) was a Canadian referee in the CFL.

He officiated in 546 CFL games including 15 Grey Cup finals.

In 1978, he was inducted as a builder into the Canadian Football Hall of Fame and was inducted into Canada's Sports Hall of Fame in 1995.

The Paul Dojack Youth Centre in Regina, Saskatchewan, is named in his honour.
