= Football Huddle =

- Genre: Sports talk show
- Starring: Lou Agase; Steve Douglas; Fred Sgambati
- Country of origin: Canada
- Original language: English
- No. of seasons: 1

Production
- Running time: 30 minutes

Original release
- Network: CBC Television
- Release: 28 October – 2 December 1960

Football Huddle is a Canadian sports talk show television program that aired on CBC Television in 1960.

== Premise ==
This talk show concerned Canadian football topics, particularly college football. Series regulars on the panel were sportscasters Steve Douglas and Fred Sgambati with Lou Agase, who coached the Toronto Argonauts. Various guests were featured on their panel.

== Scheduling ==
This half-hour series was broadcast on Friday evenings at various times from September to December 1960.
