= Dave Schreiber =

Canadian radio announcer for the Ottawa Senators

- Born: December 5, 1944 (age 81); Windsor, Ontario, Canada
- Occupation: NHL play-by-play man
- Years active: 1974–present
- Employer: TSN 1200

Dave Schreiber (born December 5, 1944) is a Canadian radio announcer for the Ottawa Senators. He has called their games since their debut, in 1992. He works primarily for TSN 1200, an Ottawa sports radio station.

Schreiber was born in Windsor, Ontario. He has previously announced for the Ottawa 67's, from 1974 until 2012, a total of 38 years. He also has called games for the Ottawa Rough Riders and the Ottawa Renegades.

== Early career ==
Schreiber was inspired to become a broadcaster after meeting with disc jockeys while he was in high school. His first job was as a disc jockey in northern Ontario. After his short stint there, he began calling hockey games in 1965, for the Smiths Falls Bears, a junior hockey team, on CJET-FM radio Smiths Falls. The team was playing in the Eastern Canada Memorial Cup. Schreiber broadcast the semi-finals and finals game for the Bears, against the Lachine Maroons and the Sydney-Cape Breton Post Bombers.

== Ottawa 67's ==
Dave Schreiber was the longtime voice of the Ottawa 67's, an Ontario Hockey League team based in Ottawa, Ontario. He called games for the club from the 1970s to 2012, when he retired from the 67's. He continued with the Ottawa Senators though.

His first call of a 67's game was the 27th of July 1974. That night, the 67's beat the Toronto Marlboros 9–7, with Gord Donnelly scoring the first goal of the game nine seconds in for the 67's. That game was also Brian Kilrea's first game as head coach of the 67's. Schreiber later said "Little did I realize, I’m up there calling my first game — Sept. 27, 1974 — I’m in the booth for my first game, Killer’s down on the bench, and little did I realize I would ride his coattails to five Memorial Cups and he’d become the winningest coach in Canadian junior hockey history and be named to the Hockey Hall of Fame."

The night of his retirement, the 67's held a special night to celebrate his time with the team. That night, Schreiber received a gold microphone in honour of his time spent with the club.

== Other ==
Schreiber has also called games for the Ottawa Renegades, a short-lived Canadian Football League team, from 2002 to 2005, when the team became defunct. Before that, he had called games for the Ottawa Rough Riders (from 1992 to 1995), the city's previous CFL team. He was the third man on the Rough Riders broadcasts in the late 1970s.

Schreiber has been the track announcer for the Rideau Carleton Raceway. He served in that post from 1981 to 1995, and returned from 2001 to 2002.

He also called Ottawa Lynx Triple A baseball as well as called the Heavyweight Commonwealth Boxing title fight between Trevor Berbick and Conroy Nelson in Halifax.

== Personal life ==
Schreiber has 3 children.
