= Darren Flutie =

American football player and coach (born 1966)

No. 89, 82
- Position: Wide receiver

Personal information
- Born: November 18, 1966 (age 59); Manchester, Maryland, U.S.

Career information
- College: Boston College

Career history

Playing
- 1988: San Diego Chargers
- 1990: Phoenix Cardinals
- 1991–1995: BC Lions
- 1996–1997: Edmonton Eskimos
- 1998–2002: Hamilton Tiger-Cats

Coaching
- 2007–2013: Natick HS (Asst.)
- 2014–2017: Newton South HS (OC)
- 2018–2020: Rivers School (OC)

Awards and highlights
- 2× Grey Cup champion (1994, 1999); 3× CFL All-Star (1996, 1997, 1999); 2× CFL East All-Star (1998, 1999); 4× CFL West All-Star (1992,1994, 1996, 1997); Eskimos record: most receptions – game (15) - August 7, 1997; First-team All-East (1987)
- Stats at Pro Football Reference
- Canadian Football Hall of Fame (Class of 2007)

Darren Paul Flutie (born November 18, 1966) is an American former professional football player who was a wide receiver in the National Football League (NFL) and Canadian Football League (CFL). He played college football for the Boston College Eagles. After a brief stint in the NFL, Flutie played in the CFL for the BC Lions, Edmonton Eskimos, and Hamilton Tiger-Cats. He is the CFL's fifth all-time leader in catches, behind Nik Lewis, Geroy Simon, Ben Cahoon, and Terry Vaughn.

== Early life ==
He is the younger brother of quarterback Doug Flutie and also attended Boston College, though he did not graduate. He ranks among the all-time leaders in program history in receptions (134) while also having 2,000 yards and 14 touchdowns. He was inducted into the Varsity Club Hall of Fame in 2007.

=== College receiving statistics ===
Year	Receptions	Yds	TD
1984	9	214	1
1985	42	469	1
1986	35	531	5
1987	48	786	7
Career	134	2,000	14

== Professional career ==
Prior to the CFL, Flutie played briefly for the San Diego Chargers in the 1988 season as an undrafted free agent. He did not have starting time, but he played enough to make 18 receptions for 208 yards and two touchdowns while also returning eight kicks. He was cut prior to the 1989 season and joined the Phoenix Cardinals for 1991 but did not get to play. It was only then that Flutie was convinced by his brother Doug to play in Vancouver with him for the BC Lions. The 1991 season was the only one that saw the two Fluties on the same field, as Doug would leave in free agency for the Calgary Stampeders after the year ended. One of his more memorable performances came in 1994 Western Final, Flutie caught 3 TD passes that during the game including the game-winner with no time left on the clock to push the Lions past his brother Doug’s Calgary Stampeders who were heavily favored. Flutie and the Lions would then go on to beat Baltimore 26-23 to win the Grey Cup.

In 1996, Flutie went to the Edmonton Eskimos, who had quarterback Danny McManus (the quarterback behind BC for most of the 1995 season) on the roster He was named a CFL All-Star for the first time that year after making 86 catches for 1,300+ yards and 6 touchdowns. The following year in 1997 he was named an CFL All Star for a second straight year after making 90 receptions and scoring a career best 9 touchdowns. In 1998, Flutie and McManus signed with Hamilton. Hamilton made two Grey Cups with Flutie on the roster in 1998 and 1999, with both being against Calgary. Flutie did not score a touchdown in the loss of 1998, but he made significant contributions in 1999. He caught a long pass from McManus of 40 yards to set up a field goal to make the score 10–0. Later, he scored the final touchdown of the first half to give them a 21–0 lead. He then scored a touchdown early in the fourth quarter to increase the lead to 32–14 before Hamilton won 32–21, for which McManus won MVP; Flutie caught six passes for 109 yards. It was the last Grey Cup appearance for Hamilton for 14 years and currently ranks as the last Grey Cup championship for the franchise.

With his 1,000-yard season in 2001, he tied a record for most 1,000-yard seasons for a receiver with nine. The following year saw him set a record for most receptions in CFL history; both marks have since been passed.

Flutie ranks fourth all-time in career receiving yardage behind Geroy Simon, Milt Stegall, and Allen Pitts. He held the BC Lions club record for receiving yardage in a season, 1,731 yards, from 1994 to 2004 when Geroy Simon achieved 1750 yards. His Canadian career lasted from 1991 until 2002. In total he played 12 seasons in the CFL, making 972 receptions for 14,359 yards and 66 touchdowns.

During his time in the league, he had various second jobs to make more money, which ranged from selling Christmas trees, bartending, limo driving, or as a Read Custom Soils salesman.

== Honors ==
In 2003 Flutie was named to the BC Lions 50th anniversary team.

In November 2006, Darren Flutie joined his brother, Doug Flutie, on the list of the CFL's Top 50 players of the league's modern era by Canadian sports network TSN.

Flutie He was inducted into the Canadian Football Hall of Fame in 2007.

In 2019 Flutie was honored by the BC Lions being inducted into the team’s Wall of Fame.

In 2023, Flutie was honored by the Ti-Cats with induction into the team's Wall of Honour.

Ti-Cats owner Bob Young commented on Flutie’s induction stating “Darren Flutie’s work ethic, determination and exceptional pass-catching ability embodied exactly what it means to be an all-time Hamilton Tiger-Cat,” “He is one of the best receivers to ever put on a black and gold jersey and it’s only fitting that he’ll take his place on the Wall of Honour, alongside 25 other legendary Tiger-Cats.”

== After football ==
He was as an analyst on the CFL on CBC from 2002 to 2006. Since leaving CBC, Flutie has served as a high school football coach. He was volunteer coach with the Natick High School football team from 2007 until his son Troy graduated in 2014. He was also NHS' boys basketball head coach during the 2008–09 season. He then served as offensive coordinator at Newton South High School and from 2018 to 2020 held the same position at the Rivers School. He also works for a medical device company.

== Personal life ==
With his brother Doug on drums, Darren plays guitar, in the Flutie Brothers Band. The group released a 9 song album in 1996 titled Catch This, along with a CD, Ramblin' Scramblin Man that was released in 1999. The group still occasionally play live shows to this day.

Flutie is married to his wife Teri, together they have a daughter Taylor and a son Troy. He still resides in Natick Massachusetts. His son Troy also went on to play for Boston College.

== Career regular season statistics ==
NFL Statistics				Receiving					
Year	Team	GP	GS	Rec	Yards	Y/R	LNG	TD	PTS
1988	San Diego Chargers	16	-	18	208	11.6	28	2	12
CFL statistics				Receiving					
Year	Team	GP	GS	Rec	Yards	Y/R	LNG	TD	PTS
1991	BC Lions	8	8	52	860	16.5	51	6	36
1992	BC Lions	18	17	90	1,336	14.8	76	4	24
1993	BC Lions	17	16	79	1,068	13.5	45	5	30
1994	BC Lions	18	15	111	1,731	15.6	61	8	48
1995	BC Lions	12	11	59	893	15.0	58	2	12
1996	Edmonton Eskimos	17	17	86	1,362	15.8	42	6	36
1997	Edmonton Eskimos	17	16	90	1,313	14.6	51	9	58
1998	Hamilton Tiger-Cats	17	17	98	1,386	14.1	73	5	32
1999	Hamilton Tiger-Cats	18	18	84	1,155	13.8	37	7	42
2000	Hamilton Tiger-Cats	17	17	79	1,120	14.2	58	4	26
2001	Hamilton Tiger-Cats	18	18	84	1,206	15.1	49	6	36
2002	Hamilton Tiger-Cats	18	18	64	929	14.5	40	4	24
Total		195	--	972	14,359	14.8	76	66	404

=== CFL records ===
- Playoff receptions : 185
- Regular season receptions : 972 (since passed by others, including leader Nik Lewis in 2017)
- Most seasons 1,000 yards receiving : 9 (tied with Allen Pitts) (passed by Milt Stegall in 2008)
