= James Curry (Canadian football) =

American gridiron football player (born 1957)

Profile
- Position: Defensive tackle

Personal information
- Born: October 26, 1957 (age 69); Chowchilla, California, U.S.

Career information
- College: Nevada-Reno

Career history
- 1983: British Columbia Lions
- 1983–1985: Toronto Argonauts
- 1986: Ottawa Rough Riders
- 1987–1989: Saskatchewan Roughriders

Awards and highlights
- 2× Grey Cup champion (1983, 1989); 2× CFL All-Star (1984, 1985)

James Curry (born October 26, 1957) was a defensive tackle who played seven seasons in the Canadian Football League (CFL). He won Grey Cups in 1983 with the Toronto Argonauts and 1989 with the Saskatchewan Roughriders—his first and last seasons in the league.

Following his retirement, he was a colour commentator for the CFL on CBC.
