= Rick Moffat =

Canadian radio announcer

Rick Moffat is a Canadian radio announcer. He recently provided play-by-play commentary for CJAD radio and TSN 690 for Montreal Alouettes games and Montreal Impact games. He also co-hosted The Morning Show on TSN 690 alongside Conor McKenna and Shaun Starr, weekday mornings from 6 - 10 a.m. As of November 28, 2019, he was no longer employed by the station.

== Broadcasting career ==
Moffat began his play-by-play career with the Montreal Machine of the NFL-run World League of American Football. When the Alouettes returned CFL play to Montreal, Moffat worked with CJAD 800 broadcast legend Ted Blackman, former Seattle Seahawk and Toronto Argonaut Tommy Kane, as well as longtime Alouette all-star Tony Proudfoot, who would become Moffat's co-host in the booth until the 2008 season.

Moffat joined the CJAD 800 Hockey Broadcast team in 2004, during the spring playoffs.

Moffat currently provides play-by-play commentary for TSN 690 for Montreal Alouettes games and Montreal Impact games. He also co-hosted The Morning Show on TSN 690 alongside Elliott Price and Shaun Starr, weekday mornings from 6 - 10 a.m. He is known as the voice of MLS's Montreal Impact.

== Personal life ==
Born October 8, 1960 in Lachine, Quebec, he was one of five children born to James Moffat, a decorated World War 2 hero with the Royal Canadian Air Force and the Belgian and French Resistance whose wartime memoir was published in "Behind Enemy Lines", and to Anne Dosman Moffat, a Prairie survivor of the Depression and the Dustbowl of Saskatchewan in the 1930s. His nephew, Derek O'Farrell is a current member of the Canadian national rowing team men's eight, having won medals at three world championships (2006, 2007, and 2009).

Moffat holds a Bachelor of Journalism degree from Carleton University and has been working full-time in radio since 1982.

Moffat is a longtime supporter of Amnesty International, Inter Pares, Montreal's Social Justice Committee, the MAB-Mackay Foundation, the Miriam Foundation, and the Montreal Children's Hospital.
