= Giulio Caravatta =

Canadian football player (born 1966)

Profile
- Position: Quarterback/Punter

Personal information
- Born: March 20, 1966 (age 60); Etobicoke, Ontario, Canada

Career information
- College: Simon Fraser

Career history
- 1991–1995: BC Lions
- 1996: Montreal Alouettes
- 1996–1998: BC Lions

Awards and highlights
- Grey Cup champion (1994)

Giulio Caravatta (born March 20, 1966) is a Canadian former professional football quarterback who currently serves as a Canadian Football League (CFL) analyst on CKNW as the colour commentator for BC Lions radio broadcasts.

A quarterback and punter at Simon Fraser University, Caravatta signed with the BC Lions as an undrafted free agent in 1991. He made his first start on October 21, 1995 against the Baltimore Stallions. Caravatta was selected by the Montreal Alouettes in a dispersal draft to provide the former Stallions with non-import players, but was traded back to the Lions after he refused to report to his new team. He made one start at quarterback late in the season. It would be Caravatta's last career start at quarterback and until November 8, 2015, the last start for any Canadian-born quarterback in the Canadian Football League until Brandon Bridge started for the Montreal Alouettes. In addition to playing quarterback, Caravatta also saw time as a kicker, punter, and holder.

Caravatta's broadcasting career began in 1999 as an analyst on the Lions' pre- and postgame shows. In 2000 he became the team's colour commentator.

Caravatta is also a retired member of the West Vancouver Fire and Rescue Unit.
