= Dale Isaac =

- Born: September 21, 1949 (age 76); Saskatoon, Saskatchewan
- Occupation: Sportscaster
- Known for: CFL on CTV
- Awards: Canadian Football Hall of Fame

Dale Isaac is a Canadian sportscaster who worked in Regina, Saskatchewan. He was the sports director at CKCK-TV from 1975 to 1995 and a play-by-play man on CTV's telecasts of CFL games from 1980 to 1986.

Isaac was born on September 21, 1949, in Saskatoon. He graduated from Martin Collegiate and worked as a switchman for the Canadian National Railways before following his brother, Mal Isaac, and brother-in-law, John Badham, into the field of broadcasting.

Isaac began his career at CJNB in North Battleford, Saskatchewan. He then moved to CJME in Regina, where he became the play-by-play announcer for the Saskatchewan Roughriders in 1971. The station lost the rights to Roughriders games after the 1973 season and Issac moved to the new rightsholder, CKCK, where he also called Regina Pats games. In 1975, he became the sports director of CKCK-TV. From 1980 to 1986, he was the play-by-play announcer on CTV's western broadcasts CFL games. He also covered the 1980 and 1984 Winter Olympics for the network.

Isaac remained at CKCK-TV until 1995, then worked at CJME until his retirement in 2004. In 2003, he and his brother Mal were inducted into the Football Reporters of Canada section of the Canadian Football Hall of Fame.

Following his retirement from broadcasting, Isaac moved to Edmonton and took up Computer Aided Design, becoming a designer working with office space design and layouts. He worked as a designer in Edmonton for a number of years before moving back to Saskatoon in 2013 where he continued doing design work part-time until gradually retiring.
