= Bob Irving (sportscaster) =

Canadian sportscaster (born 1950)

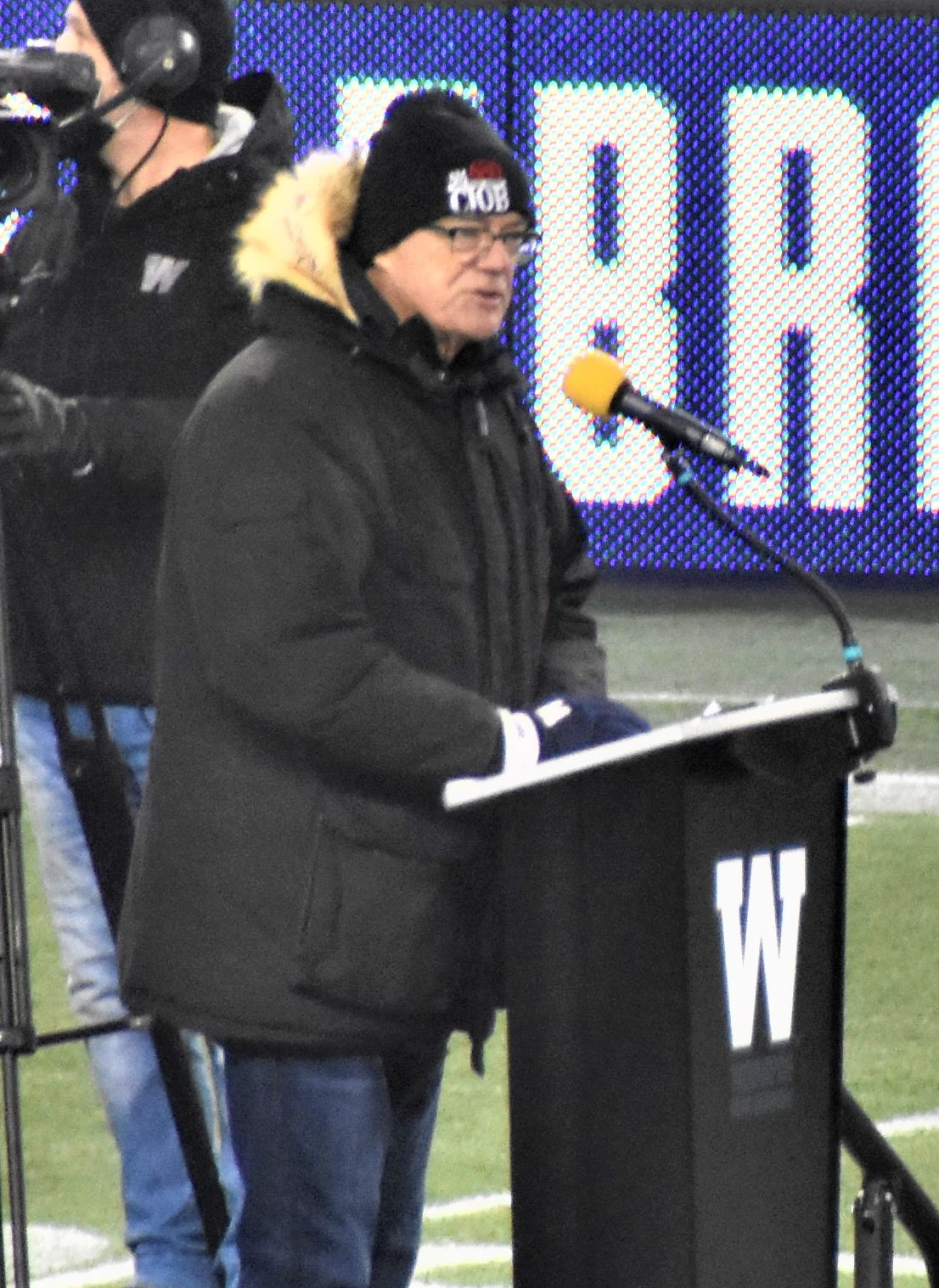
- Irving at the 2021 Grey Cup celebration for the Winnipeg Blue Bombers
- Born: 1950 (age 75–76)
- Other name: Knuckles
- Sports commentary career
- Genre: play-by-play
- Sport: Canadian football

Bob "Knuckles" Irving, OM (born 1950) is a Canadian former sportscaster and was the radio play-by-play voice for the Canadian Football League's Winnipeg Blue Bombers from 1973 until his retirement in 2021. He is also the former sports director for CJOB radio in Manitoba and a member of the Canadian Football Hall of Fame.

A native of Regina, Saskatchewan, Irving began his radio career in the 1960s, working at a small radio station in Estevan. He moved to Brandon, Manitoba in 1970 and then to Winnipeg in 1973 to join CJOB. A year later, he began calling Blue Bomber games for the station. During his career, Irving has also called several Grey Cup games on national radio. He also called CFL games nationally for the league-produced Canadian Football Network from 1987 to 1990.

Irving was inducted into the Football Reporters of Canada section of the Canadian Football Hall of Fame in 1997. In 2013, the Blue Bombers named the new media room at Investors Group Field in his honour. In 2014, he was made a member of the Order of Manitoba.
