= Sara Orlesky =

Canadian sports reporter

- Born: July 30, 1980 (age 46); Winnipeg, Manitoba
- Occupation: Sportscaster
- Employer: Winnipeg Jets
- Known for: SportsCentre, CFL on TSN

Sara Orlesky (born July 30, 1980) is a Canadian sports reporter, currently a senior host and producer for the Winnipeg Jets on TSN. She was formerly the Winnipeg Bureau Reporter for TSN's SportsCentre. In 2008, The Globe and Mail described her as "among the top young female sports broadcasters in Canada."

== Biography ==
Sara Orlesky was born in Winnipeg, Manitoba, July 31, 1980. She graduated from Shaftesbury High School in Winnipeg. She is now a mom to her only daughter, Avery.

Hired in November 2007, Orlesky joined TSN in January 2008 as a reporter for the Toronto bureau, reporting on major sports stories in the Greater Toronto Area.

Before working at TSN, Orlesky lived in Vancouver, British Columbia where she reported for The Score. Orlesky worked for Citytv Vancouver as a weekend sports producer while studying communications at Simon Fraser University. She was promoted to weekend sports anchor, leaving in 2004. Orlesky reported on figure skating at the 2010 Winter Olympics.

When TSN opened its Winnipeg bureau, Orlesky became the lead reporter. She was regularly seen on SportsCentre, with a special focus on the Jets and Blue Bombers. She also joined the CFL on TSN broadcast team as a sideline reporter in the 2008 season where she has since covered regular season and playoff games, including the Grey Cup.

She joined the Winnipeg Jets in the summer of 2022 in a partnership with TSN, continuing to make appearances on Jets on TSN broadcasts.
