= Canadian Football Network =

Syndicated broadcasts of the Canadian Football League

The Canadian Football Network (CFN) was the official television syndication service of the Canadian Football League from 1987 to 1990.

== History ==
=== Creation ===
The Canadian Football Network was created directly in response to CTV completely dropping their CFL coverage following the 1986 season. No single sponsor was willing to front the costs for television rights to the CFL as Carling O'Keefe Breweries had for the 1984–1986 term. No other sponsors emerged, and CFL rejected the CTV Television Network's bid for 1987 as unacceptable. Additionally, there had been concerns that the league's coverage had degraded in quality. John Kernaghan wrote, "For years, the televised presentation of CFL games plodded along, the networks in limp lockstep. Two old boys' clubs fraternized while the fans yawned and the league tottered."

As a result, the Canadian Football Network was announced in March 1987 to air 37 regular-season and at least two playoff games across a group of independent stations: CHCH in Hamilton, CKND in Winnipeg, CFAC in Calgary, CITV in Edmonton, CKVU in Vancouver, and STV in Saskatchewan. At its announcement, the network had no affiliates in Quebec or the Atlantic provinces. CHRO-TV in Pembroke, Ontario, reaching the Ottawa market, was able to reach an agreement with the CBC to air 11 games of the network's package, while French-language CHOT attempted to obtain permission to air the full 37-game package in English. By the start of the season, it added MCTV in Sudbury, Ontario; the Atlantic Satellite Network, and ABC affiliate WVNY-TV in Burlington, Vermont. The U.S. station aired the package as it was turned down by all English-language TV stations in Montreal. Though WVNY could not carry the entire 37-game network schedule due to commitments to ABC weekend sports programming, with many games to be tape delayed when the fall TV season began, 70 percent of Montreal homes had cable and could see the station, plus additional viewers who received it over the air.

=== Operations ===
In its first year on the air, the CFL experimented with the TV blackout policy as four games (two in Hamilton and two in Toronto) were televised in the Hamilton-Toronto market. It originated its own coverage of the Grey Cup, separate from the CBC feed; it attracted 1.1 million viewers to the 3.9 million that watched the CBC telecast.

The venture was more costly than had been anticipated, with revenues from the CFL's other TV deals with the CBC and The Sports Network (TSN) funding its operation. Teams received less than half of what they had expected due to poor national advertising sales. For 1988, CFPL-TV in London, Ontario, a former CBC station going independent, joined the network at midseason, and CFN offered 34 of the league's 67 televised games. The 1988 CFL all-star game aired on CFN in lieu of TSN, which backed out when the league insisted on a blackout of Edmonton. As in 1987, blackouts were lifted in the Toronto–Hamilton area, and CFN supplied separate play-by-play coverage of the Grey Cup. Increased TV revenues were initially said to meet forecasts of $450,000 to $500,000 per team, but soft sales for the playoffs and higher production expenses for the Grey Cup put the final figure at $420,000.

Prior to the 1989 season, Carling O'Keefe reached a two-year, $15 million contract with the league, guaranteeing each CFL club $650,000 in television revenue a season. The brewery was expected to put an end to the CFN arrangement, but the network continued to operate in 1989, airing 30 of the league's 72 regular season fixtures. Independent Grey Cup coverage continued, with CFN providing additional camera angles to the host broadcast produced by the CBC. CFN coverage in 1990 was picked up by SportsChannel America in the United States, which featured a Game of the Week.

=== Dissolution ===
The Canadian Football Network deal ran through the 1990 season, and even before it began, reports indicated that the network would not return for 1991. Reports indicated that new CFL commissioner Donald Crump was negotiating with CTV to become a league telecaster for 1991, and as the Grey Cup was played, CFN's future was in doubt. In the end, CTV—which had desired to telecast one game a week—did not sign a deal, but the Canadian Football Network also disappeared. In 1991, only CBC and TSN telecast games, and 15 fewer games of the CFL schedule were televised.

== Legacy ==
CFN's legacy was mixed. It was a financial failure and in some ways failed to serve all audiences. Kent Gilchrist of The Province, writing in 1996, called it "ill-conceived" and blamed it for making it harder to watch the CFL outside of major cities. However, its telecast quality received more positive reviews. Cam Cole credited the CFN for "trying harder" and adopting a style that was "almost American in approach", as well as with encouraging the CBC to invest in its production quality with reverse-angle cameras and improved camerawork on the sidelines. Some CFN telecasts were produced by Paul Graham, who received multiple awards for his football coverage.

== Commentators ==
Former Edmonton Eskimos fullback Neil Lumsden was CFN's primary colour man, while Dave Hodge and Bob Irving, a long-time voice of the Blue Bombers, provided play-by-play.

Play-by-play/pregame hosts

- Dave Hodge
- Bob Irving

Colour commentators/Pregame analysts

- Nick Bastaja
- Ian Beckstead
- Jan Carinci
- Joe Faragalli
- Dan Kepley
- Lary Kuharich
- Tom Larscheid
- Neil Lumsden
- Mike Riley
- Mike Clemons

The theme music package for CFN was provided by Donald Quan.

== See also ==
- 1987 CFL season
- 1988 CFL season
- 1989 CFL season
- 1990 CFL season
