= Steve Douglas (sportscaster) =

Canadian sportscaster known as Steve Douglas (c.1911–1981)

- Born: Douglas Lesueur c. 1911; Ottawa, Ontario
- Died: October 8, 1981 (age 70); Barrie, Ontario
- Sports commentary career
- Sports: Canadian football, ice hockey, various
- Military career
- Allegiance: Canada
- Branch: Royal Canadian Air Force
- Conflicts: World War II

Douglas Lesueur (c. 1911 – October 8, 1981) known on-air as Steve Douglas was a Canadian sportscaster, most notably with CBC Sports.

== Early life ==
The only child of Hockey Hall of Fame goaltender Percy LeSueur, Douglas was born in Ottawa. He attended Walkerville Collegiate Institute, where he was a standout golfer. After his father got a job in Buffalo, New York, Douglas attended high school in Fort Erie, Ontario.

== Career ==
Douglas broadcasting career began in 1930 as the play-by-play announcer for the home games of the Syracuse Stars of the International Hockey League on WSYR. In 1937, while working as the traffic manager for CKLW in Windsor, Ontario, Douglas left a suicide note and disappeared for a while before returning. By 1939, Douglas was working for WWNC in Asheville, North Carolina, where he called high school football.

Following the outbreak of World War II, Douglas enlisted in the Royal Canadian Air Force, serving for three years. After the war, he worked freelance in Washington, D.C. and Baltimore. In 1953, he returned to Canada to call college football in Toronto, which led to him getting an offer from the Canadian Broadcasting Corporation to call Interprovincial Rugby Football Union games for the network.

Douglas was a sports anchor for CBLT in Toronto and an announcer for the CFL on CBC from 1953 to 1965. At the CBC, Douglas called ten Grey Cups and the 1964 Tokyo Olympics and hosted Weekend in Sports, Football Huddle, Locker Room, and World of Sport. He covered the 1954 British Empire and Commonwealth Games for the CBC and called Roger Bannister and John Landy's "Miracle Mile". Douglas' contract was not renewed by CBC in 1965.

== Later life ==
Douglas worked for on the public relations staff of the Ontario Jockey Club from 1965 to 1968. He then moved to Barrie, where he covered sports for CKVR-TV and CKBB until he was hospitalized in May 1981. Douglas died October 8, 1981, at the age of 70 following an illness. He was survived by his wife Maria and four children: daughters Ilma Mowery, Frances Nickolaus and Kathryn, and son Michael.
