= Carmelo Carteri =

Canadian gridiron football player (born 1956)

Carm Carteri
Profile
- Position: Linebacker

Personal information
- Born: July 17, 1956 (age 70); Regina, Saskatchewan, Canada
- Listed height: 6 ft 2 in (1.88 m)
- Listed weight: 216 lb (98 kg)

Career information
- College: Montana

Career history
- 1979–1980: Saskatchewan Roughriders
- 1981–1982: Hamilton Tiger-Cats
- 1983: Montreal Concordes
- 1985: Saskatchewan Roughriders

Awards and highlights
- CFL East All-Star (1981)

Carmelo Carteri (born July 17, 1956) is a Canadian football player who played professionally for the Saskatchewan Roughriders, Hamilton Tiger-Cats and Montreal Concordes.
