= Mike Wadsworth =

Canadian football player and diplomat

Profile
- Position: Defensive lineman

Personal information
- Born: June 4, 1943; Ottawa, Ontario, Canada
- Died: April 28, 2004 (aged 60); Mayo Clinic, Rochester, Minnesota, U.S.
- Listed height: 6 ft 3 in (1.91 m)
- Listed weight: 250 lb (113 kg)

Career information
- College: Notre Dame

Career history

Playing
- 1966–1970: Toronto Argonauts

Operations
- 1970–1971: CFLPA (President)

Awards and highlights
- CFL East All-Star (1968); Gruen Trophy (1966)

Michael A. Wadsworth (June 4, 1943 – April 28, 2004) was an all-star Canadian Football League defensive lineman, and later lawyer, QC, Canadian Ambassador to Ireland, business executive, and television sports analyst.

Wadsworth was one of six siblings born to Bernard "Bunny" and Catherine (née Kehoe) Wadsworth. He played high school football at De La Salle College (Toronto) before attending the University of Notre Dame on a football scholarship. Despite knee injuries, he won a monogram as a defensive tackle in 1964.

Wadsworth played professional football for the Toronto Argonauts from 1966 to 1970, during which time he also earned his law degree from Osgoode Hall Law School in Toronto. He started his five-year career by winning the Gruen Trophy as the best rookie in the East for 1966. He was later named a 1968 Eastern All-Star.

In 1970, Wadsworth became the second president of the Canadian Football League Players' Association (CFLPA). He was the first active player to hold the position, retiring from the CFL and the CFLPA presidency at the start of the 1971 season.

After his football days, he became a lawyer and QC. He completed the Advanced Management Program at Harvard Business School. He was a football analyst on the CFL on CTV broadcasts. He was appointed Canadian Ambassador to Ireland in 1989 and named athletic director at Notre Dame in 1995. He served as an executive with Crownx, Inc.

His father starred for the Ottawa Rough Riders in 1940 and was voted to their half-century team in 1960.

== Death ==
Wadsworth died of bone and bladder cancer, aged 60, at the Mayo Clinic in Rochester, Minnesota. He was survived by his mother (Catherine), his wife (Bernadette), three daughters, and four siblings, and a large extended family.

== See also ==
- Bernard Wadsworth
