= Johnny Esaw =

Canadian sportscaster (1925–2013)

- Born: June 11, 1925; North Battleford, Saskatchewan, Canada
- Died: April 6, 2013 (aged 87); Toronto, Ontario, Canada
- Citizenship: Canadian
- Occupations: Sports broadcaster; television executive
- Years active: 1947–1996
- Employer(s): CJNB; CKRM; CKRC; CFTO-TV; CTV
- Known for: CFL on CTV; figure skating coverage; 1972 Summit Series
- Awards: Member of the Order of Canada (2004)

Johnny Esaw, CM (June 11, 1925 – April 6, 2013) was a Canadian sports broadcaster and television network executive. He was a pioneer of sports broadcasting in Canada, best known for his involvement with figure skating, football, and international hockey.

== Early broadcasting career ==
Born in North Battleford, Saskatchewan, Esaw was unsuccessfully selling insurance in 1947 when Emile Francis hired him to cover semi-professional baseball games on radio station CJNB in North Battleford. In 1949, he moved to a bigger market in Regina, Saskatchewan at CKRM, where he worked until 1956. He provided play-by-play coverage of the 1951 Grey Cup game from Varsity Stadium in Toronto—the beginning of what became a long affiliation with the Canadian Football League. In 1956, Esaw became sports director of Winnipeg's CKRC.

== Moves to television ==
Esaw made the transition to television late in 1960, becoming sports director of CFTO-TV, Toronto's first privately owned TV station, as it prepared for launch. Foster Hewitt was an early investor in the station and helped persuade Esaw to move east. CFTO was part of the CTV Television Network, and Esaw headed negotiations for the broadcast rights for many prominent sports events. Under Esaw, figure skating received significant coverage on CFTO and across CTV, making national stars out of Canadian world champions Donald Jackson and Otto Jelinek & Maria Jelinek. Esaw worked with Roone Arledge, head of ABC Sports to secure North American rights to the world figure skating championships. CTV and ABC also partnered in bringing Wide World of Sports to Canada. Esaw also brought the 1964 Winter Olympics to CTV and bought the rights to the 1972 Canada-Russia Summit Series (the broadcasts ended up being shared with CBC Television). Esaw hosted the English-language telecasts and is best remembered for conducting the famous post-game interview with Phil Esposito following Game 4 in Vancouver, British Columbia. He was also the lead play-by-play man for the CFL on CTV from 1962 until 1973 and then the host from 1974 until 1986.

== A network executive ==
In 1974, Esaw became vice-president of CTV Sports, a position he held until his retirement in 1990. He negotiated the host broadcasting rights to the 1988 Winter Olympics in Calgary.

After retiring from CTV, Esaw joined Houston Group as vice-president of broadcasting operations and remained in that role after Houston was acquired by Edelman, the world's largest public relations firm. With Edelman, Esaw worked on several sports events, including golf tournaments, tennis, and motor sports. He retired in 1996 at the age of 71. Esaw died in Toronto at age 87 on April 6, 2013, of respiratory problems.

== Honours ==
Esaw was inducted into the Canadian Football Reporters Hall of Fame (1984), the Canadian Olympic Hall of Fame (1991), Canada's Sports Hall of Fame (1991), the Canadian Amateur Sports Hall of Fame (1991), the North Battleford Sports Hall of Fame (1992), the CAB Broadcast Hall of Fame (1997), and the Canadian Figure Skating Hall of Fame (1997). In 2004, he was made a Member of the Order of Canada.

== Personal life ==
Esaw was of Assyrian descent.
