= Farhan Lalji =

Canadian sportscaster

- Education: Simon Fraser University
- Occupation: Canadian Sports Reporter
- Employer: TSN
- Known for: SportsCentre

Farhan Lalji is a Vancouver-based sports reporter and the Vancouver Bureau Reporter for TSN's SportsCentre. He previously anchored SportsDesk between 1997 and 2000.

== Career ==
Lalji joined TSN in 1997 as an anchor of TSN's flagship sports news program, SportsCentre (then SportsDesk). He currently covers the Canucks, Lions, and Whitecaps FC, as well as other sports stories from around the Vancouver area as SportsCentre's Vancouver Bureau Reporter. He has reported from many of the biggest sporting events in North America, including the Stanley Cup Finals, NBA Finals, Grey Cup, MLB and NBA All-Star Games, golf's U.S. Open and PGA Championship, and the 2004, 2006, and 2010 Olympic Games.

Lalji is also a regular contributor on TSN 1040 radio and a fill-in sports anchor at CTV Vancouver.

Prior to joining TSN, Lalji worked as a sports and weekend news anchor for the CBC from 1995 to 1997, and a producer and reporter on the ‘Sports Machine’ at CKWX Radio in Vancouver.

== Personal life ==
Lalji was born in Tanzania. He graduated from Simon Fraser University in liberal arts with a minor in communications and history. He is married with two children and lives in New Westminster.

Lalji currently serves as head football coach for the New Westminster Hyacks, leading the team to the Subway Bowl in 2017 and came away as the AAA provincial champions. He also served as President of the British Columbia Secondary Schools Football Association.

== Awards ==
Farhan is a five-time winner of the Best Sports TV Reporter in Vancouver for 2012-15 and 2017 at the Paul Carson Broadcast & Media Awards. In 2016, he was honoured at the awards with a win for Leadership in Philanthropy, due to his high school football coaching and his community service as head coach of the New Westminster Hyacks.

In 2012, Lalji was named New Westminster's Citizen of the Year for his dedication to the community, and in 2010 he was named Provincial Scholastic Coach of the Year at the BC Lions Orange Helmet Awards. In 2004 and 2012 he was runner-up for NFL Canada National Coach of the Year.

Lalji was announced as a member of the Canadian Football Hall of Fame 2024 class, in the media wing, on May 3, 2024.
