= Brian Williams (sportscaster) =

Canadian sportscaster (born 1946)

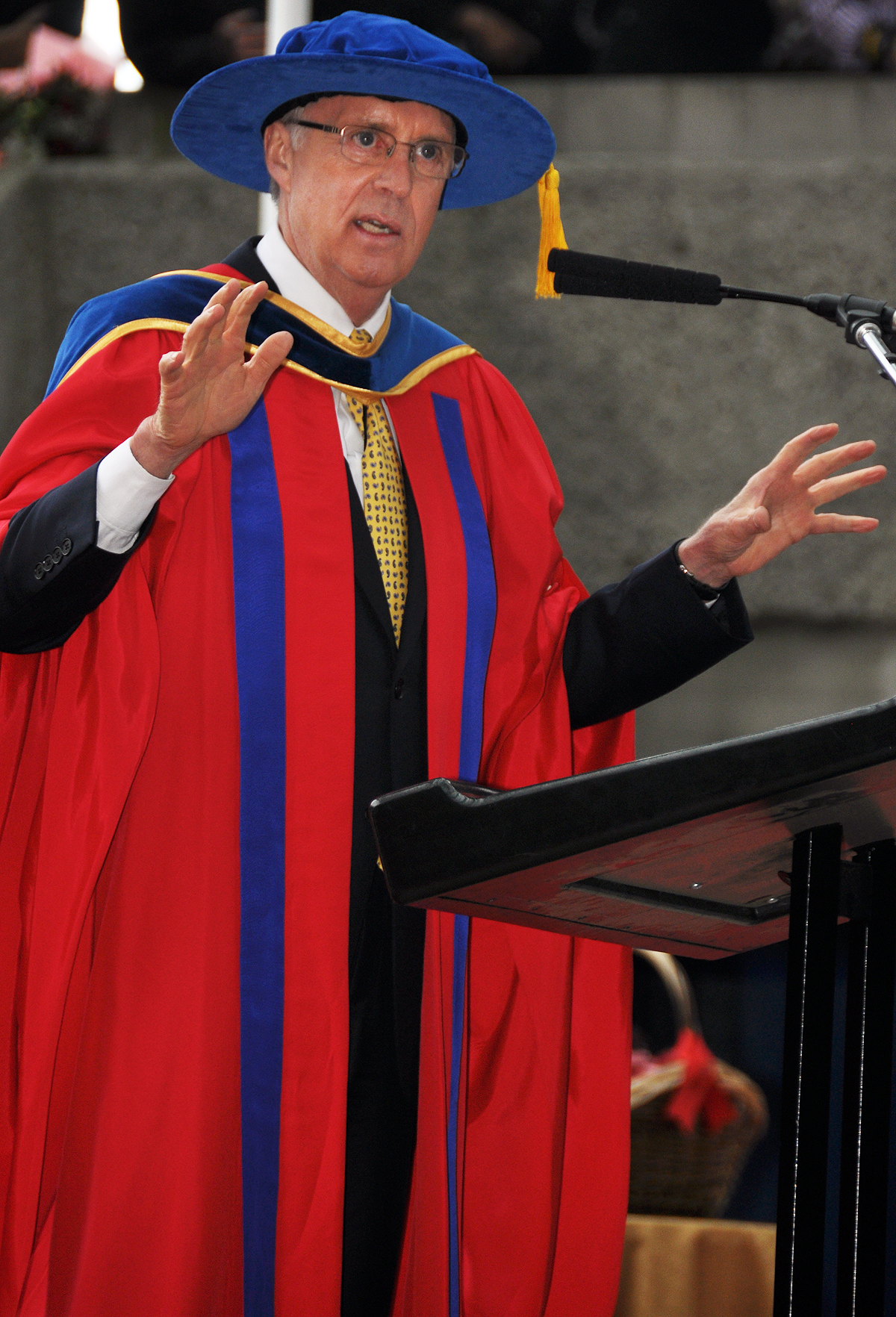
- Williams accepting an honorary degree from Simon Fraser University in 2011
- Born: July 18, 1946 (age 80); Winnipeg, Manitoba, Canada
- Occupation: Sportscaster
- Known for: Coverage of the Olympic Games

Brian James Williams OC (born July 18, 1946) is a Canadian retired sportscaster who is best known for his coverage of the Olympic Games.

== Early life ==
Williams' father was a physician. His father's work caused the Williams family to relocate to such places as Invermere, British Columbia; New Haven, Connecticut; Edmonton, Alberta; Hamilton, Ontario (where he graduated from Westdale Secondary School); Grosse Pointe Farms, Michigan and Grand Rapids, Michigan (where he graduated from Aquinas College with a B.A. in history & political science in 1969). After graduating, he spent a year as a teacher at a Grand Rapids school.

== Broadcasting career ==
Williams began his involvement in broadcasting when he applied for a part-time job at his college's classical station WXTO which was located in the tower of the Aquinas College's Administration Building. Williams also was the first to travel with the Aquinas College "Tommies" Basketball team announcing the "Tommies" basketball games via a one-man telephone connection. Williams' college goal was to go back to Canada and become a sports journalist.

Williams was long associated with the Canadian Broadcasting Corporation's sports coverage since joining the network in 1974, after radio employment at Toronto's CFRB and CHUM.

=== CBC ===
Williams served as the studio host for the CBC's coverage of the CFL, Formula 1 and horse racing and was the play-by-play announcer for the network's coverage of Toronto Blue Jays baseball. He was the principal studio anchor for CBC's Olympic Games coverage for the 1984 Winter, 1984 Summer, 1988 Winter, 1988 Summer, 1992 Winter, 1996 Summer, 1998 Winter, 2000 Summer, 2002 Winter, 2004 Summer and 2006 Winter Olympics. Williams also covered the 2002 FIFA World Cup for CBC.

Williams also worked with Peter Mansbridge during 2000 Today, CBC's coverage of the millennium.

=== CTV and TSN ===
On June 5, 2006, Williams announced plans to move in December 2006 to rival CTV, and its sports network TSN. However, on June 8, 2006, the CBC fired Williams, thereby causing him to join CTV/TSN effective immediately as on-site host of TSN's Canadian Football League coverage. (This position should not be confused with the "studio host" position that remains held by Rod Smith.)

Williams was chosen to head the CTV broadcasting team at the 2010 Winter Olympics in Vancouver.

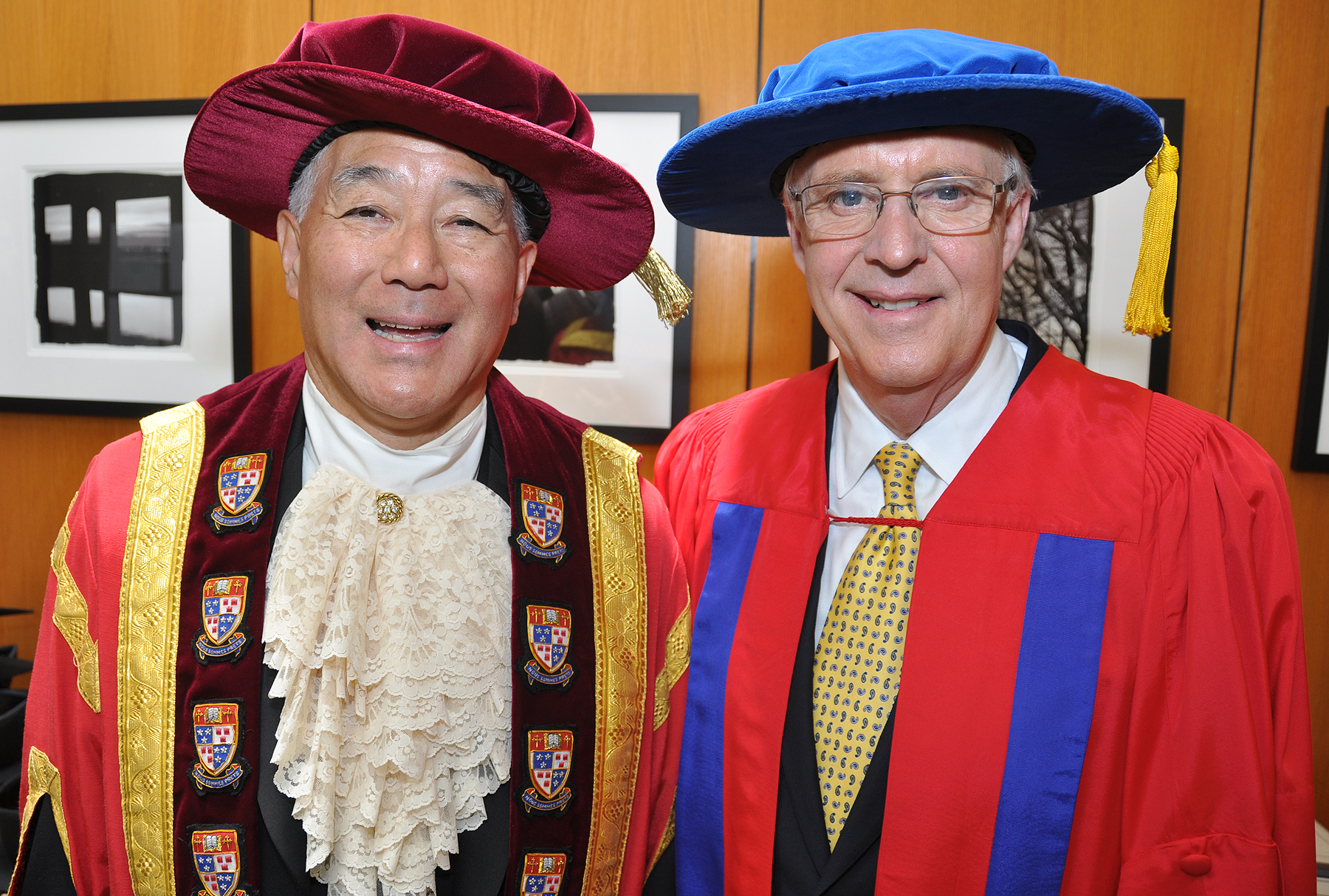
Williams with Brandt C. Louie in 2011

On February 22, 2010, while providing coverage of the Winter Olympics, Williams did a skit with Brian Williams, the anchor of NBC Nightly News, at CTV's Olympic set. Some in the media dubbed this the new "Battle of the Brians," as NBC's Williams compared his own modest set to CTV's expensive Olympic studio.

Williams anchored CTV's coverage of the 2012 Summer Olympics in London. He criticized the International Olympic Committee for not properly honouring the Israeli delegates who were slain during the 1972 Summer Olympics.

He continues to appear, as of 2019, as a contributor to CFL on TSN, as host of TSN's coverage of the Canadian Triple Crown of Thoroughbred Racing, and as host of figure skating coverage on both networks and also contributes content to TSN Radio.

He was inducted into the Canadian Football Hall of Fame in 2010.

=== Radio ===
Until 2019, Williams co-hosted Don Cherry's Grapeline on Sportsnet Radio, along with Don Cherry, for thirty-five years, first on CFRB radio in Toronto, and then as a syndicated show on Sportsnet.

=== Retirement ===
Brian Williams announced his retirement from broadcasting on December 2, 2021, after a 50-year career.

== Quirks ==
His unique voice and quirks such as frequently announcing the time, sometimes in several different time zones at once, has made him one of Canada's most distinctive broadcasters. He was a frequent subject of parody on Canadian comedy shows such as Royal Canadian Air Farce.

== Honours ==
In 2011, he was made an Officer of the Order of Canada "for his contributions to sports broadcasting, notably that of amateur sports, and for his community involvement".

In 2022, he was awarded the Order of Sport, marking his induction into Canada's Sports Hall of Fame.

=== Commonwealth honours ===
Commonwealth honours

Country	Date	Appointment	Post-nominal letters
Canada	November 3, 2011 – Present	Officer of the Order of Canada	OC

- He received his Order of Canada Insignia during an Investiture at Rideau Hall from Governor General David Johnston on May 25, 2012.

=== Scholastic ===
Honorary degrees

Location	Date	School	Degree	Gave Commencement Address
Michigan	2006	Aquinas College	Doctor of Humane Letters (DHL)	Yes
British Columbia	June 16, 2011	Simon Fraser University	Doctor of Laws (LL.D)	Yes
