= Greg Frers =

Canadian football player (born 1971)

No. 12
- Position: Defensive back

Personal information
- Born: August 4, 1971 (age 55); Mississauga, Ontario, Canada

Career information
- University: Simon Fraser
- CFL draft: 1993: 2nd round, 14th overall pick

Career history
- 1993–1995: Calgary Stampeders
- 1996: Winnipeg Blue Bombers
- 1997: BC Lions
- 1998–2002: Calgary Stampeders

Awards and highlights
- 2× Grey Cup champion (1998, 2001); Tom Pate Memorial Award (2002); CFL All-Star (2000); 3× CFL West All-Star (1999, 2000, 2001)

Gregory Frers (born August 4, 1971) is a Canadian former professional football player who played ten years in the Canadian Football League. Frers played defensive back for the Calgary Stampeders, Winnipeg Blue Bombers and BC Lions from 1993 to 2002. He was part of the Stampeders 1998 and 2001 Grey Cup winning teams. Frers was an All-Star in 2000 and he also won the Tom Pate Memorial Award in 2002. He played CIS football at Simon Fraser University.

After playing, he became a CFL analyst for the CBC.
