= Al McCann (broadcaster) =

Canadian sports announcer (1930–2015)

- Born: January 9, 1930; Lethbridge, Alberta, Canada
- Died: March 11, 2015 (aged 85); Edmonton, Alberta, Canada
- Career
- Station(s): CJLH (1959–63); CFRN (1963–1990s)
- Style: Sports, play-by-play
- Country: Canada

Allan "Al" McCann (January 9, 1930 – March 11, 2015) was a Canadian play-by-play sports announcer, who worked in Canadian football and ice hockey.

== Career ==
His broadcasting career began in the late 1950s, holding the position of sports director at CJLH Television in Lethbridge, Alberta from 1959 to 1963. He then moved to Edmonton to work for CFRN radio and television, serving as sports director from 1963 until his retirement in the early 1990s.

During his time at CFRN (branded as CTV Edmonton), McCann covered the 1980 and 1988 Winter Olympics, announcing the skiing events. He was CTV's host of its coverage of the 1976 Summer Olympics. He has also broadcast 28 Grey Cup matches as well as numerous Stanley Cup playoff series and curling briers.

McCann was inducted into the Media Wing of the Canadian Football Hall of Fame and Museum and Alberta Sports Hall of Fame as a reporter in 1993. He has also been recognized as a member of the Lethbridge Sports Hall of Fame, as well as by the City of Edmonton. He died on March 11, 2015, aged 85.
