= Ted Reynolds (broadcaster) =

Ted Reynolds (c. 1925 – April 28, 2009) was a broadcaster on both Canadian television and radio. His career spanned for more than fifty years, with some thirty five having been spent with the CBC.

== Career ==
Ted Reynolds joined the CBC in 1956 and covered numerous sports and events, notably the Olympic Games, Commonwealth Games, Pan American Games and Grey Cup. He provided commentary for 23 sports and 10 Olympiads.

== Legacy ==
Reynolds is a member of the CBC's Sports Hall of Fame, and the only media member so honored in the Canadian Aquatic Hall of Fame.

== Family ==
Reynolds, a native of Grand Forks, British Columbia, was a West Vancouver resident of many years.

He is survived by his second wife, Joan, of 34 years (his first wife died in the early 1970s), four children, eight grandchildren and four great-grandchildren.

== Death ==
Ted Reynolds died, aged 84, on April 28, 2009 in Vancouver.
