= Leif Pettersen =

Canadian gridiron football player (1950–2008)

Profile
- Positions: Slotback, Wide receiver

Personal information
- Born: December 23, 1950; Etobicoke, Ontario, Canada
- Died: July 30, 2008 (aged 57); Toronto, Ontario, Canada
- Listed height: 6 ft 2 in (1.88 m)
- Listed weight: 183 lb (83 kg)

Career information
- College: Otterbein College
- CFL draft: 1974

Career history
- 1974–1977: Saskatchewan Roughriders
- 1978–1981: Hamilton Tiger-Cats

Awards and highlights
- Lew Hayman Trophy (1979)

Leif Pettersen (December 23, 1950 – July 30, 2008) was a receiver who played eight seasons in the Canadian Football League (CFL) for the Saskatchewan Roughriders and the Hamilton Tiger-Cats. He was born in Toronto, Ontario.

After playing college football at Otterbein College in Westerville, Ohio, Pettersen was drafted by the Saskatchewan Roughriders in 1974 and played in the CFL for eight seasons. In 1976, Pettersen's Roughriders lost one of the most memorable Grey Cups when Ottawa's Tony Gabriel caught a long touchdown pass in the last minute to give the (Ottawa) Rough Riders the win. However, even in a losing cause, that game was still a career highlight as Pettersen caught seven passes that day and received the game ball from then CFL Commissioner Jake Gaudaur. Three years later, as a member of the Hamilton Tiger-Cats in 1979, he won the Lew Hayman Trophy.

After retiring, he spent eighteen years as an analyst for the CFL on CTV and Friday Night Football. Pettersen joined TSN as a game analyst in 1987, when the network began televising CFL games (and after CTV ceased CFL coverage).

Pettersen also worked at RBC Sports Professionals & Private Client Group as Director of Business Development, managing banking and investments for athletes, coaches and sports executives. He was the president of a chemical manufacturing firm in Etobicoke as well. Pettersen was a founding Governor of the Etobicoke Sports Hall of Fame and was appointed as a Governor of Canada's Sports Hall of Fame in 2006. In 1992, he was considered for the position of commissioner of the Canadian Football League, but his asking price was too high.

Pettersen died on the evening of July 30, 2008, at the age of 57 of a heart attack in Toronto.
