= Steve Armitage =

Canadian sportscaster (born 1944)

- Born: 20 June 1944 (age 82); High Wycombe, Buckinghamshire, England
- Occupation: Sports reporter
- Years active: 1973–2022

Steve Armitage (born 20 June 1944) is a British-born Canadian retired sports reporter, formerly with CBC Sports. He reported on and hosted Hockey Night in Canada broadcasts for the Vancouver Canucks for nearly 30 years, the Canadian Football League (CFL) and Grey Cup for 30 years, the Olympics including speed skating, swimming and diving, and the World Cup.

== Early life and education ==
Born in High Wycombe, Buckinghamshire, England, UK, he was raised in Victoria, British Columbia and Dartmouth, Nova Scotia. He attended Saint Mary's University, Halifax where he played football quarterback, graduating in 1968 with a Bachelor of Arts degree.

== Career ==
In 1965, he began working at CBC on a part time basis in Halifax, writing the late night sportscast.

In 1973, he moved to Vancouver, joining Bill Good Jr. at CBC Vancouver covering local and national sports.

Armitage won the 1982 ACTRA Foster Hewitt Award for Excellence in Sports Broadcasting and he was nominated for a Gemini Award in 1998 for his coverage of speed skating at the Winter Olympics. In 2006, he was inducted into the BC Sports Hall of Fame.

Armitage was one of the two play-by-play announcers (the other being Nigel Reed) announcing for CBC Sports in the 2007 FIFA U-20 World Cup in Canada. Paul Dolan was the analyst alongside Armitage. He reported the swimming at the 2008 Summer Olympics for CBC.

Armitage was laid off by the CBC in August 2014 due to cuts to sports programming and the loss of hockey coverage to Rogers Media. He did, however, return to work for CBC at the 2018 and 2022 Olympics to call events such as long track speed skating. Armitage announced his retirement at the conclusion of the 2022 Winter Olympics.
