= Frank Rigney =

American gridiron football player (1936–2010)

No. 67
- Position: Offensive lineman

Personal information
- Born: April 9, 1936; East St. Louis, Illinois, U.S.
- Died: June 29, 2010 (aged 74); West Vancouver, British Columbia, Canada
- Listed height: 6 ft 4 in (1.93 m)
- Listed weight: 233 lb (106 kg)

Career information
- College: Iowa
- NFL draft: 1958: 4th round, 43rd overall pick

Career history
- 1958–1967: Winnipeg Blue Bombers

Awards and highlights
- 4× Grey Cup champion (1958, 1959, 1961, 1962); CFL's Most Outstanding Offensive Lineman Award (1961); 2× DeMarco–Becket Memorial Trophy (1960, 1961); 3× CFL All-Star (1962, 1965, 1966); 7× CFL West All-Star (1959–1962, 1964, 1965, 1966)
- Canadian Football Hall of Fame (Class of 1985)

Frank Rigney (April 9, 1936 – June 29, 2010) was an offensive tackle for the Winnipeg Blue Bombers in the Canadian Football League (CFL).

== College ==
Rigney played college football with another Blue Bomber great, quarterback Ken Ploen at the University of Iowa.

== CFL ==
Frank Rigney was an outstanding offensive tackle for Winnipeg. During his 10-year stint from 1958 to 1967, Winnipeg won the Grey Cup four times, in 1958, 1959, 1961, and 1962. Winnipeg also participated and lost in 1965, the so-called Wind Bowl. "The first year we got a tie clasp from the city. The second year that we won, we did get a ring, the one and only one we got. The next two that we won, I can't remember what we got. I think we got a watch," Rigney stated. Rigney retired from football due to back injuries. Through ten seasons he only missed five games.

== Post-football ==
After football, he had a thirty-five year career in the insurance business and did media work for twenty years. He was the colour commentator for both the CBC and CTV football broadcasts, plus covered other sports such as the 1980 Winter Olympics in Lake Placid, New York, and the 1984 Winter Olympics in Sarajevo, Yugoslavia.

In 2003, Rigney received a titanium shoulder replacement. In 2004 due to an ulcer in his right foot he had a toe amputated. Later, Rigney's right leg was amputated below his knee after an infection from an operation turned to gangrene. At the time of his death, Rigney resided in West Vancouver.
