= Pat Marsden =

Canadian sportscaster (1936–2006)

Patrick Francis Marsden (November 8, 1936 – April 27, 2006) was a Canadian sportscaster and voice of the Canadian Football League play-by-play coverage in the 1970s and 1980s. He also worked as host for the historic 1972 Canada-Soviet Union hockey Summit Series sports telecasts. He was inducted into the Canadian Football Hall of Fame in 1989.

Marsden was born in Ottawa and attended St. Patrick's High School and the University of Ottawa, where he started his sportscasting career at local station CKOY.

He later became sports director at CFTO in Toronto, and became immersed in all local and national sporting events. He even appeared as "John Marsden" in an episode of Bizarre (filmed at CFTO), in a Super Dave Osborne stunt at Toronto's CN Tower.

Fired in 1986 after a physical altercation with his boss Ted Stuebing, Marsden then was hired by his CTV football broadcasting partner Bill Stephenson at CFRB, went to TSN, and later surfaced at The Fan 590. After helping to rebuild and essentially help create the image for The Fan 590, he retired in 2004.

Marsden spent most of his time in Florida due to what he felt was the socialization of Canadian society, but he continued to maintain a home in Toronto.

He returned in 1996 to live in Toronto with his family joining him and died of lung cancer on April 27, 2006, aged 69, at Sunnybrook and Women's College Health Sciences Centre.
