= Official (Canadian football) =

Referee in Canadian football

An official in Canadian football is a person who has responsibility in enforcing the rules and maintaining the order of the game, like their counterparts in the American game. In the Canadian Football League, and elite amateur football including university and junior football, seven officials operate on the field. Most lower levels of play use less than the standard seven.

Football officials are commonly, but incorrectly, referred to collectively as referees, but each position has specific duties and a specific name: referee, umpire, down judge (formerly head linesman), line judge, back judge, side judge, and field judge. Because the referee is responsible for the general supervision of the game, the position is sometimes referred to as head referee or crew chief. The centre judge, used only in the United States in NCAA Division I college football and in the AAF during its single season, has not been used in Canadian football yet; the CFL used an eighth official (with no official position name) only during the 2018 playoffs, but that official's only responsibility was watching for head contact with the quarterback.

== Equipment ==
Canadian football officials generally use the following equipment:

- Whistle
  Used to signal that the play has ended.
  Penalty Marker or Flag
  A bright orange (or yellow, at the CFL level) coloured flag that is thrown on the field toward or at the spot of a foul. It is wrapped around a weight, such as sand, beans, or small ball, so it can be thrown with some distance and accuracy.
  Bean Bag
  Used to mark various spots that are not fouls. For example, it is used to mark the spot of a fumble or where a player caught a punt.
  Down Indicator
  A specially designed wristband that is used to remind officials of the current down. It has an elastic loop attached to it that is wrapped around the fingers. Usually, officials put the loop around their index finger when it is first down, the middle finger when it is second down, and so on. Instead of the custom-designed indicator, some officials use two thick rubber bands tied together as a down indicator: one rubber band is used as the wristband and the other is looped over the fingers. Some officials, especially Umpires, may also use a second indicator to keep track of where the ball was placed between the hash marks before the play (i.e. the right hash marks, the left ones, or at the midpoint between the two). This is important when they re-spot the ball after an incomplete pass.
  Game Data Card and Pencil
  Officials write down important administrative information, such as the winner of the pregame coin toss, team timeouts, and fouls called. Game data cards can be disposable paper or reusable plastic. A pencil with a special bullet-shaped cap is often carried. The cap prevents the official from being stabbed by the pencil while it is in his pocket.
  Stopwatch
  Officials will carry a stopwatch (typically a digital wristwatch) when necessary for timing duties, including keeping game time, keeping the play clock, and timing timeouts and the interval between quarters.
  Clip
  The down judge will place a clip on the chain at the edge of the line closest to the rear stick in order to make measurements and to set up for 2nd and 3rd quarters.

== Uniform ==
For ease of recognition, officials are traditionally clad in a black-and-white vertically striped shirt, black slacks with a white strip down the side (white knicker pants with black "Northwestern stripe" stirrup socks and white sanitary socks were worn in the past), with a black belt, black shoes, and a peaked baseball cap; the referee wears a white cap, whereas the other officiating crew members wear black ones; prior to 2019, the CFL used black caps for the referees, and white caps for the other officiating crew members; the convention was reversed in the 2019 season to match the convention used at the amateur ranks and all levels of football in the United States.

== Positions and responsibilities ==
=== Referee ===
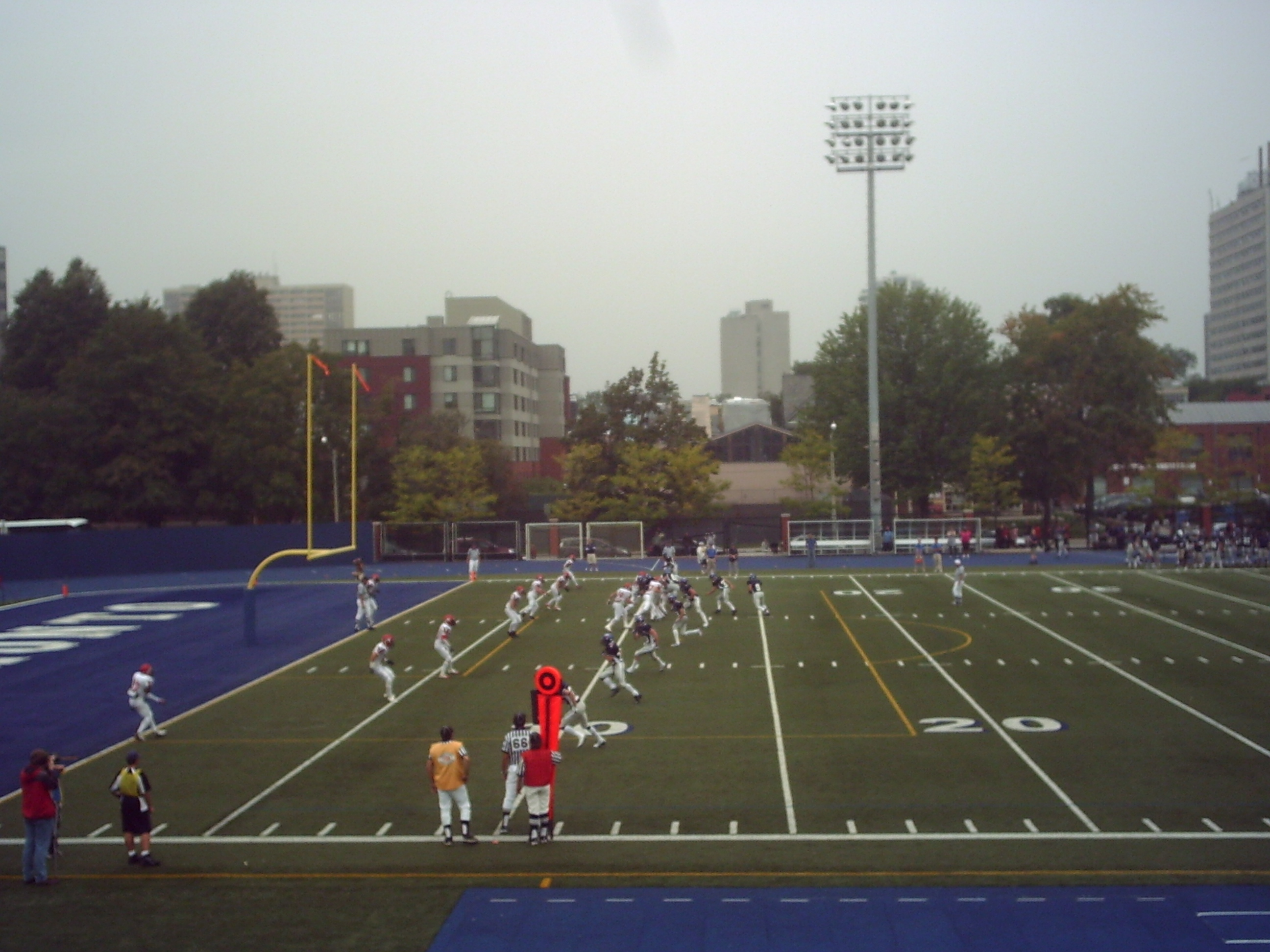
The referee can be seen with the white cap behind the offensive team (in blue) in this 2008 CIS football (now U Sports) game.

The referee is responsible for the general supervision of the game and has the final authority on all rulings. Thus, this position is sometimes referred to as head referee and is considered to be the crew chief. He can be easily identified by his differently coloured cap. Historically, in the Canadian Football League (CFL), the referee wore a black cap while the other officials wore white caps. In amateur football, including U Sports football, the referee wears a white cap with black piping while the other officials wear black caps with white piping. As mentioned above, in 2019, however, CFL referees now wear white caps while other officials now wear black caps, bringing the convention in line with all levels of playing in the American game and Canadian amateur football.

During each play from scrimmage, the referee positions himself behind the offensive team, favouring the right side (if the quarterback is a right-handed passer). He also counts offensive players.

On passing plays, he primarily focuses on the quarterback and defenders approaching him. The referee rules on possible roughing the passer and, if the quarterback loses the ball, determines whether it is a fumble or an incomplete pass.

On running plays, the referee observes the quarterback during and after he hands off the ball to the running back, remaining with him until the action has cleared just in case it is really a play action pass or some other trick passing play. Afterwards, the Referee then shifts his focus to the point of attack to look for blocking fouls.

During punts and field goals, the referee observes the kicker (and holder) and any contact made by defenders approaching them.

In the CFL and other professional leagues, and in some U Sports football games, the referee announces penalties and the numbers of the players committing them, and clarifies complex and/or unusual rulings over a wireless microphone to both fans and the media. CFL referees, unlike their counterparts in the NFL and American college football, identify the city or province of the team committing the foul when announcing penalty enforcement, instead of using "offense" or defense".

During instant replay reviews in the CFL, the referee confers with a replay official, who is located at the CFL head office, on the play and then announces the final result from the replay official over the wireless microphone.

In addition to the general equipment listed above, the referee also carries a coin in order to conduct the pregame (and if necessary, overtime) coin toss.

=== Umpire ===
The umpire (U) stands behind the offensive team, parallel to the referee, on the opposite side of the quarterback. He observes the blocks by the offensive line and defenders trying to ward off those blocks — looking for holding or illegal blocks. Prior to the snap, he counts all offensive players.

During passing plays, he moves forward toward the line of scrimmage as the play develops in order to (1) penalize any offensive linemen who move illegally downfield before the pass is thrown or (2) penalize the quarterback for throwing the ball when beyond the original line of scrimmage. He also assists on ruling incomplete passes when the ball is thrown short.

As the umpire is situated where much of the play's initial action occurs, he is considered by many to hold the most dangerous officiating position.

In addition to his on field duties, the umpire is responsible for the legality of all of the players' equipment.

=== Down Judge/Head Linesman ===
The down judge (DJ; formerly the head linesman (H or HL)) stands at one end of the line of scrimmage (usually the side opposite the press box), looking for possible offsides, encroachment and other fouls before the snap. As the play develops, he is responsible for judging the action near his sideline, including whether a player is out of bounds. During the start of passing plays, he is responsible for watching the receivers near his sideline to a point 5-7 yards beyond the line of scrimmage.

He marks the forward progress of the ball and is in charge of the chain crew in regard to its duties. In addition to the general equipment listed above, the down judge also carries a chain clip that is used by the chain crew in order to properly place the chains and ensure an accurate spot when measuring for a first down.

Prior to 2018, the CFL referred to the position as the head linesman.

=== Line Judge ===
The line judge (L or LJ) assists the head linesman at the other end of the line of scrimmage, looking for possible offsides, encroachment and other fouls before the snap. As the play develops, he is responsible for the action near his sideline, including whether a player is out of bounds. He is also responsible for counting offensive players.

During the start of passing plays, he is responsible for watching the receivers near his sideline to a point 5-7 yards beyond the line of scrimmage. Afterwards, he moves back towards the line of scrimmage, ruling if a pass is forward, a lateral, or if it is illegally thrown beyond the line of scrimmage.

On punts and field goal attempts, the line judge also determines whether the kick is made from behind the line of scrimmage.

=== Field Judge/Back Umpire ===
The field judge (F or FJ; back umpire (BU) in amateur football) works downfield behind the defensive secondary on the same sideline as the line judge. He makes decisions near the sideline on his side of field, judging the action of nearby running backs, receivers and defenders. He rules on pass interference, illegal blocks downfield, and incomplete passes. He is also responsible for counting defensive players. He has sometimes also been the official timekeeper.

With the back judge, he rules whether field goal attempts are successful. For the CFL, this was the fifth official, added in 1951.

=== Side Judge ===
The side judge (S or SJ) works downfield behind the defensive secondary on the same sideline as the head linesman. Like the field judge, he makes decisions near the sideline on his side of field, judging the action of nearby running backs, receivers and defenders. He rules on pass interference, illegal blocks downfield, and incomplete passes. He also counts defensive players. During field goal attempts he serves as a second umpire. For the CFL, this was the seventh official, added in 1991.

=== Back Judge ===
The back judge (B or BJ) stands deep behind the defensive secondary in the middle of the field, judging the action of nearby running backs, receivers (primarily the tight ends) and nearby defenders. He rules on pass interference, illegal blocks downfield, and incomplete passes. He covers the area of the field in between himself and the umpire. He has the final say regarding the legality of kicks not made from scrimmage (kickoffs).

With the field judge, he rules whether field goal attempts are successful. For the CFL, this was the sixth official, added in 1979.

=== Replay official ===
In CFL football, the replay official is not located at the stadium, rather at the CFL Command Centre at the CFL Head Office in Toronto. The official is responsible for the final determination of challenges made by the two teams' head coaches; and in the final 3 minutes (and all of overtime) of the game initiating a review of any play they believe warrants such attention. The official also reviews all scoring plays during the game. When a review is underway, the referee speaks to the replay official via headset at the sideline. The replay official has the final call over all challenges and reviews.

U Sports and other leagues in Canada do not utilize the replay-review process.

=== Eighth official ===
Late in the 2018 playoffs, the CFL added an eighth official to the on-field crew; it did not have an official position title. This official lined up in the offence's backfield, and his sole responsibility was helmet contact on the quarterback. This position was only used in the Eastern and Western finals and the Grey Cup. The eighth official did not return in 2019.

== History ==
Up until 1950, the forerunner leagues to the present-day Canadian Football League (founded in 1958) used only four officials: The referee, umpire, head linesman and line judge. Over the next 40 years, the system would change into what is more-or-less equal to what most American football leagues use today, a seven-official system. The first new addition to the crew was the field judge (also referred to as the back umpire) in 1951, then the next addition being the back judge in 1979, and the seventh official, the side judge being added in 1991.

Among the various Halls of Fame for major North American sports, unlike the Pro Football Hall of Fame in the United States (which has not inducted any of its officials into its Hall of Fame), but like the Baseball, Basketball, and Hockey Halls of Fame, there have been some officials that worked in the CFL that have been inducted as members of the Canadian Football Hall of Fame.

== Other officiating systems ==
Junior football, high school football, and other levels of football commonly use less officials than the standard seven-man officiating crew.

- A three-official system uses only the referee, umpire, and head linesman. It is common in junior high and youth football. At those levels, it is also common for the umpire to line up in the line judge's position on most plays.
- A four-official system uses the referee, the umpire, the head linesman, and the line judge. It is primary used at lower levels of football, including junior varsity and some high school varsity.
- A five-official system is used in arena football (out of consideration for its smaller field size), most high school varsity football, and in most semi-pro games. It adds the back umpire, with duties similar to the back judge from the seven-man system, to the four-official system.
- A six-official system adds a back judge and back umpire to the four-official system. Of the two added officials, one is on the middle of the field each play, similar to a back judge in a seven-man system, while the other is on the sideline, similar to a field judge or side judge. It is used in some high school and small-college games.

== See also ==
- Official (American football)
- Glossary of Canadian football
