= List of Montreal Canadiens broadcasters =

Montreal Canadiens games are broadcast locally in both the French and English languages. CHMP 98.5 is the Canadiens' French-language radio flagship. As of the 2017–18 season, the team's regional television in both languages, and its English-language radio rights, are held by Bell Media. CKGM, TSN Radio 690, is the English-language radio flagship; it acquired the rights under a seven-year deal which began in the 2011–12 season. In June 2017, Bell Media reached a five-year extension.

Regional television rights in French are held by Réseau des sports (RDS) under a 12-year deal that began in the 2014–15 NHL season. A sister to the English-language network TSN, RDS was the only French-language sports channel in Canada until the 2011 launch of TVA Sports, and was also the previous national French rightsholder of the NHL; as a result, the Canadiens chose to forgo a separate regional contract, and allowed all of its games to be televised nationally in French as part of RDS's overall NHL rights.

With TVA Sports becoming the national French rightsholder in the 2014–15 season through a sub-licensing agreement with Sportsnet, RDS subsequently announced a 12-year deal to maintain regional rights to Canadiens games not shown on TVA Sports. As a result, games on RDS are blacked out outside the Canadiens' home market of Quebec, Atlantic Canada and parts of Eastern Ontario shared with the Ottawa Senators. At least 22 Canadiens games per season (primarily through its Saturday night La super soirée LNH), including all playoff games, are televised nationally by TVA Sports.

TSN2 assumed the English-language regional television rights in the 2017–18 season, with John Bartlett on play-by-play, and Dave Poulin, Mike Johnson and Craig Button on colour commentary. All other games, including all playoff games, are televised nationally by Sportsnet or CBC. Bartlett returned to Sportsnet over the 2018 off-season, and was succeeded by Bryan Mudryk.

English-language regional rights were previously held by Sportsnet East (with Citytv Montreal as an overflow channel), under a three-year deal that expired after the 2016–17 season; the games were called by Bartlett and Jason York. Prior to this deal, TSN held the rights from 2010 through 2014; the games were broadcast on a part-time channel with Dave Randorf on play-by-play.

== Radio ==
Hockey Night in Canada originated as the General Motors Hockey Broadcast on 12 November 1931. The radio was the only way to access the games remotely until 1952, when it began to air on television as well. Journalist Charles Mayer provided the French language commentary for radio broadcasts, and was responsible for the choice of team captain Maurice Richard as the first, second and third star of a playoffs game in which he scored five goals against the Toronto Maple Leafs on 23 March 1944. The games were then simulcast on radio/TV from 1952 to 65. The play-play announcers during this time period included Doug Smith (1937-55) and Danny Gallivan (1955-67) with Elmer Ferguson on colour commentary from 1937 to 67. Keith Dancy also provided colour commentary from 1952 to 66.

Local English language radio was not broadcast before 1953-54, when Danny Gallivan did Thursday home games for CFCF through 1960-61. English language radio did not return until February 4, 1969, when Dick Irvin Jr. began doing all non-CBC or CTV games on CFCF. The broadcasts moved to CJAD in 1991-92 (in June 2010 it was announced that Canadiens broadcasts would switch to sports radio station CKGM, now on AM 690 and co-owned with CJAD), with Irvin retiring after 1996-97. From 1997-98 through 2001-02, it was Dino Sisto on play-by-play and Pierre McGuire on colour commentary. Murray Wilson took over colour commentary duties in 2002-03. Rick Moffat succeeded Sisto starting with the 2004 playoffs.

Starting in 1975-76, CFCF carried Saturday games as well. With Irvin unavailable on Saturdays, the play-by-play duties were handled by Fred Walker from 1975 to 78, Ron Reusch from 1979 to 85 (Ron Reusch had previously done colour commentary on home games in 1971 to 72 with Dick Irvin Jr. doing road games alone), Rob Faulds from 1985 to 87, Brian McGorman from 1987 to 91, Ron Francis on play-by-play and Steve Shutt on colour commentary on Saturday nights from 1991 to 94, Peter Mahovlich on colour commentary in 1993-94, and Dino Sisto on play-by-play with Jim Corsi on colour commentary from 1994 to 97.

The CBC English language radio network covered Canadiens and Toronto Maple Leafs Sunday night games from 1965 through 1976. Announcers worked in various combinations of play-by-play and colour commentary from 1966 through 1976. This included Danny Gallivan (who worked the non-televised games), Foster Hewitt, Bill Hewitt, Fred Sgambati, Dan Kelly, Ted Darling, Fred Walker, Don Chevrier, Tom McKee, Bob McDevitt, Tim Ryan, Bob Cole, Bob Wilson and Dick Irvin, Jr. During the 1965-66 season, play-by-play was done by Gallivan, both Hewitts and Dan Kelly. The intermission hosts in the four "Original Six" American cities were Bob Elson in Chicago, Jim Gordon in New York, Fred Cusick in Boston, and Jim Chorley in Detroit. What was notable in that series of games is that Bob Cole's first game (between the Canadiens and Boston Bruins at Boston), aired on CBC Radio on April 24, 1969. Bob McDevitt served as the colour commentator on that date.

In the 1970s, the Canadiens games came on at night on CBF (with René Lecavalier on play-by-play), the French language CBC affiliate at 690 AM. As previously mentioned, CBC Radio picked up the Sunday broadcasts and carried them as NHL Sunday Hockey, a companion to the Saturday TV package. The same thing went on in Toronto, where Foster Hewitt's CKFH (note his initials in the call letters) had the rights to the Maple Leafs, but Sunday games were also on CBC Radio (or CBL 740 on Sunday nights).

== Television ==
Local English language television was very rare in Montreal. The Hockey Channel, a pay channel started doing Sunday road games February 2, 1961, continuing through 1961–62. The Hockey Channel only covered the regular season, no playoffs, with play-by-play provided by Jim Gordon.

Road games returned to pay TV in 1964-65 via Telemeter, with Danny Gallivan and Jerry Trudell on commentary.

CTV carried Wednesday night Canadiens games from 1964–65 through 1975–76, with Danny Gallivan and Dick Irvin Jr. on commentary. On March 16, 1966, CTV's coverage of the game between the Canadiens and Maple Leafs was frequently interrupted for news updates on the Gemini 8 space mission, which had run into serious trouble after being successfully launched that morning; when the game ended, CTV joined a simulcast of CBS News coverage in time for the capsule's re-entry and splashdown. These were produced by the McLaren ad agency, which also produced the Saturday night Hockey Night in Canada games for the CBC. As was the case with the Saturday games, they were contests (usually at home) of the Montreal Canadiens, Toronto Maple Leafs, and after 1970, the Vancouver Canucks.

Since 1984–85, various combinations of play-by-play announcers and analysts have been assigned to Canadiens games on Hockey Night in Canada. The play-by-play announcers included Dick Irvin Jr., Bob Cole (until Rogers acquired the NHL rights, he had been HNIC's #2 play-by-play man since 2008, primarily calling the Canadiens games), Don Wittman, Chris Cuthbert, Ken Daniels, and Jim Hughson. The analysts included Dick Irvin Jr., Mickey Redmond, Gary Dornhoefer, John Garrett, Harry Neale, Steve Shutt, Greg Millen, John Davidson, Patrick Flatley, Craig Simpson, Glenn Healy, Kelly Hrudey, Ron Tugnutt, Drew Remenda, Cassie Campbell, Garry Galley, and Marc Crawford.

TSN had a very small number (less than 10 a year) of regional Canadiens games from approximately 1998-99 to 2001-02. Vic Rauter did play-by-play for those games.

Rogers Sportsnet had them in 2002-03 and 2003-04 with Rob Faulds and later Peter Loubardias doing play-by-play. John Druce did the colour on Sportsnet telecasts when they had the rights for a couple years.

Years	Play-by-play	Colour commentators
1931–36	Charlie Harwood	
1942–52	Doug Smith (Danny Gallivan substituted on one game in 1950-51)	
1952–66	Danny Gallivan	Frank Selke Jr. (1958 playoffs through 1960 playoffs); Keith Dancy (1960–61 through 1965–66)
1966–77	Danny Gallivan	Dick Irvin Jr. Dan Kelly (1966–67); Don Marshall (select games); Red Storey (select games)
1977–84	Danny Gallivan	Dick Irvin Jr. Chico Resch (select games and 1978 Stanley Cup Finals); Bill Clement (select games); Gary Dornhoefer (select games); Lou Nanne (select games); Mickey Redmond (1980–84)
1984–87	Dick Irvin Jr.	Mickey Redmond (select games); Gary Dornhoefer (select games)
1987–90	Dick Irvin Jr.	Scotty Bowman
1994–98	Dick Irvin Jr.	Steve Shutt
1998–2000	Paul Romanuk (TSN)	Gary Green (TSN)
2000–01	Gord Miller (TSN)	Gary Green (TSN)
2001–04	Rob Faulds (Sportsnet)	John Druce (Sportsnet)
2010–14	Dave Randorf	Dave Reid
2014–17	John Bartlett	Jason York
2017–18	John Bartlett	Dave Poulin (select games); Mike Johnson (select games); Craig Button (select games)
2018–present	Bryan Mudryk	Dave Poulin (select games); Mike Johnson (select games); Craig Button (select games)

=== Notes ===
- After several years in commerce, Dick Irvin Jr. turned to sports broadcasting, first as a media liaison for the Canadiens and then, starting in 1966, a colour commentator on their radio and television broadcasts, alongside play-by-play announcer Danny Gallivan. From the late 1970s through the 1980s, he acted as both the colour commentator and studio host for Hockey Night in Canada (HNIC) telecasts from Montreal. This meant that he missed the beginnings and ends of periods as he moved from ice level to the broadcast booth and back.
- When Ron Reusch returned to Canada, he started working for radio station CKGM in Montreal, and for years was part of the English broadcast crews of both the Montreal Canadiens and Montreal Expos. He worked for many years on the CTV Television Network and its Montreal affiliate, CFCF-TV, where he covered a variety of sports.
- From 1998 to 2001, Gord Miller hosted That's Hockey and then returned to the broadcast booth in 2001 as the English television play-by-play voice of the Montreal Canadiens on TSN's regional feed for one season. From 1997–98 until 2001–02, Pierre McGuire served as colour commentator for the Montreal Canadiens' English-language radio broadcasts on CJAD 800 with Dino Sisto. He also worked on some of the team's regional television broadcasts on The Sports Network (TSN) when primary colour commentator Gary Green was unavailable and was a contributor to That's Hockey.
- In 2002, the Montreal Canadiens announced a deal to license its French-language broadcast rights for all of its preseason, season, and playoff games to RDS. This was controversial as it threatened the longest-running television show in Quebec, Radio-Canada's La Soirée du hockey. Days later, an agreement was reached whereby RDS and Radio-Canada would simultaneously broadcast Canadiens games on Saturday nights, saving the show. Within the province of Quebec, this arrangement stopped after the 2003–04 NHL season, and French-language Canadiens broadcasts now air exclusively on RDS. Simulcasted coverage continued in regions that do not receive RDS on analog TV (all of Canada south/west of the Ottawa region) on Radio-Canada until the 2006–07 NHL season. In June 2008, RDS's parent, CTV Inc., acquired the rights to The Hockey Theme after the CBC failed to renew its rights to the theme song. A re-orchestrated version of the tune, which has been the theme song of La Soirée du hockey and Hockey Night in Canada since 1968, has been used for hockey broadcasts on RDS and TSN beginning in the fall of 2008.
- TSN has occasionally held regional English-language rights for the Canadiens. Its most recent deal ran from 2010 through 2014. They were broadcast on a part-time TSN feed available to digital television services in the Canadiens home market, with Dave Randorf on play-by-play, alongside Dave Reid. Bell Media declined to renew its English-language rights through the 2013–14 season, although TSN Radio station CKGM still owns English radio rights, and Réseau des sports replaced its national French-language rights with regional rights for the 2014–15 season. English-language television rights to the Canadiens were acquired by Sportsnet East under a three-year contract. Prior to the 2017–18 season, TSN announced that they have reacquired the English-language rights to broadcast Canadiens games, replacing Sportsnet. John Bartlett, who handled play-by-play for Canadiens games on Sportsnet East, also moved to TSN, but returned to Sportsnet the following season. Soon after, long-time TSN talent Bryan Mudryk took over play-by-play duties.
- As reflected by its influence from Fox Sports Net (Fox also held a minority stake in the channel upon its launch), Sportsnet and its four regional feeds also picked up regional broadcast rights to other Canadian NHL teams. As of the 2013–14 NHL season, Sportsnet held regional rights to five of the seven Canadian franchises, including the Ottawa Senators, Toronto Maple Leafs (which are jointly owned by Rogers and Bell Canada through a majority stake in MLSE), Edmonton Oilers, Calgary Flames, and Vancouver Canucks. Rights to the remaining two, the Montreal Canadiens and Winnipeg Jets, and national cable rights to the league as a whole, were held by the competing network TSN. National broadcast television rights were held by CBC Television, who used its rights to broadcast the long-running Hockey Night in Canada on Saturday nights, and share coverage of the post-season with TSN (including exclusive rights to the Stanley Cup Finals).

== See also ==
- La Soirée du hockey
- LNH à RDS
- Historical NHL over-the-air television broadcasters
- List of Montreal Expos broadcasters
