= List of NHL on TSN commentating crews =

The following are the personalities who have worked for TSN Hockey over the years.

== Regular season ==
=== Play-by-play ===
- John Wells: 1986 NHL All-Star Game, occasional games until 1989
- Jim Hughson: 1986–1994^{1} (lead play-by-play announcer)
- Paul Romanuk: 1989–1994 (secondary play-by-play announcer), 1995 ^{1}–1998 (lead play-by-play announcer)
- Gord Miller: 1990–1995 (occasional games) ^{2}, 2002–present (lead play-by-play – primary Toronto Maple Leafs and Ottawa Senators play-by-play announcer since 2014)
- Dan Shulman: 1995^{1}–1998 (secondary play-by-play announcer)
- Pierre Houde: 1996–1997 (in English; remains primary French-language Montreal Canadiens commentator on RDS)
- Dennis Beyak: 1997–1998 (secondary play-by-play announcer), 2011–2022 (Winnipeg Jets play-by-play announcer)
- Vic Rauter: 2002–2003
- Dave Randorf: 2002–2014; 2010–2014 (Montreal Canadiens play-by-play announcer)
- Chris Cuthbert: 2005–2020 (secondary play-by-play announcer; 2014–2020 Toronto Maple Leafs and Ottawa Senators play-by-play announcer)
- Rod Black: 2003–2004, 2008
- Bryan Mudryk: 2018–present (Montreal Canadiens play-by-play announcer)
- Dan Robertson: 2022–present (Winnipeg Jets play-by-play announcer)
- Marshall Ferguson: 2025-present (secondary Toronto Maple Leafs and Ottawa Senators play-by-play announcer)

=== Colour commentator ===
- Howie Meeker: 1986 NHL All-Star Game, occasional games until 1998
- Roger Neilson: 1987–1989
- Gary Green: 1987–1998 (lead color commentator), 2002–2004 (secondary color commentator)
- Pierre McGuire: 2002–2011 (lead color commentator)
- Ryan Walter: 1993–1998 (secondary color commentator)
- Randy Gregg: 1995 playoffs
- Glenn Healy: 2003 playoffs, 2005–2008 (secondary color commentator)
- Ray Ferraro: 2008–2011 (secondary color commentator), 2011–2022 (lead color commentator – Toronto Maple Leafs/Ottawa Senators since 2014)
- Dave Reid: 2008–2010 (secondary color commentator), 2010–2014 (Montreal Canadiens color commentator)
- Mike Johnson: 2010–2014 (secondary color commentator), 2017–present (rotating Montreal Canadiens color commentator), 2022–present (lead color commentator – Toronto Maple Leafs/Ottawa Senators since 2022)
- Jamie McLennan: 2011–present (secondary color commentator – Toronto Maple Leafs/Ottawa Senators since 2014)
- Brian Engblom: 2011–2015 (Winnipeg Jets secondary color commentator)
- Shane Hnidy: 2011–2017 (Winnipeg Jets secondary color commentator)
- Dave Poulin: 2017–2023 (rotating Montreal Canadiens colour commentator)
- Craig Button: 2017–present (rotating Montreal Canadiens colour commentator)
- Frankie Corrado: 2024–present (rotating Montreal Canadiens colour commentator)

=== Studio host ===
- Jim Van Horne: 1986 NHL All-Star Game, 1987–1994
- John Wells: 1989–1995
- Paul Romanuk: 1987–1995 (Secondary)
- Gord Miller: 1995–1998 (Primary)
- James Duthie: 2002–present (Primary)
- Darren Dutchyshen: 2014–2024 (Secondary)

=== Studio analyst ===
- Bob McKenzie: 1986 NHL All-Star Game, 1987–2025
- Howie Meeker: 1987–1998
- Bill Watters: 1987–1989
- Mike Keenan: 1992–1993
- Glenn Healy: 2003–2008
- Darren Pang: 2006–2014
- Mike Milbury: 2007–2008
- John Tortorella: 2007–2009
- Matthew Barnaby: 2007–2016
- Barry Melrose: 2009–2023
- Ray Ferraro: 2008–2022
- Craig MacTavish: 2009–2011
- Mike Johnson: 2010–2014
- Michael Peca: 2010–2012
- Aaron Ward: 2010–2016
- Marc Crawford: 2011–2012
- Jeff O'Neill: 2011–present

=== Rinkside reporters ===
- Michael Whalen: 1987–2007 (Montreal Canadiens games)
- Ken Chilibeck: 1987–2004 (Edmonton Oilers games)
- Teresa Hergert: 1987–1990 (Calgary Flames games)
- Lisa Bowes: 1994–1997 (Calgary Flames games)
- Mark Bunting: 1994–1996 (Winnipeg Jets I games)
- Farhan Lalji: 1997–present (Vancouver Canucks games)
- Brent Wallace: 2002–2020 (Ottawa Senators games)
- Dave Randorf: 2002–2010 (Toronto Maple Leafs games)
- John Lu: 2002–2007 (Toronto Maple Leafs games), 2007–2014, 2018–2022 (Montreal Canadiens games), 2022-2025 (Winnipeg Jets games)
- Ryan Rishaug: 2005–present (Edmonton Oilers or Calgary Flames games)
- Holly Horton: 2005–2011 (Toronto Maple Leafs games)
- James Cybulski: 2006–2012 (Toronto Maple Leafs games)
- Sara Orlesky: 2007–2011 (Toronto Maple Leafs games), 2011–2022 (Winnipeg Jets games)
- Katherine Dolan: 2009–2014 (Toronto Maple Leafs games)

=== NHL insiders ===
- Bob McKenzie: 1987–2025
- Darren Dreger: 2006–present
- Pierre LeBrun: 2011–present
- Craig Button: 2012–present

== Stanley Cup playoffs ==
During the playoffs, TSN has third, fifth, seventh, and eighth choices of first-round series, second and fourth in the second round, and second in the conference finals. This means that there is the possibility of TSN covering a Canadian team during the playoffs. This happened during the 2009 Stanley Cup playoffs, as TSN televised the Calgary Flames' first-round series against the Chicago Blackhawks, but Calgary lost in six games and in the 2010 Stanley Cup playoffs when the Montreal Canadiens defeated the Washington Capitals in seven games, and the 2013 Stanley Cup playoffs when the Vancouver Canucks lost in four straight games to the San Jose Sharks.

Year	Round	Series	Games covered	Play-by-play	Colour commentator(s)
1988	Divisional semifinals	New York Islanders-New Jersey	Game 6	Jim Hughson	Gary Green and Roger Neilson
1988	Divisional semifinals	Washington-Philadelphia	Game 7	Jim Hughson	Gary Green and Roger Neilson
1988	Divisional semifinals	Edmonton-Winnipeg	Games 1–5	Jim Hughson	Gary Green and Roger Neilson
1989	Divisional semifinals	Washington-Philadelphia	Games 5–6	Jim Hughson	Gary Green and Roger Neilson
1989	Divisional semifinals	Pittsburgh-New York Rangers	Games 1–4	Jim Hughson	Gary Green and Roger Neilson
1990	Divisional semifinals	Boston-Hartford	Games 6–7	Paul Romanuk (Game 6); Jim Hughson (Game 7)	Gary Green
1990	Divisional semifinals	New York Rangers-New York Islanders	Games 1–5	Jim Hughson (Games 1–4); Paul Romanuk (Game 5)	Gary Green
1990	Divisional semifinals	Chicago-Minnesota	Game 1–7	Jim Hughson (Games 1, 3–5, 7); Paul Romanuk (Games 2, 6)	Gary Green
1991	Divisional semifinals	Pittsburgh-New Jersey	Games 1–7	Jim Hughson	Gary Green
1991	Divisional semifinals	Chicago-Minnesota	Games 1–6	Jim Hughson (Games 1, 3–6); Paul Romanuk (Game 2)	Gary Green
1991	Divisional semifinals	St. Louis-Detroit	Game 7	Jim Hughson	Gary Green
1992	Divisional semifinals	New York Rangers-New Jersey	Games 1–7	Jim Hughson	Gary Green
1992	Divisional semifinals	Detroit-Minnesota	Games 1–7	Paul Romanuk (Game 1); Jim Hughson (Games 2–7)	Gary Green
1993	Divisional semifinals	Pittsburgh-New Jersey	Games 2–5	Jim Hughson (Games 2–3, 5); Paul Romanuk (Game 4)	Gary Green
1993	Divisional semifinals	Washington-New York Islanders	Game 6	Jim Hughson	Gary Green
1993	Divisional semifinals	Boston-Buffalo	Game 1, 4	Paul Romanuk	Gary Green
1993	Divisional semifinals	Chicago-St. Louis	Games 2–4 (Game 4 was joined-in-progress for OT)	Jim Hughson (Games 2, 4); Paul Romanuk (Game 3)	Gary Green (Games 2–3); John Wells and Bob McKenzie (Game 4)
1994	First round	New York Rangers-New York Islanders	Games 1–4	Jim Hughson	Gary Green
1994	First round	Pittsburgh-Washington	Games 1–2, 4–6	Paul Romanuk (Games 1, 4); Jim Hughson (Games 2, 5–6)	Ryan Walter (Game 1); Gary Green (Games 2, 4–6)
1994	First round	Detroit-San Jose	Games 4–7	Gord Miller (Game 4); Paul Romanuk (Game 5); Jim Hughson (Games 6–7)	Ryan Walter (Games 4–5); Gary Green (Game 6); Bob McKenzie (Game 7)
1994	First round	Dallas-St. Louis	Games 2–3	Jim Hughson (Game 2); Paul Romanuk (Game 3)	Gary Green (Game 2); Ryan Walter (Game 3)
1994	First round	New Jersey-Buffalo	Games 6–7 (Game 6 was joined-in-progress for overtime and used SportsChannel New York's feed)	Mike Emrick (Game 6); Jim Hughson (Game 7)	Peter McNab (Game 6); Gary Green (Game 7)
1995	First round	Pittsburgh-Washington	Games 1–7	Paul Romanuk (Games 1–4, 6–7); Dan Shulman (Game 5)	Gary Green (Games 1–4, 6–7); Randy Gregg (Game 5)
1995	First round	Boston-New Jersey	Game 5	Paul Romanuk	Gary Green
1995	First round	Detroit-Dallas	Games 1–3, 5	Paul Romanuk	Gary Green
1996	First round	Philadelphia-Tampa Bay	Games 1–6	Paul Romanuk	Gary Green
1996	First round	Pittsburgh-Washington	Games 1–6	Paul Romanuk	Gary Green
1996	First round	Florida-Boston	Game 5	Dan Shulman	Ryan Walter
1997	First round	Philadelphia-Pittsburgh	Games 1–5	Paul Romanuk	Gary Green
1997	First round	Florida-New York Rangers	Game 5	Paul Romanuk	Gary Green
1997	First round	Colorado-Chicago	Games 1–5	Paul Romanuk (Games 1–4); Dan Shulman (Game 5)	Gary Green (Games 1–4); Ryan Walter (Game 5)
1997	First round	Detroit-St. Louis	Game 6	Paul Romanuk	Gary Green
1997	First round	Anaheim-Phoenix	Games 3, 5–7 (Games 3 and 6 was joined-in-progress and used Fox's feed, Game 5 used ESPN2's feed)	Jiggs McDonald (Games 3, 6); Dave Ryan (Game 5); Paul Romanuk (Game 7)	Peter McNab (Games 3, 6); Bobby Taylor (Game 5); Gary Green (Game 7)
1998	First round	Philadelphia-Buffalo	Games 1–5	Paul Romanuk	Gary Green
1998	First round	Colorado-Edmonton	Game 3 (used CBC's feed)	Don Wittman	John Garrett
1998	First round	Detroit-Phoenix	Games 3–6	Paul Romanuk (Games 3, 6); Dennis Beyak (Games 4–5)	Gary Green (Games 3, 6); Ryan Walter (Games 4–5)
1998	First round	St. Louis-Los Angeles	Games 1–4	Dennis Beyak	Ryan Walter
1998	First round	Dallas-San Jose	Game 6	Dennis Beyak	Ryan Walter
2003	First round	New Jersey-Boston	Games 1, 3–5	Gord Miller	Pierre McGuire
2003	First round	Tampa Bay-Washington	Games 5–6	Gord Miller	Pierre McGuire
2003	First round	Detroit-Anaheim	Games 1, 3–4	Gord Miller (Game 1); Dave Randorf (in Anaheim)	Pierre McGuire (Game 1); Gary Green (in Anaheim)
2003	First round	Colorado-Minnesota	Games 2, 4–7	Dave Randorf (Games 2, 5, 7); Gord Miller (Games 4, 6)	Gary Green (Games 2, 5, 7); Pierre McGuire (Games 4, 6)
2003	Conference semifinals	New Jersey-Tampa Bay	Games 1–5 (Game 1 used ESPN2's feed, Game 2 used ABC's feed)	Gary Thorne (Games 1–2); Vic Rauter (in Tampa Bay); Gord Miller (Game 5)	Bill Clement (Games 1–2); John Davidson (Game 2); Glenn Healy (in Tampa Bay); Pierre McGuire (Game 5)
2003	Conference semifinals	Dallas-Anaheim	Games 1–6	Gord Miller	Pierre McGuire
2003	Conference finals	Minnesota-Anaheim	Games 2–4	Gord Miller	Pierre McGuire
2004	First round	Tampa Bay-New York Islanders	Game 5 (ESPN's feed)	Dave Strader	Denis Potvin
2004	First round	Philadelphia-New Jersey	Games 1–4 (Games 2–4 used ESPN2's feed)	Dave Randorf (Game 1); JP Dellacamera (Game 2); Steve Levy (in New Jersey)	Gary Green (Game 1); Neil Smith (Game 2); Darren Pang (in New Jersey)
2004	First round	Detroit-Nashville	Games 1–5 (Game 2 used ABC's feed)	Dave Randorf (Game 1); Gary Thorne (Game 2); Gord Miller (Games 3–5)	Gary Green (Game 1); Bill Clement and John Davidson (Game 2); Pierre McGuire (Games 3–5)
2004	First round	San Jose-St. Louis	Games 1, 3, 5	Gord Miller (Games 1, 3); Dave Randorf (Game 5)	Pierre McGuire (Games 1, 3); Gary Green (Game 5)
2004	First round	Colorado-Dallas	Games 1–2, 4–5 (Game 5 used ABC's feed)	Gord Miller (Games 1–2, 4); Mike Emrick (Game 5)	Pierre McGuire (Games 1–2, 4); Brian Engblom (Game 5)
2004	Conference semifinals	San Jose-Colorado	Games 1–6 (Games 2, 5 used ABC's feed)	Gord Miller (Games 1, 3, 4, 6); Mike Emrick (Game 2); Steve Levy (Game 5)	Pierre McGuire (Games 1, 3, 4, 6); Brian Engblom (Game 2); Darren Pang (Game 5)
2004	Conference finals	Tampa Bay-Philadelphia	Games 1, 4, 6	Gord Miller	Pierre McGuire
2006	First round	New Jersey-New York Rangers	Games 1, 4 (NBC's feed)	Mike Emrick	John Davidson; Joe Micheletti (Game 1); Pierre McGuire (Game 4)
2006	First round	Buffalo-Philadelphia	Games 1–6	Gord Miller	Pierre McGuire
2006	First round	Dallas-Colorado	Games 2–4 (Game 2 was joined-in-progress)	Chris Cuthbert	Glenn Healy
2006	First round	Nashville-San Jose	Games 1–5 (Game 2 used NBC's feed)	Chris Cuthbert	Glenn Healy (Games 1, 3–5); Peter McNab and Cammi Granato (Game 2)
2006	Conference semifinals	Carolina-New Jersey	Games 1–5 (Games 1, 4 used NBC's feed)	Chris Cuthbert (Games 1–3, 5); Mike Emrick (Game 4)	Peter McNab and Cammi Granato (Game 1); Glenn Healy (Games 2–3, 5); John Davidson and Pierre McGuire (Game 4)
2006	Conference semifinals	Anaheim-Colorado	Games 1–4 (Game 2 used NBC's feed)	Gord Miller (Games 1, 3–4); Mike Emrick (Game 2)	Pierre McGuire (All games); John Davidson (Game 2)
2006	Conference finals	Carolina-Buffalo	Games 1–2, 6–7	Gord Miller	Pierre McGuire
2007	First round	Buffalo-New York Islanders	Games 1–5	Gord Miller	Pierre McGuire
2007	First round	Atlanta-New York Rangers	Games 1–4 (Game 1, 3–4 used MSG Network's feed, Game 2 used NBC's feed)	Sam Rosen (Games 1, 3–4); Dave Strader (Game 2)	Joe Micheletti (All games); Darren Pang (Game 2)
2007	First round	Anaheim-Minnesota	Games 1–5 (Games 3–5 used FSN Prime Ticket's feed)	Chris Cuthbert (Games 1–2); John Ahlers (Games 3–5)	Glenn Healy (Games 1–2); Brian Hayward (Games 3–5)
2007	First round	Nashville-San Jose	Games 1–5	Gord Miller (Games 1–2); Chris Cuthbert (Games 3–5)	Pierre McGuire (Games 1–2); Glenn Healy (Games 3–5)
2007	Conference semifinals	Buffalo-New York Rangers	Games 1–6 (Games 3, 6 used NBC's feed)	Gord Miller (Games 1–2, 4–5); Mike Emrick (Games 3, 6)	Pierre McGuire (All games); Eddie Olczyk (Games 3, 6)
2007	Conference semifinals	Detroit-San Jose	Games 1–6 (Game 2, 5 used NBC's feed)	Chris Cuthbert (Games 1, 3–4, 6); Mike Emrick (Games 2, 5)	Glenn Healy (Games 1, 3–4, 6); Eddie Olczyk and Pierre McGuire (Games 2, 5)
2007	Conference finals	Detroit-Anaheim	Games 1, 3, 5 (Game 5 used NBC's feed)	Gord Miller (Games 1, 3); Mike Emrick (Game 5)	Pierre McGuire (All games); Eddie Olczyk (Game 5)
2008	First round	Washington-Philadelphia	Games 1–7 (Games 2, 5 used NBC's feed)	Chris Cuthbert (Game 1); Mike Emrick (Games 2, 5); Gord Miller (Games 3, 4, 6, 7)	Glenn Healy (Game 1); Eddie Olczyk (Games 2, 5); Pierre McGuire (Games 2–7)
2008	First round	New Jersey-New York Rangers	Games 1–5 (Game 2 used MSG Network's feed; Game 3 used Versus' feed)	Chris Cuthbert (Games 1, 4); Sam Rosen (Game 2); John Forslund (Game 3); Gord Miller (Game 5)	Glenn Healy (Games 1, 4); Joe Micheletti (Game 2); Darren Eliot (Game 3); Pierre McGuire (Game 5)
2008	First round	Minnesota-Colorado	Games 1–2, 5	Gord Miller (Game 1); Rod Black (Game 2); Chris Cuthbert (Game 5)	Pierre McGuire (Games 1–2); Glenn Healy (Game 5)
2008	First round	Anaheim-Dallas	Games 1–6 (Game 3 used FSN Prime Ticket's feed; Game 4 used FSN Prime Ticket's feed)	Chris Cuthbert (Games 1–2, 5–6); John Ahlers (Game 3); Ralph Strangis (Game 4)	Glenn Healy (Games 1–2, 5–6); Brian Hayward (Game 3); Daryl Reaugh (Game 4)
2008	First round	Detroit-Nashville	Games 1–3 (Game 2 used NBC's feed, Game 3 used Versus' feed)	Gord Miller (Game 1); Mike Emrick (Game 2); Dave Strader (Game 3)	Pierre McGuire (Games 1–2); Eddie Olczyk (Games 2–3)
2008	Conference semifinals	San Jose-Dallas	Games 1–6	Chris Cuthbert	Glenn Healy
2008	Conference semifinals	Detroit-Colorado	Games 1–4 (Game 2 used NBC's feed)	Gord Miller (Games 1, 3); Mike Emrick (Game 2); Chris Cuthbert (Game 4)	Pierre McGuire (Games 1–3); Eddie Olczyk (Game 2); Glenn Healy (Game 4)
2008	Conference finals	Detroit-Dallas	Games 1–4	Chris Cuthbert	Glenn Healy
2009	First round	Washington-New York Rangers	Games 1–7	Gord Miller (Games 1, 3–5, 7); Mike Emrick (Games 2, 6)	Ray Ferraro (Games 1, 3–5, 7); Eddie Olczyk (Games 2, 6); Darren Pang (Game 2); Pierre McGuire (Game 6)
2009	First round	New Jersey-Carolina	Games 1–7 (Games 1–5, 7 used MSG Plus' feed, Game 6 used Versus' feed)	Mike Emrick (Games 1, 4–5, 7); Steve Cangialosi (Games 2–3); Joe Beninati (Game 6)	Chico Resch (Games 1–5, 7); Darren Eliot (Game 6)
2009	First round	Detroit-Columbus	Games 1–4 (Game 1 used Versus' feed, Games 2–4 used Fox Sports Detroit's feed)	Joe Beninati (Game 1); Ken Daniels (Games 2–4)	Darren Eliot (Game 1); Mickey Redmond and Larry Murphy (Games 2–4)
2009	First round	Chicago-Calgary	Games 1–6	Chris Cuthbert	Pierre McGuire
2009	Conference semifinals	Boston-Carolina	Games 1–7	Gord Miller	Pierre McGuire
2009	Conference semifinals	Washington-Pittsburgh	Game 6	Gord Miller	Pierre McGuire
2009	Conference semifinals	Detroit-Anaheim	Games 2–6 (Game 2 used NBC's feed)	Mike Emrick (Game 2); Chris Cuthbert (Games 3–6)	Eddie Olczyk and Darren Pang (Game 2); Ray Ferraro (Games 3–6)
2009	Conference finals	Pittsburgh-Carolina	Games 1–2	Gord Miller	Ray Ferraro and Pierre McGuire
2009	Conference finals	Detroit-Chicago	Games 1–2 (Game 1 used NBC's feed)	Mike Emrick (Game 1); Gord Miller (Game 2)	Eddie Olczyk (Game 1); Ray Ferraro and Pierre McGuire (All games)
2010	First round	Washington-Montreal	Games 1–7	Gord Miller	Pierre McGuire
2010	First round	New Jersey-Philadelphia	Games 1–5 (Game 4 used MSG Plus' feed)	Chris Cuthbert (in New Jersey); Gord Miller (Game 3); Mike Emrick (Game 4)	Ray Ferraro (in New Jersey); Pierre McGuire (Game 3); Chico Resch (Game 4)
2010	First round	Chicago-Nashville	Games 1–6 (Game 1, 4 used CSN Chicago's feed, Game 5 used NBC's feed)	Pat Foley (Games 1, 4); Chris Cuthbert (Games 2, 3, 6); Mike Emrick (Game 5)	Steve Konroyd (Game 1); Ray Ferraro (Games 2, 3, 6); Eddie Olczyk (Games 4–5); Pierre McGuire (Game 5)
2010	First round	Phoenix-Detroit	Games 1–7 (Games 1–2, 5 used Versus feed, Games 4, 6 used NBC feed)	Rick Peckham (Games 1–2, 5); Mike Emrick (Games 3, 6); Gord Miller (Game 4); Chris Cuthbert (Game 7)	Daryl Reaugh (Games 1–2, 5); Eddie Olczyk (Games 3, 6); Pierre McGuire (Games 4, 6); Ray Ferraro (Game 7)
2010	Conference semifinals	Boston-Philadelphia	Games 1–7 (Game 1 used NBC's feed)	Mike Emrick (Game 1); Gord Miller (Games 2–7)	Eddie Olczyk (Game 1); Pierre McGuire (All games)
2010	Conference semifinals	San Jose-Detroit	Games 1–5	Chris Cuthbert	Ray Ferraro
2010	Conference finals	San Jose-Chicago	Games 1–3	Mike Emrick (Game 1); Chris Cuthbert (Games 2–3)	Eddie Olczyk (Game 1); Pierre McGuire (All games); Ray Ferraro (Games 2–3)
2011	First round	Washington-New York Rangers	Games 1–5 (Games 3, 5 used NBC's feed)	Chris Cuthbert (Games 1–2, 4); Mike Emrick (Games 3, 5)	Pierre McGuire (Games 1–2, 4–5); Eddie Olczyk (Games 3, 5); Darren Pang (Game 3)
2011	First round	Philadelphia-Buffalo	Games 1–7 (Games 1, 4 used CSN Philadelphia's feed, Game 6 used NBC's feed)	Jim Jackson (Games 1, 4); Chris Cuthbert (Games 2–3, 5, 7); Mike Emrick (Game 6)	Steve Coates (Games 1, 4); Rick Tocchet (Game 1); Bill Clement (Game 4); Pierre McGuire (Games 2–3, 5, 7); Eddie Olczyk and Darren Pang (Game 6)
2011	First round	Pittsburgh-Tampa Bay	Game 7	Chris Cuthbert	Pierre McGuire
2011	First round	San Jose-Los Angeles	Games 1–6	Gord Miller	Ray Ferraro
2011	First round	Anaheim-Nashville	Games 1–6 (Games 1–2, 4 used SportsSouth's feed)	Pete Weber (Games 1–2, 4); Chris Cuthbert (Games 3, 6); Gord Miller (Game 5)	Terry Crisp (Games 1–2, 4); Pierre McGuire (Games 3, 6); Ray Ferraro (Game 5)
2011	Conference semifinals	Washington-Tampa Bay	Games 1, 3–4	Gord Miller	Pierre McGuire
2011	Conference semifinals	Philadelphia-Boston	Game 2	Gord Miller	Pierre McGuire
2011	Conference semifinals	San Jose-Detroit	Games 1–7	Chris Cuthbert	Ray Ferraro
2011	Conference finals	Boston-Tampa Bay	Games 2–4	Gord Miller	Ray Ferraro and Pierre McGuire
2012	First round	Florida-New Jersey	Games 1–7 (Game 1 used Fox Sports Florida feed, Game 2 used NBC Sports Network's feed)	Steve Goldstein (Games 1, 4–5); Rick Peckham (Game 2); Gord Miller (Games 3, 6–7)	Bill Lindsay (Games 1, 4–5); Daryl Reaugh (Game 2); Ray Ferraro (Games 3, 6–7)
2012	First round	Pittsburgh-Philadelphia	Games 1–6	Gord Miller	Ray Ferraro
2012	First round	St. Louis-San Jose	Games 1–5 (Game 1 used CNBC's feed, Game 2 used Fox Sports Midwest's feed)	Rick Peckham (Game 1); John Kelly (Game 2); Chris Cuthbert (in San Jose); Gord Miller (Game 5)	Daryl Reaugh (Game 1); Darren Pang and Bernie Federko (Game 2); Mike Johnson (in San Jose); Ray Ferraro (Game 5)
2012	First round	Phoenix-Chicago	Games 1–6	Chris Cuthbert (Games 1–3, 5–6); Gord Miller (Game 4)	Mike Johnson (Games 1–3, 5–6); Ray Ferraro (Game 4)
2012	Conference semifinals	St. Louis-Los Angeles	Games 1–4	Chris Cuthbert	Ray Ferraro
2012	Conference semifinals	Phoenix-Nashville	Games 1–5	Gord Miller	Darren Pang
2012	Conference finals	Phoenix-Los Angeles	Games 1–3	Chris Cuthbert	Ray Ferraro and Mike Johnson
2013	First Round	Pittsburgh-New York Islanders	Games 1–6 (Game 3 used NBC's feed)	Gord Miller (Games 1–2, 4–6); Dave Strader (Game 3)	Mike Johnson (Games 1–2, 4–6); Brian Engblom (Game 3)
2013	First Round	Washington-New York Rangers	Games 1–7 (Game 2 used NBC's feed)	Gord Miller (Games 1, 3–4, 6–7); Mike Emrick (Game 2); Chris Cuthbert (Game 5)	Mike Johnson (Games 1, 3–4, 6–7); Eddie Olczyk and Pierre McGuire (Game 2); Ray Ferraro (Game 5)
2013	First Round	Anaheim-Detroit	Games 1–7 (Game 2 and 3 used NBCSN's feed; Game 4 was joined-in-progress and used CNBC's feed; Game 6 also used CNBC's feed)	Chris Cuthbert (Games 1, 5, 7); John Forslund (Game 2); Rick Peckham (Games 3 & 4); Dave Strader (Game 6)	Ray Ferraro (Games 1, 5, 7); Daryl Reaugh (Game 2); Joe Micheletti (Game 3); Eddie Olczyk (Game 4); Brian Engblom (Game 6)
2013	First Round	Vancouver-San Jose	Games 1–4	Chris Cuthbert	Ray Ferraro
2013	Conference Semifinals	Boston-New York Rangers	Games 1–5 (Game 2 used NBC's feed)	Gord Miller (Games 1, 3–5); Dave Strader (Game 2)	Mike Johnson (Games 1, 3–5); Pierre McGuire (Game 2)
2013	Conference Semifinals	Los Angeles-San Jose	Games 1–7	Chris Cuthbert	Ray Ferraro
2013	Conference Finals	Chicago-Los Angeles	Games 1–3	Gord Miller	Ray Ferraro and Mike Johnson
2014	First Round	Boston-Detroit	Games 1–5 (Games 2 & 5 used NBC's feed)	Gord Miller (Games 1, 3–4); Mike Emrick (Game 2); Dave Strader (Game 5)	Ray Ferraro (Games 1, 3–4); Eddie Olczyk and Pierre McGuire (Games 2 & 5)
2014	First Round	New York Rangers-Philadelphia	Games 1–7 (Games 2 & 5 used NBC's feed; Game 3 simulcasted with Sportsnet 360 and used CNBC's feed)	Gord Miller (Games 1, 4, 6–7); Kenny Albert (Games 2 & 5); Dave Strader (Game 3)	Ray Ferraro (Games 1, 4, 6–7); Joe Micheletti (Game 2); Brian Engblom (Games 3 & 5)
2014	First Round	Colorado-Minnesota	Games 1–7 (Games 1 & 4 used CNBC's feed)	John Forslund (Games 1, 4); Chris Cuthbert (Games 2, 6–7); Gord Miller (Games 3, 5)	Tripp Tracy (Games 1, 4); Mike Johnson (Games 2, 6–7); Ray Ferraro (Games 3, 5)
2014	First Round	Anaheim-Dallas	Games 1–6	Chris Cuthbert	Mike Johnson
2014	Conference Semifinals	Chicago-Minnesota	Games 1–6 (Game 2 used NBC's feed)	Gord Miller (Games 1, 3–6); Mike Emrick (Game 2)	Mike Johnson (Games 1, 3–6); Eddie Olczyk and Pierre McGuire (Game 2)
2014	Conference Semifinals	Anaheim-Los Angeles	Games 1–7	Chris Cuthbert	Ray Ferraro
2014	Conference Finals	Chicago-Los Angeles	Games 1–2, 4	Chris Cuthbert	Ray Ferraro and Mike Johnson

=== Notes ===
- 1988 – TSN aired the Edmonton-Winnipeg playoff series nationally under the Carling O'Keefe banner, except for Edmonton and Winnipeg markets where CBC retained exclusive rights through Molson exclusivity.
- 1998 – Due to the television premiere of the film Apollo 13, Game 3 of the Colorado-Edmonton playoff series was seen on both CBC and TSN, using CBC's feed. CBC's end of the deal was regionally televised in Western Canada, while TSN broadcast the game in Eastern Canada.
- 2003 – Game 2 of the New Jersey–Boston was not televised as TSN instead, aired the World Curling Championships from Winnipeg.
  - Game 3 of the Detroit-Anaheim series was joined-in-progress after the completion of WWE Raw. Likewise, Game 6 of the Dallas-Anaheim series was joined in progress after the completion of WWE Raw.

== Notes ==
1. Jim Hughson left TSN during the 1994–95 NHL lockout. When the season resumed, Paul Romanuk succeeded Hughson as TSN's lead play-by-play announcer, and Gord Miller and/or Dan Shulman succeeded Romanuk as the network's secondary announcer.
2. In 1993, Gord Miller filled in for Jim Hughson after his father died.
