= TSN Hockey =

Regional NHL broadcasts by Canadian sports channel TSN

- The TSN Hockey logo, used since 2014.
- Also known as: Leafs on TSN; Sens on TSN; Jets on TSN; Habs on TSN (2011–2014; 2017–present); NHL on TSN (2002–2014); The NHL Tonight on TSN (1987–1998); TSN Wednesday Night Hockey; Scotiabank Wednesday Night Hockey
- Genre: Sports
- Starring: Various
- Opening theme: "The Hockey Theme"
- Composer: Dolores Claman
- Country of origin: Canada

Production
- Production locations: CFTO Studios, Toronto

Original release
- Network: TSN
- Release: 1987 – present

Related
- NHL on Sportsnet; NHL on CTV; NHL on ESPN; NHL on TNT

TSN Hockey (formerly the NHL on TSN and The NHL Tonight on TSN) is the blanket title used by TSN's broadcasts of the National Hockey League.

After holding the Canadian national cable rights to the NHL from 1985 to 1998 and again from 2002 to 2014, it was announced in November 2013 that TSN and Bell Media had lost these rights to Rogers Communications and Sportsnet as part of an exclusive, twelve-year media rights deal that took effect in the 2014–15 NHL season. In August 2014, following its loss of national NHL rights, TSN split its singular national feed into four regional channels (itself an imitation of the structure of Sportsnet), allowing the network to air its regional NHL games on the main TSN feeds, still subject to blackout, rather than on part-time channels. With these changes, TSN will only broadcast regional NHL games for the foreseeable future; however, its regional coverage expanded in the 2014 season—while losing the Montreal Canadiens to Sportsnet, TSN added regional coverage of the Ottawa Senators and Toronto Maple Leafs, alongside its existing rights to Winnipeg Jets games.

The TSN Hockey name is used primarily as a blanket title for TSN's regional NHL coverage, and national segments featuring its analysts, and not used as the on-air title of the broadcasts themselves, which are branded as Leafs on TSN, Sens on TSN, Jets on TSN, and Habs on TSN respectively.

== Regional broadcasts ==
=== Toronto Maple Leafs ===
TSN began airing Toronto Maple Leafs games regionally, presented by Molson as Molson Canadian Leafs Hockey, in the 1998–99 season, when they first lost the national contract. The package was originally for 30 games, but reduced to 17 once TSN re-acquired the national rights in 2002. Ten of those games were ones that TSN acquired from the NHL to air nationally. The other seven, TSN acquired from the Maple Leafs as regional games. However, TSN eventually came to an agreement with the other five Canadian clubs to air these games nationally. Originally Joe Bowen and Harry Neale called the regional Leafs telecasts in the booth, with Glenn Healy serving as ice-level reporter from 2005–06 to 2006–07 season, when their deal expired, and from the 2007–08 season through 2013–14, every Maple Leafs game on TSN was broadcast as a national NHL on TSN game.

Beginning in the 2014–15 season, owing to Bell Canada's ownership stake in the Leafs' owner, Maple Leaf Sports & Entertainment and the loss of TSN's national cable rights, TSN began to air 26 regional games per season, split with Sportsnet Ontario, and aired by TSN4.

=== Ottawa Senators ===
On January 29, 2014, the Ottawa Senators announced a new, 12-year regional broadcasting deal with Bell Media that took effect in the 2014–15 season; TSN5 began to air regional Ottawa Senators games beginning in the 2014–15 season. The deal also included an extension of Bell's radio rights with CFGO, and French-language regional television rights for Réseau des sports.

=== Winnipeg Jets ===
Upon their return to the city, TSN began broadcasting regional Winnipeg Jets games beginning in 2011, under a 10-year media rights deal with Bell Media that also included radio rights for co-owned CFRW. Winnipeg Jets games not televised nationally by the NHL's national broadcast partners are broadcast by TSN3, and are available in Manitoba, Saskatchewan, Nunavut, the Northwest Territories, and parts of Northwestern Ontario.

Regional Jets games were previously carried by TSN Jets, a part-time multiplex channel of TSN exclusive to the Jets' market. The TSN Jets channel was a subscription-based premium service, costing $9.95 CAD per-month during the NHL season, but was available on a free preview basis for the start of the inaugural season. Despite the fee, representatives from both MTS and Shaw Cable stated that "thousands" of their customers had subscribed to the Jets channel. On August 18, 2014, TSN officially confirmed that the TSN Jets feed would be discontinued, and that regional Jets games would be moved to the new TSN3 channel for the 2014–15 season.

=== Montreal Canadiens ===
TSN's previous deal with the Canadiens ran from 2010 through 2014. They were broadcast on a part-time TSN feed available to digital television services in the Canadiens home market, with Dave Randorf on play-by-play, alongside Dave Reid. Bell Media declined to renew its English-language rights through the 2013–14 season, although TSN Radio station CKGM still owns English radio rights, and Réseau des sports replaced its national French-language rights with regional rights for the 2014–15 season. English-language television rights to the Canadiens were acquired by Sportsnet East under a three-year contract.

Prior to the 2017–18 season, TSN announced that they had reacquired the English-language rights to broadcast Canadiens games, replacing Sportsnet, and now airing on TSN2. John Bartlett, who handled play-by-play for Canadiens games on Sportsnet East, also moved to TSN, but returned to Sportsnet the following season. Soon after, long-time TSN talent Bryan Mudryk took over play-by-play duties.

== Past coverage ==
=== National games ===
TSN owned the national cable rights to the NHL in Canada from 1987 through 1998, after which what was then called CTV Sportsnet purchased the national cable rights to NHL games. Prior to this, TSN's NHL coverage was sparse as they only acquired games a la carte. From 1987–88 to 1997–98, they usually showed games twice per week through the regular season and in the first round of the playoffs they provided extensive coverage of series not involving Canadian-based teams. TSN was the first ever holder of cable rights to the NHL in Canada, although the task of acquiring these rights were complicated by contradicting statements by CBC that it did own the cable rights to the NHL, along with the involvement of competing beer company Molson in Canadian NHL rights at the time (TSN was founded by its competitor, Labatt). With the help of a Molson employee who was a friend of TSN's founder Gordon Craig, a deal was reached between TSN, Molson, and the NHL.

TSN's most recent period as national rightsholder lasted from 2002 to 2014. During this period, TSN usually televised three or four games per week during the regular season, with its flagship broadcast, Wednesday Night Hockey, airing on Wednesdays. In some cases, TSN took the American feed of the game (i.e. ESPN/ESPN2, NBC, OLN, Versus or the US RSNs) if it didn't involve a Canadian team.

Starting with the 2009 Stanley Cup Playoffs, TSN had third, fifth, seventh, and eighth choices of first-round series, third and fourth in the second round, and second in the Conference Finals. These changes allowed TSN to broadcast playoff games involving Canadian teams, such as at the 2009 Stanley Cup Playoffs, as TSN televised the Calgary Flames' first-round series against the Chicago Blackhawks, the 2010 Stanley Cup Playoffs when the Montreal Canadiens defeated the Washington Capitals in seven games, and the 2013 Stanley Cup Playoffs when the Vancouver Canucks lost in four straight games to the San Jose Sharks.

In January 2015, after it was announced that the NHL-organized World Cup of Hockey would be revived in 2016, Bell Media attempted to make a bid of nearly $32 million for its Canadian broadcast rights during a blind auction. However, broadcast rights to the tournament were instead awarded to Rogers; although Bell Media representatives refused to elaborate, the company believed that Rogers' national rights to the NHL had contained provisions allowing the company to match outside offers for such events.

The 1986 Canadian coverage of the NHL All-Star Game was to be provided by CTV. However, CTV had a prior commitment to carry a U.S. miniseries. As a result, TSN took over coverage of the game in Hartford.

== On-air staff ==
James Duthie serves as the lead in-studio host with analysts including Darren Dreger and Pierre LeBrun. Laura Diakun is a secondary studio host, primarily working on Canadiens games. Craig Button, Dave Poulin, Mike Johnson, Glenn Schiiler, and Aaron Ward also contribute periodically in the studio. Mark Masters (Maple Leafs), John Lu (Jets), and Kenzie Lalonde (Canadiens) serve as in-arena hosts.

Gord Miller does play-by-play for both Toronto Maple Leafs and Ottawa Senators regional games. Mike Johnson primarily works Maple Leafs games while Jamie McLennan and Dave Poulin serve as colour commentators for a majority of Sens games. In some instances where both the Maple Leafs and Senators either play each other or were assigned a game on TSN on the same day, Miller would call the Maple Leafs game while Dustin Nielson would call the Senators game. On Winnipeg Jets broadcasts, Dan Robertson does play-by-play and Landon Ferraro provides colour commentary. For Montreal Canadiens regional games, Bryan Mudryk work play-by-play duties while colour commentary is rotated between Dave Poulin, Frank Corrado, Mike Johnson, and Craig Button.

Miller, Dennis Beyak, Johnson, and Button are also assigned to work the World Junior Championships in January. During their absences, McLennan and an alternate play-by-play announcer would work both Maple Leafs and Senators games, with Mudryk substituting on occasional Senators games. Sean Campbell would replace Mudryk on its television broadcasts.

=== Former staff ===
The studio hosts were Jim Van Horne (1985–1994), John Wells (1989–1995), and Gord Miller (1995–1998), with Bob McKenzie providing studio analysis. Lead play-by-play broadcasters were Wells (1985–86), Jim Hughson (1986–1994), and Paul Romanuk (1994–1998). Color commentators were Howie Meeker and Bobby Orr (1985–86), Roger Neilson (1987–1989), and Gary Green (1987–1998). Meeker was also often part of the game-night crew, providing highlights and analysis with the telestrator.

When TSN re-acquired the national cable rights to the NHL in 2002, Pierre McGuire was hired as its lead color commentator. After the 2011 NHL Draft, it was announced McGuire had taken a full-time position as a reporter for NBC Sports, effective as of the 2011–12 season. McGuire still makes occasional appearances as an analyst during TSN's hockey coverage and on TSN Radio.

Other broadcasters used by TSN include play-by-play announcers Dan Shulman (1994–1998), Pierre Houde (1996–97), Vic Rauter (2002–2003), Dave Randorf (2002–2014), and Chris Cuthbert (2005–2020); and colour commentators Ryan Walter (1993–1998), Randy Gregg (1994–1995), Glenn Healy (2003–08), and Ray Ferraro (2008–2022).

=== Staff changes after losing national rights to Rogers ===
After the NHL announced that it had accepted Rogers' bid over TSN's to take over national cable rights, news sources such as the Toronto Star and the National Post speculated on where TSN's hockey personalities (such as James Duthie, Bob McKenzie, Darren Dreger, Chris Cuthbert, and Gord Miller) would end up. Initially, Rogers was only able to lure Dave Randorf and Mike Johnson among TSN's major personalities. However, Mike Johnson re-joined TSN in September 2017 after being terminated by Rogers Media on August 10, 2016, and would later make appearances on American television for NHL Network and NBC Sports. Despite getting offers from Rogers, Duthie instead signed a long-term contract with TSN. In addition, not only did McKenzie, Dreger, Cuthbert, and Miller also decide to stay with TSN, but all four started to appear on a regular basis south of the border on NBC's hockey coverage (McKenzie, Dreger, and Cuthbert officially joined NBC, while Miller, who did occasional play-by-play work for NBC since 2011, saw an increased role). Cuthbert moved to Sportsnet in 2020.

After ESPN/ABC (a part-owner of TSN) reacquired the American NHL national rights in 2021, the network added Ray Ferraro as one of its lead analysts (alongside former NBC talent Brian Boucher). Ferraro continued to work on TSN's Maple Leafs broadcasts while appearing concurrently on ESPN until 2022.

== Theme song ==
In June 2008, CTVglobemedia acquired the rights to "The Hockey Theme" after the CBC failed to renew its rights to the theme song. A re-orchestrated version of the tune, which had been the theme song of Hockey Night in Canada for forty years, has been used for hockey broadcasts on TSN and RDS since the fall of 2008.

TSN announced on the September 24, 2008 edition of SportsCentre the debut date for the song. It began on October 14, when the Colorado Avalanche visited the Calgary Flames.

Preceded by none	NHL English pay television carrier in Canada; 1987 - 1998	Succeeded by CTV Sportsnet
Preceded by CTV Sportsnet	NHL English pay television carrier in Canada; 2002 - 2014	Succeeded by Sportsnet
