= Ray Ferraro =

Canadian ice hockey player & broadcaster (born 1964)

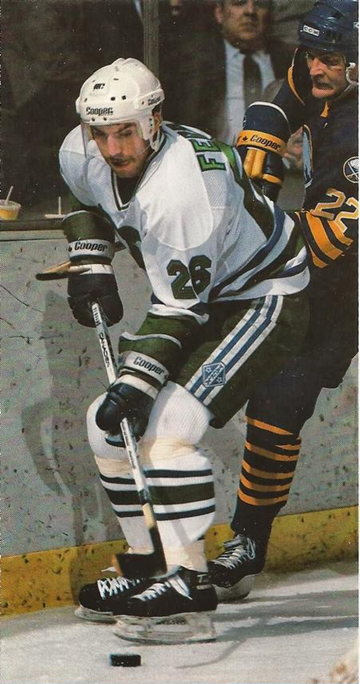
- Born: August 23, 1964 (age 62) Trail, British Columbia, Canada
- Height: 5 ft 10 in (178 cm)
- Weight: 192 lb (87 kg; 13 st 10 lb)
- Position: Centre
- Shot: Left
- Played for: Hartford Whalers; New York Islanders; New York Rangers; Los Angeles Kings; Atlanta Thrashers; St. Louis Blues
- National team: Canada
- NHL draft: 88th overall, 1982; Hartford Whalers
- Playing career: 1984–2002

Raymond Vincent Ferraro (born August 23, 1964) is a Canadian former professional ice hockey player and current broadcaster for ESPN/ABC and select Vancouver Canucks games on CBC Sports/Sportsnet. He played for 18 seasons in the National Hockey League (NHL) for the Hartford Whalers (1984–1990), New York Islanders (1990–1995), New York Rangers (1995–1996), Los Angeles Kings (1996–1999), Atlanta Thrashers (1999–2002), and St. Louis Blues (2002).

== Playing career ==
Ferraro was a prolific scorer in junior hockey, including a 108-goal and 192-point season for the Western Hockey League (WHL)'s Brandon Wheat Kings in 1983–84. He also was a member of the 1982–83 Portland Winter Hawks squad that won the 1983 Memorial Cup, becoming the first American team to win the Cup. Ferraro's teammates on the championship-winning team included Cam Neely, Mike Vernon, Brian Curran, John Kordic, and other future NHLers. He was inducted into the BC Sports Hall of Fame in 2025.

Although nicknamed "The Big Ball of Hate", he scored 408 goals and 490 assists for a total of 898 points in 1,258 NHL games spanning 18 seasons. He was named to the NHL All-Star Game in 1992, held in Philadelphia. He also had two 40-goal seasons, and (as of April 2025) ranks 103rd all-time in total NHL goals scored. Ferraro had a memorable Stanley Cup playoff run for the New York Islanders in 1993, scoring two overtime goals against the Washington Capitals as the Islanders defeated both the Capitals and the defending champion Pittsburgh Penguins. Ferraro assisted on David Volek's game- and series-winning goal during overtime of Game 7 against the Penguins. The goal advanced the Islanders to the Wales Conference Finals, which they lost to the eventual champion Montreal Canadiens. Ferraro finished that playoff season with team-leading totals in goals (13) and points (20).

On February 28, 1999, he played in his 1,000th game. He signed as a free agent for the Atlanta Thrashers that year. He played three seasons (while being named captain in 2001). He recorded his 400th goal on December 28, 2001. He was traded to the St. Louis Blues in March 2002 for a fourth-round draft pick, where he recorded six goals in 15 games. He closed his career out with three assists for the Blues in the 2002 Stanley Cup playoffs. Prior to retiring, Ferraro served as an analyst for ESPN's playoff coverage in 1999. Among all players with at least 400 goals, Ferraro ranked sixth in shooting percentage with 18.9%. In his career, Ferraro had twelve seasons with at least 20 goals.

== Broadcasting ==
Ferraro retired from the NHL on August 2, 2002. He has worked for ESPN hockey broadcasts, including on NHL 2Night with John Buccigross and Barry Melrose, where he began working while still an active player. On that show, Ferraro was often referred to as "Chicken Parm" by Buccigross after an accident with Chicken Parmesan moments before going on the air. He later worked as a studio analyst for the NHL on NBC, as a colour commentator on Edmonton Oilers broadcasts on Rogers Sportsnet West, and on Sportsnet's other hockey programs.

Ferraro works as a colour commentator and studio analyst for TSN Hockey, including the 2010 Winter Olympics for CTV. After Pierre McGuire left TSN for NBC/Versus, he became the lead colour commentator. After Rogers Media, the parent of TSN's rival Sportsnet, gained the national NHL rights with effect in the 2014–15 NHL season, Ferraro became a colour commentator for the network's regional NHL telecasts, primarily working Toronto Maple Leafs games.

On May 5, 2014, EA Sports announced that Ferraro would be an "Inside-the-Glass" reporter for NHL 15 along with play-by-play commentator Mike Emrick and colour commentator Eddie Olczyk. The trio worked together for five years. On November 23, 2015, Ferraro became the first hockey broadcaster to broadcast a game where his child also played in the same game, with the Toronto Maple Leafs hosting the Boston Bruins at the Air Canada Centre.

During the 2019 NHL Awards, Ferraro was promoted to lead color commentator in NHL 20. Also in 2019, he and Darren Dreger started a podcast, The Ray and Dregs Hockey Podcast, hosted by TSN.

On April 7, 2008, Ferraro returned to ESPN to call his first-ever Frozen Four as a replacement for Barry Melrose, who left ESPN to coach the Tampa Bay Lightning. With Ferraro switching from NBC to ESPN, there have been repeated rumours that the lead team of Gary Thorne and Bill Clement might re-partner at ESPN as well.

With ESPN regaining the rights to air NHL games, Ferraro returned to ESPN/ABC for the 2021–22 season, this time as lead colour commentator, sharing with Brian Boucher. That season also saw him work him work his first ever Stanley Cup Finals series as a colour commentator at his ice-level analyst position. He teamed with Sean McDonough and Emily Kaplan for the entire series. Ferraro left TSN after the season to focus on his work at ESPN/ABC and after Boucher left the network for TNT, he became the lead colour commentator on August 29, 2023.

On September 19, 2023, Sportsnet announced that Ferraro will be a colour commentator for the Vancouver Canucks regional broadcasts on Sportsnet for select games and that Dave Tomlinson will call most Canucks games. He co-hosts a podcast with Darren Dreger called the Ray & Dregs Hockey Podcast.

== Personal life ==
As a youngster, Ferraro played in the 1976 Little League World Series.

Ferraro currently lives in Vancouver, British Columbia with his wife Cammi Granato (married in 2004).

Ray has four sons, Matt and Landon from a previous marriage, as well as Riley (born December, 2006) and Reese (born December, 2009) with Cammi.

His brothers-in-law are former NHL head coaches Tony Granato and Don Granato.

Ferraro was inducted into the BC Sports Hall of Fame in 2024.

== Transactions ==
- June 9, 1982 — Drafted by the Hartford Whalers in the fifth round (88th overall)
- November 13, 1990 — Traded by the Hartford Whalers to the New York Islanders in exchange for Doug Crossman
- August 9, 1995 — Signed as a free agent with the New York Rangers
- March 14, 1996 — Traded by the New York Rangers, along with Ian Laperrière, Nathan LaFayette, Mattias Norström and New York's 1997 fourth-round draft choice (Tomi Kallarsson), to the Los Angeles Kings in exchange for Jari Kurri, Marty McSorley and Shane Churla
- August 9, 1999 – Signed as a free agent with the Atlanta Thrashers
- March 18, 2002 — Traded by the Atlanta Thrashers to the St. Louis Blues in exchange for a 2002 fourth-round draft choice

== Video games ==
Ferraro was the color analyst for EA Sports' hockey video games from 2014 to 2023. He was the ice level reporter starting in NHL 15, working with NBC Sports' Mike Emrick and Eddie Olczyk. He partnered with new play-by-play man James Cybulski, starting with NHL 20 through NHL 23. Starting with NHL 24, Ferraro was replaced by Cheryl Pounder.

== Career statistics ==
=== Regular season and playoffs ===
			Regular season					Playoffs
Season	Team	League	GP	G	A	Pts	PIM	GP	G	A	Pts	PIM
1980–81	Trail Smoke Eaters	KIJHL	40	86	1	1	0	—	—	—	—	—
1981–82	Penticton Knights	BCJHL	48	65	70	135	90	—	—	—	—	—
1982–83	Portland Winter Hawks	WHL	50	41	49	90	39	14	14	10	24	13
1982–83	Portland Winter Hawks	MC	—	—	—	—	—	4	1	2	3	4
1983–84	Brandon Wheat Kings	WHL	72	108	84	192	84	11	13	15	28	20
1984–85	Binghamton Whalers	AHL	37	20	13	33	29	—	—	—	—	—
1984–85	Hartford Whalers	NHL	44	11	17	28	40	—	—	—	—	—
1985–86	Hartford Whalers	NHL	76	30	47	77	57	10	3	6	9	4
1986–87	Hartford Whalers	NHL	80	27	32	59	42	6	1	1	2	8
1987–88	Hartford Whalers	NHL	68	21	29	50	81	6	1	1	2	6
1988–89	Hartford Whalers	NHL	80	41	35	76	86	4	2	0	2	4
1989–90	Hartford Whalers	NHL	79	25	29	54	109	7	0	3	3	2
1990–91	Hartford Whalers	NHL	15	2	5	7	18	—	—	—	—	—
1990–91	New York Islanders	NHL	61	19	16	35	52	—	—	—	—	—
1991–92	New York Islanders	NHL	80	40	40	80	92	—	—	—	—	—
1992–93	Capital District Islanders	AHL	1	0	2	2	2	—	—	—	—	—
1992–93	New York Islanders	NHL	46	14	13	27	40	18	13	7	20	18
1993–94	New York Islanders	NHL	82	21	32	53	83	4	1	0	1	6
1994–95	New York Islanders	NHL	47	22	21	43	30	—	—	—	—	—
1995–96	New York Rangers	NHL	65	25	29	54	82	—	—	—	—	—
1995–96	Los Angeles Kings	NHL	11	4	2	6	10	—	—	—	—	—
1996–97	Los Angeles Kings	NHL	81	25	21	46	112	—	—	—	—	—
1997–98	Los Angeles Kings	NHL	40	6	9	15	42	3	0	1	1	2
1998–99	Los Angeles Kings	NHL	65	13	18	31	59	—	—	—	—	—
1999–2000	Atlanta Thrashers	NHL	81	19	25	44	88	—	—	—	—	—
2000–01	Atlanta Thrashers	NHL	81	29	47	76	91	—	—	—	—	—
2001–02	Atlanta Thrashers	NHL	61	8	19	27	66	—	—	—	—	—
2001–02	St. Louis Blues	NHL	15	6	4	10	8	10	0	3	3	4
NHL totals			1,258	408	490	898	1,288	68	21	22	43	54

=== International ===
Year	Team	Event	GP	G	A	Pts	PIM
1989	Canada	WC	9	1	5	6	8
1992	Canada	WC	6	2	1	3	6
1996	Canada	WC	8	0	4	4	2
Senior totals			23	3	10	13	16

== Awards ==
- Bob Brownridge Memorial Trophy (WHL leading scorer) – 1984
- WHL East First All-Star Team – 1984
- Bob Nystrom Award – 1992

== See also ==
- Captain (ice hockey)
- List of NHL players with 1,000 games played

Preceded by Steve Staios	Atlanta Thrashers captain 2001–02	Succeeded by Shawn McEachern
