= Chris Cuthbert =

Canadian play-by-play sportscaster

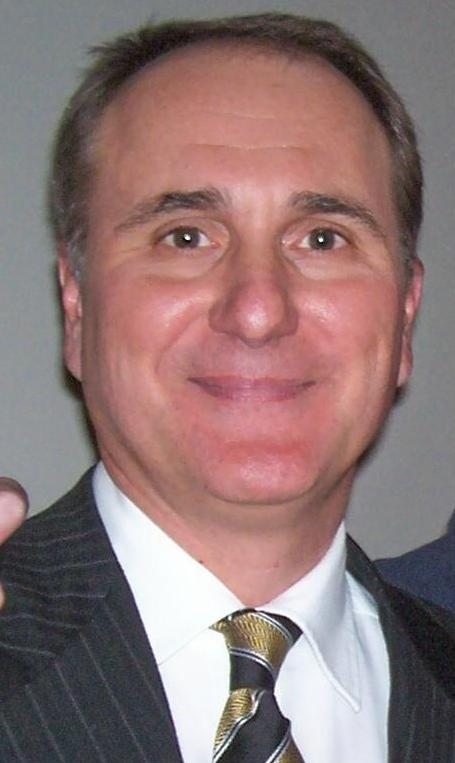
- Cuthbert in 2007
- Born: September 20, 1957 (age 69); Brampton, Ontario, Canada
- Education: Queen's University
- Sports commentary career
- Genre: Play-by-play
- Sports: Canadian football, ice hockey, figure skating

Chris Cuthbert (born September 20, 1957) is a Canadian sportscaster. Since 2021, he has served as the lead play-by-play commentator with CBC Sports/Sportsnet for Hockey Night in Canada, calling most national and regional games for the Toronto Maple Leafs on the network. Formerly, he worked for TSN, NBC, and CBC Sports in a multitude of roles from 1984 to 2020. He and Glen Suitor were the lead broadcast team for the CFL on TSN from 2008 to 2019 before Cuthbert gave that lead play-by-play role to Rod Smith.

He was the lead play-by-play voice for ice hockey at the 2010 Winter Olympics in Vancouver, British Columbia, Canada for CTV, where he worked alongside Pierre McGuire, who also worked the tournament for NBC, and Ray Ferraro. He and Ferraro also called 2018 Winter Olympics in PyeongChang, including the bronze medal match between Canada and the Czech Republic and the gold medal match between Russia and Germany.

== Biography ==
=== Early life ===
Cuthbert was born and raised in Brampton and graduated from Brampton Centennial Secondary School. He later graduated from Queen's University.

=== CBC ===
After almost five years at CJAD Radio in Montreal, the last two as sports director, Cuthbert joined CBC Sports in 1984, where he anchored regional western games for Hockey Night in Canada, usually from Edmonton. He also got spot play-by-play work when the network's primary western broadcaster, Don Wittman, was covering other events for the network, or when the schedule load necessitated it.

He got his big break during the 1988 Stanley Cup playoffs. On April 18, he was a reporter in Washington, providing brief and periodic reports of the Washington Capitals–New Jersey Devils game to the national CBC viewing audience watching the Canadian network's game broadcast from Montreal (the Canadiens against the Boston Bruins). A power outage struck the Montreal area, which ended the telecast from that city, and CBC was forced to turn to Cuthbert in Washington to provide the full broadcast – play-by-play, analyst, and host. The broadcast was totally done off the cuff. In other words, there were no regular analysts, graphics, or replay capabilities. His effort caught the network's attention, earned him a nomination for a Gemini Award, and launched a successful broadcasting career.

Cuthbert rose to a sportscaster for CBC, where he called Olympic sports, figure skating, Canadian football, and NHL hockey. He became the secondary play-by-play voice of CFL on CBC behind Don Wittman in 1992 and eventually became the lead play-by-play voice, broadcasting the Grey Cup Championship each November from 1996 to 2004. His most notable work was Hockey Night in Canada (HNIC) games primarily involving the Montreal Canadiens or NHL teams from Western Canada. In the era of the CBC's Hockey Night in Canada double-headers, Cuthbert usually called the late games. He was assigned to a conference final every year in the play-by-play role from 1993 until 2004.

==== Departure from CBC ====
Cuthbert's contract was terminated by the CBC on February 24, 2005, by CBC Sports executive director Nancy Lee while the network endured the 2004–05 NHL lockout. There was much outrage over his firing, similar to that of Ron MacLean who had almost threatened to leave the network over stalled contract negotiations, as many believed he'd be the successor to Bob Cole. Some criticized Lee, who had created the position Manager of Program Acquisitions for CBC Sports to hire her friend Sue Prestedge a year earlier, despite the looming threat of the NHL lockout. It was also believed that Cuthbert's strong opposition, when CBC chose to drop its popular Hockey Day in Canada broadcast, did not endear himself to Lee. This decision was widely criticized, as rival network TSN staged a Hockey Day of its own.

=== TSN and NBC ===
After joining TSN in the spring of 2005, Cuthbert became TSN's lead CFL football voice, replacing TSN-original John Wells. Coincidentally, Cuthbert got his job at CBC in 1984 when Wells left the network to join the fledgling TSN. When TSN gained the exclusive television rights to the CFL starting in 2008, Cuthbert returned to his role as the primary voice of the CFL on TSN and called every Grey Cup during his TSN tenure.

After joining TSN in 2005, he served as their secondary hockey play-by-play voice. In the 2005–06 and 2006–07 seasons, he also worked for NBC alongside colour commentator Peter McNab for both seasons. "Inside-the-Glass" reporter Cammi Granato joined the pair 2005–06, and Darren Pang replaced Granato in 2006–07. As a result of Rogers Media's acquisition of the national exclusive rights to the NHL in 2014, he became part of TSN's broadcasts of Ottawa Senators and Toronto Maple Leafs regional games, as well as returning for NHL assignments on NBC and NBCSN, often calling the first two rounds of the playoffs.

He made National Hockey League history on December 1, 2006 as the first play-by-play announcer in NHL history to intentionally broadcast a game from ice level, rather than a broadcast booth. Along with Glenn Healy, he called the Buffalo Sabres/New York Rangers game at HSBC Arena in Buffalo, New York. According to The Globe and Mail, "it was a good show and it's unlikely to be the last." He and Healy did the same thing again on November 16, 2007 when he called the Sabres/Montreal Canadiens game at the same arena with Pierre McGuire provided additional analysis from the broadcast booth as an "eye in the sky" while on December 17, 2008, he did this role with Ray Ferraro.

==== 2010 Winter Olympics ====
He was the lead play-by-play announcer for men's ice hockey at the 2010 Winter Olympics in Vancouver for CTV with Pierre McGuire, who also worked the tournament for NBC, and his partner Ray Ferraro. He and McGuire announcing the gold medal game between Canada and the United States. Just before Canada's Sidney Crosby scored the gold medal-winning goal seven minutes and forty seconds into overtime, Cuthbert said:

Pavelski shot, that's saved by Luongo. Niedermayer regroups, Crosby over the line, Sidney Crosby can't bust in, up with it again he's on the ice with Iginla. Iginla- Crosby scores! Sidney Crosby! The golden goal! And Canada has once-in-a-lifetime Olympic gold!

He then later added:

"These golden games have their crowning moment."

==== 2018 Winter Olympics ====
Cuthbert and Ferraro returned to be the lead broadcast team for men's ice hockey at the 2018 Winter Olympics in PyeongChang. The pair most notably called the bronze medal match between Canada and the Czech Republic and the gold medal match between Russia and Germany.

=== Sportsnet ===
In June 2020, Cuthbert moved from TSN to Sportsnet. He said that he made the change because he will be almost 70 years old by the time that Rogers/Sportsnet's national contract with the NHL expires in 2026, and there was no guarantee that he will have any more opportunity to call Hockey Night in Canada games again. Cuthbert called the 2020 Western Conference playoffs with Louie DeBrusk, and he called the 2021 Montreal Canadiens playoff run, including the 2021 Stanley Cup Finals alongside Craig Simpson.

After Jim Hughson retired from broadcasting, Cuthbert took his place as the lead announcer for Sportsnet and Hockey Night in Canada alongside Simpson, starting with the 2021–22 NHL season.

== Legacy ==
In 1998, Cuthbert won a Gemini Award for Best Sports Broadcaster, and in 2004, was recognized by Sports Media Canada as Sportscaster of the Year. In 2006, Cuthbert received another Gemini, this time with his TSN CFL colour commentator, Glen Suitor, for Best Sports Play-by-Play or Analyst. In 2014, Cuthbert was inducted into the media wing of the Canadian Football Hall of Fame. A resident of Brampton, he was inducted into the Brampton Sports Hall of Fame in 2003. In June 2026, Cuthbert was awarded the Foster Hewitt Memorial Award for "outstanding contributions as a hockey broadcaster", a career which began in 1984. As a child, Cuthbert listened to Hewitt on the radio, whom was one of his inspirations for becoming a broadcaster.
