= Mike Emrick =

American ice hockey commentator

Mike "Doc" Emrick
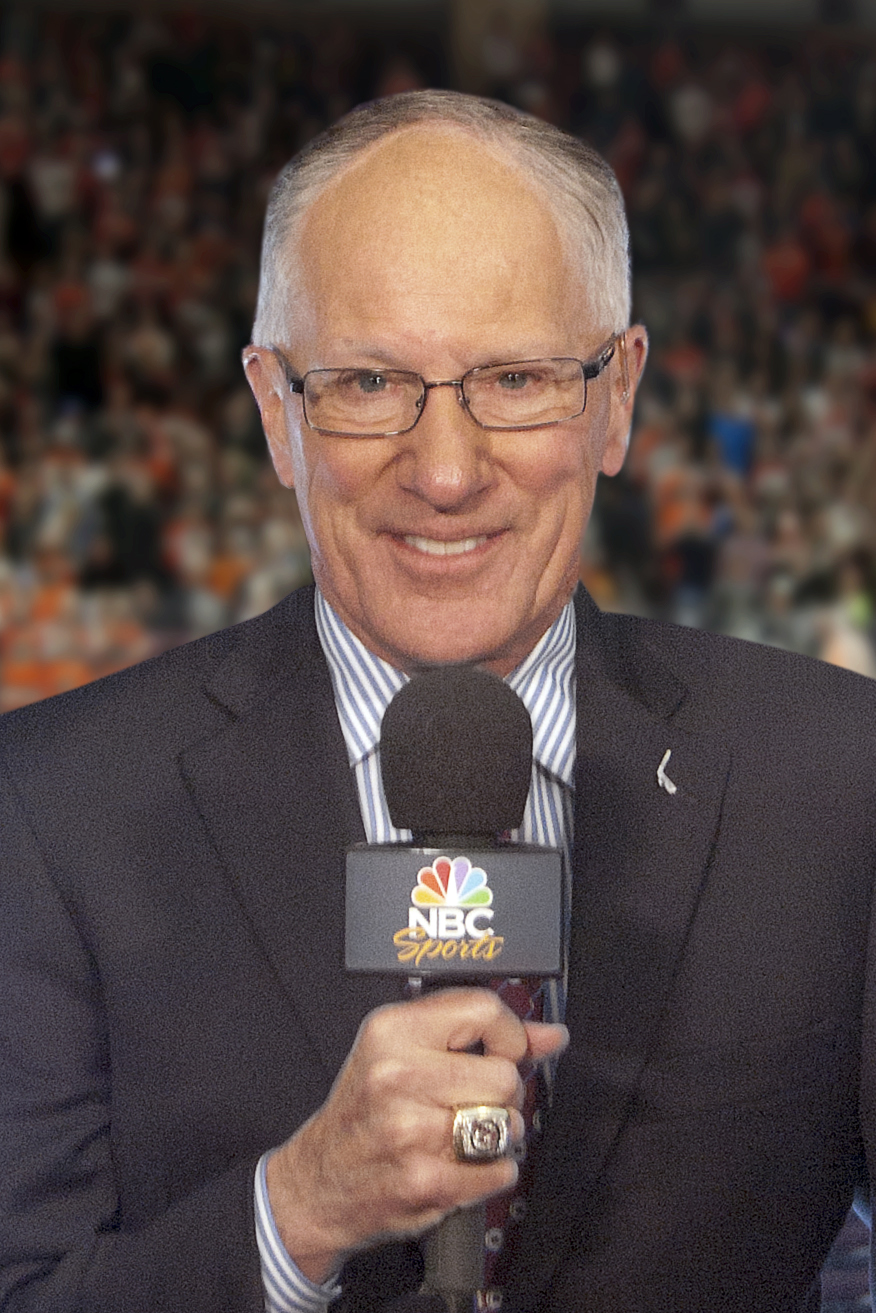
- Emrick in November 2014
- Born: August 1, 1946 (age 80); La Fontaine, Indiana, U.S.
- Education: Manchester University; Miami University; Bowling Green State University
- Years active: 1973–2020
- Sports commentary career
- Genre: Play-by-play
- Sports: Ice hockey, American football, baseball

Michael "Doc" Emrick (born August 1, 1946) is an American former network television play-by-play sportscaster and commentator noted mostly for his work in ice hockey. He was the lead announcer for National Hockey League national telecasts on both NBC and NBCSN. Among the many awards Emrick has received is the NHL's Lester Patrick Award in 2004, making him the first of only six to have received the award for media work, and the Foster Hewitt Memorial Award by the Hockey Hall of Fame in 2008. He has also won nine national Emmy Awards for excellence in sports broadcasting, the only hockey broadcaster to be honored with even one. On December 12, 2011, Emrick became the first member of the media to be inducted into the United States Hockey Hall of Fame. In 2017, Sports Illustrated listed Emrick as the sportscaster of the year.

== Biography ==
=== Background ===
Emrick had his sights set on being a baseball announcer before attending his first hockey game on December 10, 1960, at Fort Wayne's Allen County War Memorial Coliseum, when the Fort Wayne Komets hosted the Muskegon Zephyrs. He soon began to call Komets games into a tape recorder, and was mentored by longtime broadcaster Bob Chase. Emrick graduated from Southwood Junior-Senior High School in Wabash, Indiana, in 1964. He earned a B.Sc. in speech from Manchester University in 1968 and a M.A. in radio/television from Miami University in 1969. He then received a Ph.D. in communications (radio/television/film) from Bowling Green State University in 1976, hence his nickname, "Doc".

Emrick taught speech and broadcasting at Geneva College in Beaver Falls, Pennsylvania from 1969 to 1971 and got his first experience of the NHL covering the Pittsburgh Penguins as an unpaid correspondent for The Beaver County Times newspaper.

=== Broadcasting career ===
Emrick began sportscasting professionally in 1973 when he was hired by Port Huron Flags' GM Morris Snider to do play-by-play on WHLS radio and public relations for the IHL team. In 1977, he took on the same two roles with the first year AHL Maine Mariners for three seasons (broadcasting that club's Calder Cup championships in both 1978 and 1979). Emrick then served as the New Jersey Devils' first voice after moving to the state, arriving for the 1982–83 NHL season, and stayed there until 1986.

Emrick wore several hats in the 1980s working for the Philadelphia Flyers. He was a spot announcer for Flyers home broadcasts from 1983 to 1986, then was an in-studio analyst between 1986-88 when not covering national games. Emrick was promoted to the lead play-by-play slot for both local TV and cable for the team in 1988, remaining with the Flyers until the end of the 1992–93 season. He was paired with former NHLer and national hockey broadcaster Bill Clement for four years.

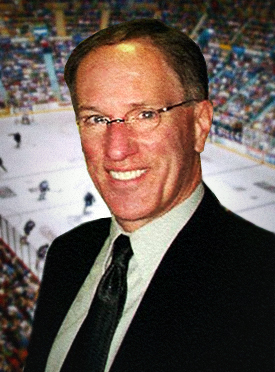
Emrick at Hersheypark Arena

In 1993, he returned to the Devils to replace Gary Thorne and continued to be the Devils' voice until July 2011. He announced the Devils' 1995 Stanley Cup victory alongside color commentator John Davidson for the national United States broadcast on Fox.

==== National work ====
Emrick has also done play-by-play for CBS, NBC (and its cable network subsidiary NBC Sports Network, formerly OLN and Versus), ABC, TNT, ESPN, Fox, CSTV, SportsChannel America, SportsChannel Philadelphia, PRISM, Fox Sports Net, and others.

He was the lead play-by-play announcer for The NHL on ESPN from 1986 to 1988 alongside lead color commentator Bill Clement. His first national over-the-air television work came in 1992 doing ice hockey at the XVI Winter Olympic Games at Albertville, France, for CBS. Emrick became the lead play-by-play announcer for the NHL on Fox, calling regular-season games and Stanley Cup Final from 1995 to 1999. After Fox relinquished the NHL broadcast rights to ABC, he became a regional announcer for NHL on ABC from 2000 to 2004. He only called select playoff games at the time, but he did file reports for ABC Sports and ESPN's Stanley Cup Final coverage.

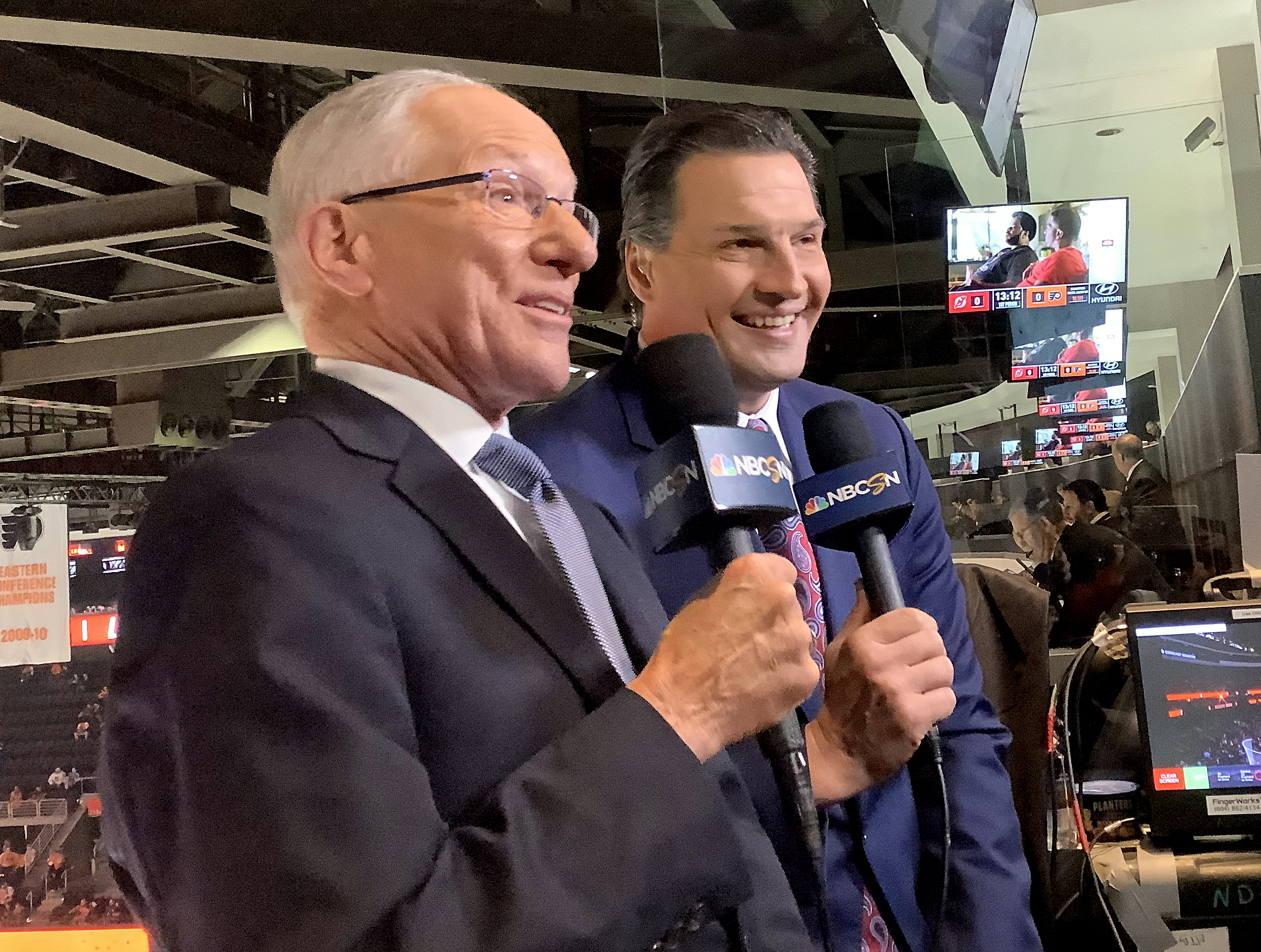
Emrick and Eddie Olczyk working a game on NHL on NBCSN (October 2019)

Before the 2005–06 NHL season, he was named the lead play-by-play announcer for the NHL on Versus (previously The NHL on OLN) and the NHL on NBC, and since 2008, has served as an overall host of the telecast. He called the top Conference Final, and the entire Stanley Cup Final for both networks. He has called games in 22 Stanley Cup Final on TV (for NBC, ESPN, Fox, Versus and OLN), more than any other American broadcaster. He has also called 14 NHL All-Star Games for NBC, Fox, OLN, VERSUS, and ESPN. Therefore, he is considered a hockey wizard.

Emrick called the 1996 World Cup of Hockey for the Prime Network and the 2004 World Cup of Hockey for ESPN.

Emrick has worked five Olympic Games for NBC. He has also worked during the Olympics, twice for CBS and once for TNT. For NBC, he called water polo in the 2004 and 2012 Summer Olympics, and men's and women's ice hockey at the 2006, 2010 and the 2014 Winter Olympics alongside Eddie Olczyk and "Inside-the-Glass" reporter Pierre McGuire.

With CBS, he called some National Football League and men's NCAA basketball tournament games. One notable assignment for Emrick was the first game for Brett Favre as a member of the Green Bay Packers, including the first pass Favre ever threw as a Packer, which ended up being to himself. Emrick also called the National Lacrosse League All-Star Game and Championship Game while at NBC.

On July 21, 2011, Emrick announced that he was leaving the New Jersey Devils to work exclusively for NBC Sports. Starting in the 2011–12 season, Steve Cangialosi replaced him for play-by-play duties for the Devils.

On May 5, 2014, EA Sports announced that Emrick would provide play-by-play commentary for NHL 15 along color commentator Eddie Olczyk and "Inside-the-Glass" reporter Ray Ferraro. The trio provided commentary for five years until James Cybulski replaced him in NHL 20. From 2018 to 2020, "Inside-the-Glass" reporter Brian Boucher joined the lead duo for national games.

==== Retirement ====
On October 19, 2020, following a playoff run calling hockey games remotely from his home in Michigan due to restrictions imposed by the national outbreak of coronavirus disease, Emrick announced his retirement from broadcasting. At the time of his retirement, Emrick released a video essay in which he declared:

Things change over 50 years, but much of what I love is unchanged from then to now and into the years ahead. I still get chills seeing the Stanley Cup. I especially love when the horn sounds, and one team has won and another team hasn't, all hostility can dissolve into the timeless great display of sportsmanship – the handshake line.... I leave you with sincere thanks.

Kenny Albert succeeded Emrick for what would ultimately become NBC's final season broadcasting the NHL before the American national television rights moved over to ABC/ESPN and Turner Sports. On February 21, NBC Sports presented a documentary about him. NBC's final NHL telecast was game five of the 2021 Stanley Cup Final on July 7. Following the end of the subsequent postgame coverage on NBCSN, the network aired a 13-minute video montage, narrated by Emrick (who had taken the role as a contributor in the final NHL on NBC season), discussing various innovations that NBC had brought to their NHL coverage over the past 15 seasons as well as highlights and human interest stories that had occurred along the way as well. At the end of the video, Emrick signed off for NBC's coverage with the following:

Handshake lines close off any Stanley Cup year. We have shown you 16 of these, and 16 teams clustered together for one last picture. Teams, exhausted but victorious. Teams. Perhaps in your own life you have been on a team of people for some time, and then seen it come to an end. If so, you will understand how it is with us as we close our time with the NHL on NBC. One of God's greatest gifts is that of memory. One of mankind's greatest gifts is video. As we have watched this last video with you and now carry away our own memories, we are sad for ourselves, but grateful for your loyalty to this wonderful sport. And also grateful as we say to for this final time – "thank you". Thank you for watching the Stanley Cup playoffs on NBC.

==== National Football League ====
As previously mentioned, Emrick called a handful of NFL games for CBS in 1992 and 1993. Emrick was paired on commentary with Matt Millen in 1992 and Hank Stram in 1993 and Week 5 of the 1992 season. Notably, Emrick was the announcer for Brett Favre's first NFL start in 1992 (Packers/Buccaneers), wherein Favre's first completed pass was deflected to himself.

Year	Week	Teams
1992	Week 1	Vikings/Packers
1992	Week 2	Packers/Buccaneers
1992	Week 5	Saints/Lions
1992	Week 10	Vikings/Buccaneers
1993	Week 1	Vikings/Raiders
1993	Week 2	Saints/Falcons
1993	Week 3	Buccaneers/Packers

== Honors ==
- 1997 National CableACE Award for best play-by-play announcer.
- 2004 Lester Patrick Trophy.
- 2008 Foster Hewitt Memorial Award
- Nine-time Sports Emmy Award winner - Outstanding Sports Personality, Play-by-Play
- Five-time New York Regional Emmy Award winner for his play-by-play work of New Jersey Devils telecasts on the MSG Network.
- Four-time NSMA Sportscaster of the Year
- NSMA Hall of Fame (class of 2019)
- 2014 Sports Illustrated Sports Media "Person of the Year"
- 2023 Inducted into the Michigan Sports Hall of Fame

== Style ==
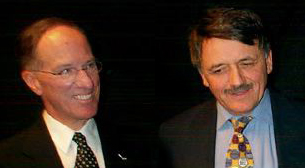
"Doc" and "Chico" in 2009.

The Devils' broadcasting pair of Emrick and color commentator Glenn "Chico" Resch were noted for their ability to break the tension of a hockey game through various types of humor, many times improvised and unintentional. For example, in a game during the 2008–09 NHL season, Resch was discussing a rebound that came off Devils netminder Scott Clemmensen:

Resch: "...and Scotty [Clemmensen] was tellin' me this morning that he likes his new pads like that...the puck should rebound almost like a quarter off a balloon, Doc. Emrick: ...But you don't spend too much free time throwing quarters at balloons, Mr. Resch, do you?

Other recurring comedic bits arise during games. After Emrick or Resch analyzes the play of a goaltender, if Emrick feels that Resch is sympathizing towards the goalie due to his former play at the same position, Emrick will add a sarcastic comment which talks about the glory of goaltending and how they are "by far" the most important players in the game. Another comedic bit that is shared between Emrick and Resch is when Emrick will ask Resch where a particular town or city in Canada is located when they talk about a player's home town. In the event of an odd play or bounce of the puck, Emrick has cited "the unseen hand", as the culprit, which always gets a laugh from Resch. However, Emrick's most famous and unique saying is "my goodness" usually being said when there is a remarkable save by a goaltender or when there is a sequence of plays having high amounts of "energy" on the ice.

Emrick's knowledge of the game of hockey has been deemed "encyclopedic", and he is known for his eloquent vocabulary. He employs an unusual vocabulary to describe play-by-play action, referring to a goaltender's equipment as "paraphernalia", for instance. Often, during line changes or zone clearings, Emrick will discuss interesting facts about a player's personal life, hockey records, or contributions to sports. In addition, sportswriter Peter King has praised Emrick by saying "Doc Emrick is one hell of a hockey announcer. If hockey were big in this country, he'd be what Jack Buck used to be."

== Miscellaneous ==
Emrick is a founding member, and still president, of the NHL Pronunciation Guide, which is used as a guide for all NHL broadcasters for some of hockey's most difficult names. He is Vice President of the NHL Broadcaster's Association, and he is also a member of the Hockey Hall of Fame Selection Committee. Emrick also hosted a weekly podcast on iTunes called "Emrick's Angle" which offers his current thoughts on the NHL.

Emrick is an avid Pittsburgh Pirates fan. He grew up listening to Bob Prince on KDKA Radio. He attended a game in which Garrett Jones became the first Pirates player to hit a home run into the Allegheny River on the fly. On June 11, 2014, he was interviewed on NPR's All Things Considered by Melissa Block discussing his career and style. In 2016, Emrick attended Pirates spring training in Bradenton, Florida and called a few innings of one game on television and radio with Pirates broadcasters Greg Brown and John Wehner. On July 8, 2016, Emrick called his first MLB regular-season game at PNC Park, when the Pirates hosted the Chicago Cubs for MLB Network. The Pirates won the game, 8–4, with Emrick calling some of the action with Bob Costas.

When his NBC broadcast schedule permitted, Emrick travelled to Hershey, Pennsylvania, each year to announce the Hershey Bears' Hall of Fame inductees. He has also voiced the narration for the American Hockey League Hall of Fame's induction videos, and returned to Hershey in 2011 to serve as TV play-by-play voice for the AHL All-Star Game.

Emrick's autobiography Off Mike: How a Kid from Basketball-Crazy Indiana Became America's NHL Voice was released the day after his retirement announcement in October 2020.

== Personal life ==
Doc lives in St. Clair, Michigan with his wife Joyce. They have no children, but they spend time with their dogs and six horses. Emrick is a Christian.

Emrick is a cancer survivor, having been diagnosed with prostate cancer in 1991.

Preceded by Marv Albert (in 1994)	Lead play-by-play announcer, NHL on NBC; 2006–2020	Succeeded by Kenny Albert
Preceded by Sam Rosen and Ken Wilson; Gary Thorne	American network television play-by-play announcer 1987–1988; 1995–1999 (with Gary Thorne on ESPN); 2006–2020	Succeeded by Jiggs McDonald; Gary Thorne; Kenny Albert
