= John Wells (sportscaster) =

Canadian sportscaster (born 1946)

John Wells (born February 11, 1946) is a Canadian sportscaster. His most recent show, which ended in April 2008, was Wells And Company on CJOB radio in Winnipeg, Manitoba, Canada. He broadcast Canadian Football League (CFL) games for over 30 years. He is the son of "Cactus" Jack Wells. He was inducted into the Canadian Football Hall of Fame in 1995.

== Biography ==
=== Early life and career ===
Wells broadcasting career began in 1965 at Winnipeg's CKY-FM. He moved to television in 1969 as sports director for CKCK-TV in Regina. Wells spent six years as a play-by-play announcer for CFL on CTV. He also spent nine years with CBXT in Edmonton.

=== CBC Sports ===
In 1971, Wells began working for CBC Sports. At CBC, he worked at two Canada Games (1971 & 1979) and hosted the 1978 Commonwealth Games, the 1983 World University Games, and the 1984 Summer and Winter Olympics. He also worked on Hockey Night in Canada from 1979 to 1984 as a rinkside reporter and host for telecasts from Edmonton and as a studio host and play-by-play announcer on the CFL on CBC from 1973 to 1983.

=== TSN ===
In 1984, Wells joined the new cable specialty channel, The Sports Network. At TSN, he hosted the 1988 Winter Olympics and was the first host of the NHL on TSN, and the first play by play man of the CFL on TSN. He was also one of the original SportsDesk hosts and also hosted TSN Sunday and SportsDesk X-tra. He also covered Canada Cup hockey, Canadian college football, Blue Jays baseball, boxing, horse racing, and other variety of sports. From 1990 to 1993, he hosted coverage of the NHL entry draft. When the NBA came to Canada in 1995, Wells became the host of TSN's pre-game show, NBA Tonight. Wells also contributed on TSN's coverage of curling, including calling the early rounds of the 2001 Nokia Brier and the 2003 Scott Tournament of Hearts. For years, he hosted the CFL Outstanding Player Awards and the annual Hockey Hall of Fame induction ceremony. He was also a frequent guest and co-host on the Fan 590, and panelist on Prime Time Sports.

=== Departure from TSN and move to CJOB radio ===
By 2006, Wells had been phased out at TSN after Chris Cuthbert joined the network. He moved to CJOB radio in Winnipeg, where he became the host of an afternoon show. Wells left CJOB in April 2008.
