= NHL All-Star Hockey '95 =

1995 video game

- Developers: Sega Midwest Studio; New Wave Graphics
- Publisher: Sega
- Producers: Richard Robbins; Howard Schwartz
- Designers: Michael Mendheim; Alan H. Martin
- Programmer: John Walsh
- Platform: Sega Genesis
- Release: NA: February 1995
- Genre: Sports (ice hockey)
- Modes: Single-player, multiplayer

NHL All-Star Hockey '95 is a sports video game developed by Sega Midwest Studio and published by Sega for the Genesis in February 1995. Separate versions, both titled NHL All-Star Hockey, were released for the Game Gear and Sega Saturn also in 1995. Versions for the 32X and Sega CD were reported but never released.

== Gameplay ==
NHL All-Star Hockey '95 is a hockey game which features the license and stats for each hockey player.

== Development and release ==
NHL All-Star Hockey '95 was developed by Sega Midwest Studio, a division of Sega that was founded in October 1992 in Northbrook, Illinois to focus on producing games for the Genesis console and its 32X add-on. The division's first prototype, a 32X shooter called Black Angel, was shelved in favor of an internally-developed hockey title, as sports games were solid sellers at the time. Appointed to head the Midwest division was Joseph Robbins, who was a previous executive of Empire Distribution, Sunsoft America, and Atari, Inc., as well as a former varsity hockey player, referee, and coach. Some of the graphical assets from Black Angel were diverted to the hockey project while New Wave Graphics provided the design and art direction. Commentator Marv Albert lent his voice for the audio. Over one thousand frames of rotoscoped animation were used. Sega was unable to retain the Mario Lemieux license that it had for Mario Lemieux Hockey, so a National Hockey League license was used instead. Work on NHL All-Star Hockey '95 was completed at the end of 1994.

The game was released on the Genesis in North America in February 1995. A television advertisement for the game featured Tie Domi of the Winnipeg Jets viciously tossing a male figure skater onto an ice rink. Domi described, "I know it doesn't make sense, but there's this figure skater and I beat the crap out of him." The commercial was criticized by Toronto Star writer Antonia Zerbisias for promoting "violence against stereotypical gay male images." Sega stated in an apology that the company never meant to offend and that the original concept for the ad was to have infamous skater Tonya Harding instead of Domi, but that the NHL "nixed the idea."

== Reception ==
Reception

Review scores
Publication	Score
Electronic Gaming Monthly	11/20
Game Informer	5.5/10
Game Players	75%
GameFan	80/100
GamePro	3.125/5
Next Generation	3/5
MAN!AC	63%
TodoSega	82%
Video Games (DE)	67%

Next Generation reviewed the game, rating it three stars out of five, and stated that "The slow pace and wonky control keep Sega's All-Star NHL '95 in the middle of the hockey pack with a host of other wannabe's, and until next year, EA's NHL '95 still holds the cup."
