= John Bartlett (sportscaster) =

Canadian sportscaster

John Bartlett is a Canadian sportscaster who currently works as a hockey play-by-play announcer on Rogers Sportsnet and Hockey Night in Canada.

== Early life ==
Bartlett was born in Kingston, Ontario and raised in the Toronto area. His father worked for Bell and his mother worked for CKDX-FM. Both of his parents were from Montreal and moved to Ontario shortly before Bartlett was born. One of his grandfathers was a Montreal Canadiens season ticket holder for five decades and Bartlett grew up a Canadiens fan. Bartlett graduated from Sacred Heart Catholic High School in Newmarket, Ontario.

== Broadcasting ==
In 1995, Bartlett, then a goalie in Junior A hockey, volunteered to handle public address announcements at tournament games in Newmarket. He gained his first play-by-play experience when the announcer for Rogers TV failed to show up for a game between the York-Simcoe Express and the Barrie Flyers. He entered the broadcast journalism program at Centennial College in Toronto and spent his early years as a play-by-play and public address announcer for junior games in Newmarket, Bradford, Ontario, and Aurora, Ontario. At the age of 22 he became the play-by-play announcer for the Barrie Colts. From 2005 to 2011, Bartlett was the play-by-play announcer for the Toronto Marlies. In 2007 he won the American Hockey League's James H. Ellery Memorial Awards for outstanding radio coverage.

In 2011, Bartlett became the English radio voice of the Montreal Canadiens. In 2014, Sportsnet hired Bartlett to call Canadiens games on its regional network. In 2017, Bartlett moved to TSN when the Canadiens regional broadcasts moved to that network. The following year, Bartlett returned to Sportsnet when he succeeded Paul Romanuk as the regional TV voice of the Toronto Maple Leafs as well as an announcer for select national games for Hockey Night in Canada. Garry Galley was his color commentator for those games.

As of the 2020-2021 season, Bartlett is no longer the Leafs regional TV voice, but regularly works nationally televised games for Sportsnet, often involving the Montreal Canadiens and Ottawa Senators.
