= Glenn Healy =

Canadian ice hockey player (born 1962)

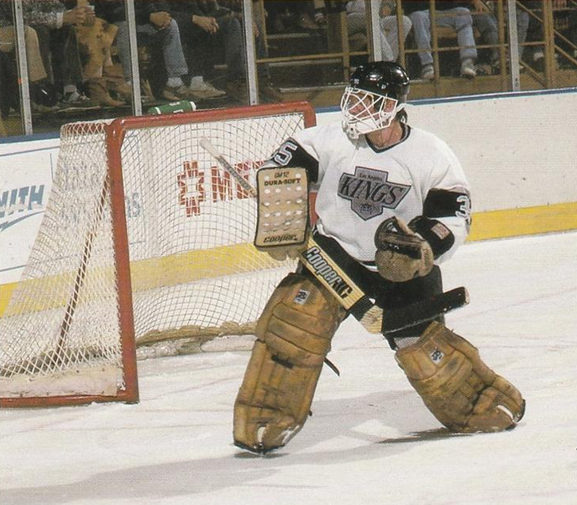
- Healy in 1988 postcard
- Born: August 23, 1962 (age 64) Pickering, Ontario, Canada
- Height: 5 ft 7 in (170 cm)
- Weight: 183 lb (83 kg; 13 st 1 lb)
- Position: Goaltender
- Caught: Left
- Played for: Los Angeles Kings; New York Islanders; New York Rangers; Toronto Maple Leafs
- NHL draft: Undrafted
- Playing career: 1985–2001

Glenn Healy (born August 23, 1962) is a Canadian former professional ice hockey goaltender who played for 15 years in the National Hockey League (NHL). Prior to that, he was a member of the Western Michigan University ice hockey team, and 1985 graduate of the school. He also served as the director of player affairs for the National Hockey League Players' Association (NHLPA). He resigned on September 3, 2009, in the wake of the firing of NHLPA executive director Paul Kelly. In his capacity as director of player affairs, Healy also served as a non-voting member on the NHL Competition Committee, overseeing the NHLPA's interests regarding rule and equipment issues and player safety matters. He serves as the executive director/president of the NHL Alumni Association.

== Biography ==
=== Playing career ===
During his career, Healy played for the Los Angeles Kings, New York Islanders, New York Rangers and the Toronto Maple Leafs. During the 1992–93 season, he helped lead an up-start New York Islander team to the Wales Conference Finals, shocking the two-time defending Stanley Cup Champion Pittsburgh Penguins along the way. In the 1993 off-season, the Islanders lost Healy to the Mighty Ducks of Anaheim in the expansion draft. The next day, he was claimed by the Tampa Bay Lightning in phase two of the draft. The very same day Healy was traded to the New York Rangers for a third round pick. Healy was a part of the Rangers' Stanley Cup winning team in 1993-94, and he played 68 playoff minutes that year. During the 1995–96 season, Healy won both the Rangers Good Guy Award and the Rangers Fan Club Ceil Saidel Award. At the time he won these awards, he was the Rangers' number-one goalie while Mike Richter was injured. Healy appeared on three video game covers during his career, his first being Electronic Arts' NHL Hockey in 1991, then in Jaleco's Pro Sport Hockey and later Sega's NHL All-Star Hockey '95, both for the Sega Genesis (Healy also appeared on the cover of the Game Gear release of NHL All-Star Hockey). Healy and Wayne Gretzky are the only two players to appear on at least three different video game franchise's covers (Healy is playing for a different team in all three covers).

=== Broadcasting career ===
After his long playing career he served as hockey colour commentator and studio analyst, first for the CBC and then for TSN. He also served as the secondary colour commentator for TSN Hockey and as an ice-level reporter for TSN's regional Toronto Maple Leafs telecasts. At the start of the 2009–10 NHL season, he moved back to analyzing games for CBC's Hockey Night in Canada before he joined the NHL on Sportsnet crew in 2014.

Healy created the "Loch Ness Monster" hockey analysis segment for TSN, in which he picked a player (or players) who was supposed to be a key player that night but did not turn out to be (the tagline being that the player is "the monster you hear about but don't see"). Bagpipes can be heard in the background and the chosen player is dubbed "tonight's Nessie". One notable occurrence was the March 29, 2008, broadcast of the Boston Bruins' 4-0 win over the Ottawa Senators, where Healy selected the entire Senators team that night as the "Nessie". The segment's title is a parody of fellow analyst Pierre McGuire's "Monster" segment, which focuses on a player's whose contributions have been particularly effective.

Healy was also a colour analyst for the 2007 Casino Rama Curling Skins Game finals on TSN.

In June 2016, Rogers Media announced that Healy would be among the eight cut from Hockey Night in Canada.

== Career statistics ==
=== Regular season and playoffs ===
			Regular season									Playoffs
Season	Team	League	GP	W	L	T	MIN	GA	SO	GAA	SV%	GP	W	L	MIN	GA	SO	GAA	SV%
1979–80	Pickering Panthers	MetJHL	31	—	—	—	1850	123	0	3.99	—	—	—	—	—	—	—	—	—
1980–81	Pickering Panthers	MetJHL	35	—	—	—	2080	120	1	3.46	—	—	—	—	—	—	—	—	—
1981–82	Western Michigan University	CCHA	27	7	19	1	1569	116	0	4.44	—	—	—	—	—	—	—	—	—
1982–83	Western Michigan University	CCHA	30	8	19	2	1732	116	0	4.02	—	—	—	—	—	—	—	—	—
1983–84	Western Michigan University	CCHA	38	19	16	3	2241	146	0	3.91	—	—	—	—	—	—	—	—	—
1984–85	Western Michigan University	CCHA	37	21	14	2	2171	118	0	3.26	.906	—	—	—	—	—	—	—	—
1985–86	Los Angeles Kings	NHL	1	0	0	0	51	6	0	7.06	.829	—	—	—	—	—	—	—	—
1985–86	Toledo Goaldiggers	IHL	7	—	—	—	402	28	0	4.18	—	—	—	—	—	—	—	—	—
1985–86	New Haven Nighthawks	AHL	43	21	15	4	2410	160	0	3.98	—	2	0	2	49	11	0	5.55	—
1986–87	New Haven Nighthawks	AHL	47	21	15	0	2828	173	1	3.67	—	7	3	4	427	19	0	2.67	—
1987–88	Los Angeles Kings	NHL	34	12	18	1	1865	135	1	4.34	.865	4	1	3	238	20	0	5.04	.843
1988–89	Los Angeles Kings	NHL	48	25	19	2	2699	192	0	4.27	.872	3	0	1	97	6	0	3.72	.898
1989–90	New York Islanders	NHL	39	12	19	6	2197	128	2	3.49	.894	4	1	2	166	9	0	3.25	.886
1990–91	New York Islanders	NHL	53	18	24	9	2999	166	0	3.32	.893	—	—	—	—	—	—	—	—
1991–92	New York Islanders	NHL	37	14	16	4	1960	124	1	3.80	.881	—	—	—	—	—	—	—	—
1992–93	New York Islanders	NHL	47	22	20	2	2655	146	1	3.30	.889	18	9	8	1109	59	0	3.19	.887
1993–94	New York Rangers	NHL	29	10	12	2	1368	69	2	3.03	.878	2	0	0	68	1	0	0.89	.941
1994–95	New York Rangers	NHL	17	8	6	1	888	35	1	2.36	.907	5	2	1	230	13	0	3.39	.860
1995–96	New York Rangers	NHL	44	17	14	11	2654	124	2	2.90	.900	—	—	—	—	—	—	—	—
1996–97	New York Rangers	NHL	23	5	12	4	1357	59	1	2.61	.907	—	—	—	—	—	—	—	—
1997–98	Toronto Maple Leafs	NHL	21	4	10	2	1068	53	0	2.98	.883	—	—	—	—	—	—	—	—
1998–99	Toronto Maple Leafs	NHL	9	6	3	0	546	27	0	2.97	.895	1	0	0	20	0	0	0.00	1.000
1998–99	Chicago Wolves	IHL	10	6	3	1	597	33	0	3.32	.889	—	—	—	—	—	—	—	—
1999–2000	Toronto Maple Leafs	NHL	20	9	10	0	1164	59	2	3.04	.888	—	—	—	—	—	—	—	—
2000–01	Toronto Maple Leafs	NHL	15	4	7	3	871	38	0	2.62	.885	—	—	—	—	—	—	—	—
NHL totals			437	166	190	47	24,254	1361	13	3.37	.887	37	13	15	1928	108	0	3.36	.881

== Awards and honours ==
Award	Year
All-CCHA Second Team	1984–85
AHCA West Second-Team All-American	1984–85
Stanley Cup (with New York Rangers)	1994

Awards and achievements
Preceded by Mike David	CCHA Most Valuable Player in Tournament; 1984	Succeeded by Norm Foster
