= Gord Miller (sportscaster) =

Canadian sports broadcaster

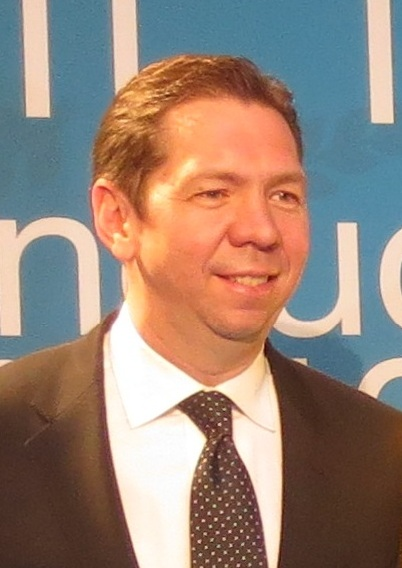
- Miller at the 2013 IIHF Hall of Fame induction ceremony
- Born: June 21, 1965 (age 61); Edmonton, Alberta, Canada
- Awards: Paul Loicq Award (2013)
- Sports commentary career
- Team: Canadian men's national junior team (2002–present)
- Genres: play-by-play, reporter, host
- Sports: Ice hockey, Canadian football, Track and field
- Employer: Bell Media

Gord Miller (born June 21, 1965) is a Canadian sportscaster for Bell Media's sports cable network TSN. He is the lead play-by-play announcer for TSN Hockey and coverage of international hockey, including the IIHF World Junior Championship. He also covered the annual NHL entry draft, provided play-by-play for Canadian Football League games, and does play-by-play for the Stanley Cup playoffs on ESPN in the United States. Miller was awarded the Paul Loicq Award by the International Ice Hockey Federation in 2013, for his contributions to international ice hockey.

== Early life ==
Miller was born June 21, 1965, in Edmonton, Alberta. As a student at McKernan Junior High School, Miller fought in City Hall against a proposed curfew for children under 16. He collected over 3,000 names to petition the curfew and won. After graduating from McKernan Junior High School, Miller attended Strathcona High School alongside Guy Gadowsky.

After graduating from high school, Miller accepted a position as a radio reporter at an Edmonton Oilers home game where he had the opportunity to interview Wayne Gretzky.

== Career ==
Miller began working for the Canadian Broadcasting Corporation (CBC) in 1984, where he covered the Edmonton Oilers. He joined TSN as a reporter in 1990 and occasionally calling NHL hockey when needed. In 1994, he began doing hockey play-by-play regularly as the lead announcer on the network's Canadian Hockey League coverage, including the Memorial Cup, as well as more frequent NHL assignments. That year also began his run as a part of TSN's annual World Junior Ice Hockey Championships coverage, first as a rinkside reporter and secondary play-by-play caller, eventually becoming the lead announcer in 2002. He also covered the IIHF World Championships and Women's World Championships.

From 1998 to 2001, he was host of That's Hockey and then returned to the broadcast booth in 2001 as the English television play-by-play voice of the Montreal Canadiens on TSN's regional feed for one season.

In 2002, Miller became TSN's lead hockey play-by-play announcer when it reacquired national broadcast rights to the NHL, teaming up with lead color commentator Pierre McGuire on the lead broadcast team. In 2010, Miller and TSN colleague Chris Cuthbert were selected by Canada's Olympic Broadcast Media Consortium as play-by-play announcers for the men's ice hockey tournament at the Winter Olympics in Vancouver. Since TSN lost the national contract in 2014 to rival Sportsnet and its parent Rogers Media, he now serves as the lead play-by-play for Toronto Maple Leafs and Ottawa Senators regional games on TSN and international hockey coverage.

Miller called the track and field events at the 2012 Summer Olympics in London for Canada's Olympic Broadcast Media Consortium, including the 100m final featuring Usain Bolt.

In 2022, Miller joined the announcers of NHL on ESPN for the Stanley Cup playoffs.

== Honours and awards ==
Miller was nominated for a Gemini Award in 2008 in the Best Sports Play-by-Play Announcer category for the 2008 IIHF World Junior Championship gold medal game.

In 2013, Miller was awarded the Paul Loicq Award by the International Ice Hockey Federation for his contributions to international ice hockey. The award was presented on May 19 in Stockholm, with Miller introduced by Bob Nicholson.
