= Bryan Mudryk =

Canadian sportscaster for TSN (born 1979)

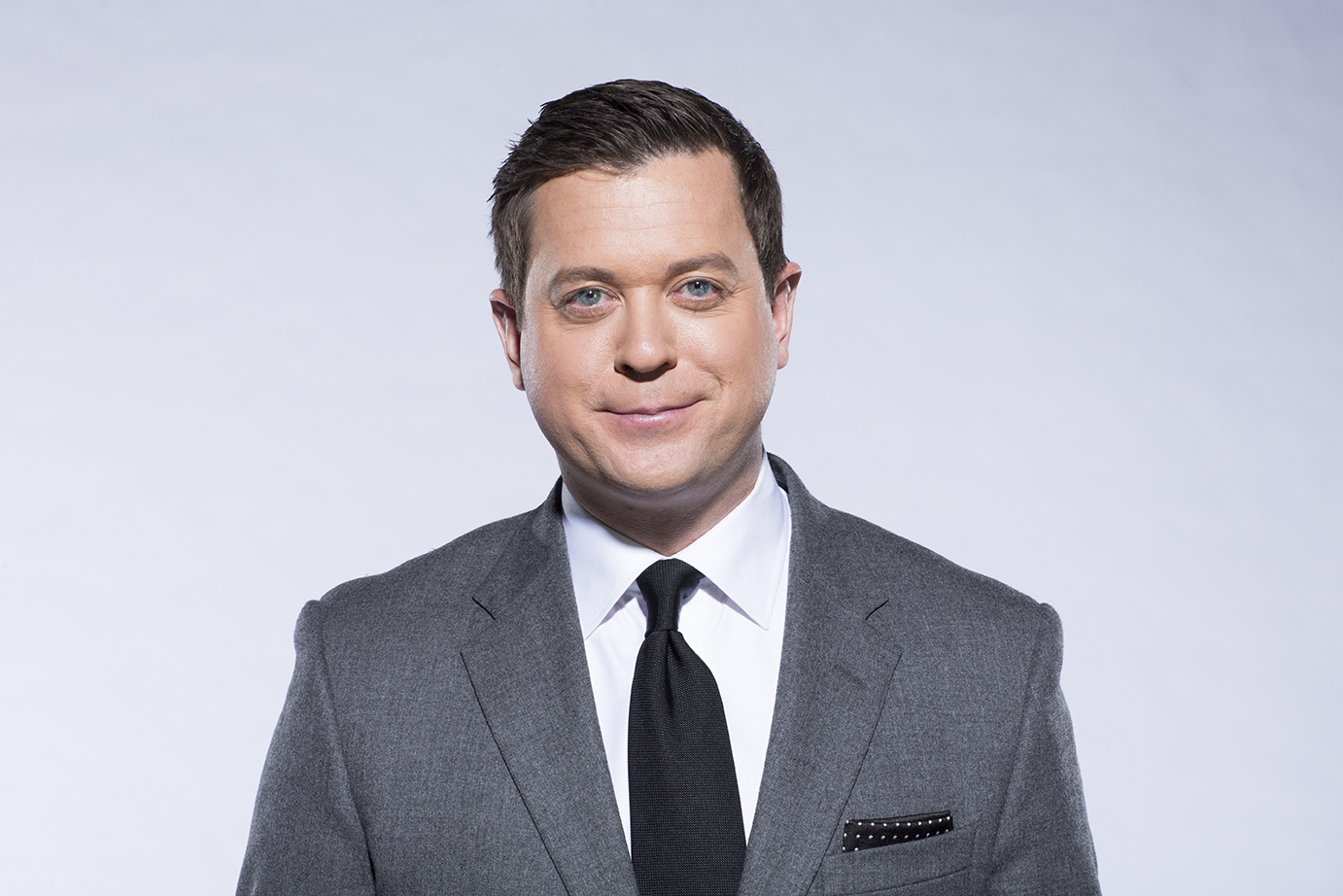
- Born: July 13, 1979 (age 47); Athabasca, Alberta
- Occupation: Canadian sportscaster
- Known for: TSN and SportsCentre

Bryan Mudryk (/ˈmuːdrɪk/ MOO-drik; born July 13, 1979) is a Canadian sportscaster for TSN. He was a frequent host of SportsCentre and is now a play-by-play announcer for the Montreal Canadiens. He is also a part of TSN's curling broadcast team. He has been with TSN since October 2005.

== Career ==
Prior to joining TSN, Mudryk was a sports anchor and reporter at CTV Edmonton between 2001 and 2005. From 1999 to 2001, he reported on sports for A-Channel Winnipeg.

In 2009, Mudryk replaced Rod Black as TSN's secondary curling announcer. Mudryk is a regular in the broadcast booth for TSN's Season of Champions curling, covering the Scotties Tournament of Hearts and Tim Hortons Brier, as well as hosting the Pinty's All-Star Curling Skins Game and Continental Cup. Mudryk also called curling during the 2010 Olympic Winter Games in Vancouver, and delivered commentary for a number of events during the 2012 Olympic Summer Games in London, including equestrian, tae kwon do, and judo. He's also called the IIHF U18 Men's Hockey Worlds since 2015.

Prior to the start of the 2018/19 National Hockey League season, Mudryk was named play-by-play announcer for the network's Montreal Canadiens regional broadcasts. He also occasionally fills in on play-by-play Ottawa Senators regional games when Gord Miller is not available.

== Personal life ==
Mudryk is a cancer survivor, having fought Hodgkin's lymphoma at the age of nineteen. His tournament, the annual Bryan Mudryk Golf Classic, has raised over 1.8 million dollars for the Cross Cancer Institute in Edmonton. The foundation has also launched a special scholarship for post-secondary students undergoing treatment for cancer. For his efforts, Mudryk was a nominee for Canada's Top 40 Under 40 Award.

Mudryk competed in curling in his youth, and played in the 1999 Alberta Junior Curling Championships.
