= Gary Green (ice hockey) =

Canadian ice hockey coach (born 1953)

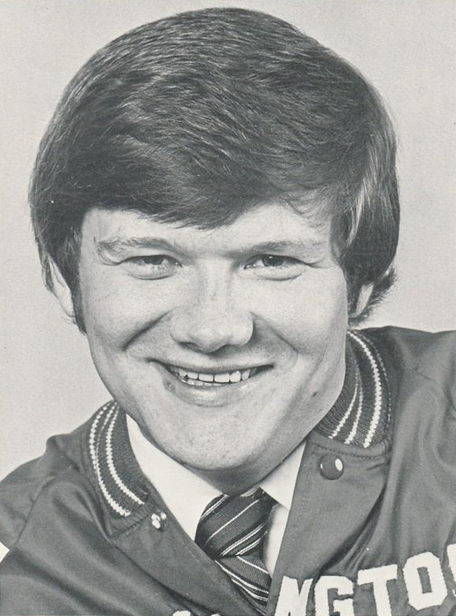
- Green as head coach of the Washington Capitals
- Born: August 23, 1953 (age 73) Tillsonburg, Ontario, Canada
- Coached for: Washington Capitals
- Coaching career: 1979–1982

Gary Green (born August 23, 1953, in Tillsonburg, Ontario) is a former NHL head coach and longtime hockey broadcaster. Before his time in the NHL, he served as head coach and general manager of the Peterborough Petes in the OHA from 1977 to 1979, earning OHA Coach of the Year honors for the 1978–79 season. He then took over as head coach of the AHL's Hershey Bears for the 1979–80 campaign. Later that same season, Green was hired to replace Danny Belisle as head coach of the Washington Capitals. At just 26 years old, he became the youngest head coach in NHL history.

After his dismissal from the Capitals in 1981, Green transitioned to broadcasting, becoming a color commentator for the USA Network's NHL coverage until 1985. In 1987, he joined TSN, where he worked until 2004, covering a wide range of hockey events, including college hockey, the Canada Cup, TSN Hockey, and various IIHF tournaments such as the World Junior Championships and World Championships. He also contributed to TSN's national hockey broadcasts alongside Jim Hughson and Paul Romanuk, and covered the NHL Entry Draft from 1990 to 1998. In 1995, he did some NHL broadcasts for Fox. In addition to his national duties, Green also served as a regional color commentator for the Winnipeg Jets from 1985 to 1996 and the Montreal Canadiens from 1998 to 2002.

He later took on the role of head coach for Team Canada at the prestigious Spengler Cup tournament held annually in Davos, Switzerland, guiding the national squad in one of the oldest invitational ice hockey tournaments in the world. In addition to his coaching duties, he transitioned into a successful broadcasting career, serving as a hockey analyst for both the NHL Network and NHL Radio.

== Coaching record ==
| Team | Year | Regular season | | | | | | Postseason |
| Team | Year | G | W | L | T | Pts | Finish | Result |
|---|---|---|---|---|---|---|---|---|
| Washington Capitals | 1979–80 | 64 | 23 | 30 | 11 | 57 | 5th in Patrick | Did not qualify |
| Washington Capitals | 1980–81 | 80 | 26 | 36 | 18 | 70 | 5th in Patrick | Did not qualify |
| Washington Capitals | 1981–82 | 13 | 1 | 12 | 0 | 2 | 5th in Patrick | Fired |
| NHL totals | | 157 | 50 | 78 | 29 | 129 | | |

Sporting positions
| Preceded by Danny Belisle | Head coach of the Washington Capitals; 1979–81 | Succeeded by Roger Crozier |
