= Paul Romanuk =

Canadian sportscaster and writer

- Born: October 31, 1961 (age 65); Oshawa, Ontario, Canada
- Occupation: Sportscaster
- Years active: 1983–present
- Known for: The NHL Tonight on TSN play-by-play announcer (1989–1998); Hockey Night in Canada play-by-play announcer (2014–2018)

Paul Romanuk (born October 31, 1961) is a Canadian sportscaster and writer. He has provided television play-by-play commentary for the Toronto Maple Leafs, the NHL on Sportsnet, and the NHL on TSN.

== Early life ==
Raised in Oshawa, Romanuk grew up a hockey fan, playing road hockey. Watching games called by Hockey Night in Canada play-by-play announcer Danny Gallivan, the youngster simultaneously developed an interest in sportscasting. Furthermore, he also followed Bill Hewitt's announcing work as well as Dan Kelly's on the St. Louis-based KMOX AM radio station.

Despite growing up 60 km (37 mi) from Toronto, in the 1970s, rather than embracing the Maple Leafs, young Romanuk became a fan of the Montreal Canadiens whom he took a liking to through his broadcasting hero Gallivan by watching CBC's Peterborough-based CHEX-TV channel 12 affiliate that usually carried HNIC`s national feed, often featuring Gallivan-called Canadiens games alongside colour commentator Dick Irvin Jr.. Stating to have been "as much in love with Gallivan as I was with the Habs", Romanuk considers the broadcaster to be as much a part of the 1970s Canadiens as their star players Guy Lafleur, Steve Shutt, Ken Dryden, Serge Savard, etc.

In 1981, Romanuk moved to Toronto to study at Ryerson Polytechnical Institute's radio and television arts program.

== Career ==
=== Early years ===
From 1981 until 1984, in parallel with studies at Ryerson, Romanuk volunteered on Toronto Marlboros Sunday broadcasts on CKLN-FM, Ryerson's campus radio station. He began as a statistics and technical assistant for play-by-play announcer Michael Landsberg before taking over the play-by-play duties following Landsberg's departure.

In 1983, Romanuk, still a Ryerson student, landed his first paid job in broadcasting, providing radio colour commentary for the Ontario Hockey League's Oshawa Generals on CKAR alongside play-by-play man Mike Inglis. By 1984, Inglis moved on and Romanuk took over the play-by-play duties; continuing in the role after graduating and performing it until 1987.

=== Early freelance work ===
Upon graduating from Ryerson in 1984, Romanuk added a few more freelance gigs.

First on Hockey Night in Canada as a statistics assistant and runner for the CBC Sports on-air hockey personnel—play-by-play announcer Bob Cole, colour commentator Harry Neale, and studio host Dave Hodge—a job he did until 1987. While working behind the scenes at HNIC, on March 14, 1987, Romanuk was among the first hand witnesses of Hodge's "pen flip", an incident that led to the prominent host's termination from the network.

Additionally, from February 1985, fresh graduate Romanuk freelanced for the new all-sports cable channel TSN, starting there as a newsroom editorial assistant. He soon got the opportunity to contribute field pieces and file on-camera reports, even doing the occasional update on TSN's central nightly sports newscast SportsDesk.

With his television profile raised via TSN on-camera appearances, Romanuk got hired to host the OHL Game of the Week presentation during the 1986–87 season on Global Television Network. This further television exposure led to Calgary's CFAC-TV station (at the time still nominally unaffiliated though increasingly reliant on Global's programming) offering him C$50,000, an amount Romanuk described as "more money than I had been making from all my freelance gigs put together", for a full-time reporter job that further included anchoring their Newsfirst news show. The 25-year-old accepted, bringing his girlfriend along across the country in 1987. Mere months after moving to Calgary, however, Romanuk received a full-time reporter position offer on TSN's SportsDesk back in Toronto and decided to take it to the displeasure of his Calgary employers.

=== TSN ===
In October 1987, Romanuk returned to TSN as a full-time commentator and reporter.

==== NHL and IIHF play-by-play ====
He did National Hockey League play-by-play for the TSN Hockey from 1989 until 2001. Before 1994, Romanuk was the secondary TSN hockey play-by-play voice behind Jim Hughson. Hughson left TSN and from the 1994–95 season to the 1997–98 season (when the network lost national NHL rights) Romanuk was the network's lead NHL play-by-play announcer. From 1998 to 2001 he was the English-language television voice of the Montreal Canadiens' regional broadcasts on TSN.

He was best known in Canada for his play-by-play work of international hockey on TSN, where he called virtually every major IIHF tournament from 1990 until he left the network in early 2001. He covered the NHL Entry Draft from 1987 to '93 and 1997 as a reporter, and from 1994 to '96 and 1998 as a co-host. He also co-hosted the program Baseball Tonight.

==== Other ====
In November 1992, while covering the Vanier Cup with TSN as a sideline reporter, he was literally picked up and carried around the field in good-natured celebration by Queen's fans after the game had ended, shortly after interviewing MVP Brad Elberg. He has not covered a Vanier Cup since then.

Romanuk has also shared a production credit on CHL Sunday Night on TSN and also on Rogers Sportsnet's presentation of the Spengler Cup hockey tournament. He has also worked at six Olympic Games (Sydney, Salt Lake City, Athens, Beijing, Vancouver and London), covering a variety of sports for CBC, TSN and CTV.

=== The Team 1050 ===
In spring 2001, enticed by a job offer that did not entail regular travel in addition to being financially superior to his TSN compensation, Romanuk signed on to host a morning drive show on The Team 1050, CHUM Limited-owned newly re-branded sports AM station that had previously been operating for decades as 1050 CHUM in the oldies format.

CHUM Ltd. also brought in Mike Richards to be Romanuk's co-host in the morning while further managing to lure one of TSN's most prominent personalities Jim Van Horne away from television in order to pair him in the afternoon drive slot with The Globe and Mail's sports writer Stephen Brunt who had prior been appearing as pundit and guest host on Bob McCown's Prime Time Sports, the established afternoon drive show the newly assembled Team 1050 afternoon duo were now trying to compete with.

Unable to attract enough audience away from the legacy sports AM station in town Fan 590, in late summer 2002, Romanuk's morning show with Richards was cancelled as the entire station returned to the oldies format.

=== 2002–2005 ===
After the Team 1050 job, Romanuk began freelancing again, doing hosting work for Leafs TV among other gigs.

Owing to a friendship and past business collaboration with the Toronto Argonauts president and CEO Keith Pelley, Romanuk was hired to call radio play-by-play, alongside colour commentator Pete Martin, for the Argonauts games during the 2004 season.

In fall 2004, John Shannon and Nelson Millman, the management at the Telemedia-owned Fan 590 AM station, hired Romanuk as the radio play-by-play voice of the Toronto Raptors broadcasts alongside colour commentator Paul Jones. Romanuk ended up completing only the 2004–05 season before quitting.

=== Relocation to England ===
In terms of work, I naively thought: 'Well, you know, 15–20 years of credibility in the Canadian broadcast industry will be worth something [in England]'. Actually, it's worth nothing. I did work, but not at the level...... I mean, I didn't think I'd be calling football on Sky, which would be the equivalent of Hockey Night in Canada on CBC. I wasn't that stupid! But I did think I would get more work than I got. However, I had the wrong accent. And they're very xenophobic when it comes to things like that, as we are in Canada.... I would say that over the course of the 9 and a half years that we were there, I had what ranged between one and two-thirds of a job. I had a bunch of gigs.

— Romanuk on his professional endeavours while in London.

In spring 2005, Romanuk moved to London, England, following his wife who took an executive job at The Coca-Cola Company's European division. Arriving to London, he had nothing lined up professionally, initially just hoping to continue a career in sports broadcasting.

Settling in the Battersea area of London, Romanuk found work as a freelance sportscaster, performing various one-off jobs such as calling different sports (including hockey) on Eurosport. In the lead-up to the 2007 Asian Indoor Games in Macau, China, Romanuk was hired by a contract publishing company to edit a magazine for the games, a full-time job that had him commuting between London and Macau for about six months.

He additionally freelanced on the Canadian networks CBC, CTV, TSN, and Sportsnet coverage (either individual or consortium) of various international sporting events such as play-by-play announcing of triathlon and weightlifting at the 2012 Summer Olympics in London. Other such events included IIHF World Championships, Spengler Cups, and the 2010 FIFA World Cup.

He also did voice-over work for the International Ice Hockey Federation, did play-by-play commentary for the Champions Hockey League in 2008–09, and emceed the 2012 Hockey Forum in Barcelona and the draw of the re-launched CHL in 2014 in Minsk.

By the early 2010s, Romanuk and his wife moved to West London while she also switched from a marketing executive job at Coca-Cola to one with L'Oréal.

In 2014, the couple decided to move back to Toronto as Romanuk accepted an offer from Hockey Night in Canada.

=== Return to Canada ===
In November 2013, Rogers Media's $5.2 billion, twelve-year deal with the NHL for the national and regional broadcasting rights in Canada got announced. Approached by Rogers Media sports executives Keith Pelley and Scott Moore about being part of the broadcast team, Romanuk accepted and, after signing in June 2014 followed by arranging a move back to Canada in September 2014, re-joined Sportsnet as a play-by-play announcer for its national NHL coverage. He thus further became one of the new Hockey Night in Canada voices and personalities, a group that included new studio host George Stroumboulopoulos whose hiring received plenty of Canadian press coverage. Alongside analyst Greg Millen, Romanuk additionally became part of the regional Toronto Maple Leafs television package airing on Sportsnet Ontario.

In 2015, Romanuk was assigned to his first conference final. Until 2018, he was the number two play-by-play announcer for Rogers' NHL coverage (behind Jim Hughson). However, he did not call a single 2016 NHL conference final game for unknown reasons (Jim Hughson called that year's Eastern Conference Final while Bob Cole called that year's Western Conference Final). In 2017, he called his second conference final. He would go on to call three conference finals in four years.

In August 2018, Romanuk left Rogers NHL to pursue other challenges.

== Other work ==
He has also produced corporate films and television commercials. His most notable writing work is a series of children's books – Hockey Superstars – for Scholastic Publishing, Canada. He has written many newspaper and magazine articles and continues to create projects for various clients. in 2010 he produced a "Behind The Scenes" documentary of Canadian recording artist Tomi Swick's record, which was recorded in London.
