= Jim Van Horne =

- Born: December 15, 1950 (age 75); Toronto, Ontario, Canada
- Occupation: Television Personality

David Melnyk (born December 15, 1950), known professionally as Jim Van Horne, is a Canadian former sports anchor.

== Broadcasting career ==
=== Radio ===
Melnyk began his broadcasting career on CKMP in Midland, Ontario, in 1971. From 1972 to 1980, Van Horne was one of the top disc jockeys in Canada at 1050 CHUM in Toronto. It was when he was hired at CHUM he changed his name to Jim Van Horne when Dave Melnyk was deemed to be not rock’n’roll enough. He was named Billboard Magazine's Disc Jockey of the year in 1972, the only Canadian to ever claim the honour.

=== Switch to television ===
From 1980 to 1984, he was the late night sports anchor for CFAC-TV in Calgary, while hosting the Calgary Flames' NHL broadcasts. He was known for his walrus-size moustache and easy-going on-air personality.

He moved on to a long tenure with TSN where he was the primetime sports-anchor from the beginning of that sports network's history in 1984 until 2001. During his time on TSN, he covered numerous events including NHL hockey, alpine skiing, boxing, tennis, swimming, bowling, golf, and equestrian.

Van Horne has broadcast from five Olympic games, including 1988 in Calgary, covering alpine skiing, 2000 in Sydney covering tennis, 2008 in Beijing, assigned to baseball and softball, and 2010 Vancouver, mentoring the commentators from APTN, the Aboriginal Peoples Television Network, and worked in 2018 Pyeongchang on the worldwide live stream.
