= Pierre McGuire =

American-Canadian hockey executive and comnentator

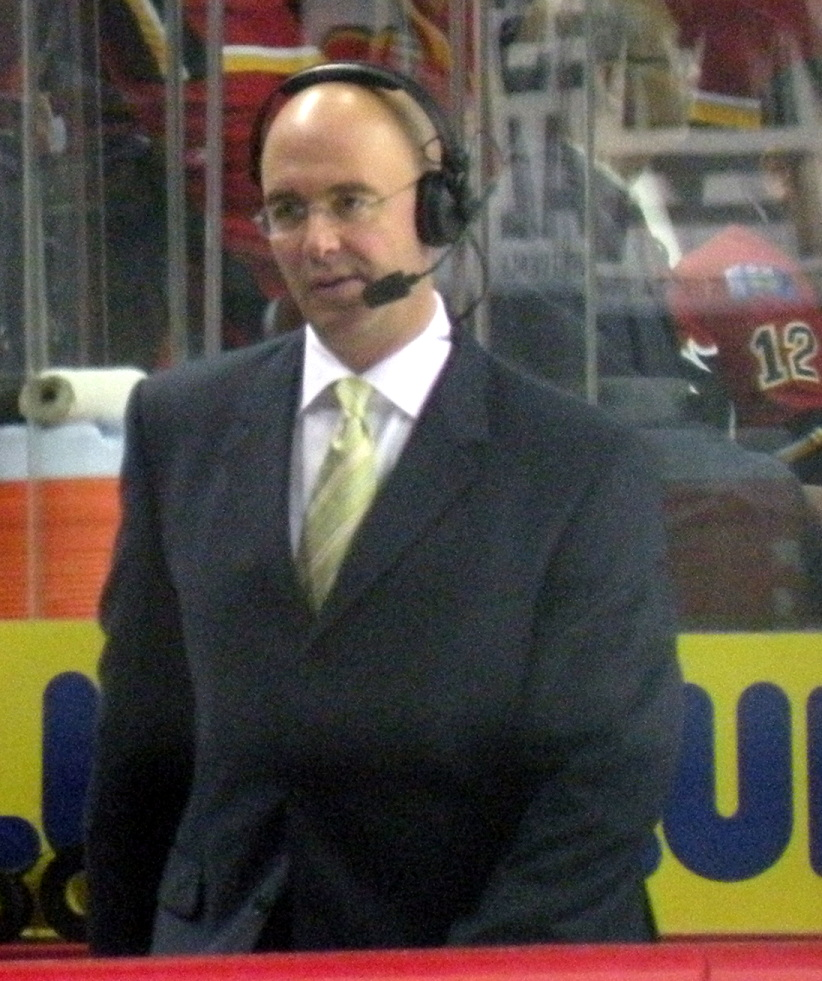
- McGuire in 2009
- Born: Regis Pierre McGuire; August 8, 1961 (age 65); Englewood, New Jersey, U.S.
- Education: Hobart College
- Occupation: Ice hockey executive
- Spouse: Melanie
- Children: 2
- Parent(s): Rex McGuire; Sally McGuire

Regis Pierre McGuire (born August 8, 1961) is an American-Canadian ice hockey executive who currently works for Sportsnet; he last served as senior vice-president of player development for the Ottawa Senators of the National Hockey League (NHL). He previously worked as a television analyst for NHL on NBC broadcasts in the United States and on The Sports Network (TSN) in Canada. McGuire has also been a player, coach, and scout.

== Early life ==
McGuire was born in Englewood Hospital in Englewood, New Jersey, the son of Rex, an Irish-American and Sally, a French-Canadian. He grew up in the Montreal area (in Mount Royal, Westmount and Sainte-Adèle) and attended Lower Canada College.

In 1977, his family moved to Cresskill, New Jersey, because of anti-anglophone sentiment in Montreal that made it difficult for McGuire's father to run his car dealership. McGuire attended Bergen Catholic High School, where he played football and hockey.

== Playing career ==
McGuire was a standout hockey defenceman at Hobart College from 1979 to 1982. He also pitched for Hobart's baseball team and played quarterback on the football team for two years. He graduated from Hobart with an English degree. After college, McGuire played one season of hockey in the Netherlands. In 1984, he attended the New Jersey Devils' training camp, but he did not make the team.

== Coaching and scouting career ==
=== Early career and Pittsburgh Penguins ===
McGuire began his coaching career at his alma mater, Hobart College, in 1984. He was paid only $500 a season; he made ends meet by working as a substitute English, math and physical education teacher in the Geneva, New York school district. In 1985, he was named assistant hockey and lacrosse coach at Babson College. At Babson, he coached hockey under future New York Islanders head coach Steve Stirling. After three seasons at Babson, he moved to St. Lawrence University, where he was an assistant hockey coach from 1988 to 1990. While at St. Lawrence, McGuire met Scotty Bowman, who frequently visited his daughter at the school. When Bowman became director of player development and recruitment for the Pittsburgh Penguins in 1990, he offered McGuire a job as a special assignment scout. When Bowman became interim head coach in 1991, McGuire was named an assistant coach. McGuire won a Stanley Cup as an assistant coach with the Pittsburgh Penguins in 1992.

=== Hartford Whalers ===
McGuire joined the Hartford Whalers on August 28, 1992 as an assistant coach; on September 8, 1993, he became the team's assistant general manager. On November 16, 1993, McGuire was named head coach of the Whalers, replacing Paul Holmgren. Holmgren had stepped aside due to frustration with insufficient effort from his players and a desire to focus on his role as the team's general manager. At age 32, McGuire was the youngest head coach in the NHL. Before becoming coach of the Whalers, McGuire had never been a head coach on any level. During his six months as the Whalers' head coach, McGuire coached the team to a 23–37–7 record. He was fired as head coach on May 19, 1994. After this termination, captain Pat Verbeek called it the best thing that could have happened to the Whalers. He said that his teammates had no respect for McGuire, and that McGuire was mocked by other teams. In 1995, NHL commissioner Gary Bettman ruled that McGuire would forfeit half of his remaining salary due from the Whalers for providing confidential coaching evaluations to the Edmonton Oilers. These evaluations had been prepared while McGuire was employed by Hartford.

=== Later career ===
Following his departure from the Whalers, McGuire became a scout with the Ottawa Senators. On November 22, 1995, he was promoted to the position of assistant coach. On January 23, 1996, McGuire was fired, along with head coach Dave Allison and goaltending coach Chico Resch.

On August 27, 1996, McGuire was named the inaugural head coach of the ECHL's Baton Rouge Kingfish. He was given a three-year contract. McGuire led the team to a 31–33–6 record and a seventh-place finish in the South Division. On July 12, 1997, McGuire exercised an escape clause in his contract to become the radio analyst for CJAD's broadcasts of Montreal Canadiens games.

== Broadcasting career ==
From 1997–98 to 2001–02, McGuire served as colour commentator for the Montreal Canadiens' English-language radio broadcasts on CJAD 800, along with Dino Sisto. He also worked on some of the team's regional television broadcasts on The Sports Network (TSN) when primary colour analyst Gary Green was unavailable, and was a contributor to TSN's That's Hockey.

When TSN re-acquired the Canadian national cable rights to NHL hockey in 2002, McGuire was hired as its lead colour commentator. With TSN, McGuire called the games along with play-by-play announcer Gord Miller or Chris Cuthbert. He also handled special hockey events for TSN, including the NHL entry draft and international events such as the IIHF World Junior Championships. In addition, he hosted a segment known as "McGuire's Monsters" where he covered a player who had significant impact through a combination of skills.

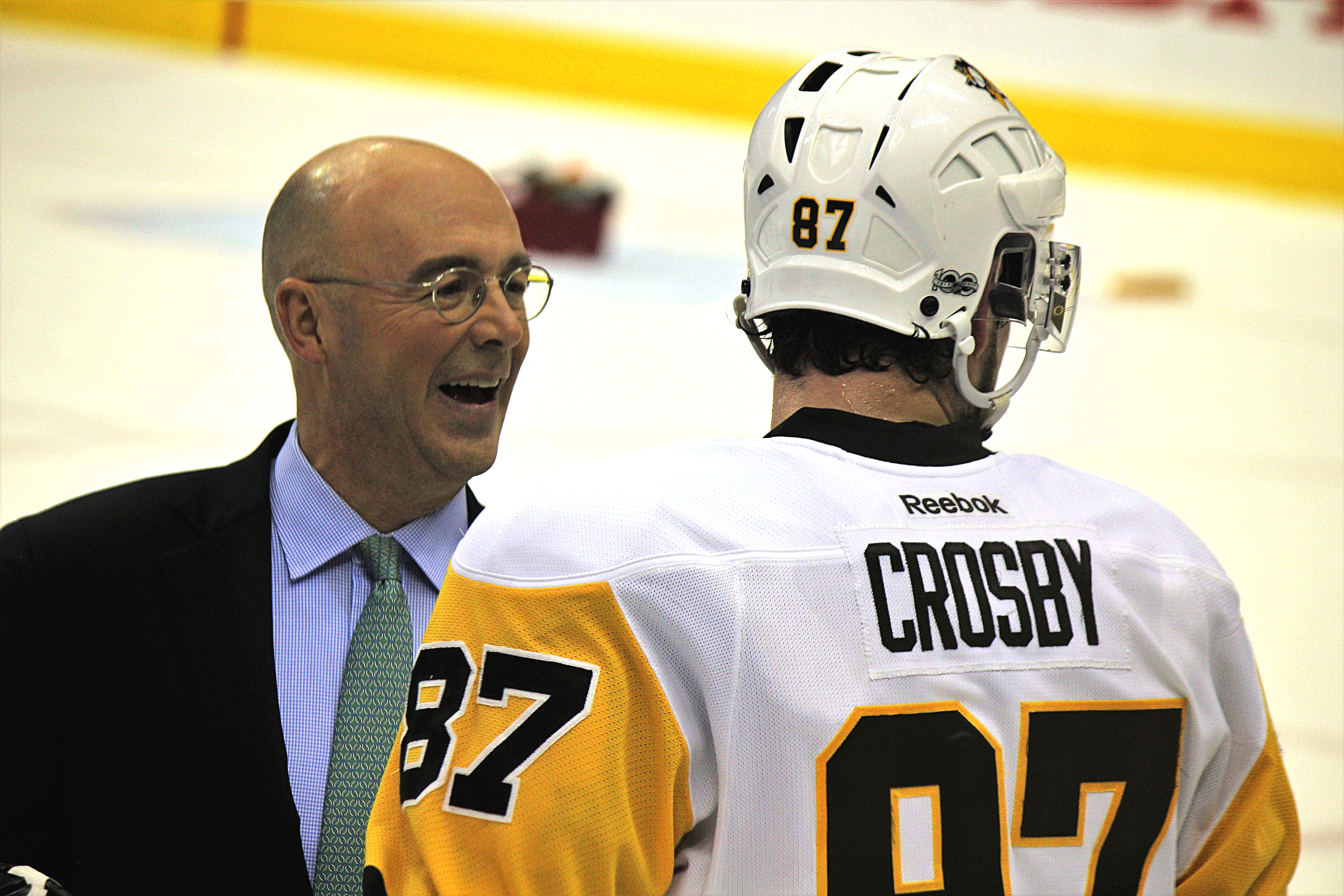
McGuire working for NBC during the 2017 Stanley Cup playoffs.

McGuire joined NBC Sports after they acquired the rights to NHL games in 2006. There he worked as an "Inside the Glass" reporter with the lead broadcast team of Mike Emrick and Eddie Olczyk. Not only did he extend that role with TSN beginning in 2006, but he also worked for both networks at the time, including the Ice Hockey - 2010 Winter Olympics.

After the 2011 NHL entry draft, McGuire left TSN to work full-time for NBC Sports, but he continues to appear on TSN Radio. From 2018 to 2021, he rotated with Brian Boucher on the broadcast team for NBC Sports.

McGuire also writes for Sports Illustrated and provides frequent audio commentary:

- New York's WFAN
- Toronto's Sportsnet 590
- Ottawa radio station the Team 1200
- the Ottawa Senators' fan podcast SensUnderground
- Montreal's TSN 690, where he can be heard on the Mitch Melnick show
- the TEAM 1040 in Vancouver, heard on the Canucks Lunch with Rick Ball
- Wednesday mornings on Calgary's Fan 960.

Beyond hockey, McGuire served as a reporter on water polo at the 2012 and 2016 Summer Olympic Games for NBC; he worked with NHL colleague Mike "Doc" Emrick in 2012, and with Kenny Albert in 2016.

In 2025, McGuire joined CBS Sports HQ as an NHL analyst.

== Management career ==
On July 12, 2021, the Ottawa Senators hired McGuire as the team's senior vice-president of player development. At that time, McGuire had not held a managerial job with the NHL for nearly three decades. On May 9, 2022, it was announced that McGuire had been let go from this position.

== Stances on issues in hockey ==
McGuire has been an outspoken advocate of removing the red line, which would allow skilled players to avoid the impediments of clutching and grabbing. In addition, he has campaigned for all players to wear partial visors. McGuire's outspoken personality led to an interesting story during the 2004–05 NHL lockout. McGuire claimed that more than 70% of NHL players, if asked to vote privately, would accept an owner-imposed salary cap; in response, NHL player Tie Domi said that McGuire was completely off-base. McGuire later retracted part of his claim, by saying that he should never have mentioned a percentage, but that he still strongly believed in his assertion. Ultimately, the players accepted a salary cap arrangement in the NHL Collective Bargaining Agreement that was ratified in 2005.

== Personal life ==
McGuire is a dual citizen of the United States and Canada. He has previously lived in Mount Royal, Quebec; Westmount, Quebec; Sainte-Adèle, Quebec; Cresskill, New Jersey; Alpine, New Jersey; Fort Lee, New Jersey; Hingham, Massachusetts; and Montreal. He currently lives in New Canaan, Connecticut. He has been married twice and has two children, both by his second wife.

== Coaching record ==
Team	Year	Regular season							Postseason
Team	Year	G	W	L	T	OTL	Pts	Finish	Result
HFD	1993–94	67	23	37	7	—	(53)	6th in Northeast	Missed playoffs

Preceded by Paul Holmgren	Head coach of the Hartford Whalers; 1993–94	Succeeded by Paul Holmgren
