= List of The Sports Network personalities =

Past and present television personalities on The Sports Network.

== Current ==
=== Analysts ===
- Jack Armstrong – Basketball analyst / Raptors on TSN color analyst
- Janine Beckie - Soccer analyst
- Craig Button – TSN Hockey Director of Scouting
- Steven Caldwell – Soccer analyst
- Wesley Cheng – TSN betting analyst
- Darren Dreger – TSN Hockey insider / studio analyst
- Julian de Guzman – Soccer analyst
- Duane Forde – CFL on TSN color analyst
- Cathy Gauthier – Curling on TSN color analyst
- Tim Hauraney – TSN Motorsport insider
- Russ Howard – Curling on TSN color analyst
- Mike Johnson – TSN Hockey studio analyst / color analyst
- Kevin Kilbane – Soccer analyst
- Paul LaPolice – CFL on TSN studio analyst
- Pierre LeBrun – TSN Hockey insider
- Jamie McLennan – TSN Hockey studio analyst / color analyst
- Henoc Muamba – CFL on TSN studio analyst
- Dave Naylor – Football insider
- Jeff O'Neill – TSN Hockey studio analyst
- Jesse Palmer – NFL on TSN analyst
- Steve Phillips – baseball insider
- Leo Rautins – Basketball analyst
- Davis Sanchez – CFL on TSN contributor
- Jevohn Shepherd – Basketball analyst
- Milt Stegall – CFL on TSN studio analyst
- Glen Suitor – CFL on TSN color analyst
- Bob Weeks – Golf analyst
- Luke Willson – NFL on TSN analyst

=== Anchors/Hosts ===
- Kate Beirness – SportsCentre anchor / CFL on TSN studio host
- Sarah Davis – SportsCentre anchor
- Laura Diakun – SportsCentre anchor
- James Duthie – TSN Hockey studio host
- Jermain Franklin – SportsCentre anchor
- Camila Gonzalez – Soccer on TSN host
- Lindsay Hamilton – SportsCentre anchor
- Jennifer Hedger – SportsCentre anchor
- Jay Onrait - SC with Jay Onrait host
- Mark Roe – SportsCentre / TSN Hockey / TSN Tennis anchor
- Gino Reda – That's Hockey host / TSN Hockey fill-in studio host (SportsCentre: Insider Trading)
- Nikki Reyes – SportsCentre anchor/reporter
- Glenn Schiller – SportsCentre anchor/reporter
- Tekeyah Singh – NFL on TSN host
- Adam Scully – SportsCentre / TSN Golf anchor/reporter
- Kara Wagland – SportsCentre / NFL on CTV anchor

=== Play-by-play ===
- Matt Devlin – Raptors on TSN play-by-play
- Marshall Ferguson – CFL on TSN play-by-play
- Gord Miller – Leafs on TSN, Sens on TSN, World Junior / World Hockey Championships and CFL on TSN play-by-play (also appears on ESPN)
- Bryan Mudryk – Habs on TSN play-by-play, Curling on TSN play-by-play (morning draw)
- Dustin Nielson – CFL on TSN play-by-play
- Dan Robertson – Jets on TSN play-by-play
- Rod Smith – CFL on TSN play-by-play
- Luke Wileman – Soccer on TSN play-by-play

=== Reporters ===
- TBA – Saskatchewan reporter
- Danielle Bain – Winnipeg reporter
- Claire Hanna – Ottawa reporter
- Farhan Lalji – Vancouver reporter
- Kenzie Lalonde – Montreal reporter
- Mark Masters – reporter
- Scott Mitchell – Baseball reporter
- Ryan Rishaug – Edmonton reporter
- Matthew Scianitti – Toronto reporter
- Raegan Subban – Raptors on TSN reporter
- Rick Westhead – Senior correspondent
- Salim Valji – Calgary reporter

== Former ==
=== Analysts ===
- Jock Climie – CFL on TSN studio analyst
- Gurdeep Ahluwalia – SportsCentre anchor
- David Archer – CFL on TSN colour analyst
- Matthew Barnaby – hockey analyst
- Cheryl Bernard - Season of Champions on TSN analyst
- Kerry Fraser – NHL refereeing analyst
- Less Browne – CFL on TSN studio analyst
- Dirk Hayhurst – baseball analyst
- Peter Burwash – tennis analyst
- Aaron Ward - TSN Hockey studio analyst
- Jason de Vos – Toronto FC and MLS colour analyst
- Marc Crawford – NHL on TSN studio analyst
- Terry Dunfield – soccer analyst
- Matt Dunigan - CFL on TSN studio analyst/color analyst
- Brian Engblom – Jets on TSN color analyst
- Ray Ferraro - TSN Hockey colour/studio analyst
- Gary Green – NHL on TSN colour analyst
- Glenn Healy – NHL on TSN colour analyst
- Shane Hnidy – Jets on TSN colour analyst
- Dick Howard – soccer colour analyst
- Mike Keenan – NHL on TSN studio analyst
- Tony Kubek – Toronto Blue Jays colour analyst
- Kristian Jack – soccer analyst
- Graham Leggat – soccer color analyst
- Craig MacTavish – NHL on TSN studio analyst
- Maggie the Macaque – NHL on TSN playoff prognosticator
- Buck Martinez – Toronto Blue Jays colour analyst
- Pierre McGuire - TSN Hockey game/studio analyst
- Bob McKenzie – TSN Hockey insider / studio analyst
- Danny McManus – CFL on TSN colour analyst
- Mike Milbury – NHL on TSN studio analyst
- Linda Moore —Curling on TSN colour analyst
- Harry Neale – Toronto Maple Leafs on TSN colour analyst
- Roger Neilson – NHL on TSN colour analyst
- Bob O'Billovich – CFL on TSN studio analyst
- Darren Pang — NHL on TSN studio analyst
- Michael Peca – NHL on TSN studio analyst
- Leif Pettersen – CFL on TSN colour analyst
- Vera Pezer – curling colour analyst
- Warren Sawkiw – Montreal Expos colour analyst
- Kevin Sawyer - Hockey analyst
- Chris Schultz – CFL on TSN studio analyst
- Dan Shulman – March Madness on TSN studio analyst; also featured in SportsCentre segments (former Toronto Blue Jays, NHL on TSN, CHL on TSN and NBA on TSN play-by-play; now play-by-play for ESPN, although TSN may simulcast games he calls)
- Ken Singleton – Toronto Blue Jays colour analyst
- Pat Tabler – Toronto Blue Jays analyst
- Eric Tillman – CFL on TSN studio analyst
- John Tortorella – NHL on TSN studio analyst
- Ray Turnbull – Curling on TSN colour analyst
- Ryan Walter – NHL on TSN colour analyst
- Bill Watters – NHL on TSN studio analyst
- Henry Burris – CFL on TSN analyst
- Tracy Wilson – Figure Skating colour analyst
- Jabari Greer – NFL on TSN analyst

=== Anchors/Hosts ===
- David Amber – SportsCentre anchor
- Thea Andrews – Guys TV host
- Rod Black – CFL on TSN, Women's World Hockey Championships and Figure Skating play-by-play
- Tessa Bonhomme – SportsCentre anchor and TSN Hockey studio host
- Brendan Connor – SportsCentre anchor
- Darren Dutchyshen – SportsCentre anchor / TSN Hockey fill-in studio host
- Kayla Grey - “SportsCentre” anchor/reporter
- Dave Hodge – The Reporters host
- Mark Jones – SportsCentre anchor
- Steve Kouleas — That's Hockey 2Nite host
- Terry Leibel – SportsDesk anchor
- Dan O'Toole - SC with Jay and Dan co-host
- Dan Pollard – SportsCentre anchor
- David Pratt – Last Call host
- Blake Price - anchor
- Dave Randorf - SportsCentre anchor, CFL on TSN studio host
- Lorne Rubenstein – Acura World of Golf host
- Natasha Staniszewski – SportsCentre anchor
- Mike Toth – SportsDesk anchor and Baseball Tonight host
- Jim Van Horne – SportsDesk anchor and NHL on TSN studio host
- John Wells – NHL on TSN studio host, SportsDesk anchor, TSN Sunday host
- Brian Williams - Olympic Games host, figure skating host and CFL on TSN contributor.
- Cory Woron - ‘’SportsCentre’’ anchor

=== Play-by-play ===
- Dennis Beyak – Jets on TSN and World Junior / World Hockey Championships play-by-play
- Don Chevrier – curling play by play
- Chris Cuthbert - CFL on TSN and TSN Hockey play-by-play
- Jim Hughson – NHL on TSN, Montreal Expos, and Toronto Blue Jays play-by-play
- Tommy Hutton – Montreal Expos play-by-play
- Fergie Olver – Toronto Blue Jays play-by-play
- Dave Randorf— NHL on TSN, CFL on TSN, Montreal Canadiens on TSN, and World Hockey Championships play-by-play
- Vic Rauter – Curling on TSN play-by-play
- Paul Romanuk – NHL on TSN play-by-play, CHL on TSN play-by-play
- John Saunders – Toronto Raptors play-by-play
- Chuck Swirsky – Toronto Raptors play-by-play
- Jerry Trupiano – World League of American Football play-by-play
- Dave Van Horne – Montreal Expos play-by-play

=== Reporters ===
- Lisa Bowes – Winnipeg and Calgary reporter
- Shawn Churchill - Winnipeg reporter
- James Cybulski – Toronto reporter
- Brit Dort – Saskatchewan reporter
- Michael Farber– Montreal reporter
- Sheri Forde — Toronto reporter
- Kayla Grey – Raptors on TSN reporter
- John Lu – Winnipeg reporter
- Nancy Newman – SportsDesk reporter
- Frank Seravalli - Senior Hockey reporter
- Alex J. Walling – Halifax/Atlantic Canada reporter
- Sara Orlesky – Winnipeg reporter, JETS on TSN host

== Producers ==
- Paul Graham, vice-president and executive producer from 2010 to 2025

== See also ==
- List of NHL on TSN commentating crews
