= List of programs broadcast by TSN =

This is a list of past and present programs broadcast by the Canadian television channels TSN and TSN 2.

== Present ==
=== News / Analysis ===
- Motoring
- SC with Jay and Dan
- SportsCentre

=== Documentary ===
- 30 for 30
- Engraved on a Nation

=== Talk / Debate ===
- Around the Horn
- CFL Wired
- First Take
- Golf Talk Canada
- Highly Questionable
- Open Gym
- Outside the Lines
- OverDrive
- Pardon the Interruption
- That's Hockey
- That's Hockey 2Nite

=== Baseball ===
- NCAA Baseball on TSN
- MLB on TSN

=== Basketball ===
- CEBL on TSN
- NBA on TSN
- NBA G League on TSN
- WNBA on TSN

=== Football ===
- CFL on TSN
- NFL Monday Night Football

=== Curling ===
- Curling on TSN
- Season of Champions on TSN
- TSN Skins Game

=== Golf ===
- PGA Tour on TSN

=== Hockey ===
- IIHF World Junior Championship
- NHL Wednesday Night Hockey
- TSN Hockey

=== Motorsports ===
- Formula 1 on TSN
- Formula E on TSN
- IndyCar on TSN
- NASCAR Cup Series
- NASCAR Xfinity Series
- NASCAR Canada Series
- SCCC on TSN

=== Lacrosse ===
- PLL on TSN

=== Pro Wrestling ===
- AEW Collision
- AEW Dynamite
- AEW Rampage

=== Soccer ===
- FIFA World Cup
- FIFA Women's World Cup
- La Liga on TSN
- MLS on TSN
- NWSL on TSN

=== Tennis ===
- French Open
- Rogers Cup

=== Multi Sport Events ===
- X Games; both summer and winter
- Olympic Games; both summer and winter

== Past ==
=== Talk / Debate ===
- Leafs Lunch
- Off the Record with Michael Landsberg
- NBA: The Jump

=== Pro Wrestling ===
- American Wrestling Association
- Pro Wrestling Plus
- Stampede Wrestling
- WCW Monday Nitro
- WWE Raw

=== Combat Sports ===
- Friday Night Fights
- UFC Fight Night

== See also ==
- The Sports Network
