= That's Hockey 2Nite =

Canadian television series

That's Hockey 2Nite is a Canadian television series on TSN which presented the latest news in hockey as well as panelists and interviews with hockey personalities. The host was Steve Kouleas, while Matthew Barnaby, among others, served as analysts.

The show usually aired following the game at 9:30pm ET on the main network.

The show debuted February 1, 2011 on TSN2. The show would end with a segment called "The Good, The Bad and The Ugly".

== See also ==
- That's Hockey
