= Steve Kouleas =

Canadian sportscaster

- Born: Toronto, Ontario, Canada
- Occupations: Television anchor, hockey broadcaster

Steve Kouleas (born in Toronto, Ontario, Canada) is a Canadian television anchor, hockey broadcaster and currently radio host on SiriusXM NHL Network Radio channel 91 (The Power Play). Kouleas has also worked for TSN. He hosted the weeknight hockey program That's Hockey 2Nite on TSN2, as well as the weekday hockey program That's Hockey 2Day on TSN Radio 1050.

Kouleas has been working in television and radio throughout North America for more than 20 years. In 2009, he was nominated for a Gemini Award for Best Sportscaster/Anchor in Canada.

== Background ==
Kouleas was born in Toronto, Ontario, Canada. He is a graduate of Ryerson University's Radio and Television Arts program. He is of Macedonian descent.

== Broadcasting career ==
Kouleas has worked in the television and radio industry in Canada and the United States for more than 20 years. He formerly worked for The Score from 1997 to 2010, covering the National Hockey League (NHL). He last worked for The Sports Network (TSN), and hosted the weeknight hockey program That's Hockey 2Nite on TSN2, as well as the weekday hockey program That's Hockey 2Day on TSN Radio 1050. Kouleas has also worked for CBC, CBS, ESPN, and NBC. He covered Team Canada during the 2010 Winter Olympics.

=== Television ===
Kouleas began his career at The Sports Network (TSN) as an associate producer of SportsDesk in 1990, and worked at the network for seven years. He decided to step away from producing, and instead joined The Score as its lead anchor. Following his departure from TSN, Kouleas worked at The Score as its lead anchor for thirteen years. While at The Score, Kouleas covered numerous sports and sporting events, including the National Hockey League (NHL)'s Stanley Cup Final, trade deadline, and Entry Draft. He also covered several topics for the National Basketball Association (NBA). After thirteen years with The Score, Kouleas parted ways with the network.

TSN announced on December 8, 2010 that Kouleas would re-join the network, as a part of their National Hockey League (NHL) broadcast team. Kouleas hosts the weeknight hockey program That's Hockey 2Nite, which premiered on February 1, 2011 on TSN2.

I've waited 13 years to come back to TSN, so it's a dream come true that I'm returning to the network
and becoming a part of the best hockey broadcast team in Canada.

— Steve Kouleas

As of the start of the 2014-2015 NHL season, Kouleas was no longer listed as a member of TSN's talent.

=== Radio ===
Kouleas hosts a weekday hockey show on SiriusXM the NHL Network called The Power Play airs on channel 91 from 3-6pm EST. Steve has also hosted on TSN Radio 1050 which debuted on April 13, 2011 called That's Hockey 2Day. He previously hosted the interactive radio show, Live from Wayne Gretzky's, which is taped at Wayne Gretzky’s Restaurant in Toronto, Ontario. Kouleas has also done radio and television play-by-play for the Buffalo Sabres of the National Hockey League (NHL), as well as the American Hockey League (AHL). He has made radio appearances on Sirius Satellite Radio and XM Satellite Radio. He has also called play-by-play for other minor and junior hockey leagues.

== Honours ==
On August 25, 2009, Kouleas was nominated for a Gemini Award for Best Sportscaster/Anchor in Canada, alongside future TSN co-workers James Duthie (as anchor on the NHL on TSN's TradeCentre '09 panel), and Darren Dutchyshen (as co-host of SportsCentre). Duthie would go on to win the award.

== Other appearances ==
Kouleas plays himself in the 2010 Canadian film Score: A Hockey Musical.
