= CCFC =

CCFC may refer to:

== Football clubs ==
In England:

- Cambridge City F.C., Cambridgeshire, England
- Chelmsford City F.C., Essex, England
- Chester City F.C., Cheshire, England
- Chichester City F.C., West Sussex, England
- Clapton Community F.C., London, England
- Coventry City F.C., West Midlands, England

In India:

- Calcutta Cricket and Football Club, Kolkata, India
- Chennai City F.C., Tamil Nadu, India

In Ireland:

- Cork Celtic F.C., Munster, Ireland
- Cork City F.C., Munster, Ireland

In Northern Ireland:

- Carryduff Colts F.C., County Down, Northern Ireland
- Chimney Corner F.C., County Antrim, Northern Ireland
- Craigavon City F.C., County Armagh, Northern Ireland

In Wales:

- Cardiff City F.C., Wales

== Other uses ==
- Campaign for a Commercial-Free Childhood, an American healthcare coalition
- Campus Crusade for Christ, an interdenominational Christian organization
- Christian Children's Fund of Canada
- Compagnie du Chemin de Fer du Congo (Railway Company of the Congo)
