= Natasha Staniszewski =

Canadian sports reporter (born 1978)

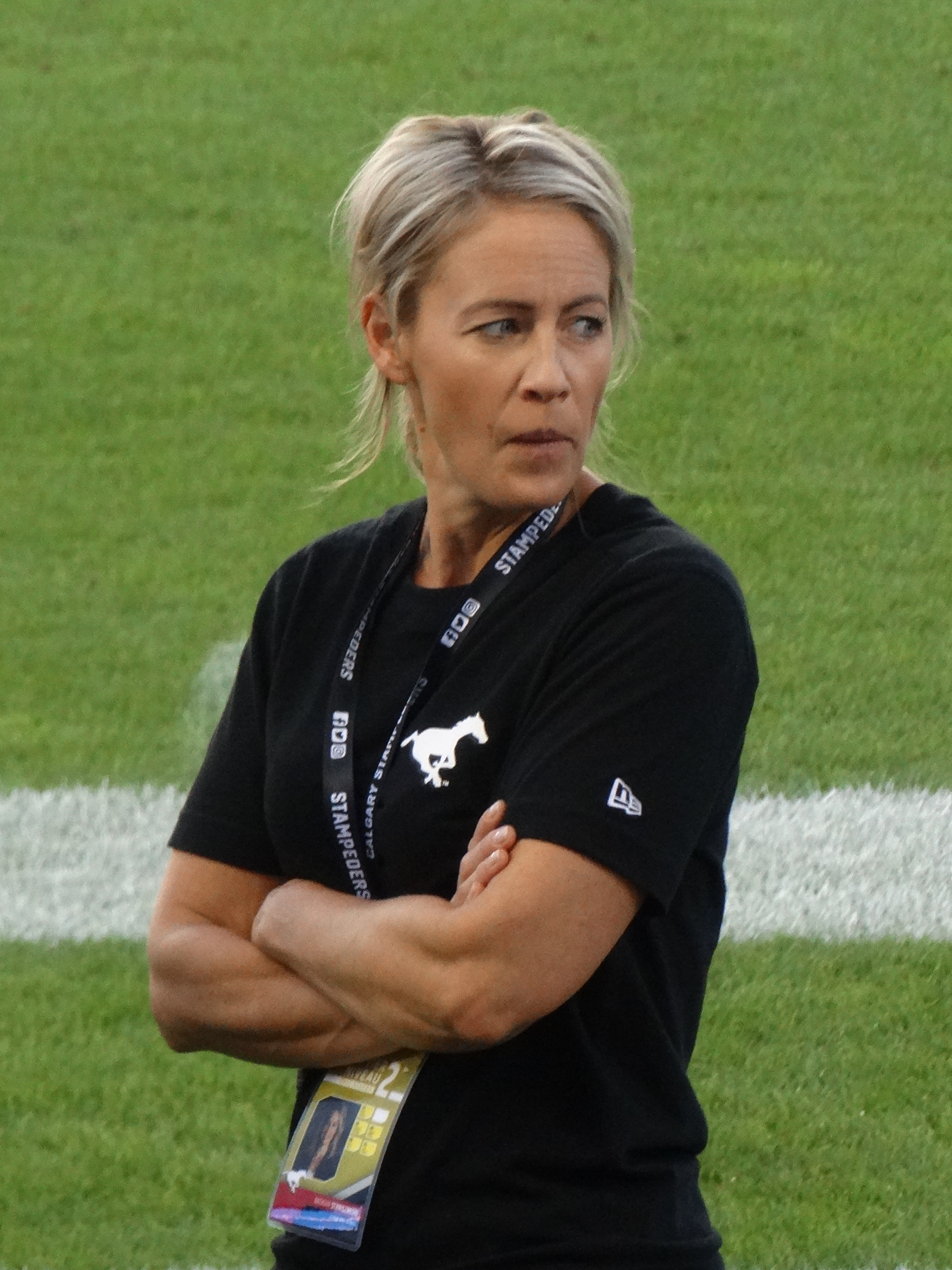
- Born: May 25, 1978 (age 48); Edmonton, Alberta
- Occupation: Sports Broadcaster
- Known for: SportsCentre, TSN

Natasha Staniszewski (born May 25, 1978) is a Canadian sports reporter and media host for the Calgary Flames and Calgary Stampeders. She is a former anchor on SportsCentre, TSN's flagship news and information show.

== Broadcasting career ==
Staniszewski began her career in 2006 as a news reporter at CTV Yorkton in Saskatchewan, before moving to sports reporting at CTV Prince Albert. In 2007, she relocated to CTV Saskatoon as the station's sports anchor and reporter, covering the WHL and university athletics.

Two years later, in 2009, Staniszewski returned to CTV Edmonton, where she covered the Edmonton Oilers, the Edmonton Eskimos, and the 2010 Grey Cup, while anchoring the station's top-rated nightly and weekend sportscasts. After covering the 2010 Grey Cup, TSN vice-president Mark Melliere sought someone to fill Jennifer Hedger's anchor position during her maternity leave. Staniszewski eventually co-hosted the weekend SportsCentre alongside Bryan Mudryk following Holly Horton's departure in 2011. Soon after, she moved to the morning SportsCentre, co-hosting with Kate Beirness and becoming the first regular female duo to anchor the show. She later anchored SportsCentre regularly with another female, Lindsay Hamilton, serving as an alternative morning show to SC with Jay and Dan.

On February 4, 2021, after 10 years at TSN, Staniszewski was let go as part of a series of layoffs at Bell Media. On March 8, 2022, it was announced that she had been hired by Calgary Sports and Entertainment as a media host for the Calgary Flames and Calgary Stampeders.

== Personal life ==
Staniszewski was born and raised in Edmonton, Alberta, and is of Polish descent.

She was an athlete growing up, excelling in basketball and volleyball, won a provincial title in volleyball in high school. She then earned a business degree from the University of Alberta but decided at the age of 26 that she did not want to pursue a career in business, but rather a career as a sports broadcaster. She went on to complete her broadcasting degree at NAIT in Edmonton.
