= Ryan Rishaug =

Canadian ice hockey player (born 1977)

- Born: May 29, 1977 (age 49) Sherwood Park, Alberta, Canada
- Height: 6 ft 1 in (185 cm)
- Weight: 195 lb (88 kg; 13 st 13 lb)
- Position: Right Wing
- Shot: Right
- Playing career: 1995–1997

Ryan Rishaug (born May 29, 1977) is a sports broadcaster with TSN. He is currently the Edmonton Bureau Reporter for SportsCentre, TSN's flagship sports news program, and hosts The Morning Mandate with Ryan Rishaug every weekday at 8:35 a.m. on Edmonton Sports Talk and as of 2024, Ryan hosts the GYB podcast with Jason Strudwick and Rob Brown.

== Early life ==
Rishaug was born in Sherwood Park, Alberta. Before entering sports broadcasting, he played 47 games in the WHL hockey league, at right wing on the Kamloops Blazers. He attended the Broadcast Communications program at the British Columbia Institute of Technology.

== Broadcasting career ==
Rishaug began his broadcasting career in 1998, as a sports reporter at CFJC-TV in Kamloops, British Columbia. He also worked as a sports anchor and reporter for CTV owned-and-operated station Sudbury-based CICI-TV from 1999 to 2000 and as a sports anchor for Global owned-and-operated station CFSK-TV in Saskatoon, Saskatchewan in 2000.

Rishaug joined CTV's CFRN in 2000, serving as the station's weekend sports anchor before moving to the weekday 6 p.m. sports anchor desk. He also appeared on TSN as a sideline reporter for the network's CFL Friday Night Football telecasts in 2003.

In 2004, Rishaug was named TSN's new Edmonton reporter for SportsCentre, after veteran TSN reporter Ken Chilibeck retired from the position. He reports on the Edmonton Oilers, the Edmonton Elks, and any other sports from the Edmonton area. He also currently hosts The Morning Mandate with Ryan Rishaug every weekday at 8:30 a.m. on TSN 1260, a segment on The Nielson Show hosted by TSN's Dustin Nielson.

In April 2019, Rishaug reported and fronted the TSN original documentary 29 Forever, which tells the story of the 2017-18 Humboldt Broncos junior hockey team in honour of the one-year anniversary of the 2018 Humboldt Broncos bus crash.
