= Kate Beirness =

Canadian television sportscaster

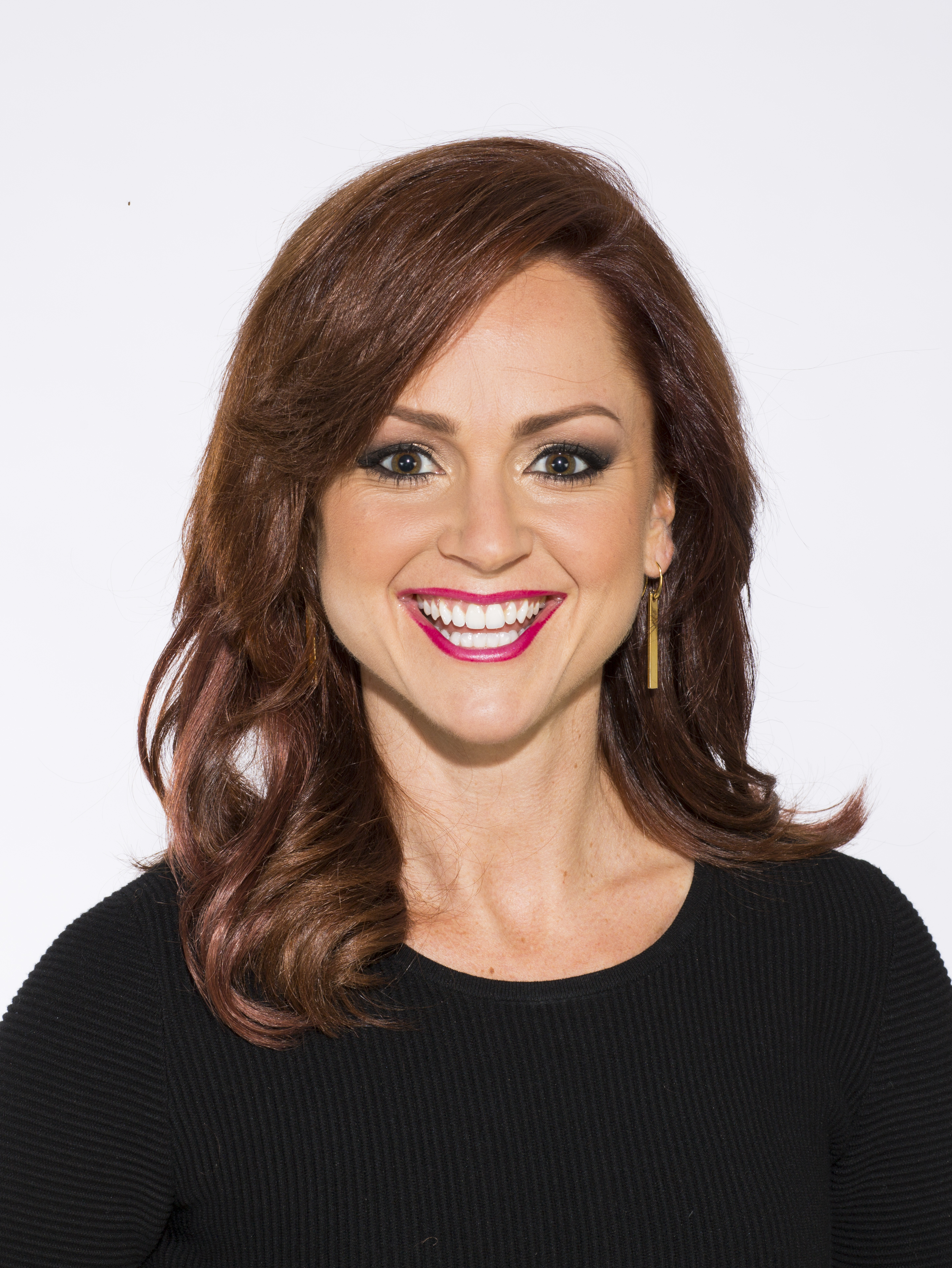
- Beirness in 2016
- Born: March 8, 1984 (age 42); Port Perry, Ontario
- Education: University of Ontario Institute of Technology
- Occupation: Sports broadcaster
- Employer: TSN
- Partner: Darren Dutchyshen

Kate Beirness (/bərˈnɛs/ bər-NESS; born March 8, 1984) is a Canadian television sportscaster, currently working as a host for SportsCentre on TSN.

== Career ==
During her first year hosting SportsCentre, Beirness often worked with Bryan Mudryk on the weekend Sportscentre, and continued to do so through much of 2013. In October 2013, Beirness and new co-host Darren Dutchyshen took over the late night and morning loop spots on TSN, replacing the departing Jay Onrait and Dan O'Toole. The pair had worked together during Jennifer Hedger's maternity leave in 2011. Dutchyshen would move back to the nightly Sportscentre with Hedger, and was replaced by Natasha Staniszewski. Beirness and Staniszewski formed Sportscentre's first ever female anchor team.

Beirness currently hosts CFL on TSN & Toronto Raptors coverage as well as TSN's NCAA March Madness coverage.

Prior to joining TSN, Kate worked for Rogers TV as a sports reporter and on A Barrie as the sports anchor.

Beirness founded and hosts Her Mark summit, an annual one day event aimed at empowering the next generation of Canadian female leaders. The first summit was held on July 8, 2017 at BMO Field Toronto, ON.

== Personal life ==
Beirness was born and raised in Port Perry, Ontario and is a graduate of the University of Ontario Institute of Technology. She was a standout basketball player throughout high school until a torn ACL forced her to switch gears and pursue a career in sports broadcasting.

Beirness was in a long-term relationship with TSN colleague Darren Dutchyshen until his death in 2024, although this was not publicly revealed until after Dutchyshen's death.
