= Daren Millard =

Canadian sportscaster (born 1970)

- Born: August 16, 1970 (age 56); Brandon, Manitoba, Canada
- Education: Western Academy Broadcasting College
- Occupation: Sportscaster
- Employer(s): AT&T SportsNet (Vegas Golden Knights TV Crew)
- Spouse: Jennifer Millard

Daren Millard (born August 16, 1970 in Brandon, Manitoba, Canada) is a Canadian sportscaster and amateur ice hockey goaltender who currently works for the Vegas Golden Knights of the National Hockey League.

In his youth, Millard played junior ice hockey with the Dauphin Kings. Millard and his brother Dean (who works radio and television in Edmonton) both attended Western Academy Broadcasting College in Saskatoon, Saskatchewan. Millard began his broadcasting career in radio as he worked in cities including Melfort, Saskatchewan, Portage la Prairie, Manitoba, Yorkton, Saskatchewan and Brandon, Manitoba and in television for CKX-TV in Brandon, Global Winnipeg and at CITV-TV. Millard joined Sportsnet in 1998 and held a number of roles throughout his time at the network which included hosting the coverage of the 2010 Winter Olympics men's ice hockey, Wednesday Night Hockey, Hockey Central at Noon, and regional Toronto Maple Leafs hockey games. He also appeared on Tim & Sid. On August 1, 2018 it was announced that Millard was leaving the network.

In September 2019, Millard began working the broadcast booth for the Vegas Golden Knights of the National Hockey League. Millard is also the current emergency back-up goaltender (EBUG) for the Golden Knights; he previously acted as a practice goaltender for the team for several years prior to becoming the team's EBUG in 2026.
