= SportsCentre =

Canadian sports news television series

- Also known as: SportsDesk (original title; 1984–2001)
- Based on: SportsCenter by Chet Simmons and ESPN
- Presented by: See below
- Opening theme: "SportsCenter Theme" (2001–present)
- Ending theme: Same as opening
- Country of origin: Canada
- Original language: English

Production
- Production locations: 9 Channel Nine Court, Scarborough, Toronto, Ontario
- Camera setup: Multi-camera
- Running time: Varies; usually 60+ minutes
- Production company: TSN

Original release
- Network: TSN (1984–present); CTV (2007–2020, Weekends)
- Release: September 1, 1984 – present

SportsCentre (SC) is a Canadian daily sports news television program sports news television program, and the flagship program on TSN. The program airs several times daily TSN feeds, and on weekends on CTV.

== History ==
The program was launched under its original title SportsDesk the same day as TSN itself debuted, on September 1, 1984. It retained that title until September 5, 2001, when the program was relaunched under a similar look and format to American cable network ESPN's flagship sportscast SportsCenter, with the title rendered in Canadian spelling. It also uses the current ESPN SportsCenter theme. The change in name occurred after majority ownership in TSN had been turned over to CTV the previous year when it acquired 80% of the network; the transaction required the approval of existing minority shareholder ESPN, which did so on the condition that TSN align its branding and programming more closely with ESPN's, and with it, also introducing a new logo that was akin to that of ESPN's. Since relaunching as SportsCentre, the program has normally originated from the CTV (now Bell Media) Agincourt studios at 9 Channel Nine Court in Scarborough, Toronto, Ontario.

On September 25, 2006, SportsCentre began broadcasting in high definition. At that time, TSN expressed hopes to have all reports from its bureaus in HD in the near future.

In the early 2010s, the program drew significant attention, including from media in the United States, for its 1 a.m. ET/morning-loop anchor team of Jay Onrait and Dan O'Toole, which had taken the program in a much more irreverent and comedic direction. The Wall Street Journal published a feature story on the pair titled "Why Can't We Have Canada's 'SportsCentre'?", which compared the Onrait-O'Toole pairing to the likes of 1990s ESPN SportsCenter anchors Keith Olbermann and Craig Kilborn.

The attention eventually led to Onrait, O'Toole, and their longtime producer Tim Moriarty all being hired by Fox Sports in the U.S. to help launch its new national cable channel Fox Sports 1 in 2013. Onrait and O'Toole served as hosts of Fox Sports Live, which was initially a competitor to the U.S. version of SportsCenter on ESPN (and later relaunched as a sports-oriented talk show), until February 2017 when Fox cancelled the show and allowed their contracts to expire. Jay and Dan were later rehired by TSN becoming the anchors of a new rebranded midnight ET edition of SportsCentre, SC with Jay and Dan.

=== Kraft Celebration Tour ===
From 2009 to 2014, for ten days in late August and/or early September of each year, SportsCentre travelled to ten communities across Canada under the banner of the "Kraft Celebration Tour". Two teams of anchors, one starting in the East and the other in the West, broadcast on alternating days during the tour. Each of the ten host communities received a minimum C$25,000 grant from Kraft Foods to support a community project related to sports or active living.

Host communities were nominated by local residents and submissions are reviewed by a TSN/Kraft judging panel. From 2009 to 2013, the panel named the top 20 finalists each year (10 pairs of two) which were reduced to the ten hosts via online voting. In 2014, the judging panel named all ten hosts directly, with the public instead voting on the winner of a new $100,000 grand prize, and the nine other communities winning $25,000 as before. While the main judging criteria were related to the value of the proposed project and overall submission quality, production logistics and "the need to create a viable cross-Canada tour" were also considerations. The majority of provinces were represented each year, though some provinces sometimes had multiple hosts per year, meaning that smaller provinces (most frequently one or more in Atlantic Canada) were skipped in some years. No community in the territories was selected prior to 2013, when Fort Smith, Northwest Territories was selected in online voting over Whitehorse, Yukon.

In 2015, the Kraft Celebration Tour was replaced with a new initiative, Kraft Project Play, which involves increased funding for community projects, but no longer includes live on-location broadcasts of SportsCentre.

=== 2020 coronavirus pandemic reaction ===
On March 11, 2020, the NBA announced that it would suspend its season indefinitely following the conclusion of that night's games as a result of Rudy Gobert testing positive for COVID-19 before a game between the Utah Jazz and the Oklahoma City Thunder in Oklahoma City, which caused the game to be initially postponed. The following day, all of the other major sports leagues followed suit in suspending their seasons for an indefinite period in order to combat the COVID-19 pandemic, and other sporting events were also canceled after plans to hold them without an audience fell through. After the cancellations were announced, TSN aired special editions of the program chronicling the effects of the pandemic and its impact on sporting events and the athletes' reactions to the pandemic via social media.

Following a hiatus of original broadcasts, production of SportsCentre and SC with Jay and Dan resumed on April 6, 2020, with anchors and editorial staff working from their homes. Studio production of SportsCentre resumed in mid-June 2020. Airings of ESPN's SportsCenter and Get Up! were also added to the TSN schedule to provide supplemental news content.

== Scheduling ==
TSN generally produces three editions of SportsCentre each day, all of which are usually at least one hour in length: early evening (6:00 p.m. ET), late evening in the East (typically 10:00 p.m. ET), and late evening in the West (1:00 a.m. ET). The latter broadcast is repeated on an hourly loop throughout the overnight and morning hours, typically running until 1:00 p.m. ET. Since the launch of TSN2 in 2008, some editions (and repeats) have occasionally aired on that channel in the event of programming conflicts on TSN. TSN has gradually increased the length and, in some cases, repetition of SportsCentre broadcasts such that the program is now sometimes carried for up to 16.5 hours out of the day (including "morning loop" repeats) on either TSN or TSN2 (this is similar to the expansion of SportsCenter broadcasts on ESPN since 2008, although with fewer live telecasts).

For a time, TSN2 also carried an abbreviated highlights-only broadcast called SportsCentre Morning Rush, which aired on a 15-minute loop during the morning hours. This program has since been replaced with TSN Radio simulcasts and repeats of other TSN-produced programs such as That's Hockey 2Nite.

Beginning with the 2007 NFL season, extra editions have been produced for sister network CTV as its post-game program for early-window Sunday afternoon NFL games. On weekends, CTV also airs repeats of the previous night's late edition of SportsCentre at noon local time.

On September 4, 2017, a new midnight ET edition, SC with Jay and Dan was introduced, which was hosted by Jay Onrait and Dan O'Toole as a distinct version of their previous tenure as late-night anchors of the program prior to their move to Fox Sports 1. On February 2, 2021, Bell Media (TSN's majority owner) released O'Toole from the program, re-naming it SC with Jay Onrait.

== Format ==
For a 60-minute broadcast, the first half-hour typically contains highlights for the day's biggest events, sometimes with a weekly feature (such as "Plays of the Week" or "Ultimate SC") towards the end of that half-hour. The first segment of the second half-hour typically returns to the top two or three stories with packaged reports and/or panel analysis, which is followed by additional highlights and other features. Some highlights segments are given individual names at their conclusion (for example, "NHL Wrap-Up" or "Golf Report") for the apparent sole purpose of providing sponsorship opportunities related to those sports and are otherwise indistinguishable from the rest of the show.

The second-to-last segment traditionally contains two daily features: the "Honour Roll", which is a collection of the best plays of the day in no particular order, and (on weeknights) the "SportsCentre Top 10", a countdown of past sports highlights with some theme, typically related to a recent sports event (typical topics might include: "Game 6 Performances Forcing a Game 7", "Odd Celebrity Moments", or "Objects Thrown by Spectators"; the Friday night/Saturday morning topic is almost always "Top 10 Must-See Moments" of the past week). This differs from ESPN's SportsCenter Top 10, which is usually just the top 10 plays of the day. The final segment includes the "Worst Play of the Day" and the "Highlight of the Night", the latter chosen from the Honour Roll highlights.

In 2014, an online-poll feature titled "1v1", sponsored by Ram Trucks, was added to the closing segment of SportsCentre five nights per week (Sunday night/Monday morning through Thursday/Friday). Each day's poll pairs a reigning "champion" highlight (with a ten-day maximum) with a "challenger" (usually that edition's Highlight of the Night). This caused the Highlight of the Night announcement to be moved to the second-last segment right after the Top 10, and later the Honour Roll to be moved to the third-last segment. The traditional format is still used Friday and Saturday nights (Saturday and Sunday mornings).

The early-evening (6:00 p.m. ET) edition varies from the above format slightly as it mostly previews the night's games and covers other off-field sports news, along with any daytime highlights. The second half-hour is largely a repeat of the first, with the exception of some features such as the extra segment of Pardon the Interruption produced for ESPN's SportsCenter in the first half, and the "Honour Roll Encore" (a repeat of the previous night's set of top highlights) at the end of the broadcast.

== On-air staff ==
=== Current anchors ===
- Kate Beirness (2009–present)
- Sarah Davis (2018–present)
- Laura Diakun (2015–present)
- Jermain Franklin (2020–present)
- Kayla Grey (2018–2026)
- Lindsay Hamilton (2016–present)
- Jennifer Hedger (2002–present)
- Jay Onrait (2002–2013, 2017–present)
- Mark Roe (sportscaster) (2015–present)
- Nikki Reyes (2020–present)
- Glenn Schiiler (2013–present)
- Adam Scully (2022–present)
- Rod Smith (1995–present)
- Kara Wagland (2014–present)

=== Former anchors ===
- Gurdeep Ahluwalia (2012–2016)
- David Amber
- Nabil Karim (2012–2019)
- Rod Black
- Tessa Bonhomme (2014–2024)
- Lisa Bowes (1997–1999)
- Lisa Hillary
- Brendan Connor (1992–1998)
- James Cybulski (2009–2011)
- Darren Dutchyshen (1995–2024)
- James Duthie
- Leah Hextall
- Holly Horton (2004–2011)
- Mark Jones
- Suneel Joshi
- Teresa Kruze (1986–2000)
- John Gallagher (1998–2001)
- Farhan Lalji (1997–2000)
- Terry Leibel (1984–1986)
- Michael Landsberg (1984–1997)
- Diana McDonald (1984–1988)
- Gord Miller
- Bryan Mudryk
- Dan O'Toole (2003–2013, 2017–2021)
- Dan Pollard
- David Pratt (1997–2000)
- Blake Price (2001–2004, 2006, 2014–2021)
- Dave Randorf
- Paul Romanuk
- Chris Sedens (1991–1994)
- Natasha Staniszewski (2011–2021)
- Vic Rauter
- Gino Reda (1988–2001)
- Derek Taylor (2014–2019)
- Mike Toth (1997–1998)
- Jim Van Horne (1984–2001)
- Peter Watts
- John Wells (1984–1992)
- Cory Woron (2000–2024)
