= Fox Sports Live =

- The logo during the second run of the show.
- Genre: Sports news
- Presented by: Jay Onrait; Dan O'Toole
- Country of origin: United States
- Original language: English
- No. of seasons: 3

Production
- Executive producer: Michael Hughes
- Production locations: Fox Network Center (Fox Studio Lot Building 101), 10201 W Pico Blvd, Century City, Los Angeles, California
- Camera setup: Multi-camera
- Running time: 30 minutes
- Production company: Fox Sports

Original release
- Network: Fox Sports 1
- Release: August 17, 2013 – February 5, 2016
- Release: February 22, 2016 – February 23, 2017

Fox Sports Live is an American sports news program that aired on Fox Sports 1. It was hosted by Canadian sportscasters Jay Onrait and Dan O'Toole, who had been well known locally for their late-night editions of TSN's SportsCentre.

The program was initially formatted as the channel's sportscast of record, in a similar manner to ESPN's SportsCenter, featuring highlights and analysis of the day's major sporting events and previews of upcoming events, as well as panel discussions, and other, sometimes-comedic segments.

After low viewership and a realignment of FS1's editorial operations towards personality and opinion-based programs, the program was retooled in February 2016 as Fox Sports Live with Jay and Dan. It adopted a late-night talk show-styled format, with a larger focus on comedy segments and interviews than straight sports news. Fox Sports Live was cancelled on February 23, 2017, with Jay and Dan subsequently returning to TSN to host a revival of their previous show.

== Overview and format ==
The first editions of Fox Sports Live aired most evenings starting at either 10:30 or 11:00 p.m. – depending on when a scheduled sporting event on FS1 concludes – and running until 2:00 a.m. Eastern Time. On some nights, the program would begin at 9:30 p.m. Eastern or earlier (such as on February 14, 2015, the Saturday before the 2015 Daytona 500, when a special daytime edition of FSL titled "Drive to the 500" aired at 2:00 p.m. Eastern Time). From the program's inception until July 2015, Fox Sports 1 aired short 90-second capsules known as the Fox Sports Live Update at various times in-between commercial breaks; these update segments were alternately branded as America's Pregame Update (titled after the sports preview show America's Pregame, which itself was cancelled by the network in September 2015) – providing updates of certain stories or reports on headlines that broke since the previous night's initial Fox Sports Live broadcast – during updates aired on weekdays between 8:00 a.m. and 6:00 p.m. Eastern.

Until the end of the first run after Super Bowl 50, the program was primarily anchored by Jay Onrait and Dan O'Toole on Tuesday through Saturday evenings, and by Ryan Field on Sundays and Mondays. The program also featured a panel of rotating talent with Charissa Thompson serving as moderator and segment host, helming a standalone show at 12:00 a.m. Eastern Time, Fox Sports Live: Countdown, on nights when FS1 is not airing a major sports event (during the college football season, the Friday edition of Countdown was known as Fox Sports Live: Countdown to Kickoff).

The program often leads each broadcast with different, and sometimes more expansive, event coverage than SportsCenter – in particular, during the 2014 postseason, the program maintained a larger focus on Major League Baseball coverage, roughly double the amount covered by SportsCenter. Fox Sports executive vice president Scott Ackerson noted that the program bases what it leads each edition with on "the biggest, most important story there is" on that day, with editions leading out of an event tending to skew coverage toward the sport that was broadcast beforehand.

During broadcasts anchored by Onrait and O'Toole, FSL aired short segments under the Fox Sports 1 Sneak Peek title, which feature either behind-the-scenes featurettes or comedic spots such as the "FSL Thrill Cam" (with the two stating that the pieces were crafted as an homage to the comedy skits featured on Late Night with David Letterman). The channel provided a more detailed news ticker during Fox Sports Live broadcasts, incorporating a panel on the right side of the screen that displayed additional statistics pertaining to the teams discussed in the highlight or topical discussion segment being shown and a sidebar which resembled that seen on SportsCenter (with the cosmetic difference being that FSL's sidebar was placed on the right side of the screen, whereas SportsCenter's sidebar is placed at the left). Off-the-collar segments were also featured on nights in which Onrait and O'Toole anchor, such as "Are They Related?" (comparing the resemblance of an athlete with another celebrity or fictional character) and "Check the Tweeter" (featuring Twitter posts from sports luminaries). Most of the lighter moments during the program occurred during the segments "Get Me that Stat!" (featuring player and team statistics) and "The 1" (which focuses on the top play of the day).

== History ==
=== Development ===
On March 5, 2013, as part of Fox Sports Media Group's announcement of Fox Sports 1's launch (replacing the motorsports-focused Speed), the division announced that it would launch Fox Sports Live as a daily sports news and analysis program that would compete directly opposite with ESPN's longer-established sports news program, SportsCenter (which maintains a more straightforward news, analysis and features format). Fox Sports executives later stated that the program would be treated in the form of multiple shows incorporated within a single three-hour block. Initial plans for the program called for Fox Sports Live to expand to include a morning edition (with New York City being considered to serve as the production base for the proposed broadcast) in January 2014, which ultimately did not launch at that time. Fox Sports previously had attempted national sports news programs (which focused more on highlights than analysis) on its Fox Sports Net slate of regional networks, beginning with the 1996 premiere of Fox Sports News, which in 2000, evolved into the National Sports Report; six years after the cancellation of that program, FSN Final Score premiered on the regional networks in 2006, lasting for three years.

On May 6, 2013, Fox Sports named Jay Onrait and Dan O'Toole as the program's main anchors; the two came to FS1 from TSN, a Canadian sports channel minority-owned by ESPN, where the pair gained popularity for their irreverent presentation of sports news while serving as anchors of the late-night editions of its version of SportsCenter. O'Toole stated in an interview with the sports website The Big Lead that the two gave a directive to Fox Sports Live's writing staff to avoid giving away the highlight within the program's headline segments, in order to use game highlight to help expand upon the story, saying "It's not just highlights, we want to make it into an actual show and try to develop that 'show within a show world.'" In turn, Fox Sports executives gave Onrait and O'Toole free rein to maintain the humorous, lighthearted approach that made them well known in their home country during their SportsCentre tenure.

Two weeks later on May 23, former tennis player Andy Roddick was announced to become a contributor for Fox Sports Live, joining host Charissa Thompson (who rejoined Fox Sports, where she previously served as an NFL sideline reporter and co-host of Fox Sports Net's The Best Damn Sports Show Period, after a four-year run as host of ESPN2's SportsNation) as part of a panel feature discussing the day's sports headlines that would also incorporate interview segments. Then on July 25, Fox Sports announced that former NBA player Gary Payton and former NFL players Donovan McNabb and Ephraim Salaam would be added as contributors; Don Bell and Ryan Field were named anchors of the Sunday and Monday editions as well as breaking news anchors for the daytime Fox Sports Live Updates, while Molly McGrath and Julie Stewart-Binks were also named as contributors to the program.

=== Launch ===
The program premiered on August 17, 2013, the date of FS1's launch, following the conclusion of its first UFC Fight Night telecast (featuring a main event card between Maurício Rua and Chael Sonnen). The extended 67-minute premiere telecast averaged 476,000 viewers and registered an overnight rating of 0.3 (only three-tenths of a point below the 0.6 earned by that night's 11:00 p.m. edition of SportsCenter).

Reviews for the program were mixed (many comments of which in print reviews and on social media complimented Onrait and O'Toole's presentation); Awful Announcing's Joe DeLessio and USA Today's Chris Chase noted similarities to SportsCenter's format, with DeLessio adding that Fox Sports Live "[added] a layer to [the sports news format] by having the same panel on the show every night and throwing to it regularly", while Time columnist Sean Gregory stated the production quality had "the Fox Sports feel." Others noted issues with the chemistry of the contributors to the "Fox Sports Panel" segment. Boston Globe columnist Saul Austerlitz stated that although he felt the program was "often amusing", it felt "strained because of its efforts to differentiate itself from [...] SportsCenter". Within a few months of its debut, the format of Fox Sports Live shifted more toward a focus on game highlights and less on panel discussions.

Since its premiere, viewership for the 11:00 p.m. broadcast has fluctuated wildly on most nights when the program did not have the help of a strong event lead-in. With declines experienced during its first week (including a 0.0 overnight rating it registered for the August 19 edition), the August 20 edition registered the program's lowest audience up to that point with 61,000 viewers (along with an additional 6,000 viewers on average with simulcasts on many of the Fox Sports regional networks factored in); overall during the period from August 19 to 26, Fox Sports Live averaged 61,451 viewers (compared to the 1,002,588 that SportsCenter averaged during that week). The program saw its highest ratings (to date as of January 2014) on November 10, 2013, when the program averaged 161,000 viewers after FS1's telecast of the Camping World Truck Series Lucas Oil 150 race. Its morning rebroadcast also registered the network's highest ratings in the Sunday 10:00 a.m. Eastern timeslot, with 132,000 viewers on average during the fourth quarter of 2013. Fox Sports Live's highest ratings to date occurred in October 2014, on nights when it had college football and National League Championship Series games as lead-ins, with an average of 353,000 viewers. On October 16, the program earned a single-day ratings high of 2.3 million viewers, following Game 5 of the NLCS, beating the previous high of 2.2 million following a February 2014 NASCAR race telecast (the October 20 edition, without a strong lead-in, comparatively was viewed by only 23,000, a 99% decline); overall during that month, Fox Sports Live averaged 1.3 million viewers leading out of postseason baseball coverage, and just 75,000 viewers without any live event lead-ins, with very limited increases on nights when Fox aired coverage of the World Series (despite heavy promotion during the games).

In February 2014, Fox Sports started scaling back its rebroadcasts of Fox Sports Live; as a result, the 3:00 to 6:00 a.m. Eastern repeat block of the program was moved to sister network Fox Sports 2, while FSL repeats on Fox Sports 1 from 5:00 to 10:00 a.m. Eastern Time. On June 26, 2015, Fox Sports announced that it would eliminate the Fox Sports Live Update segments as part of a cost-cutting effort done to restructure Fox Sports 1's news operations and streamline the division's television and digital operations, resulting in the layoffs of some of FS1's news and production personnel. The segments were replaced by video content from Fox Sports Digital's @The Buzzer website. In addition, Fox Sports 1 would scale back on live reports for events to which the network does not hold broadcast rights to air.

=== 2016 retooling ===
On February 22, 2016, Fox Sports Live was re-launched with a revamped format as Fox Sports Live with Jay and Dan; the new format was more akin to a late-night talk show rather than a conventional sports news program, with a larger focus on sports-related comedy and interviews.

The new format opened with "Here's What Happened Today", a monologue-like segment recapping the day's sports headlines, as well as "Jay and Dan's Selected Summation of Today's Athletic Achievements in Sports" (JADSSOTAIS). Other segments may be included in the opening. On some nights, Jay and Dan present "The Producer Tim", the worst play of the day. This leads into a guest for the night (The show also shows the main guest plus two guests that never actually appear on the show, but are provided as comedic relief.).

The show ends with "Video you've Already Seen On Your Phone", a series of viral videos, most comedic, before Jay and Dan unveil "The Greg" (referring to former anchor Greg Wolf), the best play of the day. The one holdover segment that remained was "Ya Blew It", during which Jay and Dan correct their mistakes.

=== Cancellation ===
Fox Sports 1 announced the cancellation of Fox Sports Live on February 23, 2017, with the program's final edition airing the previous night. The duo subsequently returned to TSN in September 2017, hosting a new show called SC with Jay and Dan on that network.

== On-air staff ==
This section lists the program's main hosts and principal panelists (or "opinionists", as termed by Scott Ackerman, executive vice president of Fox Sports), some of whom also served as substitute presenters. In addition, Fox Sports Live also periodically used reporters and commentators from the various Fox Sports regional networks.

Anchors

- Don Bell – Sunday and Monday anchor; also substitute anchor (2013–2015); left in 2015 to become sports director at KYW-TV
- Jay Onrait – Anchor (2013–2017)
- Dan O'Toole – Anchor (2013–2017)
- Charissa Thompson – Monday-Friday host/moderator of Fox Sports Live: Countdown (2013–2015)
- Ryan Field – Saturday and Sunday; also substitute anchor (2013–2016)
- Jenny Taft – Sunday and Monday segment host/moderator; also substitute anchor (2013–2016)
- Greg Wolf – Saturday and Sunday; also substitute anchor (2013–2016)
- Mike Hill – Saturday and Sunday; also substitute anchor (2013–2016)

Opinionists
All were mainly seen Monday through Fridays during the old run. The second run rarely featured the opinionists; however, some of them remained with the network to contribute to the show.

- Eric Karros (2014–present)
- CJ Nitkowski (2014–present)
- Frank Thomas (2014–present)
- Ephraim Salaam (2013–present; seen Monday-Fridays) also on NFL on Fox
- Randy Moss (2013–present; seen mainly on NFL on Fox)
- Joel Klatt (2013–present) also on mainly CFB on Fox
- Brady Quinn (2013–present) also on mainly NFL on Fox and CFB on Fox
- Ronde Barber (2015–present)
- Petros Papadakis – college football analyst and former Fox Sports Live: Countdown panelist (2013–present)
- Clay Travis – college football analyst and former Fox Sports Live: Countdown panelist (2013–present)
- Frank Luntz – "Sound Off" feature contributor (2013–2014)
- Donovan McNabb (2013–2014; suspended by Fox Sports in July 2015 following his arrest on a DUI complaint)
- Gary Payton college basketball analyst and Fox Sports Live: Countdown panelist (2013–2015)

== See also ==
- SportsCenter – a daily sports news program on ESPN, which served as the direct competitor of Fox Sports Live.
- The 'Lights – a daily sports highlight program on NBCSN, that differs from both Fox Sports Live and SportsCenter in its use of voiceovers for presenting highlights in lieu of on-camera anchors.
- Daily sports news programs broadcast on international versions of Fox Sports:
  - Central Fox on Fox Sports Latin America, Fox Sports Brazil and Fox Deportes
  - Fox Sports Central on Fox Sports Southeast Asia and Fox Sports Taiwan
  - Fox Sports Vandaag on Fox Sports Netherlands
