= Western Academy Broadcasting College =

Coordinates: 52.1454°N 106.6681°W

Western Academy Broadcasting College, commonly abbreviated as WABC, is a broadcasting college in Saskatoon, Saskatchewan. The college is known for graduates such as TSN's Darren Dreger and Darren Dutchyshen, as well as Sportsnet's Daren Millard and Peter Loubardias.

== Programs ==
Western Academy Broadcasting College specializes in broadcast training instructed by professional Canadian broadcasters. The main focus of these courses is to develop on-air talent and allow students to showcase their ability and personality. This objective is achieved by individual instruction within small group sessions. Through these sessions, individuals get practice in professional broadcasting studios in a variety of roles: radio personality, commercial announcing and broadcast journalism.

=== Radio training ===
The college offers a voice training program that features a combination of different techniques utilized by successful broadcasters and announcers. Topics covered include microphone techniques, script reading, radio DJ shows, and news and sports broadcasting.

=== Television studio ===
The academy offers an intensive course in television studio production. The program is designed to develop skills and give comprehensive insight into TV studio practices. Students experience hands-on contact with broadcast-calibre TV equipment and are introduced to procedures and ideas currently used by the professional television industry. The training program has a strong emphasis on skills development in utilizing contemporary broadcast TV studio equipment including cameras, switching control boards, graphics character generator and TV audio equipment.

=== Television reporting and editing ===
The academy offers an intensive advanced television training course in using a single camera outside the studio to gather news stories in the real world. It's referred to as ENG (Electronic News Gathering) and EFP (Electronic Field Production). This program is designed to develop skills and give comprehensive insight into video shooting and reporting "on location". Students are introduced to techniques, procedures, and ideas currently used by the professional television industry. The video is then edited and assembled into the finished product. Field Camera Video involves planning the video shots, camera position, sequences, and segments. The Emphasis is on enhancing good visual story development for the viewing audience.
