= Ryan Field (sportscaster) =

American sportscaster

- Born: August 12, 1977
- Education: Michigan State University
- Occupation: Sports anchor for WABC-TV
- Notable credit(s): Fox Sports Detroit; Fox Sports 1

Ryan Field (born August 12, 1977) is an American sportscaster who is currently a sports anchor on WABC-TV's Eyewitness News Weeknight and Saturday Morning Newscasts. He is a native of Troy, Michigan, and a graduate of Michigan State University.

== Career ==
Field's television work began in 1996 as a sports intern at WILX-TV, the NBC affiliate in Lansing.

His broadcasting experience includes serving as a reporter and sports talk show host at WDBM Radio (88.9 FM) in East Lansing, where he was recognized for "Best College Radio Sportscast" in 1999 by the Michigan Association of Broadcasters.

Ryan Field had been a sports reporter at WJBK (Fox 2) in Detroit since August 2000 and provided sports updates on WDFN Radio (1130 AM). At WDFN, he was known for his signature emphasis on the word "guaranteed" during his newsbreaks.

Before joining Fox 2, he was the sports director and previously weekend sports anchor at WSYM (Fox 47) in Lansing.

From September 2003 to June 2013, Field covered the Detroit Tigers, Detroit Pistons, and Detroit Red Wings for Fox Sports Detroit (FSD). Field left FSD to join the launch of Fox Sports 1 in August 2013, where he served as an anchor and studio host, and was seen on several of the channel’s programs including Fox Sports Live, MLB Whiparound, Inside the Big East, and more. Field can also be heard as co-host of a sports talk radio show on Fox Sports Radio each Sunday from 1 p.m. to 4 p.m. ET, along with former NBA player, Jim Jackson.

On October 26, 2016, Field became the weeknight sports anchor for WABC-TV. He currently anchors sports highlights on weeknights at 6 and 11 p.m. and on Saturday mornings.

== Awards and other appearances ==
His work reporting on the local teams was highlighted by capturing a Michigan Emmy in 2006 in the Sports News Feature category for his work following the collapse of Detroit Red Wings defenseman Jiri Fischer, stricken with a heart ailment during a game.

In 2009, Field took home his first Emmy for Best Sports Anchor.

Field now has seven Michigan Emmys to his credit.

Field was once on an episode of The Price is Right.

Field was primary sideline reporter for Fox Sports Detroit’s Pistons game coverage.
