= Rod Smith (sportscaster) =

Canadian sportscaster

- Occupation: Sports commentator
- Known for: SportsCentre, CFL on TSN

Rod Smith is a Canadian sports commentator and host of TSN's SportsCentre. He formerly hosted the CFL on TSN before being replaced by Kate Beirness in 2021. He is currently the lead play-by-play announcer for the CFL on TSN.

== Career ==
Smith has been with TSN since 1987, joining as an editorial assistant for SportsCentre (then SportsDesk). He became a reporter in 1992 and has presented SportsCentre since 1995. He was also a play-by-play announcer for CFL on TSN and CIS University Football.

At the Vancouver 2010 Olympic Winter Games, Smith provided the play-by-play commentary for Long Track Speed Skating. He earned his first Gemini Award nomination in the category of Best Sports Play-by-Play Announcer later that year. During the London 2012 Olympic Summer Games, Smith delivered play-by-play commentary from the Aquatic Centre and was honoured with the first-ever Canadian Screen Award for Best Sports Play-by-Play Announcer in 2013. In 2014, Smith won a Canadian Screen Award for Best Sports Host in a Sports Program or Series for his work on SportsCentre.

After Dave Randorf left as host of the CFL on TSN panel to join Rogers Media, Smith took over as host. Smith returned to providing play-by-play commentary for some CFL games during the 2018 season, mostly for Thursday Night Football. Starting in 2021, Kate Beirness took over as the CFL on TSN studio host, while Smith became the secondary CFL announcer alongside Duane Forde. Upon Rod Black's departure from TSN on October 14, 2021, Smith became the lead CFL on TSN play-by-play announcer. He also called his first Grey Cup as play-by-play man, the 108th game at Tim Hortons Field in Hamilton, Ontario, on December 12, 2021.

== Personal life ==
Smith graduated from Ryerson Polytechnical Institute in Radio and Television Arts, in 1986. Earlier, he had attended Queen's University and was an offensive lineman for the Golden Gaels.
