= Jennifer Hedger =

Canadian television personality

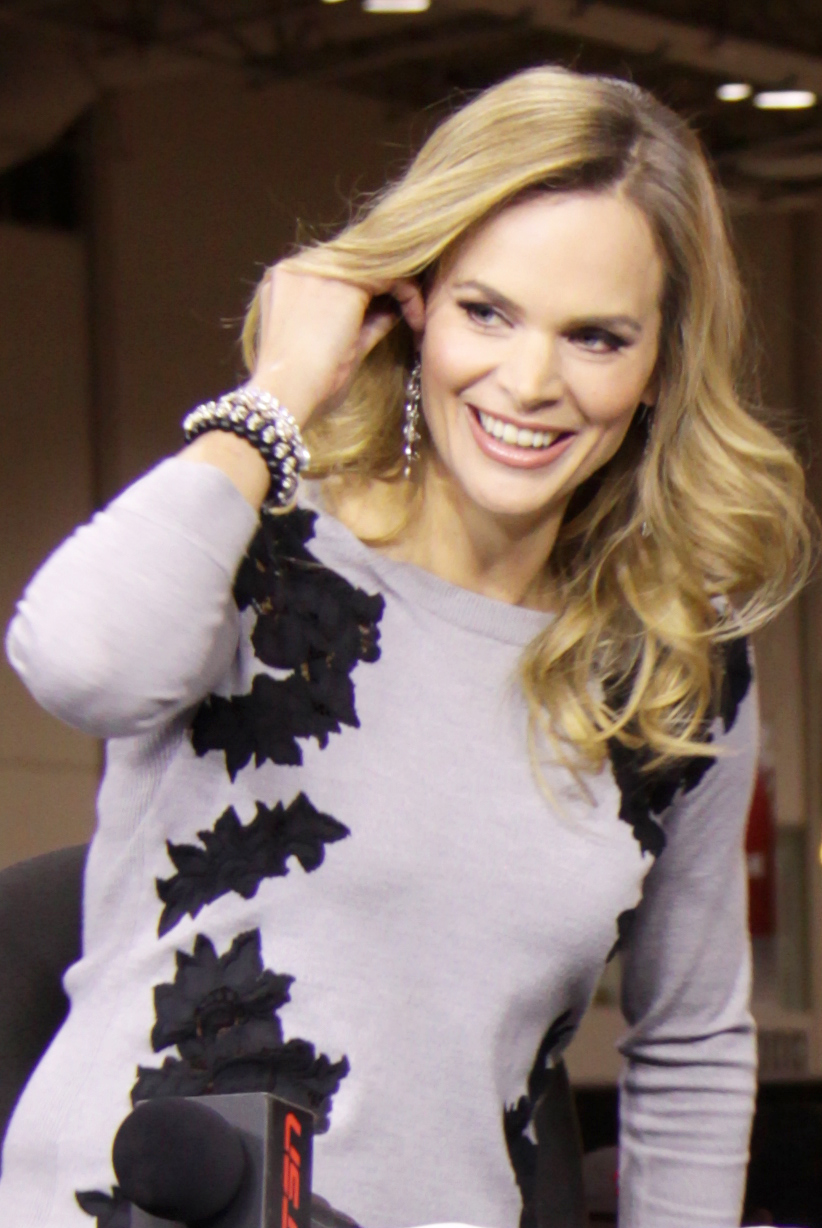
- Hedger working with TSN in 2016
- Born: September 18, 1975 (age 51); London, Ontario
- Occupation: Sports Broadcaster
- Spouse: Sean McCormick
- Children: Jaeger McCormick

Jennifer Frances Hedger (born September 18, 1975 in London, Ontario) is a Canadian television personality and the co-host of TSN's nightly sports news program SportsCentre.

== Broadcasting career ==
Hedger's first on-air experiences were with the London station for Rogers Television where shes regularly contributed to the show Plugged In! and was host of OHL Primetime during the 1998-99 OHL season. In 2001, she was chosen to be a part of U8TV: The Lofters, a Canadian reality show where eight strangers lived together in a Toronto loft while also producing and hosting their own online television shows. After her year in the loft ended, she made appearances on TSN's talk show Off the Record with Michael Landsberg, before joining TSN in 2002 as co-anchor of SportsCentre's 11pm and 2am ET broadcasts.

Hedger is currently the co-host of the 10 p.m. ET edition of SportsCentre. Her regular co-host was Darren Dutchyshen until his death in 2024.

In addition to her TSN duties, Hedger co-hosted Olympic Daytime on CTV alongside James Duthie during the London 2012 Olympic Games, and was the Whistler Host of Olympic Prime Time on CTV for the Vancouver 2010 Olympic Winter Games. She has also had cameo roles in the pilot episode of the TV series Whistler and an episode of Corner Gas, both of which aired on CTV.

Hedger was on maternity leave from TSN from March 2011 to January 2012. Kate Beirness filled in for Hedger, working with Darren Dutchyshen.
