= Marty York =

Canadian sports journalist, columnist, and Jewish activist

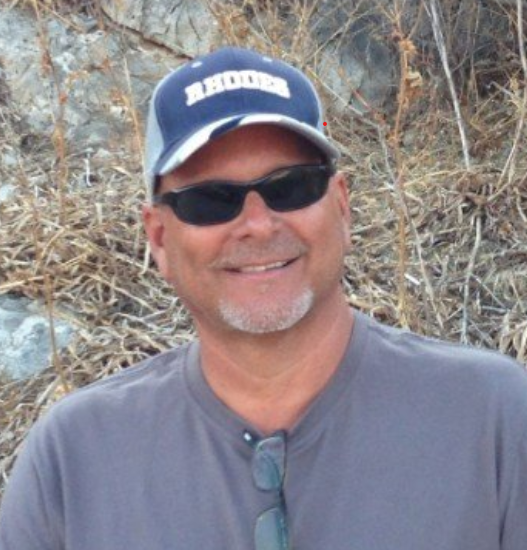
Marty York

Marty York is a Canadian columnist for the National Post, and former sports journalist with The Globe and Mail, TSN, Sportsnet, and Metro newspapers across Canada. He is also the former Director of Communications for B'nai Brith Canada.

== Biography ==
York was born in Toronto and studied political science and history at York University. He began his journalistic career as a young reporter and summer staffer for The Globe and Mail, covering both sports and news during his high school and university days.

=== Career ===
York first wrote for The Globe as a teenager in 1974, after a reporter who visited his class recruited him to write about amateur sports. Not long afterwards, popular Globe sports columnist Dick Beddoes took York under his wing and became his mentor.

After his graduation, then-Globe managing editor Clark Davey hired York full-time for sports coverage and asked him to inject objective and tough reporting into his work.

While on assignment in 1989, York was in the upper deck of San Francisco's Candlestick Park, preparing to cover the World Series between the San Francisco Giants and the Oakland Athletics, when the deadly Loma Prieta earthquake struck. York escaped unscathed but witnessed the horrible aftermath of the tragedy.

York went on the record in 1989 correctly predicting that Cito Gaston would be hired as the Blue Jays permanent manager.

York spent part of his time with the Globe as the paper's Associate Sports Editor.

During and after his decades with the Globe, York emerged as one of the "insiders" in TV sports coverage and worked for both of Canada's leading sports TV networks, TSN and Sportsnet. His segment with Sportsnet was called The York Report, and he broke countless sports stories in that role. He became well known for his signoff on The York Report, which consisted of him pointing a finger at the camera and bidding farewell. York was a member of TSN's original CFL panel.

York professionally covered close to 250 World Series, Stanley Cup, NBA Championship, Super Bowl, and Grey Cup games.

Throughout his career, York has been known as a vocal critic of "homerism," which he defines as reporters showing favoritism or openly cheering for teams they cover rather than reporting objectively.

=== Controversies ===
York broke many major, controversial stories as a reporter and then columnist for The Globe. One such example occurred when he discovered that Toronto Blue Jays star Kelly Gruber was spending time water-skiing and playing tennis in Northern Ontario, while simultaneously missing games on and sitting out on his team's injured list.

In 2015 and 2016, York criticized then-Blue Jays star Jose Bautista for his infamous "bat flip" after a game-winning home run in the 2015 ALDS. He called Bautista a poor sport, accused him of violating the norms of baseball etiquette, and also called him "evil" for his disrespectful treatment of reporter Steve Simmons. York continued to criticize Bautista after Texas Rangers player Rougned Odor punched him in the face the following season, believed by many to be in retaliation for the bat flip incident.

York is active on Twitter and often ruffles the feathers of Toronto fans with provocative commentary on Toronto sports teams. He often predicts losses for Toronto teams in playoff series, or less-productive seasons than reporters that he calls "homers" predict for the teams. He often refers to Sportsnet, for instance, as a "sister media organization" for the Blue Jays because they are both owned by the same company.

York at times reported hostile treatment from athletes, including incidents where he said Blue Jays players threw items such as socks and food at him during team flights. In 1982, his nickname among some CFL fans was "the enemy." In 1993, former Blue Jays' star George Bell reportedly lost his temper when York was questioning him, angrily exclaiming that York should "get the hell over to Saskatchewan or Calgary and cover Canadian football like you're supposed to."

In 1990, York reported that hockey legend Bobby Orr had become a pariah at York University's sports clinic after he stopped supporting their efforts. York claimed that the clinic subsequently wanted nothing to do with Orr.

York sparked another controversy in 2006 when he claimed that Toronto Raptors players were secretly rooting to see their coach, Sam Mitchell, ousted from the job. In recent years, York repeatedly claimed on Twitter that Blue Jays manager John Gibbons would imminently be fired—something he later acknowledged was at least in part meant as a joke.

York has at times been confused by some with the actor of the same name, most famous for the film The Sandlot.

=== Time with B'nai Brith ===
In January, 2016, York was appointed to the dual role of Senior Coordinator of Media and Sports for B'nai Brith Canada, the country's oldest Jewish human-rights organization. He subsequently became Chief Media Officer and Director of Communications for the organization.

Under York and CEO Michael Mostyn, B'nai Brith Canada gained a reputation for issuing frequent press releases revealing detailed findings about people and organizations in Canada tied to antisemitism, discrimination and other societal wrongs.

York created the organization's annual charity golf tournament, in which a slew of well-known athletes often participate. He has continued his involvement in this annual event ever since.

In 2019, during York's time as Director of Communications, B'nai Brith unearthed a series of controversial comments and social media posts made by Hassan Guillet, a parliamentary candidate for the Liberal Party in that year's Canadian federal election. When B'nai Brith went public with its findings, the Liberal Party dropped Guillet as a candidate. The story received considerable national media coverage.

York spoke to the media on B'nai Brith's behalf when the organization successfully advocated for the firing of Ryerson University teaching assistant Ayman Elkasrawy, who was accused of making antisemitic remarks in the classroom.

According to his LinkedIn profile, York left B'nai Brith Canada in 2026. He has since become a contributor to the National Post.

== Personal life ==
York is Jewish and the son of Holocaust survivors. He lives in Thornhill, Ontario. He is the father of two adult sons.

From its inception until the end of his tenure with the organization, York was the chairman or co-chairman of B'nai Brith Canada's annual charity golf tournament in the Toronto area, one of the charity's largest annual fundraisers. The event has emerged as one of the most popular golf tournaments in the Toronto area and has consistently been sold out. Sports celebrities recruited by York for this tournament have included friends of his such as NHL Hall of Famer Marcel Dionne, Canadian Football Hall of Famer Damon Allen, horseracing legend Sandy Hawley, former NHL stars Mike Palmateer, Rick Vaive, Dennis Hull and Dennis Maruk and current NHL star Zach Hyman.

York has indicated that out of the sports he covered, his personal favorite was football, and his second favorite was baseball.
