= CFL on TSN =

Telecasts of the Canadian Football League

- Also known as: CFL Game of the Week (1987–1992); CFL Live (1993–2003); TSN Friday Night Football
- Starring: Kate Beirness; Milt Stegall; Davis Sanchez; Henoc Muamba; Paul LaPolice
- Country of origin: Canada

Production
- Running time: 3 hours

Original release
- Network: TSN (1987–current)
- Release: 1987 – present

The CFL on TSN is TSN's presentation of the Canadian Football League. The Sports Network (TSN) has broadcast CFL games since the 1987 season and has been the exclusive broadcaster of all CFL games (including the playoffs and Grey Cup) since 2008. While the CFL on TSN shows all CFL games, a more entertainment-focused Thursday Night Football telecast (unrelated to the National Football League package of the same name) was added in 2015.

== Commentators ==
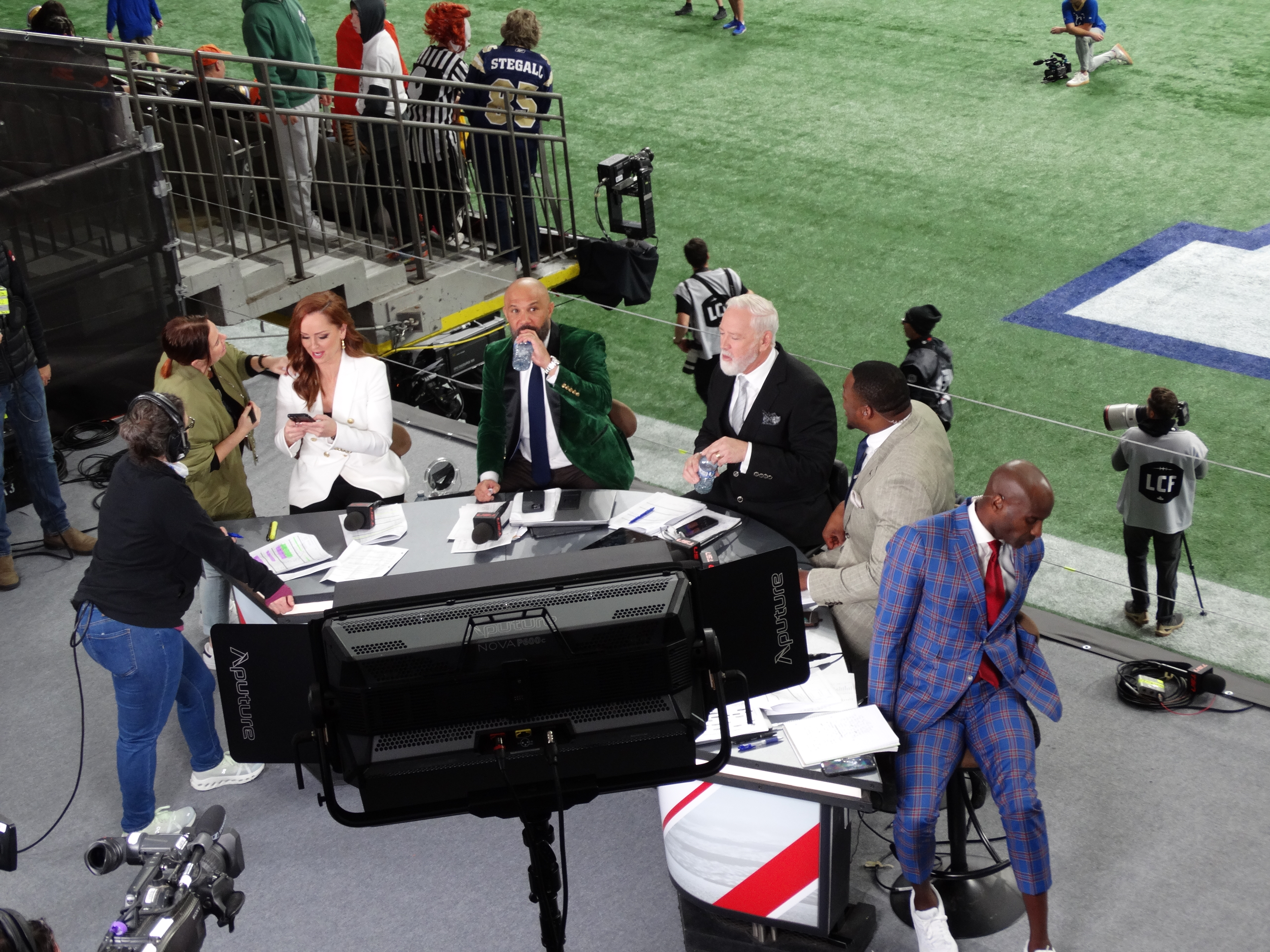
The TSN panel at the 111th Grey Cup game.

=== Studio panel ===
The CFL on TSN's studio panel consists of host Kate Beirness and a rotating crew of former CFL all-star players Milt Stegall, Davis Sanchez, Henoc Muamba, and former CFL coach Jim Barker. Former CFL on CBC studio host Brian Williams occasionally contributed to the studio show also.

TSN first used a studio panel in 1996. It featured Less Browne, Bob O'Billovich, and Marty York alongside host Darren Dutchyshen. Rod Smith replaced Dutchyshen for the 1997 season, with all three analysts returning.

TSN replaced the entire panel for the 1998 season, with network newcomer James Duthie hosting and Chris Schultz and Eric Tillman providing analysis. Tillman became general manager of the Toronto Argonauts in 1999 and was replaced by former CFL quarterback Matt Dunigan. Tillman was fired after one season in Toronto and returned to the panel. In 2001, Dave Randorf took over hosting duties. The following season, slotback Montreal Alouettes Jock Climie retired to become an analyst for TSN. He replaced Tillman, who became the general manager of the expansion Ottawa Renegades. Dunigan left TSN in 2004 to become the head coach and general manager of the Calgary Stampeders. He was fired after a single season and returned to TSN, where he remained until 2024.

Milt Stegall joined TSN as a guest analyst in 2009 after a 14-year playing career in the CFL.

Dave Randorf left TSN for Sportsnet in 2014 and was replaced by Rod Smith.

Henry Burris joined TSN early in the 2017 season as a guest off-screen analyst narrating short explainer films of standard CFL plays using file footage, then joined the studio panel full-time late in 2017. The record-setting retired quarterback was named the league's Most Outstanding Player twice (2010, 2015), won the Grey Cup three times (1998, 2008, 2016), and was named the Grey Cup MVP twice (2008, 2016) during his 19-year CFL career. Burris works as a television host for the local Ottawa version of CTV Morning Live.

Davis Sanchez joined the CFL panel in 2018 after a stint with CKGM sports radio in Montreal commenting on Alouettes games. The 3-time Grey Cup-winning cornerback (2005, 2009, 2011) and three-time East Division defensive All-Star (2000, 2004, 2008) spent 10 seasons in the CFL and 2 in the NFL.

Mike Benevides rejoined the CFL panel in 2019 after being let go from his last coaching role with the Edmonton Eskimos. Benevides was part of the coaching staff of 3 Grey Cup winning teams (2001, 2006, 2011), and was previously a CFL commentator on TSN during the 2015 season.

Beirness took over studio host duties from Rod Smith in 2021.

=== Game commentators ===
John Wells (play-by-play), Leif Pettersen (colour commentary), and Vic Rauter (host) made up TSN's first broadcast team. In 1995, the network added a second broadcast team of Gord Miller (play-by-play) and Glen Suitor (colour). For the 1997 season, David Archer was a third announcer in either the Wells–Pettersen or Miller–Suitor booths on Fridays. During the 1998 season, Pettersen retired to focus on his business commitments and Suitor took over as TSN's lead commentator.

In 2005, Chris Cuthbert joined TSN after he was fired by the CBC and replaced Wells as the lead announcer. Rod Black and Leif Petterson served as the secondary broadcast team, with Wells calling some games that season. 3-time Grey Cup champion Danny McManus replaced Petterson, whose full-time job conflicted with TSN's schedule, in 2007. McManus lasted only one season and was replaced by Duane Forde.

Cuthbert joined Rogers Sportsnet in June 2020 and Rod Black left in October 2021. Since then, TSN has used Rod Smith and Dustin Nielson on play-by-play and Glen Suitor and Duane Forde on commentary.

=== International broadcasts ===
Outside Canada, all games are carried on CFL+, a direct-to-consumer free streaming television platform.

Since 2023, CBS Sports Network (not to be confused with the over-the-air CBS television network) has held exclusive rights to select games in the United States and has prohibited streaming outside of its own TV Everywhere platform.

==== Prior agreements ====
In the early 1990s, Prime Network simulcast TSN's coverage.

In 2008, Friday night games were shown on the World Sport channel of Voom HD. However, in January 2009, Cablevision shut down Voom HD. America One held the rights to other TSN and (prior to 2008) CBC simulcasts through the 2009 season; America One syndicated its games to various regional sports networks across the United States. After that agreement ended, the CFL secured one-year limited broadcast deals with NFL Network (2010–11) and NBC Sports Network (2012–13).

ESPN3, the online arm of ESPN Inc., carried most CFL games from 2008 through 2017; beginning in 2018, live broadcasts moved behind a paywall to ESPN+, ESPN's subscription over-the-top service, with ESPN3 continuing to offer replays of games originally carried on one of ESPN's linear networks.

As part of the 2013 contract extension, which included both U.S. and Canadian broadcast rights, ESPN's terrestrial networks (particularly ESPN2) have carried TSN's coverage of select CFL games on U.S. television. Since 2017, the broadcast schedule began on opening weekend, when most (if not all) of the 4 games would be aired on traditional cable. After that, about one game (usually on a Thursday or Friday Night) every week would also air on cable, though ESPN has not arranged a specific/consistent timeslot for when that game would occur. This lasts throughout the summer, up until the start of the NCAA College Football season in late August/early September, when nearly all of the games move exclusively to ESPN+. This lasted until the start of the playoffs, when the broadcasts returned to cable (playoff games were divided between ESPN2 and ESPNews, and the Grey Cup was placed ESPN2 from 2014 to 2022). In total, around 20 games were carried throughout the season on the ESPN networks, with the other 65 airing on ESPN+. The CBS Sports Network package follows a nearly identical pattern to that followed by ESPN.

The TSN deal also allows for CFL games to be simulcast on ESPN's other international networks, as well as through BT Sport, ESPN's licensing partner in the British Isles.

== Personalities ==
=== Play-by-play ===
- John Wells: 1987–2004 (lead play-by-play announcer), 2005 (secondary play-by-play announcer)
- Chris Cuthbert: 2005–2019 (lead play-by-play announcer)
- Gord Miller: 1991–1998, 2008–2019 (secondary play-by-play announcer)
- Rod Smith: 1998–1999, 2011–2019 (secondary play-by-play announcer), 2021–present (lead play-by-play announcer)
- Dave Randorf: 1999–2000 (secondary play-by-play announcer)
- Rod Black: 2002–2021 (secondary play-by-play announcer)
- Matt Devlin: 2012–2017 (secondary play-by-play announcer)
- Farhan Lalji : 2011–present (secondary play-by-play announcer)
- Dustin Nielson: 2019–present (secondary play-by-play announcer)
- Marshall Ferguson 2021-present (secondary play-by-play announcer)

=== Colour commentator ===
- Leif Pettersen: 1987–1998 (lead colour commentator), 2005–2006 (secondary colour commentator)
- Dan Ferrone: 1993 (secondary colour commentator)
- Glen Suitor: 1995–1998 (secondary colour commentator), 1998–present (lead colour commentator)
- David Archer: 1997
- Matt Dunigan: 1999, 2008–2024 (secondary colour commentator)
- Danny McManus: 2007 (secondary colour commentator)
- Duane Forde: 2008–present (secondary colour commentator)
- Paul LaPolice: 2023–present (secondary colour commentator)
- Luke Willson: 2026–present (secondary colour commentator)

=== Studio hosts ===
- Vic Rauter: 1987–1988
- Peter Watts: 1989–1990
- Gord Miller: 1991–1994
- Darren Dutchyshen: 1995–1996
- Rod Smith: 1997, 2014–2019
- James Duthie: 1998–2000
- Dave Randorf: 2001–2013
- Kate Beirness: 2018–present

=== Studio analysts ===
- Bob O'Billovich: 1996–1997
- Less Browne: 1996–1997
- Marty York: 1996–1997
- Chris Schultz: 1998–2017
- Eric Tillman: 1998, 2000–2001
- Matt Dunigan: 1999–2003, 2005–2024
- Jock Climie: 2002–2018
- Milt Stegall: 2009–present
- Paul LaPolice: 2013–2015, 2023–present
- Mike Benevides: 2015, 2019
- Henry Burris: 2017–2019
- Davis Sanchez: 2018–present
- Henoc Muamba: 2024–present
- Luke Willson: 2025–present
