= That's Hockey =

- Starring: Gino Reda
- Country of origin: Canada

Production
- Running time: varies; usually 30 minutes

Original release
- Network: TSN
- Release: October 1995 – present

Related
- TSN Hockey

That's Hockey 2Day
- Genre: Talk, sports
- Running time: 12-1 PM (Eastern)
- Country of origin: Canada
- Language: English
- Home station: TSN Radio 1050
- TV adaptations: That's Hockey 2Night
- Original release: April 13, 2011

That's Hockey (currently known as Domino's That's Hockey for sponsorship reasons) is a Canadian television series on TSN which presents the latest news in hockey as well as panelists and interviews with hockey personalities. The current host is Gino Reda. The opening and closing theme song was composed by Canadian musicians Andy Curran and Greg Godovitz.

== History ==
The show debuted in October 1995 with Dave Hodge as host. It replaced TSN Inside Sports, which Hodge also hosted. Gord Miller hosted the show from 1998 to 2002. The show got its name from former TSN broadcaster Jim Hughson exclaiming "That's Hockey!" during exciting plays.

On October 8, 2014, TSN announced that Tim Hortons would become title sponsor of the program. Molson was the former sponsor. In 2018, 7-Eleven became title sponsor.

== Format ==
The show aired at 7:00pm ET on nights when TSN isn't airing live sports coverage in that time slot and now airs during sportscenter. If TSN is airing a hockey game at 7:00, they usually air the spin-off show That's Hockey 2Nite following the game at 9:30pm ET on the main network. An NHL on TSN analyst will join Reda for the program on most nights. These analysts include Darren Dreger, Bob McKenzie, Ray Ferraro, and Keith Jones, among others.

=== That's Hockey: The Playoff Edition ===
During the playoffs That's Hockey: Playoff Edition airs instead. Times of this show will vary because of TSN's Stanley Cup Playoff coverage. Otherwise the show is the same as the regular season version. During the Stanley Cup Finals TSN, airs That's Hockey: Stanley Cup Final Edition. On game nights this will air for a full hour. Gino is joined by three or four NHL on TSN analysts. These include Darren Dreger, Bob McKenzie and Pierre McGuire.

== Spin Offs ==
=== That's Hockey 2Nite ===
The aforementioned spin-off, That's Hockey 2Nite debuted February 1, 2011 on TSN2. The show was hosted by Steve Kouleas until 2014. The show ends with a segment called "Who Won the Night?". Glenn Schiiler was the last host. The 2016-17 NHL season marked the end of the show, getting replaced by SC with Jay and Dan.

=== That's Hockey 2Day ===
The hosts also hosted a noon to 1pm show called That's Hockey 2 Day.
