= Motoring (TV series) =

- Genre: Automotive newsmagazine
- Presented by: Brad Diamond, Jim Kenzie, Graeme Fletcher, David Menzies, Ted Laturnus, Bill Gardiner, Howard Elmer, David Booth, Zack Spencer
- Narrated by: Phil Godin
- Theme music composer: Steve Shelski
- No. of seasons: 31

Production
- Producer: Brad Diamond
- Production location: Woodbine Racetrack
- Editor: Paul D. Piche
- Running time: 30 minutes
- Production company: Bradford Productions

Original release
- Network: TSN

Motoring (usually appended with the current model year, such as Motoring 2015; sometimes stylized as Motoring TV) is a Canadian television automotive newsmagazine, broadcast by TSN and produced by Bradford Productions. Its debut was in 1987 on TSN as Motoring 88 in a 1/2 hour timeslot. Its motto is, "bringing you stories about cars and the people who drive them."

== Synopsis ==
The program provides reviews and features about new automotive vehicles, including results of test drives. There are also tips about auto mechanics.

== History ==
Motoring TV premiered on TSN: The Sports Network in the fall of 1987 as Motoring '88 in a 1/2-hour timeslot.

In 2013, Motoring won the Best Video Journalism for Television Broadcast award.

Show series is now off the air with "Motoring 22" as the final season.

== See also ==
- MotorWeek
- Fifth Gear
- Top Gear
- The Grand Tour
