= Darren Dutchyshen =

Canadian sportscaster (1966–2024)

- Born: Darren John Dutchyshen; December 19, 1966; Regina, Saskatchewan, Canada
- Died: May 15, 2024 (aged 57); Toronto, Ontario, Canada
- Occupation: Sports broadcaster
- Known for: TSN, SportsCentre
- Partner: Kate Beirness
- Children: 3

Darren John Dutchyshen (December 19, 1966 – May 15, 2024) was a Canadian sportscaster who co-hosted the evening edition of SportsCentre on TSN.

== Broadcasting career ==
Dutchyshen started his broadcasting career as a sportscaster at STV Saskatoon (now that city's Global station). After a year, he moved to IMTV in Dauphin, Manitoba. He then spent seven years in Edmonton, hosting Sports Night on ITV (also now a Global station), and for more than two years concurrently hosting a daily radio sportscast on co-owned 630 CHED.

Dutchyshen joined TSN in 1995 and became a host of TSN's coverage of the Canadian Football League (CFL) during the football season and TSN's weekend editions of SportsDesk (TSN's flagship news programme, later re-named SportsCentre in 2001). He became a mainstay at TSN's daily sportscasts over the following three decades, often hosting evening or late night editions of SportsCentre alongside Rod Smith or Jennifer Hedger. He was the host of TSN's Olympic Prime Time coverage during the 2010 Winter Olympics and 2012 Summer Olympics. He was also the co-host with Canadian trainer and cutman Russ Anber in the boxing programme In This Corner.

== Personal life and death ==
Dutchyshen was born on December 19, 1966, in Regina, Saskatchewan to John and Betty (née Godlien) Dutchyshen and grew up in the northeastern town of Porcupine Plain. He graduated from the Saskatoon-based Western Academy Broadcasting College (WABC).

On September 9, 2021, he announced that he had prostate cancer, and detailed it in full a year later in his first show back at SportsCentre. Dutchyshen died on May 15, 2024, at the age of 57. According to a family statement, he was "surrounded by his closest loved ones". Following his death, some media outlets noted that Dutchyshen had quietly been in a long-term relationship with fellow TSN sportscaster Kate Beirness and had three children from a previous marriage.
