= Dan O'Toole =

Canadian TV sports anchor (born 1975)

- Born: September 10, 1975 (age 51); Peterborough, Ontario, Canada
- Other names: Toolsie, Old Man Toolsie, Daniel Gerard O'Toole
- Occupation: Sports anchor
- Known for: SportsCentre, Fox Sports Live, SC with Jay and Dan, The Jay and Dan Podcast

Daniel Gerard O'Toole (born September 10, 1975) is a former Canadian television sports anchor who was last employed by TSN. From 2003 to 2013 and 2017 to February 2021, he co-hosted the 1:00 AM (ET) weekday broadcast of TSN's SportsCentre, alongside Jay Onrait.

In May 2013, O'Toole and Onrait revealed they would be leaving TSN and Canada at the end of June to work as co-anchors on the newly created Fox Sports 1 channel based in Los Angeles. He began working for Fox Sports 1 in August 2013 after he and Onrait hosted their final show on TSN on June 28, 2013. After their Fox show was cancelled in 2017, the duo returned to TSN where they hosted SC with Jay and Dan until February 4, 2021.

== Early life ==
O'Toole grew up on a farm in the rural community of Keene, Ontario and attended St. Peter's Secondary School in nearby Peterborough, Ontario.^{[n1]}

== Broadcasting career ==
O’Toole’s broadcasting career began at Algonquin College where he did play-by-play for the Ottawa 67's. Following his graduation, O’Toole moved to Vancouver in 1997 where he reported on traffic from a four-seater plane for CJJR-FM and CFUN-AM. He moved to Fort McMurray, Alberta in 1998 where he worked as a sports director for CJOK-FM and CKYX-FM for three years. While there, O'Toole called play-by-play for the Fort McMurray Oil Barons of the AJHL. In 2000, O’Toole began working at CTV Edmonton as the Fort McMurray news reporter in the evenings, while continuing to work as the radio sports director in the morning.

From 2003 to June 28, 2013, O'Toole co-hosted the 1:00 AM (ET) weekday broadcast of SportsCentre alongside Jay Onrait. As host of SportsCentre, he brought viewers a complete summary of the day's sports events, including highlights and post-game reports. During his time at TSN, O'Toole routinely travelled to communities across Canada co-hosting SportsCentre with Onrait as part of the annual summer TSN and Kraft Celebration Tour.

O'Toole was alongside Cory Woron hosting SportsCentre International Broadcast Centre for the Vancouver 2010 Olympic Winter Games.

On May 3, 2013, TSN announced that O'Toole and his broadcast partner Jay Onrait would be leaving SportsCentre for "broadcast opportunities on U.S. television [in Los Angeles, but] will continue hosting SportsCentre until late June 2013. The two confirmed the revelation on their weekly podcast and announced they would be working as co-anchors for the newly created Fox Sports 1 channel based in Los Angeles. They cited a promising opportunity to revive the sports highlights culture in American broadcasting as one of the key factors in their decision to leave TSN.

In February 2016, during the week of Super Bowl 50, O'Toole was unusually harsh and biting toward his employers at Fox Sports 1. He sent several tweets toward people who were the subject of a Deadspin news article. The tweets may have been attributed to the recent layoffs and budget cuts at Fox Sports Live. On February 23, 2017, Fox Sports Live was cancelled and the two hosts' contracts were not renewed. On March 1, 2017, during NHL trade deadline coverage, TSN announced it had re-signed both Onrait and O'Toole in their previous roles at the network, hosting SC with Jay and Dan at 12:00 am EST.

On February 2, 2021, as part of a wave of cuts at Bell Media, O'Toole was let go from TSN, broadcasting his last show with Onrait on February 4, 2021. A few days later, O'Toole sent a series of tweets questioning and criticizing Bell's motives behind their mental health campaigns.

== Podcasts ==
Following the 2012 Summer Olympics where O'Toole was presenting daily SportsCentre highlights from Trafalgar Square with Onrait, O'Toole and Onrait took their television personas and unique brand of humour to the sound booth and began a weekly podcast. The "Jay and Dan Podcast" soon became one of the most successful podcasts in Canada. Along with discussing O'Toole's childhood, current events, TV commercials, and vintage television show themes, the duo played host to a variety of guests.

When Onrait and O'Toole returned to TSN in 2017, the podcast returned as well with Coors Light as the sponsor.

In January 2022, O'Toole launched a solo podcast, Boomsies!, in partnership with BetRivers.

== Family ==
O'Toole has two daughters, Ruby and Sydney, with his ex-wife Corrie.

O'Toole announced the birth of his third daughter, Oakland, on May 26, 2020.

On July 2, 2020, O'Toole announced on Twitter and his Instagram page that his one-month-old daughter Oakland was missing, but that he believed her to be alive. Hours later, he posted that Oakland had been located. According to a Durham Regional Police police contact, there was never any abduction and crime. O'Toole has since deleted all of his Twitter and Instagram posts which pertain to this matter.

He is the cousin of Canadian politician Erin O’Toole.

== Notes ==
1. Tweeted on Dan O'Toole's official Twitter page (https://twitter.com/dangotoole)
