= Jay Onrait =

Canadian sportscaster and TV personality

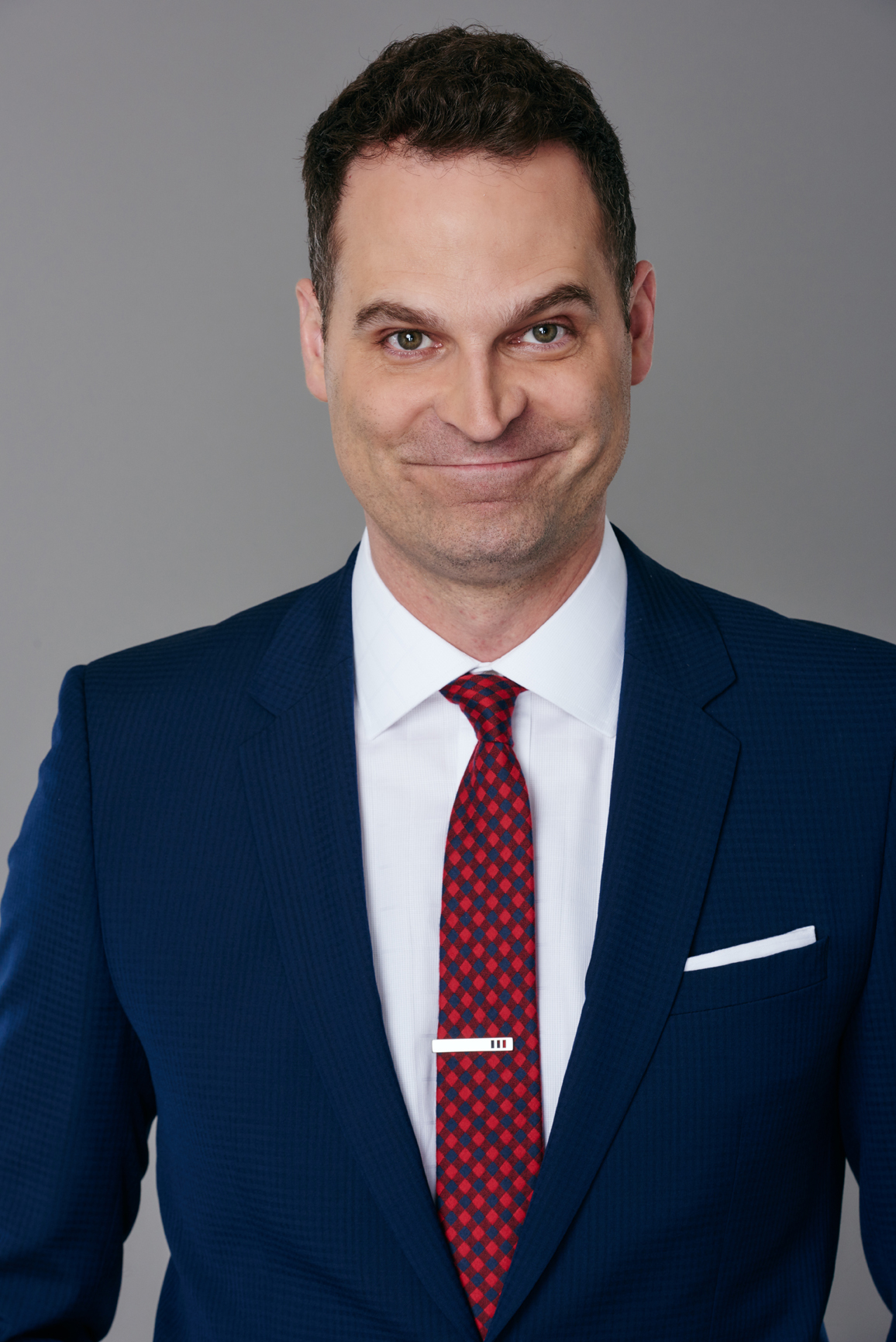
- Onrait with SportsCentre
- Born: August 29, 1974 (age 52); Calgary, Alberta, Canada
- Occupations: Sports anchor and author
- Known for: SportsCentre, Fox Sports Live, The Jay and Dan Podcast, and writing the books Anchorboy and Number Two
- Height: 198 cm (6 ft 6 in)
- Spouse(s): Darcy Modin (div. 2002) Chobi Liang (m. 2013)

Jay Michael Onrait (born August 29, 1974) is a Canadian television personality and sports anchor who hosts SC with Jay Onrait on TSN. From 2003 to 2021, he was frequently paired with fellow Canadian broadcaster Dan O'Toole.

In his first stint with TSN, he and O'Toole co-anchored the daily 1:00 am (ET) edition of SportsCentre and were regarded as the lead anchor team for the network. Onrait was hired by the US sports network FS1 to be its lead co-anchor in 2013, and his final SportsCentre broadcast for TSN aired June 28, 2013. His final Fox Sports 1 show aired February 22, 2017. It was announced that Onrait and O'Toole would be returning to TSN to host a new show, SC with Jay and Dan, on March 1, 2017.

== Career ==
Onrait first joined TSN in 1996 as an editorial assistant while attending Ryerson Polytechnic University. He later went on to become sports director at CFSK-TV in Saskatoon and then spent two years as the host of The Big Breakfast on the A-Channel in Winnipeg. Onrait then joined NHL Network in 2001 as host of both the network's flagship show NHL on the Fly and Molson That's Hockey 2. He moved to TSN in 2002 and in 2003 began co-hosting SportsCentre alongside Dan O'Toole. In 2006, Onrait began blogging at TSN.ca. Topics have included the Stanley Cup and the NBA, as well as an all-day blog about the NHL trade deadline. His blogs are usually spiced with references to pop culture. In October 2010 he also became the host of the Sportscentre Morning Rush on TSN2 until it was taken off the air in October 2011.

During the 2010 Winter Olympics in Vancouver Onrait served as co-host of Olympic Morning alongside Beverly Thomson. During the 2012 Summer Olympics in London Onrait co-hosted daily live editions of SportsCentre from London alongside O'Toole.

On May 3, 2013, TSN announced that Onrait and his broadcast partner Dan O'Toole would be leaving SportsCentre for broadcast opportunities on U.S. television at the newly formed Fox Sports 1 in Los Angeles. They continued to host SportsCentre until June 28, 2013.

Fox Sports Live debuted on August 17, 2013, with Onrait and O'Toole as hosts and aired its final episode on February 22, 2017, when the show was canceled and the two broadcasters' contracts were not renewed.

On March 1, 2017, TSN announced that Onrait and Dan O'Toole would be returning to Canada to host a new show SC with Jay and Dan, which would premiere in Fall of 2017. Its first episode aired September 4, 2017, at 12:00 am EST.

== Podcast ==
When Onrait and O'Toole returned to TSN in 2017, the podcast returned as well with Coors Light as the sponsor. In 2019, Coors announced it would shift its advertising focus to the duo's SportsCentre show, which was later succeeded by McDonald's.

After O’Toole was laid off by TSN in 2021, Onrait announced the podcast would be on an "extended hiatus". The final four episodes were dedicated to O’Toole.

== Personal life ==
Onrait was raised in Boyle, Alberta and Athabasca, Alberta. His father was a pharmacist in Athabasca, and Onrait held jobs at the pharmacy growing up.

When Onrait graduated from Edwin Parr Composite School in 1992, he was given a $250 graduation award for physical education from the Royal Canadian Legion’s Athabasca branch, despite not taking any athletic classes in his final year of high school. In 2018, Onrait gave the Athabasca Legion a $251 refund at a fundraiser dinner for the Athabasca Regional Multiplex.

Onrait has released two books. Anchorboy, which doubles as his autobiography, was released on October 1, 2013. Number Two: More Short Tales from a Very Tall Man followed on October 27, 2015. Both were Canadian bestsellers and released in paperback in November 2016.

Since 2011, Onrait has compiled a best albums year-end list with TSN sports personality Dave Hodge.

Onrait married Chobi Liang, a former TSN publicist, in October 2013, after splitting with Darcy Modin in 2002.

== Filmography ==
Film
Year	Title	Role	Notes
2014	Corner Gas: The Movie	Denizen Jay	

Television
Year	Title	Role	Notes
2003–2013	SportsCentre	Himself/co-anchor	
2010	Olympic Morning	Himself/co-host	2010 Winter Olympics
2013	But I'm Chris Jericho!		Season 1 episode 1: "Sausage & Eggs"
2015	Weird Loners	Himself	Episode 3: "Weirded Out"
2013–2017	Fox Sports Live	Himself/co-host	
2020	Corner Gas Animated	Kyle	Season 3 episode 7: "Give Pizza Chants"
2017–2019	Letterkenny	Himself	2 episodes
2017–2021	SC with Jay and Dan	Himself/co-host/Anchor	
2021–present	SC with Jay Onrait	Himself/host/Anchor	
2022–present	Shoresy	Himself	10 episodes
2024	The Amazing Race Canada	Himself	Season 10 episode 5: "I Smell Like Carcass"

== Awards ==
Onrait was nominated for a Gemini Award in 2010, and won the award in 2011 for Best Sportscaster for his work on Sportscentre.
