= Global Saskatchewan =

Television system in Saskatchewan

CFRE-DT and CFSK-DT

CFRE-DT: Regina, Saskatchewan; CFSK-DT: Saskatoon, Saskatchewan; Canada
- Channels for CFRE-DT: Digital: 11 (VHF); Virtual: 11
- Channels for CFSK-DT: Digital: 20 (UHF); Virtual: 4
- Branding: CFRE-DT: Global Regina (general); Global News (newscasts); CFSK-DT: Global Saskatoon (general)

Programming
- Affiliations: Global

Ownership
- Owner: Corus Entertainment; (Corus Television Limited Partnership)

History
- First air date: September 6, 1987
- Former call signs: CFRE-DT: CFRE-TV (1987–2011); CFSK-DT: CFSK-TV (1987–2011)
- Former channel number: CFRE-DT: Analog: 11 (VHF, 1987–2011); CFSK-DT: Analog: 4 (VHF, 1987–2011); Digital: 42 (UHF, until 2022)
- Former affiliations: Independent (1987–1997)
- Call sign meaning: CFRE-DT: Regina; CFSK-DT: Saskatoon (city); -or-; Saskatchewan (province)

Technical information
- Licensing authority: CRTC
- ERP: CFRE-DT: 17.3 kW; CFSK-DT: 18 kW
- HAAT: CFRE-DT: 300.0 m (984 ft); CFSK-DT: 195 m (640 ft)
- Transmitter coordinates: CFRE-DT: 50°35′45″N 105°4′10″W; CFSK-DT: 52°10′28″N 106°26′3″W

Links
- Website: CFRE-DT: Global Regina; CFSK-DT: Global Saskatoon

Global Saskatchewan is a pair of television stations in Saskatchewan, Canada, owned and operated by the Global Television Network, a division of Corus Entertainment: CFRE-DT (channel 11) in Regina, branded as Global Regina, and CFSK-DT (channel 4) in Saskatoon, known as Global Saskatoon.

CFRE-DT's studios are located on Hoffer Drive and McDonald Street on the northeast side of Regina, with transmitter near Louis Riel Trail/Highway 11, northwest of the city. CFSK-DT has studios on Robin Crescent on the northwest side of Saskatoon (near the Saskatoon John G. Diefenbaker International Airport) and a transmitter on Agra and Settlers Ridge roads (near Highway 41).

CFRE and CFSK were authorized and built together, signing on September 6, 1987, after a multi-year licensing process that included an unusual ruling by the federal cabinet to remand a decision of the Canadian Radio-television and Telecommunications Commission for reconsideration. The two stations, owned by CanWest, were known as Saskatchewan Television (STV) and had identical non-local programming, with split local news for each city. In 1997, when the CanWest Global System was rebranded to Global Television Network, the STV brand was dropped. The stations air separate three-hour local morning newscasts and 90 minutes of local evening news, which is presented from studios in Winnipeg with a production staff based in Regina.

== Background ==
In 1984, three groups responded to the Canadian Radio-television and Telecommunications Commission's (CRTC) call for applications to bring an additional television service to Saskatchewan. CanWest Capital Corporation, owner of the Global Television Network in Ontario and CKND-TV in Winnipeg, triggered the call with its bid, which proposed a station to be known as SaskWest in the planning phase and as STV on the air. Allarcom Limited, owner of CITV in Edmonton, and Saskatchewan Television Network, a consortium of Harvard Communications (owner of CKCK-TV, locally known as "CKTV") and private stations in Yorkton, Prince Albert, and Swift Current. Their proposals were as follows:

- CanWest proposed separately staffed stations in Regina and Saskatoon, which would each offer local news, alternative entertainment programming, and local drama support much as CanWest had at CKND.
- Allarcom's proposal called for a service to be known as Saskatchewan Independent Television with separate studios in Regina and Saskatoon. The Regina studio would be outfitted for drama production, while news and other local programs were promised.
- Saskatchewan Television Network proposed to make its service available by broadcast transmitters at Regina and Saskatoon and by cable in 50 other provincial communities using the SaskTel fibre optic network. The network would be used to distribute educational programming throughout the province. Within five years, STN pledged to start a local operation in Moose Jaw. STN also proposed a variety of local programs covering arts, country music, and the Saskatchewan legislature.

One of the main problems facing the applicants at the outset was the availability of an additional channel at Regina. STV intended to broadcast on channel 13 in Regina, to be made available by the Canadian Broadcasting Corporation building a new transmitter site at Belle Plaine and consolidating channels used for broadcast in Regina and Moose Jaw, but the federal government cancelled the funding that was to be used to build the facility; the CRTC postponed a hearing for the applications, and the tower project was formally cancelled in early 1985.

Saskatchewan Television Network merged its bid with Allarcom in April 1985. One notable condition of the combined application was that the proposed service would not be available on broadcast TV in Saskatoon, only in Regina. By contrast, SaskWest's application had only changed the proposed channel for Regina, from 13 to 11.

Hearings opened in Regina on June 18, 1985, with the SaskWest bid being presented to the CRTC first. The Harvard–Allarcom bid was modified, in a move that frustrated CanWest chairman Izzy Asper but answered complaints from commissioners, to specify a more independent news service from CKCK-TV and a commitment to start over-the-air broadcasting within five years, but it would otherwise mostly consist of programming from CITV. Asper considered the final Harvard–Allarcom proposal inadequate under the definition of a "third service", while backers of the Harvard–Allarcom bid questioned whether Saskatchewan's TV advertising market could support the station established in the SaskWest/STV plan.

On September 12, 1985, the CRTC awarded the third-service licences to SaskWest based on its experience operating CKND, CanWest's financial resources, and its promised local programming. At the time, STV was slated to launch by September 1, 1986. Harvard and Allarcom moved to challenge the ruling in the Federal Court of Appeal and appealed to the federal cabinet with Harvard believing that any downturn in the profits from CKCK-TV could cause the company to fall into "financial jeopardy" because, despite being diversified into real estate, insurance, and oil and natural gas, the broadcasting division was responsible for more than half its total revenues.

The federal cabinet, agreeing with Harvard, remanded the applications to the CRTC for reconsideration on November 8, overturning the commission's initial decision. The decision was based on two questions: whether Regina and Saskatoon were combined or separate TV markets and whether they could support the introduction of a third television service. The news was a disappointment to SaskWest and its backers, faced with a setback in construction plans, who immediately suspected political lobbying had something to do with the ruling; Harvard chairman Fred Hill was noted for his closeness with the Conservatives, then in federal government. MPs representing Saskatoon admitted they had been lobbied by several groups; the entire 14-member Saskatchewan delegation to Parliament supported the Harvard appeal. SaskWest campaigned publicly as well as with the CRTC to rally support for its bid. Several provincial politicians bucked their federal parties to support SaskWest, including in the New Democratic Party and the Progressive Conservatives.

A second round of hearings opened in Regina on February 11, 1986. The primary topic of contention was whether existing stations such as CKCK-TV could withstand the introduction of a new service. SaskWest cited the profits CKCK-TV had reported to the CRTC in recent years, while Harvard and Allarcom believed a downturn in the economy was already occurring and hurting the stations. The CRTC in April ruled in favor of SaskWest and reaffirmed its original decision, noting that although Regina and Saskatoon were indeed separate markets, the stations there could economically withstand a new competitor.

== Construction and launch ==
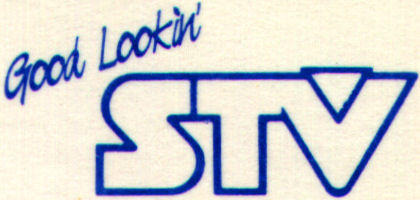
Logo used at launch when the stations were known as STV

After winning the second decision from the CRTC, SaskWest began the process of constructing the Regina and Saskatoon stations, each to be known as STV. This was the first time a Canadian broadcaster had built two stations simultaneously. In Regina, this included a tower near Lumsden, while the Saskatoon station would broadcast from the CBC's tower.

STV launched in both Regina (CFRE-TV 11) and Saskatoon (CFSK-TV 4) on September 6, 1987. In addition to local news programming, STV aired several non-news programs, including shows shared with CKND, such as Size Small Island.

In 1994, master control for STV-Saskatoon was centralized in Regina, essentially combining the stations outside of their local programming, once a fibre-optic link was completed between the two cities. In 1997, the STV name was discontinued when the Global Television Network brand was expanded throughout Canada, with both stations branding on-air simply as Global.

== News operation ==
When STV launched, it aired local news at noon and 6 and 10:30 p.m., the late news airing seven nights a week. The 10:30 slot allowed STV to air The World Tonight from Global in Toronto. The World Tonight was discontinued in November 1991, when a nightly sports highlights and talk show, Sportsline, replaced it. In 1994, the early news was reformatted as 555 Live, though this primarily consisted of an elongated tease into the 6 p.m. news half-hour. The 6 p.m. half hour moved to 5:30 p.m. in 2001 when Global National launched. Sportsline was retitled Global Sports at the same time and continued on the air until 2005, when it and its counterparts at other western Canadian Global stations were canceled. The nightly sports talk show was incorporated into an expanded hour-long late local newscast. The hour-long late newscasts in Regina, Saskatoon, and Winnipeg were split in 2007 into the 10 p.m. Prime News and the 11 p.m. Evening News.

On November 28, 2011, Global Regina expanded into morning news by debuting a three-hour morning newscast, with Global Saskatoon following suit on December 5. The move was part of a multi-market morning news expansion that included the establishment of similar programs in Winnipeg and the Maritimes. Prime News and News Final were consolidated into the hour-long News Hour Final on August 30, 2012.

Global evening newscasts in Saskatchewan and Manitoba use the company's multi-market content production model. Beginning in 2021, the newscasts for Regina, Saskatoon, and Winnipeg were presented from Winnipeg using production staff based in Regina.

=== Notable former on-air staff ===
==== Regina ====
- Jill Krop – news anchor, 1987

==== Saskatoon ====
- Darren Dutchyshen – sportscaster, to 1997
- Jay Onrait – sportscaster, late 1990s

== Technical information ==
=== Subchannel ===
Subchannel of CFRE-DT and CFSK-DT
Subchannel		Res.	Short name		Programming
CFRE-DT	CFSK-DT	Res.	CFRE-DT	CFSK-DT	Programming
11.1	4.1	1080i	CFRE-HD	CFSK-HD	Global

=== Analog-to-digital conversion ===
On August 10, 2011, three weeks before Canadian television stations in CRTC-designated mandatory markets were slated to transition from analog to digital broadcasts, CFRE flash cut its digital signal into operation on VHF channel 11. It was the first station in Regina to broadcast a digital or high-definition signal. Five days later on August 15, CFSK flash cut its digital signal into operation on UHF channel 42, using virtual channel 4.

On June 13, 2019, the CRTC approved a request by Corus to shut down its CFRE-TV-2 transmitter in Fort Qu'Appelle.
