= Children Believe =

Canadian charity

- Type: Child sponsorship organization, Humanitarian aid
- Location: Headquarters in Canada
- Region served: Burkina Faso, Ethiopia, Ghana, India, Nicaragua, Paraguay
- Website: childrenbelieve.ca

Children Believe was launched in October 2019, renamed from Christian Children's Fund of Canada. It is a Canadian charity that aims to improve the quality of life for children, families and communities in developing countries. The group targets five key areas of improvement in this regard: health and nutrition; education; water, sanitation and hygiene; strengthening community organizations; and sustainable livelihood development. Children Believe is a member of ChildFund Alliance, a global family of 12 child-centered development organizations.

== Spokespersons/ambassadors ==
Children Believe partners with public figures to serve as ambassadors for their work. The charity's ambassadors raise awareness, fundraise and educate the Canadian public on the Children Believe's work.

Children Believe partners with public figures to serve as ambassadors for their work. Children Believe's ambassadors raise awareness, fundraise and educate the Canadian public on the charity's work. Currently, Children Believe works with sportscaster James Duthie, sportscaster Rachel Bonnetta, and radio host Sharon Caddy.

The charity has offices in Burkina Faso, Ethiopia, Ghana, India, Nicaragua, and Paraguay.

== Reception ==
Children Believe received an overall grade of A− by MoneySense in their list of top 100 Canadian charities for 2015. They were selected as one of Canada's top 25 charities by the Financial Post for the year of 2014, with a grade of B+.
