= Gino Reda =

Canadian television host

- Born: August 8, 1960 (age 66); Peterborough, United Kingdom
- Occupation: Television personality
- Known for: That's Hockey, SportsCentre

Gino Reda (born August 8, 1960 as Luigino Reda in Italian) is a sports reporter and the host of TSN's That's Hockey.

== Early life ==
Reda arrived in Canada with his family in 1964. He lived in Toronto until he was 12, then moved to Etobicoke where he graduated from Kipling Collegiate Institute in 1979. While in highschool, he played varsity football and wrestled. He's an alum of the Ontario Bible College (now Tyndale University).

== Broadcasting career ==
When he was still in highschool (KCI), at 16 years of age, Reda began volunteering for a local cable company (MacLean Hunter) doing play-by-play for various sports including highschool basketball, volleyball, soccer, hockey and wrestling. As a 19-year-old, Reda and co-host Frank Giannone anchored a live weekly program called "CitySports". During the two years of the program, the show won the North American Cable award for "Best Live Sports Programing." Reda worked as a freelance play-by-play announcer for the Humber College Hawks, Junior B Hockey, Junior A box lacrosse, the Canadian National Soccer League and the Canadian National Gymnastics Championships between 1983 and 1987. In May 1986, Reda accepted a volunteer position as the field reporter covering the Toronto Blue Jays, for Sportsline at Global Television in Toronto. In September 1986, Reda was hired by then Sportsline Host Jim Tatti to a full-time position at Global.

He joined TSN in the summer of 1988 as a reporter covering the 1988 Summer Olympics in Seoul, Korea. He then covered the Dubin Inquiry throughout early 1989. After anchoring more than 3,000 shows over 12 years, Reda took over the reins of That's Hockey on TSN in 2002. During his time with TSN, Reda has hosted numerous international events including, the World Cup of Soccer, the World Cup of Rugby, numerous Olympic Games including Vancouver 2010, and was the host of the Gemini awarding winning crew that covered the World Jr Hockey Championship in Halifax in 2003.

Reda also currently serves as a host of Junior Hockey Magazine, a weekly nationally syndicated radio show, entering its 25th season, covering the weekly stories from the Canadian Hockey League.

Reda has also served as a volunteer co-host for numerous World Vision Television Programs.

== Honours ==
Reda has been a strong supporter of World Vision Canada and Special Olympics Canada for more than 15 years. In 2005, he was awarded the National Volunteer of the Year award by Special Olympics Canada. In 2013, he was honoured with the Queen Elizabeth II Diamond Jubilee Medal for his work with World Vision Canada.

In 2018, Reda was inducted into the Etobicoke Sports Hall of Fame, honouring his extensive sports media career.
