= Season of Champions on TSN =

Canadian curling telecasts

- Country of origin: Canada
- Original language: English

Original release
- Network: TSN

TSN's coverage of Curling consists of the Curling Canada, Continental Cup of Curling, the TSN Skins Game, the World Curling Championships, and Olympic Curling.

== Curling Canada ==
TSN originally broadcast Curling Canada (known through February 2015 as the Canadian Curling Association, or CCA) events, including the opening rounds of the Montana's Brier, the Scotties Tournament of Hearts from 1984-2003. CBC Sports, who had previously shared rights with TSN, became the sole broadcaster of CCA tournaments in 2004. The CCA terminated their deal with the CBC after one season. The CBC was criticized by the CCA, curling fans, and sponsors after the network moved some of its coverage to the digital cable channel CBC Country Canada. In 2006, the CCA and TSN signed an exclusive six-year contract which would take effect in 2008, ending CBC's 42-year relationship with the CCA.

== Announcers ==
=== Lead announcers ===
Don Chevrier and Ray Turnbull made up TSN's first broadcast team, calling matches from 1984 to 1985. Chevrier was succeeded by Vic Rauter. Rauter and Turnbull were later joined by Vera Pezer. In 1989, Linda Moore replaced Pezer on TSN's announcing team. Turnbull retired in 2010 and was replaced by Russ Howard. In December 2014, Moore announced that she was retiring from broadcasting for health reasons. Since then, Rauter and Howard had been joined by Cheryl Bernard, until Bernard left the booth in 2022. Until 2026, Joanne Courtney has joined Rauter and Howard on the lead team, until Rauter retired from broadcasting.

=== Secondary announcers ===
Bryan Mudryk and Cathy Gauthier currently serve as TSN's broadcast team for the morning draws of the Tim Hortons Brier and the Scotties Tournament of Hearts. In 2015, TSN increased its coverage to two games at the same time twice a day. Mudryk and David Nedohin served as the announcing team for the second game.

Other broadcasters TSN have used for curling include Rod Black, Stephanie LeDrew, John Wells, and Glenn Healy. Will Ferrell, in character as Ron Burgundy, also appeared in the broadcast booth alongside Rauter, Moore and Howard during the 2013 Canadian Olympic Curling Trials as a publicity stunt for Ferrell's new movie, Anchorman 2: The Legend Continues.
