= Cory Woron =

Canadian sportscaster and TV host

- Born: May 4, 1969 (age 57); Calgary, Alberta
- Occupation: Sports Broadcaster
- Known for: SportsCentre

Cory Woron (born May 4, 1969) is a Canadian sportscaster and a former host of TSN's SportsCentre.

== Broadcast career ==
Woron joined TSN in 2000, and was a host the weekday edition of TSN's flagship news program SportsCentre. He began his work for TSN on another programme called Ford That's Golf, before joining SportsCentre. He departed from TSN in February 2024 during a downsizing process at Bell Media, who own TSN.

Before joining TSN, Woron worked at Global TV in Winnipeg as a sports anchor. Prior to his time at Global TV, he worked as a sports radio reporter at CKNW in Vancouver as well as a Vancouver correspondent for ESPN Radio on WFAN in New York City. Woron also worked as a public address announcer for the IHL's Manitoba Moose during their 1999–2000 season.

Prior to becoming a journalist, Woron was an aspiring actor, living in Vancouver. His most notable role was as a guest on an episode of Danger Bay. He returned to acting, albeit as a sportscaster, in Swearnet: The Movie.
