= Vic Rauter =

Canadian sportscaster

- Occupation: Canadian sportscaster
- Known for: TSN, Season of Champions on TSN

Victor "Vic" Rauter (born May 1954) is a former Canadian sportscaster. Rauter anchored TSN's curling coverage for more than 40 years, providing play-by-play curling commentary for the Season of Champions on TSN, including events such as The Brier, Scotties Tournament of Hearts, and the World Curling Championships. He lives in Orillia, Ontario.

== Broadcasting career ==
Before joining TSN, Rauter was a sportscaster at the Canadian Broadcasting Corporation in Toronto covering the Olympic Games. He also worked for CFTR radio in Toronto as a news and sports reader before joining the Global Television Network in Toronto for four years.

Known as "the voice of curling" in Canada, Rauter currently provides play-by-play curling commentary for the Season of Champions on TSN, including events such as The Brier, Scotties Tournament of Hearts, and the World Curling Championships. When he started covering curling in 1986, his experience with the sport was limited to playing once or twice a year for fun. He reviewed old curling tapes to prepare for the job, and when doing commentary he would ask the analyst (at the time, Ray Turnbull) "simple, basic questions" to help viewers with less knowledge of the sport. He began enjoying the sport himself, and started curling twice a week the very next season.

In addition to his curling coverage for TSN, Rauter has covered auto racing and soccer since 1986 as well as hockey, bowling, squash, volleyball, cycling, rugby, equestrian, and skiing. He was the first host for the CFL on TSN from 1987 to 1988. In 2001, he was the play-by-play announcer for TSN's coverage of the Montreal Expos.

Rauter handled curling play-by-play duties for Canada's Olympic Broadcast Media Consortium during the Vancouver 2010 Olympic Winter Games.

Rauter's best-known catch phrases are "Make the final..." with the final score at the end of a game, and "Count 'em up—1, 2, 3, 4..." [or more] after the last stone of an end scoring three or more.

On April 2, 2026, Rauter announced that he would retire following the 2026 LGT World Men's Curling Championship.

== Awards ==
In 1999, Rauter was nominated for a Gemini Award as Canada's top sportscaster. In 2018, he was nominated for a Canadian Screen Award as Best Sports Play-by-Play Announcer.

In 2006, Rauter was inducted into the Canadian Curling Hall of Fame.

Preceded by Don Chevrier	TSN Lead Curling announcer 1986–2026	Incumbent
