= David Pratt (Canadian broadcaster) =

David Pratt is a former Canadian sports radio personality who co-hosted Vancouver's CKST TSN 1040 morning show from 2013 to 2019. With Don Taylor, he hosted the weekday afternoon talk show Pratt and Taylor from 2001 to 2011. Pratt was quoted in 2008 as saying the program had the highest sports-talk audience share "in the history of Canadian radio." In September 2011, Pratt's contract was not renewed by CKST. He moved to CKNW 980 to host a sports show but returned to CKST in September 2013, teaming up with Bro Jake Edwards for a 6-10 a.m. morning show. Pratt left CKST on March 13, 2019 due to cutbacks by Bell Media.

Pratt had a running feud with former Vancouver Canucks general manager Brian Burke that often found its way on to the show. A 50-year veteran of sports media, Pratt was formerly a correspondent and host of Last Call at sports cable channel TSN, where Pratt was an original broadcaster for the network, from 1984 until 2001, and worked at Vancouver radio stations CKLG, CFUN, CHRX, CKNW and CFOX, as well as CFJC in Kamloops and CJAV in Port Alberni (where he began his broadcasting career as a DJ in 1964).
