= Dave Randorf =

Canadian sportscaster (born 1967)

Dave Randorf (born July 31, 1967) is a Canadian sportscaster who serves as the play-by-play announcer for the television broadcasts of the National Hockey League's Tampa Bay Lightning. He is best known for his work at TSN hosting the network's Canadian Football League studio show as well as TSN's and CTV's coverage of figure skating. He also did play-by-play for the NHL on TSN (along with the regional coverage of the Montreal Canadiens), World Hockey Championship, and the National Lacrosse League on TSN.

== Biography ==
Randorf was born in Toronto and his family moved to Vancouver in 1978. He graduated from Seaquam Secondary School in the Sunshine Hills neighbourhood of North Delta, in the city of Delta, British Columbia. Randorf joined TSN in 1985 as an editorial assistant during his first year as a Radio and Television Arts student at Ryerson Polytechnical Institute. He worked in the TSN newsroom until 1989, when he returned to Vancouver. He joined Sports Page, a nightly sports show on CKVU-TV, as a reporter and anchor. While in Vancouver he also worked for radio station CKNW (AM), working on Vancouver Canucks radio broadcasts as a reporter, and later as game host. He also started hosting his own call-in show on the radio station in 1995. Later that year, Randorf left CKVU and returned to TSN as a Vancouver correspondent. He also played for the Frostbacks hockey club. In 1997, he became the full-time co-anchor of TSN's Pacific Prime edition of Sportsdesk (now SportsCentre), airing from TSN's Vancouver studios.

Randorf's duties at TSN quickly expanded as he covered numerous events, including U.S. Open golf, the Grey Cup, the Super Bowl, men's and women's Ice Hockey World Championships, Memorial Cup, Pan Am Games, and Canada Games. He has also hosted TSN's coverage of the 2000 Summer Olympics, 2002 Winter Olympics, 2004 Summer Olympics, and 2010 Winter Olympics. Working for Canada's Olympic Broadcast Media Consortium, Randorf co-hosted the CTV Olympic Morning block during the 2012 Summer Olympics.

Randorf was part of TSN's CFL crew from 1999 to 2013, calling the play-by-play action in 1999 and 2000 and hosting from 2001 until 2013. In addition, he was the play-by-play commentator for Montreal Canadiens regional games from 2011 to 2014.

On November 26, 2013, Rogers Media, the owners of the competing network Sportsnet, reached a 12-year deal to become the national rightsholder of the NHL worth $5.2 billion. In June 2014, Randorf officially joined Rogers to become one of the leading voices of their national coverage along with the revamped Hockey Night in Canada, ending his 17-year career at TSN.

Randorf has called two NHL All-Star Games. In 2019, after the departure of Paul Romanuk, Randorf was assigned to his first, and only, NHL Conference Final, the 2019 Western Conference Finals between the San Jose Sharks and the St. Louis Blues.

On January 7, 2021, Randorf was announced as the new television play-by-play announcer for the Tampa Bay Lightning on Bally Sports Sun in advance of the 2020–21 season. He took over after the team's previous announcer of 24 years, Rick Peckham, retired following the previous season.

== Nominations ==
Randorf was rewarded for his outstanding contribution to the world of sports with a 2000 Gemini Award nomination as Best Sports Broadcaster.
