= Lisa Bowes =

Canadian sports media personality

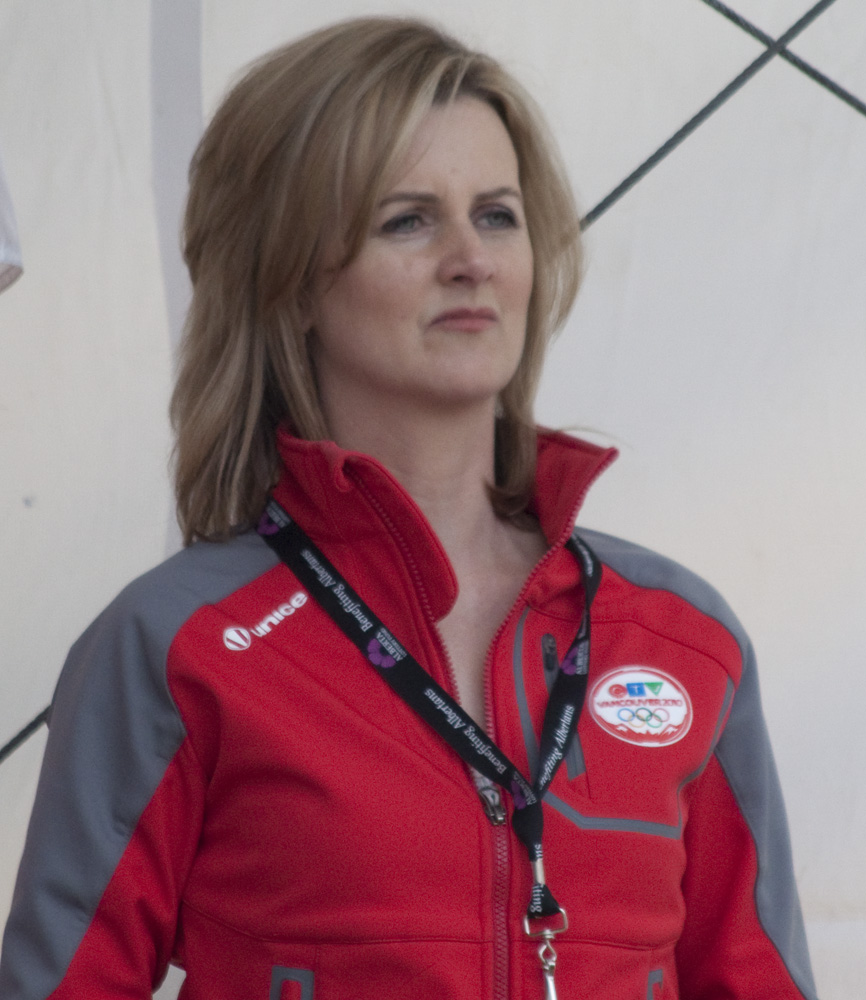
- Bowes in 2010
- Occupation: sports anchor

Lisa Bowes is a Canadian sports media personality.

She began her career as an editorial assistant at TSN in 1989. She later became a reporter for TSN in Winnipeg and Calgary. From 1997-1999 she was a commentator for TSN's SportsDesk. She then joined The Score as weekend anchor and host/producer of Sports Axxess.

A graduate of Western University, she made Canadian broadcasting history in 2000 when she became the play-by-play voice for the National Women's Hockey League. She later called basketball games for The Score, WTN and TSN2. While working for Canadian Broadcasting Corporation's Sports Journal she was nominated for a Canadian Screen Award (formerly Gemini Award) for best writing in an information program or series.

She is the author of the Lucy Tries Sports children's book series.
