= TSN2 =

Canadian pay television sports channel

- Country: Canada
- Broadcast area: National
- Headquarters: Toronto, Ontario

Programming
- Language: English
- Picture format: 1080i HDTV (downscaled to letterboxed 480i for the SDTV feed)

Ownership
- Owner: CTV Specialty Television
- Parent: The Sports Network Inc.
- Sister channels: TSN regional feeds RDS; RDS2; RDS Info

History
- Launched: 1997; 29 years ago
- Former names: TSN alternate feed (1997–2008)

Links
- Website: tsn.ca

Availability

Streaming media
- TSN Go: www.tsn.ca/tv/

TSN2 is a Canadian English-language discretionary sports specialty channel that acts as the secondary feed of sports-centred channel The Sports Network (TSN) and owned by CTV Specialty Television Inc. It was launched in its current form on August 29, 2008.

Following TSN's August 2014 expansion of its service into a regional sports network, TSN2 has served primarily as a secondary outlet for national programming. In 2017, TSN2 added regional Montreal Canadiens telecasts.

== History ==
The Canadian Radio-television and Telecommunications Commission (CRTC) had approved a separate TSN2 channel in 2000, but was never launched due to a prohibition on live programming. The authority for this channel expired in 2004 and was never re-applied for, so the present TSN2 is not directly connected to the 2000 licence.

TSN2 operates under the same CRTC licence for TSN as a whole, but initially operated under the legal fiction that it was a timeshift channel of TSN for Western Canada. This meant that the majority of programming must have been tape delayed from TSN's main feed, but it could still air a limited amount of alternative programming. With the early 2010 implementation of new conditions of licence from the CRTC which permit multiple feeds with no limits on additional programming, the tape delay is no longer observed, and the channel operates with an autonomous schedule.

=== TSN alternate feed ===
TSN first launched what it then called its "alternate feed" in 1997 as a result of occasional regional blackouts for TSN programming in some areas. In its original iteration, the alternate feed could only air on analogue cable in specific areas, replacing the national service, though it was offered in parallel with the main feed on national satellite providers. Alternate programming could make up a maximum of 10% of the TSN schedule—an average of 2.4 hours a day.

In fall 2006, the CRTC allowed TSN to air multiple feeds nationally, with the alternate feed only available on digital platforms, as had previously been permitted for Sportsnet's regional feeds. In essence, this meant that for digital cable and satellite subscribers, TSN now had two channels on which to air programming. The broadcaster's use of the alternate feed changed significantly following this decision, as the alternate feed began to carry a much larger number of live events that could be aired nationally when the main feed was carrying another ongoing event.

=== Launch of TSN2 ===
TSN2's original logo used from 2010 until August 25, 2014. Prior to 2010, the red-coloured curved rhombus was absent, closer resembling the logo of ESPN2.

On August 6, 2008, The Globe and Mail announced that the TSN alternate feed would be replaced by a new network known as TSN2. The new channel promised "major league programming" throughout the day, and would have extensive coverage of auto racing and tennis. Unlike the existing TSN alternate feed, which was available free of charge, service providers (and potentially, in turn, consumers) would be required to pay extra in order to carry TSN2, and the alternate feed was discontinued in August 2008. Unlike the alternate feed, TSN2 would also be available in high definition.

Initially, TSN2 was restricted to acting as a timeshift channel for TSN, with most non-live programming being aired on a three-hour tape delay from TSN proper, allowing TSN2 viewers in the Pacific Time Zone to watch many programs at the same local time as TSN viewers in the Eastern Time Zone (ET). However, as had been the case with the alternate feed, up to 10% of the TSN2 schedule could consist of alternative live sporting events that cannot air on TSN due to other programming commitments.

On August 8, 2008, CTVglobemedia and ESPN Inc. (via their joint venture CTV Specialty Television) were granted the CRTC approval for a TSN spin-off called TSN Extra, a channel focuses on college sports plus simulcasts of TSN's sports properties.

The new channel was launched on August 29, 2008, at 7 p.m. ET in standard and high definition, with live coverage of the US Open tennis tournament continued from TSN, followed by an encore presentation of a Friday night CFL game aired earlier on TSN.

Since February 1, 2010, TSN has been subject to revised conditions of licence (since formalized as Category C licensing) that allow TSN2 to operate autonomously from TSN's main channel as a pure multiplex. TSN launched three more multiplex channels—TSN3, TSN4, and TSN5, on August 25, 2014, serving primarily as regional feeds of TSN.

== Programming ==
Upon its launch, TSN2 promised that it would air over 800 hours per year of live events, and that it would also feature repeat broadcasts of live events that were shown by TSN earlier in the night. Repeat broadcasts of TSN's original programming (such as SportsCentre) would fill out the schedule.

TSN2's alternative programming typically consists of National Basketball Association games featuring the Toronto Raptors, and NASCAR Xfinity Series races. However, it has also included tennis, boxing, baseball, and Major League Lacrosse coverage.

On October 22, 2008, TSN2 announced it would air 25 Toronto Raptors basketball games during the 2008–09 NBA season. However, due to the lack of carriage agreements at the time, these games were not available to cable subscribers in the team's home market of Toronto and other regions served by Rogers Cable.

On August 20, 2010, TSN2 announced it had signed a multi-year agreement with Canada Basketball to become the exclusive Canadian broadcaster of various international basketball tournaments. Under the terms of the two-year deal, TSN2 was the exclusive broadcaster of the 2010 FIBA World Championship, 2010 FIBA World Championship for Women, FIBA Americas Championship 2011, and FIBA Americas Championship for Women 2011. For its 2010 edition, TSN and TSN2 became the new Canadian broadcasters of the Spengler Cup hockey tournament. TSN2 would broadcast most of the tournament's games.

On February 18, 2013, TSN2 introduced simulcasts of two shows from TSN Radio, Mike Richards in the Morning, and the new TSN Drive with Dave Naylor.

As of the 2017–18 season, TSN2 broadcasts regional Montreal Canadiens games, which are subject to blackout outside of the team's designated media market.

== Carriage ==
Providers that carry TSN2 include Access Communications, Bell Aliant, Bell MTS, Bell Satellite TV, Cogeco, EastLink, Execulink Telecom, NorthernTel, Novus, Rogers, SaskTel, Shaw Cable, Shaw Direct, Telus Optik TV, Valley Fiber, Vidéotron, and a number of independent cable systems.

Rogers Cable, which serves much of the Greater Toronto Area, notably did not carry TSN2 from its launch, leaving cable viewers without the ability to view the select Toronto Raptors NBA games that TSN2 aired in the team's own home market in the season following the launch. After months of negotiations, TSN2 was finally added to the lineup in May 2009, before that year's first division rivalry series between the American League East's Toronto Blue Jays (also owned by Rogers) and the Boston Red Sox.

== Regulatory status ==
The Globe and Mail reported on September 15, 2008, that the Canadian Broadcasting Corporation (who have a licence for CBC SportsPlus, a sports channel focusing on Canadian athletes with a particular interest on amateur sports) and Score Media (owners of The Score, whose ability to air live programming is restricted due to being licensed as a sports news service akin to ESPNews) made a complaint to the CRTC accusing TSN2 of exploiting the rules which allow timeshift feeds for the west coast, subject to regulatory requirements restricting the amount of alternate programming that can be shown on alternate feeds. John Levy of Score Media claimed that TSN2 should not be allowed to sell new advertising on the network based on their interpretation of the rules. However, these complaints were dismissed by the CRTC.

Soon after TSN2 was launched, the CRTC announced a proposal to remove genre exclusivity protections for "mainstream sports" and "national news" channels in the near future. As a byproduct of the decision, TSN would be allowed to use streamlined conditions of licence which states that the service may offer "multiple feeds", without any restrictions on alternate programming. TSN was officially permitted to use these streamlined conditions of licence on February 1, 2010.
