= Darren Dreger =

Canadian sportscaster for TSN

- Born: June 13, 1968 (age 58); Red Deer, Alberta, Canada
- Education: Western Academy Broadcasting College
- Occupations: Sportscaster, and analyst
- Employer: Bell Media
- Known for: Sportscaster on The NHL on TSN
- Spouse: Holly
- Children: 2

Darren Dreger (born June 13, 1968) is a Canadian sportscaster for TSN, and is one of TSN's Hockey Insiders. He had previously hosted Leafs Lunch on CFMJ AM640 Toronto Radio.

== Broadcasting career ==
After graduating from the Western Academy Broadcasting College, Dreger was immediately offered a job from a radio station in Winkler, Manitoba. However, on the same day, he was offered another job closer to home, which he accepted. Beginning in 1992, Dreger lent his voice as a play-by-play announcer for the Brandon Wheat Kings. This lasted until 1993 when he was hired to replace Daren Millard at CTV Winnipeg. While there, he also conducted play-by-play for the Manitoba Moose of the American Hockey League.

From Winnipeg, Dreger moved to Edmonton in 1997 to report on Edmonton Oilers games and was subsequently hired by Sportsnet as a national host for their NHL package in 1998. Dreger was the former host of Hockey Central on Rogers Sportsnet between 1998 and 2006. On July 14, 2006, it was announced that Dreger would leave Sportsnet and join TSN on July 31, 2006, hence 'crossing the parking lot'.

In October 2014, Bob McKenzie and Dreger began appearing as a full-time contributors on NBCSN, until NBC Sports lost the NHL hockey rights to both ESPN and Turner Sports in 2021. This was because TSN lost their NHL broadcasting rights package to Sportsnet.

== Personal life ==
Dreger was born in Red Deer, Alberta, and grew up in Saskatchewan. Dreger and his wife Holly have two children together, a son and a daughter.
