= James Duthie (sportscaster) =

Canadian sportscaster

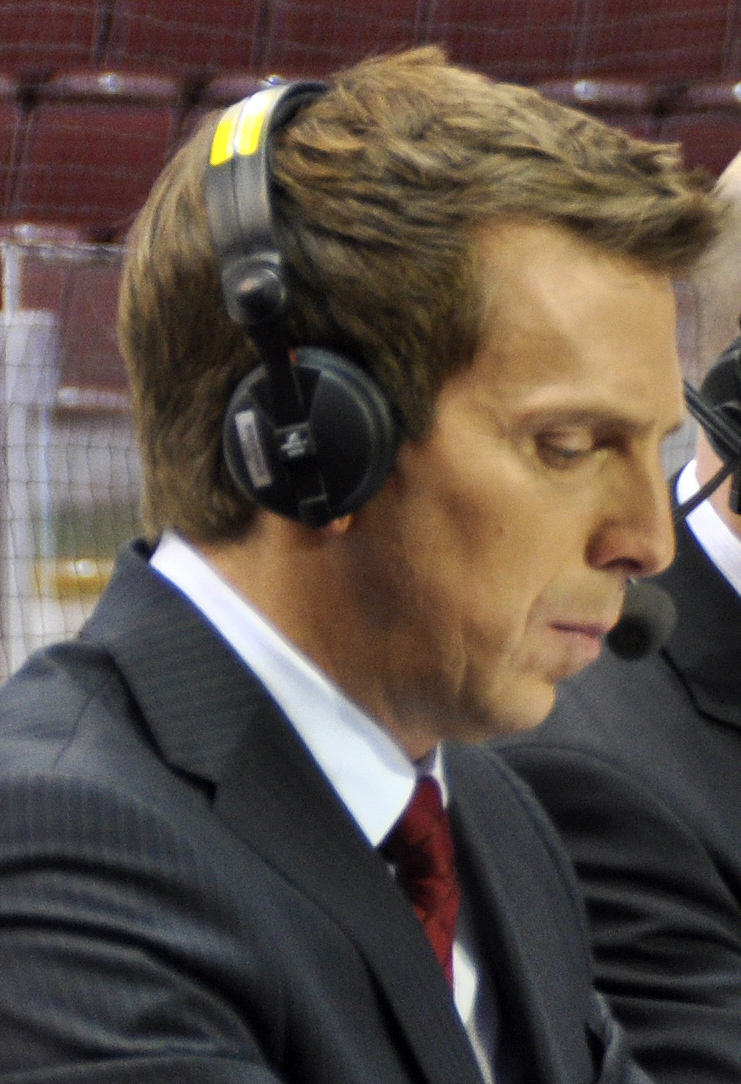
- Duthie at the 2010 Winter Olympics
- Born: May 13, 1966 (age 60); Ottawa, Ontario, Canada
- Occupation: Sports broadcaster
- Known for: TSN Hockey

James Duthie (born May 13, 1966) is a Canadian sportscaster for TSN and the host of TSN's hockey coverage.

== Early life ==
James Duthie was born May 13, 1966, in Ottawa, Ontario. He has a bachelor's degree in journalism from Carleton University.

== Broadcasting career ==
Duthie is currently the host of TSN's hockey coverage, as well as the IIHF World Junior Hockey Championship, the CFL Grey Cup, the Super Bowl, and The Masters golf tournament.

Before moving to TSN in 1998, Duthie worked at VTV and covered news and sports for eight years on CJOH, the CTV affiliate in Ottawa. At CTV Ottawa, he won an International Edward R. Murrow Award for news reporting.

Duthie worked with CTV to produce the 2010 Olympic Games in Vancouver, and the 2012 Games in London. He was one of the main hosts. He is also known for producing many humorous videos for TSN, including The Panel Hangover, Puck over Glass, and a series of bits featuring Roberto Luongo.

Duthie is a charity ambassador, representing the Christian Children's Fund of Canada in the cause to help beat poverty in developing countries.

Duthie was a touch football standout in the “c division” MTTFL. Duthie's career was cut short due to a downfield head-to-head collision.

== Podcast ==
In 2017, Duthie launched The Rubber Boots Podcast, where he discusses sports and other topics with TSN staffers Lester McLean, Sean 'Puffy' Cameron, and Producer Stoff.

== Awards ==
Duthie is an eight-time Canadian Screen Award winner, receiving the award for Best Sports Host in a Sports Program or Series in 2018 sharing the same award with SportsCentre anchor Rod Smith in 2014, winning Best Sports Feature Segment for his work on “The Butterfly Child” in 2016, and winning Best Sports Host for TSN's Free Agent Frenzy in 2019 and 2020. Duthie's first three awards were the previously named Gemini Award, receiving recognition for his work on TSN's coverage of the 2011 NHL All-Star Fantasy Draft, TradeCentre ’09, and his work on Canada's Olympic Broadcast Media Consortium's coverage of the Vancouver 2010 Olympic Winter Games, where he worked as co-host alongside Lisa Laflamme. Duthie also won the 2009 Excellence in Sports Broadcasting award from Sports Media Canada for his work as host of TSN's NHL coverage.

In 2022, the City of Ottawa awarded Duthie the key to the city.

== Books ==
Duthie has released four books: They Call Me Killer (2010), a collection of stories from legendary junior hockey coach Brian Kilrea, the essay collection The Day I (Almost) Killed Two Gretzkys (2010), and The Guy on the Left (2015), which tells the story of Duthie's career in broadcasting. Duthie's latest book Beauties: Hockey's Greatest Untold Stories (2020) is a collection of 57 stories from hockey's finest superstars, journeymen, coaches, referees, broadcasters, agents, and hockey moms and dads.

== Filmography ==
- Goon: Last of the Enforcers (2016) as a sportscaster
