= SC with Jay Onrait =

- Also known as: SportsCentre with Jay and Dan (2017–2021)
- Genre: Sports; Comedy
- Based on: SportsCentre
- Presented by: Jay Onrait (2017–present); Dan O'Toole (2017–2021)
- Country of origin: Canada
- Original language: English

Production
- Production locations: 9 Channel Nine Court; Scarborough, Toronto, Ontario

Original release
- Network: TSN
- Release: September 4, 2017 – present

Related
- SportsCentre; Fox Sports Live with Jay and Dan

SC with Jay Onrait (formerly known as SC with Jay and Dan) is a Canadian sports news program that airs on TSN. Hosted by Jay Onrait, it is a spiritual successor to the late-night edition of SportsCentre that Onrait and Dan O'Toole hosted until 2013 (which they left to host Fox Sports 1's Fox Sports Live, before returning to TSN in 2017), which featured a more comedy-oriented format. The duo also produced a weekly podcast, Jay and Dan Podcast. The program debuted as SC with Jay and Dan on September 4, 2017, being hosted by Onrait and O'Toole.

On December 21, 2017, it was announced that SC with Jay and Dan would be moving from a Monday–Friday schedule to a Sunday–Thursday schedule in 2018.

On February 2, 2021, Dan O'Toole was laid off by Bell Media as part of a wider series of cuts across the company, which led to the program being placed on hiatus. The program's final show with O'Toole aired the morning of February 4.

The program began airing again on February 7, 2021 after Super Bowl LV, rebranded as SC with Jay Onrait.
