= List of Toronto Blue Jays broadcasters =

This page details the broadcasters for the Toronto Blue Jays Major League Baseball team.

== Television ==
Sportsnet

- Dan Shulman, primary play-by-play announcer (1995–2001, 2016–present),
- Jamie Campbell, primary studio host (2005–present),
- Joe Siddall, primary color commentator, former studio analyst and alternate color commentator (2018–present),
- Hazel Mae, field-level reporter and alternate studio host (2015–present)
- Brad Fay, alternate studio host (2010–present)
- Matt Devlin, alternate play-by play announcer (2013–2014, 2016–2017, 2022–2023)
- Arden Zwelling, alternate field–level reporter (2011–present)
- Ben Shulman, alternate play-by-play announcer (2024–present)
- Caleb Joseph, primary studio analyst and alternate color commentator (2023–present)
- Madison Shipman, alternate studio analyst (2023–present)
- Kevin Pillar, alternate studio analyst (2025–present)

TVA Sports (French)

- Denis Casavant, play-by-play (2022–present)
- Rodger Brulotte, color commentator (2011–2025)

== Radio ==
Sportsnet 590 the Fan / Toronto Blue Jays Radio Network

- Ben Shulman, play-by-play announcer (2022–present)
- Eric Smith, alternate play-by-play announcer (2024–present)
- Chris Leroux, primary color commentator (2018–present),
- Ben Nicholson-Smith, alternate color commentator (2024–present)
- Blake Murphy, alternate color commentator (2024–present)

== Former ==
=== Radio ===
- Ben Wagner, co-play-by-play announcer (2018–2020), play-by-play announcer (August 2021–2023)
- Simulcast of Sportsnet TV audio (April–July 2021)
- Alan Ashby, play-by-play and colour commentator (2007–2012)
- Kevin Barker, occasional colour commentator (2018–2020)
- Tom Cheek, play-by-play announcer (1977–2004) (deceased; 2013 Ford C. Frick Award winner)
- Dirk Hayhurst, substitute colour commentator (2013)
- Jerry Howarth, play-by-play announcer (1981–2017)
- Gary Matthews, colour commentator (2000–2001)
- Jack Morris, colour commentator (2013)
- Warren Sawkiw, colour commentator (2005–2006)
- Joe Siddall, colour commentator (2014–2017)
- Duane Ward, substitute colour commentator (2014–2017) (deceased)
- Mike Wilner, substitute/co-play-by-play announcer and studio host (2002–2020)
- Early Wynn, colour commentator (1977–1981) (deceased)

=== Television ===
- Buck Martinez, primary color commentator and alternate play-by-play announcer (2010–2025) (former colour commentator on TSN 1987–2000)
- Alan Ashby, substitute play-by-play and colour commentator (2007–2012)
- Jesse Barfield, colour commentator (2007–2008)
- Rod Black, play-by-play announcer (1999–2009)
- Tom Candiotti, colour commentator (2005–2006)
- Joe Carter, colour commentator (1999–2000)
- John Cerutti, colour commentator (1997–2004) (deceased)
- Don Chevrier, play-by-play announcer (1977–1996) (deceased)
- Jacques Doucet, French-language play-by-play announcer (2011–2022)
- Rob Faulds, play-by-play announcer (2001–2004), occasional play-by-play announcer (2012-15)
- Darrin Fletcher, colour commentator (2005–2009)
- Whitey Ford, colour commentator (1977) (deceased)
- Elliotte Friedman, play-by-play announcer (2007–2008)
- Jim Hughson, play-by-play announcer (1990–1994, 2007–2008) (then lead play-by-play announcer with Hockey Night in Canada)
- Tommy Hutton, colour commentator (1990–1996)
- Tony Kubek, colour commentator (1977–1989) (2009 Ford C. Frick Award winner)
- Tom McKee, Host, field reporter, Producer of Blue Jays Baseball (1977–1992) (2013 George Gross Career Achievement Award)
- Rance Mulliniks, colour commentator (2005–2010)
- Fergie Olver, play-by-play announcer, field reporter, and host (1981–1996)
- Ken Singleton, colour commentator (1985–1986)
- Pat Tabler, colour commentator (2001–2022)
- Brian Williams, play-by-play announcer (1993–2002)
- Gregg Zaun, studio analyst (2011–2017)

== Chronology ==
=== Television ===
==== 1990s ====
Year	Network	Play-by-play	Colour commentator(s)	Field-level reporter
1999	CBC	Brian Williams	John Cerutti	Mark Lee
1999	TSN	Dan Shulman	Buck Martinez	
1999	CTV Sportsnet	Rod Black	Joe Carter	
1998	CBC	Brian Williams	John Cerutti	Mark Lee
1998	TSN	Dan Shulman	Buck Martinez	
1997	CBC	Brian Williams	John Cerutti	Mark Lee
1997	TSN	Dan Shulman	Buck Martinez	
1996	CBC	Brian Williams	Tommy Hutton	Ken Daniels
1996	TSN	Dan Shulman	Buck Martinez	
1996	BBS	Don Chevrier	Tommy Hutton	Fergie Olver
1995	CBC	Brian Williams	Tommy Hutton	Ken Daniels
1995	TSN	Dan Shulman	Buck Martinez	
1995	BBS	Don Chevrier	Tommy Hutton	Fergie Olver
1994	CBC	Brian Williams	Tommy Hutton	Ken Daniels
1994	TSN	Jim Hughson	Buck Martinez	
1994	Baton/ONT	Don Chevrier	Tommy Hutton	Fergie Olver
1993	CBC	Brian Williams	Tommy Hutton	Ken Daniels
1993	TSN	Jim Hughson	Buck Martinez	
1993	Baton/ONT	Don Chevrier	Tommy Hutton	Fergie Olver
1992	CBC	Don Chevrier	Tommy Hutton	Ken Daniels
1992	TSN	Jim Hughson	Buck Martinez	
1992	Baton/ONT	Don Chevrier	Tommy Hutton	Fergie Olver
1991	CTV	Don Chevrier	Tommy Hutton	Fergie Olver
1991	TSN	Jim Hughson	Buck Martinez	
1990	CTV	Don Chevrier	Tommy Hutton	Fergie Olver
1990	TSN	Jim Hughson	Buck Martinez	

==== 1980s ====
Year	Network	Play-by-play	Colour commentator(s)	Field-level reporter
1989	CTV	Don Chevrier	Tony Kubek	Fergie Olver
1989	TSN	Fergie Olver	Buck Martinez	
1988	CTV	Don Chevrier	Tony Kubek	Fergie Olver
1988	TSN	Fergie Olver	Buck Martinez	
1987	CTV	Don Chevrier	Tony Kubek	Fergie Olver
1987	TSN	Fergie Olver	Buck Martinez	
1986	CTV	Don Chevrier	Tony Kubek	Fergie Olver
1986	TSN	Fergie Olver	Ken Singleton	
1985	CTV	Don Chevrier	Tony Kubek	Fergie Olver
1985	TSN	Fergie Olver	Ken Singleton	
1984	CTV	Don Chevrier	Tony Kubek	Fergie Olver
1984	TSN	Fergie Olver	Various	
1983	CTV	Don Chevrier	Tony Kubek	Fergie Olver
1982	CTV	Don Chevrier	Tony Kubek	Fergie Olver
1981	CTV	Don Chevrier	Tony Kubek	Fergie Olver
1980	CBC	Don Chevrier	Tony Kubek	Tom McKee

=== Radio ===
==== 1990s ====
Year	Flagship Station	Play-by-play #1	Play-by-play #2	Studio Host
1993	CJCL	Tom Cheek	Jerry Howarth	
1992	CJCL	Tom Cheek	Jerry Howarth	

== See also ==
- MLB on TSN
- List of current Major League Baseball announcers
- List of Toronto Maple Leafs broadcasters
- List of Toronto Raptors broadcasters
