= List of American League Championship Series broadcasters =

The following is a list of the national television and radio networks and announcers that have broadcast American League Championship Series games over the years. It does include any announcers who may have appeared on local broadcasts produced by the participating teams.

== National television ==
=== 2020s ===
Year	Network	Play-by-play	Color commentator(s)	Field reporter(s)	Pregame hosts	Pregame analysts	Trophy presentation
2026	TBS/TruTV/HBO Max	Brian Anderson	Ron Darling and Jeff Francoeur	Lauren Shehadi	Adam Lefkoe	Jimmy Rollins, Pedro Martínez, and Curtis Granderson	Lauren Shehadi
2025	Fox (Games 1–2, 7) (US)	Joe Davis	John Smoltz	Ken Rosenthal and Tom Verducci	Matt Vasgersian (Game 1, 6); Kevin Burkhardt (Games 2–5, 7)	Alex Rodriguez, David Ortiz, Derek Jeter, and Dontrelle Willis	Tom Verducci
2025	FS1 (Games 2–7) (US)	Joe Davis	John Smoltz	Ken Rosenthal and Tom Verducci	Matt Vasgersian (Game 1, 6); Kevin Burkhardt (Games 2–5, 7)	Alex Rodriguez, David Ortiz, Derek Jeter, and Dontrelle Willis	Tom Verducci
2025	Sportsnet (Canada)	Dan Shulman	Buck Martinez	Hazel Mae, Caleb Joseph, and Kevin Pillar	Jamie Campbell	Joe Siddall and Madison Shipman	Tom Verducci
2024	TBS/Max	Brian Anderson	Ron Darling and Jeff Francoeur	Lauren Jbara	Lauren Shehadi	Jimmy Rollins, Pedro Martínez, Curtis Granderson, and Dusty Baker	Lauren Jbara
2024	TruTV/Max (DataCast)	Jon Paul Morosi	Dexter Fowler and Mike Petriello	—N/a	Lauren Shehadi	Jimmy Rollins, Pedro Martínez, Curtis Granderson, and Dusty Baker	Lauren Jbara
2023	Fox (Game 1–2, 7)	Joe Davis	John Smoltz	Ken Rosenthal and Tom Verducci	Matt Vasgersian (Game 1, 6); Kevin Burkhardt (Games 2–5, 7)	Alex Rodriguez, David Ortiz, and Derek Jeter	Kevin Burkhardt
2023	FS1 (Games 2–7)	Joe Davis	John Smoltz	Ken Rosenthal and Tom Verducci	Matt Vasgersian (Game 1, 6); Kevin Burkhardt (Games 2–5, 7)	Alex Rodriguez, David Ortiz, and Derek Jeter	Kevin Burkhardt
2022	TBS	Brian Anderson	Ron Darling and Jeff Francoeur	Lauren Shehadi	Bob Costas	Jimmy Rollins, Pedro Martínez, and Curtis Granderson	Lauren Shehadi
2021	Fox (Game 1–2)	Joe Buck	John Smoltz	Ken Rosenthal and Tom Verducci	Kevin Burkhardt	Alex Rodriguez, David Ortiz, and Frank Thomas	Kevin Burkhardt
2021	FS1 (Games 2–6)	Joe Buck	John Smoltz	Ken Rosenthal and Tom Verducci	Kevin Burkhardt	Alex Rodriguez, David Ortiz, and Frank Thomas	Kevin Burkhardt
2020	TBS	Brian Anderson	Ron Darling and Jeff Francoeur	Lauren Shehadi	Ernie Johnson	Jimmy Rollins, Pedro Martínez, and Curtis Granderson	Lauren Shehadi

==== Notes ====
- Beginning in 2022, the new 7-year Major League Baseball contract called for both Fox network and FS1 to air more post-season games (two Divisional Series and one best-of-7 League Championship Series) while keeping the regular season structure intact. The deal saw Fox continue to air the All-Star Game and the World Series exclusively. However, Fox has expanded digital rights and will air at least two of the first four League Championship Series games and all seventh games in its league from 2020 to 2028. Also, TBS will air Tuesday Night Baseball for the duration of the contract.
- 2023 – Matt Vasgersian filled in for Kevin Burkhardt as pregame host for Games 1 and 6 due to Burkhardt calling the San Francisco 49ers–Cleveland Browns Week 6 and Detroit Lions–Baltimore Ravens Week 7 NFL games for Fox.
  - Beginning with the 2022 postseason, MLB allowed Sportsnet, the home network of the Toronto Blue Jays, to produce their own broadcasts of the team's games in Canada rather than a mere simulcast of the American network feed or an MLB International-produced broadcast.
- 2025 – Matt Vasgersian filled in for Kevin Burkhardt as pregame host for Games 1 and 6 due to Burkhardt calling the Los Angeles Rams–Baltimore Ravens Week 6 and Washington Commanders–Dallas Cowboys Week 7 NFL games for Fox.

=== 2010s ===
Year	Network	Play-by-play	Color commentator(s)	Field reporter(s)	Pregame hosts	Pregame analysts	Trophy presentation
2019	Fox (Game 1)	Joe Buck (Games 1–3, 5–6); Joe Davis (Game 4)	John Smoltz	Ken Rosenthal and Tom Verducci	Kevin Burkhardt	Alex Rodriguez, David Ortiz, and Frank Thomas	Kevin Burkhardt
2019	FS1 (Games 2–6)	Joe Buck (Games 1–3, 5–6); Joe Davis (Game 4)	John Smoltz	Ken Rosenthal and Tom Verducci	Kevin Burkhardt	Alex Rodriguez, David Ortiz, and Frank Thomas	Kevin Burkhardt
2018	TBS	Brian Anderson	Ron Darling	Lauren Shehadi	Casey Stern	Gary Sheffield, Pedro Martínez, and Jimmy Rollins	Brian Anderson
2017	FS1 (Games 1, 3–7)	Joe Buck	John Smoltz	Ken Rosenthal and Tom Verducci	Kevin Burkhardt	Alex Rodriguez, David Ortiz, Keith Hernandez, and Frank Thomas	Tom Verducci
2017	Fox (Game 2)	Joe Buck	John Smoltz	Ken Rosenthal and Tom Verducci	Kevin Burkhardt	Alex Rodriguez, David Ortiz, Keith Hernandez, and Frank Thomas	Tom Verducci
2016	TBS (U.S.)	Ernie Johnson	Ron Darling and Cal Ripken	Sam Ryan	Casey Stern	Gary Sheffield, Pedro Martínez, and Jimmy Rollins	Ernie Johnson
2016	Sportsnet (Canada)	Ernie Johnson	Ron Darling and Cal Ripken	Sam Ryan	Casey Stern	Gary Sheffield, Pedro Martínez, and Jimmy Rollins	Ernie Johnson
2015	Fox (Game 1) (U.S.)	Joe Buck	Harold Reynolds and Tom Verducci	Ken Rosenthal and Erin Andrews	Kevin Burkhardt	Raúl Ibañez (Games 1–5), Pete Rose, Frank Thomas, Max Scherzer, Alex Rodriguez (Games 3–6), and C. J. Nitkowski (Game 6)	Erin Andrews
2015	FS1 (Games 2–6) (U.S.)	Joe Buck	Harold Reynolds and Tom Verducci	Ken Rosenthal and Erin Andrews	Kevin Burkhardt	Raúl Ibañez (Games 1–5), Pete Rose, Frank Thomas, Max Scherzer, Alex Rodriguez (Games 3–6), and C. J. Nitkowski (Game 6)	Erin Andrews
2015	Sportsnet (Canada)	Joe Buck	Harold Reynolds and Tom Verducci	Ken Rosenthal and Erin Andrews	Kevin Burkhardt	Raúl Ibañez (Games 1–5), Pete Rose, Frank Thomas, Max Scherzer, Alex Rodriguez (Games 3–6), and C. J. Nitkowski (Game 6)	Erin Andrews
2014	TBS	Ernie Johnson	Ron Darling and Cal Ripken	Matt Winer, Mike Bordick, and Steve Physioc	Casey Stern	Gary Sheffield and Pedro Martínez	Ernie Johnson
2013	Fox	Joe Buck	Tim McCarver	Ken Rosenthal and Erin Andrews	Matt Vasgersian	Harold Reynolds and Michael Cuddyer	Erin Andrews
2012	TBS	Ernie Johnson	Ron Darling and John Smoltz	Craig Sager	Matt Winer	David Wells, Cal Ripken, and Dennis Eckersley	Matt Winer
2011	Fox	Joe Buck	Terry Francona (Games 1–2); Tim McCarver (Games 3–6)	Ken Rosenthal	Chris Rose	Eric Karros and A. J. Pierzynski	Chris Rose
2010	TBS	Ernie Johnson	Ron Darling and John Smoltz	Craig Sager	Matt Winer	David Wells, Cal Ripken, and Dennis Eckersley	Matt Winer

==== Notes ====
- 2011 – Terry Francona filled for Tim McCarver for the first two games of Fox's coverage during the ALCS because McCarver was recovering from a minor heart procedure.
- Beginning in 2014, when Fox Sports began a new television contract with Major League Baseball, FS1 airs 40 regular season MLB games (mostly on Saturdays), along with up to 15 post-season games (eight Divisional Series games and one best-of-7 League Championship Series). The deal resulted in a reduction of MLB coverage on the Fox network, which will air 12 regular season games, the All-Star Game, and the World Series.
- 2014 – Mike Bordick, a color commentator for the Orioles' regular-season telecasts, and Steve Physioc, a play-by-play man for the Royals' TV/radio broadcasts, were employed as field-level commentators for TBS' coverage along with Matt Winer.
  - The start of Game 1 was delayed by four minutes due to floodlights from TBS' pre-game show set not being turned off in time.
- 2016 – Sportsnet, a property of Toronto Blue Jays owner Rogers Communications, aired all games in Canada using the TBS feeds.
- 2018 – Brian Anderson took over for Ernie Johnson as the lead play-by-play man for TBS, after Johnson dropped out of TBS’ postseason coverage entirely after announcing that he had been diagnosed with blood clots in both of his legs. Anderson would’ve taken Johnson's place anyway due to the latter's Inside the NBA duties for TNT.
- 2019 – Joe Davis called play-by-play for Game 4 due to Joe Buck calling Thursday Night Football for Fox.

=== 2000s ===
Year	Network	Play-by-play	Color commentator(s)	Field reporter(s)	Pregame hosts	Pregame analysts	Trophy presentation
2009	Fox	Joe Buck	Tim McCarver	Ken Rosenthal and Chris Myers (Games 1–5)	Chris Rose	Eric Karros and Mark Grace	Kenny Albert
2008	TBS	Chip Caray	Ron Darling and Buck Martinez	Craig Sager	Ernie Johnson	Harold Reynolds, Cal Ripken, and Dennis Eckersley	Ernie Johnson
2007	Fox	Joe Buck	Tim McCarver	Ken Rosenthal and Chris Myers	Jeanne Zelasko	Kevin Kennedy, Joe Girardi, Mark Grace, and Eric Karros	Chris Myers
2006	Fox	Thom Brennaman	Lou Piniella; Steve Lyons (Games 1–3); José Mota (Game 4)	Chris Myers	Jeanne Zelasko	Kevin Kennedy and A. J. Pierzynski	Chris Myers
2005	Fox	Joe Buck	Tim McCarver and Lou Piniella	Chris Myers and Patrick O'Neal	Jeanne Zelasko	Kevin Kennedy	Chris Myers
2004	Fox	Joe Buck	Tim McCarver and Al Leiter	Chris Myers and Kenny Albert	Jeanne Zelasko	Kevin Kennedy	Kenny Albert
2003	Fox	Joe Buck	Tim McCarver and Bret Boone	Chris Myers, Kenny Albert, and Curt Menefee	Jeanne Zelasko	Kevin Kennedy	Kenny Albert
2002	Fox	Thom Brennaman	Steve Lyons	Chris Myers	Jeanne Zelasko	Kevin Kennedy	Jeanne Zelasko
2001	Fox	Thom Brennaman (in Seattle); Joe Buck (in New York)	Steve Lyons (in Seattle); Tim McCarver (in New York)	—N/a	Jeanne Zelasko	Kevin Kennedy	Jeanne Zelasko
2000	NBC	Bob Costas	Joe Morgan	Jim Gray and Jimmy Roberts		—N/a	Jim Gray

==== Notes ====
- Game 6 of the 2000 ALCS is the last baseball game that NBC televised until a game between the Boston Red Sox and Chicago White Sox on May 8, 2022. In Houston, due to the coverage of the 2000 U.S. presidential debates, KPRC-TV elected to carry NBC News' coverage of the debate while KNWS-TV carried NBC's final baseball game. It was also NBC's most recent MLB postseason game televised until the 2026 Wild Card Series, which the network is expected to carry until 2028 under a new three-year contract signed with the league.
- In 2001, Game 5 of the NLCS and Game 4 of the ALCS were split between Fox and Fox Sports Net. This came off the heels of Fox airing an NFL doubleheader that particular day (October 21).
- In 2002, Game 1 of the NLCS and Game 2 of the ALCS were split between Fox and Fox Sports Net. The regional split was done in order for Fox to avoid televising a weekday afternoon game.
- In 2003, Game 1 of the ALCS and Game 2 of the NLCS were split between Fox and FX.
- In 2004, Game 1 of the NLCS and Game 2 of the ALCS were split between Fox and Fox Sports Net. Also in 2004, Game 5 of the ALCS ran way into the time slot of Game 5 of the NLCS. As a result, the first seven innings of the NLCS game were shown on FX.
- In 2005, Game 1 of the NLCS and Game 1 of the ALCS were split between Fox and FX.
- Game 2 of the 2006 ALCS was originally intended to air on FX, but the NLCS game that night (originally intended to air on Fox) was rained out. FX showed the movie Any Given Sunday instead.
  - In 2006, Fox fired Steve Lyons from their baseball coverage altogether following what they saw insensitive comments made about Hispanics during the Game 3 broadcast. During Game 3, Lyons' broadcast colleague Lou Piniella, who is of Spanish descent, made an analogy involving the luck of finding a wallet, and then briefly used a couple of Spanish phrases. Lyons responded by saying that Piniella was "hablaing Espanol" -- Spanglish for "speaking Spanish"—and added, "I still can't find my wallet. I don't understand him, and I don't want to sit close to him now."
- On October 18, 2008, TBS missed most of the first inning of Game 6 of that year's American League Championship Series, with viewers getting a rerun of The Steve Harvey Show instead. TBS picked up the game just prior to the last out in the bottom of the first, with announcer Chip Caray apologizing to viewers for "technical difficulties".
- Although not an active field reporter during Fox's coverage of the 2009 ALCS, Kenny Albert still presided over the championship presentation and postgame interviews in the pennant-winning New York Yankees' clubhouse.

=== 1990s ===
Year	Network	Play-by-play	Color commentator(s)	Field reporter(s)
1999	Fox	Joe Buck	Tim McCarver and Bob Brenly	
1998	NBC	Bob Costas	Joe Morgan	Jim Gray
1997	Fox	Joe Buck	Tim McCarver and Bob Brenly	
1996	NBC	Bob Costas	Joe Morgan and Bob Uecker	Jim Gray
1995	ABC (Games 1–2)	Brent Musburger	Jim Kaat	Jack Arute
1995	NBC (Games 3–6)	Bob Costas	Bob Uecker	Jim Gray
1993	CBS (U.S.)	Greg Gumbel	Jim Kaat	Lesley Visser
1993	CTV (Canada)	Greg Gumbel	Jim Kaat	Lesley Visser
1992	CBS (U.S.)	Dick Stockton	Jim Kaat; Johnny Bench (Game 2)	Lesley Visser
1992	CTV (Canada)	Dick Stockton	Jim Kaat; Johnny Bench (Game 2)	Lesley Visser
1991	CBS (U.S.)	Dick Stockton	Jim Kaat	Lesley Visser
1991	CTV (Canada)	Dick Stockton	Jim Kaat	Lesley Visser
1990	CBS	Dick Stockton	Jim Kaat	Jim Gray

==== Notes ====
- The 1990 postseason started on a Thursday, while World Series started on a Tuesday due to the brief lockout.
- In 1991, CBS didn't come on the air for baseball for weeknight LCS telecasts until 8:30 p.m. ET. Instead, they opted to show programming such as Rescue 911 at 8 p.m. rather than a baseball pregame show.
- Throughout Game 2 of the 1992 ALCS, Jim Kaat was stricken with a bad case of laryngitis. As a result, Johnny Bench had to come over from the CBS Radio booth and finish the game with Dick Stockton as a "relief analyst." There was talk that if Kaat's laryngitis did not get better, Don Drysdale was going to replace Kaat on television for the rest of ALCS, while Bench would continue to work on CBS Radio.
  - CBS' coverage of the 1992 LCS led to conflicts with the presidential debates that year. CBS didn't cover one of the debates because Game 4 of the ALCS, went into extra innings. By the time it ended, the debate was almost over.
- The 1994 American League Championship Series was planned to air on NBC. However, those plans were scrapped when a strike caused the entire postseason to be canceled.
- The rather messy 1995 arrangement was courtesy of "The Baseball Network", which was Major League Baseball's in-house production facility. ABC and NBC (who essentially, distributed the telecasts rather than produce them by themselves like in the past) shared the same on-air graphics and even the microphone "flags" had the "Baseball Network" logo on it with the respective network logo. In addition, the first four games of both of the 1995 League Championship Series were regionally televised.

=== 1980s ===
Year	Network	Play-by-play	Color commentator(s)
1989	NBC (U.S.)	Bob Costas	Tony Kubek
1989	CTV (Canada)	Bob Costas	Tony Kubek
1988	ABC	Gary Bender	Joe Morgan and Reggie Jackson
1987	NBC	Bob Costas	Tony Kubek
1986	ABC	Al Michaels	Jim Palmer and Tim McCarver
1985	NBC (U.S.)	Bob Costas	Tony Kubek
1985	CTV (Canada)	Bob Costas	Tony Kubek
1984	ABC	Al Michaels	Howard Cosell and Jim Palmer
1983	NBC	Bob Costas	Tony Kubek
1982	ABC	Keith Jackson	Jim Palmer and Earl Weaver
1981	NBC	Joe Garagiola	Tony Kubek
1980	ABC	Al Michaels	Billy Martin and Jim Palmer

==== Notes ====
- 1983 marked the last year that the local flagship television stations for the competing teams were allowed to produce their own League Championship Series broadcasts. Bill Macatee hosted the pregame shows with analyst Don Sutton for NBC.
- Had the 1984 ALCS between the Detroit Tigers and Kansas City Royals gone the full five games (the last year that the League Championship Series was a best-of-five series), Game 5 on Sunday October 7, would have been a 1 p.m. ET time start instead of being in prime time. This would have happened because one of the presidential debates between Ronald Reagan and Walter Mondale was scheduled for that night. In return, ABC was going to broadcast the debates instead of a baseball game in prime time.
  - Al Trautwig interviewed the Detroit Tigers from their clubhouse following their pennant-clinching victory in Game 3.
- Dick Enberg was in Toronto for Games 1 and 7 of the 1985 ALCS on NBC. Enberg hosted the pregame show alongside Rick Dempsey (who was still active with Baltimore at the time). Meanwhile, Bill Macatee provided a report on Game 2 of the ALCS during the pregame of the NLCS opener.
  - CTV in Canada simulcast NBC's coverage (albeit with Canadian commercials) of the 1985 and 1989 ALCS involving the Toronto Blue Jays, and many relied on cable and antennas. Therefore, parts of Canada that were not near the US border couldn't pick up the American feeds, which is why these feeds were needed.
- On October 15, Game 6 of the 1986 NLCS ran so long (lasting for 16 innings, 5 hours, and 29 minutes), that it bumped up against the start time of Game 7 of the ALCS (also on ABC). In his last ABC assignment, Don Drysdale interviewed the winners in the Boston clubhouse following Game 7 of the 1986 ALCS.
- NBC used Don Sutton as a pre and postgame analyst for their 1987 LCS coverage. Marv Albert went back-and-forth during both 1987 LCS. He hosted the pregame for Game 1 of the NLCS with Joe Morgan from St. Louis. He then went to Minnesota the next night to host the ALCS pregame with Don Sutton. Sutton also made an appearance in the booth during Game 3 of the ALCS. Sutton talked with Bob Costas and Tony Kubek about Twins pitcher Les Straker's borderline balk in that game. Sutton later interviewed Detroit Tigers manager Sparky Anderson following their loss in Game 5.
- Then Texas Rangers manager Bobby Valentine worked as an on-the-field analyst for NBC's 1989 ALCS coverage.
  - Jimmy Cefalo hosted the pregame show for Game 4 of the 1989 ALCS as Marv Albert was away on an NFL assignment for NBC.

=== 1970s ===
Year	Network	Play-by-play	Color commentator(s)
1979	NBC	Dick Enberg	Wes Parker and Sparky Anderson
1978	ABC	Keith Jackson	Howard Cosell and Jim Palmer
1977	NBC	Jim Simpson (Game 1); Dick Enberg (Game 2); Joe Garagiola (in Kansas City)	Maury Wills (Game 1); Don Drysdale (Game 2); Tony Kubek (in Kansas City)
1976	ABC	Bob Uecker (Game 1); Keith Jackson (Games 2–5)	Howard Cosell and Reggie Jackson
1975	NBC	Curt Gowdy (in Boston); Joe Garagiola (in Oakland)	Tony Kubek (in Boston); Maury Wills (in Oakland)
1974	NBC	Curt Gowdy (in Oakland); Jim Simpson (in Baltimore)	Tony Kubek and Frank Robinson (in Oakland); Maury Wills (in Baltimore)
1973	NBC	Jim Simpson (Game 1); Curt Gowdy (in Oakland)	Maury Wills (Game 1); Tony Kubek (In Oakland)
1972	NBC	Curt Gowdy (in Oakland); Jim Simpson (in Detroit)	Tony Kubek (in Oakland); Sandy Koufax (in Detroit)
1971	NBC	Jim Simpson (Game 2); Curt Gowdy (Game 3)	Sandy Koufax (Game 2); Tony Kubek (Game 3)
1970	NBC	Jim Simpson (in Minnesota); Curt Gowdy (in Baltimore)	Sandy Koufax (in Minnesota); Tony Kubek (in Baltimore)

==== Notes ====
- In 1970, NBC televised the second games of both League Championship Series on a regional basis. Some markets got the NLCS at 1 p.m. ET along with a 4 p.m. NFL game while other markets got the ALCS at 4 p.m. along with a 1 p.m. NFL game.
- In 1971, Game 1 of the ALCS was rained out on Saturday, October 2. Due to its NFL coverage, NBC did not televise the rescheduled Game 1 the following day (they had only planned an NLCS telecast that day), but added a telecast of Game 2 on Monday, October 4 (which had been a scheduled travel day).
- NBC did not air Game 2 of the 1973 ALCS.
- Except for Game 1 in both series, all games in 1975 were regionally televised. Game 3 of both League Championship Series was aired in prime time, the first time such an occurrence happened.
- 1976 marked the first time that all LCS games were televised nationally. Keith Jackson missed Game 1 of the ALCS because he had just finished calling the Oklahoma vs. Texas college football game for ABC. Thus, Bob Uecker filled in for Jackson for Game 1. Uecker also took part in the postgame interviews for Game 5 of the 1976 ALCS, while Warner Wolf did an interview of George Brett in the Kansas City locker room.
- In 1978, Keith Jackson called an Oklahoma vs. Texas college football game for ABC on October 7, and then flew to New York, arriving just in time to call Game 4 of the ALCS that same night.

=== 1969 ===
Year	Network	Play-by-play	Color commentator
1969	NBC	Curt Gowdy (Game 1); Jim Simpson (Game 3)	Tony Kubek (Game 1); Sandy Koufax (Game 3)

==== Notes ====
- In the early years of the League Championship Series, NBC typically televised a doubleheader on the opening Saturday, followed by a single game on Sunday (because of NFL coverage). They then covered the weekday games with a 1.5 hour overlap, joining the second game in progress when the first one ended. NBC usually swapped announcer crews after Game 2.
- NBC did not air Game 2 of the 1969 ALCS.
- From 1969 to 1983, the Major League Baseball television contract allowed a local TV station in the market of each competing team to also carry the LCS games. So in 1969, for example, Orioles fans in Baltimore could choose to watch either the NBC telecast or Chuck Thompson, Bill O'Donnell and Jim Karvellas on WJZ-TV.

=== Surviving telecasts ===
For all of the League Championship Series telecasts spanning from 1969 to 1975, only Game 2 of the 1972 American League Championship Series (Oakland vs. Detroit) is known to exist. However, the copy on the trade circuit of Game 2 of the 1972 ALCS is missing the Bert Campaneris–Lerrin LaGrow brawl. There are some instances where the only brief glimpse of telecast footage of an early LCS game can be seen in a surviving newscast from that night. For instance, the last out of the 1973 National League Championship Series as described by Jim Simpson was played on that night's NBC Nightly News, but other than that, the entire game is gone. On the day the New York Mets and Baltimore Orioles wrapped up their respective League Championship Series in 1969, a feature story on the CBS Evening News showed telecast clips of the ALCS game (there's no original sound, just voiceover narration). This is all that likely remains of anything from that third game of the Orioles–Twins series. Simpson's call of the injury of Reggie Jackson during Game 5 of the 1972 ALCS is heard on the 1972 World Series film, as well as Curt Gowdy's call of the home run by Johnny Bench in Game 5 of the 1972 NLCS as well as Bob Moose throwing a wild pitch to pinch-hitter Hal McRae scoring George Foster with the winning run.

== Local television ==
As previously mentioned, from 1969 until 1983, the Major League Baseball television contract allowed a local TV station in the market of each competing team to also carry the LCS games.

=== 1970s ===
Year	Teams	Local TV	Play-by-play #1	Play-by-play #2	Play-by-play #3
1978	New York Yankees–Kansas City	WPIX-TV	Phil Rizzuto	Frank Messer	Bill White
1978	New York Yankees–Kansas City	KBMA-TV	Steve Shannon		
1977	New York Yankees–Kansas City	WPIX-TV	Phil Rizzuto	Frank Messer	Bill White
1977	New York Yankees–Kansas City	KBMA-TV	Steve Shannon		

== National radio ==
From 1969 to 1975, there was no official national radio network coverage of the League Championship Series. NBC only had the national radio rights to the All-Star Game and World Series during this period. Instead, national coverage was provided via broadcasts syndicated over ad hoc networks.

=== 2020s ===
Year	Network	Play-by-play	Color commentator(s)
2026	ESPN	Mike Couzens	Eduardo Pérez
2025	ESPN	Karl Ravech	Eduardo Pérez and Tim Kurkjian
2024	ESPN	Karl Ravech	Eduardo Pérez and Tim Kurkjian
2023	ESPN	Karl Ravech	Eduardo Pérez and Tim Kurkjian
2022	ESPN	Dan Shulman	Eduardo Pérez
2021	ESPN	Dan Shulman	Eduardo Pérez
2020	ESPN	Dan Shulman	Chris Singleton

=== 2010s ===
Year	Network	Play-by-play	Color commentator
2019	ESPN	Dan Shulman	Chris Singleton
2018	ESPN	Jon Sciambi	Jessica Mendoza
2017	ESPN	Jon Sciambi	Chris Singleton
2016	ESPN	Jon Sciambi	Chris Singleton
2015	ESPN	Dan Shulman	Aaron Boone
2014	ESPN	Jon Sciambi	Chris Singleton
2013	ESPN	Jon Sciambi	Chris Singleton
2012	ESPN	Dan Shulman	Orel Hershiser
2011	ESPN	Dan Shulman	Orel Hershiser
2010	ESPN	Jon Miller	Joe Morgan

=== 2000s ===
Year	Network	Play-by-play	Color commentator
2009	ESPN	Jon Miller	Joe Morgan
2008	ESPN	Jon Miller	Joe Morgan
2007	ESPN	Jon Miller	Joe Morgan
2006	ESPN	Jon Miller	Joe Morgan
2005	ESPN	Jon Miller	Joe Morgan
2004	ESPN	Jon Miller	Joe Morgan
2003	ESPN	Jon Miller	Joe Morgan
2002	ESPN	Jon Miller	Joe Morgan
2001	ESPN	Jon Miller	Joe Morgan
2000	ESPN	Dan Shulman	Buck Martinez

=== 1990s ===
Year	Network	Play-by-play	Color commentator
1999	ESPN	Ernie Harwell	Rick Sutcliffe
1998	ESPN	Dan Shulman	Buck Martinez
1997	CBS	John Rooney	Jeff Torborg
1996	CBS	John Rooney	Jeff Torborg
1995	CBS	John Rooney	Jeff Torborg
1993	CBS	Jim Hunter	Ernie Harwell
1992	CBS	Jim Hunter	Johnny Bench
1991	CBS	Jim Hunter	Johnny Bench
1990	CBS	Jim Hunter	Johnny Bench

==== See also ====
- List of Major League Baseball on ESPN Radio broadcasters

=== 1980s ===
Year	Network	Play-by-play	Color commentator
1989	CBS	Brent Musburger	Johnny Bench
1988	CBS	John Rooney	Johnny Bench
1987	CBS	Brent Musburger	Bill White
1986	CBS	Ernie Harwell	Curt Gowdy
1985	CBS	Ernie Harwell	Curt Gowdy
1984	CBS	Bill White	Curt Gowdy
1983	CBS	Ernie Harwell	Curt Gowdy
1982	CBS	Ernie Harwell	Denny Matthews
1981	CBS	Ernie Harwell	Curt Gowdy
1980	CBS	Ernie Harwell	Curt Gowdy

=== 1970s ===
Year	Network	Play-by-play	Color commentator(s)
1979	CBS	Ernie Harwell	Bill White
1978	CBS	Ernie Harwell	Ned Martin
1977	CBS	Ernie Harwell	Ned Martin
1976	CBS	Ernie Harwell	Ned Martin
1975	WHDH	Ned Martin	Jim Woods
1975	KEEN	Monte Moore	Bob Waller
1974	Mutual	Herb Carneal	Dick Young (Game 3); Jerome Holtzman (Game 4)
1973	WBAL	Chuck Thompson	Bill O'Donnell
1973	KEEN	Monte Moore	Jim Woods and Bill Rigney
1972	WJR	Ernie Harwell	Ray Lane
1972	KEEN	Monte Moore	Jim Woods
1971	Ad hoc	Ernie Harwell	
1970	Ad hoc	Ernie Harwell	

==== Notes ====
- 1972, 1973 and 1975 were years in which the participants' local broadcasts were syndicated.

=== 1969 ===
Year	Network	Play-by-play	Color commentator(s)
1969	Ad hoc	Buddy Blattner	Ernie Harwell

== Local radio ==
Since 1969, the non-national radio broadcasts of the American League Championship Series have been broadcast on the flagship stations and radio networks of the teams participating in the series.

=== 2000s ===
Year	Teams	Flagship station	Play-by-play #1	Play-by-play #2	Color commentator(s)
2009	New York Yankees-Los Angeles Angels	WCBS (New York Yankees)	John Sterling		Suzyn Waldman
2009	New York Yankees-Los Angeles Angels	KLAA (Los Angeles Angels)	Terry Smith		Rory Markas
2002	Minnesota-Anaheim	KLAC (Anaheim)	Rory Markas	Terry Smith	
2002	Minnesota-Anaheim	WCCO (Minnesota)	Herb Carneal (in Minnesota); John Gordon (in Anaheim)	John Gordon (in Minnesota); Dan Gladden (in Anaheim)	
2000	New York Yankees–Seattle	WABC (New York Yankees)	John Sterling	Michael Kay	
2000	New York Yankees–Seattle	KIRO (Seattle)	Dave Niehaus	Rick Rizzs	Ron Fairly

=== 1990s ===
Year	Teams	Flagship station	Play-by-play #1	Play-by-play #2	Color commentator(s)
1999	New York Yankees–Boston	WABC (New York Yankees)	John Sterling	Michael Kay	
1999	New York Yankees–Boston	WEEI (Boston)	Joe Castiglione	Jerry Trupiano	
1998	New York Yankees-Cleveland	WABC (New York Yankees)	John Sterling	Michael Kay	
1998	New York Yankees-Cleveland	WTAM (Cleveland)	Herb Score	Tom Hamilton	
1997	Cleveland–Baltimore	WKNR (Cleveland)	Herb Score	Tom Hamilton	
1997	Cleveland–Baltimore	WBAL (Baltimore)	Jim Hunter	Fred Manfra	
1996	New York Yankees-Baltimore	WABC (New York Yankees)	John Sterling	Michael Kay	
1996	New York Yankees-Baltimore	WBAL (Baltimore)	Jon Miller	Fred Manfra	
1995	Cleveland-Seattle	WKNR (Cleveland)	Herb Score	Tom Hamilton	
1995	Cleveland-Seattle	KIRO (Seattle)	Dave Niehaus	Rick Rizzs	Ron Fairly
1993	Chicago White Sox-Toronto	WMAQ (Chicago White Sox)	John Rooney	Ed Farmer	
1993	Chicago White Sox-Toronto	CJCL (Toronto)	Tom Cheek	Jerry Howarth	
1992	Toronto-Oakland	CJCL (Toronto)	Tom Cheek	Jerry Howarth	
1992	Toronto-Oakland	KSFO (Oakland)	Bill King	Lon Simmons	Ray Fosse
1991	Minnesota-Toronto	WCCO (Minnesota)	Herb Carneal	John Gordon	
1991	Minnesota-Toronto	CJCL (Toronto)	Tom Cheek	Jerry Howarth	
1990	Boston-Oakland	WRKO (Boston)	Bob Starr	Joe Castiglione	
1990	Boston-Oakland	KSFO (Oakland)	Bill King	Lon Simmons	Ray Fosse

=== 1980s ===
Year	Teams	Flagship station	Play-by-play #1	Play-by-play #2	Color commentator(s)
1989	Oakland–Toronto				
1985	Kansas City–Toronto				

=== 1970s ===
Year	Teams	Flagship station	Play-by-play #1	Play-by-play #2	Play-by-play #3	Color commentator(s)
1978	New York Yankees–Kansas City	WINS	Phil Rizzuto	Frank Messer	Bill White	Fran Healy
1978	New York Yankees–Kansas City	WIBW	Denny Matthews	Fred White		
1977	New York Yankees–Kansas City	WMCA	Phil Rizzuto	Frank Messer	Bill White	Fran Healy
1977	New York Yankees–Kansas City	WIBW	Denny Matthews	Fred White		
