= Toronto Blue Jays on Sportsnet =

Canadian television sports coverage

Toronto Blue Jays on Sportsnet, branded since 2026 as Rogers Blue Jays Baseball for sponsorship reasons, is a live telecast of Toronto Blue Jays baseball games that air on Sportsnet, Sportsnet One, or Sportsnet 360 and stream on Sportsnet+ in Canada. Starting in 2003, some games were broadcast in high definition. As of 2007, all games that air on the network are presented in high definition, and as of 2016, all home games are broadcast in ultra-high definition. Sportsnet began showing Blue Jays games in 1999 and is now their official television carrier, carrying all televised Blue Jays games throughout the regular season.

Sportsnet is also the main television outlet for Major League Baseball (MLB) in Canada. Non-Blue Jays games on Sportsnet are branded as MLB on Sportsnet.

== History ==
Sportsnet launched in October 1998 as CTV Sportsnet and began covering Blue Jays games on April 6, 1999. During the early years, Sportsnet would broadcast between 40 and 60 games. Starting in 2002, Sportsnet began broadcasting more games than TSN (The Sports Network) and took over the majority rights. Rogers Sportsnet broadcast 120 Jays games in 2003 and 2004, 103 in 2005, 122 in 2006 and 2009, 116 in 2007 and all 162 games in 2010. Games also began to air on digital channel Sportsnet One upon its launch in August 2010. Since the Blue Jays and Sportsnet are both wholly owned by Rogers Communications, Sportsnet's rights are of indefinite duration. As of the 2023 season, the only Blue Jays games not shown by Sportsnet have been those exclusive to digital platforms worldwide—specifically Friday Night Baseball on Apple TV.

Sportsnet also holds Canadian rights to Fox's Saturday MLB games, the All-Star Game, and the postseason. The Sportsnet channels also carry a variety of non-Blue Jays games simulcast from U.S. regional sports networks. Sportsnet formerly also aired ESPN's Sunday Night Baseball, but sub-licensed the games to TSN in exchange for its previous package of Blue Jays games.

On October 5, 2015, Rogers announced that it would broadcast all Blue Jays home games during the 2016 season in 4K.

Due to the structure of Rogers' MLB broadcast contracts, Sportsnet was not permitted to use its domestic production for Blue Jays games if the team is in postseason play (as it is technically still considered a regional broadcaster), and instead carried the U.S. broadcast (such as Fox in 2015, and TBS in 2016). Buck Martinez has served as a colour commentator for post-season coverage ultimately simulcast by Sportsnet, including Division Series games for TBS, and on the MLB International broadcast of the 2016 World Series.

In 2020, Sportsnet received the right to produce its own telecasts of postseason games as MLB's national Canadian broadcaster, which would allow the network to carry its "regional" production into postseason games if the Blue Jays were to advance starting in 2022 American League Wild Card Series.

The 2025 American League Championship Series between the Blue Jays and the Seattle Mariners was the first ALCS, and the 2025 World Series between the Blue Jays and the Los Angeles Dodgers was the first World Series to have a dedicated Canadian English-language television broadcast; due to MLB rules, Canadian broadcasters were previously required to simulcast the American telecast during the Blue Jays' postseason appearances (such as the Blue Jays' World Series appearances in 1992 and 1993, where CTV simulcast the CBS coverage), which faced routine criticism from Canadian viewers. Sportsnet used its own production resources, including 21 cameras and an aerial drone, to augment resources being provided by Fox Sports and MLB as part of the American production.

== Commentators ==
Blue Jays games were formerly called by Jamie Campbell on play-by-play, with former Blue Jays player Pat Tabler as analyst. In 2009, Rogers Sportsnet announced that long-time Blue Jays broadcaster Buck Martinez would replace Campbell on play-by-play beginning in the 2010 season, with Campbell becoming studio host. In September 2014, Sportsnet renewed their contracts with Martinez and Tabler through 2019.

Beginning in the 2016 season, Dan Shulman—who had most recently been the play-by-play commentator for ESPN Sunday Night Baseball—began to call play-by-play for selected games, with Martinez taking on an analyst role. Beginning in the 2020 season, the Shulman and Martinez pairing became the main broadcast team for most Blue Jays games, with Tabler taking on a reduced role that season due to COVID-19 pandemic travel restrictions. In 2023, Sportsnet declined to renew its contract with Tabler.

From the start of the 2021 season through July 2021, the television commentary was simulcast on the Toronto Blue Jays Radio Network.

Following the 2022 season, Shulman, who was not available for postseason broadcasts in 2022 due to his commitments to ESPN Radio's MLB coverage—stepped down from ESPN Radio's coverage to focus more on his role as ESPN's top college basketball commentator, thus allowing him to appear on postseason coverage for Sportsnet as lead play-by-play announcer. Shulman made his first postseason appearance on Sportsnet during the 2023 American League Wild Card Series.

In the 2024 season, Dan's son Ben Shulman—who had become the team's new radio announcer that season—also made his television debut as a substitute play-by-play announcer.

On February 6, 2026, Martinez announced his retirement from broadcasting. Joe Siddall, who has served as a studio host and alternate colour commentator, replaced Martinez full-time.

=== Current ===
- Caleb Joseph: primary studio analyst (2022–present)
- Dan Shulman: lead play-by-play (2016–present)
- Jamie Campbell: studio host (2010–present)
- Joe Siddall: lead colour commentator (2018–present)
- Hazel Mae: field reporter and alternate studio host (2015–present)
- Brad Fay: alternate studio host (2010–present)
- Matt Devlin: alternate play-by-play (2013–2014, 2016–2017, 2022–2023)
- Ben Shulman: alternate play-by-play (2024–present)

=== Past ===
- Buck Martinez: play-by-play and lead colour commentator (2010–2025)
- Alan Ashby: colour commentator (2011–2012, select games)
- Rod Black: play-by-play (1999–2000)
- Rob Faulds: play-by-play (2001–2004)
- Jamie Campbell: play-by-play (2005–2009)
- Joe Carter: colour commentator (1999–2000)
- John Cerutti: colour commentator (2001–2004)
- Tom Candiotti: colour commentator (2003, 2005, select games)
- Darrin Fletcher: colour commentator (2005–2009, select games)
- Rance Mulliniks: colour commentator (2005–2010)
- Pat Tabler: lead colour commentator (2005–2022)
- Sam Cosentino: field reporter (2007–2010)
