= Canada's Olympic Broadcast Media Consortium =

Consortium of broadcasters that aired 2010 and 2012 Olympic coverage

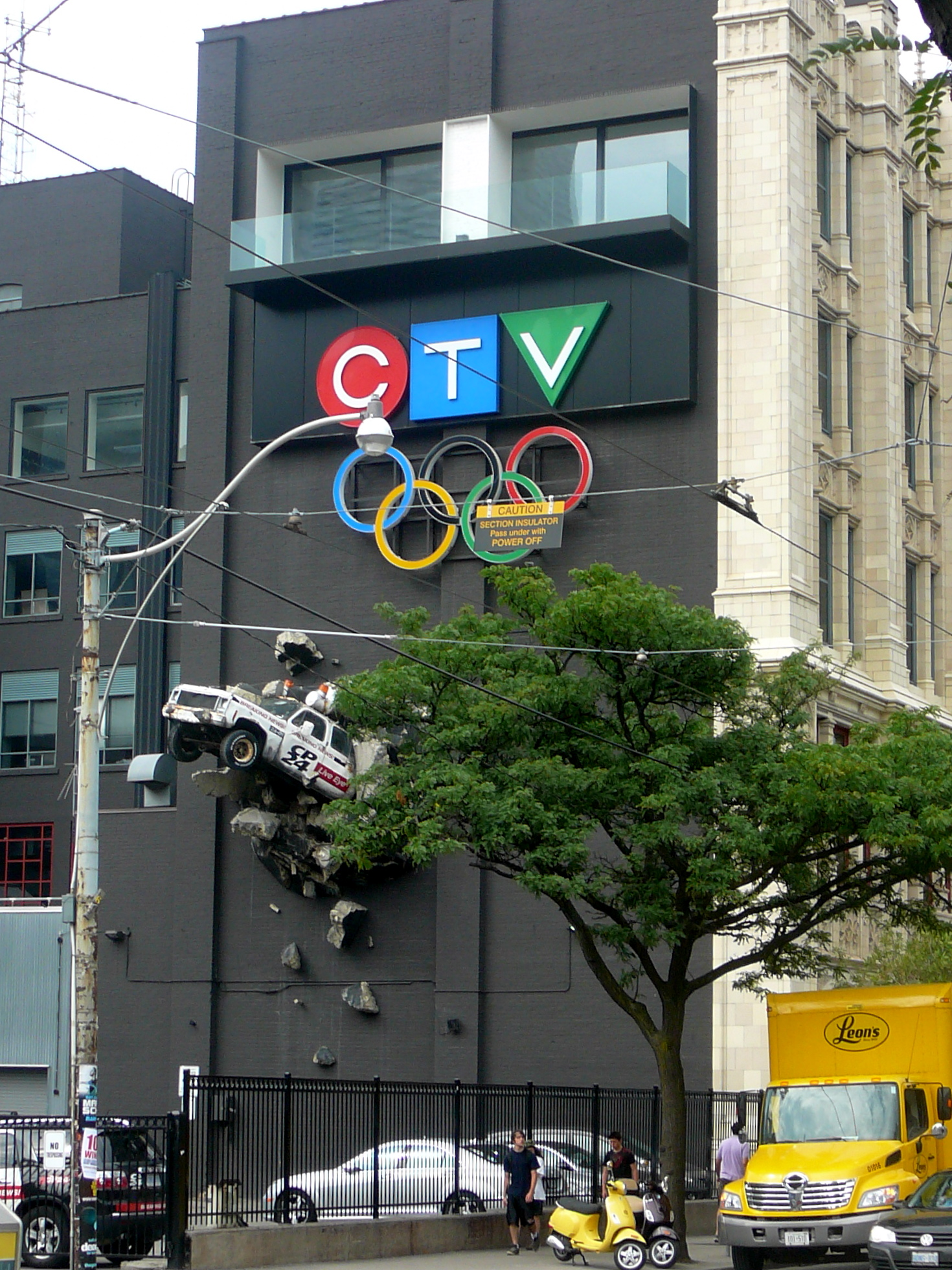
CTV's signage on 299 Queen Street West accompanied by the Olympic rings, signifying the network's role as flagship broadcaster

Established in 2007, Canada's Olympic Broadcast Media Consortium (legal name 7048467 Canada Inc., also sometimes referred to informally in branding as CTV Olympics and RDS Olympiques, additionally referred to as the National Olympic Network by BBM Canada) was a joint venture set up by Canadian media companies Bell Media (formerly CTVglobemedia) and Rogers Media to produce the Canadian broadcasts of the 2010 Winter Olympics in Vancouver, British Columbia, Canada, and the 2012 Summer Olympics in London, England, as well as the two corresponding Paralympic Games. Bell owned 80% of the joint venture, and Rogers owned 20%.

The consortium encompassed many of the properties owned by both companies, including Bell Media's CTV Television Network, TSN, RDS and RDS Info, and Rogers Media's Omni Television, Sportsnet, OLN, and the Rogers radio stations group. Several other broadcasters carried consortium coverage, including Noovo (formerly V), and several channels owned by Asian Television Network. Finally, dedicated websites in English and French (ctvolympics.ca and rdsolympiques.ca) were set up to stream live coverage over the Internet to Canadian viewers. The consortium replaced CBC Sports, which had held the Canadian rights to all Olympics beginning with the 1996 games, although some cable rights had been sub-licensed to TSN / RDS beginning in 1998.

Rogers announced in September 2011 that it would withdraw from the consortium following London 2012, and therefore not participate in its bid for rights to the 2014 Winter Olympics and 2016 Summer Olympics. The company cited scheduling conflicts and financial considerations for the decision. Bell Media then announced a new partnership with the CBC to bid for Canadian broadcasting rights of Sochi 2014 and Rio 2016. Broadcast details for the joint bid were never released. The joint Bell/CBC bid was considered the prohibitive favourite to win the rights when the International Olympic Committee accepted bids. However, the Bell/CBC bids were rejected by the IOC.

On August 1, 2012, CBC Sports announced that it had made a deal to broadcast the 2014 and 2016 Summer and Winter Olympics, replacing the Bell/Rogers group. However, in February 2013, CBC announced that both Sportsnet and TSN would sub-license broadcast rights to the 2014 Winter Olympics.

== Participating media outlets ==
=== Television ===
- Primary coverage (live coverage of major events, and highlights of all events) was carried on CTV (English) and Noovo (French), known as V in 2010.
  - As there is no full-time CTV affiliate in Newfoundland and Labrador, coverage was simulcast on Bell-owned CTV Two Atlantic, which is available on cable in Newfoundland (in other areas, CTV Two carried normal programming). During the 2010 Winter Olympics, over-the-air station NTV carried only the opening and closing ceremonies, and coverage of the men's hockey gold medal game.
  - Noovo's coverage was produced by RDS and mostly used that channel's talent, as V has no in-house production staff for news or sports. Similarly, most hosts for CTV's coverage came from TSN.
  - Since Noovo has limited coverage outside Quebec, its coverage of the 2010 games was simulcast on the Cable Public Affairs Channel (CPAC), which has mandatory carriage on all cable and satellite providers.
- Secondary coverage (full events and some highlights between events) aired primarily on TSN and Sportsnet (English), as well as RDS and RDS Info (French). Select TSN coverage was rebroadcast later on TSN2. OLN (English) also provided full-event coverage of selected outdoor events.
- Multilingual coverage on various Omni Television stations:
  - Omni.1 (Ontario) only: Italian, Polish, Portuguese, Ukrainian
  - Omni.2 (Ontario), Omni Edmonton, Omni Calgary, Omni British Columbia: Cantonese, Mandarin
  - Omni BC only: Punjabi
- Multilingual coverage on seven Asian Television Network channels:
  - ATN Bangla (Bengali)
  - ATN Gujarati (Gujarati)
  - ATN Channel (Hindi)
  - ATN Alpha ETC Punjabi and ATN MH1 (Punjabi)
  - ATN Jaya TV (Tamil)
  - ATN ARY Digital (Urdu)
- APTN provided coverage of the 2010 games in several native languages; including (Cree, Dene, Inuktitut, Mechif, Mi'kmaq, Mohawk, Ojibway and Oji-Cree). In some cases the network was split, with commentary in two or three different languages on the East, West, and North feeds. It also aired some English and French coverage as an overflow channel. APTN did not participate in coverage for the 2012 Summer Olympics.

=== Radio ===
- English-language radio coverage aired over Rogers's Sportsnet Radio Network. Ten Rogers stations, namely "Sportsnet Radio" (CJCL Toronto and CFAC Calgary), all-news or news/talk stations (CKWX Vancouver, CFTR Toronto, CFFR Calgary, CKGL Kitchener, CHNI-FM Saint John, CJNI-FM Halifax, and CKNI-FM Moncton), as well as CISQ-FM Whistler, were listed as "official" Consortium stations and typically air most if not all coverage. Portions of the coverage aired on other Rogers Media radio stations, as well as several other stations in non-competing markets (such as CTV-owned CKGM Montreal).
- French-language radio coverage of the 2010 games was aired on Cogeco radio stations, primarily airing on CKAC Montreal (then an all-sports station). No similar coverage plans were announced for the 2012 games.

=== Other affiliated outlets ===
- Several other Bell Media-owned channels, such as CTV News Channel and Discovery Channel) provided ancillary (non-event) coverage related to the games. CTV-owned music channel MuchMusic broadcast programming live from the Vancouver area throughout the 2010 games, including special editions of MuchOnDemand broadcast from Whistler.
- The Globe and Mail, a national newspaper which was owned by CTVglobemedia at the time of the Vancouver games (and is currently 15% owned by Bell Media's parent company), was listed as part of the consortium and supplied content for its websites, however its sponsorship/coverage of the games is independent of the broadcast rights.

== History ==
=== Early coverage ===
CTV has previously broadcast the Summer Games in 1976 (along with CBC) and 1992, and the Winter Games in 1964, 1968, 1972, 1976, 1980, 1984 (along with CBC), 1988 and 1994.

The 1980 "Miracle on Ice" game was aired live on CTV in Canada, but not ABC in the United States. Thus, American viewers who resided in or near the Canada–US border and received the CTV signal could watch the game live, but the rest of the United States had to wait for a delayed rebroadcast.

==== Rights fees ====
In 1974, Johnny Esaw (who anchored CTV's prime time Olympic coverage from 1964–1980) became vice-president of CTV Sports, a position he would hold until his retirement in 1990. He negotiated the host broadcasting rights to the 1988 Winter Olympics in Calgary, Alberta. As the main host broadcaster for the 1988 Winter Olympics, the CTV television network paid $4.5 million for domestic rights to the 1988 Winter Olympics. Coverage for the 1988 Winter Games was panned by critics and viewers alike, especially compared to the well-received ABC coverage despite significant resources mobilized and 118 hours of live coverage. Esaw also brought the 1964 Winter Olympics to CTV.

Production of the broadcasting for the 1994 Winter Olympics in Lillehammer, Norway, which costs NOK 462 million, was the responsibility of the Norwegian Broadcasting Corporation (NRK), with assistance from CTV and the European Broadcasting Union (EBU). NRK had 1,424 people working at the Olympics, while international broadcasters sent an additional 4,050 accredited broadcasting personnel. The transmission rights for the games were held by EBU in Europe, CBS in the United States, NHK in Japan, CTV in Canada, the Asia-Pacific Broadcasting Union, Nine Network in Australia, as well as other broadcasters in other countries. The total transmission rights price was 350 million United States dollars.

==== Commentators ====
- Rod Black anchored CTV's coverage of the 1992 Summer Olympics in Barcelona, Spain and 1994 Winter Olympics in Lillehammer, Norway.
- Don Chevrier provided television network coverage of the Olympic Games for North American audiences since 1972, working for the CBC, the American Broadcasting Company (ABC), and the CTV Television Network before moving on to NBC. More recently, he covered events at the 2004 Summer Olympics, including badminton, table tennis, and synchronized swimming for NBC, and, along with longtime partner, Don Duguid, called curling at the 2002 Winter Olympics in Salt Lake City and in the 2006 Winter Olympics in Turin for NBC.
- Rob Faulds worked on CTV's coverage of the 1992 Summer Olympics in Barcelona, Spain and the 1994 Winter Olympics in Lillehammer, Norway.
- Dan Kelly was the lead play-by-play hockey broadcaster for CTV at the 1988 Winter Olympics in Calgary.
- Dan Matheson hosted the network's coverage of the 1988 Winter Olympics in Calgary, the 1992 Summer Olympics in Barcelona, and the 1994 Winter Olympics in Lillehammer.
- Jiggs McDonald did play-by-play on CTV for Olympic basketball games in 1992.
- Greg Millen paired with Don Chevrier as the lead broadcasting team for CTV's ice hockey coverage at the 1994 Winter Olympics. The secondary team was Dan Shulman and Tom Watt.
- Bernie Pascall broadcast Gymnastics at 1976 Montreal Olympics, Hockey 1976 from Innsbruck, Austria, Hockey 1980 Lake Placid, NY including only live TV in North America of USA vs Russia, also broadcast Hockey at 1984 Games in Sarajevo, Cross Country Skiing 1988 Calgary/Canmore
- Valerie Pringle was a host of special events programming such as the network's 1993 election and 1995 Quebec referendum coverage and the 1994 Winter Olympics in Lillehammer, Norway.
- Ron Reusch covered the 1980 Winter Olympics in Lake Placid, New York (ice hockey), the 1988 Winter Olympics in Calgary, Alberta (ice hockey), the 1992 Summer Olympics in Barcelona, Spain (baseball), and the 1994 Winter Olympics in Lillehammer, Norway (speed skating).
- Frank Rigney was the colour commentator for both the CBC and CTV football broadcasts, plus covered other sports such as the 1980 Winter Olympics in Lake Placid, New York and the 1984 Winter Olympics in Sarajevo, Yugoslavia.
- Lloyd Robertson was the prime time anchor for CTV's coverage in 1984 and 1988.

=== 2010 Winter Olympics ===
CTV's logo for coverage of the 2010 Winter Olympics; on other channels, the appropriate channel logo replaces the CTV mark.

For the 2010 Winter Olympics, coverage was as follows:

==== Television ====
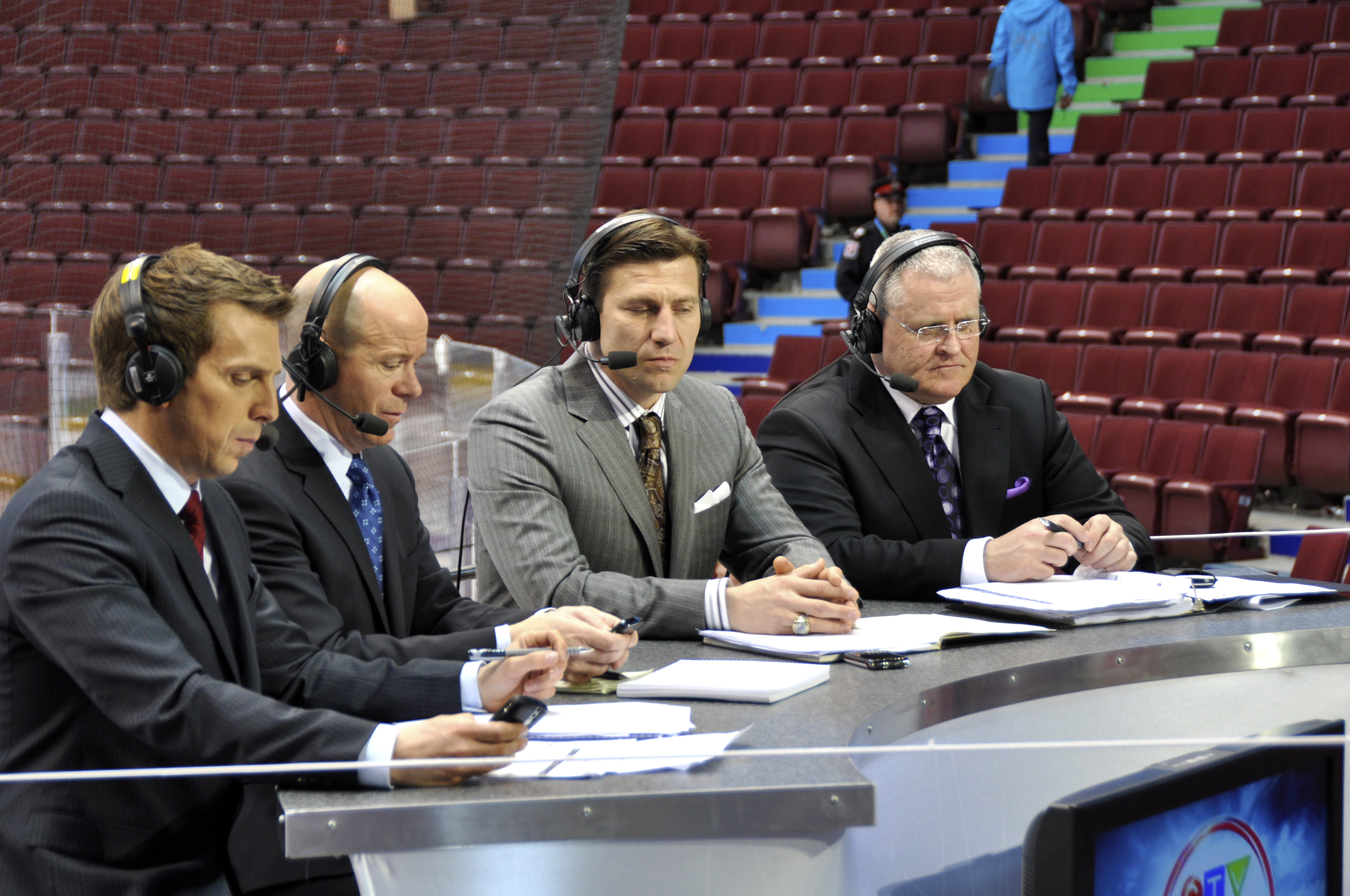
The Consortium's studio panel for men's hockey, at Canada Hockey Place (from left: James Duthie, Darren Pang, Nick Kypreos, and Bob McKenzie)

Consortium coverage originated primarily from the Vancouver Convention Centre (the International Broadcast Centre for the 2010 games) as well as Mountain Square in Whistler.

- CTV: An average of 22 hours per day of coverage, focusing on the major events and highlights. Times varied on certain days depending on events in progress
  - Olympic Morning: 3:00-9:00am PT (6:00-12:00pm ET), with Beverly Thomson, Jay Onrait, Seamus O'Regan, and Melissa Grelo
  - Olympic Daytime: 9:00am–2:30pm PT (12:00-5:30pm ET), with James Duthie, Lisa LaFlamme, and Michael Landsberg
  - Olympic Prime Time: 3:00-11:00pm PT (6:00-2:00am ET), with Brian Williams and Jennifer Hedger
  - Olympic Late Night: Midnight to 3:00am PT (3:00-6:00am ET), no host (event repeats)

The only breaks in coverage were for 30-minute local newscasts daily at 2:30 pm PT (5:30 pm ET), as well as a one-hour newscast produced by CTV British Columbia at 11:00pm PT (2:00 am ET). Two CTV National News summaries, anchored by Lloyd Robertson at CTV's main Vancouver studios, were aired nightly during Olympic Prime Time; the regular CTV National News broadcast aired solely on CTV News Channel for the duration of the games. From 3:00 – 6:00am PT (6:00 – 9:00am ET) CTV News Channel also aired a simulcast of CTV's Olympic Morning.

- Noovo (V): Major events and highlights in French, averaging 16.5 hours per day, including a morning show simulcast from RDS
- TSN and Rogers Sportsnet: Full-event coverage, averaging 18 hours per day on each channel (produced by Paul Graham)
- OLN: Full-event coverage of outdoor events, averaging 4.5 hours per day
- RDS: Full-event coverage in French, averaging 21 hours per day
- RIS: Full-event coverage in French, averaging 6 hours per day
- Omni: Multilingual coverage, averaging up to 6 hours per day (depending on location; not all coverage carried on all stations)
- ATN: Multilingual coverage, averaging 6.5 hours a day across seven channels
- APTN: Coverage in English, French, and Aboriginal languages, averaging 13 hours a day

The television broadcast was filmed with 39 new Hitachi SK-HD1000 studio/field cameras from Hitachi Kokusai Electric including on-site technical support. The cameras were also used to broadcast the 2012 Summer Olympics. Following the games, portions of CTV's set were re-purposed by its Vancouver affiliate CIVT for its newscasts.

==== Radio ====
English-language coverage was provided by the Sportsnet Radio Network, and included coverage of the opening and closing ceremonies, selected hockey games, special editions of Prime Time Sports, and various updates / programs on the games. French-language coverage, which was similar in scope, was carried by Corus Québec.

==== Broadcast team ====
Sport	Play-by-play announcer	Colour commentator	Reporter
Alpine skiing	Gerry Dobson	Brian Stemmle; Cary Mullen; Karen Percy	Perry Solkowski
Biathon	RJ Broadhead	Daniel Lefebvre	Paul Hollingsworth
Bobsleigh/Luge/ Skeleton	Rob Faulds	Chris Wightman (Luge); Chris Lori and Christina Smith (Bobsled); Duff Gibson (Skeleton)	Farhan Lalji
Cross country skiing	RJ Broadhead	Beckie Scott; Jack Sasseville	Paul Hollingsworth
Curling	Vic Rauter; Bryan Mudryk	Linda Moore; Ray Turnbull; Russ Howard; Cathy Gauthier	Dan Murphy
Figure skating	Rod Black	David Pelletier (Pairs, Men's Singles); Jamie Sale (Pairs); Elizabeth Manley and Jennifer Robinson (Ice Dance, Ladies' Singles)	Sara Orlesky
Freestyle skiing	Jamie Campbell	Veronica Brenner (Aerials, Moguls); Jeff Bean (Aerials)	Katherine Dolan
Men's ice hockey	Chris Cuthbert; Gord Miller; Peter Loubardias	Pierre McGuire; Ray Ferraro; John Garrett	Ryan Rishaug; Darren Dreger; Gene Principe
Women's ice hockey	Kevin Quinn	Cassie Campbell	Lisa Bowes
Short track	Rod Black	Susan Auch	Louis Jean
Ski jumping	RJ Broadhead	Rob Keith	Craig MacEwen
Snowboarding	Jamie Campbell	Tara Teigen	Mark Torlay
Speed skating	Rod Smith	Catriona Le May Doan	James Cybulski

===== Hockey studio =====
- James Duthie (host)
- Dave Hodge (host)
- Daren Millard (host)
- Bob McKenzie (analyst)
- Nick Kypreos (analyst)
- Darren Pang (analyst)

=== 2012 Summer Olympics ===
CTV version of the Consortium logo slated to be used for the 2012 games.

The consortium also held rights to the 2012 Summer Olympics. Coverage plans for those games were follows (see above).

==== Broadcast team ====
English broadcasters

Network	Show	Host
CTV	Olympic Prime Time	Brian Williams
CTV	Olympic Daytime	James Duthie; Jennifer Hedger
CTV	Olympic Morning	Dave Randorf; Catriona Le May Doan
Sportsnet	Olympic Prime Time	Brad Fay
Sportsnet	Olympic Daytime	Daren Millard
Sportsnet	Olympic Morning	Don Taylor
TSN	Olympic Prime Time	Darren Dutchyshen
TSN	Olympic Daytime	Michael Landsberg
TSN	Olympic Morning	Kate Beirness

Sport	Play-by-play announcer	Colour commentator	Reporter
Athletics	Gord Miller; Vic Rauter (marathon and race walk)	Dave Moorcroft, Michael Smith, and Donovan Bailey; Roger Burrows (race walk); Lisa Bentley (marathon)	Farhan Lalji
Badminton	Jim Van Horne		
Basketball	Paul Jones	Chantal Valee	
Beach Volleyball	RJ Broadhead	Mark Heese	
Boxing	Eric Smith; Jim Van Horne	Russ Anber; Kara Ro	James Brydon
Canoe/Kayak/Rowing	Rob Faulds (flat-water); Vic Rauter (whitewater)	Larry Cain and Barney Williams (flat-water); Marnie McBean (Rowing); David Ford (whitewater)	Geneviève Beauchemin
Cycling	Jamie Campbell	Curt Harnett (track); Brendan Arnold (BMX); Lesley Tomlinson (road, mountain bike)	Gene Principe
Equestrian	Bryan Mudryk	Nancy Wetmore	
Field Hockey	David Christison	Rechelle Hawkes	
Gymnastics	Rod Black	Kyle Shewfelt (artistic); Erika Leigh-Howard (rhythmic)	Katherine Dolan
Judo	Bryan Mudryk	Frazer Will	James Brydon
Soccer	Gerry Dobson; Luke Wileman	Jason de Vos; Craig Forrest; Kara Lang	Sheri Forde
Swimming/Diving	Rod Smith	Joanne Malar; Blythe Hartley (diving); Lisa Bentley	Perry Solkowski
Synchronized Swimming	Rod Smith	Carolyn Waldo	Perry Solkowski
Taekwondo	Bryan Mudryk		James Brydon
Tennis	Jim Van Horne	Stephen Warboys	
Triathlon	Paul Romanuk	Barrie Shepley	Dave Naylor
Volleyball	Kevin Quinn	Emily Cordonier	
Water Polo	Gerry Dobson	George Gross Jr.	
Weightlifting	Paul Romanuk		
Wrestling	Vic Rauter	Christine Nordhagen	James Brydon

French broadcasters

Network	Show	Host
RDS	Olympic Prime Time	Chantal Machabée
RDS	Olympic Daytime	Alain Crête
RDS	Olympic Morning	Claude Mailhot
RDS	Opening Ceremonies, Collaborator	Alexandre Bilodeau
RDS	Special Reporter	Nathalie Lambert
Noovo	Olympic Prime Time	Jean Pagé
Noovo	Olympic Daytime	Frédéric Plante
Noovo	Olympic Morning	Yanick Bouchard

Sport	Play-by-play announcer	Color commentator
Athletics	Pierre Houde	Richard Garneau; Jean-Paul Baert; Bruny Surin
Canoe/Kayak/Rowing	David Arsenault	Maxime Boilard (Canoe/Kayak); Daniel Aucoin (Rowing)
Diving	Félix Séguin	Annie Pelletier
Gymnastics	Claudine Douville	Bernard Petiot
Soccer	Jean Gounelle	Patrick Leduc
Swimming	Denis Casavant	Yannick Lupien
Synchronized Swimming	Claudine Douville	Marie-Pierre Gagné
Tennis	Yvan Ponton	Hélène Pelletier
Water Polo	Michel Y. Lacroix	Ann Dow
Women's Soccer	Claudine Douville	Patrick Leduc

== Other rights ==
=== Paralympic Games ===
The consortium also owned rights to the corresponding Paralympic Games, namely the 2010 Winter Paralympics and the 2012 Summer Paralympics.

Coverage for the 2010 games consisted primarily of coverage of the opening ceremonies (live on CTV British Columbia, and on tape delay on the rest of the CTV network and RIS); daily highlights packages split among CTV, TSN and Sportsnet in English (and RDS / RIS in French); and live coverage of all sledge hockey games featuring the Canadian team. Although not originally scheduled, CTV and RDS later added live coverage of the closing ceremonies.

Coverage for the 2012 games offered no live television coverage and consisted primarily of 10 late night highlight shows carried on TSN2, Sportsnet One, and RDS2, though rebroadcasts of the opening ceremony were carried on both CTV and Rogers-owned broadcast network Citytv.

==== Criticism of Paralympic Games coverage ====
===== 2010 Winter Paralympics opening and closing ceremonies =====
Originally, CTV did not plan to air the opening ceremony live. After receiving criticism on the decision, CTV changed its mind and decided to air the ceremony live in Vancouver region. CTV originally continued to stick to its initial plan of not airing the closing ceremony live. This decision led to more complaints and CTV relented by airing the closing ceremony live across Canada.

===== 2012 Summer Paralympics =====
Despite the 2012 Summer Paralympics being a breakthrough games for international media coverage, giving a significant boost to the overall audience shares of British broadcaster Channel 4 and Australia's ABC, no Paralympics sports events were shown live on television in Canada or the United States. "Based on the level of overall coverage, it's clear that Canadian broadcasters do not deem disability to be important. They are not supporters of inclusion", SCI BC (BC Paraplegic Association) Executive Director Chris McBride said, contrasting Canada's coverage with Britain's. More than 1,000 people signed a petition calling for Canadian broadcasters to provide full Paralympics coverage at future Games. International Paralympic Committee President Philip Craven criticised North American broadcasters for having fallen behind and said in future the International Paralympic Committee would scrutinize broadcast partners more carefully. "If the values fit, we've got a chance. If they don't we'll go somewhere else", he said.

=== Youth Olympics ===
Finally, the consortium owned broadcast rights to the first Youth Olympic Games, the 2010 Summer Youth Olympics in Singapore. Coverage of those games was limited to a one-hour daily highlights package on Sportsnet and TSN2 (rebroadcast several weeks later on TSN).

== See also ==
- Olympics on CBC
- List of 2010 Winter Olympics broadcasters
- List of 2012 Summer Olympics broadcasters
- Japan Consortium
- Television Pool of Thailand
