= List of most watched Canadian television broadcasts of 2010 =

The following is a list of most watched Canadian television broadcasts of 2010 (single-network only) (Note: Except broadcasts related to the 2010 Winter Olympics.) according to BBM Canada.

== Most watched by week ==
English (national)
Week of	Title	Network	Viewers (in millions)	Ref.
January 4	2010 World Junior Ice Hockey Championships (Gold medal game)	TSN	5.27	
January 11	American Idol (Tues)	CTV	3.17	
January 18	American Idol (Wed)	CTV	3.19	
January 25	American Idol (Tues)	CTV	3.16	
February 1	Super Bowl XLIV	CTV	6.02	
February 8	2010 Winter Olympics opening ceremony	CTV Olympics	13.28	
February 15	Olympic Prime Time	CTV Olympics	5.46	
February 22	2010 Winter Olympics (Men's ice hockey – Canada vs. USA gold medal game)	CTV Olympics	16.64	
March 1	82nd Academy Awards	CTV	5.89	
March 8	House	Global	2.87	
March 15	House	Global	2.64	
March 22	American Idol (Tues)	CTV	2.90	
March 29	Survivor	Global	2.64	
April 5	Survivor	Global	2.91	
April 12	Survivor	Global	2.94	
April 19	Survivor	Global	2.78	
April 26	Survivor	Global	2.86	
May 3	Survivor	Global	2.80	
May 10	2010 Stanley Cup playoffs (Conference semifinals)	CBC	3.25	
May 17	Grey's Anatomy	CTV	3.01	
May 24	American Idol (Wed)	CTV	3.33	
May 31	2010 Stanley Cup Finals (Games 1–5)	CBC	2.88	
June 7	2010 Stanley Cup Finals (Game 6)	CBC	4.08	
June 14	America's Got Talent	Citytv	1.59	
June 21	2010 FIFA World Cup	CBC	1.97	
June 28	2010 FIFA World Cup	CBC	1.89	
July 5	2010 FIFA World Cup	CBC	5.13	
July 12	Big Brother (Sun)	Global	1.87	
July 19	Rookie Blue	Global	1.81	
July 26	Big Brother (Thurs)	Global	1.70	
August 2	Big Brother (Thurs)	Global	1.87	
August 9	Big Brother (Sun)	Global	1.93	
August 16	Big Brother (Wed)	Global	1.93	
August 23	62nd Primetime Emmy Awards	CTV	2.43	
August 30	Big Brother (Wed)	Global	1.97	
September 6	Big Brother (Thurs)	Global	1.84	
September 13	Survivor	Global	2.59	
September 20	The Big Bang Theory	CTV	3.11	
September 27	The Big Bang Theory	CTV	2.96	
October 4	The Big Bang Theory	CTV	2.69	
October 11	The Amazing Race	CTV	2.99	
October 18	The Big Bang Theory	CTV	3.03	
October 25	The Big Bang Theory	CTV	3.20	
November 1	The Big Bang Theory	CTV	3.41	
November 8	The Big Bang Theory	CTV	3.30	
November 15	The Big Bang Theory	CTV	3.25	
November 22	98th Grey Cup	TSN	4.94	
November 29	The Amazing Race	CTV	2.68	
December 6	The Amazing Race	CTV	2.74	
December 13	The Big Bang Theory	CTV	3.02	
December 20	2011 World Junior Ice Hockey Championships (Preliminary round; Russia vs. Canada)	TSN	2.94	
December 27	2011 World Junior Ice Hockey Championships (Quarterfinals; Canada vs. Switzerland)	TSN	2.69	
