= Sportsnet Central =

Canadian sports news program

- Also known as: Sportscentral (original title; 1998–2002); Sportsnetnews (2002–2007); Sportsnet Connected (2007–2014)
- Country of origin: Canada
- Original language: English

Production
- Production locations: 1 Mount Pleasant Road, Toronto, Ontario, Canada
- Camera setup: Multi-camera
- Running time: 30-60 minutes

Original release
- Network: Sportsnet
- Release: October 9, 1998 – present

Sportsnet Central is the flagship sports news program on Sportsnet in Canada. Originally known as Sportscentral and later Sportsnetnews, it was re-branded as Sportsnet Connected on January 1, 2007 with an emphasis on more local coverage of sports teams. Additionally, Rogers-owned Setanta Sports (now Sportsnet World) aired a version of the show called Setanta Connected (later Sportsnet World Connected), with an emphasis on international sports, although that was replaced with Soccer Central. Sportsnet Connected changed the look and format of its show on October 4, 2011. The title of the program was again renamed on October 8, 2014 as Sportsnet Central to coincide with the beginning of the 2014–15 NHL regular season.

== Current Sportsnet Central anchors ==
- Jesse Fuchs
- Tony Brar
- Martine Gaillard
- Faizal Khamisa
- Tim Micallef
- Danielle Michaud
- Evanka Osmak
- Ken Reid

== Former Sportsnet Central anchors ==
- Carly Agro
- R.J. Broadhead
- Hugh Burrill
- Caroline Cameron
- James Cybulski
- Daru Dhillon
- Brendan Dunlop
- Ben Ennis
- Rob Faulds
- Brad Fay
- Erin Hawksworth
- Hazel Mae
- Daren Millard
- Jackie Redmond
- Jesse Rubinoff
- Don Taylor
- Eric Thomas
- Jamie Thomas
- Mike Toth
