= Gene Principe =

Canadian sports reporter and broadcaster (born 1967)

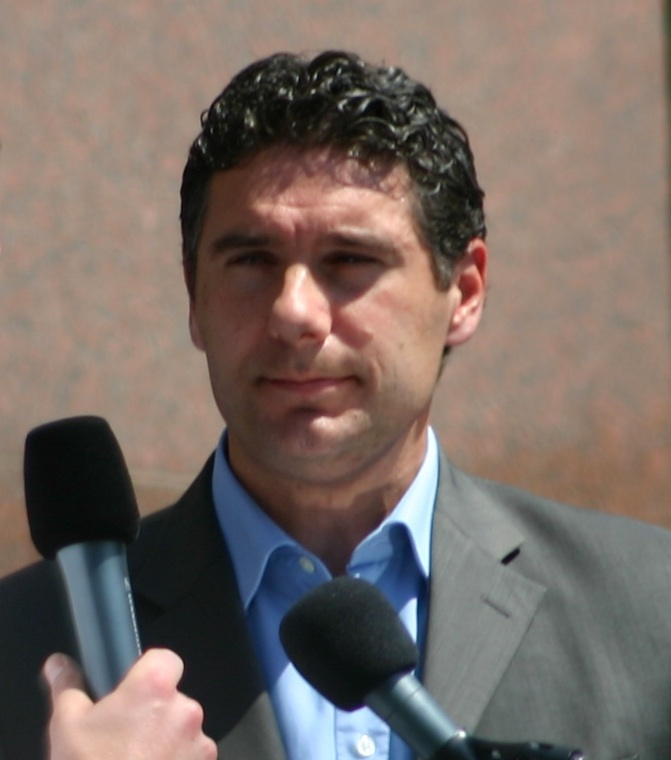
- Principe in 2006
- Born: February 26, 1967 (age 59); Edmonton, Alberta, Canada
- Occupations: Sports reporter; broadcaster
- Spouse: Karen Poganiatz
- Children: 3
- Sports commentary career
- Team: Edmonton Oilers
- Genres: Host; reporter
- Sport: National Hockey League
- Employer: Sportsnet

Eugenio Principe (born February 26, 1967) is a Canadian sports reporter and broadcaster, who is the current host of Edmonton Oilers broadcasts on Sportsnet. He is best known for his frequent use of puns and props during his pre-game segments.

Born in Edmonton to Italian immigrants, Principe began his broadcasting career in 1987 and became a full-time sportscaster in 1990. He anchored various sports programs in Winnipeg and Toronto before returning to Edmonton in 1998 to host Oilers broadcasts for CKEM-TV (then known as A-Channel). Principe continued to host Oilers games after joining Sportsnet in 2001.

== Early life and career ==
Principe was born in Edmonton to Gina and Franco Principe, who were immigrants from Italy. His mother Gina was a seamstress, while his father Franco was a carpenter. Principe attended Austin O'Brien Catholic High School and became interested in sports broadcasting as a teenager. This led him to study broadcasting for two years at the Northern Alberta Institute of Technology (NAIT) before graduating in 1987.

Principe began his first work placement at CFJC-TV in Kamloops, later moving to Grande Prairie to work as a videographer for CFRN-TV. After a year and a half in Grande Prairie, he became a reporter for CFCN-TV in Lethbridge, eventually transitioning to a full-time sports reporter in the summer of 1990.

Principe later moved to Global-owned CKND-TV in Winnipeg, spending three years as host of the station's Winnipeg Jets broadcasts and the co-anchor of Sportsline, a half-hour sports show. In 1995, he was hired by Global to work for CIII-TV in Toronto, where he continued to host Sportsline. Given the opportunity to cover his hometown team, Principe returned to Edmonton in August 1998 to become the host of CKEM-TV's Edmonton Oilers broadcasts, as well as its evening sports show.

== Work with Sportsnet ==
Principe joined Sportsnet in October 2001, as the host of the network's Edmonton Oilers broadcasts. In March 2002, he called his first two National Hockey League games as a play-by-play announcer when he filled in for regular announcer Kevin Quinn. Principe travelled to Dubai in 2005 to film a documentary covering the Dubai Mighty Camels of the Emirates Ice Hockey League.

During the 2006 Stanley Cup playoffs, Principe was scheduled to cover only the first round matchup between the Oilers and the Detroit Red Wings, before leaving for the 2006 FIFA World Cup in Germany, since the Oilers were unlikely to advance. However, after the Oilers won the series, he was held back to cover the second round. When the Oilers advanced to the third round, Principe was given a choice of staying to cover the Oilers, which he was already "pretty entrenched in" and where "fellow Italian Fernando Pisani was lighting it up", or fly to Germany to cover the World Cup, which was a "pure dream", especially with the Italy national team in contention for the cup and his wife being German. He ultimately left the decision to Sportsnet, who had him stay in Edmonton. The Oilers ended up losing the 2006 Stanley Cup Finals, while the Italian team won the World Cup.

During the 2010 Winter Olympics, he covered men's hockey for Canada's Olympic Broadcast Media Consortium.

=== Use of puns ===
As a host of Oilers broadcasts, Principe is well known for his use of puns and skits during his pre-game segments. According to Principe, he was inspired by fellow broadcaster Ron MacLean, and began using puns as a way to uplift fans during the 2006–07 NHL season. The season followed the Oilers' defeat in the 2006 Stanley Cup Finals, and included a stretch where the Oilers had won only two of their last 20 games. His segments were well received by fans and colleagues, which encouraged him to continue his unique pre-game segments in subsequent seasons.

On October 30, 2011, Principe began one of his segments dressed as a hot dog, saying that he "[felt] like such a wiener" for accidentally dressing up a day before Halloween. He wore the costume for the rest of the game, including during an interview with Oilers assistant coach Kelly Buchberger, where Principe said "[t]his may be the first time in history a hot dog has interviewed a burger." In December 2015, Principe introduced Oilers head coach Todd McLellan as the "Toddfather" in a pre-game segment while doing an impression of Vito Corleone from The Godfather film and accompanied by a trumpet player performing "Love Theme from The Godfather". He later described the segment as one of his favorites because "it was a team effort" and "had the most elements to it".

In January 2017, one of his segments had him wearing a Donald Trump mask and making various Trump-related puns during a broadcast that coincided with Trump's inauguration. That same year, during a pre-game commemoration of the Edmonton Police Service's 125th anniversary, Principe made several police-related puns, before being handcuffed by an officer, who informed him that he had exceeded the "legal limit for puns" and was being sent to the "pun-itentiary".

== Personal life ==
Principe is married to Karen Principe (née Poganiatz), who he met during his time in Winnipeg; together they have three children. A former dental hygienist, Karen Principe was elected to Edmonton City Council as the councillor for Ward tastawiyiniwak in 2021.
