= List of 2010 Winter Olympics broadcasters =

Broadcast coverage of the 2010 Winter Olympics aired on the radio and television services listed below.

== Broadcasters ==
Within the host Vancouver-Whistler area, coverage was available on CIVT-TV (CTV), KING-TV (NBC), CHNM-TV (Omni), and most of the Canadian cable channels listed in the below table.

Nation	Primary rightsholder(s)	Broadcasters	HDTV	Ref.
Albania	TVSH	Free-to-air television broadcast: TVSH		
Argentina	TyC Sports			
Armenia	ARMTV	Free-to-air television broadcast: ARM TV		
Australia	Nine Network; Foxtel	Free-to-air television broadcast: Nine Network; Cable and satellite television broadcast: Foxtel: Whistler SD: Channel 188; Creekside SD: Channel 189; Vancouver SD: Channel 190; Cypress SD: Channel 191	Free-to-air television broadcast: Nine HD; Cable and satellite television broadcast: Foxtel HD+: one Channel for each venue: Whistler HD: Channel 196; Creekside HD: Channel 197; Vancouver HD: Channel 198; Cypress HD: Channel 199	
Austria	ORF	ORF1	ORF1 HD	
Azerbaijan	İTV	Free-to-air television broadcast: iTV		
Belarus	BTRC	Free-to-air television broadcast: First National Channel; LAD; NTV Belarus		
Belgium	VRT; RTBF; Euro1080	Free-to-air television broadcast: één één+ Canvas; La Une; La Deux; Cable and satellite television broadcast: Exqi Plus; Exqi Sport		
Bosnia and Herzegovina	BHT	Free-to-air television broadcast: BHT1		
Brazil	Rede Record; Globosat; Terra Networks	Free-to-air television broadcast: Rede Record; Record News; Cable and satellite television broadcast: SporTV; Internet rights: Terra Networks	Free-to-air television broadcast: Rede Record; Cable and satellite television broadcast: SporTV HD	
Bulgaria	BNT	Free-to-air television broadcast: BNT 1		
Canada	CTV Olympics (CTVglobemedia / Rogers Media)	Free-to-air television: CTV (mirrored on A Atlantic); V (mirrored on CPAC); Omni; Cable and satellite television: TSN; RDS; Rogers Sportsnet; OLN; RIS; APTN; ATN; Radio: Selected Rogers Media stations including news/talk stations (such as CKWX), The FAN (CJCL / CFAC), CISQ, CITI; Selected Corus Québec stations, primarily CKAC	Free-to-air television: CTV HD; V HD; Omni HD; Cable and satellite television: TSN HD; RDS HD; Rogers Sportsnet HD; APTN HD	
Chile	Canal 13; Televisión Nacional de Chile	Free-to-air television broadcast: Canal 13; Televisión Nacional de Chile		
China	CCTV	CCTV-5	CCTV-HD	
Croatia	HRT	Free-to-air television broadcast: HRT2		
Czech Republic	Czech Television	Free-to-air television broadcast: ČT2; ČT4	ČT HD	
Denmark	DR; TV2	Free-to-air television broadcast: DR1; DR2; TV 2 Cable and satellite television: TV 2 Zulu	DR HD	
Estonia	ETV	Free-to-air television broadcast: ETV; ETV2		
Europe	Eurosport	Eurosport	Eurosport HD	
Finland	YLE	Free-to-air television broadcast: YLE TV2 (Finnish); YLE FST5 (Swedish)	Canal Digital satellite broadcast and selected cable networks: YLE HD	
France	France Télévisions	France 2 France 3 France 4	France 2 HD	
Germany	ARD; ZDF	Free-to-air television broadcast: Das Erste; ZDF; EinsFestival; ZDFinfokanal	Das Erste HD; ZDF HD	
Greece	ERT	ET1		
Greenland	KNR			
Hong Kong	Cable TV			
Hungary	MTV	Free-to-air television broadcast: MTV1; MTV2	m2 HD	
Iran	IRIB	Free-to-air television broadcast: IRIB TV1; IRIB TV3		
Italy	RAI; Sky Italia	Free-to-air television broadcast: Rai Due; Rai Tre; Rai Sport Più; Cable and satellite television broadcast: SKY Olimpia 1 (Alpine skiing); SKY Olimpia 2 (Nordic skiing); SKY Olimpia 3 (Ice skating); SKY Olimpia 4 (Ice hockey); SKY Olimpia 5	Free-to-air television broadcast: Rai Test HD; Cable and satellite television broadcast: SKY Olimpia 1 HD; SKY Olimpia 2 HD; SKY Olimpia 3 HD; SKY Olimpia 4 HD; SKY Olimpia 5 HD	
Japan	NHK; Fuji TV; NTV			
Kazakhstan	Arna Media	Free-to-air television broadcast: Khabar; El Arna		
Latvia	LTV	Free-to-air television broadcast: LTV1; LTV7		
Lithuania	LRT	Free-to-air television broadcast: LRT; LRT2		
Mexico	XEIMT-TDT; TV Nuevo León			
Netherlands	NOS	Free-to-air television broadcast: Nederland 1	Nederland 1 HD	
New Zealand	SKY Network Television	Free-to-air television broadcast: Prime; Cable and satellite television broadcast: SKY Sport: SKY Sport 4; SKY Sport 5; SKY Sport 6; SKY Sport 7		
Norway	NRK	Free-to-air television broadcast: NRK1; NRK2	Free-to-air television broadcast: NRK1 HD	
Philippines	Solar Entertainment	Free-to-air television broadcast: Solar TV; Cable and satellite television: Solar Sports		
Poland	TVP	Free-to-air television broadcast: TVP1; TVP2; Cable and satellite television: TVP Sport	TVP HD	
Portugal	RTP	Free-to-air television broadcast: RTP2		
Romania	TVR	Free-to-air television broadcast: TVR1; TVR2	TVR HD	
Russia	Channel One; VGTRK	Free-to-air television broadcast: Channel One; Russia 1 Russia 2	2 Sport 2	
Serbia	RTS	RTS 2		
Slovakia	STV	Jednotka; Dvojka; Trojka	Trojka HD	
Slovenia	RTV	Free-to-air television broadcast: SLO2	Free-to-air television broadcast: SLO HD	
South Korea	SBS	Free-to-air television broadcast: SBS; Cable and satellite television broadcast: SBS Sports; SBS Golf; SBS-CNBC	Free-to-air television broadcast: SBS HD	
Spain	TVE	TVE1; TVE2; Teledeporte	TVE HD	
Sweden	SVT	Free-to-air television broadcast: SVT1; SVT2; SVT24; SVT Educational Broadcasting; Online: SVT Play; Worldwide: SVT World; Radio: Radiosporten SR P3; Radiosporten SR P4	SVT HD	
Switzerland	SRG SSR idée suisse	SF zwei (German); TSR 2 (French); RSI La 2 (Italian)	HD suisse	
Turkey	TRT	TRT 3		
Ukraine	NTU	UT-1		
United Kingdom	BBC	BBC Two; BBC Three; British Eurosport; Radio: BBC Radio 5 Live; BBC Radio 5 Live Sports Extra	BBC HD; Eurosport HD	
United States	NBC Universal	Free-to-air television broadcast: NBC; Universal Sports; Telemundo; Cable and satellite television broadcast: USA Network; CNBC; MSNBC; Radio: Westwood One	NBC HD; MSNBC HD; CNBC HD; USA HD; Universal HD	
Vietnam	VTC; Hồ Chí Minh Television; Vietnam Television	VTC3, HTV1, HTV9, HTV7, HTV THỂ THAO, VTV2, VTV3, VTV6		
