= Chantal Machabée =

Canadian sports journalist (born 1964)

- Born: September 4, 1964 (age 62); Laval, Quebec, Canada
- Education: Collège Saint-Laurent; University of Montreal
- Occupations: Sports journalist, TV host,Vice President of Communications for the Montreal Canadiens
- Years active: 1985–present
- Children: 2

Chantal Machabée (born September 4, 1964) is a Canadian sports journalist, television presenter, and the current vice president of communication for the Montreal Canadiens. At 24 years old, she made history as the first woman to anchor a daily sports newscast in Quebec.

She spent over 32 years at Réseau des Sports (RDS) as a sports reporter, covering Quebec sports, including the Canadiens' daily activities. During this time, she became the first woman to host Montreal Canadiens hockey broadcasts on RDS.

== Early life and education ==
Chantal was born on September 4, 1964, in Laval, Quebec, at 12 Place Chopin in the Duvernay neighborhood. Her late father, André, and her mother, Huguette Lapierre, both worked in the perfume and cosmetics industry. Her sister, Manon, is the owner of a pet supply store.

Chantal once stated that she aspired to become a sports journalist for Le Journal de Montréal. However, her father, André, encouraged her to pursue political journalism instead, believing there were limited opportunities for women in sports journalism at the time. Interestingly, her parents were not avid sports fans. In her youth, her father would often take her to listen to speeches by René Lévesque, a man she greatly admired.

Hockey legend Guy Lafleur inspired Chantal's passion for sports at a young age through his performances on the ice during the 1970s.

As a child, she would often say she would one day take Lionel Duval’s place. He was her role model, and she dreamed of the day she’d conduct intermission interviews during National Hockey League games.

From 1981 to 1983, she studied literature at Collège Saint-Laurent.

At 17, she volunteered as a statistician for the Patriotes football team at Cégep de Saint-Laurent while also working as a sports journalist for the Ville St-Laurent weekly, Les Nouvelles/The News, and the now-defunct Dimanche-Matin.

From 1983 to 1985, she studied political science at the University of Montreal.

== Career ==
Throughout her career, which began in 1985, she has achieved numerous firsts for women in sports broadcasting in the province of Quebec and significantly contributed to the advancement of women in sports media.

In 1985, she wrote for La Presse canadienne and worked as a sports reporter for the NTR radio network, notably on the show Sportivement vôtre at CKSH (AM), hosted by Gilles Péloquin.

In the fall of 1985, she co-hosted the music show Graffiti at Much Music with Marc Carpentier, broadcast on TVJQ.

In 1986, she covered the Memorial Cup in Seattle, where a pivotal career encounter took place. “Denis Ricard from CBC appreciated my work and arranged a screen test for me.” She was subsequently assigned to cover the Canadian Football League and junior hockey.

Later in 1986, she joined the TVA network in Quebec City, where she was assigned to cover the Nordiques and host the show Ça, c'est du sport!

In 1988, she came back to Montreal to become a sports anchor, reporter, and writer at TVA.

In 1989, at only 24 years old, Machabée made history as the first woman to anchor a daily sports newscast in Quebec by hosting the premiere episode of Sports 30 on RDS.

On September 1, 1989, she hosted the very first episode of Sport 30 alongside Serge Deslongchamps, marking the network’s debut broadcast.

In 2004, Chantal became the first woman to host the Montreal Canadiens’ hockey broadcasts on RDS, which she co-hosted with her good friend Jacques Demers.

She worked as the daytime anchor for V Network during its coverage of the 2010 Vancouver Olympics and participated in the Olympic torch relay, carrying the flame in Les Rivières, Quebec.

In 2011, Chantal and a few of her colleagues from RDS traveled to Kandahar, Afghanistan, to meet Canadian soldiers and produce television reports.

In 2012, she was part of Canada's Olympic Broadcast Media Consortium for the London Olympics on RDS.

Before returning to covering the daily activities of the Montreal Canadiens in 2012, she spent nearly 20 years as the anchor for the Sports 30 news bulletin. She was also the host and panelist on the sports talk show L'Antichambre.

In 2022, she became Vice President of Communications for the Montreal Canadiens, succeeding Paul Wilson, who was dismissed on November 28, 2021.

== Awards and honors ==
In 1998, she and her colleagues Claude Mailhot, Charles Perreault ,Guy Bertrand, Michel Lacroix received a Gémeaux Award for the best Sports Newscast

In 2023, she was awarded the Larry Fredericks Media Award.

In 2024, Machabée received the National Assembly’s Medal of Honour

== Filmography ==
=== Television ===
- Un gars, une fille S9.E1: L'électrocardiogramme (January 4, 2024)
- En direct de l'univers

=== Documentary ===
- The Rebuild: Inside the Montreal Canadiens (2024)
- Bob Bissonnette: Rockstar. Pis pas à peu près (2019)

== Bibliography ==
In 2018, her biography titled Chantal Machabée—Désavantage numérique, written by one of her former colleagues Guillaume Lefrançois, was published.

== Personal life ==
Chantal Machabée has two children with her ex-husband: Simon, a firefighter in Terrebonne, and Hugo, who works in Mascouche.

She got divorced in 2010 and was publicly linked to Denis Jones in 2014 when the two appeared together at the premiere of François Morency: Furieusement Calme. Their relationship lasted a few months.

She once co-owned a restaurant, Le Bistro St-Pierre, in Old Terrebonne with her ex-husband and friends.
