= Rod Black =

Canadian sportscaster

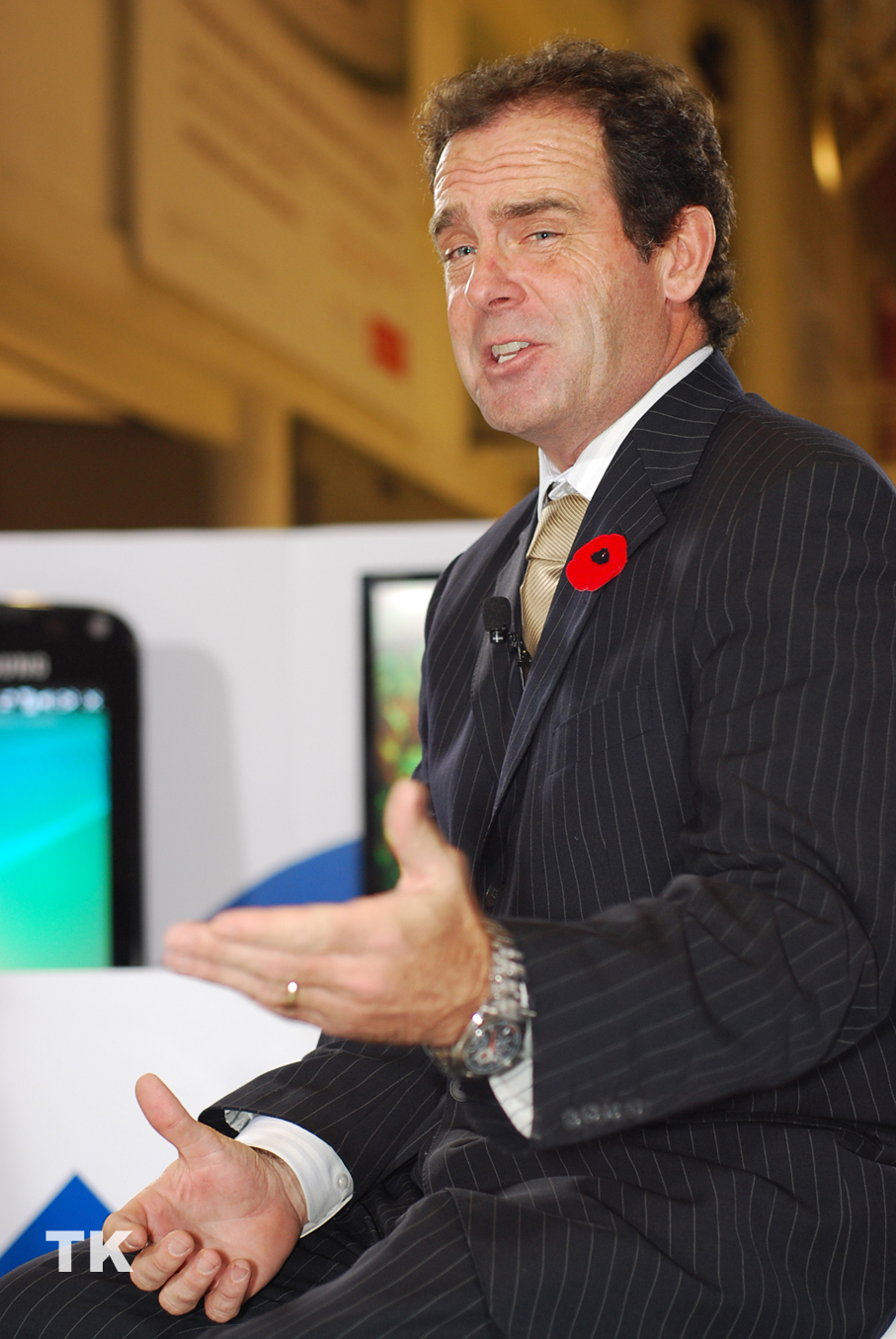
- Black in 2009
- Born: September 28, 1962 (age 64); Winnipeg, Manitoba, Canada
- Occupation: Canadian sports announcer
- Known for: CTV and TSN
- Children: Tyler

Rod Black (born September 28, 1962) is a Canadian sports announcer best known for his work with CTV Sports and TSN from 1990 to 2021. He is now a host and brand ambassador for NorthStar Bets, a brand of NorthStar Gaming.

== Education ==
Black was born in Winnipeg, Manitoba. Prior to coming onto the national scene, Black studied Creative Communications at Red River College.

== Career ==
Black got his start as a sports announcer at the age of 19 at the local CTV affiliate (now owned station) CKY-TV where he soon became host of the Winnipeg Jets’ NHL broadcasts and anchored sports for the local newscast.

By 1990, Black moved to the network's Toronto-based CTV Sports division. There, he anchored events including CTV's coverage of the 1991 Canada Cup. He worked CTV's coverage of the 1992 Summer Olympics and 1994 Winter Olympics, as well as the CTV-led consortium's coverage of the 2010 Winter Olympics and the 2012 Summer Olympics. He also called events for CTV Sportsnet from its launch in 1999 until CTV's acquisition of TSN, and sale of Sportsnet to Rogers, in 2001.

After being reassigned to TSN, Black's broadcasting duties included play-by-play announcing for the CFL on TSN and NBA on TSN, TSN golf coverage and international hockey. He has also called Canadian-based golf tournaments for the PGA Tour, bowling tournaments, curling, and boxing. He was known as the voice of figure skating in Canada, as he covered the sport as commentator for CTV and TSN coverage of figure skating.

In April 2002, Black guest starred on the Canadian animated series D'Myna Leagues as Rod Blackbird, a documentary filmmaker.

In addition to his sports roles, Black briefly served as a co-host of Canada AM, and in that capacity broke the news of the terrorist attacks on the United States to CTV viewers on September 11, 2001.

Black announced his departure from CTV/TSN on October 14, 2021, after spending over 30 years with the CTV / Bell Media family of networks.

On March 24, 2022, it was announced that Black would join NorthStar Gaming as a host and brand ambassador for NorthStar Bets, providing hosting commentary for the company's social media and in-app content.

=== Toronto Blue Jays coverage ===
Black called Toronto Blue Jays games for CTV Sportsnet from 1999 to 2000 alongside Joe Carter and on TSN from 2002 to 2009 with Pat Tabler.

Black also co-hosted CTV's pregame coverage of the 1992 and 1993 World Series with Rob Faulds.

== Awards ==
In 2005, Black won the Sports Media Canada Award as Outstanding Sports Broadcaster and has earned five Gemini Award nominations for Best Sports Broadcaster. In 2008, he was named to the roll of honour of the Manitoba Sportswriters and Sportscasters Association. In 2013, he received the Queen Elizabeth II Diamond Jubilee Medal for his volunteer work with Plan Canada.

== Personal life ==
Black's son Tyler was drafted in the first round of the 2021 Major League Baseball draft by the Milwaukee Brewers. Black was in attendance for Tyler's MLB debut on April 30, 2024, in Milwaukee. He was interviewed by the Bally Sports Wisconsin sideline reporter during Tyler's second at-bat and proceeded to do the play-by-play when Tyler recorded his second hit.

Black is a spokesperson for Plan Canada (formerly Foster Parents Plan).
