= Tyler Black (baseball) =

Canadian baseball player (born 2000)

Milwaukee Brewers – No. 7
- Infielder
- Born: July 26, 2000 (age 26); Toronto, Ontario, Canada
- Bats: Left Throws: Right

MLB debut
- April 30, 2024, for the Milwaukee Brewers

MLB statistics (through 2026 season)
- Batting average: .250
- Home runs: 0
- Runs batted in: 10
- Stats at Baseball Reference

Teams
- Milwaukee Brewers (2024–present)

Tyler Alexander Black (born July 26, 2000) is a Canadian professional baseball infielder for the Milwaukee Brewers of Major League Baseball (MLB). He played college baseball for the Wright State Raiders and made his MLB debut in 2024.

== Amateur career ==
Black grew up in Toronto and attended St. Andrew's College in Aurora, Ontario. He went undrafted out of high school and enrolled at Wright State University to play college baseball.

As a freshman at Wright State in 2019, Black was named the Horizon League Freshman of the Year and first team All-Conference after batting .353 with seven home runs, 41 RBIs, and 23 total extra base hits. He batted .239 in 13 games during his sophomore season in 2020 before it was cut short due to the coronavirus pandemic. As a redshirt sophomore in 2021, Black hit .383 with 13 home runs, 59 RBIs, and a .495 on-base percentage. Black was also named first team All-Horizon League.

== Professional career ==
The Milwaukee Brewers chose Black with the 33rd overall selection of the 2021 Major League Baseball draft. He signed with the Brewers for a $2.2 million signing bonus. Black made his professional debut with Rookie-level Arizona Complex League Brewers and was promoted to the Carolina Mudcats of the Low-A East during the season. Over 26 games between the two teams, he slashed .241/.426/.322 with one home run, eight RBIs, 31 strikeouts and 26 walks over 87 at bats.

He opened the 2022 season with the Wisconsin Timber Rattlers of the High-A Midwest League. In 64 games for the team, Black batted .281/.406/.424 with four home runs, 35 RBI, and 13 stolen bases. He split the 2023 campaign between the Double–A Biloxi Shuckers and Triple–A Nashville Sounds, accumulating a .284/.417/.513 batting line with career–highs in home runs (18), RBI (73), and stolen bases (55) across 123 games.

Black began the 2024 season with the Triple–A Nashville Sounds, hitting .303/.393/.525 with five home runs and 18 RBI across 25 games. On April 30, 2024, Black was selected to the 40-man roster and promoted to the major leagues for the first time. In 18 appearances for the Brewers during his rookie campaign, he batted .204/.316/.245 with two RBI and three stolen bases.

Black was optioned to Triple-A Nashville to begin the 2025 season. On March 28, 2025, it was announced that Black would miss six-to-eight weeks after suffering a fractured right hamate bone. He made five appearances for Milwaukee during the regular season, going 2-for-8 (.250) with one RBI and five walks.

Black was again optioned to Triple-A Nashville to begin the 2026 season. Black played nine games with the Brewers with a .333 batting average and 7 RBI. The Brewers later went on to win the 2026 World Series, their first championship in franchise history.

== Personal life ==
Black is the son of sports announcer Rod Black.
