= Jamie Campbell (sportscaster) =

Canadian sportscaster with Sportsnet (born 1967)

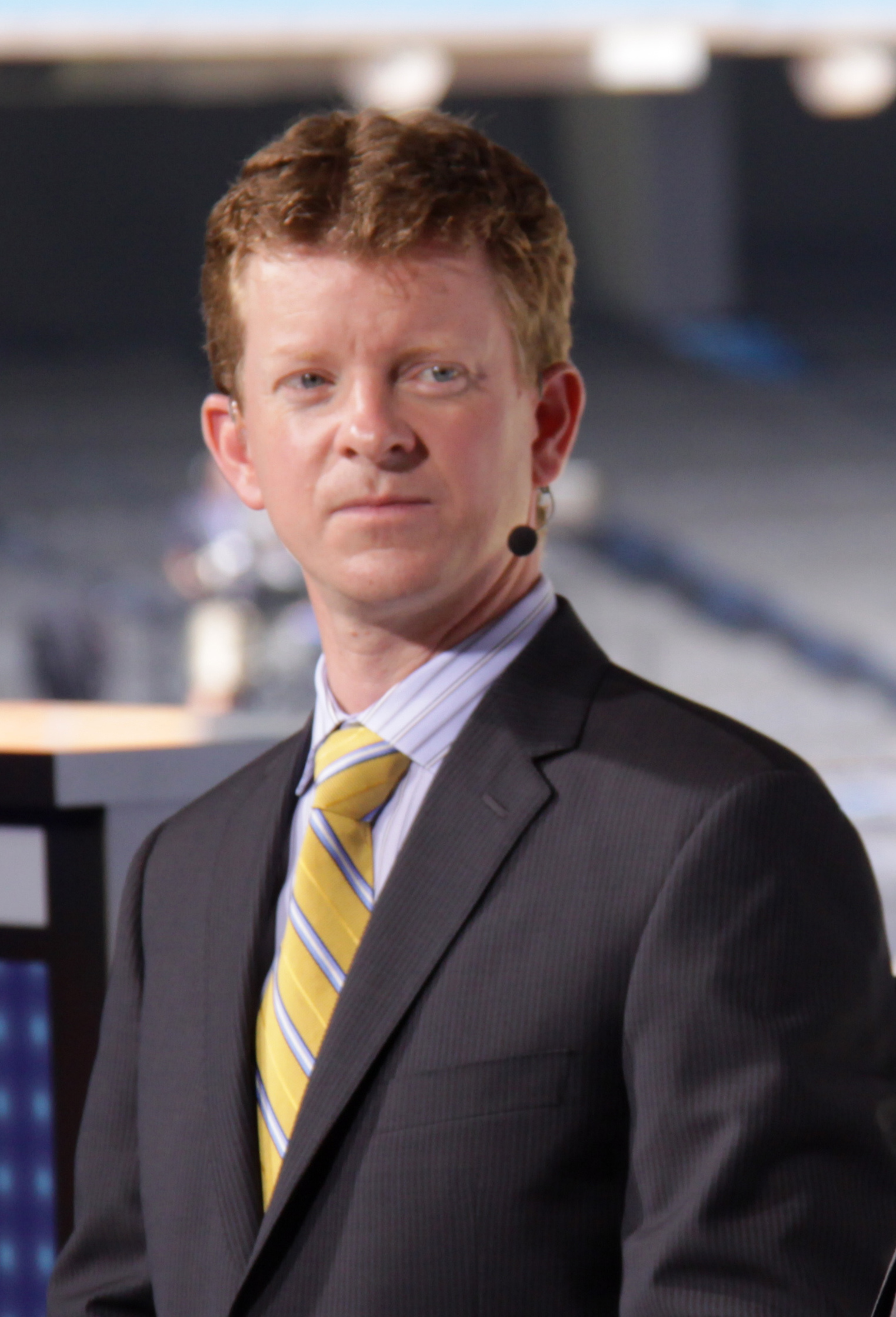
- Jamie Campbell
- Born: May 20, 1967 (age 59)
- Occupation: Broadcaster
- Years active: 1998–present

Jamie Campbell (born May 20, 1967) is a Canadian sportscaster with Sportsnet. He is currently the host of Toronto Blue Jays telecasts and previously provided the play-by-play from 2005 to 2009.

== Youth and education ==
Born and raised in Oakville, Ontario, Campbell attended many Oakville Blades hockey games where his father was the public address announcer.

His love of baseball began in 1977 when his father took him to a game, sparked by a conversation with Lyman Bostock of the Minnesota Twins. Bostock was murdered a year later in Gary, Indiana. As a youth, Campbell regularly attended Blue Jays games.

Campbell also idolized Canadian Formula One driver Gilles Villeneuve and later named one of his sons after him.

Campbell played Little League baseball at Wallace Park in Oakville. He attended Oakville Trafalgar High School where, as a member of the football team, he was a teammate and friend of future National Football League placekicker Steve Christie. In 1986, he went to Ryerson Polytechnical Institute from which he graduated with a Bachelor's in Applied Arts in Radio and Television in 1989.

Andy Campbell is also Jamie’s brother who worked at CTV Atlantic.

== Early career ==
At age 20, Campbell got a job as a librarian and runner for the Hockey Night in Canada archives, where he worked with Don Cherry and Ron MacLean. In 1993, Campbell worked as a sportscaster for the Canadian Broadcasting Corporation in Edmonton, Alberta. From 1997–1998, he worked with CJOH-TV in Ottawa, Ontario.

In 1998, Campbell was offered a job as an anchor with the new cable network CTV Sportsnet (now Rogers Sportsnet) with whom he has remained ever since. He and Daren Millard hosted the station's first show, Sportscentral (later called Sportsnet Connected, now known as Sportsnet Central). As well as anchoring Sportsnet's news shows, Campbell reported from a variety of events such as the Super Bowl and the Olympics. He gained play-by-play experience covering Canadian Football League and Arena Football League games. He also served as the station's in-studio host for Blue Jays broadcasts and Major League Baseball playoffs.

== Toronto Blue Jays ==
Campbell's first game providing play-by-play coverage for the Blue Jays was on April 8, 2002, covering for Rob Faulds after the death of his father forced him to miss a game. In 2005, he took over as the play-by-play voice of the Blue Jays for Sportsnet, replacing Faulds after the death of colour commentator John Cerutti. In December 2009, Campbell was replaced by former Blue Jays commentator Buck Martinez. In 2010, Campbell became the moderator of the newly created pre-game show Blue Jays Central alongside former Blue Jay catcher Gregg Zaun. He hosted the show with Joe Siddall due to Zaun's termination by Sportsnet in 2017, until Siddall got promoted to replace Buck Martinez as the lead television colour commentator in 2026. Campbell now hosts the show alongside Caleb Joseph.

His signature home run call was "You can kiss that one goodbye!", which was previously used by former broadcaster Fergie Olver while he was calling Blue Jay games during the 1980s.

== Olympics ==
As part of the Canadian Olympic Broadcast Media Consortium, Campbell was selected to be play-by-play announcer for the events held at Cypress Mountain during the 2010 Vancouver Olympics, with Canadian former stars such as snowboarder Tara Teigen and mogulist Veronica Brenner.

Campbell called Canada's first gold medal on home soil which was won by Alexandre Bilodeau in the men's moguls, to which he called "And Alex Bilodeau... has done it! He has done it! He has done it! Gold medal for Alex Bilodeau! Oh relax Canada, you can breathe easy now, this great country finally has Olympic gold right here at home!"

Campbell also worked as the main play-by-play announcer for the cycling events at the 2012 Summer Olympics in London.

== Miscellaneous ==
At the 2004 Major League Baseball All-Star Game, Campbell caught the home run hit by David Ortiz, to whom he returned the ball.

As a supporter of the Toronto Blue Jays, Campbell attended games, including the doubleheader on May 4, 1980, in which Otto Velez hit four home runs, Game 3 of the 1992 World Series featuring Devon White's catch, and the August 4, 1983 game in which a throw by Dave Winfield struck and killed a seagull.

In 2008, Campbell was the emcee for the Canadian Baseball Hall of Fame Induction Ceremony, during which Tony Fernández, Billy Harris, Gladwyn Scott and Peter Widdrington were inducted.

== Personal ==
Campbell currently lives in Toronto with his two sons. In March 2022 he announced on Twitter that he had been diagnosed with chronic lymphocytic leukaemia 14 months earlier, and was receiving treatment.
