= Paul Hollingsworth =

Canadian sports reporter and author

- Born: November 9, 1969 (age 57); Dartmouth, Nova Scotia
- Education: Saint Mary's University
- Occupations: Sports reporter, author
- Known for: SportsCentre, TSN, CTV National News
- Spouse: Tamara

Paul Hollingsworth is a Canadian reporter and author based out of Nova Scotia, currently working as the CTV national reporter in Halifax. He previously reported for TSN's flagship sports news program, SportsCentre. He was also a general assignment reporter and anchor for CTV Atlantic.

== Education ==
Hollingsworth was born in Dartmouth, Nova Scotia. He graduated from Saint Mary's University with a Bachelor of Arts in English, as well as a Bachelor of Journalism from the University of King's College.

== Career ==
Hollingsworth began his broadcasting career with CTV in 1995, where he is now a reporter for CTV National News.

Hollingsworth joined TSN in November 2001. During his time at the network, in addition to his work as SportsCentre's Atlantic correspondent, Hollingsworth has reported from the World Series, World Baseball Classic, Super Bowl, 2006 FIFA World Cup, Stanley Cup Playoffs, Tim Hortons Brier, and IIHF World Junior Championship.

== Publications ==
In 2006, Hollingsworth co-authored the book, All Sorts of Sports Trivia and in October 2007, he released his biography of NHL forward Brad Richards which was a best-seller. In November 2010, his third book, Sidney Crosby, The Story of a Champion, was released. It was a top selling soft cover, non-fiction book in Canada upon its release. In October 2015, his fourth book Nathan MacKinnon, The NHL's Rising Star was released.
