= Joe Siddall =

Canadian baseball player (born 1967)

- Catcher
- Born: October 25, 1967 (age 59); Windsor, Ontario, Canada
- Batted: Left Threw: Right

MLB debut
- July 28, 1993, for the Montreal Expos

Last MLB appearance
- September 26, 1998, for the Detroit Tigers

MLB statistics
- Batting average: .169
- Home runs: 1
- Runs batted in: 11
- Stats at Baseball Reference

Teams
- Montreal Expos (1993, 1995); Florida Marlins (1996); Detroit Tigers (1998)

Joseph Todd Siddall (born October 25, 1967) is a Canadian former professional baseball catcher. He played in Major League Baseball (MLB) for the Montreal Expos, Florida Marlins, and Detroit Tigers.

== Professional career ==
Siddall was signed by the Montreal Expos as an amateur free agent in 1987. He played at various levels of their minor league organization before making his MLB debut in 1993. Siddall also appeared in the majors for the Expos in 1995, and became a free agent in the offseason. He signed with the Florida Marlins on November 30, 1995, and appeared in 16 MLB games during the 1996 season. He returned to the Expos minor league organization in 1997 before signing with the Detroit Tigers on December 2, 1997. He made his final MLB appearances in 1998 for the Tigers. In 1999 Siddall played in the Tigers minor league organization, and played his final season of professional baseball in 2000 with the Boston Red Sox minor league organization.

== Broadcasting career ==
On March 1, 2014, Siddall was hired by the Toronto Blue Jays to work alongside Jerry Howarth during Blue Jays radio broadcasts. On February 28, 2018, it was announced that Siddall would move to Sportsnet's television broadcast, taking over for Gregg Zaun on Blue Jays Central. In the 2023 season, Siddall began serving as a substitute colour commentator. In March 2026, it was reported that he would become the main colour commentator, replacing the retiring Buck Martinez.

He won the Canadian Screen Award for Best Sports Analysis or Commentary at the 10th Canadian Screen Awards in 2022.
