= Buck Martinez =

American baseball player, manager, and broadcaster (born 1948)

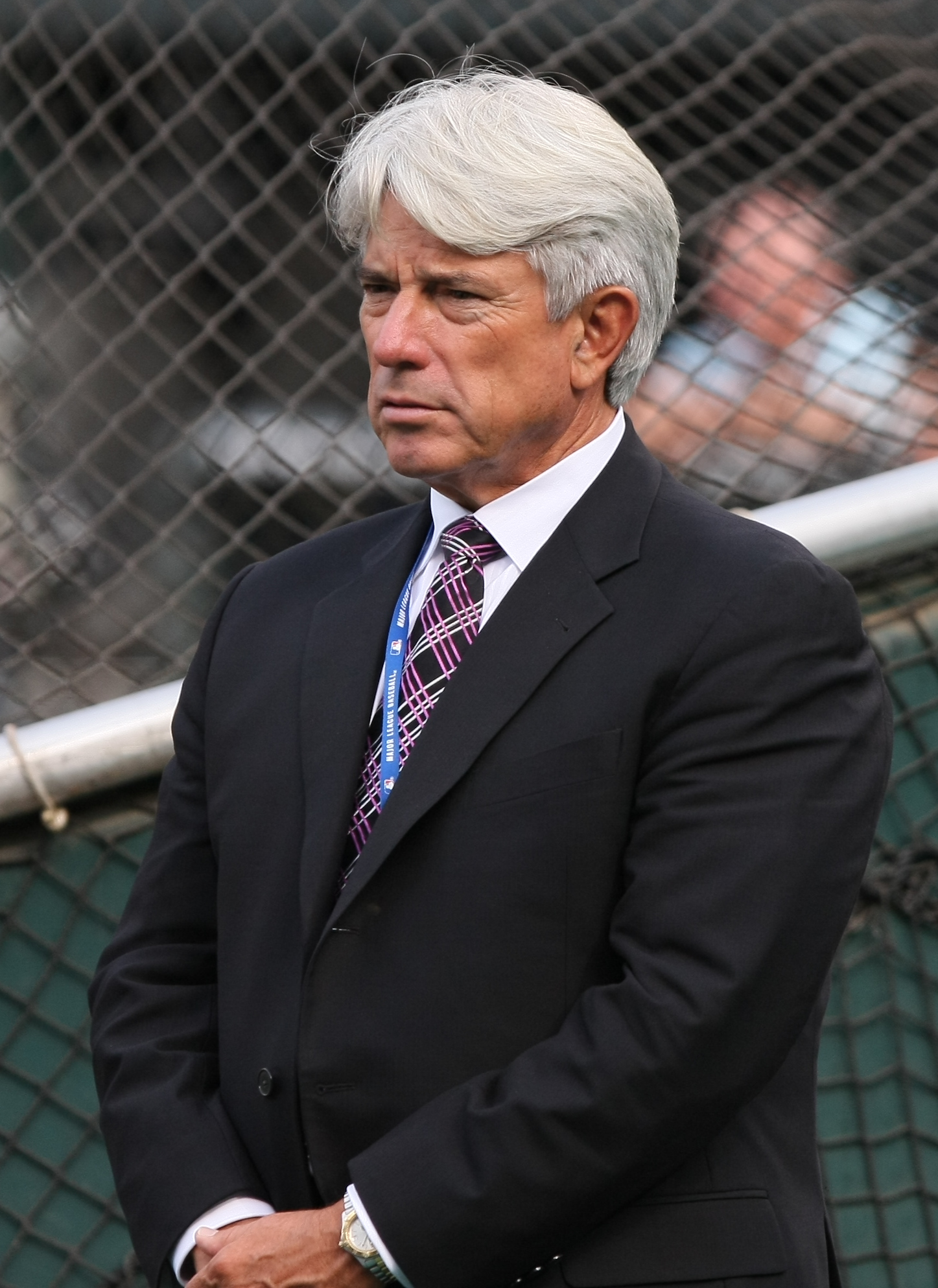
- Martinez in 2009
- Catcher / Manager
- Born: November 7, 1948 (age 78); Redding, California, U.S.
- Batted: Right Threw: Right

MLB debut
- June 18, 1969, for the Kansas City Royals

Last MLB appearance
- October 3, 1986, for the Toronto Blue Jays

MLB statistics
- Batting average: .225
- Home runs: 58
- Runs batted in: 321
- Managerial record: 100–115
- Winning %: .465
- Stats at Baseball Reference
- Managerial record at Baseball Reference

Teams
- As player: Kansas City Royals (1969–1971, 1973–1977); Milwaukee Brewers (1978–1980); Toronto Blue Jays (1981–1986); As manager: Toronto Blue Jays (2001–2002)

Career highlights and awards
- Toronto Blue Jays Hall of Excellence

John Albert "Buck" Martinez (born November 7, 1948) is an American and Karuk former professional baseball catcher and manager, and was the television color commentator for the Toronto Blue Jays until 2025. He played 17 seasons in Major League Baseball (MLB) with the Kansas City Royals, the Milwaukee Brewers, and the Toronto Blue Jays. Since the end of his playing career, he has been a broadcaster, working on the Blue Jays and Baltimore Orioles radio and television broadcasts, and nationally for ESPN, TBS and MLB Network. Martinez managed the Toronto Blue Jays from 2001 to May 2002 and Team USA at the inaugural World Baseball Classic in 2006. He was inducted into the Blue Jays Hall of Excellence on August 29, 2026.

== Playing career ==
Martinez attended Elk Grove High School, Sacramento City College, Sacramento State University, and Southwest Missouri State University. He was originally signed by the Philadelphia Phillies as an amateur free agent before being taken by the Houston Astros in the 1968 Rule 5 draft. On December 16, 1968, the Astros traded Martinez to the Kansas City Royals alongside Mike Sinnerud and Tommy Smith in exchange for Johnny Jones.

Martinez made his major league debut on June 18, 1969, against the Oakland Athletics. He pinch-hit for Ellie Rodríguez in the ninth inning, and hit a flyout for the game's final out. He played in 72 games with the Royals that season, batting .229 with four home runs and 23 RBI. He is mentioned in Jim Bouton's 1970 bestseller Ball Four as John Martinez, a player Bouton and his Seattle teammates know little about. During a meeting, as Bouton's team is devising strategies to effectively pitch to their opponents, manager Joe Schultz lacks any concrete suggestions about the rookie Martinez, and famously advises that they just "zitz" him.

Over the next few years, however, Martinez developed the reputation of being an offensive liability. He never appeared in more than 95 games during his time with Kansas City, through 1977. In the 1976 American League Championship Series, Martinez hit .333 with 4 RBI in five games.

He was traded twice on December 8, 1977, during the Winter Meetings. He was first sent along with Mark Littell to the St. Louis Cardinals for Al Hrabosky, then to the Milwaukee Brewers for George Frazier. In the midst of an 18–8 loss to Kansas City on August 29, 1979, Martinez entered the game as the Brewers' sixth pitcher of the day. As a pitcher, Martinez batted in the ninth inning, stroking an RBI single. For Martinez, who played in over 1,000 career games, this game was his lone appearance in the majors as a pitcher.

Martinez was traded to the Toronto Blue Jays in exchange for Gil Kubski on May 10, 1981. He is most remembered for his time in Toronto, where he twice hit 10 home runs (in 1982 and 1983) and was regarded as a solid defensive catcher. During this time, Martinez formed an effective battery with the Blue Jays' ace pitcher Dave Stieb.

Martinez's career took a bad turn when he broke his leg and severely dislocated his ankle in a home plate collision with the Seattle Mariners' Phil Bradley at the Kingdome on July 9, 1985. After the collision, he still attempted to throw out the advancing runner Gorman Thomas. When the throw went into left field, Thomas tried to come home. However, he was tagged out by a sprawled-out Martinez, who despite having a broken leg had managed to catch the return throw from George Bell on the ground, thus completing a 9–2–7–2 double play.

Martinez was released by the Blue Jays on November 12, 1986, and became a free agent. He was immediately summoned for a meeting with team management, and executive vice president Paul Beeston offered him an opportunity to be a part of the Blue Jays' television broadcast team. Martinez turned down the offer, hoping to instead continue his playing career with another organization. His wife, however, convinced him to call Beeston back and accept the job.

== Broadcasting ==
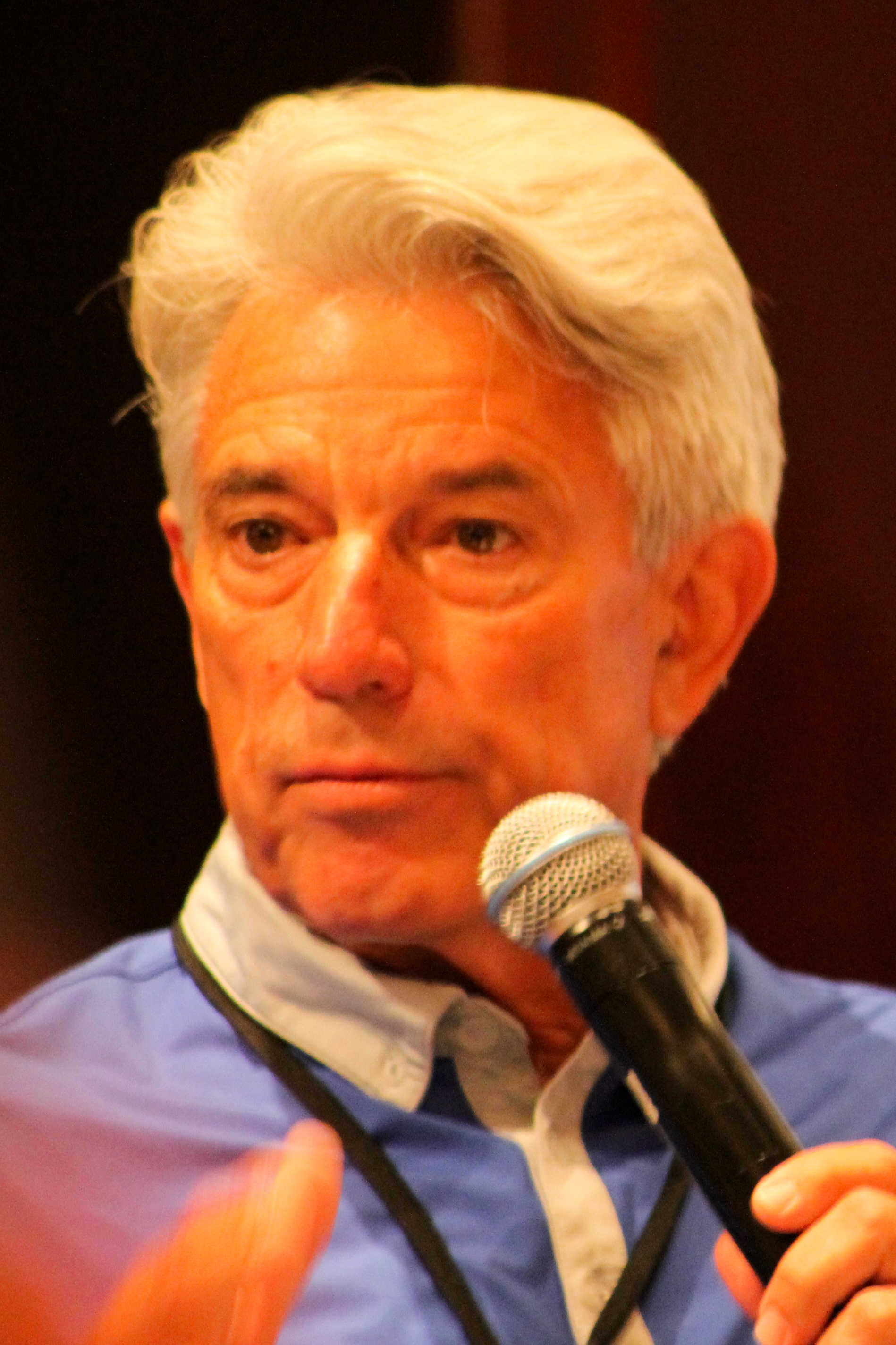
Martinez in 2014

After retiring as an active player following the 1986 season, Martinez began his broadcasting career as a color analyst for Toronto Blue Jays games in 1987. Eventually, this led to a job with TSN in which he was first paired with Fergie Olver. When Olver was replaced by Jim Hughson in 1990, Martinez remained the color analyst. The pair of Hughson and Martinez also worked together on a number of ESPN telecasts, as well as on EA Sports Triple Play Baseball video game series. Hughson left TSN in 1994, and was replaced by Dan Shulman. Like Hughson, Shulman also frequently moonlighted on ESPN and eventually joined ESPN full-time, whereas Martinez became manager of the Blue Jays from 2001 to 2002. During his stint on ESPN, Martinez won a Sports Emmy Award for his work as part of the crew for the broadcast of Cal Ripken's 2,131st consecutive game.

For the 2003 to 2009 seasons, he was the color commentator for Baltimore Orioles television broadcasts, alongside play-by-play announcers Jim Hunter and Gary Thorne on the Mid-Atlantic Sports Network. From 2005 to 2009, Martinez was a co-host of XM Radio's Baseball This Morning show on the MLB Home Plate channel and contributed color commentary for Sunday afternoon games and on TBS, as well as for the network's postseason coverage. In late April 2009, Buck substituted for the ill Jerry Remy as commentator for the three game Red Sox–Rays series for NESN.

Martinez returned to the Blue Jays' broadcast booth in 2010, this time as a play-by-play announcer for their sister company and exclusive broadcaster, Sportsnet, replacing Jamie Campbell, who now hosts the pre-game telecast. His main broadcast partner on Sportsnet was former Blue Jay Pat Tabler. With Shulman's part-time return to the Blue Jays broadcast team in 2016, Martinez now splits duties between play-by-play and color analyst. On September 25, 2014, Rogers announced Martinez had signed a five-year extension to remain the play-by-play announcer for Toronto.

From 2016 to 2020, Martinez participated in the MLB International broadcast of the World Series as the color analyst.

On April 17, 2022, Martinez announced he would take a leave of absence while undergoing treatment for cancer. On July 26, Martinez returned to Sportsnet after the completion of his treatment.

In 2023 Martinez was awarded the Canadian Baseball Hall of Fame's Jack Graney Award as a member of the media who has made significant contributions to baseball in Canada.

In May 2025, Martinez stepped away from the booth again as he underwent treatment for lung cancer. He returned in August.

On February 6, 2026, Martinez announced his retirement from broadcasting.

On August 29, 2026, Martinez was inducted into the Toronto Blue Jays Hall of Excellence.

== Managerial career ==
In 2001, Martinez was hired as Toronto's manager after Jim Fregosi's contract was not renewed. Martinez's energetic attitude was seen as the right fit for the Jays' young roster and through the first two months of the season Toronto outperformed expectations. The success, however, was short-lived as the team struggled through the remainder of the season and finished a mediocre 80–82. He was fired 53 games into the 2002 season after posting a 20–33 record. At the time he was fired, the Blue Jays were on a three-game winning streak, having just swept the Detroit Tigers. He was replaced as manager by Carlos Tosca.

Martinez was selected as the field manager for Team USA in the 2006 inaugural World Baseball Classic. He led the superstar-laden American squad to the second round. While Martinez wore number 13 as both a player and a manager in the Major Leagues, he wore number 31 while managing in the WBC because Alex Rodriguez had already been assigned number 13.

=== Record ===
Team	Year	Regular Season					Postseason			
Team	Year	Games	Won	Lost	Win %	Finish	Won	Lost	Win %	Result
TOR	2001	162	80	82	.494	3rd in AL East	–	–	–	–
TOR	2002	53	20	33	.377	fired	–	–	–	–
Total		215	100	115	.465	–	0	0	–	

== Personal life ==
Martinez and his wife Arlene have one son Casey, a 47th round pick (1,384th overall) by Toronto in the 2000 Major League Baseball draft. They reside in New Port Richey, Florida.

Martinez has authored three books. From Worst To First: The Toronto Blue Jays in 1985 was published in 1985, The Last Out: The Toronto Blue Jays In 1986 in 1986 and Change Up: How to Make the Great Game of Baseball Even Better in 2016.

Buck Martinez served as president of the Baseball Assistance Team from 2020 to 2026 when he was succeeded by Eduardo Perez.

Martinez's paternal grandparents emigrated to the United States from Spain. He is a member of the Karuk Tribe of northern California. His mother, Shirley, was born and raised in Happy Camp, where the Karuk Tribe is centered. He was inducted to the Hispanic Heritage Baseball Museum Hall of Fame in 2012.

In April 2022, Martinez was diagnosed with head and neck cancer. He completed his cancer treatment in June 2022. In May 2025, Martinez underwent treatment for lung cancer.
