= Brad Fay =

Canadian sportscaster

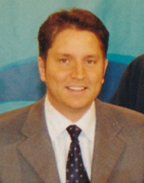
- Fay in 2004
- Born: June 16, 1964 (age 62); Vancouver, British Columbia, Canada
- Occupation: Sportscaster
- Children: Jacob Fay , Robert (Bobby) Fay

Brad Fay (born June 16, 1964) is a Canadian sportscaster for Rogers Sportsnet. Fay began his sportscasting career in 1997 as a weekend sports anchor for BCTV and has also worked in the radio industry calling junior hockey games. He co-hosted the 2010 Vancouver Olympics coverage for Sportsnet. Fay also worked in the newspaper industry.

He has a sister named Erin Farncomb (Fay) and brother a named Greg Fay
