= Rob Faulds =

Canadian sportscaster on Sportsnet

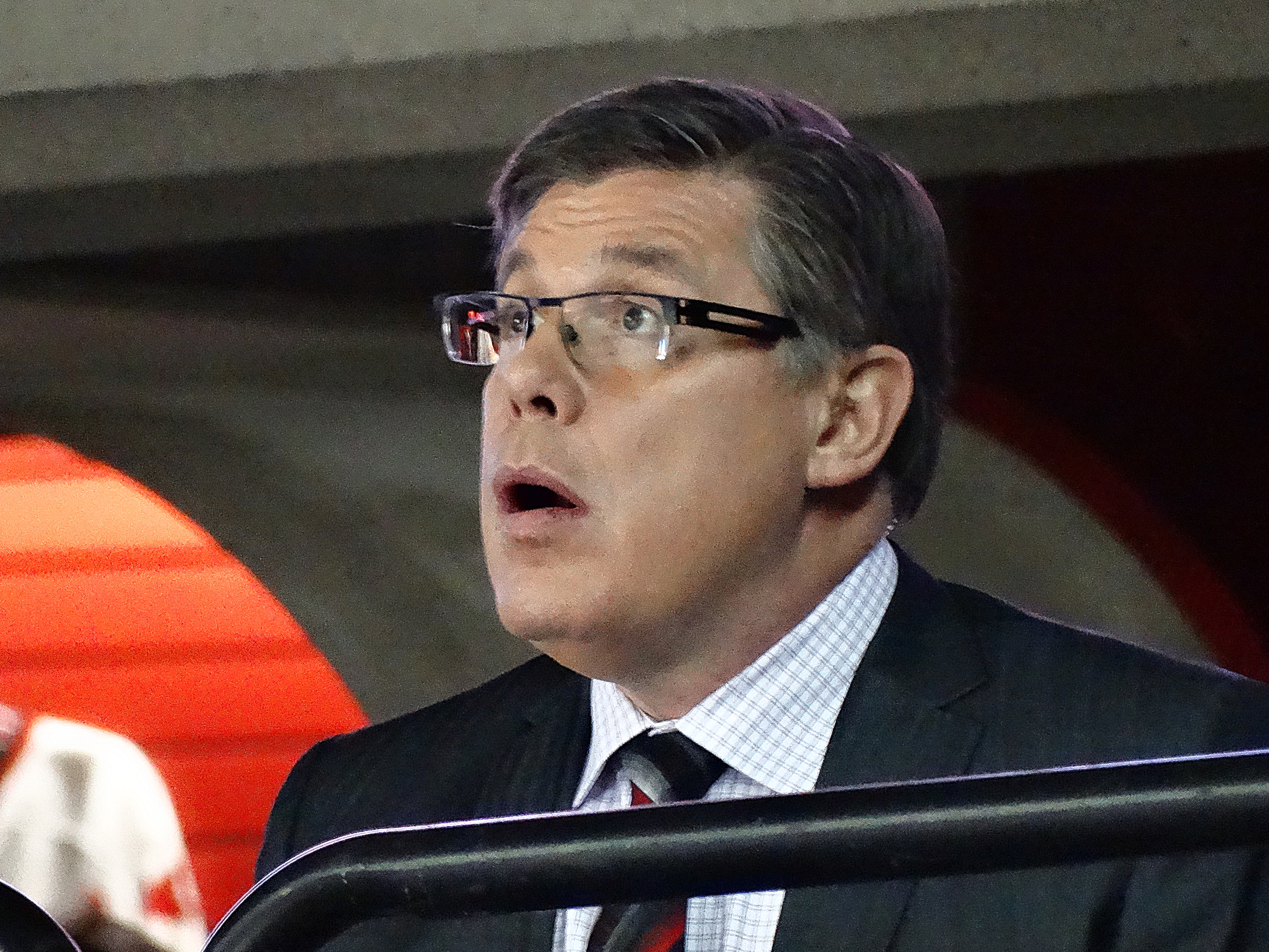
- Rob Faulds in 2014
- Born: September 29, 1955 (age 70); Hamilton, Ontario
- Occupations: sportscaster, sports announcer
- Employer: Sportsnet

Rob Faulds (born September 29, 1955) is a retired Canadian sportscaster on Sportsnet.

Faulds graduated from Western University and started his broadcasting career at CFPL (AM) in London, Ontario. He then worked for CKSO radio and covered the 1992 Summer Olympics and the 1994 Winter Olympics on location for CTV before joining CTV Sports full-time in 1995.

In 1998, Faulds was part of the original Sportsnet team and would go on to host the network's flagship sports news program Sportsnetnews (later re-branded as Sportsnet Central). From 2001 to 2004, he did play-by-play for Toronto Blue Jays telecasts on Sportsnet and has called regional National Hockey League telecasts for the Ottawa Senators and Montreal Canadiens. His home run call for the Blue Jays was "Whattaya think about that?". In the past, he has also called National Lacrosse League games for the network. Faulds most recently called curling and tennis, including the Davis Cup and Canadian Open for Sportsnet, until Faulds announced his retirement from the network.

In 2001, Rob Faulds left CTV in order to stay with Sportsnet.

On the CTV series Power Play, Faulds was the play-by-play voice of the fictitious Hamilton Steelheads. Faulds served as a fill-in host for the radio talk-show Prime Time Sports when regular host Bob McCown was unable to appear.
