= List of Hockey Night in Canada commentators =

The following is the list of commentators who worked on Hockey Night in Canada over the years.

== Current ==
=== Studio host ===
- Andi Petrillo (2026-Present)

== Former ==
=== Play-by-play ===
- Jon Abbott: 2024–2026 (Flames games)
- Rick Ball: 2011–2024
- John Bartlett: 2018–2026 (secondary)
- Dean Brown: 1998–2014
- Bruce Buchanan: 1987–1989
- Bob Cole: 1973–2019
- Chris Cuthbert: 1984–2004, 2020–2026 (primary)
- Ken Daniels: 1992–1997
- Danny Gallivan: 1952–1984
- Bill Hewitt: 1958–1981
- Foster Hewitt: 1952–1958
- Jim Hughson: 1985–1986, 2005–2021
- Dick Irvin Jr.: 1984–1999
- Dan Kelly: 1977–1980
- Mark Lee: 1997–2014
- Mike Luck: 2021–2026 (Senators Games)
- Jack Michaels: 2021–2026 (Oilers games)
- Jiggs McDonald: 1995–1998
- Kevin Quinn: 2014–2020
- Dave Randorf: 2014–2020
- Jim Robson: 1970–1985
- Paul Romanuk: 2014–2018
- Harnarayan Singh: 2021–2026 (number 3)
- John Shorthouse: 2014–2026 (Canucks games)
- Don Wittman: 1979–2007

==== Punjabi ====
- Parminder Singh: 2008–2010
- Bhupinder Hundal: 2014–2018
- Harnarayan Singh: 2008–2021
- Amarinder Singh: 2010–2011
- Inderpreet Cumo: 2011–2014
- Bhola Chauhan: 2011–2014
- Surinder Chahal: 2014–2015
- Harpreet Pandher: 2014–2026
- Randip Janda: 2014–2026
- Gurpreet Sian 2015–2026
- Taqdeer Thindal 2015–2026
- Mantar Bhandal 2017–2026
- Raja Shergill 2019-2026

=== Colour commentators ===
- Scotty Bowman: 1987–1990
- Cassie Campbell-Pascall: 2006–2023
- Guy Carbonneau: 2009–2010
- Don Cherry: 1980–1984
- Sam Cosentino: 2021–2026
- Marc Crawford: 1998–1999, 2008–2009
- Keith Dancy: 1952–1966
- John Davidson: 1983–1986, 1995–2004
- Louie DeBrusk: 2016–2026
- Jack Dennett: 1970–1971 (Vancouver home games)
- Gary Dornhoefer: 1978–1987
- Elmer Ferguson
- John Ferguson Sr.: 1973–1975
- Ray Ferraro: 2024–2026
- Patrick Flatley: 1998–2000
- Garry Galley: 2007–2026
- John Garrett: 1986–1998, 2006–2008, 2014–2026
- Bob Goldham: 1960–1979
- Bill Good: 1971–1978
- Brian Hayward: 1995–2004
- Glenn Healy: 2001–2004, 2009–2016
- Foster Hewitt: 1958–1961
- Kelly Hrudey: 1998–2014
- Bobby Hull: 1980–1983
- Dick Irvin Jr.: 1966–1999
- Mike Johnson: 2014–2016
- Dan Kelly: 1966–1967
- Don Marshall: 1977–1980
- Red Storey: 1976–1979
- Pit Martin: 1979–1980
- Brian McFarlane: 1964–1980
- Howie Meeker: 1969–1987
- Greg Millen: 1995–1998, 1999–2025
- Lou Nanne: 1979
- Harry Neale: 1986–2008
- Bobby Orr: 1977–1980
- Jim Peplinski: 1990–1997
- Gerry Pinder: 1978–1981
- Daryl Reaugh: 2011–2013
- Mickey Redmond: 1980–1986
- Drew Remenda: 2006–2007
- Chico Resch: 1978, 1981, 1984, and 1988 playoffs
- Ted Reynolds: 1978–1979
- Frank Selke Jr.: 1958–1960
- Steve Shutt: 1990–1994
- Craig Simpson: 2007–2026
- Dave Tomlinson: 2023–2026
- Ron Tugnutt: 2005–2007
- Kevin Weekes: 2009–2013

=== Rinkside reporters ===
- David Amber: 2011–2016
- Steve Armitage: 1978–2008
- Kyle Bukauskas: 2016–2026
- Caroline Cameron: 2018–2024, 2025–2026
- Cassie Campbell-Pascall: 2006–2023
- Chris Cuthbert: 1984–1993
- Ken Daniels: 1989–1997
- Elliotte Friedman: 2003–2012
- Martine Gaillard: 1998–2004
- Brenda Irving: 2001–2006
- Faizel Khamisa 2024-2026
- Jeff Marek: 2009–2011
- Shawn Mackenzie: 2019–2026
- Dan Murphy: 2016–2026
- Scott Oake: 1988–2026
- Andi Petrillo: 2011–2014
- Mitch Peacock: 2010–2014
- Bruce Rainnie: 2003–2014
- Ken Reid: 2021–2026
- Sean Reynolds: 2017–2026
- Scott Russell: 1989–2003, 2005–2006
- John Wells: 1979–1984

=== Studio hosts ===
- David Amber: 2016–2026
- Mike Anscombe: 1973–1976
- Steve Armitage: 1978–2008
- Ward Cornell: 1958–1971
- Ted Darling: 1968–1970
- Jack Dennett: 1959–1975
- Johnny Esaw: 1959–1960
- Tom Foley: 1957–1960
- Bill Good Jr.: 1970–1978
- Dave Hodge: 1971–1987
- Dick Irvin Jr.: 1976–1999
- Dan Kelly: 1967–1968, 1978–1980
- Terry Kielty: 1959–1960
- Ron MacLean: 1986–2014, 2016–2026
- Brian McFarlane: 1970–1991
- Wes McKnight: 1952–1958
- Dave Reynolds: 1971–1978
- Ted Reynolds: 1970–1980
- Scott Russell: 1989–2003, 2005–2006
- Lloyd Saunders: 1959–1960
- Frank Selke Jr.: 1960–1967
- George Stroumboulopoulos: 2014–2016
- Jack Wells: 1959–1960
- John Wells: 1979–1984
- Scott Young: 1957–1960

=== Studio analysts ===
- Kevin Bieksa: 2019–2026
- Jennifer Botterill: 2020–2026
- Brian Burke: 2019–2021
- Rick Bowness: 1993–1996 playoffs
- Don Cherry: 1981–2019
- Damien Cox: 2014–2016
- Elliotte Friedman: 2012–2026
- Glenn Healy: 2001–2004, 2009–2016
- Kelly Hrudey: 1998–2026
- Nick Kypreos: 2014–2019
- Howie Meeker: 1969–1987
- Mike Milbury: 2008–2012
- Scott Morrison: 2009–2011
- Babe Pratt: 1970–1980
- P. J. Stock: 2007–2016
- Red Storey: 1970–1977
- Kevin Weekes: 2013–2014
- Cassie Campbell-Pascall: 2019–2023

=== Insiders ===
- Elliotte Friedman: 2012–2026

== See also ==
- NHL on Sportsnet
- List of Canadian Broadcasting Corporation personalities
- List of NHL on Sportsnet commentators
