= List of NHL on Sportsnet commentators =

The following is a list of personalities who have broadcast National Hockey League games on Rogers Sportsnet and its affiliated television properties since its inception as CTV Sportsnet in 1998. This includes telecasts that are part of the current national television contract in Canada under the titles Monday Night Hockey and Rogers Saturday Night Hockey. It also includes games under the national cable contract of 1998 to 2002, as well as regional telecasts of Canadian-based clubs that have appeared on regional Sportsnet channels.

== Current ==
=== National ===
- John Bartlett (Montréal or Ottawa, secondary): 2014–2017, 2018–present
- Chris Cuthbert (Toronto, primary): 2020–present
- Harnarayan Singh (Winnipeg): 2021–present; (formerly Calgary, Edmonton, and Vancouver: 2021-2026; Ottawa: 2021-2022)
- Mike Luck (Ottawa, third): 2022–present

=== Regional ===
- Jon Abbott (Calgary): 2024–present
- Chris Cuthbert (Toronto): 2021–present
- Jack Michaels (Edmonton): 2021–present
- John Shorthouse (Vancouver): 1998–99, 2008–present

=== Colour Commentators ===
==== National ====
- Craig Simpson (Toronto, primary): 1998–2002, 2014–present
- Garry Galley (Montréal or Ottawa, secondary): 2014–present
- Sam Cosentino (Winnipeg): 2021–present; (formerly Ottawa: 2021–2026)
- Jason York (Ottawa, third): 2010–2014, 2026–present; (formerly Calgary: 2025–2026, Montréal: 2014–2017)

==== Regional ====
- Louie DeBrusk (Edmonton): 2008–2014, 2018–present
- Craig Simpson (Toronto): 2021–present; (formerly Edmonton 1998–2003)
- Ray Ferraro (Vancouver): 2023–present; (formerly Edmonton 2003–2008)
- Dave Tomlinson (Vancouver): 2023–present
- Kevin Sawyer (Calgary): 2026–present

=== Studio hosts ===
- Ron MacLean: 2014–present
- David Amber: 2014–present
- Caroline Cameron: 2018–2024, 2025–2026, 2027-present

=== Studio analysts ===
- Elliotte Friedman: 2014–present (Saturday)
- Colby Armstrong: 2016–present (Saturday)
- Kevin Bieksa: 2020–present (Saturday)
- Luke Gazdic: 2021–present (Monday)
- Jamal Mayers: 2021–present
- Justin Williams: 2023–present (Monday)

=== Insiders ===
- Elliotte Friedman: 2014–present

=== Rinkside reporters ===
- Gene Principe (Edmonton): 1998–present
- Dan Murphy (Vancouver): 2001–present
- Shawn McKenzie (Toronto, regional; Montréal or Ottawa, secondary): 2015–present
- Kyle Bukauskas (Toronto, primary): 2016–present
- Caroline Cameron (Montréal or Ottawa, third): 2018–2024, 2025–2026, 2027–present
- Sean Reynolds (Winnipeg): 2021–present
- Brendan Parker (Calgary): 2025–present
- Ailish Forfar (Ottawa, third): 2026–present

== Past ==
=== Play-by-Play ===
==== National ====
- R.J. Broadhead: 2014–2021
- Bob Cole: 2014–2019 (Hockey Night in Canada)
- Jim Hughson: 1998–2002; 2014–2021 (Lead)
- Dave Randorf: 2014–2020 (Second or third)
- Paul Romanuk: 2014–2018 (Secondary, Toronto)

==== Regional ====
- Rick Ball (Calgary): 2014-2024
- John Bartlett (Montréal): 2014–2017, (Toronto): 2018–2020
- Joe Bowen (Toronto): 2001–2014
- Dean Brown (Ottawa): 1999–2014
- Bruce Buchanan (Edmonton): 1998–2001, (Calgary): 2001–2002
- Rob Faulds: (Ottawa): 1998–99, (Montréal): 2002–2004
- Jim Hughson (Vancouver) 1999–2008
- Rob Kerr (Calgary): 2011–2014
- Ryan Leslie (Calgary): 2018–2025
- Peter Loubardias (Calgary): 2008–2011
- Roger Millions (Calgary): 2002–2008
- Mike Toth (Calgary) 1998–1999
- Kevin Quinn (Calgary): 1999–2001, (Edmonton): 2001–2020
- Ed Whalen (Calgary): 1998–1999

=== Colour Commentators ===
==== National ====
- Louie DeBrusk: 2016–2026
- Glenn Healy: 2014–2016
- Mike Johnson: 2014–2016
- Greg Millen: 1998–1999, 2014–2025
- John Garrett: 1998–2002, 2014–2026

==== Regional ====
- Cassie Campbell-Pascall (Calgary): 2014–2023
- Garry Galley (Toronto): 2017–2020, (Ottawa): 2003–2010
- John Garrett (Vancouver): 2002–2023; (formerly Calgary 1998–2008)
- Kelly Hrudey (Calgary): 2014–2026
- Mike Johnson (Toronto): 2014–2016
- Greg Millen (Calgary): 2021–2025; (formerly Ottawa 1998–2003 and Toronto 2006–2020)
- Harry Neale (Toronto): 2001–2007
- Denis Potvin (Ottawa): 2010–2014
- Ryan Walter (Vancouver): 1998–2002, (Calgary): 2002–2008, (Montréal) 2002–2004
- Drew Remenda: (Edmonton): 2014–2020
- Charlie Simmer (Calgary): 2008–2014

=== Studio hosts ===
- Darren Dreger: 1998–2001
- Leah Hextall: 2014–2016
- Jeff Marek: 2014–2021
- Daren Millard: 2001–2018
- George Stroumboulopoulos: 2014–2016 (Hockey Night in Canada)

=== Studio analysts ===
- Brian Burke: 2018–2021
- Jennifer Botterill: 2021–2026
- Damien Cox: 2011–2016
- Don Cherry: 2014–2019
- Glenn Healy: 2014–2016
- Corey Hirsch: 2014–2022
- Kelly Hrudey: 2014–2026
- Billy Jaffe: 2014–2016
- Mike Johnson: 2014–2016
- Chris Johnston: 2014–2021
- Nick Kypreos: 1998–2019
- Greg Millen: 1998–1999
- Doug MacLean: 2009–2019
- Scott Morrison: 2014–2019
- John Shannon: 2005–2019
- Anthony Stewart: 2019–2024
- P. J. Stock: 2014–2016

=== Insiders ===
- Chris Johnston: 2014–2021
- John Shannon: 2005–2019
- Nick Kypreos: 1998–2014

=== Rinkside reporters ===
- David Amber: 2014–2016
- Cassie Campbell-Pascall: 2014–2023
- Chantal Desjardins: 2014–2016
- Faizal Khamisa (Ottawa, third): 2024–2025, 2026; (formerly late-night games 2025–2026)
- Roger Millions: 2008–2018
- Ryan Leslie: 2018-2025
- Scott Oake: 2014–2026 (late-night games & After Hours)
- Christine Simpson 1998-2024
- Perry Solkowski: 1998–2001
- Mike Toth: 1998–2008
