= Wednesday Night Hockey (Sportsnet) =

Canadian television series

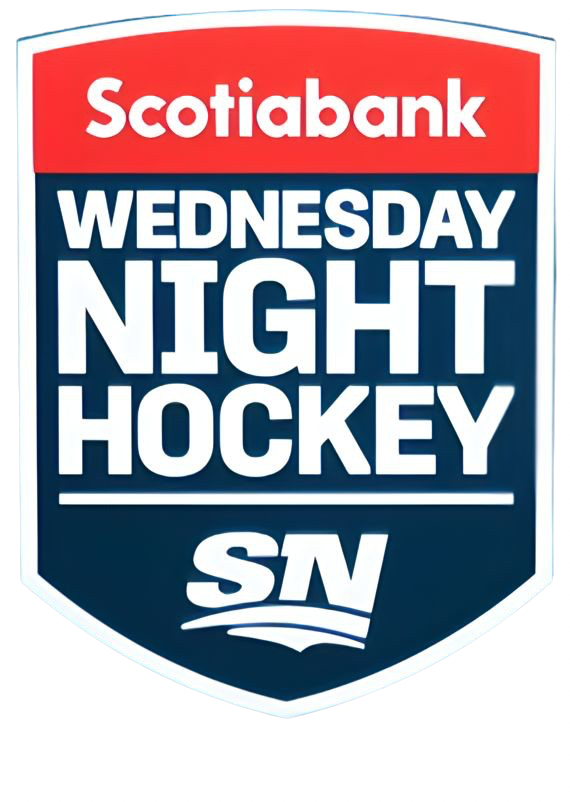
- Logo used from 2021-2026
- Also known as: Scotiabank Wednesday Night Hockey (2014–2026)
- Genre: NHL hockey telecasts
- Created by: Rogers Media; Sportsnet
- Presented by: Daren Millard (2014-2018); Jeff Marek (2018-2021); Caroline Cameron (2021-2024); David Amber (2024-2026)
- Theme music composer: Stephan Moccio (2014–2021); Ubiquitous Synergy Seeker (2021–2026)
- Opening theme: "Sportsnet Refreshed Hockey Theme" (2014–2021) "Never Stop" (2021–2026)
- Country of origin: Canada

Production
- Production locations: Canadian Broadcasting Centre, Toronto (2014–2021); Rogers Building, Toronto (2021-2026)
- Camera setup: Multi-camera
- Running time: 180 minutes or until the end of the game

Original release
- Network: Sportsnet (2014-2026)
- Release: October 8, 2014 – April 15, 2026

Related
- NHL on Sportsnet; NHL on Prime Video; NHL on ESPN; NHL on TNT

Wednesday Night Hockey was the branding used by Sportsnet for Canadian broadcasts of National Hockey League (NHL) games on Wednesday nights. The broadcasts were aired between the 2014–15 and 2025–26 NHL seasons.

Scotiabank Wednesday Night Hockey debuted on October 8, 2014, with a doubleheader of the Montreal Canadiens at the Toronto Maple Leafs, then followed by the Calgary Flames and the Vancouver Canucks.

== History ==
=== Background ===
On November 26, 2013, Rogers Communications publicly announced its 12-year deal to become the exclusive national rightsholder for the National Hockey League beginning in the 2014–15 season.

In the lead-up to the 2014–15 season, Rogers began to promote its networks as the new home of the NHL through a multi-platform advertising campaign; the campaign featured advertising and cross-promotions across Rogers' properties, such as The Shopping Channel, which began to feature presentations of NHL merchandise, and its parenting magazine Today's Parent, which began to feature hockey-themed stories in its issues. On May 28, 2014, Rogers announced a six-year sponsorship deal with Scotiabank, which saw the bank become the title sponsor for Wednesday Night Hockey which had previously aired on TSN from 2002 to 2014.

=== 2014-2021 ===
Sportsnet's coverage premiered on October 8, 2014, with an opening night doubleheader which featured the Montreal Canadiens vs the Toronto Maple Leafs, followed with the Calgary Flames against the Vancouver Canucks. The inaugural game was the most-watched program of the night in Canada, and the most-watched telecast in Sportsnet's history, with 2.01 million viewers (beating the previous record of 1.44 million set by the Toronto Blue Jays' home opener in 2013, but since surpassed by multiple games of the 2015 American League Division Series involving the Blue Jays, which topped out at 4.38 million viewers for game 4). However, viewership was down from 2013's opening night game, which was televised by CBC.

Sportsnet's NHL broadcasts, along with its studio show Hockey Central, originated from the Canadian Broadcasting Centre, the headquarters of former rightsholder CBC. Rogers rented Studio 41 of the facility, which is adjacent to Studio 42, the previous home of Hockey Night in Canada, to build an 11,000 square-foot studio for its NHL programming. The $4.5 million set, designed by Jack Morton/PDG, features fourteen cameras, a 38 feet (12 m) wide, 11 feet (3.4 m) high arc-shaped video wall nicknamed the "Goliath", and 9 distinct set areas that serve various functions. The set areas include a central, rotating desk, three separate set areas for regional games and other segments, a "demo wall" (a video wall with a screen under the floor directly in front of it; virtual ice markings can be projected on the floor for play analysis), an interactive "puck wall" that can display stats for specific teams by placing their corresponding puck prop into a reader. During his tenure as host, the set featured an informal interview area intended for Stroumboulopoulos, which featured red armchairs as an homage to his previous talk show. The studio can produce broadcasts for up to three channels at once using its various sets and cameras.

Sportsnet staff emphasized a focus on storytelling throughout its NHL coverage, with a particular focus on the personal lives of the league's top players. Although Sportsnet executive Scott Moore did explain that Sportsnet's overall goal was to "celebrate" hockey and downplay some of the NHL's recent issues, such as labor disputes, he emphasized that the network would not be the NHL's "cheerleaders", and would still be prepared to discuss issues that affect the game. Sportsnet's coverage also places an emphasis on new technology; referees can be equipped with helmet cams for first-person perspectives, and a Skycam was installed at Air Canada Centre for use in aerial shots. Rogers plans to install Skycam units at each Canadian NHL arena for use in its coverage and the GameCentre Live GamePlus features.

Sportsnet's NHL broadcasts, along with its studio show Hockey Central, originated from the Canadian Broadcasting Centre, the headquarters of former rightsholder CBC. Rogers rented Studio 41 of the facility, which is adjacent to Studio 42, the previous home of Hockey Night in Canada, to build an 11,000-square-foot studio for its NHL programming.

=== 2021-2026 ===
In June 2021, Rogers announced that it would move its NHL studio from the Canadian Broadcasting Centre to the Rogers Building for the 2021–22 season. Two new sets were constructed as part of the "Sportsnet Studios" project, with one area incorporating a 50 foot (15 metres) curved video wall, as well as support for a virtual set extension via green screens, and augmented reality graphics. A new on-air graphics package was also adopted, as well as new theme music by the alternative rock duo Ubiquitous Synergy Seeker (USS).

2025–26 NHL season became the last year for Sportsnet's Wednesday Night Hockey, as rights to Wednesday games were sold to Amazon Prime beginning in 2026–27. Prime will be the exclusive broadcaster of Wednesday games until 2037–38.

== Personalities ==
While primarily using existing Sportsnet talent, a number of CBC Sports personalities, including the lead play-by-play crew of Jim Hughson, Craig Simpson and, until 2016, Glenn Healy, veteran play-by-play man Bob Cole, rinkside reporter Scott Oake and studio analyst Elliotte Friedman, joined Rogers to participate in Sportsnet's coverage and Hockey Night. These CBC alumni were joined by two former TSN personalities, Dave Randorf and Paul Romanuk.

Caroline Cameron was the host of Wednesday Night Hockey, while she also hosts Thursday night games along with reporting during Hockey Central Saturday. During the 2024-25 NHL season, David Amber became the host of Wednesday Night Hockey due to Cameron's maternity leave and remained host for 2025-26 NHL Season after Cameron's return due to Monday Night Hockey being sublicenced to Prime Video under a two-year deal.

On June 5, 2020, Sportsnet announced that it had hired TSN commentator and former Hockey Night in Canada broadcaster Chris Cuthbert. Cuthbert replaced both Dave Randorf (no. 2 announcer) and John Bartlett (Maple Leafs regional announcer); Randorf left Sportsnet to join the Tampa Bay Lightning as its television voice, while Bartlett continued to call select national games. Greg Millen, who like Bartlett was also reassigned to national game duty, was replaced by Craig Simpson on the Maple Leafs' regional broadcasts.

During the 2020–21 season, Cuthbert filled-in for Jim Hughson as the lead play-by-play voice of Sportsnet after Hughson opted to call only nationally televised Canucks home games and was promoted full-time the following season after Hughson's retirement. Meanwhile, HNIC Punjabi-language voice Harnarayan Singh was promoted to secondary play-by-play announcer, filling in the role originally given to Cuthbert and fully replaced Cuthbert full-time.

In the summer of 2021, Sportsnet talents Cassie Campbell-Pascall and Leah Hextall joined the NHL on ESPN broadcast team in the U.S. Similar to the situation involving TSN and fellow ESPN analyst Ray Ferraro, Campbell-Pascall and Hextall would continue to work with Sportsnet whilst making occasional appearances south of the border on ESPN.

Unlike its American counterpart on NBC (with Mike Emrick) and later TNT (with Kenny Albert and Brendan Burke), the broadcast team calling Scotiabank Wednesday Night Hockey varies depending on location and the teams involved. Games featuring Canadian teams in the Eastern and Central Time Zones are usually called by Chris Cuthbert (mainly Toronto Maple Leafs games) and John Bartlett (typically Montreal Canadiens, Ottawa Senators or Winnipeg Jets games). As Sportsnet also holds regional network rights to teams west of Manitoba, their team-specific announcers typically call games for the Calgary Flames, Edmonton Oilers and Vancouver Canucks, although on some occasions, Harnarayan Singh would call the games instead.

Preceded by TSN	NHL English network broadcast partner in Canada; 2014 - present	Succeeded by none
