= Hockey Central =

- Also known as: Hockey Central Tonight; Hockey Central Saturday
- Genre: Hockey news
- Presented by: National: David Amber; Faizal Khamisa; Ron MacLean (Saturday); Regional Intermission: Anna Dua (Sunday); Leafs Pre-game: David Amber
- Theme music composer: Shawnee Kish and Jane’s Party (Saturday)
- Opening theme: "Saturday Night" (Saturday)
- Country of origin: Canada

Production
- Production locations: Rogers Building, Toronto
- Running time: 22–26 minutes

Original release
- Network: Sportsnet; Sportsnet+ (Mondays); CBC (Saturdays, 2014-2026); Citytv (Saturdays, 2014-2026)
- Release: October 9, 1998 – present

Related
- NHL on Sportsnet

Hockey Central is the brand used for programs and segments covering hockey (particularly the National Hockey League) on the Canadian sports channel Sportsnet. The Hockey Central name encompasses several programs, including segments aired during Sportsnet Central, pre-game reports for NHL telecasts on Sportsnet, and the Sportsnet 590 radio show Hockey Central at Noon.

== Overview ==
=== Format ===
The typical format of Hockey Central's segments during Sportsnet Central and the Saturday show is a four-person panel of former NHL players, coaches, and GMs alongside hockey reporters and broadcasters. The members of the panel vary from day to day, but are usually from the same small pool of regulars. The show is known for (and often promotes) its sometimes fiery debates between Bill Watters and Nick Kypreos.

In the summer of 2006, host Darren Dreger left Sportsnet to join TSN and in 2018, Daren Millard left the network, and in 2021, Jeff Marek moved to an NHL insider role, until he departed the network in 2024. Caroline Cameron and David Amber are the current hosts of most of the Hockey Central segments appearing on Sportsnet.

As of Rogers' 2014-15 rights deal, Hockey Central Saturday replaced Scotiabank Hockey Tonight as the pre-game show for Hockey Night in Canada, airing in simulcast with Sportsnet and CBC Television.

During the 2013 Stanley Cup Playoffs, The Score (after its purchase by Rogers) aired a nightly Hockey Central Playoff Xtra.

== Radio versions ==
Sportsnet's radio stations also air hockey-oriented programs under the same or similar titles, often with a focus on news and analysis relating to their local teams.

=== Hockey Central on CJCL ===
Rogers' Toronto radio station CJCL broadcasts a radio version of the show, initially known as Hockey Central at Noon, which is simulcast by Sportsnet 360.

The program was originally hosted by Daren Millard. Between August 2010 and March 2011, it was hosted by Greg Brady, who worked the noon to 3pm shift. In March 2011, Brady was reassigned to the morning show and Millard returned as host. Jeff Marek replaced Daren Millard as host in 2018. When Brady was unable to host Hockey Central at Noon, Doug Farraway served as fill-in host. During the summer (from mid-June until September) during Millard's first hosting stint, Farraway took over the hosting duties from him, with Howard Berger serving as fill-in for Farraway.

In October 2019 as part of changes to CJCL's lineup, the program expanded to two hours.

The program has a national focus; CJCL airs a Toronto Maple Leafs-focused program immediately before Hockey Central, the Leafs Hour, with Ben Ennis and JD Bunkis.

=== Hockey Central 960 ===
CFAC in Calgary broadcast Hockey Central 960, which was hosted by Kelly Kirch and Peter Klein. The program primarily focused on coverage of the Calgary Flames until it was shutdown on July 7, 2026.

=== Canucks Central ===
KiSS West Coast in Vancouver broadcasts Canucks Central during intermissions which is hosted by Dominic Šramaty and Arash Memarzadeh, and focuses on the Vancouver Canucks.

== Personalities ==
- David Amber
- Caroline Cameron
- Justin Bourne
- Sam Cosentino
- Elliotte Friedman
- Luke Gazdic
- Justin Williams
- Ron MacLean (Hockey Central Saturday only)
- Kevin Bieksa (Hockey Central Saturday only)
- Colby Armstrong (Hockey Central Saturday only)

== Former personalities ==
- Greg Brady (Hockey Central at Noon only)
- Mike Brophy
- Jennifer Botterill
- Cassie Campbell-Pascall
- Anson Carter
- Chantal Desjardins (Canadiens Central only)
- Glenn Healy
- Leah Hextall (Hockey Central Alberta only)
- Kelly Hrudey
- Nick Kypreos
- Pierre LeBrun
- Doug MacLean
- Jeff Marek
- Daren Millard
- John Shannon
- Christine Simpson
- Anthony Stewart
- P.J. Stock
- George Stroumboulopoulos (Hockey Central Saturday only)
- Keith Yandle

== See also ==
- That's Hockey, a competing program aired by TSN
