= Wednesday Night Hockey =

Wednesday Night Hockey may refer to:

== Canada ==
- Wednesday Night Hockey (2002–2004), on TSN Hockey
- Wednesday Night Hockey (Sportsnet) (2014–2026), on the NHL on Sportsnet
- Wednesday Night Hockey, on NHL on Prime Video (2026–)

== United States ==
- Wednesday Night Hockey (1992–2004), on the NHL on ESPN
- Wednesday Night Hockey (NBCSN) (2013–2021), on the NHL on NBCSN
- Wednesday Night Hockey (2021–present), on the NHL on TNT
