= Gord Stellick =

Canadian sportscaster

Gord Stellick (born May 26, 1957, in Toronto, Ontario) is a Canadian sports broadcaster and former NHL executive. Stellick formerly hosted The Fan 590 Morning Show with Don Landry, and also appears on Hockey Central on Rogers Sportsnet. Stellick served as the host of the pre-game edition of "Blue And White Tonight" between 6PM-7PM on The Fan 590 during the game nights that the Toronto Maple Leafs played, as well as the post-game edition of the show. Stellick is co-host of the "NHL Morning Skate" drive time show with Scott Laughlin on SiriusXM Satellite Radio's NHL Network Radio. Stellick replaced former host Mike Ross, host of "Hockey Today" since 2009

Stellick was the General Manager of the Toronto Maple Leafs from April 1988 until August 1989. At the age of 30, he was the youngest GM in NHL history, and still remains the youngest GM in Maple Leafs history. He resigned on August 11, 1989, citing interference from Maple Leafs' owner Harold Ballard. Stellick was then hired by the New York Rangers as an assistant GM, but was fired in 1991. Stellick was once co-owner of the Toronto Beaches Jr. A lacrosse team. Stellick can be seen on TV as a commentator for hockey games.

Stellick’s record as the youngest GM in NHL history was broken prior to the 2016-17 NHL season when the Arizona Coyotes named John Chayka their general manager, at just 26 years old at the time, on May 5th 2016.

Stellick co-wrote, with Damien Cox, the book '67: The Maple Leafs, Their Sensational Victory and the End of an Empire, (ISBN 0-470-83850-7) about the last season the Toronto Maple Leafs won the Stanley Cup.

Preceded by Gerry McNamara	General manager of the Toronto Maple Leafs; 1988–89	Succeeded by Floyd Smith
