= Sportsnet Magazine =

- Editor in Chief, Publisher: John Intini
- Staff writers: Stephen Brunt Scott Feschuk Ben Nicholson- Smith Arden Zwelling
- Categories: Sports magazine
- Frequency: Biweekly
- First issue: September 29, 2011
- Final issue: December 2016
- Company: Rogers Media
- Country: Canada
- Based in: Toronto, Ontario
- Language: English

Sportsnet Magazine was a Canadian bi-weekly sports magazine published by Rogers Media in conjunction with its sports television channel Sportsnet. In January 2016 the magazine was redesigned as an online-only publication.

== History ==
On June 9, 2011, Rogers executive Ken Whyte announced plans for a new sports magazine as a brand extension of Rogers' Sportsnet television channel, modeled off a similar magazine produced by ESPN. The first issue was released on September 29, 2011, with Sidney Crosby on the cover; the launch of Sportsnet Magazine came alongside a major re-branding of Rogers' sports broadcasting outlets. The first woman to appear on the cover was the late skier Sarah Burke.

The print edition terminated at the end of 2016. Beginning in January 2017, the magazine is to publish online only.
