= NHL on Sportsnet =

Canadian television series

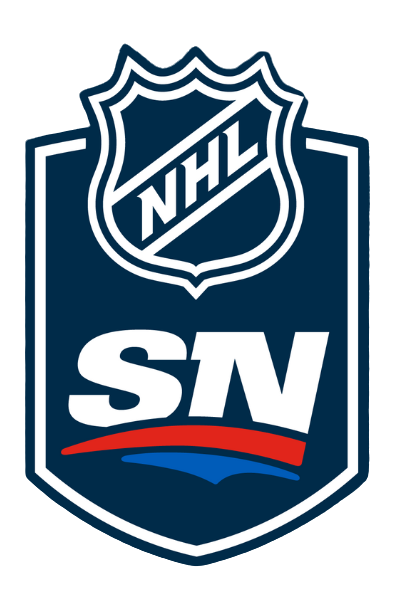
- Also known as: Regional: Rogers Canucks Hockey on Sportsnet Pacific (2026-present); Rogers Oilers Hockey on Sportsnet West (2013-present); Telus Flames Hockey on Sportsnet West (2010-present); Molson Canadian Leafs Hockey on Sportsnet Ontario (1998-present); Canadiens Hockey on Sportsnet East presented by Rogers (2014-2017); Scotiabank Senators Hockey on Sportsnet East (2009-2013); National: Rogers Saturday Night Hockey (2026-present); Sportsnet+ Monday Night Hockey (2026-present); Scotiabank Wednesday Night Hockey (2014-2026); Rogers Monday Night Hockey (2022–2024); Rogers Hometown Hockey (2014–2022); NHL on Rogers; Labatt Blue Tuesday Night Hockey (1998–2001); Labatt Blue NHL Gamenight (2001–2002); NHL Gamenight on Sportsnet; NHL Gamenight Replay
- Genre: Sports
- Created by: Rogers Media; Sportsnet
- Starring: Various
- Theme music composer: Stephan Moccio (2011–2021); Ubiquitous Synergy Seeker (2021–2026)
- Opening theme: "The Hockey Song" (1998–2002) "Sportsnet Hockey Theme" (2011–2014) "Sportsnet Refreshed Hockey Theme" (2014–2021) "Never Stop" (2021–2026)
- Country of origin: Canada
- No. of seasons: 40
- No. of episodes: 554

Production
- Production locations: Rogers Building, Toronto
- Camera setup: Multi-camera
- Running time: 180 minutes or until end of the game

Original release
- Network: Sportsnet
- Release: October 9, 1998 – present

Related
- NHL on Prime Video; NHL on ESPN / NHL on ABC (U.S. rightsholders); NHL on TNT (U.S. rightsholders)

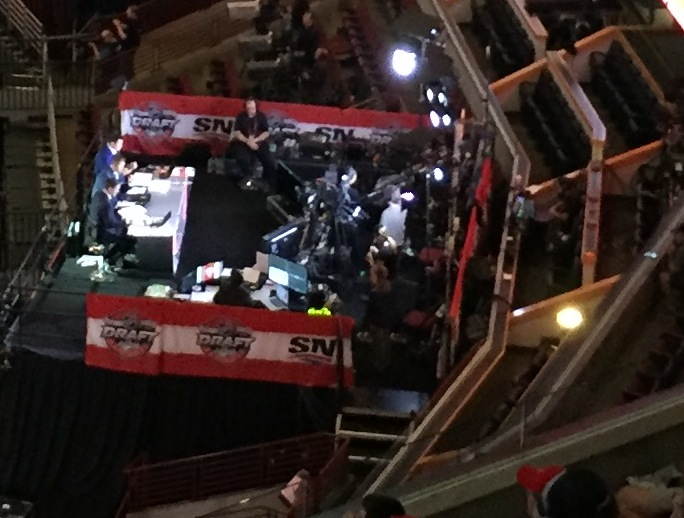
Sportsnet covering the 2017 NHL entry draft

National Hockey League broadcasts are held by Canadian media corporation Rogers Communications, showing on its television channel Sportsnet and other networks owned by or affiliated with its Rogers Sports & Media division, as well as the Sportsnet Radio chain under the NHL on Sportsnet brand which serves as a blanket title. Sportsnet (then known as CTV Sportsnet) previously held the national cable rights for NHL regular season and playoff games from 1998 to 2002.

In November 2013, Rogers reached a 12-year deal to become the exclusive national television and digital rightsholder for the NHL in Canada, beating out both CBC Sports and TSN. The first telecasts under the new contract premiered on October 8, 2014—the first night of the 2014–15 NHL season; the deal primarily emphasizes increased access to NHL content in Canada, with plans to leverage Rogers' various broadcast and cable television outlets, along with CBC Television as part of a time-brokerage agreement, to air a larger number of NHL games nationally than under previous deals with CBC and TSN. Rogers' national contract complements its existing regional coverage of the NHL, holding partial or exclusive regional rights to four of the league's Canadian franchises.

Rogers hired a number of prominent personalities from CBC Sports to augment its on-television staff, including commentators Jim Hughson, Craig Simpson, Garry Galley, Bob Cole and Greg Millen, Coach's Corner hosts Don Cherry and Ron MacLean, and reporters Elliotte Friedman, and Scott Oake. Dave Randorf, Paul Romanuk, and Mike Johnson also jumped to Sportsnet from TSN to join the coverage, and, from 2014 to 2016, George Stroumboulopoulos, who formerly hosted a talk show for CBC, served as the studio host for Hockey Night in Canada in a bid to attract a younger demographic of viewers.

Rogers' inaugural season as sole rightsholder was met with mixed reception; while receiving praise—especially among younger viewers, for its "hipper" production and the increased number of games available on a national basis than under previous rights deals, initial criticism centred primarily upon the quality of George Stroumboulopoulos's hosting and his succession of Ron MacLean on Hockey Night (a move which was later reversed for the 2016–17 season), along with its use of elements perceived as being gimmicks.

== History ==
=== 1998–2002 contract and other previous contracts ===
Rogers Media's Sportsnet networks have historically been a prominent broadcaster of the National Hockey League in Canada. Initially launching as CTV Sportsnet in October 1998, the fledgling network had wrestled the national cable rights package away from the incumbent rights holder, TSN, in November 1997 for a figure reported as $36 million USD over four years, believed to be double what TSN had paid four years earlier. From 1998–99 until 2001–02, Sportsnet aired Labatt Blue Tuesday Night Hockey weekly during the regular season, and covered first-round playoff series that did not feature Canadian teams. The network's first live event was an opening night match between the Philadelphia Flyers and New York Rangers. Jim Hughson and Craig Simpson served as the lead broadcast team while Kevin Quinn and Ryan Walter served as the secondary team. Darren Dreger as the studio host and was joined by other personalities such as Greg Millen (1998–1999), Nick Kypreos (1998–2002), and Mike Keenan (1999–2000).

As reflected by its influence, Fox Sports Net (Fox also held a minority stake in the channel upon its launch), Sportsnet and its four regional feeds also picked up regional broadcast rights to other Canadian NHL teams. As of the 2013–14 NHL season, Sportsnet held regional rights to five of the seven Canadian franchises, including the Ottawa Senators, Toronto Maple Leafs (which are jointly owned by Rogers and Bell Canada through a majority stake in MLSE), Edmonton Oilers, Calgary Flames, and Vancouver Canucks. Rights to the remaining two, the Montreal Canadiens and Winnipeg Jets, and national cable rights to the league as a whole, were held by the competing network TSN. National broadcast television rights were held by CBC Television, who used its rights to broadcast the long-running Hockey Night in Canada on Saturday nights, and share coverage of the post-season with TSN (including exclusive rights to the Stanley Cup Finals).

=== 2014–26 contract ===
==== Negotiations ====
Logo from 2014 to 2021.

The National Hockey League had aimed for its next round of Canadian broadcast rights deals to total at least $3.2 billion. NHL commissioner Gary Bettman recognized the financial difficulties and budget cuts being faced by the CBC, despite the success of its NHL telecasts (which were responsible for at least half of CBC Television's total advertising revenue), by offering a slightly higher-valued contract that would have preserved a national doubleheader on Saturday nights (as opposed to regional games), along with playoff coverage, allowing the advertising-supported public broadcaster to maintain coverage of marquee games that could attract advertising revenue. Rights to the remaining properties not covered under the CBC's contract (including cable and digital rights) would have been offered to other broadcasters.

CBC Sports' staff, including executive director Jeffrey Orridge, in what was described as a "very aggressive bid", continued to insist that CBC have exclusivity for every Saturday night game involving Canadian teams. The CBC was ultimately unable to reach an agreement, and its exclusive negotiation window expired at the end of August 2013. which led to a bid by Bell Media for sole national rights to the NHL; Bell owns CTV, previous English cable rightsholder TSN, as well as previous French rightsholder RDS. Bell attempted to contact the CBC in regards to forming a partnership, but they did not respond. In turn, Rogers Communications prepared a bid of its own; on November 20, 2013, a group of seven Rogers executives, including then-CEO Nadir Mohamed, Keith Pelley, president of Rogers Media, and Rogers Broadcasting president Scott Moore, travelled to the NHL's offices in New York City to deliver a 90-minute presentation to the league and Commissioner Gary Bettman. Rogers would successfully reach a deal to become the exclusive national rightsholder for the National Hockey League in Canada.

The next day, CBC president Hubert Lacroix, who was in Montreal, was invited to an afternoon conference call with Neil McEneaney, Orridge, deputy commissioner Bill Daly, NHL chief operating officer John Collins, Bettman, and Pelley, in which CBC staff learned of the deal, but also of a proposal by Pelley for them to partner. Pelley, Moore, and senior vice-president of media sales Jack Tomik met with Orridge, McEneany, and CBC lawyer Jacques Gaboury in Toronto to begin negotiating a sub-licensing arrangement for Saturday night games. After several additional days of negotiations at a local hotel, a near-final proposal was completed on the Sunday, November 24, for presentation to Lacroix and the CBC's twelve-person board of directors the next day.

==== Announcement and inaugural season ====
On November 26, 2013, Rogers Communications publicly announced its 12-year deal to become the exclusive national rightsholder for the National Hockey League beginning in the 2014–15 season. Valued at $5.2 billion over the length of the contract, and covering television and digital rights to the league (national French rights were sub-licensed to Quebecor Media for TVA Sports), the value of the contract surpasses the league's most recent U.S. rights deal with NBC by more than double. Under the contract, Rogers paid $150 million upfront, and will make annual payments beginning at $300 million, escalating to $500 million over the life of the contract. As part of the deal, Rogers also took over Canadian distribution of the NHL Centre Ice and GameCentre Live services. Rogers Media president Keith Pelley emphasized the increased amount and accessibility of NHL content that Rogers planned to offer under the deal, stating that "Canadians will have more games, more content and more choice than they've ever had before." Also of note was Rogers' plans to maintain the long-running Hockey Night in Canada on CBC through a sub-licensing agreement with the league's previous broadcast television rightsholder, but also extend the brand by airing Hockey Night games across its own networks alongside CBC.

Critics considered the deal to be a major coup against Bell Media, showing concerns for how its sports networks, particularly TSN, could sustain themselves without what they considered to be a key sports property in Canada. TSN and RDS still retain some NHL coverage as of the 2014–15 season, including TSN's existing rights to the Winnipeg Jets, an extension of French-language rights to the Montreal Canadiens for RDS, along with newly introduced regional coverage of the Toronto Maple Leafs for TSN (which are split with Sportsnet per Bell and Rogers' joint majority ownership of its parent company), and the Ottawa Senators for both TSN and RDS.

On February 4, 2014, at the NHL's upfronts, Rogers unveiled more detailed plans for its NHL coverage. In preparation for the transition, Rogers and the NHL sought input from viewers via online surveys and a "listening tour" through locations within Canadian NHL markets, along with Kingston, Sudbury, and Red Deer, Alberta. These efforts focused primarily on gauging how viewers (including "core" fans, younger viewers, and those new to the country) consume NHL content, and help determine how Rogers would present, market, and distribute its overall coverage to these varying demographics. The hiring of George Stroumboulopoulos—the former host of a self-titled CBC talk show and an alumnus of the now-Rogers owned sports radio station CJCL—as the main on-air host of Hockey Night, was intended to help the telecasts appeal to a younger audience. Rogers also announced plans to use its multicultural Omni Television stations to broadcast a doubleheader of Hockey Night in Canada games with commentary in Punjabi (carrying over from CBC's past digital coverage of games in the language), and ancillary hockey content in 22 languages, such as Hockey 101—an instructional series explaining the basic rules and concepts of hockey.

As a part of the winning bid success, Rogers decided to host a three-day, pre-season employee seminar at Toronto's exclusive Shangri-La Hotel. It was followed up by a party at the Ritz-Carleton Hotel in September 2014.

Rogers sought to increase the prominence of NHL content on digital platforms by re-launching the NHL's digital out-of-market sports package GameCentre Live as Rogers NHL GameCentre Live, adding the ability to stream all of Rogers' national NHL telecasts, along with in-market streaming of regional games for teams whose regional rights are held by Sportsnet. GamePlus—an additional mode featuring alternate camera angles intended for a second screen experience, such as angles focusing on certain players, net and referee cameras, and a Skycam in selected venues, was also added exclusively for GameCentre Live subscribers who are subscribed to Rogers' cable, internet, or wireless services.

In the lead-up to the 2014–15 season, Rogers began to promote its networks as the new home of the NHL through a multi-platform advertising campaign; the campaign featured advertising and cross-promotions across Rogers' properties, such as The Shopping Channel, which began to feature presentations of NHL merchandise, and its parenting magazine Today's Parent, which began to feature hockey-themed stories in its issues. On May 28, 2014, Rogers announced a six-year sponsorship deal with Scotiabank, which saw the bank become the title sponsor for Wednesday Night Hockey and Hockey Day in Canada, and become a sponsor for other segments and initiatives throughout Rogers' NHL coverage.

Promotional banner during its first season.

Sportsnet's coverage premiered on October 8, 2014, with an opening night doubleheader of Scotiabank Wednesday Night Hockey, featuring the Montreal Canadiens at the Toronto Maple Leafs, followed by the Calgary Flames and the Vancouver Canucks. The inaugural game was the most-watched program of the night in Canada, and the most-watched telecast in Sportsnet's history, with 2.01 million viewers (beating the previous record of 1.44 million set by the Toronto Blue Jays' home opener in 2013, but since surpassed by multiple games of the 2015 American League Division Series involving the Blue Jays, which topped out at 4.38 million viewers for game 4). However, viewership was down from 2013's opening night game, which was televised by CBC.

==== Ultra high-definition ====
On October 5, 2015, Rogers announced that it planned to produce 101 Sportsnet telecasts in 4K ultra-high-definition format in 2016, including "marquee" NHL games.

Beginning with a January 23, 2016 Toronto Maple Leafs/Montreal Canadiens game as part of Hockey Night in Canada, Sportsnet planned to broadcast 8 regular season games in the 2015–16 season in 4K—all of which were hosted by Toronto, Montreal or Ottawa, as well as two playoff games to be determined. At the time, Bell Media and Rogers Media via the joint venture Dome Productions shared the only 4K-capable production unit operating in Canada, which was being used for Toronto Raptors NBA basketball and NHL games being televised by TSN and Sportsnet. Sportsnet chose to upconvert non-4K content to the format in its telecasts, arguing that using only 4K footage would hinder the telecast's ability to provide storytelling.

=== 2026–38 contract ===
On March 31, 2025, it was reported that Rogers was nearing an agreement to renew its contract for 12 additional seasons beginning in 2026–27; this contract would be valued at $11 billion, nearly double the value of the current deal. Rogers officially announced the agreement on April 2, 2025; most of the arrangements will remain similar to the current contract, although Rogers Sports & Media president Colette Watson noted that Rogers will have the ability to flex more regional games from the Sportsnet channels into national telecasts. On June 16, 2026, the CBC and Rogers jointly announced that they would not renew the sublicensing agreement for Hockey Night. It was also reported that Rogers will make all NHL broadcasts exclusive to Sportsnet, and no longer carry any games on over-the-air television.

Both Amazon Prime Video and TVA Sports renewed their sub-licensing agreements with Rogers for the entire 12 years, with Prime notably taking over the Wednesday Night Hockey window previously aired by Sportsnet, and adding rights to selected first- and second-round playoff series, as well as French-language rights to most of its games. Sportsnet will return to airing Monday Night Hockey, but it will be exclusive to its streaming platform Sportsnet+.

== Production ==
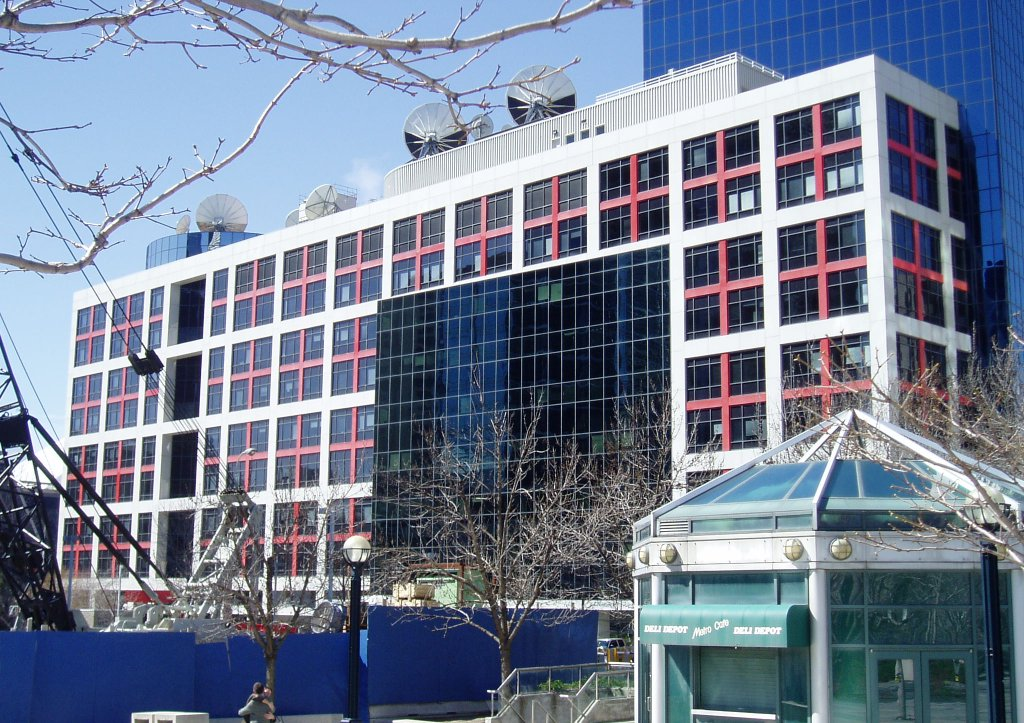
Sportsnet's NHL broadcasts were originally produced from the Canadian Broadcasting Centre, before moving in 2021.

Sportsnet's NHL broadcasts, along with its studio show Hockey Central, initially originated from the Canadian Broadcasting Centre, the headquarters of former rightsholder CBC. Rogers rented Studio 41 of the facility, which is adjacent to Studio 42, the previous home of Hockey Night in Canada, to build an 11,000 square-foot studio for its NHL programming. The $4.5 million set, designed by Jack Morton/PDG, features fourteen cameras, a 38 feet (12 m) wide, 11 feet (3.4 m) high arc-shaped video wall nicknamed the "Goliath", and 9 distinct set areas that serve various functions. The set areas included a central, rotating desk, three separate set areas for regional games and other segments, a "demo wall" (a video wall with a screen under the floor directly in front of it; virtual ice markings can be projected on the floor for play analysis), an interactive "puck wall" that can display stats for specific teams by placing their corresponding puck prop into a reader. During his tenure as host, the set featured an informal interview area intended for Stroumboulopoulos, which featured red armchairs as an homage to his previous talk show. The studio could produce broadcasts for up to three channels at once using its various sets and cameras.

Sportsnet staff emphasized a focus on storytelling throughout its NHL coverage, with a particular focus on the personal lives of the league's top players. Although Sportsnet executive Scott Moore did explain that Sportsnet's overall goal was to "celebrate" hockey and downplay some of the NHL's recent issues, such as labour disputes, he emphasized that the network would not be the NHL's "cheerleaders", and would still be prepared to discuss issues that affect the game. Sportsnet's coverage also places an emphasis on new technology; referees can be equipped with helmet cams for first-person perspectives, and a Skycam was installed at Air Canada Centre for use in aerial shots. Rogers plans to install Skycam units at each Canadian NHL arena for use in its coverage and the GameCentre Live GamePlus features.

In June 2021, Rogers announced that it would move its NHL studio from the Canadian Broadcasting Centre to the Rogers Building for the 2021–22 season. Two new sets were constructed as part of the "Sportsnet Studios" project, with one area incorporating a 50 foot (15 metres) curved video wall, as well as support for a virtual set extension via green screens, and augmented reality graphics. A new on-air graphics package was also adopted, as well as new theme music by the alternative rock duo Ubiquitous Synergy Seeker (USS).

== Coverage ==
As of the 2026–27 season, Sportsnet's flagship national broadcast is Rogers Saturday Night Hockey, which airs a doubleheader on Saturday nights throughout the regular season highlighting Canadian teams. Monday Night Hockey streams exclusively on Sportsnet+, requiring a paid add-on for those subscribing to Sportsnet through TV providers other than Rogers and its subsidiaries. Sportsnet's coverage also includes coverage of events such as the All-Star Game, and outdoor games (including the Heritage Classic, Winter Classic, and Stadium Series). Alongside these three weekly broadcasts, Sportsnet also carries games simulcast from U.S. regional or national broadcasters, as well as Canadian regional games flexed to national broadcasts.

From 2014 to 2026, Sportsnet's coverage was divided between three weekly windows:

- Scotiabank Wednesday Night Hockey, a weekly doubleheader.
- Hockey Night in Canada; the long-running series continued to serve as Sportsnet's flagship weekly broadcast, featuring multiple games airing across Sportsnet, CBC Television, and Citytv, as well as a Punjabi language altcast on Omni Television.
- Rogers Hometown Hockey, a "game of the week" broadcast with a travelling pre-game show hosted by Ron MacLean and Tara Slone, which highlighted local players and teams. The game initially aired on Sunday nights on Citytv during the inaugural season, but moved exclusively to Sportsnet beginning in the 2015–16 season. Hometown Hockey moved to Monday nights for the 2021–22 season. After that season, the window was relaunched as simply Rogers Monday Night Hockey, which carried a more conventional format, and offered an altcast with enhanced statistics and analytics.
  - On April 25, 2024, Rogers announced a sub-licensing agreement with Amazon, under which the Monday-night games would move to Prime Video under a two-year agreement beginning in the 2024–25 NHL season

=== Hockey Night in Canada (2014–2026) ===
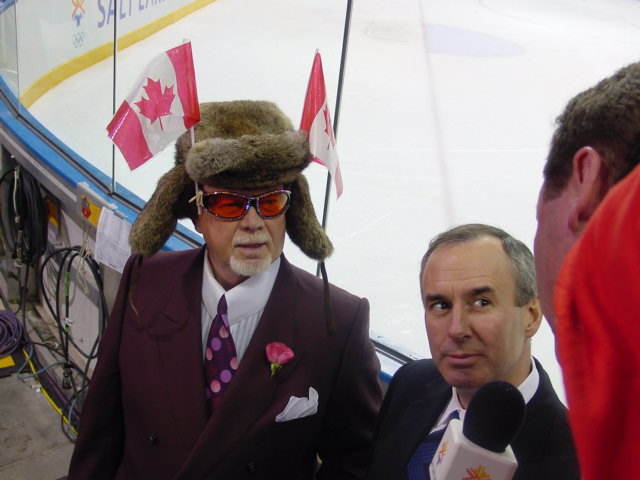
Don Cherry (until 2019) and Ron MacLean (pictured in 2002) are among the Hockey Night in Canada talent retained by Rogers.

Hockey Night in Canada remained in its traditional Saturday night timeslot, but rather than having games split across CBC Television stations on a regional basis, multiple games were broadcast nationally, split across CBC, Citytv, and the Sportsnet networks. FX Canada was also initially involved, with the channel typically airing an all-U.S. game. Three to five games aired during the early, 7 p.m. ET window, and two more aired on Sportsnet and CBC for the 10 p.m. ET/7 p.m. PT west coast window. Rogers estimated a 300% increase in the number of Hockey Night games available nationally under the new arrangement. Though split national/regional broadcasts were possible, arrangements would be made to ensure that viewers have on-air access to any games affected, ensuring that no Saturday night game was unavailable to viewers on a regional basis. Alongside HNIC, CBC also broadcast the NHL Winter Classic and All-Star Game during the 2014–15 season. The Winter Classic was removed from CBC's package and moved to Sportsnet for 2016.

CBC's games were no longer produced by CBC Sports and Rogers sold all advertising during the telecasts, but CBC was still provided with advertising time for its own programming. While CBC did not pay a rights fee to either Rogers or the NHL, the public broadcaster did not receive any revenue from the telecasts, aside from payments by Rogers for its use of certain CBC personalities and ancillary staff, and its rent of studio space. In order to assign responsibility for the content of the telecasts, compliance with regulatory guidelines, and advertising to Rogers, its NHL telecasts on CBC were legally considered to be broadcast by a part-time television network owned by the Sportsnet subsidiary, which is affiliated with CBC's English-language television stations. A license for this arrangement was approved by the Canadian Radio-television and Telecommunications Commission in April 2015.

Some of CBC's personalities and production staff were retained for the new Hockey Night in Canada—certain staff members, such as producers Joel Darling and Sherali Najak, remain employed by the CBC, while some jumped to Rogers entirely. From 2014 through the 2015–16 season, Ron MacLean was replaced as host by George Stroumboulopoulos. Ron MacLean and Don Cherry continued to present their traditional Coach's Corner segment during the first intermission of Hockey Night games up until November 9, 2019.

CBC President Hubert T. Lacroix, in notifying CBC employees of the deal in an internal memo, noted that the new sub-licensing arrangement with Rogers "may not be the ideal scenario [for the CBC] but, it is the right outcome for Canadian hockey fans", as it allowed the NHL and the Hockey Night in Canada brand to remain on CBC and be made available to a wider audience with minimal cost to the public broadcaster, which has gone through reductions in funding in recent years. Lacroix, in his memo, believed that CBC's non-hockey content would remain well-promoted on the new Hockey Night, and that being shut out of the package entirely would have been a major blow to the CBC's prestige. In turn, CBC announced in April 2014 that it would cut a total of 657 jobs across its divisions, and no longer pursue broadcast rights to professional sporting events. The loss of Hockey Night was cited as a factor to the budget cuts, but was also credited to the performance of CBC's entertainment programming.

The sub-licensing deal was initially announced as lasting for four years; CBC staff described the agreement as a means of providing a "structured exit from hockey" in the event that Rogers does not extend the agreement. The deal was also considered a low-cost means of allowing CBC to maintain a level of major sports output in the lead-up to future Olympic Games and the 2015 Pan-American Games, whose rights are owned outright by CBC. In the case of the Olympics, CBC's coverage is sub-licensed to Rogers and Bell Media networks under a similar time-brokerage and production subsidization arrangement. In 2017, The Globe and Mail reported that the CBC and Rogers had quietly extended the agreement into a fifth season, while Moore stated that he wished to extend the partnership further. On December 19, 2017, Rogers announced that it had renewed this arrangement through the remainder of its current NHL contract.

The CBC and Rogers would not renew the agreement beyond the 2025–26 season.

=== Regional coverage ===
As of the 2019–20 season, Sportsnet's regional feeds collectively hold regional broadcast rights to four of the seven Canadian NHL franchises: the Toronto Maple Leafs on Sportsnet Ontario (split with TSN4), the Calgary Flames and Edmonton Oilers on Sportsnet West, and the Vancouver Canucks on Sportsnet Pacific. The Montreal Canadiens, Ottawa Senators, and Winnipeg Jets have regional television deals with TSN, and the Buffalo Sabres' Canadian regional rights are held by TSN parent company Bell Canada.

Unlike Sportsnet's national games, these games are subject to blackout outside of the teams' home markets. These games can be watched out of market on NHL Centre Ice or Rogers NHL Live. In-market streaming of regional games on Sportsnet is also available on Rogers NHL Live. Due to its ownership of the national contract, Rogers has a monopoly on all English-language telecasts of teams whose regional rights are exclusively owned by Sportsnet.

A select number of regional Sportsnet games may be aired nationally on the network's sister channels (usually Sportsnet One, Sportsnet 360 or an out-of-market Sportsnet channel). With a few exceptions (e.g. NHL opening week), Sportsnet rarely airs nationally televised doubleheaders of Rogers Monday Night Hockey and Scotiabank Wednesday Night Hockey; some dates feature multiple games broadcast at the same time across different Sportsnet national and regional channels. Instead, Sportsnet uses the late-game national window to air either a team-specific broadcast (e.g. Oilers Hockey on Sportsnet), or a simulcast of an American TV network whenever they schedule all-U.S. matchups. In the case of all-Canadian matchups (e.g. Battle of Alberta, Canucks–Flames rivalry), most markets, including the host city, may receive the home team's broadcast. For instance, if a Canucks–Flames game in Calgary is aired nationally, a majority of the markets would receive the Flames' home broadcast, while only the Vancouver market would receive the Canucks' road broadcast.

In the 2013–14 season, Sportsnet lost the Senators to TSN, but acquired rights to the Canadiens to replace them on Sportsnet East under a three-year deal. The contract expired after the 2016–17 season, and the team moved to TSN2 the following season; TSN's owner Bell holds an ownership stake in the Canadiens, as well as its regional French-language rights. Both Rogers and Bell own stakes in the Maple Leafs and split broadcast rights between them.

On January 6, 2021, Rogers announced extended regional rights agreements with both the Edmonton Oilers and the Calgary Flames under the terms of a new multi-year deal.

On April 7, 2025, following the passing of former NHL player and Sportsnet announcer Greg Millen, Sportsnet decided not to produce their own broadcast of a Calgary Flames road game at the San Jose Sharks out of respect to Millen. They instead carried a feed of the Sharks' home network, NBC Sports California.

=== Post-season ===
Under the new 12-year contracts signed in 2026, Sportsnet's coverage of the Stanley Cup playoffs will see them air six first round and three second round series each year, with Sportsnet having the first and last three choices of which series to air, with Prime Video selecting the fourth and fifth options. In the second round, Sportsnet has the first, second and fourth options of which series to air, with Prime Video selecting the third option. The Canadian broadcast of the conference finals and Stanley Cup Final will be exclusive to Sportsnet.

From 2014 to 2026, Sportsnet networks and CBC shared in coverage of the Stanley Cup playoffs under the Hockey Night in Canada banner. Typically, first and second round series involving Canadian teams and some high-profile all-American series are broadcast on CBC and Sportsnet, with Rogers providing broadcast crews for these series. Other series use the broadcast feed from the American networks. Selected games are simulcast with Punjabi-language commentary on Omni Television. All games from the conference finals onward are simulcast with CBC.

Like in the previous national deal with CBC and TSN, the league still gives U.S. rights-holders (ESPN, ABC and TNT hold the national American TV rights as of 2021) the first choice of games and times during the playoffs. As then-rightsholder NBC preferred afternoon playoff games on the weekends, there were at least two Saturdays in May 2015 that did not have a post-season night game. In the alternating years where ABC is the broadcaster of the Stanley Cup Final, its coverage is simulcasted on Citytv as an alternate to the CBC/Sportsnet broadcast, allowing Rogers to enforce simultaneous substitution rights on the feeds of ABC affiliates that are retransmitted within Canada.

=== World Cup of Hockey ===
Sportsnet and TVA Sports held broadcast rights to the 2016 World Cup of Hockey, organized by the NHL and the NHL Players Association. Although it was initially reported that Rogers was allowed to match competing bids for the rights per its NHL rights contract, blocking a competing bid by TSN, NHL Commissioner Gary Bettman denied that there was such a stipulation, and that the bidding process was "competitive". Similarly to HNIC, CBC aired Sportsnet-produced coverage of the tournament's semi-finals and final series.

== Personalities ==
While primarily using existing Sportsnet talent, a number of CBC Sports personalities, including the lead play-by-play crew of Jim Hughson, Craig Simpson and, until 2016, Glenn Healy, veteran play-by-play man Bob Cole, rinkside reporter Scott Oake and studio analyst Elliotte Friedman, joined Rogers to participate in Sportsnet's coverage and Hockey Night. These CBC alumni are joined by two former TSN personalities, Dave Randorf and Paul Romanuk.

From 2014 to 2016, George Stroumboulopoulos served as the studio host for Hockey Night in Canada. Caroline Cameron hosts Wednesday Night Hockey, while she also hosts Thursday night games along with Hockey Central Saturday. As of the 2026–27 season, Ron MacLean was reinstated as Hockey Night host (shared with David Amber from 2016 to 2022); he continued to co-host the traditional Coach's Corner segment with Don Cherry until 2019, while MacLean served as the on-location host for Hometown Hockey, accompanied by Citytv Calgary's Breakfast Television host Tara Slone until 2022. MacLean and Oake are still under contract with the CBC, with MacLean through at least 2016 for the 2016 Summer Olympics.

Sportsnet did not give any on-air assignments to Bob Cole during the 2018 playoffs—an exclusion that caught the veteran commentator off-guard, forcing Cole to retire the following season. Over the 2018 off-season, Paul Romanuk departed Sportsnet, while John Bartlett (who called regional Montreal Canadiens games with Sportsnet through the 2016–17 season, and for the 2017–18 season with TSN2) returned to Sportsnet to call national games and regional Toronto Maple Leafs games. Meanwhile, studio host Daren Millard also left Sportsnet that year, eventually joining the Vegas Golden Knights television team the next year.

In August 2019, long-time Sportsnet NHL analysts Nick Kypreos, Doug MacLean and John Shannon left the network.

On November 11, 2019, Don Cherry was fired by Sportsnet after controversial remarks relating to Canadian immigrants he made during the November 9 Coach's Corner broadcast.

On June 5, 2020, Sportsnet announced that it had hired TSN commentator and former Hockey Night in Canada broadcaster Chris Cuthbert. Cuthbert replaced both Dave Randorf (no. 2 announcer) and John Bartlett (Maple Leafs regional announcer); Randorf left Sportsnet to join the Tampa Bay Lightning as its television voice, while Bartlett continued to call select national games. Greg Millen, who like Bartlett was also reassigned to national game duty, was replaced by Craig Simpson on the Maple Leafs' regional broadcasts.

During the 2020–21 season, Cuthbert filled-in for Jim Hughson as the lead play-by-play voice of Sportsnet after Hughson opted to call only nationally televised Canucks home games and was promoted full-time the following season after Hughson's retirement. Meanwhile, HNIC Punjabi-language voice Harnarayan Singh was promoted to secondary play-by-play announcer, filling in the role originally given to Cuthbert and fully replaced Cuthbert full-time.

In the summer of 2021, Sportsnet talents Cassie Campbell-Pascall and Leah Hextall joined the NHL on ESPN broadcast team in the U.S. Similar to the situation involving then-TSN and fellow ESPN analyst Ray Ferraro, Campbell-Pascall and Hextall would continue to work with Sportsnet whilst making occasional appearances south of the border on ESPN. In 2023, Ferraro joined Sportsnet on a part-time basis, mainly serving as a substitute to new Canucks television analyst Dave Tomlinson. Fellow Sportsnet analyst Jennifer Botterill, who mainly works in the studio, also worked several games for American audiences with the NHL on TNT.

Before the 2024–25 season, Rick Ball left Sportsnet to join the Chicago Blackhawks broadcasts on the new Chicago Sports Network; his position with both the Calgary Flames and Sportsnet was filled in by Jon Abbott.

Before the 2026-27 season, Kelly Hrudey left both Sportsnet and the Calgary Flames and is replaced by former TSN hockey analyst Kevin Sawyer. Jennifer Botterill also left Sportsnet after her contract was not renewed.

== Reception ==
Raju Mudhar of the Toronto Star felt that, especially during intermission segments, Rogers' broadcasts had a faster pace and were relatively "busier" than those of CBC, explaining that "[they] spent $4.5 million on a new set, and it feels like they want to show off every bit so they get their money's worth, with George Stroumboulopoulos walking around and the puck wall in particular feeling gimmicky."

In a November 2014 poll by the Angus Reid Institute, 60% of 1,504 adults surveyed felt that George Stroumboulopoulos was not a "credible replacement" for Ron MacLean on Hockey Night in Canada, and 74% of those surveyed felt that Rogers' moves to reduce his role on Hockey Night had hurt its brand. MacLean compared the reaction to Stroumboulopoulos on Hockey Night to his own introduction in 1987 following the firing of Dave Hodge, and presumed that the reaction then may have been just as bad, if not worse, than the reaction to Stroumboulopoulos. However, MacLean credited the work of his colleagues Bob Cole, Dick Irvin, Jr., and Don Cherry for helping maintain the integrity of Hockey Night in Canada under his tenure as host, and felt that "George will be fine."

During a survey conducted in December 2014 in which participants were asked to rate the quality of Rogers' NHL coverage on a scale of 1 to 10, those surveyed gave the telecasts an average score of 6.1 out of 10. Reviews were more positive among younger demographics (such as teens and millennials who gave an average score of 6.5 out of 10), citing the expanded availability of games, the "hipper" feel of the telecasts and how they are produced, but were lower among older viewers. Criticism was directed primarily towards how the contract affected the availability of Montreal Canadiens games and other French-language broadcasts, the "gimmicky" feel of their production, and the presence of George Stroumboulopoulos—who received an average rating of 5.7 out of 10 on the survey and, again, received relatively better reception among younger viewers with an average score of 6.2 out of 10.

Rogers' use of CBC's television stations as part of the deal also received criticism from other broadcasters and advocacy groups. They argued that Rogers' sub-licensing deal would harm the broadcaster's viability due to its inability to collect further advertising revenue from its most popular program. The Globe and Mail wrote that CBC's sub-licensing deal also effectively "handcuffs" the public broadcaster during the playoffs, as CBC would not have significant ad revenue of its own for several weeks due to the almost nightly games being played. During Rogers' request for a separate network license for Hockey Night in Canada, the CRTC received interventions asking them to require that Rogers provide additional financial compensation to the CBC for airing its content. The Public Interest Advocacy Centre and the Council of Senior Citizens' Organizations of British Columbia also argued that the agreement was not in the public interest, as it meant only to leverage the Hockey Night brand and legacy as part of the transition to Rogers as the national rightsholder. The CRTC ruled against these interventions, arguing that the agreement allowed CBC to continue filling a large portion of its schedule with programming that would have been otherwise displaced by the complete loss of NHL content, at little to no cost.

On June 19, 2016, the Toronto Star reported that Rogers planned to reinstate Ron MacLean as host of Hockey Night in Canada for the 2016–17 season. On July 27, 2016, Sportsnet confirmed the changes, announcing that MacLean would host both the early-window games and Hometown Hockey beginning in the 2016–17 season. David Amber took over as host of the west coast games. The previous post-game show After Hours (traditionally aired after the late game in the doubleheader) was also revived; Sportsnet vice-president of production Rob Corte explained that these changes were meant to return Hockey Night to a "grassroots" feel.

=== Viewership ===
Ratings for Rogers' inaugural season of NHL broadcasts were mixed in comparison to the previous CBC and TSN arrangements. Rogers had aimed for a 20% increase in overall viewership for national NHL broadcasts during its first season as rightsholder. During the first two months of its inaugural season, Numeris estimated an increase in average viewership for Wednesday night games and east coast games on Hockey Night (with the latter averaging 2.18 million viewers), and a 9% increase in the number of viewers who have watched at least part of a game. However, viewership of west coast games during Hockey Night fell by 17%; Moore argued that this was a side effect of the new format for Hockey Night, as the audience is "splintered" by those who do not switch channels to watch the late games (as opposed to the previous arrangement, in which all games were solely aired by CBC, thus all the early games would lead into the late game). In total, these numbers were behind Rogers' expectations.

Although a 67% improvement over the entertainment programs formerly broadcast by City on Sunday nights, ratings for the first eight Hometown Hockey games were modest and lower than expected by Rogers, with only two games (its debut game, and an Ottawa Senators/Toronto Maple Leafs game on November 9, 2014, which had been rescheduled from a Wednesday night game following the Parliament Hill shootings) surpassing one million viewers. Moore admitted that the Sunday primetime games were a new concept that still needed time to establish, again drawing comparisons to Sunday Night Football, but that they were succeeding in their goal of attracting more viewership to City.

By January 2015, average viewership for Hockey Night east-coast games fell to 1.69 million viewers, in comparison to the average 1.8 million that CBC brought at the same point in the previous season; the poor performance of the heavily viewed Toronto Maple Leafs was partially blamed for the decline. Ratings for the 2015 NHL All-Star Game also fell sharply, losing over half its viewers in comparison to the 2012 edition. Moore disputed the accuracy of Numeris's numbers, arguing that they did not properly account for multi-platform viewership, and that its ratings panel did not cover enough sports-oriented demographics. Numeris acknowledged that it would look into Rogers' complaints, but noted that its ratings panels were meant to represent a wide array of Canadian demographics, and that, although they are not yet reported separately, its ratings did account for viewership on digital platforms. The Maple Leafs' ratings would fall as low as 743,000 viewers. Aggregate ratings began to recover by March; the March 21 east coast games (which saw the Maple Leafs' game moved to Sportsnet in favor of a Montreal Canadiens game on CBC) drew aggregate ratings of around 2.2 million viewers across CBC, City, and Sportsnet, with the Canadiens bringing 922,000 viewers.

Viewership rebounded for the 2015 Stanley Cup playoffs, with five Canadian teams involved in the first round; average viewership of first-round games increased over the previous season, with one of the games in the Ottawa Senators and Montreal Canadiens' first round series on CBC seen by 3.76 million viewers. However, following the elimination of all Canadian teams from contention, ratings dropped significantly, with Numeris estimating an overall decrease of 8% in average viewership on CBC, and a 14% decrease in average viewership for Sportsnet in comparison to TSN's 2014 playoff coverage. With 2.62 million viewers, game six of the Stanley Cup Finals was the lowest-rated deciding game since game seven in 2003; the game competed against a match of the 2015 FIFA Women's World Cup involving Team Canada on CTV and TSN (1.8 million), and a Toronto Blue Jays/New York Mets game on Sportsnet (782,000; the team was in the midst of a major winning streak).

The 2015–16 season saw major ratings declines, with Hockey Night in Canada down 18%, Hometown Hockey down 34%, and ratings for the 2016 Stanley Cup playoffs were down by 61% over the first five days of play, as no Canadian team made the playoffs for the first time since 1970. The lack of Canadian teams resulted in cuts to coverage; Sportsnet used just three dedicated play-by-play crews during the first round (with a fourth used for select games) and only produced its own coverage for games which aired on the CBC (all other games were simulcast from U.S. broadcasters).

In 2017, five Canadian teams qualified for the first round of the playoffs, which was expected to improve ratings. Scott Moore told The New York Times that he was extremely positive over the large number of Canadian teams in contention—this time including the top Canadian media market of Toronto. He warned that "there's going to be a year where Edmonton is playing Montreal in the Stanley Cup Finals, and someone will think I'm a genius."

In 2018, while only two Canadian teams made the playoffs, they once again included the Maple Leafs, as well as the Winnipeg Jets—who ultimately advanced to the Western Conference final, but were defeated by the Vegas Golden Knights in their inaugural season. Sportsnet stated that the Jets' second-round series had an average of 2.2 million viewers.

=== GamePlus dispute ===
The GamePlus features added to the Rogers NHL GameCentre Live service provide additional in-game camera angles for subscribers who also subscribe to Rogers' cable, internet, or wireless services. In October 2014, Bell filed a complaint with the Canadian Radio-television and Telecommunications Commission (CRTC), arguing that the exclusivity of GamePlus to Rogers subscribers was anti-competitive and showed undue preference. Bell felt that the exclusivity violated a CRTC ruling banning vertically integrated telecommunications companies from being the exclusive distributor of television content on internet and mobile television platforms, as footage from these additional angles are occasionally incorporated into the linear telecast.

Rogers objected, arguing that GamePlus was an interactive second screen experience that is separate from the telecast by nature. Rogers' CEO Guy Lawrence also accused Bell of attempting to "stifle innovation in hockey", and suggested that its actions were in retaliation for TSN's loss of national cable rights to the NHL. On March 17, 2015, the CRTC dismissed the complaint and ruled in favour of Rogers, affirming that the GamePlus content was not "mainly" intended for television, and thus not subject to the non-exclusivity rules.

For the 2018–19 season, Rogers discontinued the free trials, subscriptions, and additional GamePlus features to Rogers' cable, internet, and wireless service users, and required all users to pay the regular fees.

=== Monday Night Hockey issues ===
The transition to Rogers' renewed contract in the 2026–27 season faced criticism for the additional paywalling of nationally-televised games behind streaming—including the sublicensing agreement with Amazon, discontinuation of Hockey Night in Canada, and the move of Monday Night Hockey to Sportsnet+—which a Globe and Mail writer compared to shrinkflation in comparison to the previous agreement due to the removal of games from linear subscription television. Of particular criticism is that subscribers to Sportsnet via most television providers are required to pay for an additional add-on subscription (which also includes additional all-U.S. games) in order to access Monday Night Hockey on Sportsnet+, but this add-on is included at no additional charge for Rogers Xfinity customers, and the provider also added several part-time Sportsnet+ linear channels to carry the add-on content.

In November 2026, Cogeco, Eastlink, and SaskTel filed a complaint with the CRTC demanding that the add-on content be offered at no additional cost to all other television providers, accusing Rogers of violating a condition of its 2023 acquisition of Shaw Communications prohibiting the merged company from entering into any agreement for "exclusive or referential distribution of any online programming service or rights necessary for its distribution". The providers argued that Rogers was engaging in "predatory siphoning" of programming and "deliberately degrading the user experience on other distributors' platforms", arguing that its conduct "forces Canadian households into mandatory fee-stacking, and distorts fair market dynamics." A Sportsnet spokesperson stated that Rogers Xfinity "paid Sportsnet fair market value to provide Sportsnet+ exclusive content to their TV customers and decided to make it available to them at no extra cost", and that the providers "have the same opportunity to make the content available as part of their TV offering, but so far have chosen not to."

| Preceded by TSN | NHL English pay television carrier in Canada; 1998–2002 | Succeeded by TSN |
| Preceded by TSN | NHL English pay television carrier in Canada; 2014–present with Prime Video (2024–present) | Succeeded by none |
