= Nick Kypreos =

Canadian ice hockey player (born 1966)

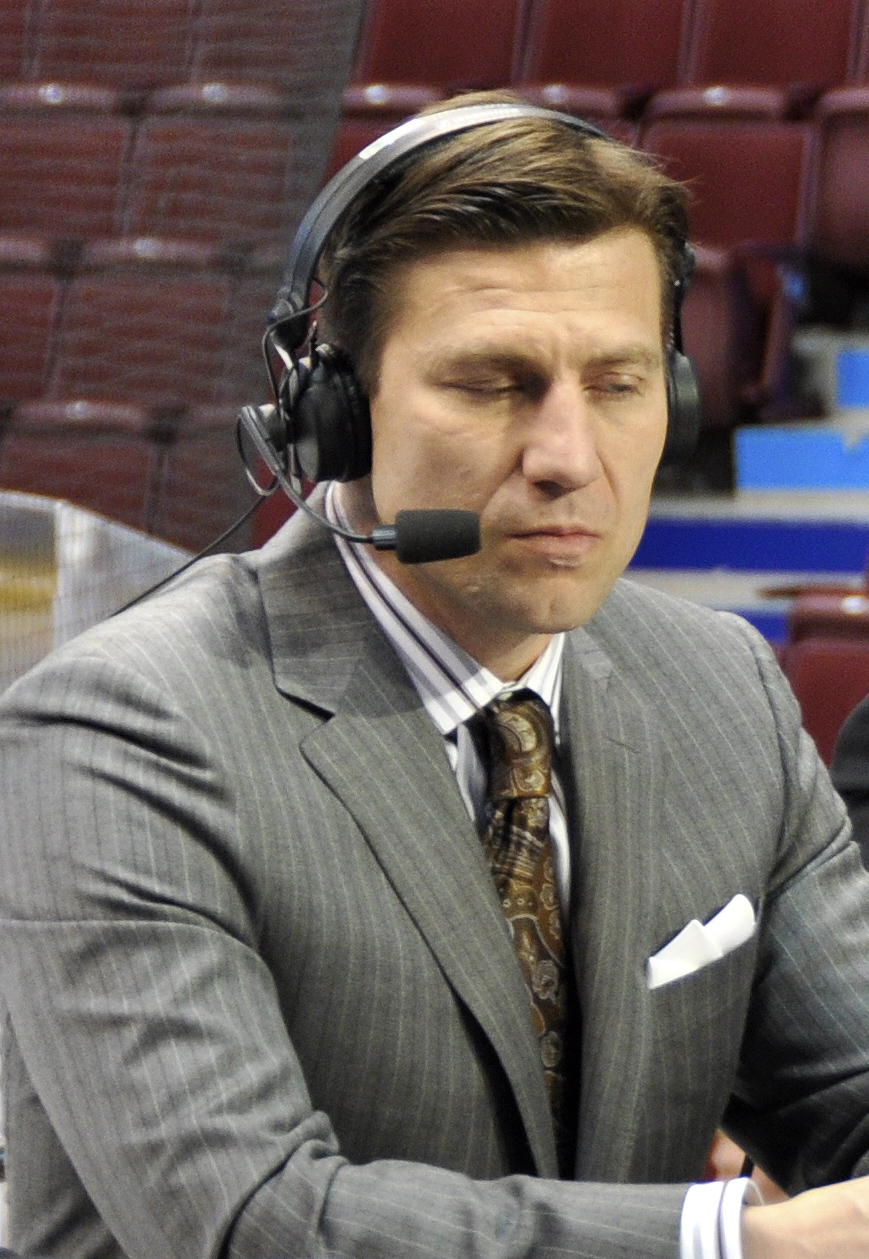
- Kypreos at the 2010 Winter Olympics
- Born: June 4, 1966 (age 60) Toronto, Ontario, Canada
- Height: 6 ft 0 in (183 cm)
- Weight: 211 lb (96 kg; 15 st 1 lb)
- Position: Left wing
- Shot: Left
- Played for: Washington Capitals; Hartford Whalers; New York Rangers; Toronto Maple Leafs
- NHL draft: Undrafted
- Playing career: 1986–1997

Nikos "Nick" Kypreos (born June 4, 1966) is a Canadian former professional ice hockey left winger who played eight seasons in the National Hockey League (NHL) for the Hartford Whalers, Washington Capitals, New York Rangers and Toronto Maple Leafs. He is currently a hockey analyst on the Sportsnet cable television network in Canada.

== Playing career ==
Of Greek descent, Kypreos was born in Toronto, Ontario. As a youth, he played in the 1979 Quebec International Pee-Wee Hockey Tournament with a minor ice hockey team from Wexford, Toronto. He was an effective goal scorer in juniors with the North Bay Centennials of the Ontario Hockey League (OHL). He was a prolific scorer and finished second in the league for goals scored, with 62, in the 1985–86 OHL season, leading the top scoring Centennials to second place in the regular season.

Kypreos struggled to score at the NHL level and immediately became known as an enforcer, a role he maintained throughout his pro career. He was never drafted by an NHL team, but was signed as a free agent by the Philadelphia Flyers on the eve of his second junior season. However, his NHL career began with the Washington Capitals. His best NHL season came in 1992–93 while a member of the Hartford Whalers, when he scored a career-best 17 goals while earning 325 penalty minutes, which was the fourth-highest penalty minute total in the league that season.

In 1994, Kypreos was a member of the Stanley Cup champion New York Rangers.

He made his final NHL stop with his hometown Toronto Maple Leafs. As a Maple Leaf, his career ended as the result of a concussion sustained in a fight with the Rangers' Ryan VandenBussche in a pre-season game on September 15, 1997, when his face hit the ice after he was punched unconscious. After the injury, Kypreos suffered from post-concussion syndrome and was forced to retire. He finished his NHL career with 46 goals, 44 assists, 90 points, and 1,210 penalty minutes in 442 regular season games.

== Television career ==
Since retiring as a player, Kypreos had gone on to serve as a hockey analyst for Sportsnet in Canada, as the co-host of Hockey Central (first with Darren Dreger and later with Daren Millard). He also co-hosts Hockey Central at Noon on The Fan 590 in Toronto and simulcast on Sportsnet as of 2018. Hockey Central at Noon is hosted by Jeff Marek. The show was previously co-hosted by Daren Millard and Bill Berg until the fall of 2008, when Berg left and was replaced by Mike Brophy. Starting in the fall of 2009, former NHL coach and executive Doug MacLean was also added to the program as an analyst. His role was expanded in October 2014 when he became part of the new but revamped Hockey Night in Canada as an analyst after its parent, Rogers Media acquired the sole national television rights to the NHL in November 2013, until he departed in 2019.

Kypreos has also appeared on TSN as an analyst, notably when Hockey Canada announced the Canadian national team for the 2010 Winter Olympics.

Kypreos appeared as a pro hockey player, acting in a 1996 episode of the HBO program Arli$$ entitled "What About the Fans?".

== Awards and achievements ==
- 1987–88: Calder Cup champion (Hershey Bears)
- 1993–94: Stanley Cup champion (New York Rangers)

== Career statistics ==
			Regular season					Playoffs
Season	Team	League	GP	G	A	Pts	PIM	GP	G	A	Pts	PIM
1983–84	Dixie Beehives	OPJHL	9	3	7	10	12	—	—	—	—	—
1983–84	Kitchener Rangers	OHL	4	2	0	2	0	—	—	—	—	—
1983–84	North Bay Centennials	OHL	47	10	11	21	36	4	3	2	5	9
1984–85	North Bay Centennials	OHL	64	41	36	77	71	8	2	2	4	15
1985–86	North Bay Centennials	OHL	64	62	35	97	112	—	—	—	—	—
1986–87	Hershey Bears	AHL	10	0	1	1	4	—	—	—	—	—
1986–87	North Bay Centennials	OHL	46	49	41	90	54	24	11	5	16	78
1987–88	Hershey Bears	AHL	71	24	20	44	101	12	0	2	2	17
1988–89	Hershey Bears	AHL	28	12	15	27	19	12	4	5	9	11
1989–90	Baltimore Skipjacks	AHL	14	6	5	11	6	7	4	1	5	17
1989–90	Washington Capitals	NHL	31	5	4	9	82	7	1	0	1	15
1990–91	Washington Capitals	NHL	79	9	9	18	196	9	0	1	1	38
1991–92	Washington Capitals	NHL	65	4	6	10	206	—	—	—	—	—
1992–93	Hartford Whalers	NHL	75	17	10	27	325	—	—	—	—	—
1993–94	Hartford Whalers	NHL	10	0	0	0	37	—	—	—	—	—
1993–94	New York Rangers	NHL	46	3	5	8	102	3	0	0	0	2
1994–95	New York Rangers	NHL	40	1	3	4	93	10	0	2	2	6
1995–96	New York Rangers	NHL	42	3	4	7	77	—	—	—	—	—
1995–96	Toronto Maple Leafs	NHL	19	1	1	2	30	5	0	0	0	4
1996–97	St. John's Maple Leafs	AHL	4	0	0	0	4	—	—	—	—	—
1996–97	Toronto Maple Leafs	NHL	35	3	2	5	62	—	—	—	—	—
NHL totals			442	46	44	90	1210	34	1	3	4	65
