= Justin Bourne =

Canadian/American sportswriter

- Born: December 12, 1982 (age 43) Kelowna, British Columbia, .
- Height: 6 ft 2 in (188 cm)
- Weight: 195 lb (88 kg; 13 st 13 lb)
- Position: Forward
- Shot: Right
- Played for: Bridgeport Sound Tigers
- NHL draft: Undrafted
- Playing career: 2006–2009

Justin Bourne (born December 12, 1982) is a Canadian-American sportswriter. A former professional ice hockey player, he has also coached professionally, most recently as an assistant coach for the Toronto Marlies of the American Hockey League (AHL).

== Playing career ==
Bourne played collegiate hockey for the University of Alaska Anchorage before turning professional during the final weeks of the 2006–07 season with the ECHL's Alaska Aces. He was signed the following year by the Utah Grizzlies, going on to score 10 goals and 10 assists in a 17-game stretch, and playing in the 2008 ECHL All-Star game. After a brief run in the 2008–09 season, his professional career ended after 86 games over three seasons, with five different minor league teams, including 16 games at the AHL-level with the Bridgeport Sound Tigers.

== Writing career ==
Bourne's writing career began after a serious jaw injury forced him into retirement. USA Today, his articles have been featured across brands including Greg Wyshynski's Puck Daddy, The Hockey News, Hockey Primetime, as well as various other newspapers and websites.

Bourne eventually joined The Score as a featured writer and stats analyst, as well as a senior hockey columnist for The Athletic and Sportsnet.

== Coaching career ==
On November 25, 2015, Bourne left his position at The Score to become an assistant coach for the Toronto Marlies of the American Hockey League, working with the team's video coaching for two seasons.

== Personal life ==
Bourne's father Bob won the Stanley Cup four times as a centre for the New York Islanders. Bourne is currently married to Brianna, daughter of former NHL all-star Clark Gillies.

== Career statistics ==
			Regular season					Playoffs
Season	Team	League	GP	G	A	Pts	PIM	GP	G	A	Pts	PIM
2001–02	Vernon Vipers	BCHL	60	26	29	55	31	—	—	—	—	—
2002–03	Vernon Vipers	BCHL	60	32	44	76	52	—	—	—	—	—
2003–04	University of Alaska Anchorage	WCHA	40	4	13	17	6	—	—	—	—	—
2004–05	University of Alaska Anchorage	WCHA	37	12	11	23	10	—	—	—	—	—
2005–06	University of Alaska Anchorage	WCHA	35	5	8	13	14	—	—	—	—	—
2006–07	University of Alaska Anchorage	WCHA	37	10	21	31	14	—	—	—	—	—
2006–07	Alaska Aces	ECHL	9	3	3	6	4	8	3	2	5	6
2007–08	Utah Grizzlies	ECHL	50	16	15	31	46	13	2	0	2	2
2007–08	Bridgeport Sound Tigers	AHL	16	2	3	5	2	—	—	—	—	—
2008–09	Reading Royals	ECHL	1	0	0	0	0	—	—	—	—	—
2008–09	Idaho Steelheads	ECHL	11	1	1	2	21	—	—	—	—	—
AHL totals			16	2	3	5	2	—	—	—	—	—

== Awards and honors ==
Honours	Year
ECHL
All-Star Game	2008
