= Sportsnet =

Canadian regional sports networks

- Sportsnet logo used since October 3, 2011

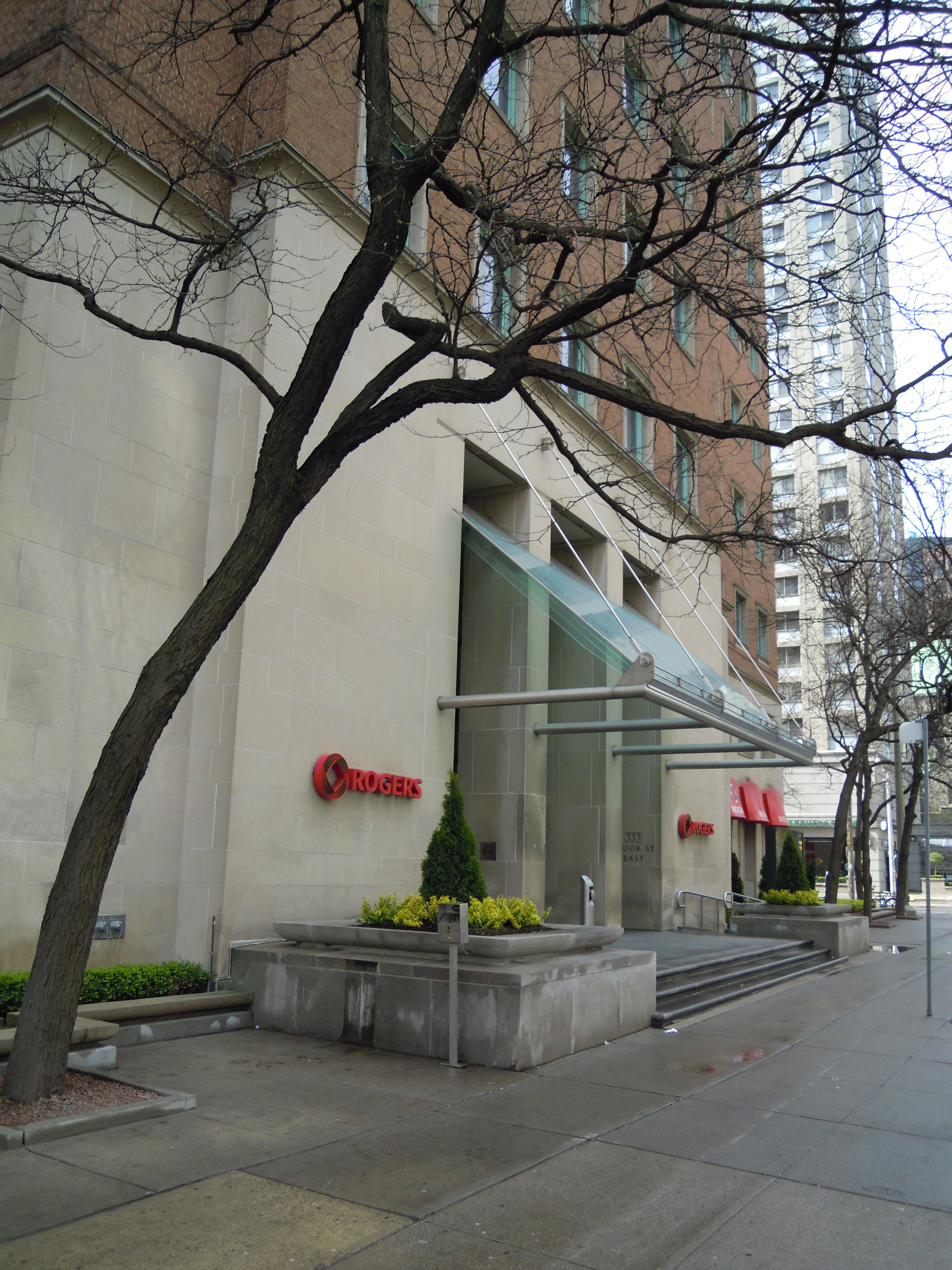
- The current Sportsnet studios is located on the Rogers Building in downtown Toronto since 2008
- Country: Canada
- Broadcast area: National
- Headquarters: Rogers Building, Toronto, Ontario

Programming
- Picture format: 1080i (HDTV); some events broadcast in 4K

Ownership
- Owner: Baton Broadcasting/CTV Inc. (1998–2000); Bell Globemedia (2000–2001); Liberty Media (1998–2004); Rogers Sports & Media (1998–present)
- Sister channels: TV: Sportsnet One; Sportsnet World; Sportsnet 360; Sportsnet Radio: CJCL

History
- Launched: October 9, 1998; 28 years ago
- Former names: CTV Sportsnet (1998–2001); Rogers Sportsnet (2001–2011)

Links
- Website: sportsnet.ca

Availability

Streaming media
- Sportsnet+: watch.sportsnet.ca (Canadian television subscribers only; requires login from pay television provider or OTT subscription to access content)

Sportsnet is a Toronto-based company, owned by Rogers Sports & Media. It was established in 1998 as CTV Sportsnet, a joint venture between Baton Broadcasting, Liberty Media, and Rogers Media. Bell Globemedia, the company that acquired CTV Inc. (formerly Baton) in 2000, was required to divest the channel following its 2001 acquisition of competing network TSN. Rogers then became the sole owner of Sportsnet in 2004 after it bought the remaining minority stake that was held by Fox.

The Sportsnet license comprises four 24-hour programming services; Sportsnet was originally licensed by the Canadian Radio-television and Telecommunications Commission (CRTC) as a category A service, operating as a group of regional sports networks offering programming tailored to each feed's region (in contrast to TSN, which was licensed at the time to operate as a national sports service, and could only offer limited regional opt-outs). Since 2011, the service has operated under deregulated category C licensing, which allows Sportsnet to operate multiple feeds with no restrictions on alternate programming. In each region, only the local Sportsnet channel is available on analogue cable, but all four channels are available nationally via digital cable (subject to blackouts for some out-of-market teams).

The four Sportsnet feeds air some common programming and simulcast major, national events, but are capable of airing programming autonomously—most prominently regional programming. Sportsnet is the national cable rightsholder of the National Hockey League, and also holds full regional rights to three (and partial regional rights to one) of the league's Canadian franchises. It is also the national rightsholder and provides extensive coverage of Major League Baseball in Canada (although most of ESPN's MLB broadcasts are sub-licensed to rival network TSN), and the exclusive broadcaster of the co-owned Toronto Blue Jays. It splits regional coverage of the NHL's Toronto Maple Leafs and national coverage of the NBA's Toronto Raptors with TSN; Rogers Communications and TSN's parent company Bell Canada previously owned a joint majority stake in the teams' parent company, which has since been acquired by Rogers.

The Sportsnet brand has since been extended beyond the original regional channels, now encompassing the national channels Sportsnet 360, Sportsnet One (and its regional part-time companion channels), and Sportsnet World; Sportsnet Radio station in Toronto, (Vancouver and Calgary staions closed July 2026); and Sportsnet Magazine. With these brand extensions, Rogers now generally uses "Sportsnet" (by itself) to denote its sports media properties as a whole, and on-air promotions for programs being carried nationally by these four regional feeds often list all four channels separately, or refer to the Sportsnet "regional" (or "main") channels, to avoid any ambiguity. However, standalone mentions of "Sportsnet" in reference to a specific channel can still generally be assumed to be referring to the four regional channels (or the specific regional channel available locally on analogue cable).

== History ==
Sportsnet was approved by the CRTC in September 1996 under the tentative name S3, with Baton Broadcasting Inc. (later renamed to CTV Inc.) holding a 40% controlling interest in the network, and 20% minority stakes held by Rogers Media and Liberty Media (in turn a spin-off of TCI, an American cable-television group). The network proposed a structure with an emphasis on regional programming, operating four feeds to serve different areas of the country.

The network launched on October 9, 1998, as CTV Sportsnet, under the ownership of CTV, Rogers, and Liberty; the latter which owned some of the Fox Sports Net operations that Fox ran in the United States after which the channel was named.

The new network gained credibility before it went on the air, having acquired national cable rights to the National Hockey League from long-time holder TSN. From 1998–99 until 2001–02, Sportsnet aired NHL games to a national audience throughout the regular season, and covered first-round playoff series not involving Canadian teams. Its first live sports event was an NHL opening night telecast between the Philadelphia Flyers and New York Rangers. The national cable rights to the NHL returned to TSN in 2002, though Sportsnet retained regional broadcast rights for most Canadian NHL teams.

=== Acquisition by Rogers ===
When CTV purchased NetStar, the former parent company of TSN, in 2000, the CRTC ordered CTV to sell either TSN or its stake in Sportsnet. CTV ultimately chose to retain TSN, and sell its stake in Sportsnet. The other shareholders had first right of refusal; as Rogers was the only interested party, it acquired CTV's stake in the summer of 2001, and soon after renamed it Rogers Sportsnet. During part of the transition period, during which time the channel was known as "Sportsnet", CTV was allowed to control programming on both networks, and some cross-affiliation and programs that were going to be tape-delayed on TSN, most notably figure skating, were given to Sportsnet. In 2004, Rogers then bought the remaining 20 percent stake from Fox.

While Sportsnet had been based there from the beginning, TSN's operations would move to CTV's suburban Toronto complex, 9 Channel Nine Court, following the acquisition. This led to some peculiarities related to the fact that the two rival sports channels were only separated by a "parking lot", leading to jokes and references from both networks. On April 30, 2008, Rogers Sportsnet moved its broadcast operations from 9 Channel Nine Court to the Rogers Building, a cluster of buildings in the Mount Pleasant-Jarvis Street area of Downtown Toronto.

=== Expansion ===
In 2010, Rogers began to extend the Sportsnet brand beyond the original regional networks with the August 14 launch of Rogers Sportsnet One – a national companion channel promising 800 hours of live events per year. The channel was also accompanied by additional part-time feeds to serve as overflow channels for its regional NHL coverage.

Sportsnet's original "Player" logo maintained the same basic form until 2011. The logos are of pre-launch, 1998–2001, 2001–2010, and 2010–2011

In January 2011, Rogers' sports radio stations, CJCL Toronto ("The Fan 590") and CFAC Calgary ("The Fan 960"), were rebranded as "Sportsnet Radio Fan 590" and "Sportsnet Radio Fan 960" respectively. Critics speculated that the Sportsnet Radio branding was intended to increase synergy with its television counterparts, upon rumors that TSN would be launching a sports radio network of its own.

In July 2011, Rogers announced that it would be rebranding its premium international sports channel Setanta Sports Canada as "Sportsnet World" on October 3, 2011 – a move that would allow the channel better opportunities for cross-promotion with other Sportsnet services. As part of the transition, Setanta Sports sold its minority ownership interest in the channel to MLM Management.

On September 29, 2011, Rogers published the first issue of Sportsnet Magazine, a bi-weekly sports magazine positioned "for Canadian sports fans", covering professional sports from a Canadian perspective. Sports writer Stephen Brunt left his position at The Globe and Mail newspaper to become the magazine's back page columnist.

==== "Fuelled By Fans" re-launch ====
On October 3, 2011, Rogers Sportsnet underwent a major rebranding, introducing a revamped logo and visual appearance designed in conjunction with Troika Design Group, and a new image campaign ("Fuelled By Fans"). Additionally, the network's official name was shortened to just Sportsnet. The new logo does not incorporate the previous "player" emblem that had been used in the network's branding since its original launch, as research performed by Rogers indicated that its association with Sportsnet did not resonate well with viewers. The redesign of Sportsnet was overseen by Dean Bender, who served as the network's creative director upon its original launch as CTV Sportsnet.

=== 2013–2018 ===
On August 25, 2012, Rogers announced that it would acquire the television assets of Score Media, owners of The Score Television Network (a competing sports network which primarily airs sports news and highlights, alongside event coverage), in a transaction valued at $167 million. The acquisition itself closed on October 19, 2012, at which point Score Media's digital assets (including its website and mobile apps) were spun off into another company, theScore Inc., in which Rogers Media would retain a 10% interest. Score Media's TV properties were immediately placed into a blind trust, under trustee Peter Viner, pending final CRTC approval. Rogers plans to continue running the network as a sports news service.

The acquisition and Rogers' proposed amendments (which included a reduction in the frequency of sports updates during live events) were approved by the CRTC on April 30, 2013; the same day, The Score also began to air more Sportsnet-produced programming, including a simulcast of CJCL's afternoon show Tim & Sid and Hockey Central Playoff Extra. However, the CRTC rejected the use of a proposed winter sports competition, the Sportsnet Winter Games, for its tangible benefits requirements.

On June 4, 2013, Rogers announced that The Score would be rebranded as a Sportsnet channel; the channel changed its name to Sportsnet 360 on July 1, 2013. As of 2014, Sportsnet is available in 8.2 million Canadian homes.

On October 2, 2018, Scott Moore, Rogers' head of Sportsnet and NHL properties, stepped down.

== Regional feeds ==
Similarly to regional sports networks in the United States, Sportsnet is operated in four regional feeds. While the feeds carry national programming as well, they primarily broadcast sporting events tailored to the region they serve. The four regional feeds are listed in the table below.

All four feeds are available in both standard and high-definition formats. Although cable providers in Canada are permitted to carry only the local Sportsnet feed on analogue cable packages, all four feeds can be carried on digital television services. However, in some instances, programming on the out-of-market Sportsnet feeds, particularly regional NHL games, are blacked out due to league restrictions on teams' regional broadcast rights. Since the revival of the Winnipeg Jets in 2011, regional Flames and Oilers games on Sportsnet West have also been blacked out in Manitoba, despite it being the "local" Sportsnet feed for that province.

Channel	Description and programming	Broadcast area
Sportsnet Pacific	Regional feed for British Columbia and Yukon; airs regional Vancouver Canucks games.	The four Rogers Sportsnet regions
Sportsnet West	Regional feed for the Prairies, the Northwest Territories, Nunavut, and the western portions of Northwestern Ontario; airs regional Calgary Flames and Edmonton Oilers games except in Manitoba and Northwestern Ontario.	The four Rogers Sportsnet regions
Sportsnet Ontario	Regional feed for most of Ontario; airs regional Toronto Maple Leafs games.	The four Rogers Sportsnet regions
Sportsnet East	Regional feed for Eastern Ontario, Quebec and Atlantic Canada.	The four Rogers Sportsnet regions

== Programming ==
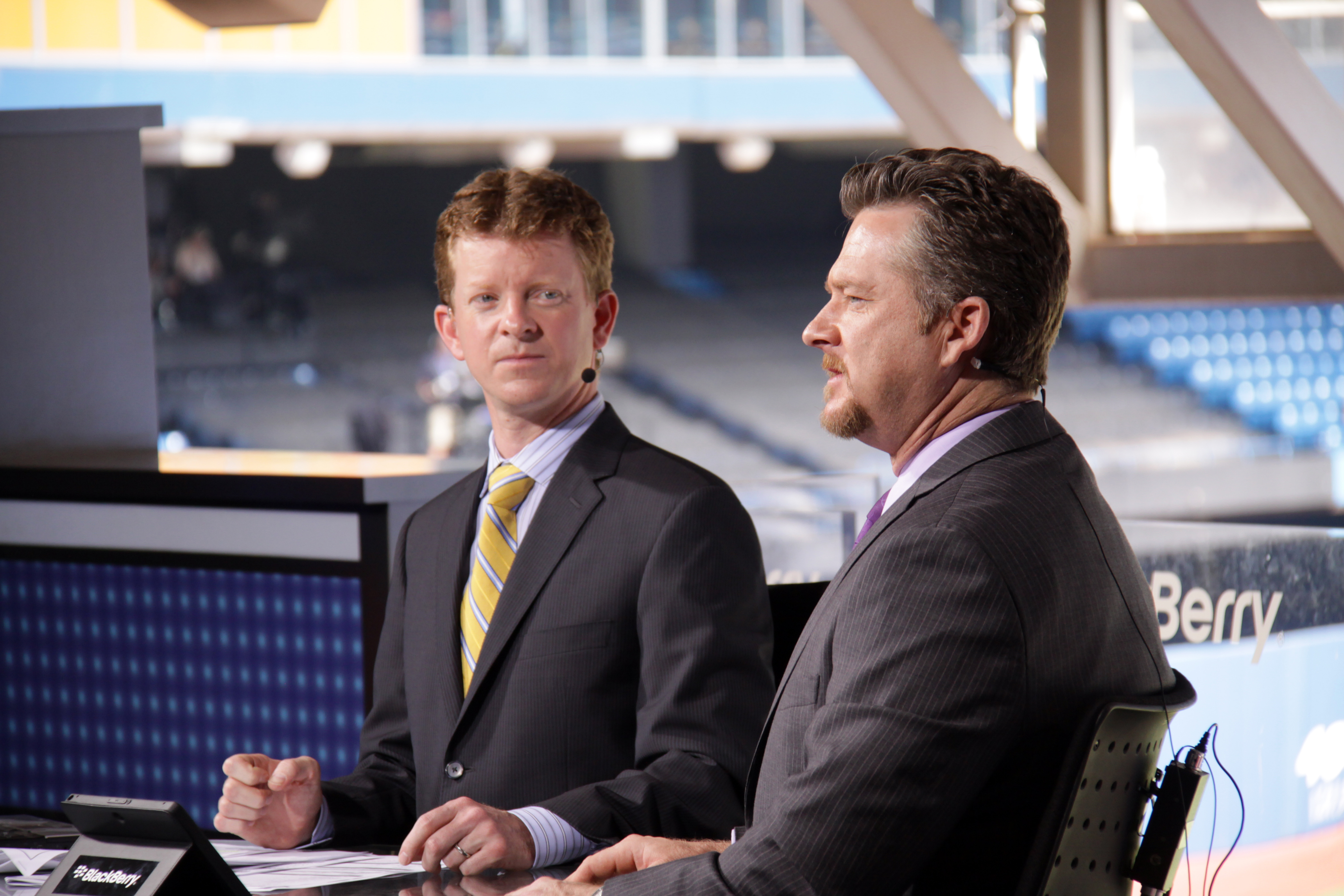
Jamie Campbell and Gregg Zaun providing Sportsnet coverage of a Toronto Blue Jays game in 2011

Sportsnet is the main television outlet for Major League Baseball in Canada: it is the exclusive television outlet for the Toronto Blue Jays (which are also owned by Rogers), airing all of its games (except for Friday Night Baseball games which are exclusive to Apple TV+) and other Blue Jays-related programming throughout the season. It also holds Canadian rights to Fox Saturday Baseball, the All-Star Game and the postseason (non-Blue Jays games through Fox, TBS and MLB International, with Blue Jays games produced in-house so long as they remain in the playoffs). Sportsnet also carries other MLB games simulcast from U.S. regional sports networks.

Sportsnet began airing National Football League games Starting with the 2005 season, splitting late games across the Pacific and West feeds, and the East and Ontario feeds. The games not shown in the opposite regions were carried out regionally by City. It also had rights to Thursday Night Football and the American Thanksgiving games. Sportsnet lost all NFL broadcasting rights for the 2017 season.

Sportsnet carried a large amount of soccer programming; it has been the Canadian broadcaster of the Premier League since 1998 until 2018/19 season (from 2013/14 to 2018/19 season, Sportsnet jointly held Canadian rights to the Premier League with TSN), and also held rights to the FA Cup, UEFA Champions League and Europa League. Sportsnet lost UEFA coverage to TSN for 2015, but gained rights to Bundesliga matches beginning in the 2015–16 season until 2022–23 season. Sportsnet aired the Amway Canadian Championship, an annual competition featuring Canada's five professional soccer teams – Toronto FC, CF Montréal, Vancouver Whitecaps FC, FC Edmonton, and Ottawa Fury FC, until TSN acquired full rights in 2017.

In 2006, Sportsnet aired coverage of the FIFA World Cup as part of a consortium with TSN and CTV. From 2011 through 2014, beginning with the 2011 FIFA Women's World Cup, CBC sub-licensed cable rights to FIFA tournaments to Sportsnet, including the 2014 FIFA World Cup.

On February 8, 2011, Sportsnet announced that it had signed a multi-year deal with Tennis Canada to acquire early round rights to the Rogers Cup. Sportsnet also acquired rights to the ATP World Tour Masters 1000 and ATP World Tour 500 series events. As per an extension of Rogers' sponsorship rights to the tournament, Sportsnet holds sole rights to the Rogers Cup beginning in 2016. In 2016, Sportsnet lost the ATP tours to TSN, but it still maintains exclusive rights to the Rogers Cup.

In February 2013, Sportsnet announced that it would become the official Canadian broadcaster of the IndyCar Series beginning in the 2013 season in a five-year deal with the series. The new contract includes broadcasts on Sportsnet's networks and City, and French rights sub-licensed to TVA Sports. That season, Sportsnet also originated coverage from the Honda Grand Prix of St. Petersburg, Indianapolis 500 and Honda Indy Toronto, with Bill Adam, Todd Lewis and Rob Faulds. Canadian driver Paul Tracy joined Sportsnet as an analyst. As of the 2019 season, all but the Honda Indy Toronto and Indianapolis 500 moved exclusively to Sportsnet World and Sportsnet Now+.

In May 2013, Sportsnet reached a six-year deal for rights to the national championships of U Sports (then known as Canadian Interuniversity Sport), including coverage of the Vanier Cup.

=== Hockey coverage ===
Sportsnet is a major broadcaster of National Hockey League games; the network is the current national cable rightsholder to the league, and regularly airs nationally televised games on Wednesday and Saturday nights as part of Hockey Night in Canada. Sportsnet is also a major regional broadcaster of the NHL; its four regional feeds carry regional telecasts of five of the seven Canadian franchises, including the Toronto Maple Leafs on Sportsnet Ontario (split with TSN4 beginning in 2014–15; Rogers and Bell Canada own a joint, majority stake in the team's parent company Maple Leaf Sports & Entertainment), the Calgary Flames and Edmonton Oilers on Sportsnet West, and the Vancouver Canucks on Sportsnet Pacific.

In January 2014, Sportsnet lost the Ottawa Senators to TSN, who acquired regional rights to the team in English and French under a 12-year deal, beginning in the 2014–15 season. In September 2014, Sportsnet announced its acquisition of regional English-language television rights to the Montreal Canadiens under a 3-year deal, replacing the Senators on Sportsnet East and succeeding TSN as regional rightsholder, until 2016–17.

Sportsnet held the rights to the Canadian Hockey League under a 12-year deal renewed in the 2014–15 season. Its coverage included a package of national broadcasts from the CHL's member leagues, coverage of the CHL Canada/Russia Series and the CHL/NHL Top Prospects Game, along with coverage of the season-ending Memorial Cup tournament. In the 2021–22 season, Sportsnet lost the rights to CBC Sports and TSN, with the latter covering the Memorial Cup.

==== National NHL contracts ====
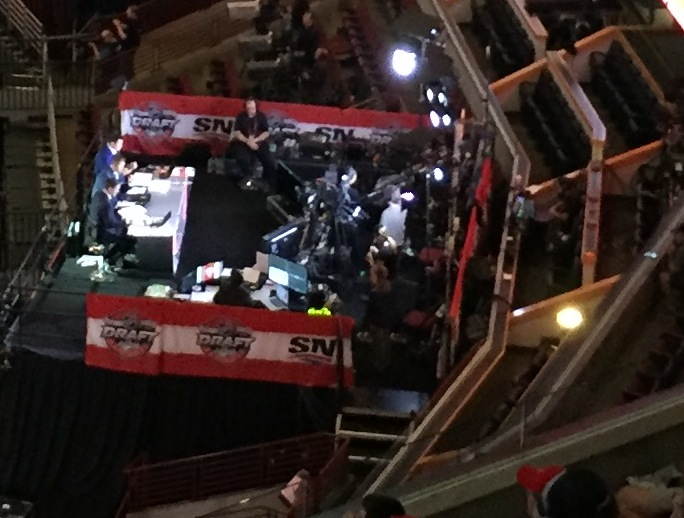
Sportsnet covering the 2017 NHL entry draft

From its launch through 2002, Sportsnet was the national cable broadcaster of the NHL in Canada, displacing the rival TSN; it aired a package of Tuesday night games, along with coverage of non-Canadian matchups from the first round of the Stanley Cup Playoffs.

On November 26, 2013, Rogers Communications announced that it had reached a 12-year deal to become the exclusive national rightsholder for the National Hockey League, again displacing TSN, along with CBC, a deal which began in the 2014–15 season. Valued at $5.2 billion and covering both television and digital media rights to the league, the value of the contract surpassed the league's most recent U.S. rights deal with NBC. Alongside its existing regional rights, Sportsnet now airs Scotiabank Wednesday Night Hockey, along with games during Hockey Night in Canada. On April 2, 2025, Rogers Communications announced it had reached a new 12-year deal valued at $11 billion extending their contract through the 2037-2038 season.

=== Olympics coverage ===
In early 2005, Rogers Media and CTVglobemedia jointly acquired broadcast rights to the Vancouver 2010 Winter Olympics, as well as the London 2012 Summer Olympics. This was considered a serious coup, as the Canadian Broadcasting Corporation (CBC) had consistently won Olympic broadcast rights from the 1996 Summer Olympics through to the 2008 Summer Olympics. CTV and V were the primary broadcasters; Sportsnet, TSN and RDS provided supplementary coverage. Rogers announced in 2011 that it would not bid with CTVglobemedia's predecessor Bell Media for the rights to the 2014 and 2016 games, citing scheduling and financial issues.

While Bell Media did attempt to partner with the CBC in 2011 to bid for coverage, CBC reached a deal of its own in August 2012, winning the rights to the 2014 and 2016 Games. On February 7, 2013, CBC announced that it had reached deals with Sportsnet and TSN for both networks to become their official cable partners, beginning at the 2014 Winter Olympics. CBC will continue this sub-licensing agreement through the 2032 Summer Olympics.

Sportsnet televised coverage of the 2015 Pan-American Games, also as part of a sub-license with CBC; it aired coverage of the soccer tournaments, as well as a Men's basketball semi-final game involving Canada.

== Summary of sports rights ==
=== Baseball ===
- Major League Baseball: All Toronto Blue Jays games (except those airing on Apple TV+), All-Star Game (through MLB International), post-seasons (through Fox, TBS if not involving the Blue Jays), World Series (through MLB International if not involving the Blue Jays), other MLB games simulcast from U.S. broadcasters

=== Hockey ===
- National Hockey League:
  - National rights through 2038, including weekly national games, all playoff games, and other NHL games simulcast from U.S. broadcasters.
  - Holds regional rights to the Calgary Flames, Edmonton Oilers, Toronto Maple Leafs (split with TSN), and Vancouver Canucks

=== Basketball ===
- National Basketball Association: splits regional coverage of Toronto Raptors and NBA playoffs with TSN; selected NBA games
- Women's National Basketball Association: split with TSN, NBA TV and Prime Video
- FIBA (through 2025)

=== Football ===
- England: FA Cup, FA Community Shield, FA WSL, Women's FA Cup (from 2020-21 season)
- Netherlands: Eredivisie

=== Golf ===
- TGL (golf league)

=== Mixed Martial Arts ===
- Ultimate Fighting Championship

=== Tennis ===
- Canadian Open

=== Curling ===
- Grand Slam of Curling (2012–present) (selected events sub-licensed to CBC Sports)

=== Olympics ===
- Summer and Winter Olympics, sublicensed from CBC

=== Original programs ===
- Sportsnet Central – The daily sports news/highlights program of Sportsnet. Hosted by various personalities. Formerly known as Sportscentral, Sportsnetnews, and Sportsnet Connected.
- Hockey Central – News and reports from the NHL. Hosted by Caroline Cameron, and features hockey analysts Nick Kypreos, Bill Watters and Gord Stellick.
- Hockey Central at Noon – Simulcast from CJCL; News and reports from the NHL. Hosted by Marek and features either Nick Kypreos or Bill Berg as co-host.

== Notable on-air staff ==
- David Amber (also with CBC Sports)
- Colby Armstrong (also with TNT and SportsNet Pittsburgh)
- Alex Auld
- John Bartlett
- Kevin Bieksa
- Justin Bourne
- Caroline Cameron
- Jamie Campbell
- Sam Cosentino
- Chris Cuthbert
- Louie DeBrusk
- Matt Devlin
- Brad Fay
- Ray Ferraro (also with ESPN/ABC)
- Elliotte Friedman (also with CBC Sports)
- Martine Gaillard
- Garry Galley
- Luke Gazdic
- Caleb Joseph
- Nick Kypreos
- Ron MacLean (also with CBC Sports)
- Hazel Mae
- Jack Michaels
- Dan Murphy
- Kevin Pillar
- Gene Principe
- Frank Seravalli
- John Shorthouse
- Dan Shulman (also with ESPN)
- Joe Siddall
- Craig Simpson
- Harnarayan Singh
- Devante Smith-Pelly
- Gord Stellick
- Dave Tomlinson
- Alvin Williams
- Justin Williams

=== Notable alumni ===
This list includes the all time Sportsnet 360 staff dated to its days as The Score.

- Rick Ball (at Chicago Sports Network)
- Tyson Barrie
- Bill Berg
- Jennifer Botterill (at TNT)
- Rick Bowness
- Greg Brady
- Dean Brown (at TSN Radio 1200)
- Brian Burke (at PWHL)
- Hugh Burrill
- Cassie Campbell-Pascall (at PWHL and ESPN/ABC)
- Anthony Carelli (at TNA Wrestling)
- Anson Carter (at TNT)
- Vince Carter (at NBC Sports and NBA TV)
- Don Cherry
- Bob Cole (deceased)
- Damien Cox
- James Cybulski
- Steve Dangle
- Gerry Dee
- Darren Dreger (at TSN)
- Brendan Dunlop (at TSN)
- Rob Faulds
- Landon Ferraro (at TSN)
- Craig Forrest (at CBC Television and OneSoccer)
- John Garrett (deceased)
- Glenn Healy
- Leah Hextall (at ESPN)
- Corey Hirsch
- Kelly Hrudey
- Jim Hughson
- Mike Johnson (at TSN)
- Jimmy Korderas
- Steve Kouleas (at SiriusXM)
- Doug MacLean
- Jeff Marek
- Buck Martinez
- Deb Matejicka
- Jamal Mayers
- Bob McCown
- Daren Millard
- Greg Millen (deceased)
- Gabriel Morency (at The Fight Network)
- Scott Oake
- Arda Ocal (at ESPN)
- Sara Orlesky
- Darren Pang (at Chicago Sports Network\TNT)
- Renee Paquette (at All Elite Wrestling)
- Chris Pronger (at Amazon Prime Video)
- Kevin Quinn
- Mauro Ranallo
- Dave Randorf (at Scripps Sports)
- Jackie Redmond (at NHL Network, WWE, TNT)
- Drew Remenda (at NBC Sports California)
- Cabbie Richards
- Paul Romanuk
- Greg Sansone
- Sid Seixeiro
- John Shannon
- Christine Simpson
- Tara Slone (at NBC Sports California, SiriusXM)
- Anthony Stewart
- P.J. Stock (at RDS)
- George Stroumboulopoulos (at Apple Music)
- Pat Tabler
- Don Taylor (at CHEK-DT)
- Adnan Virk (at ESPN)
- Bill Watters
- Jason York
- Gregg Zaun

== Other services ==
=== Sportsnet+ ===
In 2014, Sportsnet announced the launch of a new TV Everywhere service known as Sportsnet Now, allowing online streaming of the Sportsnet regional channels, Sportsnet One, and Sportsnet 360 for cable subscribers. On March 31, 2016, Rogers announced that Sportsnet Now would be made available as an over-the-top streaming service for cord cutters, initially priced at $24.99 per-month, in addition to remaining available at no additional charge to cable subscribers.

In October 2018, the price was dropped to $19.99, annual subscription options were added, and an additional tier known as Sportsnet Now+ was introduced, adding additional international soccer and rugby events, and out-of-market streaming of regional NHL games for Canadian teams whose rights are owned by Sportsnet. NHL Live, the NHL's digital out-of-market sports package, was later added to Sportsnet Now+ in January 2021.

In April 2022, the plan structures were changed; a $24.99 tier was reintroduced which adds WWE Network, while Now+ was replaced with Sportsnet Now Premium, which is priced at $34.99 per-month and includes WWE Network and out-of-market NHL games beginning the 2022–23 season (replacing NHL Live). The service was quietly renamed Sportsnet+ ahead of the 2023–24 NHL season.

=== High-definition television ===
Sportsnet operates four high-definition feeds, one for each regional channel. Originally, Sportsnet operated one national feed that consisted primarily of a simulcast of Sportsnet Ontario, carrying nationally televised events, or separate content from other regional feeds. That feed was launched on September 1, 2003.

In 2007, Sportsnet began using a second high-definition feed in order to broadcast selected regional NHL games in HD, beginning in the 2007–08 NHL season, activated only in the regions where a game is set to be televised. On January 26, 2009, the national HD feed was replaced by individual HD feeds for each region.

=== 4K ===
On October 5, 2015, Rogers announced that it planned to produce 101 sports telecasts in 4K ultra-high-definition format in 2016, including all Toronto Blue Jays home games, and "marquee" NHL games beginning in January 2016. These broadcasts are offered via a part-time Sportsnet 4K channel on participating television providers.

On January 14, 2016, in cooperation with BT Sport, Sportsnet broadcast the first ever NBA game produced in 4K, and the first live sporting event in 4K in Canadian history—a Toronto Raptors/Orlando Magic game at O2 Arena in London. Sportsnet's first domestic 4K telecast, a Toronto Maple Leafs/Montreal Canadiens game, aired January 23, 2016.

== See also ==
- List of NHL on Sportsnet commentators

== Sources ==
- "TSN2 adds Sunday Night Baseball to its lineup". TSN.ca. Archived from the original on June 29, 2011.
