= Damien Cox =

Canadian journalist

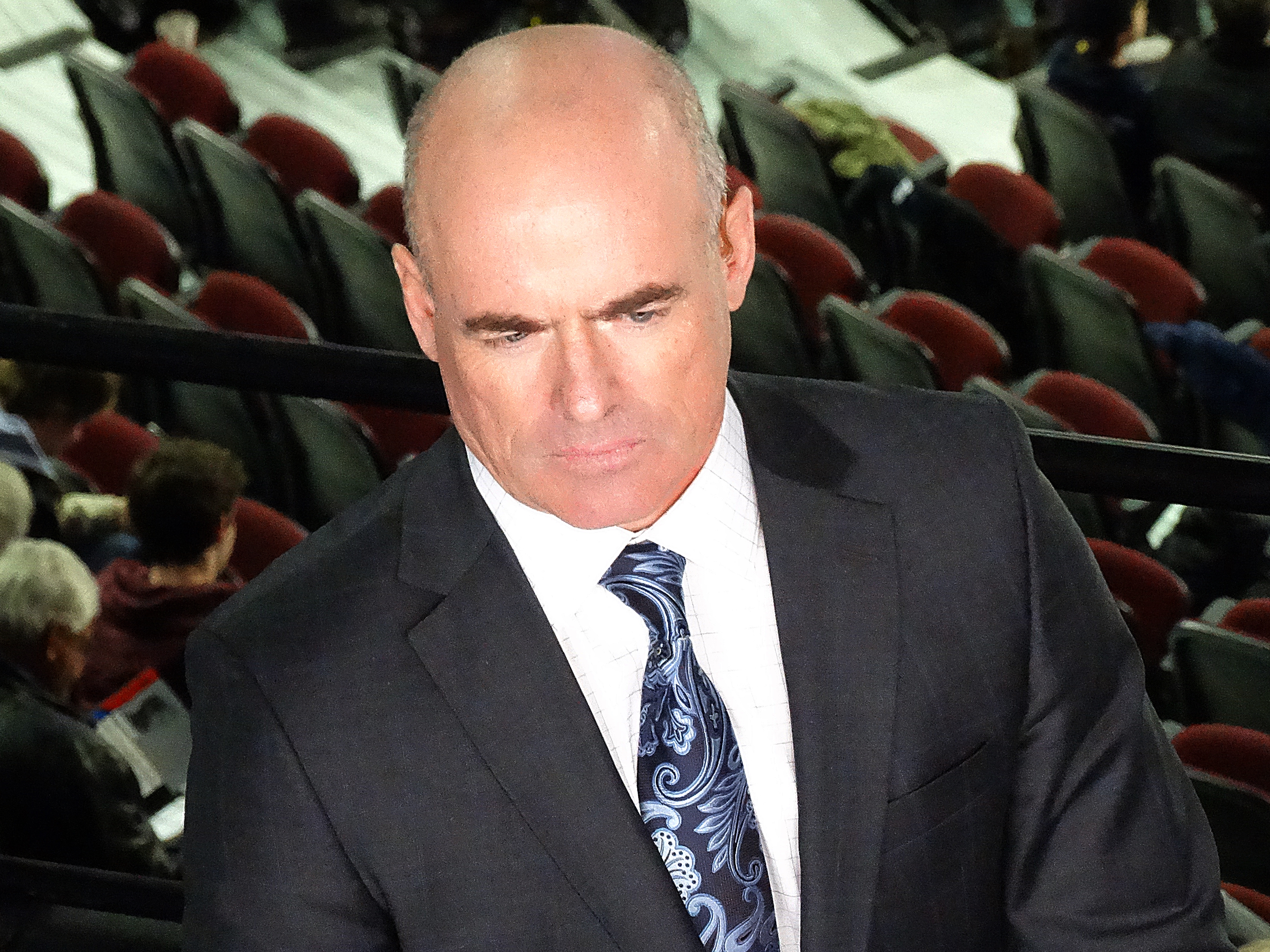
Damien Cox, 2014

Damien Cox (born August 23, 1961, in Hamilton, Ontario) is a Canadian journalist, broadcaster and author based in Toronto. Currently, he writes two columns a week for The Toronto Star, who he has written for since 1985, and was the co-host of Prime Time Sports with Bob McCown on Sportsnet The Fan 590. Cox also writes for Sportsnet.ca on hockey. He has covered the NHL and the Toronto Maple Leafs as a reporter and columnist for over 28 years, as well as the 1998, 2002, 2006 and 2010 Winter Olympics, and many other international hockey events.

Cox has worked extensively in radio and television in the past two decades, and was a full-time columnist at The Star until June, 2014. For three years, from 2001 to 2004, he was co-host of Prime Time Sports, heard daily on The Fan 590 in Toronto, and on the Rogers radio network across Canada. He left the show in 2004 when it became simulcast on Rogers Sportsnet, a conflict with his work at TSN. He has covered the CFL and the Grey Cup since 1999, and Wimbledon tennis since 2004.

Cox was a regular on TSN's The Reporters and That's Hockey until he left TSN in January 2011 to rejoin Rogers and Sportsnet Radio Fan 590 as a co-host on Prime Time Sports and to become an analyst on Rogers Sportsnet. He was a regular contributor to Hockey Night in Canada from 2014 to 2016. He rejoined Prime Time Sports in June, 2016. An avid tennis player, he was an analyst for Sportsnet's coverage of the 2011 Rogers Cup. In 2004, Cox co-wrote (with Gord Stellick) 67: The Maple Leafs, Their Sensational Victory, and the End of an Empire (ISBN 0-470-83400-5, John Wiley and Sons).

Cox wrote his second book in 2005, as he helped New Jersey Devils goaltender Martin Brodeur co-author his autobiography, Brodeur: Beyond The Crease (ISBN 0-470-83851-5, John Wiley and Sons). He wrote a third book, released in late 2010, with author Gare Joyce on the life and times of Washington Capitals star Alex Ovechkin, The Ovechkin Project (ISBN 978-0-470-67914-2, John Wiley and Sons).
