= John Shannon (sportscaster) =

Canadian sportscaster

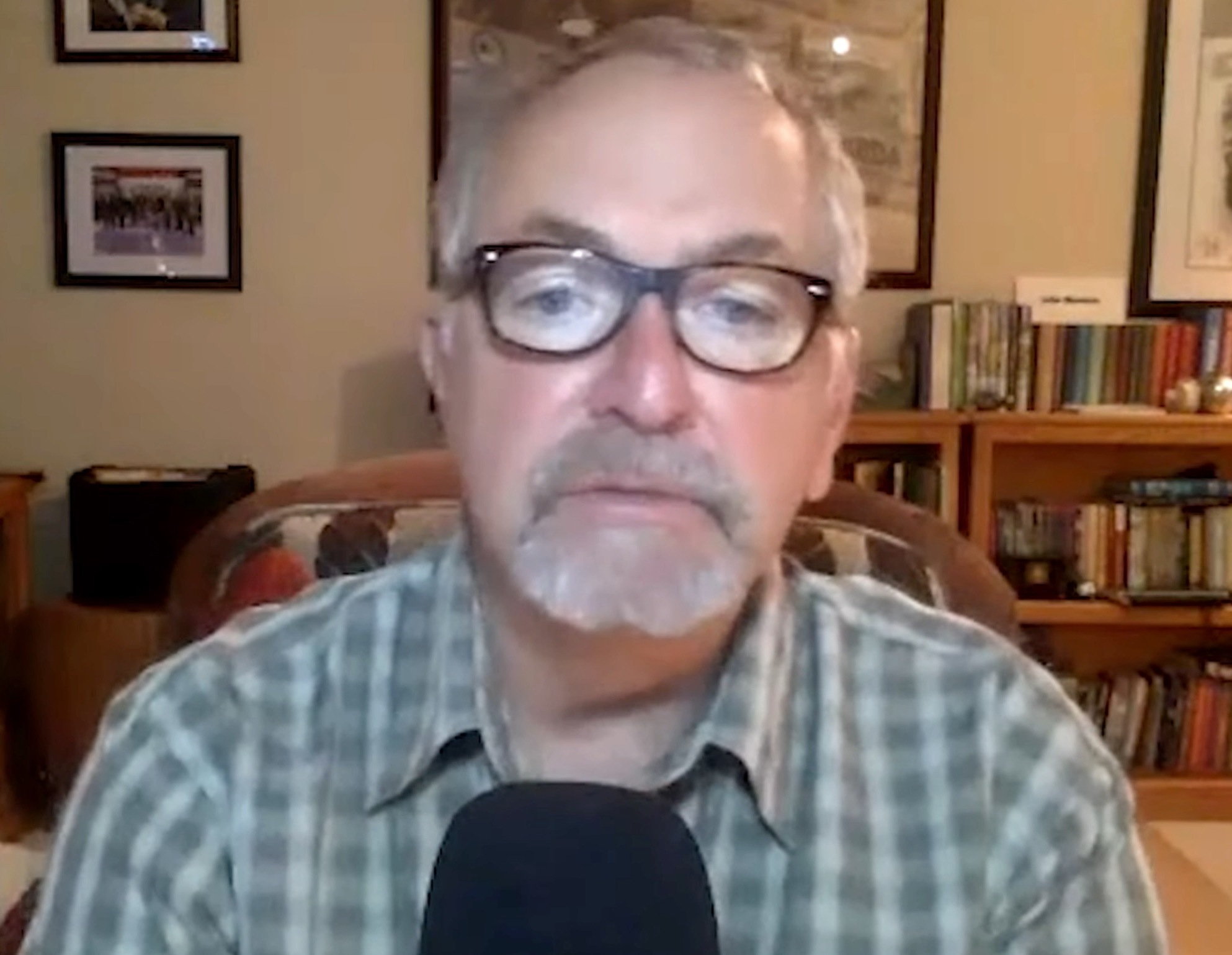
- Shannon in 2021
- Born: June 21, 1956 (age 70); Oliver, British Columbia
- Occupations: Sportscaster, television producer
- Employer: Rogers Sportsnet
- Known for: Hockey Central

John Shannon (born June 21, 1956) is a Canadian sportscaster, television producer, and former panelist on Rogers Sportsnet's Hockey Central. In 2003, he won a Sports Emmy Award for Outstanding Live Sports Special for his work on NBC's broadcast of the XIX Olympic Winter Games in Salt Lake City.

On October 7, 2008 Shannon was named Executive In Charge of Programming and Production for NHL Network in addition to being Executive Vice President of Programming and Production for the National Hockey League.

On September 28, 2009, Shannon left the NHL Network to become an on-air panelist for Rogers Sportsnet as a member of their Hockey Central studio panel. On November 1, 2009, Shannon also became a co-host of sports talk radio show Prime Time Sports on Fan 590 in Toronto alongside host Bob McCown which was also simulcast on Rogers Sportsnet. On June 19, 2019, Prime Time Sports aired for the final time before its cancellation, and on August 28, 2019, it was reported that Shannon would be retained by Rogers Sportsnet for the upcoming NHL season.

On July 10, 2020, McCown began a series of sports talk podcasts on his YouTube channel that would later be branded as "The Bob McCown Show" featuring himself & Shannon as his co-host, and a guest or two from the sports industry to discuss sports topics of the day, similar to his former show Prime Time Sports. As of March 2021, his podcasts were also broadcast on radio station Sauga 960 AM in Mississauga, Ontario weekdays from 6PM - 7PM.
