= David Amber =

Canadian anchor (born 1971)

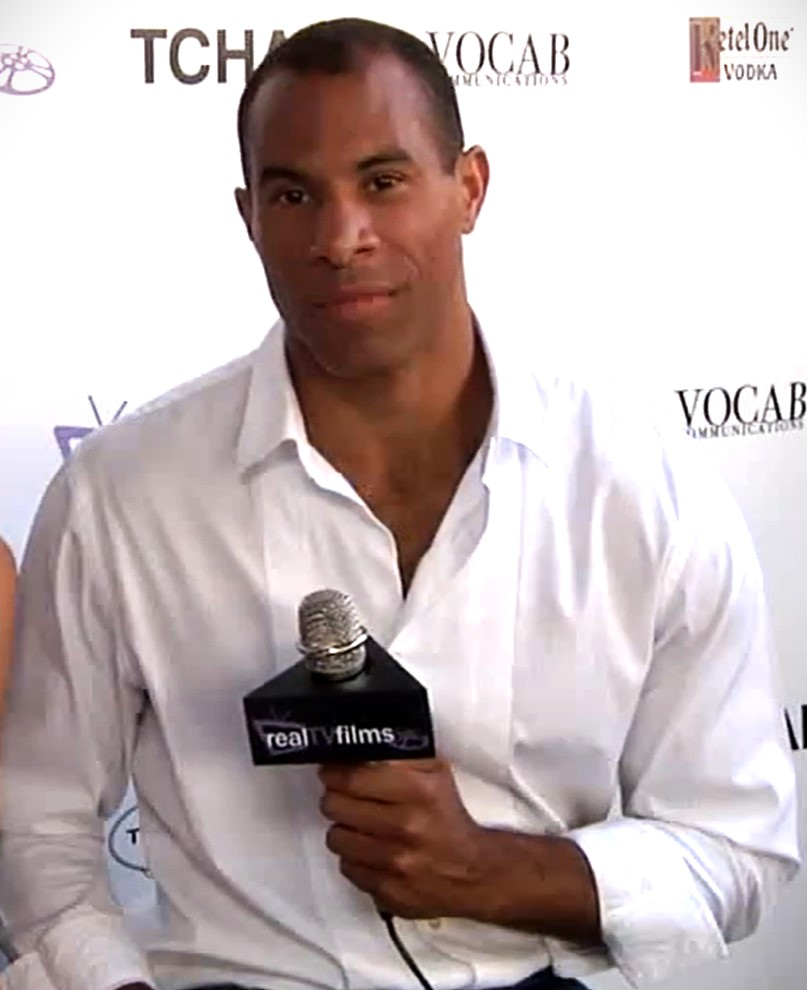
- Amber at the 2011 Toronto International Film Festival
- Born: April 21, 1971 (age 55); Toronto, Ontario, Canada
- Occupation: Sportscaster
- Employer: Rogers Media

David Amber (born April 21, 1971) is a Canadian anchor for Sportsnet as a host and reporter. He is best known for his time doing NHL On the Fly on the NHL Network and as the anchor for Gate 5 Live, Raptors Pregame, and Raptors Post Up on NBA TV Canada. He had been an anchor and reporter for ESPN and its family of networks.

== Biography ==
Amber, who had appeared on ESPN networks since 2002, was based in Toronto, contributing to SportsCenter, Outside the Lines, Baseball Tonight and College GameDay. A reporter since 2006, Amber had provided coverage from the NBA Finals, MLB postseason and other major events, as well as serving as a sideline reporter for NCAA football and the World Baseball Classic.

Amber joined ESPN as an ESPNEWS anchor in 2002, also anchoring Outside the Lines, NHL2Night and NCAA basketball.

Prior to ESPN, Amber served as a reporter and anchor for TSN in Toronto (1997–2002). At TSN, Amber reported from two Olympic Games, and several World Series, Stanley Cup Finals, and NBA Finals. From 1999 to 2001 he was a courtside reporter for TSN's broadcasts of Toronto Raptors games.

Amber joined NHL Network before the 2010–11 NHL season as host of NHL Tonight. Amber also serves as co-host for the Network's coverage at the NHL's signature events and exclusive programming. He joined the Hockey Night in Canada team at the start of the 2011–12 NHL season. After Rogers Media secured a 12-year, $5.2 billion deal for the exclusive national NHL rights at the start of the 2014–15 season, Amber has joined Sportsnet to serve as a reporter for their NHL coverage.

From 2016 to 2022, he became the studio host of the late game of Hockey Night in Canada, after the departure of George Stroumboulopoulos. In 2022, with Caroline Cameron covering the 2022 Winter Olympics, Amber filled-in on Scotiabank Wednesday Night Hockey.

From 2022 to 2024, Amber was the lead studio host for Rogers Monday Night Hockey.

In the 2024-25 NHL season, Amber filled in for Cameron, while Cameron was on maternity leave, again, on Scotiabank Wednesday Night Hockey. He remained host for the 2025-26 season after Cameron returned due to Monday Night Hockey being sublicenced to Prime Video under a two-year deal.

In the 2026-27 NHL Season, Amber was reinstated as host for Monday Night Hockey exclusively on Sportsnet+ while Wednesday Night Hockey was moved to Prime Video.

Amber received his Bachelor of Arts degree in North American Studies from McGill University in Montreal in 1993, and a Master of Arts degree in Broadcast Journalism from Syracuse University in 1995.

== Personal life ==
Amber's older sister is Jeannine Amber a graduate of Columbia University Graduate School of Journalism and an award-winning Senior Writer at Essence magazine, based in New York City. Amber's sister is also the author of the award-winning book Rabbit: The Autobiography of Ms. Pat. Amber and his wife have two children.
