= Sam Cosentino =

Canadian sportscaster

Salvatore "Sam" Cosentino (born March 16, 1971) is a Canadian sportscaster who currently works as a junior hockey and Saturday Night Hockey analyst on Sportsnet.

== Baseball ==
Cosentino attended Spring Arbor College in Spring Arbor, Michigan, where he played baseball and called basketball games. After graduation, Cosentino briefly worked as baseball instructor before joining the Toronto Blue Jays as a clubhouse employee. While working for the Blue Jays, Cosentino also hosted the Jr. Jays radio show.

Cosentino left the Blue Jays in 2003 to call Canadian Baseball League games on The Score. In 2004, he was the network's play-by-play announcer for Montreal Expos games.

In 2005, Cosentino joined Rogers Sportsnet's Toronto Blue Jays broadcast team as a field reporter. He remained in that position until he was replaced by multiple reporters following the 2010 season. During the 2012 season, he became host of Baseball Central alongside Dirk Hayhurst on Sportsnet 590 The Fan. He was succeeded by the team of Jeff Blair and Kevin Barker.

== Hockey ==
Cosentino began broadcasting hockey in 1998 as a color commentator on Rogers TV's Ontario Hockey League broadcasts. In 2003, he joined Rogers Sportsnet as a junior hockey and American Hockey League analyst.
