= Kevin Quinn (sportscaster) =

Canadian sportscaster (born 1958)

- Born: January 23, 1958 (age 68); Winnipeg, Manitoba
- Education: University of Western Ontario
- Occupation: sportscaster

Kevin Quinn (born January 23, 1958) is a Canadian sportscaster who was formerly the television play-by-play voice of the Edmonton Oilers on Sportsnet.

Quinn attended the University of Western Ontario and obtained a degree in psychology. He started his career as an anchor for CKVR Television in Barrie, Ontario, also doing play-by-play for an Ontario Hockey League game every week. Quinn was hired by CTV Sportsnet in 1998, and was a co-anchor for SportsCentral. Following Jim Robson's retirement in 1999, Quinn became the backup play-by-play voice of Vancouver Canucks and Calgary Flames games. He was then the primary play-by-play voice of the Oilers from 2001 to 2020. He also did play-by-play at the 2010 Winter Olympics for women's hockey.
