= Caroline Cameron =

Canadian television sportscaster

- Born: March 23, 1990 (age 36); Toronto, Ontario, Canada
- Education: University of Western Ontario (BA), Fanshawe College (Diploma)
- Years active: 2012–present
- Employer: Sportsnet

Caroline Cameron (born March 23, 1990) is a Canadian television sportscaster for Sportsnet. Cameron was the host of "Scotiabank Wednesday Night Hockey" as well as the pre-game program Hockey Central, four nights a week, regional intermissions, and is a rink-side reporter for NHL on Sportsnet, as well as a co-host for the network’s coverage of the NHL entry draft.

== Early life and education ==
Cameron was born in Toronto, Ontario in 1990. She earned a Bachelor of Arts degree from the University of Western Ontario and a Diploma in Broadcast Journalism from Fanshawe College by participating in their joint Media Theory and Production program.

== Career ==
Cameron was a sportscaster and reporter for Sportsnet in Toronto, Ontario, from 2012 to February 2014, appearing regularly on CityNews Channel doing updates. From February 2014 to March 2016, she lived in Vancouver, British Columbia and co-anchored the national morning edition of Sportsnet Central (formerly named Sportsnet Connected) with James Cybulski. After the studio was closed in Vancouver, Cameron returned to Toronto to co-anchor the national morning edition of Sportsnet Central with Carly Agro in 2016 and 2017 and with Eric Thomas in 2017 and 2018. Cameron also covered the Memorial Cup and the Vanier Cup for Sportsnet.

Prior to 2016, Cameron provided courtside commentary for Sportsnet's coverage of the Women's Rogers Cup Canadian Open tennis tournaments in Toronto and Montreal. From 2016 to 2021, Cameron has hosted and anchored the Sportsnet daytime coverage of the Rogers Cup (2016–2019) and the 2021 National Bank Open presented by Rogers Canadian Open tennis tournaments. In February 2018, Cameron hosted and called play-by-play for Sportsnet's coverage of Canada v. Croatia in Davis Cup competition, and did the play by play for the National Bank Open presented by Rogers since 2022.

In February 2018, Cameron hosted Sportsnet's "Olympic Morning" in Toronto for morning coverage of the XXIII Winter Olympics in Pyeongchang, South Korea. In 2021, Cameron hosted Sportsnet's "Olympic Morning" in Toronto for morning coverage of the 2020 Summer Olympics in Tokyo, Japan. In October 2021, Cameron replaced Jeff Marek as the studio host for Scotiabank Wednesday Night Hockey.

In February 2022, Cameron hosted Sportsnet's "Olympic Morning" in Toronto for morning coverage of the 2022 Winter Olympics in Beijing, China.

Cameron is a KidSport BC ambassador. KidSport is a not-for-profit organization that provides financial assistance for sports registration fees for kids 18 and under. Cameron also supports Dementia Friends Canada, an initiative of the Alzheimer Society of Canada to increase understanding of dementia to support the many Canadians who already have the disease.
