= Jeff Marek =

Canadian television and radio host

- Born: Keegan Sean Laughlin; July 9, 1969 (age 57); Stouffville, Ontario, Canada
- Occupation: sportscaster
- Known for: Hockey Night in Canada

Jeffrey James Marek (born Keegan Sean Laughlin, July 9, 1969) is a television personality and radio host for properties originating from Stouffville, Ontario, Canada. Jeff has hosted Live Audio Wrestling, Leafs Lunch (cohosted with former Toronto Maple Leaf executive Bill Watters) and The Jeff Marek Show, as well as making notable television appearances on TSN Off The Record and Leafs TV After the Horn. On October 1, 2007, he started as the host of Hockey Night in Canada Radio, signing a one-year contract with Sirius Satellite Radio in mid-August 2007. From 2011-2024, Marek worked with Sportsnet, before being dismissed due to leaking NHL draft selections to a friend while part of the broadcasting panel. He was the host of Hockey Central and also hosts The CHL on Sportsnet. Between 2014 and 2016 he occasionally hosted Hockey Night in Canada games that were played in the morning. As of 2026, Marek currently hosts hockey related podcast shows with two different networks.

== Career ==
Jeff started out by hosting Live Audio Wrestling, the first wrestling/MMA program available on conventional radio. During the early days of the radio show he got the nickname "Gentleman" Jeff Marek. In 2003, after The LAW had moved from The Fan 590 to Talk 640, Jeff began to host the pre-game and post-game shows for Toronto Maple Leafs telecasts, leading to Jeff leaving The LAW, to work full-time on his other on-air and behind the scenes roles at the recently rebranded Mojo Radio - Talk Radio For Guys. Eventually, Jeff would begin to host a daily talk show on the Toronto Maple Leafs in the afternoon, known as Leafs Lunch. He also hosted his own radio show which aired after Leafs Lunch, called The Jeff Marek Show, until Mojo Radio rebranded its station AM 640 - Toronto Radio. In the summer of 2007, Marek became the sole-host of Leafs Lunch, as well as co-host of The Bill Watters Show, the afternoon-drive program on the station hosted by his former Leafs Lunch partner, former Maple Leafs Assistant GM Bill Watters.

On September 7, 2007, Jeff Marek announced that he had accepted a position at Hockey Night in Canada, hosting broadcasts on Sirius Satellite Radio channel 122. Marek signed a one-year contract, which involved him vacating his positions at AM 640 Toronto Radio. His new show began on October 1, 2007, airing from 4-6 pm. The show expanded to a three-hour program the following season. One of the most popular sports shows on Sirius-XM, HNIC Radio with Jeff Marek broadcasts a variety of hockey insiders and CBC's Hockey Night in Canada personalities like Kelly Hrudey, Craig Simpson and Cassie Campbell. Moreover, as part of his new duties, Jeff also works with the CBC in their broadcasts of Hockey Night in Canada, he helped debut the I-Desk in the Spring of 2009 with Hockey Hall of Fame sports writer Scott Morrison.. Additionally, Marek continues his position as an on-air personality for Leafs TV broadcasts of Maple Leaf hockey.

Marek called Judo at the 2008 Summer Olympics for CBC.

On July 6, 2011, it was announced that Marek has joined Sportsnet.

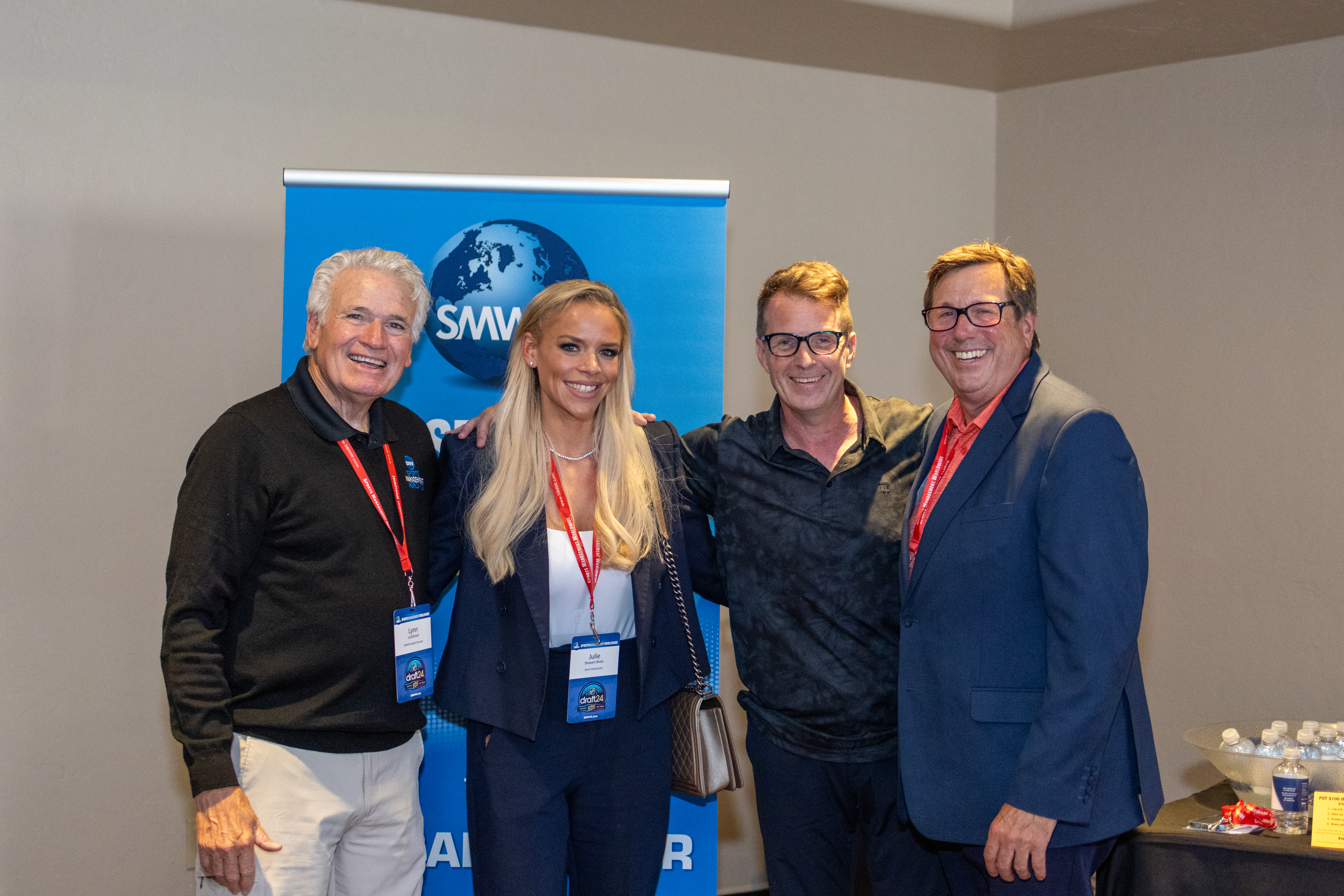
2024 SMWW Hockey Career Conference media panel

Marek left Hockey Night in Canada Radio during the Summer of 2011.

Marek was a co-host on the podcast Marek vs. Wyshynski with Yahoo's Greg Wyshynski for 6 years, ending when Wyshynski moved from Yahoo to ESPN. In the 2021–22 season, Marek was replaced by Caroline Cameron as studio host of Sportsnet's Wednesday Night Hockey, but continued to serve as an inside reporter for the network. He also co-hosted the Sportsnet-produced podcast 32 Thoughts with Elliotte Friedman.

Marek is also an annual NHL Draft Hockey Career Conference speaker for the online sports-career training school Sports Management Worldwide.

In July 2024, Marek was quietly dismissed from Sportsnet, with two years remaining on his contract, because he leaked selections from the first round of the 2024 NHL entry draft one or two minutes before they were announced to his friend Mark Seidel; Marek had been presenting on the television broadcast of the draft and was privy to the selections ahead of their official announcement as a member of the crew. While no gambling was involved, Seidel posted the information on Twitter, which alerted league authorities to the potential of a possible leak before the first round had concluded; Seidel had previously correctly predicted several first round selections on Twitter moments before the picks were officially announced. Seidel was reportedly cleared of wrongdoing. Marek had been silent for several weeks after the June 28 first round of the draft, missing several scheduled radio and podcasts appearances and not posting online, before the separation was officially announced on July 26, though revealed by insiders a day earlier. The incident was investigated by the Nevada Gaming Control Board after the NHL alerted the agency to the leaks.

As of 2026, Marek hosts a podcast, The Sheet with Jeff Marek on the Nation Network and co-hosts the podcast, Hockey Lifers with former NHL head coach and player Bruce Boudreau on the Monumental Sports Network, which holds exclusive regional broadcasting rights for the Washington Capitals and the NBA's Washington Wizards.

== Personal life ==
Jeff was adopted. He has since reconnected with his biological mother; however, he has never met his biological father. On the January 5, 2016, podcast episode of Marek Vs Wyshynski, Jeff declared his desire to find his biological father but didn't know where to begin.

He's married to Claire, and has two sons, Brody and T.J. He has been a vegan since 2008.

Jeff has said that "Dope Fiends and Boozehounds" by the Rheostatics is his favourite song.

Marek was originally slated to pursue a Ph.D. in English before accepting an entry-level position with TheFan590, which would eventually become Sportsnet radio.
