= Highland Creek, Toronto =

Highland Creek
- Neighbourhood
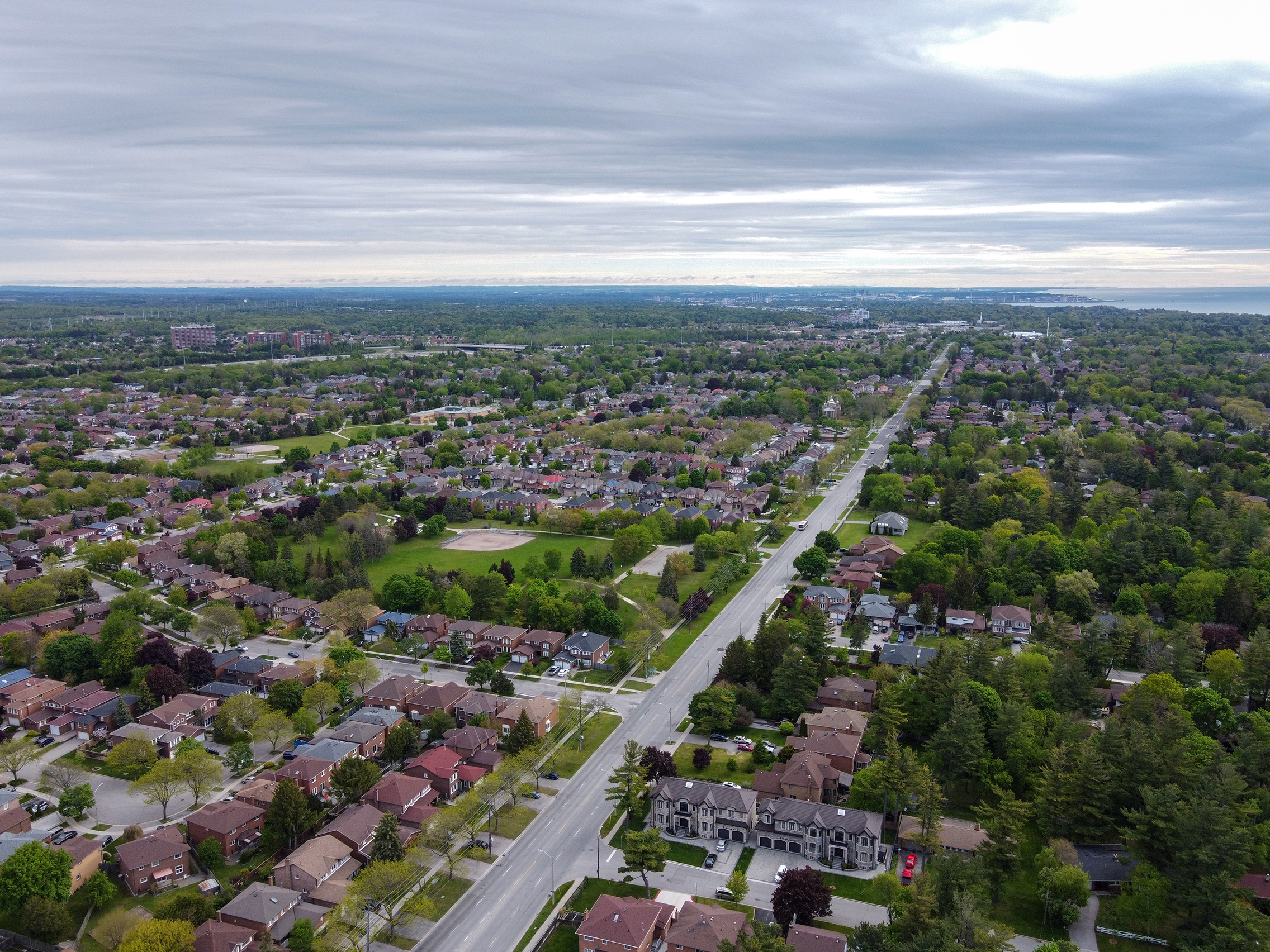
- Aerial view of Ellesmere Road in Highland Creek

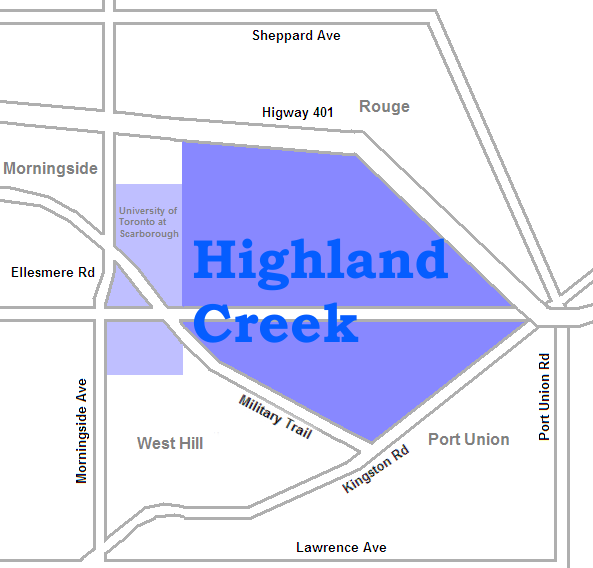

- Location in Toronto
- Coordinates: 43°47′21″N 79°10′29″W
- Country: Canada
- Province: Ontario
- City: Toronto
- Established municipality: 1850 Scarborough Township
- Changed municipality: 1998 Toronto from City of Scarborough

Government
  - MP: Gary Anandasangaree (Scarborough—Rouge Park)
  - MPP: Andrea Hazell (Scarborough-Guildwood)
  - Councillor: Paul Ainslie (Ward 24 Scarborough Guildwood)

Highland Creek is a neighbourhood in eastern Toronto, Ontario, Canada. It is located along the southern portion of the river of the same name in the former suburb of Scarborough. To the east are the neighbourhoods of Port Union and West Rouge, to the west West Hill and Woburn, and to the south Centennial Scarborough.

The western portion of the neighbourhood is occupied by the University of Toronto Scarborough, a feature landmark in the area and a busy pedestrian centre. After the opening of the campus, the neighbourhood was developed primarily into residential areas. Areas dominated by wildlife, which is located along the Highland Creek valley, were left alone. Some shops and a church exist along the commercial Old Kingston Road.

== History ==
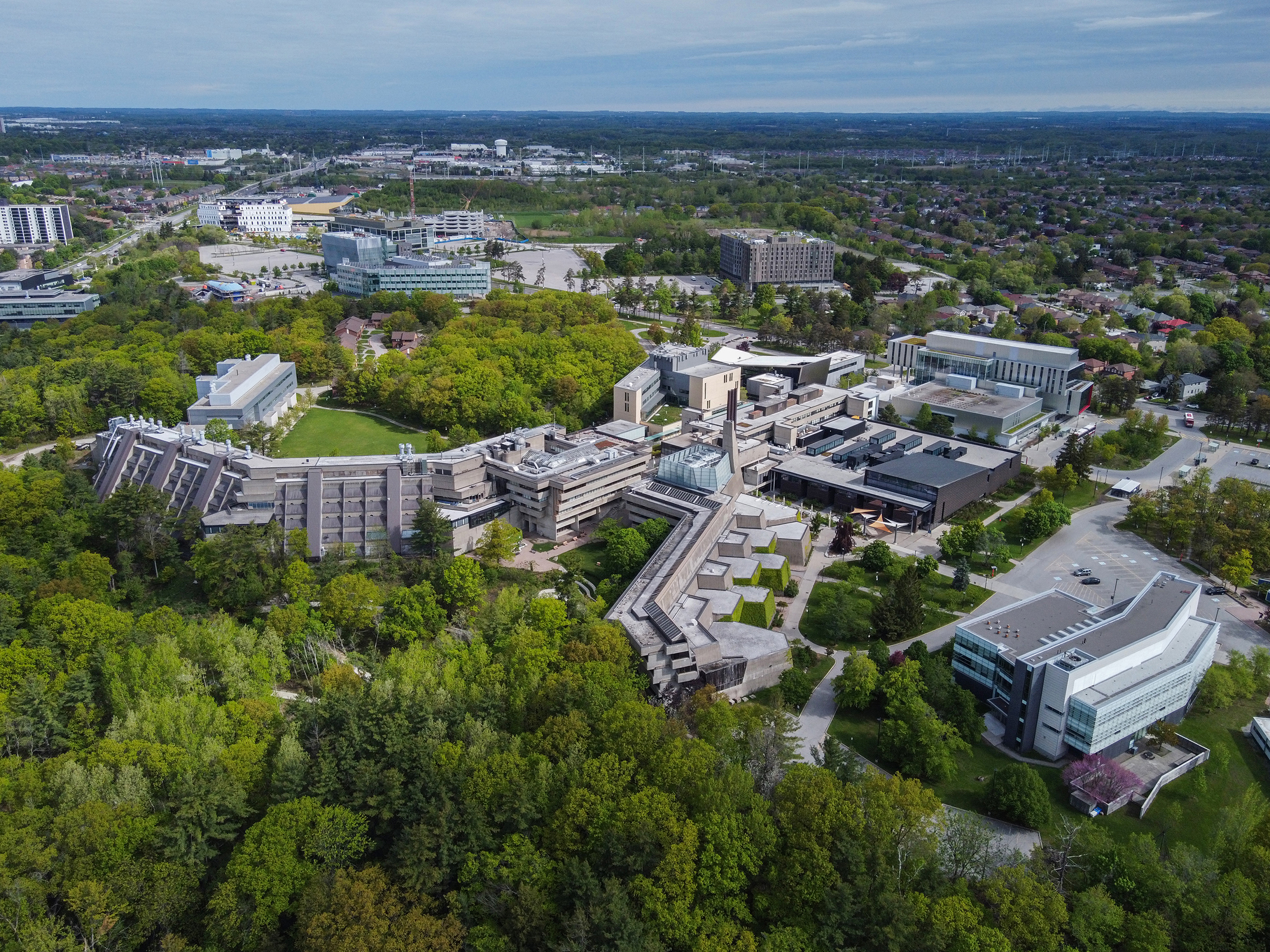
In 1966, the University of Toronto opened its Scarborough campus in Highland Creek.

Like many creeks and river valleys in Toronto, evidence of First Nations occupation has been found in this area. A 2005 excavation by the Toronto and Region Conservation Authority near the mouth of Highland Creek found evidence of a Late Woodland or Early Archaic site, thought to have been a place of tool manufacture. The Helliwell family, one of the first settlers in the area, accumulated a large number of artifacts from the last 5,000 years.

The Highland Creek area was one of the first areas to be occupied by European settlers in the area of what would later become the Township of Scarborough. This is mainly due to the presence of Highland Creek, the river that runs through the neighbourhood, whose valley is occupied by large trees and wildlife. During the 18th and early-19th centuries, the area was home to vast farmlands and homes. In 1954, Hurricane Hazel destroyed many dwellings in the area and contributed to the flooding of the creek.

In 1963, the University of Toronto purchased the western part of the land from E. L. MacLean, who acquired the land from its original owner Miller Lash, a businessman from Old Toronto who built an estate on the land, now known as the Miller Lash House, in 1911. The university eventually built and opened Scarborough College, which is today known as the University of Toronto Scarborough (UTSC), one of the three campuses of the university. The campus was opened in 1965.

== Education ==
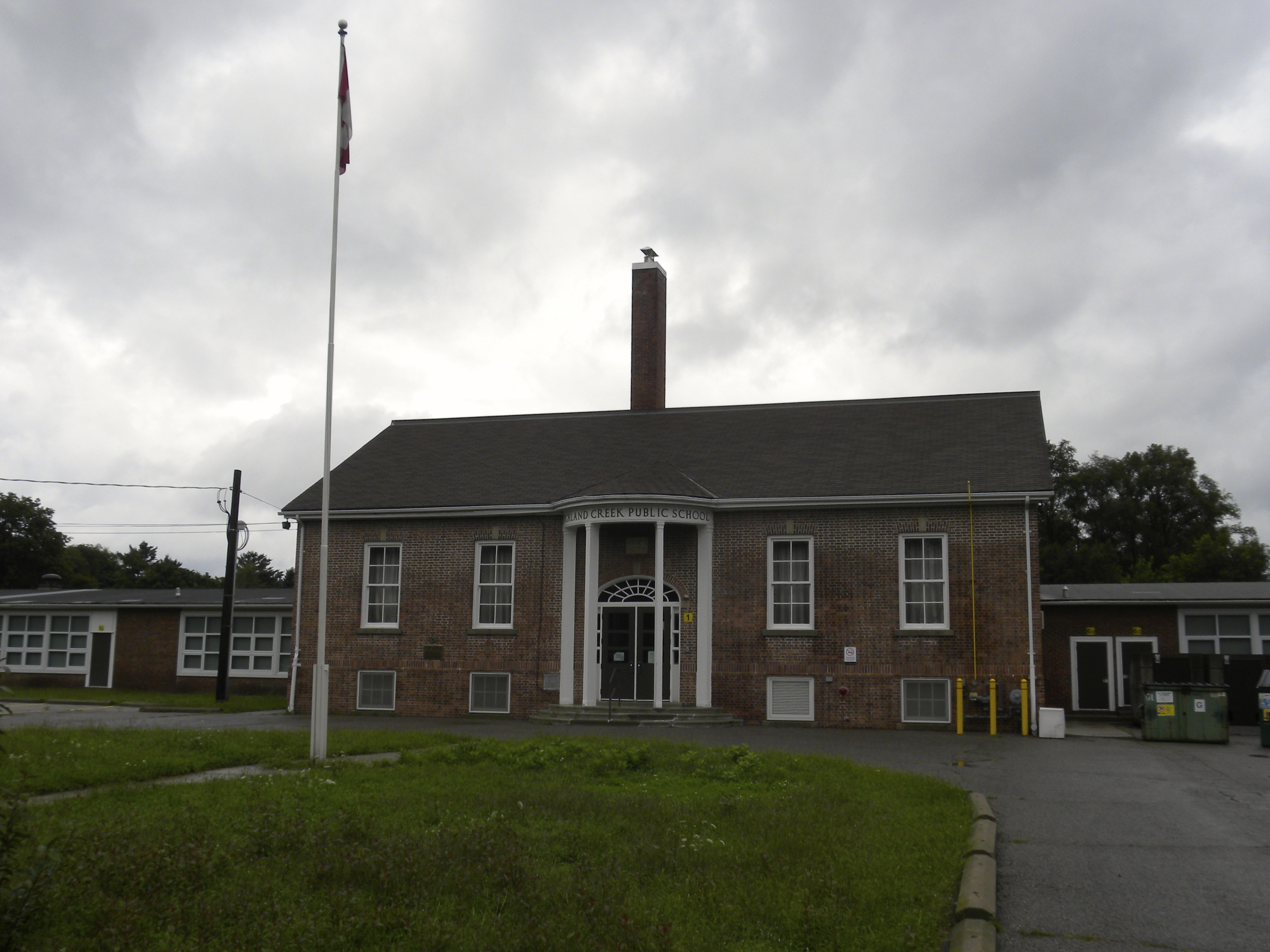
Highland Creek Public School is one of four elementary schools located in the neighbourhood.

Two public school boards operate elementary schools in Highland Creek, the separate Toronto Catholic District School Board (TCDSB), and the secular Toronto District School Board (TDSB). TDSB operates three public elementary schools, Highland Creek, Meadowvale, and Morrish Public School. TCDSB operates one elementary school in the area, Cardinal Leger Catholic School.

Neither TCDSB, or TDSB operate a secondary school in the neighbourhood, with TCDSB/TDSB students residing in the neighbourhood attending secondary schools in adjacent areas. The French-first language public secular school board, Conseil scolaire Viamonde, and it separate counterpart, Conseil scolaire catholique MonAvenir also offer schooling to applicable residents of Highland Creek, although they do not operate a school in the neighbourhood, with CSCM/CSV students attending schools situated in other neighbourhoods in Toronto.

Along with elementary schools, two public post-secondary institutions operate campuses in Highland Creek. Centennial College's Morningside Campus is located along Highland Creek's western boundary on Morningside Avenue. The University of Toronto also operates a large campus in the neighbourhood, the University of Toronto Scarborough, which enrols more than 15,000 students.

== Transportation ==
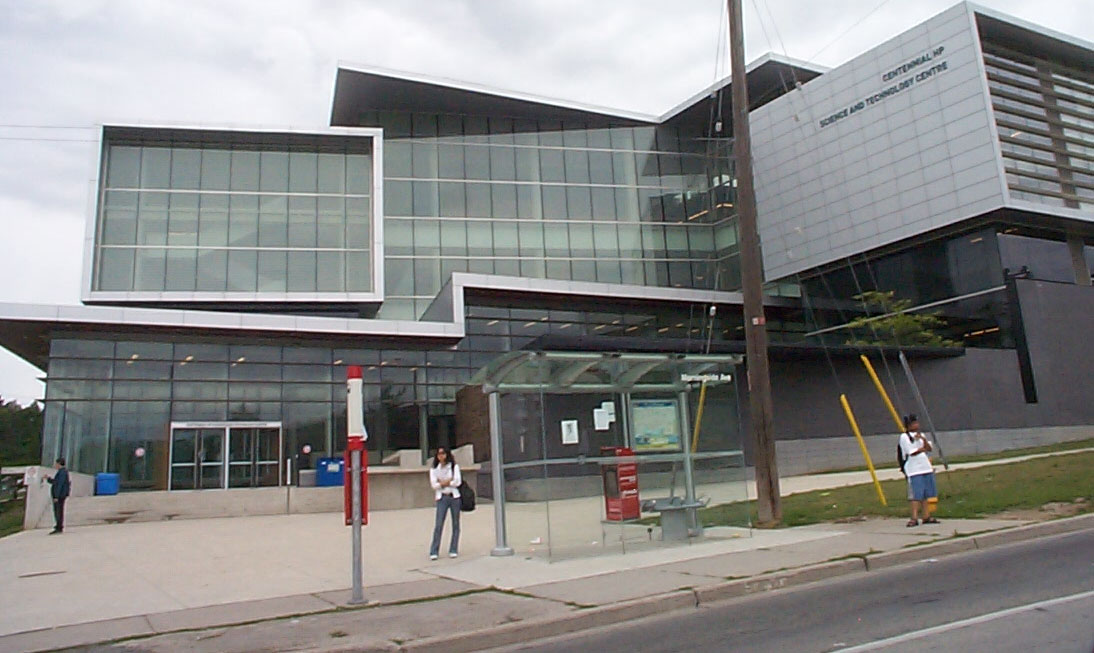
A TTC bus stop in front on Ellesmere Road and Morningside Avenue.

As it is located along Old Kingston Road, which was a former provincial highway that connected Toronto and Kingston, Ontario, it is home to some of the oldest buildings in Scarborough. Ontario Highway 2A runs just south of the neighbourhood's core. Other major roadways in the neighbourhood include Meadowvale Road, and Morningside Avenue, which also acts as the neighbourhood's western boundary. Highway 401 is a major east–west controlled access highway that bisects Greater Toronto.

=== Public transit ===
Toronto Transit Commission (TTC) bus route 38 is named after the neighbourhood and runs 7 days a week, between Scarborough Centre station and the Rouge Hill GO Station, along Ellesmere Road, Military Trail, Lawson Road, and Port Union Road. 12 Kingston Road, 54 Lawrence East, 85 Sheppard East, 86 Scarborough, 95 York Mills, 116 Morningside, 905 Eglinton East Express, 954 Lawrence East Express, 986 Scarborough Express, and 995 York Mills Express also serve parts of the neighbourhood. GO Transit commuter coach route 51, and Durham Region Transit routes 900 and 923 may be accessed at the University of Toronto Scarborough bus terminal.

== Amenities ==
Snappy Food Mart, located at the corner of Morrish Road and Ellesmere, where there is also a Toronto Public Library branch.

The Toronto Pan Am Sports Centre serves the community and is owned by both the city of Toronto and the University of Toronto.

== See also ==
- Toronto ravine system
