= West Rouge =

- Neighbourhood
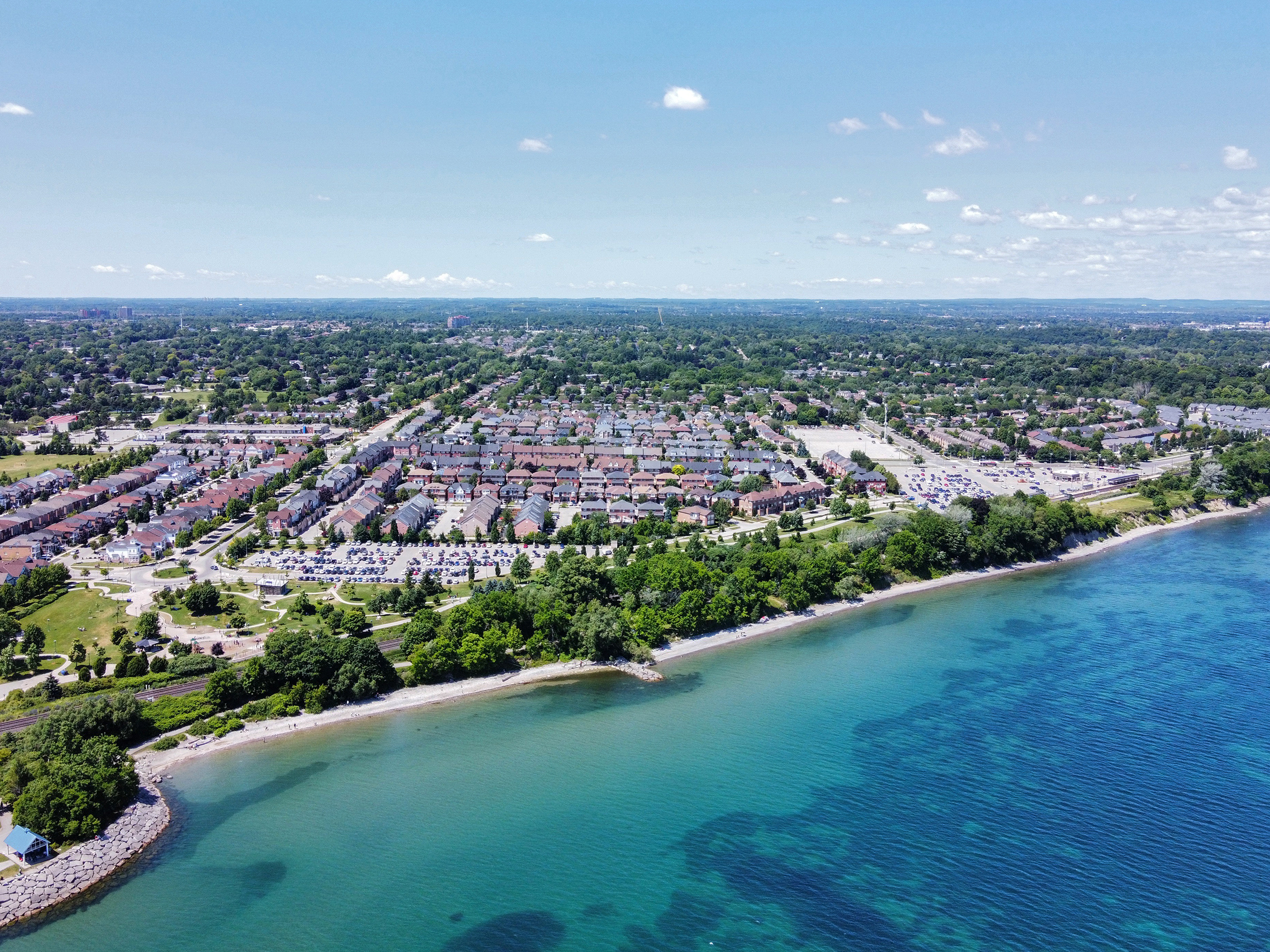
- Aerial view of a residences in West Rouge in 2024

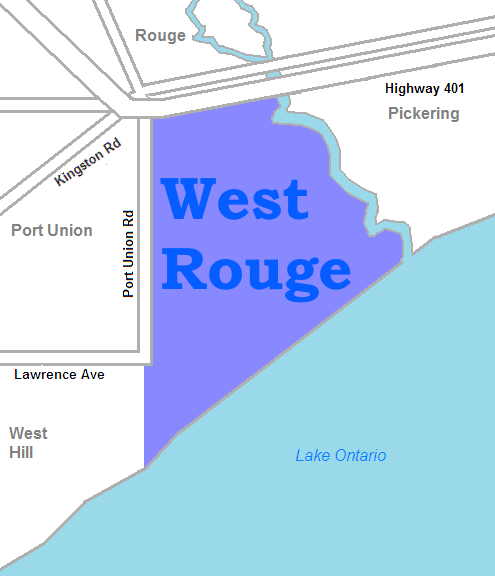
- Coordinates: 43°47′07″N 79°07′33″W
- Country: Canada
- Province: Ontario
- City: Toronto
- Established: 1811 Pickering Township
- Changed Municipality: 1974 Scarborough from Pickering
- Changed Municipality: 1998 Toronto from Scarborough

Government
  - MP: Gary Anandasangaree (Scarborough—Guildwood—Rouge Park)
  - MPP: Vijay Thanigasalam (Scarborough—Rouge Park)
  - Councillor: Neethan Shan (Ward 25 Scarborough—Rouge Park)

West Rouge is a neighbourhood in Toronto, Ontario, Canada. It is located in the south-east corner of Toronto, within the former city of Scarborough. The community is roughly bounded by Lake Ontario to the south, the Rouge River and the Rouge National Urban Park to the east, Port Union Road to the west and Kingston Road to the north.

== History ==
The area was recorded as being settled as early as 1798, when a crown patent for lots 29, 30, 32 & 33, "Con. 1 with the Broken Front, Township of Pickering, County of York and Home District, Province of Upper Canada", was granted to William Holmes, Esquire. From the 1802 survey of Pickering Deputy Provincial Surveyor General Sir David Smith held 4800 acres land on the east side of the Broken Front from the shoreline of Lake Ontario to 2nd Concession. In 1843 Henry Cowan, an immigrant from Ayr, Scotland, bought lots 32 & 33 from Holmes and settled the land with his family. In 1848 Cowan sold a small portion of his land on the shores of Lake Ontario to the Grand Trunk Railway Company. In 1852 it became part of Ontario County.

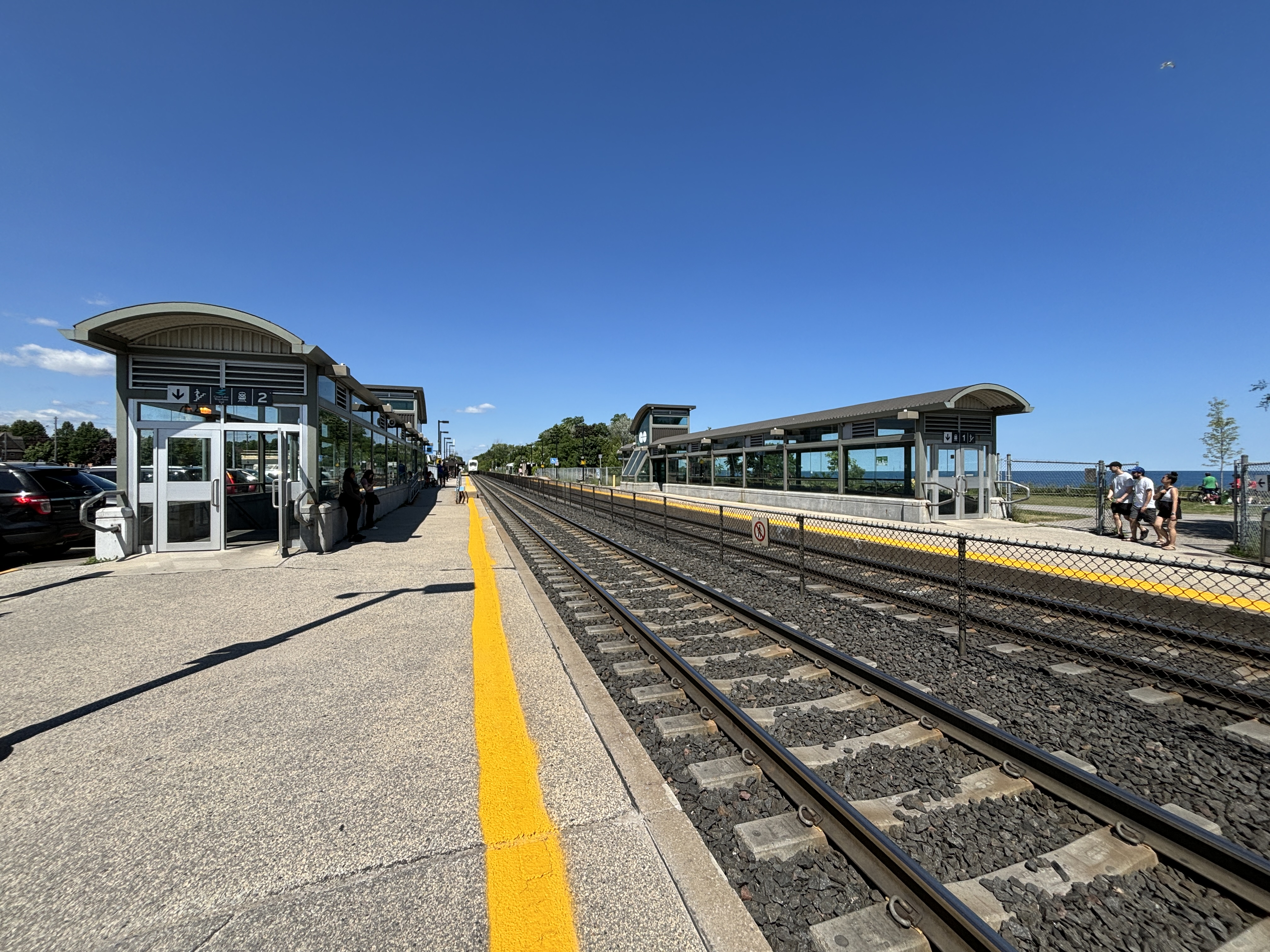
Rouge Hill GO Station opened in southwestern West Rouge in 1967.

In the years following, much of the land was sold. In 1948, the land that is now a housing development between Rouge Hills Dr. and Ridgewood was sold to Rouge Hills Golf and Country Club Limited. The country club and golf course were closed in 1973. In May 1967, Rouge Hill GO Station was opened at the southwestern boundary of West Rouge, providing residents of the neighbourhood access to GO Transit's commuter rail network.

Until 1974 West Rouge was not part of current City of Toronto or the former City/Borough of Scarborough, but it was considered part of the township of Pickering. When Ontario County was reorganized as Durham Region that year, it was transferred to the then-borough of Scarborough under Metropolitan Toronto.

== Education ==
The neighbourhood is home to several elementary schools operated by two public school boards, the Toronto District School Board (TDSB), and the Toronto Catholic District School Board (TCDSB).

Prior to the area's annexation by Toronto, the schools in the area were either administered by the Ontario County Board of Education (now Durham District School Board), and the Ontario County Catholic Board (now Durham Catholic District School Board). Following the neighbourhood's annexation in 1976, secular public schools were managed by the Scarborough Board of Education (later merged with the TDSB), and the Metro Toronto Separate School Board (later reorganized into the TCDSB).

The following elementary schools operate in West Rouge (with the managing school board in parentheses):

- Joseph Howe Senior Public School (TDSB) - opened 1977
- West Rouge Junior Public School (TDSB) - opened 1954
- William G. Davis Junior Public School (TDSB) - opened 1967

Sir Oliver Mowat Collegiate Institute (TDSB) is a public secondary school located in Port Union, adjacent to West Rouge.

The area is also a short distance from two public post-secondary campuses in nearby Highland Creek. Centennial College's Morningside Campus is located along Highland Creek's western boundary on Morningside Avenue. The University of Toronto also operates a campus in the neighbourhood known as the University of Toronto Scarborough (UTSC). Both institutions are an approximately 8 minute drive, or 15 minute bus ride away from West Rouge.

== Recreation ==
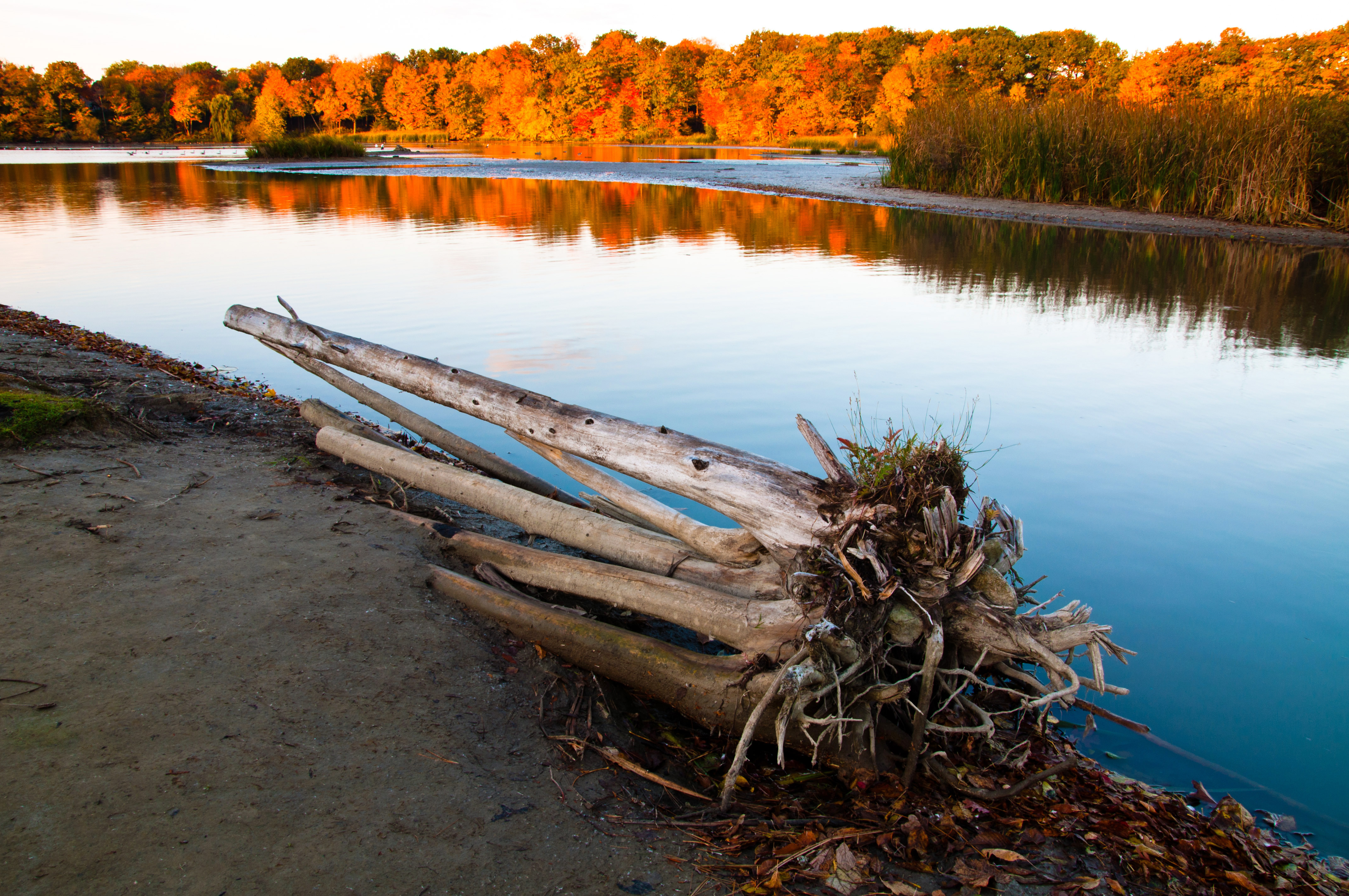
Rouge Pond at Rouge National Urban Park. A portion of the national urban park is located in West Rouge.

The neighbourhood of West Rouge is home to several municipal parks managed by the Toronto Parks, Forestry and Recreation Division, such as West Rouge Park. In addition to municipal parks, the neighbourhood is also home to a portion of the Rouge National Urban Park, the only national urban park in Canada. Rouge National Urban Park is situated along the western boundary of the city, with the mouth of the Rouge River located within the neighbourhood.

The West Rouge community is also the home of a large soccer club, known as the West Rouge Storm. It has house leagues and rep soccer teams for boys and girls.
