= Jeff Blair =

Canadian newspaper columnist

- Born: March 30, 1960 (age 66); Kingston, Ontario, Canada
- Occupations: Newspaper Columnist and Sports Broadcaster
- Notable credit(s): The Globe and Mail and Sportsnet

Jeff Blair (born March 30, 1960) is a Canadian former newspaper columnist for The Globe and Mail, a sports columnist for Sportsnet and sports talk radio host on Sportsnet 590 The FAN in Toronto.

In June 2019, Blair took over as a host of the long-running, nationally syndicated evening sports radio show Prime Time Sports (also simulcast on television via Sportsnet 360), with co-hosts Stephen Brunt or Richard Deitsch. In October 2019, with the end of Prime Time Sports, Blair, Brunt and Deitsch moved to a mid-afternoon time slot with the debut of Writers Bloc.

Blair was previously a sports columnist for The Globe and Mail and a baseball beat reporter for The Montreal Gazette. In 2012, he also wrote a book, Full Count: Four Decades of Blue Jays Baseball. He began his career as a 19-year-old in 1979.

In 2010, Blair was named to the roll of honour of the Manitoba Sportswriters and Sportscasters Association. In 2018, Blair was awarded the Jack Graney Award by the Canadian Baseball Hall of Fame as "a member of the media who has made significant contributions to baseball in Canada through their life’s work."

Since 2021, Blair has co-hosted the podcast Blair and Barker alongside former MLB player Kevin Barker, which airs during the baseball season and is also broadcast on Sportsnet.

== Personal life ==
Blair was born in Kingston, Ontario, but raised in Morden, Manitoba. He went to school at the University of Manitoba. As of 2012, Blair resides in Hamilton, Ontario with his wife Shelley and daughter Emma Rose.
