= Steve Dangle =

Canadian sports analyst

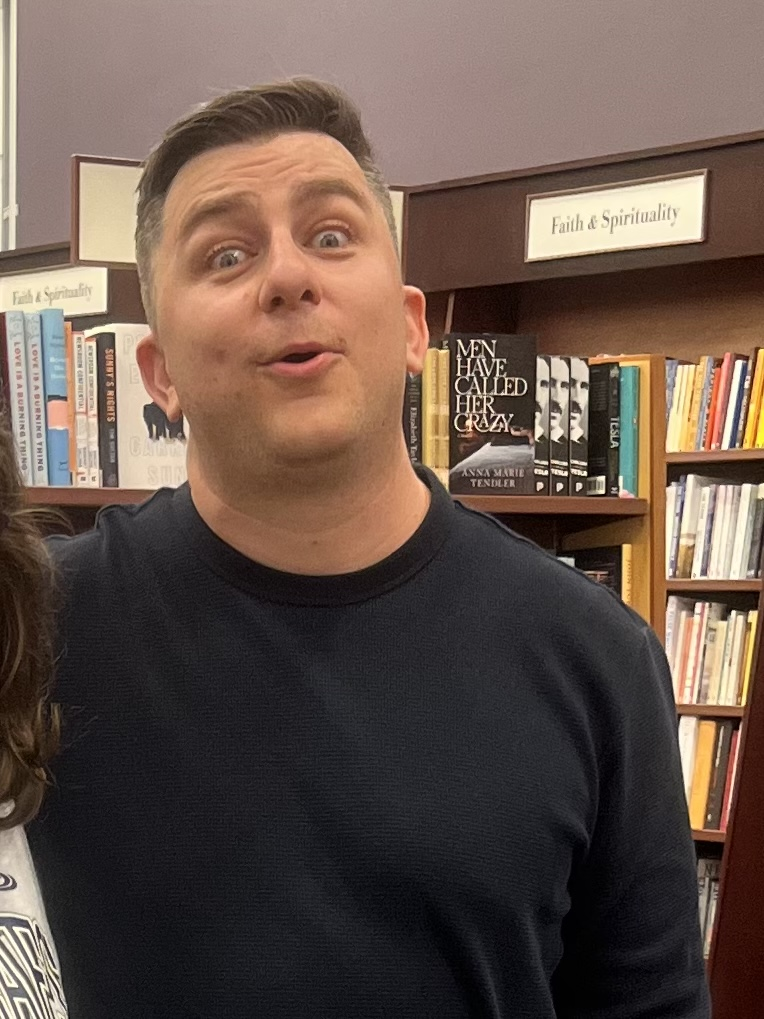
- Dangle in 2024
- Born: Steven Paul Glynn; March 12, 1988 (age 38); Toronto, Ontario, Canada
- Education: Sir Oliver Mowat Collegiate Institute; Ryerson University
- Occupations: Sports analyst; Author; Streamer
- Years active: 2007–present
- Spouse: Sarah-Louise Glynn (m. 2014)
- Children: 2

Twitch information
- Channel: SteveDangle
- Years active: 2017–present
- Followers: 2.9K

YouTube information
- Channels: SteveDangle; Steve Dangle Podcast
- Subscribers: 255,000 (SteveDangle); 150,000 (Steve Dangle Podcast)
- Views: 93.5 million (SteveDangle); 87.8 million (Steve Dangle Podcast)
- Last updated: September 23, 2025

Steven Paul Glynn (born March 12, 1988), known professionally as Steve Dangle, is a Canadian ice hockey analyst, author and internet personality.

== Early life and education ==
Glynn was born on March 12, 1988, in Toronto. He attended Sir Oliver Mowat Collegiate Institute in Scarborough before graduating from Ryerson University.

== Career ==
Dangle began his career in 2007, at the age of 19, when he began posting hockey-related content to YouTube. Dangle quickly gained support from fellow Toronto Maple Leafs fans and grew his social media presence.

Dangle is well known for his web series Leafs Fan Reaction, which is often shortened to LFR in which he reacts to every single Leafs game. He also hosts Watch a Leafs Game with Steve Dangle, and has a podcast, The Steve Dangle Podcast, which features him and his childhood friend and fellow analyst, Adam Wylde, alongside Jesse Blake, discussing hockey.

In 2014, Dangle began working for Sportsnet. He started off working behind the scenes until eventually he began hosting hockey events and producing videos for their YouTube channel and website as well as writing articles for them. He also runs the web series Steve's Dang-Its and Steve's Hat-Picks for Sportsnet. On November 22, 2018, Dangle also hosted live television on Sportsnet as a stand-in host on Tim and Sid alongside Sid Seixeiro filling in for regular co-host Tim Micallef.

In 2019, Dangle released a book documenting his life and career titled This Team Is Ruining My Life (But I Love Them): How I Became A Professional Hockey Fan.

In 2020, Dangle received media coverage after his video reporting on the Leafs losing to the Carolina Hurricanes, who had Toronto Marlies zamboni driver David Ayres as an emergency goaltender, went viral in Canada and the United States.

In 2021, Dangle, Wylde, and Blake started the Steve Dangle Podcast Network (SDPN). The SDPN now has over 15 shows and 24 employees

In 2023, he left Sportsnet after 8 years to work for SDPN full time.

== Personal life ==
Dangle and his wife have two children; they live in Ajax.

== Written works ==
- Glynn, Steve "Dangle" (2019). This Team Is Ruining My Life (But I Love Them): How I Became A Professional Hockey Fan. ISBN 978-1-77-041444-0
- Glynn, Steve “Dangle” (2024). “Hockey Rants and Raves.” ISBN 9781443469968
