= Scarborough—Rouge Park (federal electoral district) =

Federal electoral district in Ontario, Canada

Ontario electoral district
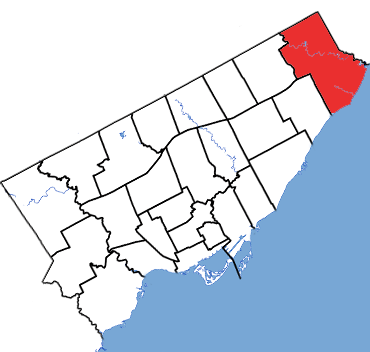
- Scarborough-Rouge Park in relation to the other Toronto ridings (2015 boundaries)
- Coordinates: 43.816°N 79.178°W

Federal electoral district
- Legislature: House of Commons
- District created: 2013
- District abolished: 2023
- First contested: 2015
- Last contested: 2021
- District webpage: profile, map

Demographics
- Population (2021): 102,254
- Electors (2015): 71,291
- Area (km²): 57
- Census division: Toronto
- Census subdivision: Toronto

Scarborough—Rouge Park is a former federal electoral district in Ontario, Canada, that was represented in the House of Commons of Canada from 2015 to 2025.

Scarborough—Rouge Park was created by the 2012 federal electoral boundaries redistribution and was legally defined in the 2013 representation order. It came into effect upon the call of the 42nd Canadian federal election that took place on October 19, 2015. It was created out of parts of the electoral districts of Pickering—Scarborough East (49%), Scarborough—Rouge River (36%) and Scarborough—Guildwood (14%).

== Geography ==
The riding consists of the eastern part of the Scarborough district of Toronto. It contains the neighbourhoods of Rouge, Port Union, West Rouge, Highland Creek, West Hill (east of Morningside Avenue) and Malvern (east of Neilson Road).

== Demographics ==
According to the 2021 Canadian census

Ethnic groups: 35.4% South Asian, 23.6% White, 15.0% Black, 8.9% Filipino, 4.4% Chinese, 1.4% Latin American, 1.3% West Asian, 1.1% Southeast Asian, 1.0% Arab
Languages: 55.2% English, 10.6% Tamil, 4.3% Tagalog, 1.9% Bengali, 2.1% Urdu, 1.8% Cantonese, 1.5% Punjabi, 1.4% Gujarati, 1.1% Mandarin, 1.0% Hindi
Religions: 47.9% Christian (22.9% Catholic, 2.8% Anglican, 2.5% Christian Orthodox, 2.5% Pentecostal, 1.3% United Church, 1.2% Baptist, 1.1% Presbyterian, 13.6% Other), 20.0% Hindu, 12.0% Muslim, 1.4% Sikh, 1.1% Buddhist, 17.0% None
Median income: $37,200 (2020)
Average income: $47,840 (2020)

== Members of Parliament ==
This riding has elected the following members of Parliament:

Parliament	Years	Member	Party
Scarborough—Rouge Park; Riding created from Pickering—Scarborough East, Scarborough-Guildwood and Scarborough—Rouge River
42nd	2015–2019	Gary Anandasangaree	Liberal
43rd	2019–2021	Gary Anandasangaree	Liberal
44th	2021–2025	Gary Anandasangaree	Liberal
Riding dissolved into Scarborough—Guildwood—Rouge Park and Scarborough North

== Election results ==
Graph of election results in Scarborough—Rouge Park since 2011 (parties that never received at least 2% of the vote are omitted)

2021 Canadian federal election
Party	Candidate	Votes	%	±%	Expenditures
Liberal	Gary Anandasangaree	28,702	62.8	+0.6	$71,573.02
Conservative	Zia Choudhary	9,628	21.1	+1.0	$21,191.05
New Democratic	Kingsley Kwok	6,068	13.3	+1.8	$1,821.27
People's	Asad Rehman	1,322	2.9	+2.0	$0.00
Total valid votes/Expense limit		45,720	99.2	–	$108,684.77
Total rejected ballots		350	0.8		
Turnout		46,070	61.3		
Eligible voters		75,105			
Liberal hold		Swing		-0.2	
Source: Elections Canada

2019 Canadian federal election
Party	Candidate	Votes	%	±%	Expenditures
Liberal	Gary Anandasangaree	31,360	62.2	+1.96	$93,933.93
Conservative	Bobby Singh	10,115	20.1	−7.26	$18,116.82
New Democratic	Kingsley Kwok	5,801	11.5	+1.14	none listed
Green	Jessica Hamilton	2,330	4.6	+2.57	none listed
People's	Dilano Sally	467	0.9	–	none listed
Christian Heritage	Mark Theodoru	353	0.7	–	none listed
Total valid votes/expense limit		50,426	100.0		
Total rejected ballots		322			
Turnout		50,748	66.4		
Eligible voters		76,408			
Liberal hold		Swing		+4.61	
Source: Elections Canada

2015 Canadian federal election
Party	Candidate	Votes	%	±%	Expenditures
Liberal	Gary Anandasangaree	29,913	60.24	+25.48	$144,189.04
Conservative	Leslyn Lewis	13,587	27.36	-4.23	$59,291.73
New Democratic	KM Shanthikumar	5,145	10.36	-20.63	$58,736.40
Green	Calvin Winter	1,010	2.03	-0.36	$1,457.51
Total valid votes/expense limit		49,655	100.0	–	$204,974.26
Total rejected ballots		235	0.47	New	
Turnout		49,890	69.98	New	
Eligible voters		71,291			
Source: Elections Canada

2011 federal election redistributed results
Party	Vote	%
Liberal	14,157	34.76
Conservative	12,865	31.59
New Democratic	12,620	30.99
Green	974	2.39
Others	113	0.28

== See also ==
- List of Canadian electoral districts
- Historical federal electoral districts of Canada
