= CJCL =

Sports radio station in Toronto

- Toronto, Ontario; Canada
- Broadcast area: Greater Toronto Area; Southern Ontario
- Frequency: 590 kHz
- Branding: Sportsnet 590 The Fan

Programming
- Language: English
- Format: Sports
- Affiliations: Sportsnet Radio; Toronto Raptors Radio Network; Toronto Maple Leafs Radio Network; Toronto Blue Jays Radio Network; Buffalo Bisons Radio Network; Westwood One Sports

Ownership
- Owner: Rogers Radio; (Rogers Media, Inc.)
- Sister stations: CFTR, CHFI-FM, CKIS-FM, CFMT-DT, CITY-DT, CJMT-DT

History
- First air date: February 21, 1951
- Former call signs: CKFH (1951–1981)
- Former frequencies: 1400 kHz (1951–1959); 1430 kHz (1959–1995)

Technical information
- Licensing authority: CRTC
- Class: B
- Power: 50,000 watts
- Transmitter coordinates: 43°9′10″N 79°32′3″W
- Repeater: 92.5 CKIS-HD3 (Toronto)

Links
- Webcast: Listen live
- Website: sportsnet.ca/590

CJCL (590 AM, Sportsnet 590 The Fan) is a Canadian sports radio station in Toronto, Ontario. Owned and operated by Rogers Radio, a division of Rogers Sports & Media since 2002, CJCL's studios are located at the Rogers Building at Bloor and Jarvis in downtown Toronto, while its transmitters are located at Soybe Road and Park Road South near Grimsby atop the Niagara Escarpment. It is the flagship station for the Toronto Blue Jays, and also airs games from the Toronto Raptors, Toronto Maple Leafs, Buffalo Bisons and Buffalo Bills. CJCL is a Westwood One Sports affiliate.

The station was originally owned by longtime sportscaster Foster Hewitt and began broadcasting on February 21, 1951, as CKFH 1400 before moving to 1430 AM in 1960. Telemedia acquired the station in 1981 and relaunched it as CJCL. During its early life, the station aired news and sports, Top 40, country music, adult contemporary and talk radio formats. It adopted the current sports format on September 4, 1992, as The Fan 1430 as Canada's first all-sports radio station before swapping frequencies with CKYC 590, acquired in 1994 by Telemedia, on February 6, 1995, adopting The Fan 590 branding. After Telemedia was sold to Standard Broadcasting, Rogers acquired CJCL in 2002.

CJCL operates at 50,000 watts, the highest power permitted for AM stations, around the clock. The station's signal is directional from north to south to protect various lower-powered radio stations east and west of the station. Even with this restriction, due to its location near the bottom of the AM dial, as well as its transmitter power and height, CJCL covers most of southern Ontario during the day. Although it is not a clear-channel station, at night it can be heard across most of eastern Canada with a good radio.

CJCL is simulcast across Canada on Bell Satellite TV channel 959, and on Shaw Direct channel 868. It is also carried on the 3rd HD digital subchannel of CKIS-FM.

== History ==
=== CKFH ===
==== Establishment and early programming ====
The station was founded by Toronto hockey broadcaster Foster Hewitt, whose initials formed the “FH” portion of its call sign. In 1950, Hewitt received approval to establish a new Toronto radio station operating on 1400 kHz with a power of 250 watts. Its studios were located at 1 Grenville Street, near Maple Leaf Gardens, while its transmitter was situated on the Toronto Islands.

CKFH began broadcasting on February 21, 1951. Foster Hewitt served as president of Foster Hewitt Broadcasting Limited, Howard Caine was the station's first general manager, and Hewitt's son Bill Hewitt was sports and special-events director. The station operated around the clock, carrying hourly newscasts as well as music, drama, variety and sports programming. Its early schedule consisted largely of extended programs presented by individual hosts, while the evening program The Main Event featured sports reports, interviews and live coverage.

Sports were central to CKFH's identity. The station carried Toronto Maple Leafs broadcasts and promoted itself during the 1950s as “The Sportsman's Station”. Foster Hewitt and later Bill Hewitt called Maple Leafs games, while CKFH also covered junior hockey, horse racing and other amateur and professional sporting events.

In 1952, CKFH reached an agreement to present reconstructed radio broadcasts of Brooklyn Dodgers baseball games using telegraphic reports from games played outside Toronto. The Dodgers cancelled the arrangement after the first broadcast, and CKFH subsequently began legal proceedings against the club.

The station also sold airtime to independent producers serving Toronto's immigrant communities. Johnny Lombardi presented Italian-language programming on CKFH during the 1950s and 1960s, while Sam Yuchtman moved his predominantly Yiddish-language Jewish Hour to the station in 1953. Lombardi remained associated with CKFH until he launched the multilingual station CHIN in 1966.

==== Move to 1430 and power increases ====
On July 29, 1959, CKFH moved from 1400 to 1430 kHz and increased its power from 250 to 5,000 watts during both the day and night. Two additional towers were constructed at the station's existing Toronto Islands transmitter site. At the time, CKFH carried an eclectic schedule that included popular and classical music, children's programming, country music and Italian-language shows. It used the slogan “Radio for Grownups”.

The station increased its daytime power to 10,000 watts in 1964, while retaining a nighttime power of 5,000 watts. In April 1967, it was authorized to operate with 10,000 watts full-time. CKFH increased its power to 50,000 watts in 1970, using a directional antenna system.

==== Rock era ====
During the early and mid-1960s, CKFH generally broadcast a middle-of-the-road music format alongside sports, news, religious and multilingual programming. In 1966, the station began testing youth-oriented music during selected portions of its schedule. Tom Fulton hosted an afternoon teen program while continuing to present conventional daytime music, and a late-night progressive-rock program called The Whole Bag was also introduced.

CKFH adopted a full-time rock and Top 40 format on January 2, 1967, placing it in direct competition with CHUM. Some elements of the previous schedule initially remained, including early-morning religious programming and Italian- and Greek-language programs during the evening.

The station sought to distinguish itself from CHUM with a broader playlist that included Canadian recordings, British releases, rhythm-and-blues records and selected album tracks. Its early rock schedule included The Whole Bag and the overnight rhythm-and-blues program Where It's At. Among the announcers associated with CKFH during the rock era were Don Daynard, Tom Fulton, John Donabie, Keith Hampshire, Duff Roman, Terry David Mulligan, Chuck McCoy and Mike Williams.

According to the CKFH Tribute Page, the station's rock format passed through several phases, including a relatively free-form period in 1967 and early 1968, a more tightly formatted approach later in 1968, an “FM on AM” experiment around 1970 and a more informal presentation during the early 1970s.

CKFH also used a “20-20 News” format, presenting headlines twenty minutes after the hour and longer reports twenty minutes before the hour. The format was modelled on the news presentation used by CKLW in Windsor.

Sports remained an important part of the schedule despite the music format. CKFH continued to broadcast Maple Leafs hockey and carried Montreal Expos baseball games from the club's inaugural season in 1969 through 1976.

By the early 1970s, CKFH faced increased competition from CHUM and FM music stations. The station gradually introduced more oldies and album-oriented music, and adopted a predominantly oldies-based format in 1973 or 1974. It changed to a country music format in March 1975.

==== Country format and the Blue Jays ====
Although country music became CKFH's primary format, the station continued to place considerable emphasis on sports. In 1977, it became the original flagship radio station of the expansion Toronto Blue Jays. The initial Blue Jays network included 16 other stations, including one in Buffalo. Tom Cheek provided play-by-play, with former major-league pitcher Early Wynn as colour commentator.

CKFH lost the Maple Leafs radio rights to the all-news CKO network beginning with the 1978–79 season. The loss was financially damaging because hockey broadcasts had long been central to the station's programming and advertising revenue. CKFH challenged whether live sports broadcasts were compatible with CKO's all-news licence, but the CRTC ruled that the broadcasts were permitted.

The Maple Leafs returned to CKFH in 1980 after CKO relinquished the rights. Ron Hewat called the games with former Maple Leafs player Mike Nykoluk providing colour commentary. By then, however, Foster Hewitt was experiencing health problems and the station had sustained financial losses following the earlier loss of the hockey broadcasts.

==== Sale to Telemedia ====
Foster Hewitt agreed in 1980 to sell CKFH to Telemedia's Ontario broadcasting subsidiary. The sale was completed in February 1981. Telemedia changed the station's mixture of country and adult contemporary music to an adult contemporary format.

On March 21, 1981, the station adopted the name “Metro 1430”. The CKFH call sign was retired and replaced by CJCL on April 10. The change ended the CKFH identity after approximately 30 years.

=== CJCL under Telemedia ===
==== Metro 1430 ====
Following Telemedia's acquisition of CKFH, the station adopted the on-air name Metro 1430 on March 21, 1981. Its call sign was changed from CKFH to CJCL on April 10, and on May 17 the station began broadcasting from renovated studios at 464 Yonge Street, in the same building complex as its former Grenville Street facilities.

Metro 1430 initially broadcast an adult contemporary format combined with a comparatively strong news and information service. At its launch, Telemedia identified CJCL as the flagship of its Ontario radio network. The station employed Larry Silver as news and information director, Mark Nebscher in sports and former CFRB broadcaster Andy Barrie, and scheduled 30 newscasts each day at fifteen and forty-five minutes past the hour.

In early 1983, CJCL temporarily replaced much of its music programming with a talk-oriented format. The schedule included news, interviews, call-in programs and personality-driven talk shows. Among its hosts was Toronto newspaper columnist Paul Rimstead, who presented the late-night program Toronto Nite-Cap.

Rimstead, a longtime columnist for the Toronto Sun, was known for an informal, anecdotal style built around interviews, humour and conversations with guests. The opening of Toronto Nite-Cap was staged before an audience at the Westbury Hotel and drew guests including broadcasters Knowlton Nash and Lorraine Thomson, politician David Crombie, entertainers Don Harron and Catherine McKinnon, and musician Ronnie Hawkins. The contemporary music-industry magazine RPM described the event as a celebrity-filled launch for Rimstead's new CJCL program.

The talk format was short-lived and reportedly performed poorly financially. Former CJCL producer and executive Nelson Millman later recalled that the station employed several talk personalities, including Rimstead and newspaper columnist Earl McRae, but that ownership abandoned the format after its losses mounted. Management briefly considered converting CJCL to country music before instead adopting the syndicated Music of Your Life standards and oldies service in September 1983.

CJCL continued to use the Metro 1430 name for part of this transitional period, although the station increasingly emphasized its call sign and programming rather than the original adult contemporary identity. Following the call-sign change, CJCL continued to broadcast adult contemporary music, news and sports. It briefly adopted a predominantly talk format in early 1983, but returned to adult contemporary music within several months. In September 1983, it changed to a standards and oldies format based on the syndicated Music of Your Life service.

CJCL remained the flagship station of the Toronto Blue Jays, with Tom Cheek and Jerry Howarth calling the games. It also continued to carry Maple Leafs hockey. In 1984, Telemedia received approval to operate a radio network for Maple Leafs broadcasts, while the Telemedia Broadcasting System distributed Blue Jays games and other sports programming by satellite to stations across Canada.

As the Blue Jays became more successful during the 1980s, baseball broadcasts and sports-talk programming became increasingly important to the station. In 1989, CJCL introduced Prime Time Sports, hosted by Bob McCown. The program replaced an earlier call-in show with a magazine-style format built around interviews and sports discussion.

CJCL's non-sports programming during the 1980s and early 1990s included adult contemporary music, oldies, standards and talk programming, but generally performed poorly in the ratings. After the station received an improved response to an expanded daily block of sports programming, it moved toward a full-time sports format.

=== The Fan ===
In March 1992, CJCL introduced all-sports programming during afternoon drive and the evening while retaining oldies music during the remainder of the day. On September 4, it discontinued its remaining music programming and relaunched as The Fan 1430, Canada's first full-time commercial all-sports radio station.

The new schedule included programs hosted by Joe Bowen, Mike Inglis, Steve Simmons, Mary Ormsby, Dan Shulman, Bob McCown, Jim Hunt, Mike Hogan and Norm Rumack. The format combined local sports talk with play-by-play coverage of the Blue Jays, Maple Leafs and other sporting events.

In 1994, Telemedia acquired CKYC, which operated on 590 kHz, from Rogers Communications. At noon on February 6, 1995, CJCL moved from 1430 to 590 kHz and adopted the name The Fan 590. The station also began using CKYC's former 50,000-watt transmitter site near Grimsby, Ontario.

The former 1430 frequency initially continued with satellite-fed country music while Telemedia sought a buyer. It was later acquired by Fairchild Holdings and became multilingual station CHKT.

CJCL ceased to be the Blue Jays flagship station in 1998, when the team's radio broadcasts moved to CHUM. Telemedia was acquired by Standard Broadcasting in 2002, but regulatory concerns required Standard to divest several stations. Rogers acquired CJCL later that year, and Blue Jays broadcasts returned to the station.

On January 12, 2011, Rogers rebranded the station as Sportsnet Radio Fan 590, integrating it more closely with the company's Sportsnet television operations. Its on-air name was subsequently shortened to Sportsnet 590 The Fan.

== Live sports ==
CJCL is the flagship station for the following teams' radio broadcasts:

- Toronto Blue Jays (MLB baseball)
- Toronto Raptors (NBA basketball)♠
- Toronto Maple Leafs (NHL hockey)♠

♠-In case of conflicts with other sports broadcasts, one of the games will air on another station in the Toronto area. As Rogers owns the Blue Jays outright but only shares ownership (through Maple Leaf Sports & Entertainment) of the Raptors and Maple Leafs, the Blue Jays games have first priority on CJCL. CHUM shares rights to the other two teams, including all games that are played at the same time as the Blue Jays. In contrast, because of an exclusive CFL-wide multimedia deal with TSN that ensures all Toronto Argonauts games air on CHUM, any Raptors or Maple Leaf games that conflict with the Argonauts will air on CJCL. The two stations split the broadcasts of games that do not conflict with each other.

Roughly 11 Buffalo Bisons games (as of 2018) air on evening dates between June and August that do not conflict with Blue Jays games. The Bisons are the International League affiliate of the Blue Jays, and broadcasts originate from Buffalo-based WWKB.

The Fan 590 also features live coverage of the following:

- NBA All-Star Game
- Major League Baseball on ESPN Radio (Sunday nights, All-Star Game & postseason; when not conflicting with Blue Jays games & weekday afternoon sports talk radio programming)
- Memorial Cup hockey (championship game)
- NFL Football (Sunday afternoons)

Previous live sports events on CJCL included:

- Toronto Argonauts (CFL football) (2000–2001, 2007–2010)
- Toronto FC (MLS soccer)
- Ice Hockey World Championships (Team Canada games)
- IIHF World Junior Championship (Team Canada games)
- Toronto Rock (NLL lacrosse) (2006)
- OHL All-Star Classic (OHL hockey) (2007)
- International Bowl (NCAA college football) (2007–2010)
- Premier League (soccer) (Saturday mornings, 2007–2010)
- Grey Cup (CFL football) (2007–2009)
- Toronto Marlies (AHL hockey) (2008–2010)
- 2009 World Baseball Classic (All Canada national baseball team games and the final four)
- Ice hockey at the 2010 Winter Olympics – Men's tournament (All Team Canada games, plus the quarter-final game determining Team Canada's semi-final opponent, both semi-finals, and both the bronze medal and gold medal games)
- Ice hockey at the 2010 Winter Olympics – Women's tournament (gold medal game)

== Notable on-air staff ==
=== Current ===
- David Amber
- Kevin Barker
- Jeff Blair
- Joe Bowen (Maple Leafs)
- Stephen Brunt
- Hugh Burrill
- Sam Cosentino
- Richard Deitsch
- Rob Faulds
- Ailish Forfar
- Elliotte Friedman
- Paul Jones
- Ian Leggatt
- Scott Metcalfe
- Tim Micallef
- Sid Seixeiro
- Gord Stellick
- Anthony Stewart
- Dan Shulman (Blue Jays)
- Eric Smith
- Mike Zigomanis

=== Former ===
- Sandy Annunziata
- Jack Armstrong
- Alan Ashby (Blue Jays)
- Bill Berg
- Howard Berger
- Dean Blundell
- Greg Brady
- Tom Cheek
- Don Cherry
- Damien Cox
- Ken Daniels
- John Derringer
- Cal Gardner (Leafs 1970s).
- Dirk Hayhurst
- Mike Hogan
- Jerry Howarth (Blue Jays)
- Jim Hunt
- Rob Iarusci
- Mike Inglis
- Peter Irvine
- Spider Jones
- Jim Kelley
- Andrew Krystal
- Nick Kypreos
- Don Landry
- Jim Lang
- Johnny Lombardi
- Jeff Lumby
- Jeff Marek
- Pat Marsden
- Doug MacLean
- Bob McCown
- Daren Millard
- Rick Moranis (using the stage name Rick Allan)
- Jack Morris (Blue Jays)
- Mark Osborne
- Steve Paikin
- Dan Pollard
- Elliott Price
- Paul Rimstead
- Jim Richards
- Mike Richards
- Greg Sansone
- Chris Schultz
- John Shannon
- James Sharman
- Joe Siddall (Blue Jays; moved to Sportsnet television coverage)
- Steve Simmons
- Chuck Swirsky
- Mike Toth
- Ben Wagner (Blue Jays)
- Bob Weeks
- John Wells
- Brian Williams
- Mike Wilner
- Sam Yuchtman
