= Sam Yuchtman =

Jewish-Canadian radio host (1910–1979)

- Born: January 15, 1910; Lublin, Congress Poland, Russian Empire
- Died: June 26, 1979 (aged 69); Toronto, Canada
- Occupations: Musician and radio host

Sam Yuchtman (January 15, 1910 – June 26, 1979) was a Toronto broadcaster, entertainer and cantor best known for hosting radio shows in Yiddish and English oriented towards the Jewish community in the city.

Yuchtman was born in Lublin, Poland. As a ten-year-old, he began earning money by meeting Jewish actors at the train station and carrying their satchels to the local Yiddish theatre where he would be able to see the shows for free and receive a free meal with the actors after the performance. At 12, he began appearing on stage himself in minor roles. His father, a tailor, moved to Winnipeg and after a few years brought Sam and the rest of the family around 1917. Sam became involved with the Queen's Theatre in Winnipeg and also worked in textiles as a pant presser. He moved to Toronto in 1936, where he became responsible for bringing Yiddish actors to the Standard Theatre on Spadina Avenue and where he also produced and directed several productions.

In 1942, Yuchtman joined folksinger and radio personality Max Mandel as co-host of The Jewish Hour on radio station CKTB in St. Catharines, Ontario, replacing Isaac Swerdlow who had managed and co-hosted the show with Mandel since 1940. Mandel had previously performed on and then co-hosted The Jewish Radio Hour in Toronto, sponsored by the Toronto Yiddish newspaper the Kanader Nayes, on CKCL from 1936 to 1937, and then on various competing Jewish hours on CKOC and CKCL until 1939.

In 1946, Mandel and Yuchtman moved The Jewish Hour (known in Yiddish as Di Yidishe Shtunde) to newly-launched Toronto station CHUM. Mandel left the show in 1950 to devote his time to running the Apter Friendly Society, a landsmanshaft. He rejoined Yuchtman as co-host on February 15, 1953 when the show moved to CKFH only to die hours before the March 8, 1953 show was to air.

Yuchtman continued the program, later moving it to CFGM in the early 1960s, and finally in 1966 to CHIN radio, Toronto's first multilingual radio station, which hired Yuchtman as the station's first producer.

It was one of several competing Jewish, and for many years predominantly Yiddish-language radio programs, broadcasting under that or similar names in Toronto and in Jewish population centres around North America, typically on Sundays. By the 1970s, Sam Yuchtman's Jewish Hour became the longest-running Jewish radio program in Toronto. Yuchtman also hosted Shalom on CHIN, a daily one-hour news, interview, and music show on CHIN which his daughter, Zelda Young, took over in the early 1970s when an ailing Yuchtman reduced his workload. Following his retirement in 1976, Zelda Young took over as host and producer of the Ontario Jewish Hour as well. Both programs eventually became known as The Zelda Show, and broadcast only in English. Zelda Young hosted the show until her death in September 2023 at the age of 73.

During the Six-Day War in 1967, Yuchtman raised $57,000 in aid for Israel during a 90-minute special fundraising broadcast.

Yuchtman ran for council in North York, Ontario in the 1966 municipal election but lost to Robert Yuill.
