= Port Union, Toronto =

Port Union
- Neighbourhood
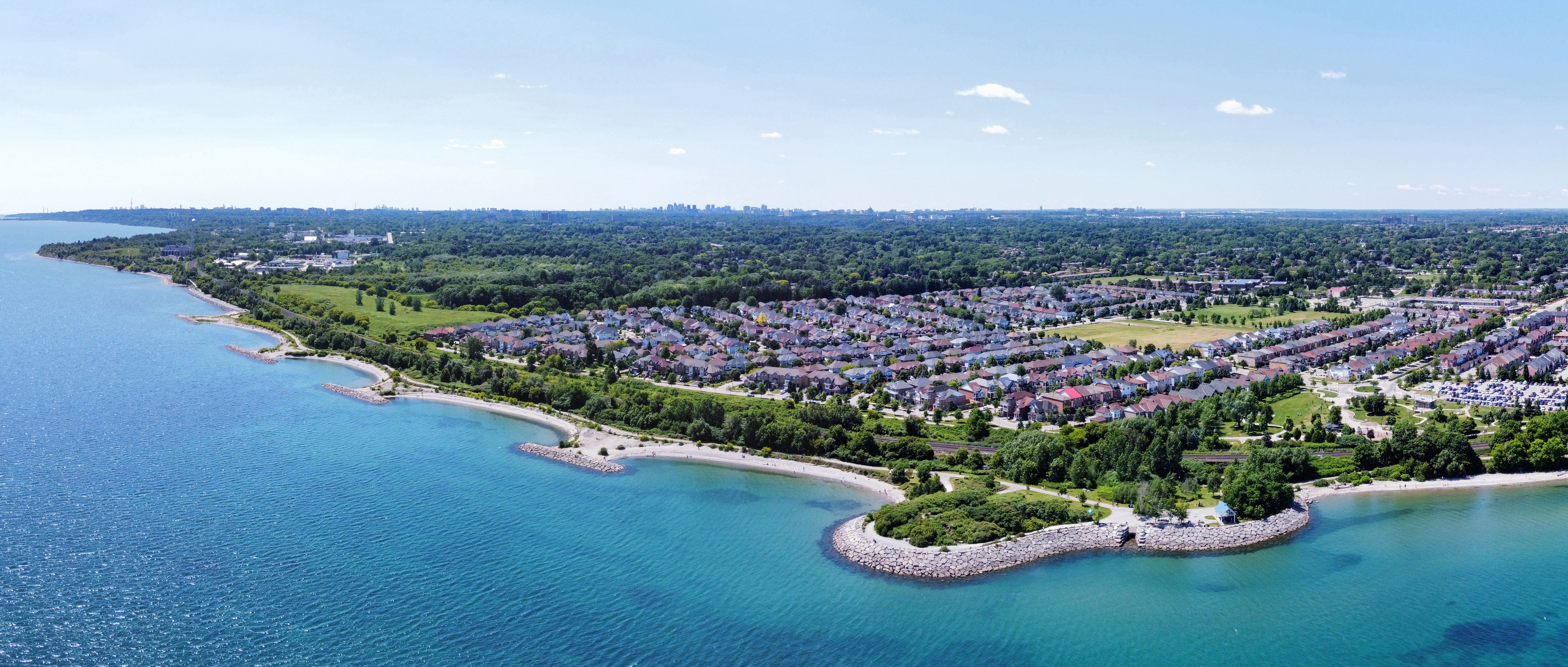
- Aerial view of Port Union, Toronto in 2024

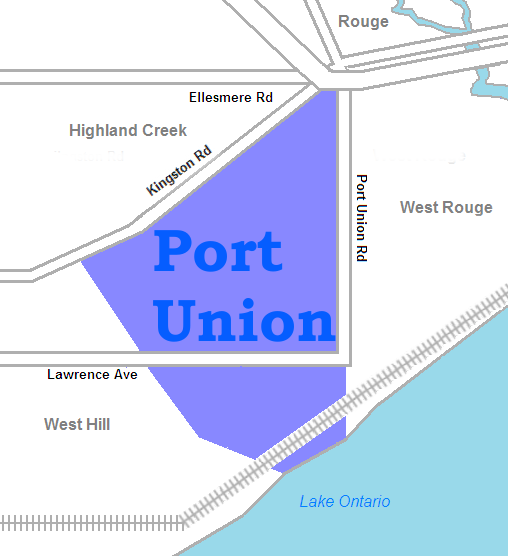
- Coordinates: 43°46′44″N 79°08′03″W
- Country: Canada
- Province: Ontario
- City: Toronto
- Established: 1850 Scarborough Township
- Changed municipality: 1998 Toronto from City of Scarborough

Government
  - MP: Gary Anandasangaree (Scarborough—Rouge Park)
  - MPP: Vijay Thanigasalam (Scarborough—Rouge Park)
  - Councillor: Neethan Shan (Ward 25 Scarborough—Rouge Park)

Port Union, also known as Centennial Scarborough, is a neighbourhood in Toronto, Ontario, Canada. It is located in the south-east corner of Toronto, within the former city of Scarborough. The neighbourhood is bounded by Kingston Road to the north, Port Union Road to the east, the Lake Ontario shoreline to the south, and Highland Creek to the west.

The neighbourhood originated as the small lakefront town of Port Union in the 19th century, within the area now known as West Rouge, until 1974 part of the Township of Pickering. It was later developed as a suburban bedroom community after the Second World War. Since the 1990s, the industrial lands along the waterfront have been transformed into new subdivisions, along with a paved walkway and bike path along the shore of Lake Ontario. The neighbourhood has many mature trees, parkland and waterfront. It is an affluent neighbourhood with 93% home ownership.

== History ==
The area was settled in Charles Annis (1793) and by Thomas Adams (1808), but a community did not emerge until the 1830s.

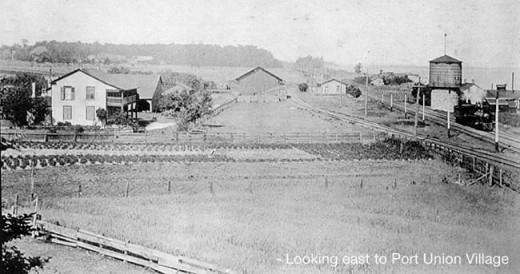
View of Port Union Village and the Grand Trunk Railway station in Port Union.

The original village of Port Union was founded in the early to mid-1800s immediately south-east of the current-day intersection of Port Union Rd and Lawrence Avenue. While currently part of Toronto, the original area of the community was within Pickering Township. By 1865 the community had a post office.

In 1974, as part of the municipal government reforms that introduced the Regional Municipality of Durham, the West Rouge area of Pickering (bordered by Port Union Rd in the west, the Rouge River in the east, and Twyn Rivers Drive in the north) was annexed by Scarborough, which in turn was amalgamated into Toronto in 1998.

== Education ==
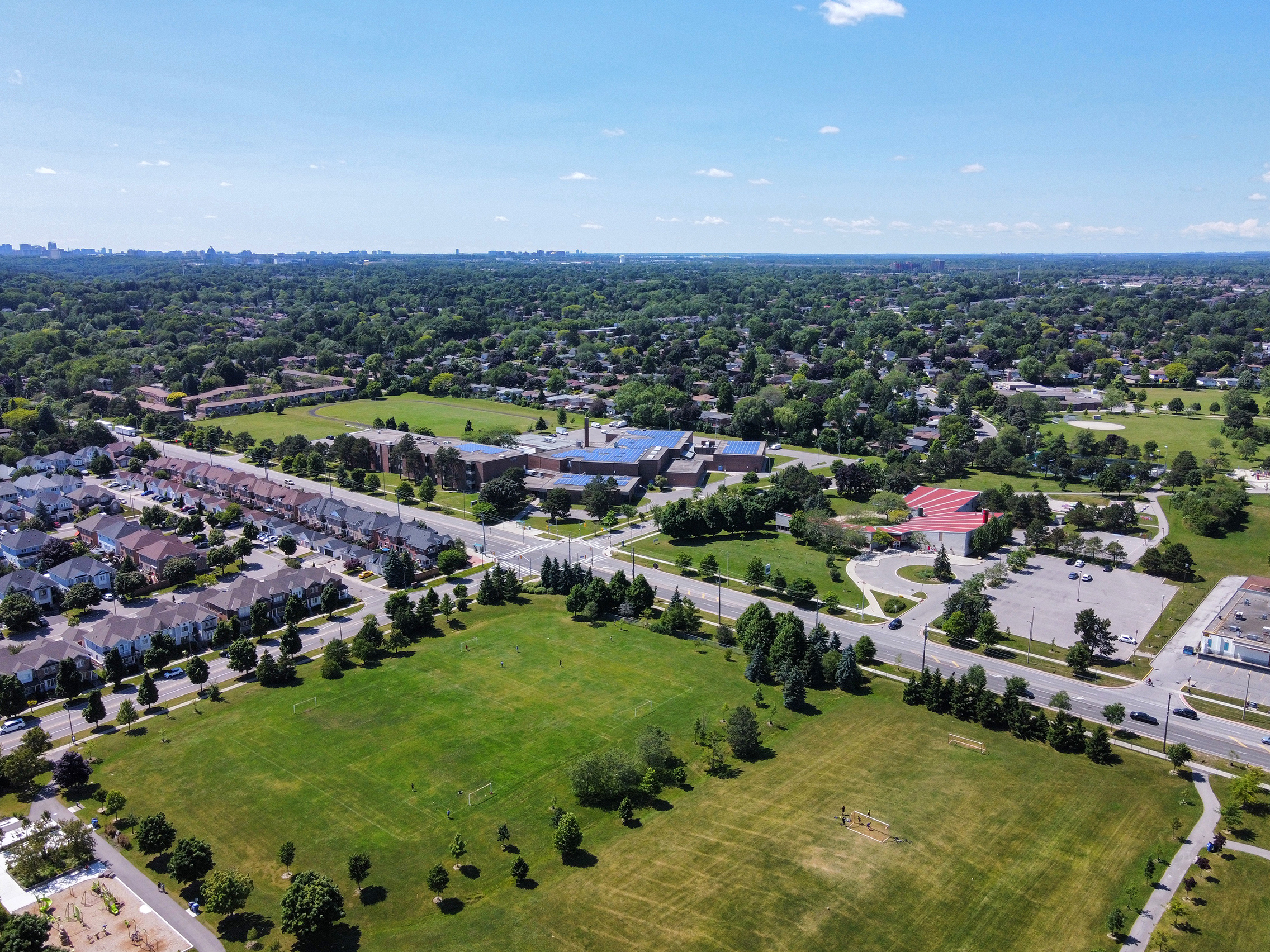
Sir Oliver Mowat Collegiate Institute is a public secondary school located in Port Union.

Three public school boards operate within the neighbourhood of Port Union, the secular Toronto District School Board (TDSB), and the separate Conseil scolaire catholique MonAvenir (CSCM), and the Toronto Catholic District School Board (TCDSB).

TDSB operates three public elementary and secondary schools in the neighbourhood. Elementary schools in Port Union include Centennial Road Junior Public School and Charlottetown Junior Public School. Sir Oliver Mowat Collegiate Institute is a TDSB secondary school established in 1970.

In addition to TDSB, the neighbourhood is also home to elementary schools operated by the CSCM, and TCDSB, two separate school boards. St. Brendan Catholic School is a public elementary school operated by TCDSB, whereas École élémentaire catholique Saint-Michel is a French-language public elementary school operated by CSCM.

== Recreation ==
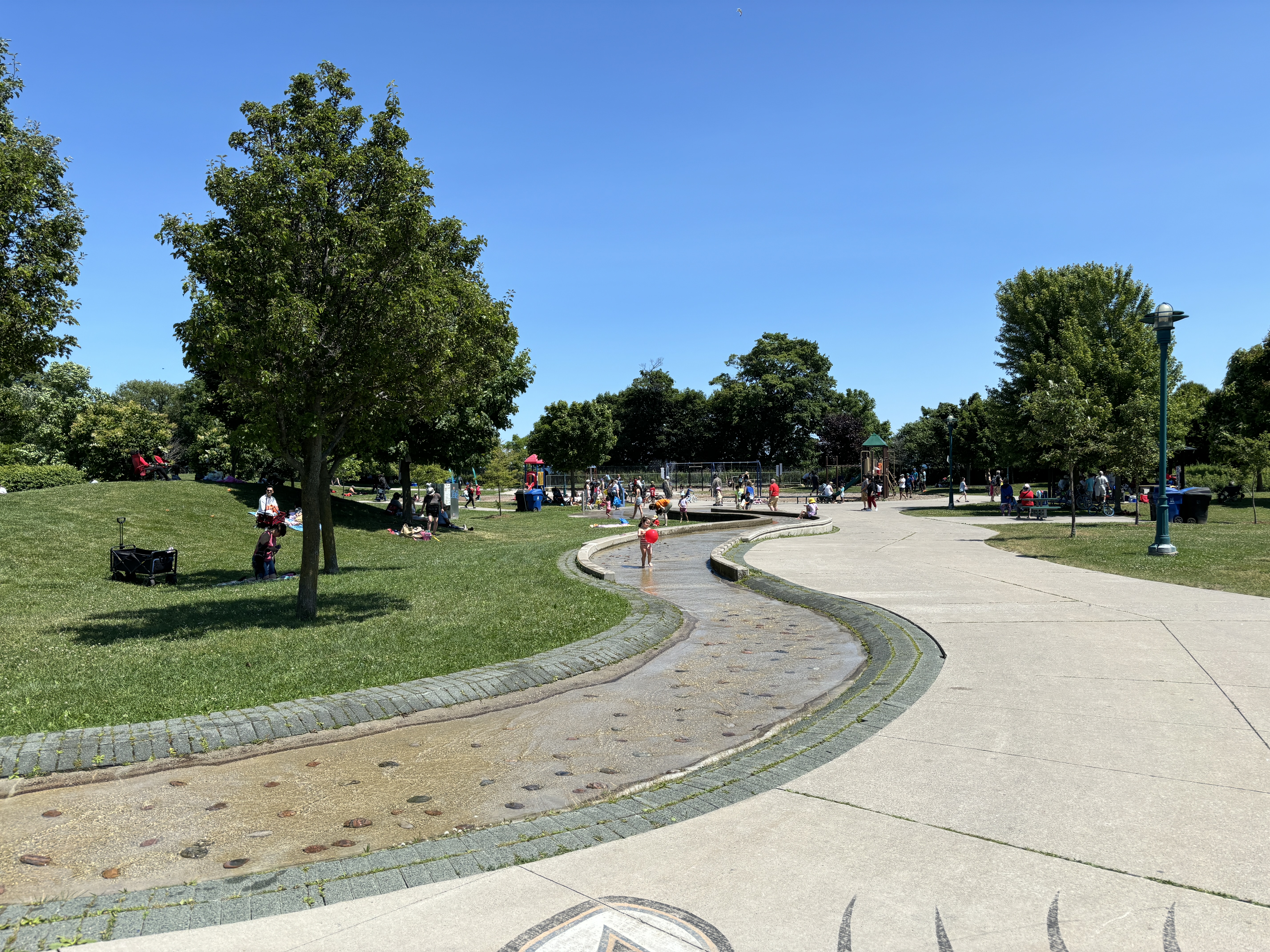
Port Union Village Common Park

Port Union is home to several municipal parks operated by the Toronto Parks, Forestry and Recreation Division. Major parks in the neighbourhood include Adams Park, which is located on Lawson road. It is a very popular park. Adams Park has a toboggan hill in the winter, a soccer field in the summer, and two playgrounds. It also includes two baseball diamonds that are regularly used by neighborhood youth. Centennial Park, a park that contains a grassy area with a children's playground, is located next to the sports fields at Centennial Road Junior Public School at 225 Centennial Road. This should not be confused with the major recreational facility located in the former city of Etobicoke.

== See also ==
- List of neighbourhoods in Toronto
