= Don Landry =

Canadian sports broadcaster

Don Landry (born ca. 1964) is a Canadian sports broadcaster who formerly hosted the Morning Show on The Fan 590 with Pat Marsden and then Gord Stellick.

Landry, along with Stellick, were the brains behind Chacin Cologne. The cologne was named after Toronto Blue Jays pitcher Gustavo Chacín and given out to 10,000 fans on Chacin Cologne Night at Rogers Centre.

Landry is known for his sense of humour and voice impersonations. His impersonations include Jerry Howarth, Don Cherry, and Mike Tyson.

He is also a frequent host of charity dinners and golf events throughout Toronto.

Currently, Landry is a contributing writer for the Canadian Football League's website, as well as a columnist for the Toronto Argonauts' website. As of 2013, Landry also serves as the public address announcer during the Argonauts' home games.

Landry began a radio talk show called "London at Large" on CJBK 1290AM in London, Ontario on September 23, 2013.
