= Jim Hunt (columnist) =

Canadian sports columnist

Jim "Shaky" Hunt (9 November 1926 – 9 March 2006) was a Canadian sports columnist who spent over 50 years as a journalist and covered the biggest events in sports including the Stanley Cup, the Super Bowl, the Olympics, all of golf's majors and the 1972 Canada-Russia Summit Series. Hunt was known as "Shaky" thanks to his intramural goaltending career at the University of Western Ontario, where he was part of the school's first journalism graduating class, in 1948. Jim Hunt was inducted into the Ontario Sports Hall of Fame in 2004.

Hunt died aged 79 after suffering a heart attack. and is remembered as a "character who had a loud and distinctive voice and loved telling good stories". Hunt left Caroline, his wife of 54 years, daughters Kathryn, and Cally, and sons Rod and Andrew. He also left two brothers, Don and Jack, and six grandchildren, Ben, Billy, Cally, Katie, Aiden and Ella.

== Career ==
Born and raised in Sarnia, Ontario, Hunt began his 50-plus years in journalism when he joined the Toronto Daily Star in 1948, working first as a city news reporter. He was working in the Queen's Park bureau before moving to sports in 1952.

At the Star's sports department, he worked under Milt Dunnell in 1953 and later the Star's former weekly magazine as sports editor. While with the Star, one challenging assignment saw him smuggling a gun — he opted for a fake one made of wood — in a gun case into Maple Leaf Gardens in 1956 during a Toronto Maple Leafs playoff game against the Detroit Red Wings. The objective for Hunt was to test the Gardens' security. He was able to get past the ticket-takers and the Star ran the picture of him and the gun case on the front page the next day.

Along the way he interviewed a long list of well-known figures in the sports world and outside it. He wrote a biography in the mid-1960s on hockey legend Bobby Hull. It was titled, Bobby Hull: The first million dollar hockey player. He had lunch with Marilyn Monroe and took notes while chatting with Yankee great Mickey Mantle. He also interviewed legendary boxers, Rocky Marciano, Sonny Liston and Muhammad Ali. As well as sharing drinks with Queen Elizabeth II on her private yacht during the Montreal Olympics.

His interview with Ali took place in a midtown Manhattan hotel room prior to Ali's 1964 upset win over Sonny Liston. After telling Hunt what he was going to do to Liston, the young and brash Ali (then known as Cassius Clay) burst into one of his trademark verses. "After I beat Liston I'll be sad, then there'll be no one to make me mad."

His book also described what it was like covering the hockey riots in 1955 in Montreal. The incident occurred after the NHL suspended Canadiens great Maurice Richard for attacking a Boston Bruins player with his stick, and later going after a linesman who tried to stop him. Hunt said it was a day he'd never forget, "one of the blackest in the history of hockey."

He moved to CKEY in 1967 as sports director of the AM radio station, eventually becoming news director. Hunt credited the CKEY job with giving him the opportunity to cover the 1972 and 1974 Canada-Russia hockey series.

In 1983, he became sports columnist with the Toronto Sun. He would later co-host a sports program with Bob McCown called Prime Time Sports on Toronto's The Fan 590 radio station while with the paper.

== Harold Ballard ==
Jim Hunt had many run-ins with Toronto Maple Leafs owner Harold Ballard. It was Hunt that gave Harold Ballard the nickname Pal Hal, which would be the title of Dick Beddoes biography about Ballard. The first notable incident with Ballard took place as a rebuttal towards Hunt's comments about the Toronto Maple Leafs. Ballard went on the air after the next Maple Leafs game and called Hunt a bastard. He then told TV host Dave Hodge that his comments were about someone whose last name starts with one of the first three letters of the alphabet. Hodge responded by saying Jim Bunt. Ballard responded by saying the name started with the letter C.

When Hunt worked for the Toronto Sun newspaper, Hunt was asked to attend Harold Ballard's 85th birthday. The birthday was on 30 July 1988 and held at Ballard's cottage in Thunder Beach. Hunt attended the party with a female photographer called Veronica Milne. Hunt and Milne got lost on the way to the party and arrived an hour late. Upon their arrival, Ballard responded by saying, "Hunt, I know why you’re late. You were humping her in the back seat of the car."

== Grey Cup ==
Jim attended every Grey Cup game between 1949 and 1999. During the press conference before the start of the Grey Cup, he would ask the head coaches their opinion on players having sex before the championship game. This became an annual tradition. When he couldn't attend the last few Grey Cups, another journalist stood up to pose the question in his absence.

He was inducted into the Canadian Football Hall of Fame in 1987.

== Golf Adventures ==
- One year in the press room at Glen Abbey Golf Course, the golf writer for the New York Times went to the media director and asked for his seat to be moved because "there’s some loudmouth sitting beside me." That was Hunt, who never stopped yapping or laughing.
- One year at The Masters, we were walking past the clubhouse and Arnold Palmer walked past, stopped and said: "Hi Jim." Hunt looked at him and said: "Do I know you?"
- There was another year when Hunt took Masters chairman Jack Stephens to task. At the annual press conference with the heads of Augusta, Shaky said: "You invite Japanese, Spaniards, Frenchmen, Australians but you never invite Canadians. Why is that?" Stephens conferred for a moment with a couple of others and then said: "We consider them North Americans."

== Retirement ==
In 2001, Hunt was honoured by Sports Media Canada, the Canadian arm of the international sportswriters' association, with an achievement award. He also authored the autobiography All Work and All Play: A Life in the Outrageous World of Sports (ISBN 0-470-83552-4) with Steve Simmons a fellow Canadian journalist writing the foreword. Published by Wiley and Sons, it was released on 30 September 2005. It was a collection of stories from his time as a reporter. Long after he'd retired from full-time work he continued writing a Tuesday column for the Sun, his last one running 28 February 2006.
