= Stephen Brunt =

Canadian sports journalist

- Born: March 20, 1959 (age 66); Hamilton, Ontario, Canada
- Occupations: Newspaper Columnist and Sports Broadcaster
- Notable credit(s): The Globe and Mail and Sportsnet
- Stephen Brunt's voice

Stephen Brunt (born March 20, 1959) is a Canadian sports journalist, well known as a former columnist for Sportsnet.ca, Sportsnet, and former co-host on podcasts for Sportsnet.

== Journalist ==
Born in Hamilton, Ontario, Brunt started at The Globe as an arts intern in 1982, after attending journalism school at the University of Western Ontario. He then worked in news, covering the 1984 election, and began to write for the sports section in 1985. His 1988 series on negligence and corruption in boxing won him the Michener Award for public service journalism. In 1989, he became a sports columnist.

== Awards and nominations ==
Nominated for several National Newspaper Awards, Brunt is also the author of seven books. His work Facing Ali, published in 2003, was named one of the ten best sports books of the year by Sports Illustrated. Brunt makes frequent appearances on sports talk radio shows such as Prime Time Sports and Melnick in the Afternoon on the Team 990 in Montreal. He has been the lead sports columnist for The Globe and Mail since 1989 and was a frequent sports panelist on TVOntario's now-defunct current affairs programme Studio 2. He was inducted into the Canadian Football Hall of Fame in 2007.

== Home life ==
He currently resides with his wife, Jeannie, in Hamilton, Ontario, spending much of his summer vacation in Winterhouse Brook, Newfoundland.

== Radio career ==
In 2001, CHUM Radio Network launched an all-sports radio network in major markets across Canada. The flagship station was to be created in Toronto from the previously oldies-format station CP24 Radio 1050. The Team 1050 was launched on May 7, 2001, at 3pm. In an attempt to compete with the existing all-sports radio station in Toronto, the Fan 590, Jim Waters and long-time sports executive Paul Williams (who launched the Fan 590 and The Score Television Network) worked to lure talent away from the competition. Previously unsuccessful at luring Bob McCown (Fan 590's highest rated show) to The Score Television Network, Williams went after his co-host, Stephen Brunt. Williams and Waters were able to attract quality on-air talent including Paul Romanuk for the morning show, and Jim Van Horne and Stephen Brunt for the afternoon drive slot. Van Horne and Brunt represented roughly a $375,000 investment in annual salaries.

The Team 1050 performed poorly out of the gate, garnering just 0.7% of the male 25 to 49 market share (compared to the Fan 590's 4.6% share in the mornings and 6.4% during the afternoon drive show), which made it difficult to attach a cost to advertising or attracting advertisers. Just one year after launch, ratings showed little improvement with a 0.9% share of the male 25 to 49 demographic. Brunt stepped down as co-host in spring 2002 but was still heard regularly on air until the Team 1050 was cancelled and reverted to an oldies station on August 27, 2002, at 3pm.

It took some time before Brunt was brought back into the Fan 590 fold as McCown's co-host and foil. Presumably, McCown was perturbed by Brunt's leaving to compete directly against Primetime Sports on the Team 1050. The two appear to have resolved any past issues and are Canadian radio personalities on-air today.

To this day when the Team or Brunt's leaving the Fan 590 comes up on the radio, Brunt notes that he did it for the nice cheque, something McCown should understand. (Note: Heard on numerous episodes of the Fan 590's Primetime Sports)

On February 22, 2018, it was announced that Brunt is rejoining Primetime Sports as a part-time co-host for 20 weeks a year.

On September 9, 2022, Stephen Brunt announced he was departing Sportsnet and Primetime Sports.

== Author ==
Stephen Brunt has authored several successful books including Facing Ali: 15 Fighters / 15 Stories (2003) (which details some of the professional boxing bouts of boxer Muhammad Ali), Gretzky's Tears: Hockey, America and the Day Everything Changed (2009) (which details the August 9, 1988, trade of centreman Wayne Gretzky to the Los Angeles Kings), and the #1 Canadian best seller Searching for Bobby Orr (2006) (which is a biography of defenseman Bobby Orr).

His other works include The Way it Looks from Here: Contemporary Canadian Writing on Sports; Mean Business: The Rise and Fall of Shawn O'Sullivan; Second to None: The Roberto Alomar Story (which he famously wrote in a single month) and Diamond Dreams: 20 Years of Blue Jays Baseball, as well as the script for Joseph Blasioli's 2003 documentary film The Last Round: Chuvalo vs. Ali.

Brunt co-founded The Writers at Woody Point, which is a literary festival that takes place annually in Woody Point, Bonne Bay, Newfoundland, in 2004. He has served as the artistic director since that time.

Brunt mentioned on Prime Time Sports during the fall of 2013, when talking about fighting's place in hockey, that he was working on a book with NHL player Jordin Tootoo. The book was published on October 21, 2014, entitled All The Way: My Life on Ice.

In October 2020, Stephen Brunt published a book written with executive director of the Professional Women's Hockey League Player's Association (PWHLPA), former NHL GM and media personality Brian Burke entitled "Burke's Law: A Life in Hockey".

== 2010 Vancouver Winter Olympics ==
=== Torch relay controversy ===
As the CTV-Rogers Olympic consortium won the broadcast rights to the 2010 Winter Olympics, Stephen Brunt became a central journalist leading up to and during the games. A minor controversy arose when it was announced that Brunt would be carrying the Olympic torch in Newfoundland. Brunt was initially singled out by the Toronto Sun and by the Toronto Star as being unethical as a journalist for carrying the torch. When confronted by the question of integrity and ethics of the relay on Primetime Sports, the conversation unfolded as follows:

Brunt: "This is a commercial endeavor. The torch relay, God love it, which is going to make people tear up and is a lovely thing, and a way of including people in the Olympic process, is sponsored. And it is corporate and underwritten. And spots were sold as part of the sponsorship package... This is all part of the machinery of the Olympic Games."

"You don't see an ethics problem?" asked Bob McCown.
"No," Brunt said, "because nobody is telling me what to say or what to do."

The issue quickly subsided as it became clear that a wide variety of people were to carry the torch, including 25 other journalists from the Olympic Consortium.

=== Video essay: What these Games mean to Canada ===
Stephen Brunt worked throughout the Olympics writing stories, doing sports radio, and enjoying the games. His work culminated in a video essay which he wrote and performed the voiceover for, which aired just after Canada won Gold in Men's Hockey. The piece was entitled What these Games mean to Canada and summed up the Canadian experience during the Olympics.
