= Kevin Barker =

American baseball player (born 1975)

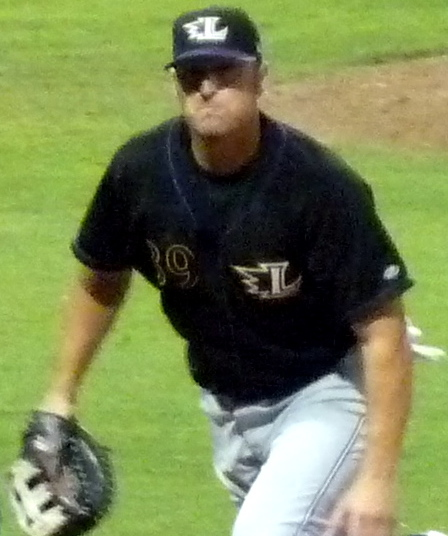
- Barker with the Louisville Bats in 2009
- First baseman
- Born: July 26, 1975 (age 50); Bristol, Virginia, U.S.
- Batted: Left Threw: Left

MLB debut
- September 19, 1999, for the Milwaukee Brewers

Last MLB appearance
- October 4, 2009, for the Cincinnati Reds

MLB statistics
- Batting average: .249
- Home runs: 6
- Runs batted in: 36
- Stats at Baseball Reference

Teams
- Milwaukee Brewers (1999–2000); San Diego Padres (2002); Toronto Blue Jays (2006); Cincinnati Reds (2009)

Kevin Stewart Barker (born on July 26, 1975) is an American baseball analyst and former professional baseball player. In his career, he played in Major League Baseball (MLB) as a first baseman for the Milwaukee Brewers, San Diego Padres, Toronto Blue Jays, and Cincinnati Reds. He currently co-hosts the sports talk show Blair and Barker alongside Jeff Blair on Sportsnet 590 the FAN radio and on multiple Sportsnet TV channels, out of Toronto. He began co-hosting Blair and Barker after Sportsnet parted ways with Gregg Zaun.

== Playing career ==
Barker is from the small community of Mendota in Washington County, Virginia. He played for three years at John S. Battle High School, before transferring to Virginia High School in Bristol, Virginia as a senior in 1993.

Barker attended Virginia Polytechnic Institute and State University, where he played college baseball for the Virginia Tech Hokies. The Milwaukee Brewers selected Barker in the third round of the 1996 MLB draft. He made his major league debut on August 19, 1999, with the Brewers. He went 2 for 5 in his debut, with his first hit a single to right field off Chris Holt of the Astros. He hit his first home run on September 5, 1999, off of Larry Luebbers of the Cardinals. Though the Brewers hoped that Barker would be their long-term first baseman, he was soon surpassed by Richie Sexson. He played in a total of 78 games with the Brewers in 1999 and 2000 and hit .253.

After spending the 2001 season in the minors, the Brewers traded him to the San Diego Padres on March 24, 2002, in exchange for Dusty Wathan. He appeared in only 7 games for the Padres and spent most of the season in AAA with the Portland Beavers.

He spent 2003–2006 in the minor league systems of the Florida Marlins, Philadelphia Phillies and Toronto Blue Jays and was named the International League player of the week in 2006 while playing with the Syracuse SkyChiefs.

He received a September call-up with the Blue Jays and on September 3, 2006, Barker recorded his first hit as a Blue Jay, a home run off Boston Red Sox starting pitcher Josh Beckett. After the 2007 season, Barker signed a minor league contract with the Cincinnati Reds and played for the Triple-A Louisville Bats the entire year. In 2009, he appeared in 29 games for the Reds, batting .281.

He spent the 2010 and 2011 seasons in the Mexican League.

On September 19, 2025, Kevin was inducted into the Virginia Tech Hall of Fame as part of the Class of 2025.

Barker currently co-hosts the sports talk show Blair and Barker alongside Jeff Blair on Toronto radio station Sportsnet 590 the FAN and on multiple Sportsnet TV channels.

== Personal life ==
Barker is married to Hazel Mae of Sportsnet.
