= Prime Time Sports =

Sports radio talk show

Prime Time Sports was a sports radio talk show produced from the studios of CJCL, Sportsnet 590 The Fan, in Toronto, Ontario, Canada. The show was hosted by Bob McCown until June 21, 2019, when McCown left the show. After his departure, the show was hosted by Jeff Blair, with Stephen Brunt or Richard Deitsch serving as co-hosts until its final show on October 11, 2019.

The program was simulcast on CJCL's sister cable networks Sportsnet, Sportsnet One and Sportsnet 360.

== History ==
The show was first broadcast on October 2, 1989, as a syndicated sports radio talk show from 6:10 pm – 7:00 pm EST with Bob McCown as the host and Bill Watters as co-host. Newspaper columnist Jim Hunt later became co-host of the program, after Watters left to become assistant general manager of the Toronto Maple Leafs. When CJCL changed their format to all-sports radio in 1992, Prime Time Sports became the station's afternoon drive show, while also being syndicated nationwide. In 1993, McCown was reassigned as the station's new morning show host, and Dan Shulman became the program's host in his place. Hunt continued on in his role as co-host. In 1995, Shulman left the station to join TSN, and McCown was re-united with Hunt. Hunt was co-host until 2000 when he was let go by the station. In 2004, Rogers Sportsnet began simulcasting the show on television. In 2005, the program began making the 6:00 p.m. to 7:00 p.m. audio content available as a podcast and streaming audio on The FAN 590's website. By 2009, all three hours of the show were available as a podcast. In 2009, the show was available on the "East" regional feed only. In July 2010, the show's live broadcast hours were changed from 4:00–7:00 p.m.

Howard Berger was the first producer of Prime Time Sports. Chris Clarke took over one year later and produced the show for eight years. However, Ryan Walsh is the longest tenured producer of Prime Time Sports, spanning over a decade with McCown. Others who produced the show include Matt Marchese, Mike Gentile, Greg Sansone, Mike Damergis, Jeff Azzopardi and Mark Boffo.

Since 2009, the co-hosting duties were usually provided on a weekly basis by either Stephen Brunt from The Globe and Mail newspaper or John Shannon, formerly the executive vice-president of programming and production for the NHL . A past co-host who still appeared regularly on the show was Doug Smith of the Toronto Star. Former co-host Jim Kelley of Sportsnet.ca and SI.com is now deceased.

In February 2011, McCown was reunited with Damien Cox of the Toronto Star; sharing co-hosting duties with Stephen Brunt. Later in April, the show's broadcast hours were changed back from 3:00 - 6:00 p.m, to 4:00 - 7:00 p.m.

In February 2018, Richard Deitsch joined PTS, accompanying Brunt as co-hosts of PTS with McCown.

McCown's last PTS show was broadcast on June 21, 2019. Prior to the broadcast, it was speculated that he would be retiring; however, on the day before its broadcast, he posted this message on Twitter, "Okay - I am leaving Prime Time Sports and Rogers. But nobody can shut me up when I still have things to say. Stay tuned. "I'll be back!". After McCown's last broadcast of PTS, the show was hosted by Jeff Blair, along with co-hosts Stephen Brunt or Richard Deitsch. In September 2019, Sportsnet announced that Prime Time Sports would be replaced by a radio simulcast of the Sportsnet show Tim & Sid starting October 14. The final episode of Prime Time Sports aired on October 11, 2019, and with the end of Prime Time Sports, Blair, Brunt and Deitsch moved to a mid-afternoon time slot with the debut of Writers Bloc.

"Speed Demons", an instrumental piece of music by Simon Holland, served as the program's theme for a majority of its run.

== Format ==
Between Monday and Thursday, McCown and his co-host conducted interviews with people making the sports news, and discussed sports issues with several analysts such as former host Shulman, Peter King (Sports Illustrated), and Nick Kypreos (formerly of Sportsnet). Among McCown's regular guest callers were boxing writer Bert Randolph Sugar and former football star Jim Brown, who played for McCown's hometown Cleveland Browns.

On Fridays, McCown was joined in studio by that week's co-host and two additional guests for "The Friday Roundtable". This is more in-depth, free-form discussion about the week's sports news and issues.

When McCown was unable to host the program, Jeff Blair and Elliotte Friedman served as fill-in hosts.

The show changed its timeslot in July 2010 from the traditional 4–7 slot to a 3–6 slot. This was a bit of a surprising move as Prime Time Sports' early ratings from 2010 were the best in the shows history, a 9.2 up from a 7.2. It changed back with the debut of the show Tim & Sid in 2011, which would later transition from a radio sports talk show to a television sports talk show on Sportsnet in 2015.

== See also ==
- Pratt & Taylor, a similar show broadcast from the studios of The Team 1040 in Vancouver and simulcast on Rogers Sportsnet
