= Tim & Friends =

- Starring: Tim Micallef (2011-2023); Sid Seixeiro (2011-2021); Jesse Rubinoff (2021-2023)
- Country of origin: Canada

Production
- Running time: 180 minutes (2011-2015); 90-120 minutes (2015-2023)
- Production company: Rogers Sports & Media

Original release
- Network: (non-televised) (2011-2013); The Score/Sportsnet 360 (2013-2015, 2019-2023); Sportsnet (2015-2023)
- Release: December 12, 2011 – April 11, 2023

Tim & Friends (originally Tim & Sid) is a sports talk show hosted by Tim Micallef that was produced by the Canadian sports television network Sportsnet where it aired. The program, originally known as Tim & Sid and hosted by Micallef and Sid Seixeiro, was established in 2011 as an afternoon radio show on CJCL. The program gained a television simulcast on The Score (now Sportsnet 360) in 2013. On July 1, 2015, the program was re-launched on Sportsnet as a dedicated television program. On October 14, 2019, the Tim & Sid telecasts began simulcasting on CJCL, replacing Prime Time Sports as its late afternoon drive program. Seixeiro left the show in 2021, and the show was rebranded as Tim & Friends. During the summer of 2021, Tim & Friends stopped being simulcasted on CJCL and again became a dedicated television program. Tim & Friends concluded its run in 2023.

== History ==
The program was launched as Tim & Sid in 2011 as an afternoon radio show on CJCL, a sports talk radio station owned by Rogers Media in Toronto. The program began to be simulcast by Micallef and Seixeiro's previous home, The Score in May 2013, coinciding with the Canadian Radio-television and Telecommunications Commission's (CRTC) approval of Rogers' acquisition of the network (since renamed Sportsnet 360). Tim & Sid became known for the pair's freeform style, and proved popular among a younger audience and a loyal group of fans. The program gained further attention from viral videos during the 2014 Winter Olympics, such as their live reaction to Canada's winning goal in the gold medal game of the Women's hockey tournament.

On January 20, 2015, Rogers announced major changes to CJCL's lineup, including the replacement of Tim & Sid with Greg Brady and Andrew Walker as its new afternoon show. Concurrently, Sportsnet announced that Tim & Sid would be relaunched as a television show on July 1, 2015. Sportsnet president Scott Moore likened Tim & Sid to being a "sports content factory" operating across multiple platforms (including television and social media), and explained that Micallef and Seixeiro "are not just highlight guys, they know how to engage on any sports topic and the great thing about these guys is they can connect with sports fans on any number of levels." The program aired weeknights from 5 to 7 p.m. ET, though the program was frequently shortened to 90 minutes to allow for pre-game coverage of Toronto Blue Jays and National Hockey League (NHL) games. When neither Tim nor Sid were able to host, Donnovan Bennett, Faizal Khamisa, Alex Seixeiro, Arash Madani, or Danielle Michaud would serve as substitute hosts.

In 2019, when the Toronto Raptors won their first NBA championship, Micallef and Seixeiro co-hosted Rogers coverage on Sportsnet and Citytv of the championship parade alongside Breakfast Television Toronto’s Dina Pugliese.

On September 25, 2019, it was announced that a simulcast of the program would air on CJCL beginning October 14, replacing Prime Time Sports. The program was simulcasted on CJCL until July 2021.

Tim & Sid logo

=== Departure of Sid Seixeiro ===
On January 21, 2021, Seixeiro announced that he would leave Tim & Sid, and join Breakfast Television as its new co-host beginning March 10. It was also announced that Tim would continue to host the program with guest hosts. Seixeiro's final show as regular co-host aired on February 26, 2021.

The show resumed on March 8, rebranded as Tim & Friends. Seixeiro's first appearance since his departure was on the June 1, 2021 edition as a guest by phone reacting to the Toronto Maple Leafs losing their first round series against the Montreal Canadiens in the 2021 Stanley Cup Playoffs.

=== Guests and Guest Hosts ===
In-studio guests and guest hosts on the show over the years have included:

- Steve "Dangle" Glynn, host of Leafs Fan Reaction and The Steve Dangle Podcast as well as Sportsnet's Steve's Dang-Its and Steve's Hat-Picks, who stood in for Micallef on the November 22nd, 2018 edition
- Jack Edwards, Boston Bruins play-by-play commentator for NESN and former ESPN commentator and SportsCenter anchor

=== Cancellation ===
On March 27, 2023, Micallef announced that April 11 would be the show's final episode, as he would be moving on to host the weeknight/morning edition of Sportsnet Central, beginning at the start of the 2023 Stanley Cup playoffs.

== Ratings ==
During its first month re-launched as a dedicated television program, the show grew Sportsnet's audience by 19% in the 5 to 7 p.m. ET timeslot year-over-year. In its second full month on the air, the show experienced an 18% increase in viewership and became the most-watched sports program in the country during the 6–7 p.m. ET timeslot (beating TSN's SportsCentre). On September 22, 2015, The Globe and Mail reported that the show was attracting more than 100,000 viewers. Two months later, it was reported that Tim & Sid was outpacing TSN's Off the Record (which had recently been cancelled as a part of cuts by the network) as the most-watched sports program in Canada between the 5 p.m. and 7 p.m. hours.
