= Scarborough—Guildwood—Rouge Park =

Federal electoral district in Ontario, Canada

Ontario electoral district
- Interactive map of riding boundaries from the 2025 federal election
- District created: 2023
- First contested: 2025

Demographics
- Population (2021): 114,100
- Electors (2025): 82,641
- Census division: Toronto
- Census subdivision: Toronto (part)

Scarborough—Guildwood—Rouge Park is a federal electoral district in Ontario, Canada. It came into effect upon the call of the 2025 Canadian federal election.

== Geography ==
Under the 2022 Canadian federal electoral redistribution the riding will largely replace Scarborough—Rouge Park.

- Loses all of its territory west of Morningside Avenue (Malvern) to Scarborough North
- Gains the neighbourhoods of Morningside, Guildwood and the remainder of West Hill from Scarborough-Guildwood, with a small piece of Guildwood coming from Scarborough Southwest

== Demographics ==
According to the 2021 Canadian census

Languages: 63.0% English, 8.4% Tamil, 4.0% Tagalog, 2.4% Bengali, 1.8% Urdu, 1.5% French, 1.4% Cantonese, 1.3% Mandarin, 1.2% Punjabi, 1.1% Gujarati

Religions: 49.7% Christian (22.7% Catholic, 3.1% Anglican, 2.8% Christian Orthodox, 2.4% Pentecostal, 1.7% United Church, 1.3% Presbyterian, 1.2% Baptist, 14.4% Other), 18.9% No religion, 16.4% Hindu, 12.0% Muslim, 1.1% Sikh, 1.1% Buddhist

Median income: $37,600 (2020)

Average income: $48,800 (2020)

Panethnic groups in Scarborough—Guildwood—Rouge Park (2021)
| Panethnic group | 2021 | |
| Panethnic group | Pop. | % |
|---|---|---|
| South Asian | 35,545 | 31.36% |
| European (Note: Statistic includes all persons that did not make up part of a visible minority or an indigenous identity.) | 32,020 | 28.25% |
| African | 17,455 | 15.4% |
| Southeast Asian (Note: Statistic includes total responses of "Filipino" and "Southeast Asian" under visible minority section on census.) | 10,395 | 9.17% |
| East Asian (Note: Statistic includes total responses of "Chinese", "Korean", and "Japanese" under visible minority section on census.) | 5,565 | 4.91% |
| Middle Eastern (Note: Statistic includes total responses of "West Asian" and "Arab" under visible minority section on census.) | 2,895 | 2.55% |
| Latin American | 1,700 | 1.5% |
| Indigenous | 1,050 | 0.93% |
| Other/multiracial (Note: Statistic includes total responses of "Visible minority, n.i.e." and "Multiple visible minorities" under visible minority section on census.) | 6,735 | 5.94% |
| Total responses | 113,350 | 99.21% |
| Total population | 114,250 | 100% |
Notes: Totals greater than 100% due to multiple origin responses. Demographics based on 2022 Canadian federal electoral redistribution riding boundaries.

== History ==
| Parliament | Years | Member | Party |
|---|---|---|---|
Scarborough—Guildwood—Rouge Park; Riding created from Scarborough—Guildwood, Scarborough—Rouge Park, and Scarborough Southwest
| 45th | 2025–present | Gary Anandasangaree | Liberal |

== Election results ==
2025 Canadian federal election
** Preliminary results — Not yet official **
| Party | Candidate | Votes | % | ±% | Expenditures |
|---|---|---|---|---|---|
| Liberal | Gary Anandasangaree | 35,343 | 63.94 | +2.66 | |
| Conservative | Suchita Jalan | 17,529 | 31.71 | +9.64 | |
| New Democratic | Kingsley Kwok | 1,770 | 3.20 | –10.18 | |
| Green | Troy Rife | 635 | 1.15 | N/A | |
| Total valid votes/expense limit | | | | | |
| Total rejected ballots | | | | | |
| Turnout | | 55,277 | 65.89 | | |
| Eligible voters | | 83,894 | | | |
| Liberal notional hold | | Swing | | –3.49 | |
Source: Elections Canada

2021 federal election redistributed results
| Party | Vote | % |
|---|---|---|
| Liberal | 30,753 | 61.28 |
| Conservative | 11,074 | 22.07 |
| New Democratic | 6,713 | 13.38 |
| People's | 1,511 | 3.01 |
| Others | 131 | 0.26 |

== See also ==
- List of Canadian electoral districts
