= Richard Deitsch =

American sportswriter

Richard Deitsch is an American sportswriter. He wrote for Sports Illustrated from 1997 until 2018. He wrote for the online publication The Athletic until 2025 and is a radio host in Toronto. He joined Sports Business Journal in 2026 as a special contributor.

Deitsch graduated with a B.A. in communications and political science from the University at Buffalo. While studying there, he worked on the school's student newspaper, The Spectrum, which fostered in him a love of journalism. This led him to obtain an M.S. from the Columbia University Graduate School of Journalism, where he would later become an adjunct professor.

He began his career in 1997 at Sports Illustrated, fulfilling a childhood aspiration sparked by his mother giving him a subscription to the magazine as a 7-year-old growing up in Wantagh, New York. Beginning as an intern at Sports Illustrated Kids, Deitsch went on to cover nearly every division at Sports Illustrated.

During the 2008-09 academic year, he was at the University of Michigan, studying as a Knight-Wallace Fellow. While there, he examined the intersection of 20-somethings and the sports blogosphere.

On February 22, 2018, it was announced that Deitsch would join CJCL, Sportsnet 590 The Fan, as a regular co-host for its drive-time show Prime Time Sports, beginning the week of March 5. He remained in that role until Prime Time Sports ended in October 2019, before moving on to the newly created afternoon show Writers Bloc.

Deitsch has a particular interest in sports media, a beat that he launched at Sports Illustrated and continued to cover at The Athletic. It is also the subject of his weekly podcast, Sports Media with Richard Deitsch, launched March 30, 2018.
