= Bob McCown =

American-Canadian radio personality

- Born: Columbus, Ohio, United States
- Other name: The Bobcat
- Occupation: Host of Prime Time Sports

Robert Alan McCown (born 1952) is an American-Canadian radio personality. He is best known as the long-time host of the Canadian sports talk show Prime Time Sports from its inception on October 2, 1989, to June 21, 2019. From July 2020 to November 2024, he hosted his own podcast, The Bob McCown podcast.

== Career ==
McCown made his broadcast debut in 1975 as host of a nightly sports talk show on Foster Hewitt's CKFH, where he had been working in its sales department since being hired the previous year. He would add to his resume in 1977, assuming adjunct employment as the public address announcer at Toronto Blue Jays' home games during their inaugural season. In 1981, Telemedia purchased CKFH, rebranded it as CJCL, and switched to an adult contemporary format. McCown left that same year for Global TV in Toronto where in November 1981 he would launch and anchor Sportsline, before moving on later in the decade to host TSN's The Business of Sports.

As the 1980s progressed, as it became ever more popular, CJCL began devoting more time to sports talk programming. This culminated in the launch of Prime Time Sports, for which McCown was brought back to host, in 1988 Although the pilot episode aired on October 2, 1989, it was actually taped a year earlier in a bar in Etobicoke, and focused on Ben Johnson's positive test for steroids at that year's Seoul Olympics. CJCL completed its format change on September 4, 1992, when it rebranded as "The Fan 1430" and became Canada's first all-sports radio station. McCown was subsequently given his own morning program, The Bob McCown Show, while Dan Shulman took over as anchor of PTS.

1995 turned out to be one of the most tumultuous in McCown's career as he was fired only to be re-hired a month later to once again host PTS after Shulman left to become the Blue Jays' play-by-play announcer on TSN. McCown promptly took a 3-week vacation after hosting just one show upon his return on a Friday afternoon. For the rest of the decade, he would host PTS at times during winter from his Las Vegas home while simultaneously smoking and spending commercial breaks on his couch. Rogers Media purchased The Fan in 2002, and, two years later, began simulcasting PTS on Rogers Sportsnet, thereby allowing McCown to also become a fixture on television for the first time in his career. In 2007, McCown received a Sports Radio Award for "Air Talent Of The Year" at the Rick Scott & Associates Sports Radio Conference and published his first book, "McCown's Law: The 100 Greatest Hockey Arguments," with co-author David Naylor.

McCown launched fadoo.com in March 2009 with the goal to "provide a platform for dialogue and comment among people of power and influence in the sports world. And then, let everyone in on the conversation." The website lasted just over a year before being removed in early June 2010. "It just didn't make business sense, anymore," a source close the operation wrote in an e-mail message. It appeared McCown lost interest in the fadoo.ca site months ago with no posts, updates, or otherwise.

In February 2012, he founded the similarly named Fadoo Productions Inc., a "multi-platform media company" focusing on "documentary and series production". It has produced several shows and series for television including "On The Edge", "Making History" and "Touch'em all Joe".

In June 2013, McCown purchased Stoney Ridge Estate Winery, one of the oldest and most decorated wineries in the Niagara region. He also acquired a minority (15%) interest that year in Mike Weir Wines in Beamsville, Ontario, before buying full control in 2017. Mike Weir Wines was placed in receivership, owing $6.5 million ($2.2 to Weir and $4.3 to the Royal Bank of Canada), in February 2019.

McCown has also been known for his 30-year standing bet with former Toronto Blue Jays president and CEO Paul Godfrey regarding an NFL team in Toronto. It was on a beach in the year of 1977 that the two men debated long hours about the subject. Godfrey to this day asserts that there will one day be an NFL team in Toronto, while McCown guarantees that there will not. Once a year or every so often, the debate is brought up again.

McCown's last PTS show was broadcast on June 21, 2019. Prior to the broadcast, it was speculated that he would be retiring; however, on the day before its broadcast, he tweeted "Okay - I am leaving Prime Time Sports and Rogers. But nobody can shut me up when I still have things to say. Stay tuned. I'll be back!" The Canadian Press reports that it is currently unknown if he chose to leave or was forced out, but McCown had just signed a multi-year contract extension in December 2017.

On July 10, 2020, McCown began a series of sports talk podcasts on his YouTube channel that would later be branded as "The Bob McCown Show" featuring himself, his featured co-host John Shannon, and a guest or two from the sports industry to discuss sports topics of the day, similar to his former show Prime Time Sports. From March 2021, his podcasts were briefly broadcast on radio station Sauga 960 AM in Mississauga, Ontario weekdays from 6-7 p.m., but have been moved to SiriusXM's station Canada Talks since September 13, 2021. In October 2022, McCown became a brand ambassador for online sportsbook BetRivers. In early December 2024, McCown announced the termination of his podcast.

== Personal life ==
McCown is known for his nickname, The Bobcat. It was given to him by Bill Watters in the 1980s who had originally called him Mercury Bobcat, after the popular 1970s subcompact car.

McCown has maintained his residence between both Las Vegas and Toronto during the mid-1990s, though he has settled in Toronto over the past few years. Though born in the United States (his father Robert served in the USAF and stationed in Columbus, Ohio), he also grew up in Scarborough, Ontario as a child, playing house league in the Dorset Park neighbourhood and went to Winston Churchill Collegiate Institute with former Toronto Star reporter Dave Perkins.

In June 2023, McCown announced that he had been hospitalized after suffering two strokes. In mid-July, he tweeted that he was out of the hospital and recovering and that he would eventually be back to doing his podcast.
