= Scarborough—Guildwood (federal electoral district) =

Federal electoral district in Ontario, Canada

Ontario electoral district
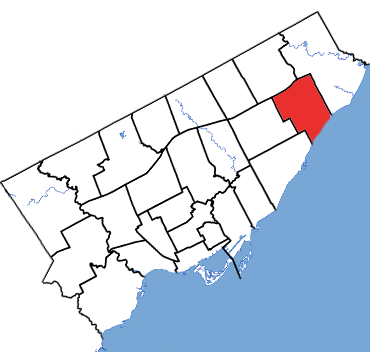
- Scarborough—Guildwood in relation to the other Toronto ridings (2013 boundaries)
- Coordinates: 43.763°N 79.207°W

Federal electoral district
- Legislature: House of Commons
- District created: 2003
- District abolished: 2023
- First contested: 2004
- Last contested: 2021
- District webpage: profile, map

Demographics
- Population (2021): 103,449
- Electors (2015): 63,296
- Area (km²): 27
- Census division: Toronto
- Census subdivision: Toronto

Scarborough—Guildwood is a former federal electoral district in Toronto, Ontario, Canada, that was represented in the House of Commons of Canada from 2004 to 2025.

It was created in 2003 from parts of Scarborough East, Scarborough Southwest and Scarborough Centre.

This riding lost territory to Scarborough—Rouge Park and Scarborough Southwest, and gained territory from Scarborough Centre during the 2012 electoral redistribution.

== Geography ==
It is centred on the Guildwood neighbourhood. It consists of the part of the City of Toronto bounded by a line drawn from Lake Ontario north along Markham Road, west along Eglinton Avenue, north along Bellamy Road South, west along Lawrence Avenue, north along McCowan Road, east along Highway 401, south along Morningside Avenue back to Lake Ontario.

Presently, it contains the neighbourhoods of Guildwood, West Hill (west of Morningside Avenue), Morningside, Woburn, and Scarborough Village (east of Markham Road).

== Demographics ==
According to the 2021 Canadian census

Ethnic groups: 36.2% South Asian, 22.2% White, 15.2% Black, 8.8% Filipino, 4.7% Chinese, 2.6% West Asian, 1.5% Latin American, 1.4% Indigenous, 1.3% Arab, 1.0% Southeast Asian
Languages: 47.4% English, 6.8% Tamil, 5.2% Gujarati, 4.5% Tagalog, 3.0% Bengali, 2.9% Urdu, 1.7% Mandarin, 1.7% Cantonese, 1.4% Hindi, 1.3% Spanish, 1.3% Malayalam, 1.2% Dari, 1.1% Arabic, 1.1% Spanish, 1.0% Punjabi
Religions: 44.7% Christian (20.1% Catholic, 3.0% Christian Orthodox, 2.5% Anglican, 2.2% Pentecostal, 1.4% United Church, 1.2% Baptist, 14.3% Other), 18.5% Muslim, 17.5% Hindu, 1.0% Buddhist, 16.7% None
Median income: $33,200 (2020)

Average income: $41,760 (2020)

== Members of Parliament ==
This riding has elected the following members of the House of Commons of Canada:

Parliament	Years	Member	Party
Scarborough—Guildwood; Riding created from Scarborough East, Scarborough Southwest and Scarborough Centre
38th	2004–2006	John McKay	Liberal
39th	2006–2008	John McKay	Liberal
40th	2008–2011	John McKay	Liberal
41st	2011–2015	John McKay	Liberal
42nd	2015–2019	John McKay	Liberal
43rd	2019–2021	John McKay	Liberal
44th	2021–2025	John McKay	Liberal
Riding dissolved into Scarborough—Guildwood—Rouge Park, Scarborough Southwest, and Scarborough—Woburn

== Election results ==
View source data.
Graph of election results in Scarborough—Guildwood since 2004 (parties that never received at least 2% of the vote are omitted)

2021 Canadian federal election
Party	Candidate	Votes	%	±%	Expenditures
Liberal	John McKay	22,944	61.1	±0.0	$35,483.55
Conservative	Carmen Wilson	7,998	21.3	-1.1	$13,959.11
New Democratic	Michelle Spencer	5,091	13.6	+2.4	$3,318.16
People's	James Bountrogiannis	1,096	2.9	+1.4	$2,840.02
Independent	Kevin Clarke	155	0.4	+0.1	none listed
Centrist	Aslam Khan	129	0.3	N/A	$3,888.19
Independent	Opa Day	85	0.2	N/A	$2,840.02
Canadian Nationalist	Gus Stefanis	52	0.1	-0.1	$0.00
Total valid votes/expense limit		37,550	98.6	–	$104,850.02
Total rejected ballots		548	1.4		
Turnout		38,098	58.0		
Eligible voters		65,711			
Liberal hold		Swing		+0.6	
Source: Elections Canada

2019 Canadian federal election
Party	Candidate	Votes	%	±%	Expenditures
Liberal	John McKay	26,123	61.12	+1.08	$79,793.87
Conservative	Quintus Thuraisingham	9,553	22.35	-4.15	$57,402.46
New Democratic	Michelle Spencer	4,806	11.24	-0.02	none listed
Green	Tara McMahon	1,220	2.85	+1.41	none listed
People's	Jigna Jani	648	1.52	-	none listed
Independent	Kevin Clarke	112	0.26	-0.16	none listed
Canadian Nationalist	Gus Stefanis	85	0.20	–	none listed
Independent	Stephen Abara	70	0.16	-	none listed
Independent	Kathleen Marie Holding	70	0.16	-	none listed
Canada's Fourth Front	Farhan Alvi	55	0.13	-	$791.00
Total valid votes/expense limit		42,742	98.66		
Total rejected ballots		580	1.34	+0.87	
Turnout		43,322	62.89	-1.69	
Eligible voters		68,886			
Liberal hold		Swing		+2.61	
Source: Elections Canada

2015 Canadian federal election
Party	Candidate	Votes	%	±%	Expenditures
Liberal	John McKay	25,167	60.04	+24.25	$77,572.69
Conservative	Chuck Konkel	11,108	26.50	-8.19	$80,342.41
New Democratic	Laura Casselman	4,720	11.26	-15.44	$14,956.71
Green	Kathleen Holding	606	1.45	-0.78	–
Independent	Kevin Clarke	175	0.42	–	–
Marijuana	Paul Coulbeck	141	0.34	-0.26	–
Total valid votes/Expense limit		41,917	99.53		$198,726.79
Total rejected ballots		198	0.47		
Turnout		42,115	64.58		
Eligible voters		65,217			
Liberal hold		Swing		+16.22	
Source: Elections Canada

2011 federal election redistributed results
Party	Vote	%
Liberal	12,380	35.79
Conservative	11,999	34.69
New Democratic	9,237	26.70
Green	769	2.22
Others	206	0.60

2011 Canadian federal election
Party	Candidate	Votes	%	±%	Expenditures
Liberal	John McKay	13,849	36.20	-13.97	
Conservative	Chuck Konkel	13,158	34.39	+4.23	
New Democratic	Danielle Ouellette	10,145	26.52	+12.15	
Green	Alonzo Bartley	848	2.22	-3.09	
Independent	Paul Coulbeck	259	0.68	–	
Total valid votes/Expense limit		38,259	100.00		
Total rejected ballots		186	0.48	-0.03	
Turnout		38,445	57.59	+3.57	
Eligible voters		66,756	–	–	
Liberal hold		Swing		-9.10	

2008 Canadian federal election
Party	Candidate	Votes	%	±%	Expenditures
Liberal	John McKay	18,098	50.16	-3.09	$47,878
Conservative	Chuck Konkel	10,881	30.16	+1.46	$71,234
New Democratic	Sania Khan	5,183	14.36	+0.13	$15,238
Green	Alonzo Bartley	1,913	5.30	+2.30	
Total valid votes/Expense limit		36,075	100.00	$80,466	
Total rejected ballots		186	0.51	-0.16	
Turnout		36,261	54.02	-8.36	
Eligible voters		67,124	–	–	
Liberal hold		Swing		-2.28	

2006 Canadian federal election
Party	Candidate	Votes	%	±%
Liberal	John McKay	21,875	53.25	-4.28
Conservative	Pauline Browes	11,790	28.70	+5.97
New Democratic	Peter Campbell	5,847	14.23	-1.93
Green	Mike Flanagan	1,235	3.00	-0.04
Independent	Farooq Khan	150	0.36	
Canadian Action	Brenda Thompson	98	0.23	-0.32
Independent	Andrew Thomas	82	0.19	
Total valid votes		41,077	100.00	
Total rejected ballots		276	0.67	
Turnout		41,355	62.38	
Liberal hold		Swing		-5.13

2004 Canadian federal election
Party	Candidate	Votes	%
Liberal	John McKay	20,950	57.53
Conservative	Tom Varesh	8,277	22.73
New Democratic	Sheila White	5,885	16.16
Green	Paul Charbonneau	1,106	3.04
Canadian Action	Brenda Thompson	200	0.55
Total valid votes		36,418	100.00

== See also ==
- List of Canadian electoral districts
- Historical federal electoral districts of Canada
