= Sir Oliver Mowat Collegiate Institute =

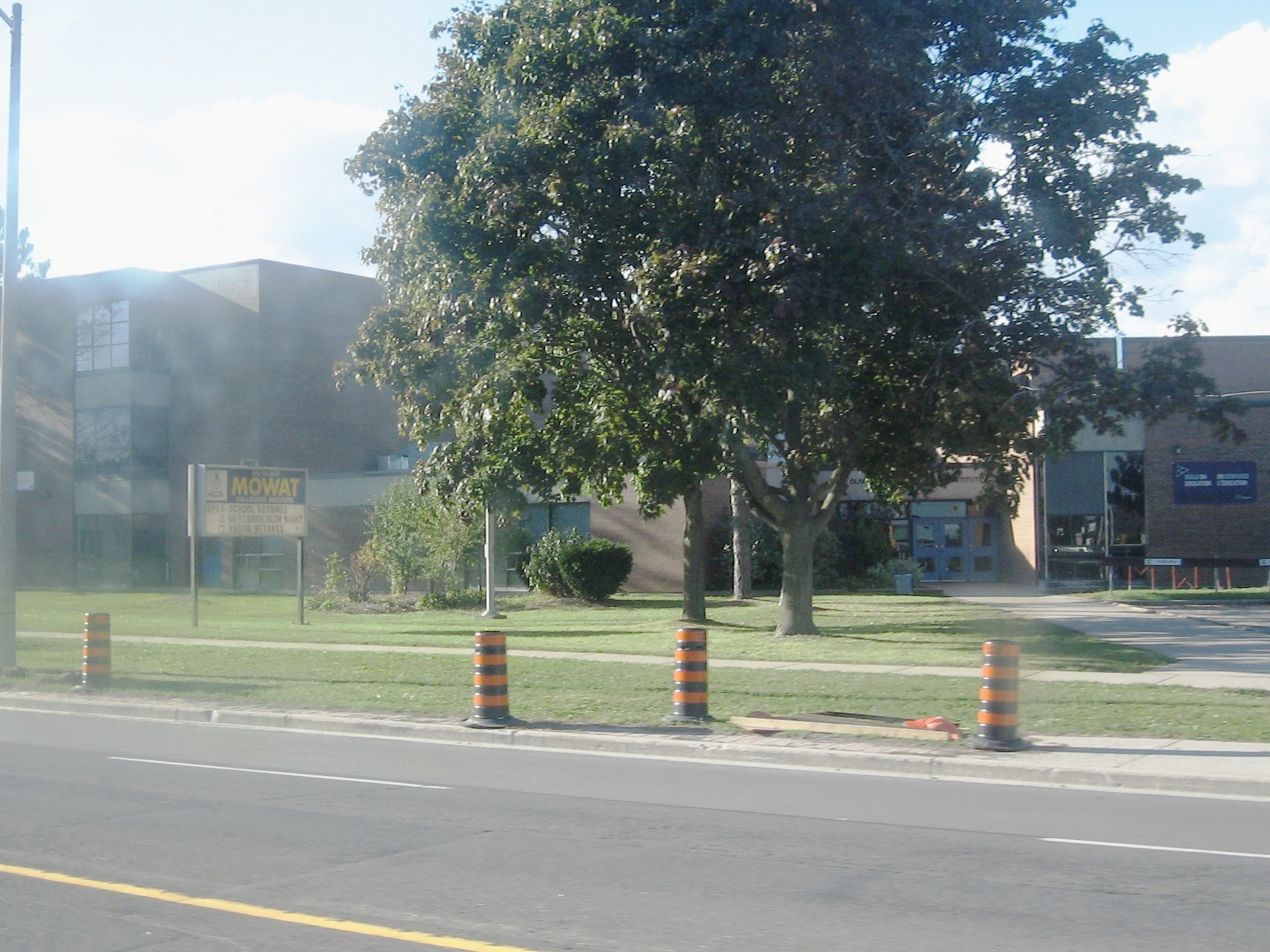
- The facade of Sir Oliver Mowat C.I.

Location
- 5400 Lawrence Avenue East; Toronto, Ontario, M1C 2C6; Canada; 43°46′45″N 79°08′31″W

Information
- School type: Public high school
- Motto: De Monte Alto (From a mount high)
- Founded: 1970
- School board: Toronto District School Board (Scarborough Board of Education)
- Superintendent: Courtney Lewis
- Area trustee: Anu Sriskandarajah; Ward 22
- School number: 4214 / 941972
- Principal: Mark Varvas
- Grades: 9-12
- Enrolment: ~950 (2025-26)
- Language: English
- Schedule type: Semestered
- Area: Rouge Hill, Toronto
- Colours: Red, Blue and Gold
- Mascot: Monte the Mustang
- Team name: Mowat Mustangs
- Website: schoolweb.tdsb.on.ca/mowatci
- Last updated: March 4, 2026

Sir Oliver Mowat Collegiate Institute is a public high school located in Toronto, Ontario, Canada. It is located in the Port Union neighbourhood of the former suburb of Scarborough. Now part of the Toronto District School Board, the school was opened in 1969 by the Scarborough Board of Education.

The school is named after Oliver Mowat, the Premier of Ontario from 1872 to 1896. Its motto is De Monte Alto ("From a mount high").

== History ==
The school was built in 1969 and was opened on September 8, 1970, as the fourteenth collegiate institute for Scarborough. The school officially opened on April 30, 1971. Mowat named for Sir Oliver Mowat, a Father of Confederation and former Ontario premier. As of April 2015, there were 1077 students enrolled at Mowat. The school originally celebrated its 50th anniversary in April 2020 but COVID-19 pandemic restrictions prevented celebrations from taking place.

== Extra-curriculars ==
- Student Administrative Council
- Prefect Council
- Music Council
- Athletic Council
- United Voices
- Wellness Team

== Feeder schools ==
- Chief Dan George Public School
- Joseph Howe Senior Public School
- Rouge Valley Public School
- William G. Miller Public School
- Joseph Brant Public School
- Charles Gordon Public School (out of area)

== Notable alumni ==
- Jim Creeggan - musician
- Steve Dangle - sports analyst, best selling author, and internet personality.

== Arms ==
Coat of arms of Sir Oliver Mowat Collegiate Institute

Notes
Granted 16 January 1995
Crest
Issuant from a rocky mount Gules an oak sapling Vert trunked and fructed of three Or.
Escutcheon
Quarterly Gules and Azure semé of acorns Or over all on a Canadian pale wavy Argent a lion rampant Sable collared Or grasping in the dexter forepaw a maple leaf Vert.
Motto
De Monte Alto (From A Mount High)

== See also ==
- Education in Ontario
- List of secondary schools in Ontario
