= Sid Seixeiro =

Canadian television broadcaster (born 1977)

- Born: March 30, 1977 (age 49)
- Occupation: television broadcaster
- Television: Breakfast Television

Sid Seixeiro (born March 30, 1977) is a Canadian broadcaster, who was a cohost of Breakfast Television on the Citytv network from March 2021 to February 2025.

Formerly cohost with Tim Micallef of the radio and television sports talk show Tim and Sid, Seixeiro was announced on January 21, 2021 as the new cohost of Breakfast Television.

Originally from Mississauga, Ontario, he is an alumnus of the broadcasting program at Humber College. He lives with his wife in Toronto and has no children.

In February 2026, he launched The Sid Seixeiro Show, a sports podcast for Sammy Cavallaro's Sick Podcast Network.
