= Gary Anandasangaree =

Canadian lawyer and politician

The Honourable Gary Anandasangaree PC KC MP
- கரி ஆனந்தசங்கரி
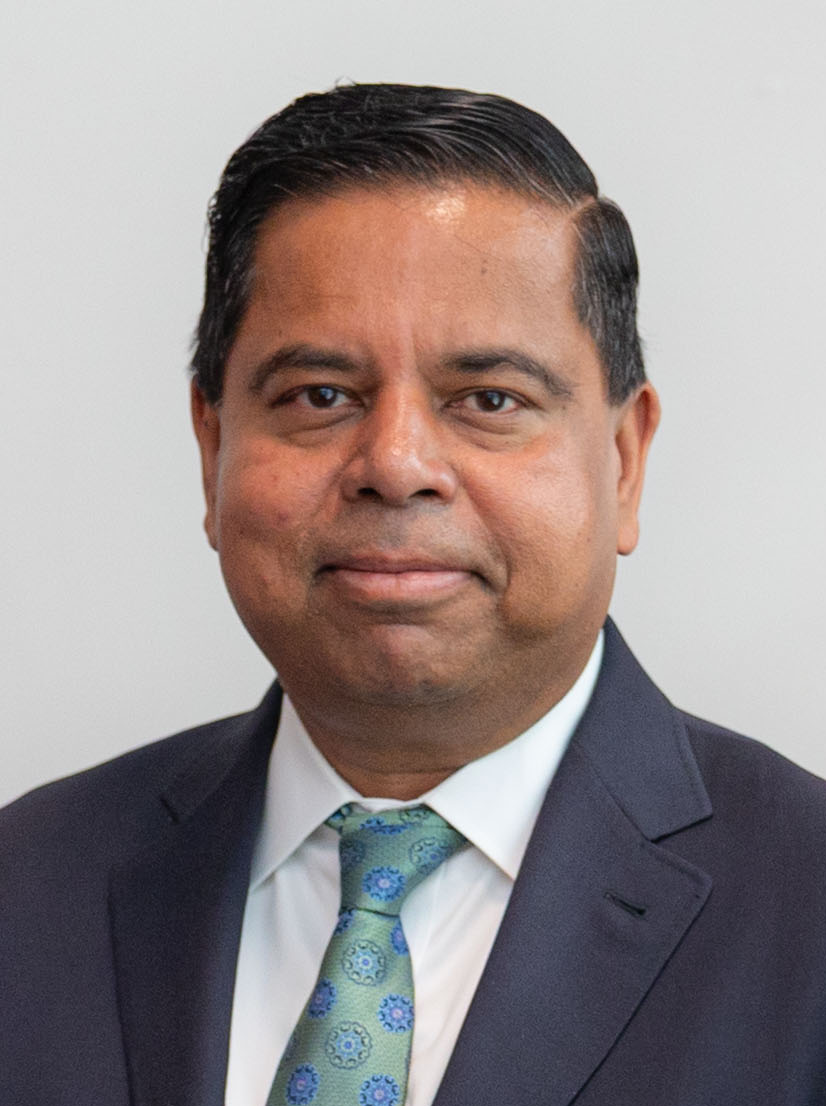
- Anandasangaree in 2025

Minister of Public Safety
- Incumbent
- Assumed office May 13, 2025
- Prime Minister: Mark Carney
- Preceded by: David McGuinty
Past ministerial positions
Minister of Justice Attorney General of Canada
In office March 14, 2025 – May 13, 2025
Prime Minister	Mark Carney
Preceded by	Arif Virani
Succeeded by	Sean Fraser
Minister of Crown–Indigenous Relations and Northern Affairs
In office December 20, 2024 – May 13, 2025
Prime Minister	Justin Trudeau; Mark Carney
Preceded by	Himself (Crown–Indigenous Relations); Dan Vandal (Northern Affairs)
Succeeded by	Rebecca Alty (Crown–Indigenous Relations); Rebecca Chartrand (Northern Affairs)
Minister responsible for the Canadian Northern Economic Development Agency
In office December 20, 2024 – March 14, 2025
Prime Minister	Justin Trudeau
Preceded by	Dan Vandal
Succeeded by	Rebecca Chartrand
Minister of Crown–Indigenous Relations
In office July 26, 2023 – December 20, 2024
Prime Minister	Justin Trudeau
Preceded by	Marc Miller
Succeeded by	Himself

Member of Parliament for Scarborough—Guildwood—Rouge Park Scarborough—Rouge Park (2015–2025)
- Incumbent
- Assumed office October 19, 2015
- Preceded by: Riding established

Personal details
- Born: Sathiyasangaree Anandasangaree; 1973 (age 52–53) Jaffna, Sri Lanka
- Citizenship: Canada; Sri Lanka
- Party: Liberal
- Parent: V. Anandasangaree
- Education: Carleton University (BA); York University (LLB)
- Profession: Lawyer

Sathiyasangaree "Gary" Anandasangaree (Tamil: சத்தியசங்கரி ஆனந்தசங்கரி; born 1973) is a Canadian politician and lawyer who has been Canada's Minister of Public Safety since 2025. A member of the Liberal Party, Anandasangaree was elected to the House of Commons in 2015 and currently serves as the member of Parliament (MP) for Scarborough—Guildwood—Rouge Park.

Anandasangaree was previously Minister of Crown–Indigenous Relations and Northern Affairs from 2024 to 2025 and Minister of Justice and Attorney General of Canada from March to May 2025. He is the second minister of Tamil descent to hold federal office, following Anita Anand.

== Early life and family ==
Anandasangaree, born in Jaffna, Sri Lanka in 1973, is the son of V. Anandasangaree, a leading Sri Lankan Tamil politician, by his second wife, Yogam. His parents separated in 1980 and he and his mother moved to Ireland, where she had relatives. They had planned to return to Sri Lanka in July 1983; but when the Black July anti-Tamil riots broke out, Anandasangaree and his mother travelled to Canada on August 31, 1983. Anandasangaree is estranged from his father and has only met him twice since 1983.

After high school Anandasangaree attended Carleton University, graduating in 1996 with a B.A. honours degree in political science. He is married and has two children, Bairavi and Sahanah.

== Career ==
Anandasangaree worked in real estate as a registered real estate broker between 1996 and 2006.

Anandasangaree studied at the Osgoode Hall Law School, the law faculty of York University. He graduated in 2005 with a LL.B. degree and was called to the bar in 2006. Anandasangaree is the principal lawyer at Gary Anandasangaree and Associates, a Toronto law firm specialising in business, real estate and international human rights law. He is a member of The Law Society of Upper Canada, Canadian Bar Association, Ontario Bar Association and South Asian Bar Association.

Anandasangaree has served on various community groups: Canadian Tamils’ Chamber of Commerce (president); Canadian Tamil Congress (counsel); Canadian Tamil Youth Development Centre (chairman); Newcomer Grants for the United Way of Greater Toronto (member); Toronto Board of Trade (member); Toronto City Summit’s Emerging Leaders Network (member); and Youth Challenge Fund (board member). He has also lectured at the Centennial College Centre for Small Business and Entrepreneurship. He has received the Queen Elizabeth II Golden Jubilee Medal and Queen Elizabeth II Diamond Jubilee Medal. He has also been awarded the TREB Award and Henry Marshall Tory Award for Service.

Anandasangaree has been a vocal campaigner against human rights abuses during the Sri Lankan Civil War and has attended several sessions of the United Nations Human Rights Council. This has led to Sinhalese Buddhist nationalists labelling Anandasangaree as a member of the militant Liberation Tigers of Tamil Eelam (LTTE).

== Political career ==
Anandasangaree became active in politics after joining the Liberal Party. In October 2013 Anandasangaree announced that he would be seeking the Liberal nomination for the Scarborough—Rouge Park for the 2015 federal election. He won the nomination election held in August 2014. He won the election held on October 19, 2015, securing 29,906 votes (60.1%).

Anandasangaree continued his advocacy for human rights in Parliament, speaking on International Human Rights Day about welcoming Syrian refugees and an Iranian scholar (Dr. Hossein Raessi) who was protected due to a joint program between Carleton University and University of Ottawa.

Anandasangaree sat on the Aboriginal Affairs and Northern Development committee in the 42nd Canadian Parliament. He was Parliamentary Secretary to Crown-Indigenous Relations Minister Marc Miller in May 2021, and on December 3 of that year was appointed Parliamentary Secretary to the Minister of Justice and Attorney General of Canada.

On July 26, 2023, Anandasangaree became the Minister of Crown-Indigenous Relations. As minister, he introduced reconciliation-focused legislation, including the National Council for Reconciliation Act, which became law, as well as bills recognizing Métis governments and modern treaty implementation. He also concluded seven modern treaties, signed a 10-year funding blueprint under the Nunavut Agreement, and announced more than 30 agreements and settlements advancing Indigenous self-determination and reconciliation. In February 2025, he signed a historic agreement with the Haida Nation recognizing Aboriginal title over Haida Gwaii (previously known as the Queen Charlotte Islands), marking the first time the federal government formally acknowledged title through negotiations.

=== Carney government ===
In the 2025 Liberal Party of Canada leadership election, he endorsed Mark Carney. In March 2025, following Mark Carney’s swearing-in as prime minister, Anandasangaree was appointed Minister of Justice and Attorney General of Canada while retaining his role as Minister of Crown–Indigenous Relations and Northern Affairs.

Anandasangaree, as Canada's Minister of Public Safety, introduced Bill C-2, the “Strong Borders Act,” in 2025, the first bill tabled by the government in the House of Commons following Prime Minister Mark Carney's election. The legislation proposed stricter border and immigration measures, including a one-year deadline for certain refugee claims, expanded powers to suspend or cancel immigration documents, broader information sharing between government agencies, and changes to Canada's application of the Safe Third Country Agreement with the United States. The bill drew criticism from refugee advocates and legal scholars who argued that some provisions could undermine refugee protections and conflict with Canada's international obligations under refugee law. Some commentators also described the bill as hypocritical in light of Anandasangaree’s previous advocacy on refugee and human rights issues affecting Tamils.

In June 2025, Anandasangaree indicated he would step back from national security decisions related to the Tamil community. He stated “In an abundance of caution, and to ensure that there is no perception of any conflict, I have asked Public Safety officials to implement a screen on any national security issues relating to the Tamil community.”

Less than one week later, Anandasangaree announced he would be recusing himself from “any matter related to the Liberation Tigers of Tamil Eelam (LTTE) or the World Tamil Movement.”, both designated terrorist organizations in Canada.

In July 2025, Global News reported that before his appointment to cabinet, Anandasangaree wrote letters urging Canadian officials to approve the immigration application of an individual who was a member of the LTTE.

=== National Commitments to Combat Antisemitism ===
On March 6, 2025, the federal government hosted the National Forum on Combatting Antisemitism, which brought together federal, provincial and municipal officials, law enforcement and prosecutors. In January 2026, Anandasangaree and Justice Minister Sean Fraser released the National Commitments to Combat Antisemitism, developed with federal, provincial, territorial and municipal partners and law enforcement. The ministers stated that the government would publish a public report on progress twice a year.

In October 2026, Canadians for Justice and Peace in the Middle East (CJPME) criticized a progress report published by Public Safety Canada. CJPME stated that the report described anti-Zionism as a form of antisemitism in two instances without defining the term, called this "a dangerous attack on legitimate political speech," and urged the government to retract it. The organization described the report as the federal government's most explicit conflation of the two concepts, following the government's 2019 adoption of the IHRA working definition of antisemitism and a 2024 handbook on the definition issued by Canadian Heritage. CJPME also endorsed demands by Independent Jewish Voices, the United Jewish People's Order and the Jewish Faculty Network that the government clarify that anti-Zionism is not a form of antisemitism, acknowledge the harm of conflating the two, and affirm the legitimacy of anti-Zionism in political debate.

The following day, CJPME launched a campaign calling on Anandasangaree to retract the statement and to affirm that anti-Zionism is a legitimate form of political expression. The campaign stated that the government "appears to be creeping towards the censorship of speech and activism in support of Palestinian human rights."

== Electoral record ==
2025 Canadian federal election: Scarborough—Guildwood—Rouge Park
Party	Candidate	Votes	%	±%	Expenditures
Liberal	Gary Anandasangaree	35,295	63.96	+2.68	
Conservative	Suchita Jalan	17,485	31.68	+9.61	
New Democratic	Kingsley Kwok	1,772	3.21	–10.17	
Green	Troy Rife	633	1.15	N/A	
Total valid votes/expense limit		55,185			
Total rejected ballots		321			
Turnout		55,506	65.42		
Eligible voters		84,845			
Liberal notional hold		Swing		–3.52	
Source: Elections Canada

2021 Canadian federal election: Scarborough—Rouge Park
Party	Candidate	Votes	%	±%	Expenditures
Liberal	Gary Anandasangaree	28,702	62.8	+0.6	
Conservative	Zia Choudhary	9,628	21.1	+1.0	
New Democratic	Kingsley Kwok	6,068	13.3	+1.8	
People's	Asad Rehman	1,322	2.9	+2.0	
Total valid votes		45,720	99.2		
Total rejected ballots		350	0.8		
Turnout		46,070	61.3		
Eligible voters		75,105			
Liberal hold		Swing		−0.2	
Source: Elections Canada

2019 Canadian federal election: Scarborough—Rouge Park
Party	Candidate	Votes	%	±%	Expenditures
Liberal	Gary Anandasangaree	31,360	62.2	+1.96	$93,933.93
Conservative	Bobby Singh	10,115	20.1	−7.26	$18,116.82
New Democratic	Kingsley Kwok	5,801	11.5	+1.14	none listed
Green	Jessica Hamilton	2,330	4.6	+2.57	none listed
People's	Dilano Sally	467	0.9	–	none listed
Christian Heritage	Mark Theodoru	353	0.7	–	none listed
Total valid votes/expense limit		50,426	100.0		
Total rejected ballots		322			
Turnout		50,748	66.4		
Eligible voters		76,408			
Liberal hold		Swing		+4.61	
Source: Elections Canada

2015 Canadian federal election: Scarborough—Rouge Park
Party	Candidate	Votes	%	±%	Expenditures
Liberal	Gary Anandasangaree	29,913	60.24	+25.48	$144,189.04
Conservative	Leslyn Lewis	13,587	27.36	-4.23	$59,291.73
New Democratic	KM Shanthikumar	5,145	10.36	-20.63	$58,736.40
Green	Calvin Winter	1,010	2.03	-0.36	$1,457.51
Total valid votes/expense limit		49,655	100.0	–	$204,974.26
Total rejected ballots		235	0.47	New	
Turnout		49,890	69.98	New	
Eligible voters		71,291			
Source: Elections Canada

Order of precedence
Preceded by Sean Fraser as Member of the Cabinet	Order of Precedence of Canada as Member of the Cabinet	Succeeded by Rechie Valdez as Member of the Cabinet
