= Moev =

Canadian electronic band

- Origin: Vancouver, British Columbia, Canada
- Genres: Electronic; synth-pop; dance-pop; industrial rock
- Years active: 1981–1991; 1999–2001; 2007–present
- Labels: Atlantic; Nettwerk; COP International; Profile; Go!; Carved Out
- Members: Tom Ferris; Julie Ferris
- Past members: Cal Stephenson; Mark Jowett; Madeleine Morris; Steve Lowther; Christine Jones; Michela Arichiello; Kelly Cook; Dean Russell; Anthony Valcic; Ron Thaler; Drew Maxwell; Kevin Kane

Moev is an electronic band based in Vancouver, British Columbia. Initially formed in 1981, Moev released their debut album in 1982, Zimmerkampf, through the independent label Go! Records. After various issues with Go!, the members of Moev co-founded the label Nettwerk Records as an outlet for the band's music, which led to the release of Dusk and Desire in 1986. Although Nettwerk grew in popularity over the subsequent few years, Moev also signed with the major label Atlantic Records. The band released two additional albums, 1988's Yeah, Whatever and 1990's Head Down, prior to disbanding in 1991. Moev reformed in 1999, releasing Suffer in 2000, followed by another hiatus the following year. Moev reformed again in 2007, which led to the albums Ventilation in 2010 and One Minute World in 2013.

Multi-instrumentalist and producer Tom Ferris has been the only consistent member of the band since its formation in 1981. The current incarnation of the band also includes his wife, Julie Ferris (who initially joined in 1999).

== History ==
=== Formation, Zimmerkampf, and founding of Nettwerk (1981–1984) ===
In 1981, two high school friends in Vancouver, Tom Ferris and Cal Stephenson, had sought to create music together which leaned into an electronic style. Stephenson handled keyboards and occasional vocals while Ferris played keyboards and guitar, although both individuals focused on production work as well. After the joining of drummer Steve Lowther (who also played horns), guitarist Mark Jowett was recruited via an advertisement in The Georgia Straight. After laying out some basic demos, the quartet then found vocalist Madeleine Morris through The Georgia Straight. Notably, Morris' mother was Dolores Claman, who achieved fame in the 1960s with "The Hockey Theme" and "A Place to Stand", in addition to creating thousands of commercial jingles with her husband Richard Morris.

The band named themselves Moev, which was later explained as a variation on the color mauve, with mauve as a "pretty purplish pink" and Moev as "the color of insanity". Some of the group's influences included Orchestral Manoeuvres in the Dark, Kraftwerk, Magazine, Ultravox, and Siouxsie and the Banshees. Both Moev and Images in Vogue performed their first live shows together in 1981 at a Vancouver new wave fashion show, dubbed Elektra: The Fashion Dance. Moev also hooked up with a Vancouver record store employee, Terry McBride, as their manager. McBride established the short-lived label Noetix in order to release Moev's debut EP, Cracked Mirror, in 1981. Although distribution was limited to Vancouver, McBride circulated the EP within the music industry, which eventually caught the attention of the San Francisco-based label Go! Records. Around the same time, Lowther departed from the band, and the lineup stayed as a four-piece.

Moev temporarily left Vancouver for San Francisco in order to record their full-length debut album. The album, Zimmerkampf, was released in 1982 through Go!, with "Rotting Geraniums" as the lead single; however, the label went through a series of financial struggles, and as a result Moev departed from the label and returned to Vancouver. Upon their return, Morris left the band and joined Family Plot. In 1984, frustrated with how their music was being released, Moev's remaining members (Jowett, Ferris, and Stephenson) co-founded the label Nettwerk Records alongside McBride. McBride handled the management aspects and Jowett mainly worked as an executive for talent-related matters. In addition, Ferris and Stephenson created and operated Limited Vision Studio for the label. Moev then brought in Christine Jones as vocalist for the three-song Toulyev EP (with "Clerk Charade" as the lead track) in 1984; the EP was also the first ever release by Nettwerk. By the end of the year, Michela Arrichiello replaced Jones as vocalist.

=== Dusk and Desire, major label signing, and Yeah, Whatever (1984–1989) ===
In 1986, Moev released their second album, Dusk and Desire. Along with distribution by Nettwerk, the album was also released in other countries by the American label Profile Records. Moev's popularity increased as they released the singles "Alibis" and "Took Out the Lace" in support of the album. Dusk and Desire featured a variety of musicians, such as Greg Reely, Dave Ogilvie, and Kelly Cook. Around the same time, Cook joined Moev as bassist and guitarist. Throughout 1986 and 1987, multiple bands recorded at Moev's studio, which included Skinny Puppy, Numb, and Single Gun Theory. By early 1987, two members of Moev had parted ways with the band, as Jowett decided to focus on Nettwerk in a full-time capacity and Arrichiello encountered health issues which prevented her from playing live shows. Both Ferris and Stephenson had also started to distance themselves from Nettwerk's business dealings. Also in 1987, Nettwerk released the compilation The Early Years, which combined both "Rotting Geraniums" and Zimmerkampf into one package (as both releases were previously only released on vinyl).

Ferris, Stephenson, and Cook regrouped later in 1987, and through a mixture of magazine advertisements and mutual acquaintances, Anthony Valcic joined as drummer/keyboardist and Dean Russell joined as vocalist. The band initially released the singles "Wanting" and "Capital Heaven". Afterwards, Stephenson left the band in order to return to school. Moev ultimately spent two years recording their third album, Yeah, Whatever. It was once again released by Nettwerk, but by the end of the year, Moev had signed to the major label Atlantic Records for international distribution. By the end of 1988, Ron Thaler had replaced Valcic on drums. In the summer of 1989, Moev toured the US alongside Clan of Xymox in support of Yeah, Whatever. In the US, two of the album's singles had attained success on Billboard's Dance Club Songs chart, as "Yeah, Whatever" peaked at No. 32 and "Crucify Me" peaked at No. 38. Yeah, Whatever also found support in the US as the album peaked at No. 95 on CMJ's Radio Top 100 chart.

=== Head Down and first disbandment (1989–1991) ===
After touring concluded in 1989, Ferris, Cook, and Russell reconvened in the studio. Moev's fourth album, Head Down, was released in August 1990, once again through Nettwerk and Atlantic. Head Down featured drumming contributions from Thaler prior to his departure from the band. Another contributor was Sarah McLachlan, who provided backing vocals to a number of songs; at that point, McLachlan had only released one solo album, but was being promoted by Nettwerk as an international breakout artist. The album found minor success in the US as it peaked at No. 36 on CMJ's Radio Top 150 chart.

Due to disagreements with the label's handling of Moev and other internal conflicts, Moev distanced themselves from Nettwerk in 1990. In addition, Ferris closed Limited Vision Studio, with Head Down and Front Line Assembly's Gashed Senses & Crossfire as the last major albums recorded there. In 1991, Nettwerk released the compilation Obituary Column Ha without Ferris' consent. It compiled together various b-sides and alternate mixes from Moev's career. The band then became officially inactive in 1991.

=== Russell's death and various projects (1991–1999) ===
After Moev's disbanding, Russell formed the two-man project Bacteria with guitarist E.H. Stewart. They independently released the album Identification in 1992; however, Russell's health declined, and he left the band soon after. Russell died in 1994 due to complications from AIDS.

Ferris co-founded the band Econoline Crush alongside Chris Meyers and Trevor Hurst in early 1992. After appearing on 1993's The Purge Demo, Ferris departed from the band due to both musical differences and a disinterest towards national touring. Ferris mainly focused on work with other artists, such as Blackland (essentially a solo project by former Front Line Assembly member Michael Balch) and Waiting for God. In 1994, Ferris and Stephenson filed a lawsuit against Nettwerk, which revolved around the two's roles as original partners in the label. The lawsuit was eventually settled in 1998.

=== Reformation, Suffer, and hiatus (1999–2007) ===
In 1999, Ferris reformed Moev alongside his wife Julie Ferris as vocalist. The lineup also included the return of Stephenson as keyboardist/vocalist and Cook as bassist, in addition to Drew Maxwell as guitarist. Tom Ferris had found a band named Redshifted on the internet, and after reaching out, he discovered that the project was basically a solo effort by Maxwell. Moev self-released the mini-album Suffer in late 1999, although by early 2000 it was properly distributed by COP International. In 2001, Moev went on another hiatus. The Ferris couple then worked with vocalist Kevin Kane of The Grapes of Wrath in the side project Lazarazu. Lazarazu released their only album in 2003, Floodlit. For the live band, Cook (formerly of Moev) joined as bassist and Brian Berry (formerly of 10 Ft. Henry) joined as drummer. Tom Ferris also briefly worked with Leon Gaer in the ambient project Declassified, releasing a self-titled album in 2007.

=== Second reformation, Ventilation, and One Minute World (2007–present) ===
In 2007, Tom Ferris and Julie Ferris reactivated Moev. Their former bandmate in Lazarazu, Kane, had also briefly joined Moev as guitarist. After sharing various one-off songs on the internet and playing sporadic live shows, Moev released the album Ventilation in 2010. Ventilation was self-released by the band, with a physical edition arriving nearly a year after its digital release. In 2011, Moev's former vocalist Arrichiello died at the age of 51 after various health complications.

Moev's seventh major studio release, One Minute World, was released in 2013. One Minute World was not physically pressed, although an expanded edition, titled One Minute World (Remixed, Remastered, Bonus Mixes), was digitally released the following year. In 2020, in support of the Houston venue Numbers, Moev contributed three cover songs to the compilation Numbers Covered.

== Members ==
=== Current ===
- Tom Ferris – keyboards, programming, guitars (1981–1991, 1999–2001, 2007–present)
- Julie Ferris – vocals (1999–2001, 2007–present)

=== Former ===
- Cal Stephenson – vocals, keyboards (1981–1987, 1999–2001)
- Mark Jowett – guitars (1981–1987)
- Madeleine Morris – vocals (1981–1984)
- Steve Lowther – drums, horns (1981–1982)
- Christine Jones – vocals (1984)
- Michela Arrichiello – vocals (1984–1987); died 2011
- Kelly Cook – bass, guitars, programming (1986–1991, 1999–2001)
- Dean Russell – vocals (1987–1991); died 1994
- Anthony Valcic – drums, keyboards (1987–1988)
- Ron Thaler – drums (1988–1990)
- Drew Maxwell – guitars (1999–2001)
- Kevin Kane – guitars (2007–2010)

=== Timeline ===
Color denotes main live duty.

== Discography ==
=== Studio albums ===
- Zimmerkampf (1982, Go! Records)
- Dusk and Desire (1986, Nettwerk Records/Profile Records)
- Yeah, Whatever (1988, Atlantic Records/Nettwerk Records)
- Head Down (1990, Atlantic Records/Nettwerk Records)
- Suffer (2000, COP International) (Note: Released as a mini-album. Originally self-released by the band in 1999 but was then given a proper nationwide release in 2000 by COP. It was expanded with additional tracks from the same era/sessions in 2014.)
- Ventilation (2010, Carved Out Publishing)
- One Minute World (2013, Carved Out Publishing)

=== Compilation albums ===
- The Early Years (1987, CD Presents)
- Obituary Column Ha (1991, Nettwerk Records)
- Live 1982 (2019, Carved Out Publishing)

=== Singles and EPs ===
- Cracked Mirror (1981)
- "Rotting Geraniums" (1982)
- "In Your Head" (1982)
- Toulyev (1984)
- "Alibis" (1984)
- "Took Out the Lace" (1986)
- "Wanting" (1987)
- "Capital Heaven" (1987)
- "Yeah, Whatever" (1988)
- "Crucify Me" (1988)
- "Head Down" (1990)
- "In and Out" (1990)
- "Suffer" (1999)
