= La Soirée du hockey =

- On-air TV logo for La Soirée du hockey, used in program identification, title card, and for TV on-air uniforms of TV on-air personalities.
- Also known as: La Soirée du hockey Molson à Radio-Canada (1988–1998); La Soirée du hockey Molson Export à Radio-Canada (1998–2002)
- Presented by: Rene Lecavalier (1952–1985); Raymond Lebrun (1973–1977); Winston McQuade (1977–1982); Serge Arsenault (1982–1988); Richard Garneau (1985–1990); Jean Pagé (1988–1989); Camille Dube (1989–1997); Claude Quenneville (1990–2002)
- Starring: Rene Lecavalier (1952–1985); Raymond Lebrun (1973–1977); Winston McQuade (1977–1982); Serge Arsenault (1982–1988); Richard Garneau (1985–1990); Jean Pagé (1988–1989); Camille Dube (1989–1997); Claude Quenneville (1990–2002); Jean-Maurice Bailly (1952–1970); Gilles Tremblay (1970–1998); Robert Pepin (1972); Claude Mailhot (1972–1982); Paul Larivee (1978); Bernard Brisset (1980); Gerard Potvin (1981); Mario Tremblay (1986–1988); Yvon Pedneault (1994); Michel Bergeron (1998–2002); Ron Fournier; Pierre Bouchard
- Theme music composer: Dolores Claman
- Opening theme: "The Hockey Theme"
- Country of origin: Canada
- Original language: French

Production
- Production locations: Montreal Forum, Montreal (until 1996); Bell Centre (formerly Molson Centre), Montreal (since 1996)
- Camera setup: multi-camera
- Running time: >3 hours
- Production companies: MacLaren Advertising/Canadian Sports Network (1931–1986); Don Ohlmeyer Communications/Molstar Communications (1986–1988); SRC/Radio-Canada Sports and Molstar Communications (1988–1998); SRC/Radio-Canada Sports (1998–2004)

Original release
- Network: Télévision de Radio-Canada (1952–2004); RDS (2002–2004)
- Release: October 11, 1952 – June 13, 2002

Related
- LNH à RDS

La Soirée du hockey (literally translated to The Night of Hockey) was the French language equivalent of the English Canadian CBC's NHL broadcasts Hockey Night in Canada produced by Radio-Canada, which targets National Hockey League (NHL) broadcasts, usually featuring the Montreal Canadiens. Similar to its English language counterpart, the show used "The Hockey Theme" as its theme song. The show ran from 1952 to 2004.

== Games covered ==
La Soirée du hockey most frequently featured Montreal Canadiens games on Saturday evenings, usually in parallel with English-language broadcasts on CBC. In later years, CBC would drop some of its split-national telecasts in the 7 p.m. ET window, resulting in a single national telecast at that time (most of the time featuring the Toronto Maple Leafs), while Radio-Canada continued to feature the Canadiens. The broadcast featured Quebec Nordiques and Ottawa Senators games occasionally during the regular season on rare occasions where the Canadiens were idle on Saturday night.

During the playoffs, La Soirée du hockey featured all games involving the Montreal Canadiens. After they were eliminated from further contention (or if they did not make the playoffs that season), the program usually featured series of interest to French Canadians, all the way to the Stanley Cup Final.

== Collaboration with Réseau des sports ==
Beginning with the 2002–03 season, RDS secured exclusive French language rights to the NHL. The deal, reached with the Canadiens and not directly with the league, was meant to ensure a consistent home for all Canadiens games; as a general-interest network, Radio-Canada cannot give up so much airtime to Canadiens games. The announcement drew the ire of, among others, then-Heritage Minister Sheila Copps, who suggested that the network would somehow be violating its conditions of licence by not airing La Soirée du hockey. In fact, there is no specific mention in the CBC's licence from the CRTC (or any other legal document governing the CBC) that the CBC's networks carry coverage of NHL games, nor that there be parity between the two networks' carriage of such games.

Radio-Canada soon reached an agreement to produce the Saturday night games, to remain branded La Soirée du hockey, to be simulcast on both SRC and RDS.

=== Le Hockey du samedi soir ===
For reasons that are unclear, the SRC production agreement was terminated after the 2004 playoffs. Instead, RDS began to produce its own Saturday night broadcasts, titled Le Hockey du samedi soir. These were simulcast on SRC—but only outside Quebec, where RDS has limited distribution—for two further seasons through 2006. At that point, French-language rights to NHL hockey became fully exclusive to RDS.

== Present day ==
The national French-language NHL package, including all Saturday broadcasts, moved to TVA Sports (under sub-licence from Rogers Communications) in 2014, with RDS reduced to airing a slate of Canadiens games within the team's home television territory, to be later supplemented with local Ottawa Senators games as the teams have the same broadcast region. While Rogers licensed the rights to the "Hockey Night in Canada" name from the CBC for its Saturday broadcasts until 2026, the rights to the "La Soirée du hockey" branding were not included in that deal. Instead, TVA Sports branded its Saturday telecasts as La super soirée LNH (NHL Super Evening) and, unlike its English language counterpart, has not offered broadcasts to Radio-Canada.

In 2026, the Professional Women's Hockey League was named the new occupant for the Hockey Night in Canada franchise, with the CBC also acquiring French language rights for Radio-Canada, including exclusive rights to the Montreal Victoire. The announcement of the agreement did not specify whether PWHL broadcasts on Radio-Canada would revive the La Soirée du hockey brand.

== List of commentators ==
=== Radio personnel ===
- Roland Beaudry (1937), play-by-play announcer
- Charles Mayer (1940s–1950s), established and hosted the French language equivalent of the Hot Stove League on radio broadcasts, and made the choice of the game's three stars
- Michel Normandin (1945), play-by-play announcer
- René Lecavalier - He was also the first commentator for La Soirée du hockey. He broadcast games for the Montreal Canadiens on radio and television for over 30 years and retired in 1985. He was as revered in French Canada as Foster Hewitt was in English Canada.
- Lionel Duval, play-by-play announcer
- Richard Garneau (1957–1985), play-by-play announcer
- Claude Quenneville (1980), play-by-play announcer
- René Pothier (1991), play-by-play announcer

=== TV play-by-play announcers ===
- René Lecavalier (1952–1985)
- (1973–1977)
- (1977–1982)
- (1982–1988)
- Richard Garneau (1985–1990)
- Jean Pagé (1988–1989)
- (1989–1997)
- Claude Quenneville (1990–2002)

=== TV colour commentators ===
- Jean-Maurice Bailly (1952–1970)
- Gilles Tremblay (1970–1998)
- Robert Pépin (1972)
- (1972–1982)
- Paul Larivée (1978)
- Bernard Brisset (1980)
- Gérard Potvin (1981)
- Mario Tremblay (1986–1988)
- Gordon Sawyer (1994)
- Yvon Pednault (1995)
- Michel Bergeron (1998–2002)
- Ron Fournier
- Pierre Bouchard

== See also ==
- List of Quebec television series
- Television of Quebec
- Culture of Quebec

| Preceded by none | NHL French network broadcast partner in Canada; 1952–2002 | Succeeded by RDS |
