= Rudy Toth =

Czech–Canadian musician (1925–2009)

- Born: 16 December 1925; Stare Karasnow, Czechoslovakia
- Origin: Toronto, Ontario, Canada
- Died: 9 July 2009 (aged 83) Lisle, Ontario, Canada
- Occupations: Composer, arranger, conductor, musician
- Instruments: Piano, cimbalom
- Years active: 1940s-1980s

Rudy Toth (16 December 1925 – 9 July 2009) was a Canadian composer, arranger, conductor, pianist, and cimbalom player of Slovak birth. As a composer he wrote works mainly for television and the radio, working frequently for the Canadian Broadcasting Company for over three decades. As a pianist he performed in a number of jazz and dance bands in Toronto and played for radio productions at the CBC. For many years he was active as a concert cimbalom player, appearing as a soloist with symphony orchestras in both Canada and the United States.

== Early life and education ==
Born in Stare Karasnow, Czechoslovakia, Toth was the son of violinist and cimbalom maker Carl Toth and the elder brother of musicians Jerry Toth and Tony Toth. He was the only child in the family not born in Canada as the family emigrated to Windsor, Ontario, shortly after his birth. As a child he studied the cimbalom with his father. He studied at The Royal Conservatory of Music (RCM) during the 1940s where his instructors included Boris Berlin (piano), John Weinzweig (harmony), and Ettore Mazzoleni (conducting). He pursued further studies in conducting with Walter Susskind in Toronto and at the Tanglewood Music Center with Leonard Bernstein. In 1950 he went to Paris to study the Piano with Gaby Casadesus.

== Career ==
Toth began his performance career playing in dance bands in Toronto while studying at the RCM in the early 1940s. He played in bands led by Stan Patton, Ellis McLintock, and Bert Niosi among others. In the late 1940s he began working as a pianist for the Canadian Broadcasting Corporation, collaborating frequently on radio programs featuring Howard Cable. He soon was employed by CBC Television as a music director for television programs starring Joan Fairfax, Wally Koster, and Denny Vaughan among others. During the late 1950s he played the piano in Phil Nimmons' jazz band "Nimmons 'N' Nine". He also actively performed as a cimbalom player up until his retirement in 1989, notably appearing as a soloist in works by Bartók, Kodály, and Stravinsky with orchestras like the Buffalo Philharmonic Orchestra, the Ivan Romanoff Orchestra, the Ottawa Symphony Orchestra, and the Toronto Symphony Orchestra.

Toth ceased working as a music director at the CBC in 1965, after which he concentrated his efforts on composing jingles and theme music for radio and television. He worked frequently on jingles and theme music with his brother Jerry and with composers Dolores Claman and Richard Morris between 1965 and 1970; with the group operating together as Quartet Productions. He and Jerry then formed their own company, Seven-O Productions, with whom he was active composing music for radio and television from 1970 to 1980. The brother's notably orchestrated the music (with Rudy conducting) for the Emmy Award nominated CBS production of Once Upon the Brothers Grimm. They also collaborated on several CBC TV specials during the 1970s.

Toth died in Lisle, Ontario, in 2009 at the age of 83. His wife was the violinist and lyricist Josephine Toth (née Chuchman). She notably contributed lyrics to several of her husband's projects, including works on the 1977 LP album Canada: A Young People's Musical Tour of Canada's Provinces and Territories.
