= Hockey Night in Canada =

CBC broadcasts of professional hockey in Canada

- The logo used for PWHL broadcasts as of 2026
- Also known as: Hockey Night in Canada presented by Rogers (2023–2026); Hockey Night in Canada on Sportsnet (2014–2026); Hockey Night in Canada on CBC (1998–2014); Molson Hockey Night in Canada on CBC (1988–1998); Imperial Esso Hockey Broadcast (1934–1950s); General Motors Hockey Broadcast (1931–1934)
- Presented by: NHL games: Foster Hewitt (Radio 1931–1965); Bill Hewitt (TV Broadcaster 1958–1981; Toronto play by play); Scott Young, Wes McKnight, and Tom Foley (1957–1959); Ward Cornell (1959–1972; Toronto games); Frank Selke Jr. (1960–1967; Montreal games); Dan Kelly (1967–1968, 1978–1979; Montreal games); Ted Darling (1968–1970; Montreal games); Bill Good Jr. and Ted Reynolds (1970–1976; Vancouver games); Brian McFarlane (1970–1991; Montreal and Winnipeg games); Dave Hodge (1971–1987); Mike Anscombe (1973–1974; Montreal games); Dave Reynolds (1975–1978; Montreal games); Steve Armitage (1977–2008; Vancouver games); Dick Irvin Jr. (1977–1999; Montreal games); Ron MacLean (1986–2014, 2022–2026; early and late games, 2016–2022; early games); Don Cherry (1980–2019; early and late games); George Stroumboulopoulos (2014–2016); David Amber (2016–2022; late games, 2023–2026; late games during Scotiabank Hockey Day in Canada); PWHL games: Andi Petrillo (2026–present)
- Starring: Studio Analysts: Cassie Campbell-Pascall; Hailey Salvian; Play-by-play: Daniella Ponticelli; Colour Commentator: Becky Kellar; Rinkside Reporter: Rob Pizzo
- Theme music composer: John Herberman (2014–2026)
- Opening theme: "The Hockey Theme" (1968–2008); "Canadian Gold" (2008–2026)
- Country of origin: Canada
- Original language: English

Production
- Production locations: Maple Leaf Gardens, Toronto, and Montreal Forum (radio, 1931–1976); Studio 7, 263 Mutual Street, Toronto (1952–1992); Canadian Broadcasting Centre, Toronto (1992–2021, 2026–present); Rogers Building, Toronto (2021–2026)
- Camera setup: multi-camera
- Running time: >6 hours
- Production companies: MacLaren Advertising/Canadian Sports Network (1931–1986); Don Ohlmeyer Communications/Molstar Communications (1986–1988); CBC Sports and Molstar Communications (1988–1998); CBC Sports (1998–2014, 2026–present); Sportsnet (2014–2026)

Original release
- Network: CNR Radio (1931–1933); Canadian Radio Broadcasting Commission (1933–1936); CBC Radio (1936–1976)
- Release: November 12, 1931 – May 16, 1976
- Network: CBC Television (1952–2026; NHL, 2026–present; PWHL) (Saturday games); CBC Gem (2023–2026, NHL Games excluding playoffs; 2026–present, PWHL Games) (streaming); CTV (1965–1975) (Wednesday games); Sportsnet/FX/Citytv/Omni Television (2014–2026); NHL Network (Canada) (2009–2014) (select playoff games); NHL Network (United States) (2008–2014) (regular season); NHL Center Ice/NHL Centre Ice (1995–2014) (out-of-market games); CHEX-DT (2008–2014) (Peterborough area, select playoff games with NHL Network); CBCSports.ca (2008–2014, 2026–present) (all national/regional games, including alternate playoff games)
- Release: NHL games: October 11, 1952 – June 14, 2026
- Release: PWHL games: beginning December 5, 2026

Related
- NHL on Sportsnet; NHL on ABC; (U.S. over-the-air broadcaster); La Soirée du hockey; Saturday Night Hockey; (Successor for NHL broadcasts in Canada)

Hockey Night in Canada (often abbreviated Hockey Night or HNiC) is a long-running program which broadcasts ice hockey play-by-play coverage, initially of National Hockey League games on radio and later television in Canada from 1931 until 2026 and then coverage of Professional Women's Hockey League games on television from December 2026 onwards. Its roots are pioneering hockey coverage that was carried on local private radio stations as early as 1923. The national radio broadcast began in 1931 as the General Motors Hockey Broadcast, featuring the Toronto Maple Leafs, and by 1933 was also broadcasting Montreal games in Quebec.

The broadcast gained its long-standing name shortly after becoming one of the founding programs of the Canadian Broadcasting Corporation (CBC) when it was formed in 1936.

With the launch of CBC Television in 1952, the program became a Canadian Saturday night cultural fixture and was an exclusive mainstay of CBC Sports through the 2013–14 NHL season. Hockey Night in Canada continued to be simulcast on CBC Radio until 1965.

On television, it expanded to several other outlets in a cross-licensing arrangement following Rogers Media's acquisition of exclusive NHL television rights in Canada beginning in 2014–15; the CBC maintains ownership of the Hockey Night in Canada brand itself.

Saturday NHL broadcasts began in 1931 on the CNR Radio network, and debuted on television in 1952. Doubleheader games debuted in 1995 at 7:30 pm and 10:30 pm (ET) start times. From 1998 until 2026, the games began at 7:00 pm and 10:00 pm (ET). The broadcast featured various segments during the intermissions and between games, as well as pre-game and post-game coverage of games that day, and player interviews. It also shows the hosts' opinions on news and issues occurring in the league.

Ahead of the 2014–15 season, Rogers Media secured exclusive national multimedia rights to NHL games and would sub-license Saturday night and playoff games to the CBC. In addition, the HNiC brand would be licensed to Rogers for Sportsnet-produced Saturday NHL broadcasts airing on CBC Television, as well as the Rogers-owned Citytv and Sportsnet outlets. This sub-license agreement runs through the end of the Rogers deal with the NHL.

On June 16, 2026, CBC and Rogers Sportsnet announced that the sublicensing agreement would not be renewed following the end of the 2026 NHL playoffs, bringing to an end the broadcast of NHL games on CBC Television after 74 years, and an end to the CBC's relationship with the NHL after 90 years, first on radio and then on television. However,

== History ==
=== Radio ===
Hockey broadcasting originated with play-by-play radio broadcasts from Toronto's Arena Gardens, which began on February 8, 1923, on Toronto station CFCA when Norman Albert announced the third period of play of an intermediate men's Ontario Hockey Association game. Foster Hewitt took over announcing duties within a month, and after several years of sporadic coverage that began to include National Hockey League games, the broadcasts went national in 1931 as the General Motors Hockey Broadcast. The program began broadcasting Saturday-night Toronto Maple Leafs games on November 12, 1931, over the Canadian National Railway radio network, of which CFCA was an affiliate. The more-powerful CFRB replaced CFCA as the program's Toronto flagship station in 1932. The show was sponsored by General Motors Products of Canada and produced by MacLaren Advertising, which had acquired exclusive radio-broadcasting rights for Maple Leaf Gardens from Conn Smythe in 1931 and produced the TV broadcast that became Hockey Night in Canada from 1952 until 1988.

The Canadian Radio Broadcasting Commission (CRBC) broadcast Montreal Canadiens and Maroons games on its Quebec stations in 1933. Imperial Oil took over sponsorship from General Motors the following year, and the broadcast became known as the Imperial Esso Hockey Broadcast. The broadcasts began at 9 p.m. Eastern Time, around the start of the second period of play. The games began to be broadcast on the Canadian Broadcasting Corporation (CBC), the CRBC's successor, in 1936. The program acquired what would become its permanent title—Hockey Night in Canada—around that time, which was coined by Foster Hewitt. It featured the Maple Leafs and was hosted by Gordon Calder, with play-by-play announcer Hewitt and colour commentary by Percy Lesueur, in much of Ontario and points west. Montreal Maroons broadcasts were hosted by Doug Smith and Elmer Ferguson in English, and René Lecavalier called Montreal Canadiens games in French. After the Maroons folded in 1938, Smith and Ferguson hosted Canadiens games in English. The popularity of the radio show (and Hewitt) across Canada made it an obvious choice for early Canadian network-television programming.

Although it was never carried on a U.S. radio station, HNIC became popular with listeners in the northern United States; if a U.S.-based team (in Boston, Chicago, Detroit, or New York City) was playing in Toronto on a Saturday night, thousands of fans in the American city whose team faced the Leafs would listen to the CBC broadcast via skywave (usually via 50,000-watt flagships CBL or CBM); a game often attracted more listeners to HNIC than local stations did.

CBC Radio aired Saturday-night HNIC broadcasts through 1965, followed by Sunday Night NHL Hockey through 1976 (when the program moved to national television). Toronto's CFRB (originally a CNR Radio affiliate) took over the broadcast from CFCA in 1932, and continued to broadcast Maple Leaf games for many years with CBC Radio's Toronto station CBL.

=== Television ===
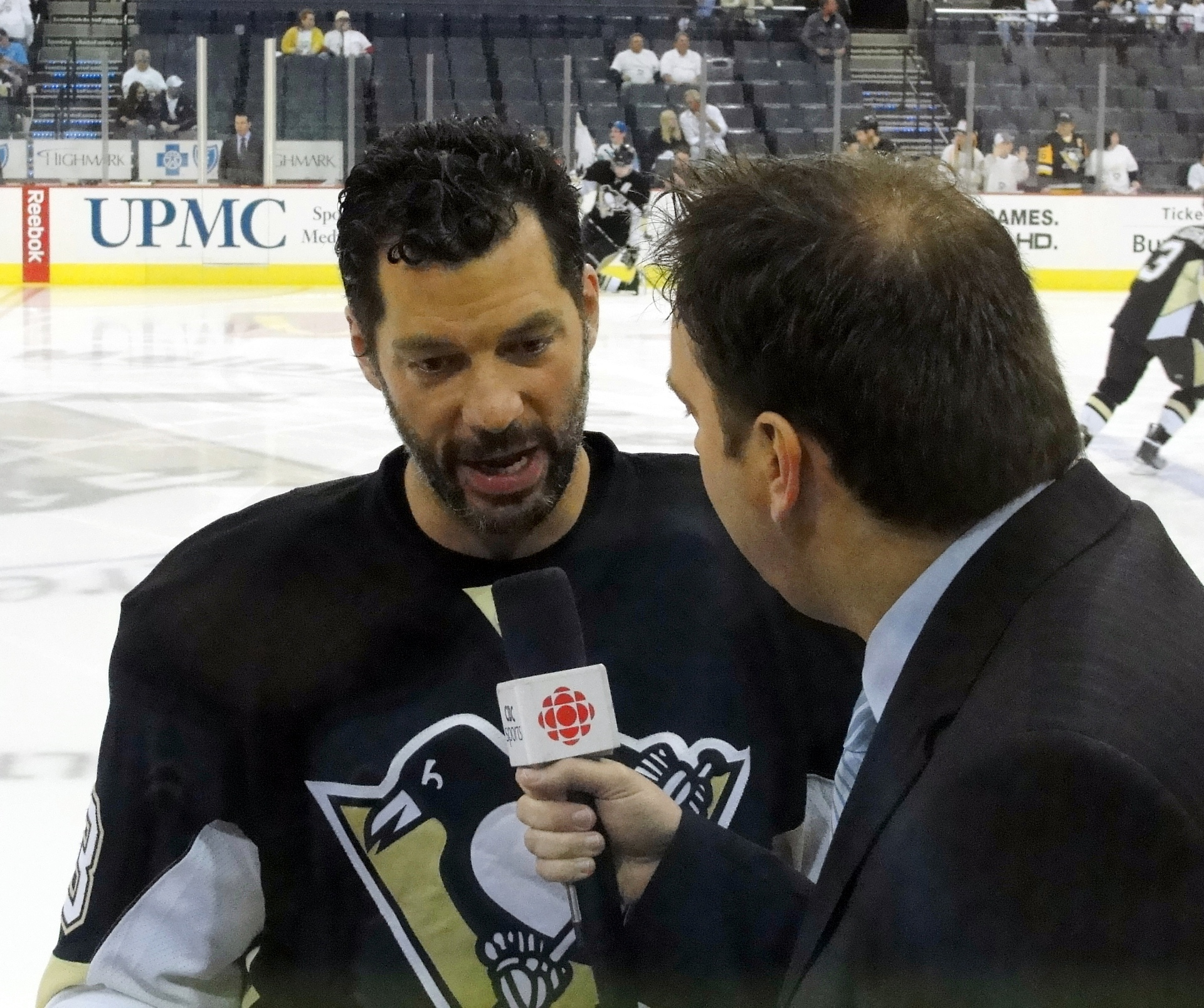
Bill Guerin of the Pittsburgh Penguins is interviewed by HNIC reporter Elliotte Friedman before a May 8, 2010 playoff game against the Montreal Canadiens at Mellon Arena.

Hockey Night in Canada began airing on Saturday nights on CBC Television in 1952. According to the CBC, instant replay made its world debut on a 1955 HNIC broadcast; CBC director George Retzlaff made a kinescope of a goal, and replayed it for the television audience seconds later.

Regular-season games were not broadcast in their entirety until 1968, and only one game was televised each Saturday night until the 1990s. From 1952 to 1964, the HNIC telecast followed the lead of the radio broadcast by beginning at 9 p.m. ET; games were typically joined in progress shortly before (or during) the second period. Its start time was moved up to 8:30 p.m. ET at the beginning of the 1963–64 season, allowing games to be joined in progress late in the first period. In the fall of 1968, regular-season games were shown in their entirety and the program began at 8 p.m. Although a handful of games were broadcast in colour during the 1966–67 regular season, all HNIC games began colour broadcasting during the 1967 Stanley Cup playoffs. From 1965 through 1976, HNIC also produced and broadcast a Wednesday-night game on CTV (the CBC's privately owned competitor); the midweek games began to be broadcast by local stations during the 1976–77 NHL season.

The Vancouver Canucks joined the NHL in 1970–71, increasing the number of HNIC venues from two to three. During the 1979–80 and 1980–81 seasons, four more Canadian teams (the Edmonton Oilers, Quebec Nordiques, Winnipeg Jets, and Calgary Flames) joined the NHL or relocated from the United States. The Oilers and Flames were featured frequently, since the teams were playoff contenders during the 1980s. The Nordiques, owned by Carling O'Keefe (a rival of HNIC sponsor Molson) with a small Anglophone fan base, were never broadcast from Quebec City during the regular season.

The CBC announced before the preliminary round of the 1976 playoffs that they would not televise any preliminary-round games, and the rights were sold back to the individual Canadian teams. Since Montreal earned a bye into the quarterfinals, this impacted Toronto and Vancouver's television coverage. While CHCH and CITY televised all three games of the Toronto-Pittsburgh series (with Bill Hewitt and Brian McFarlane), CHAN picked up the Vancouver-New York Islanders series. Game 1 of the Philadelphia-Toronto playoff series was televised locally to Southern Ontario by CHCH. Game 1 of the 1977 Pittsburgh-Toronto playoff series was seen regionally in southern Ontario on Hamilton's CHCH.

During the 1978 playoffs, the NHL Network began simulcasting many games with Hockey Night in Canada. Dan Kelly, the NHL Network's lead play-by-play announcer, covered play-by-play with HNIC's colour commentators; in Game 7 of the quarterfinal series between the Toronto Maple Leafs and New York Islanders on April 29, 1978, Kelly teamed up with Brian McFarlane. The 1978 Stanley Cup Final between the Montreal Canadiens and Boston Bruins and the 1979 Stanley Cup Final between the Montreal Canadiens and New York Rangers were also simulcast.

==== 1980s and 1990s ====
On April 9, 1980, the CBC carried the ACTRA Awards ceremony. Game two of the Hartford–Montreal playoff series was televised in French and the Edmonton-Philadelphia and Toronto-Minnesota games were shown only on local stations CITV in Edmonton and CHCH in Hamilton, respectively. The Vancouver-Buffalo game was televised by the CBC regionally in British Columbia, since the ACTRA Awards show was tape-delayed into prime time on the west coast.

Except for the 1982 Stanley Cup Final, the CBC's only other nationally televised postseason games that year were the April 23 Boston-Quebec game (Game 6), the April 25 Quebec-Boston game (Game 7), and the May 6 Vancouver-Chicago game (Game five). All the other games were seen regionally.

CTV had the national rights for the 1986 Calgary-St. Louis playoff series, except in the Calgary market (in which the CBC and Molson retained exclusive rights). CTV was unable to televise Games two and three of this series due to prior commitments. The CBC was allowed to televise Games two and three to Alberta and British Columbia, but not nationally.

On April 18, 1988 (during game one of the Montreal–Boston playoff series) at 8:08 p.m. local time, Quebec experienced a power outage. Darkness enveloped Montreal and the Forum; the Forum's reserve generators could only illuminate the rink enough to keep the game moving, and the CBC abandoned its coverage after the first period. Chris Cuthbert was assigned by the CBC to report and provide updates on Game 1 of the Washington-New Jersey playoff series. When Quebec blacked out, the CBC tasked Cuthbert with working the rest of the game. In Boston, WSBK-TV lost the picture but continued audio of the game with Fred Cusick and Derek Sanderson by telephone. In 1988 playoffs, two series involving Edmonton Oilers had unique arrangements. In the first round, TSN aired the Edmonton-Winnipeg playoff series nationally under the Carling O'Keefe banner, except for Edmonton and Winnipeg markets where CBC retained exclusive rights through Molson exclusivity. In the second round, Canwest/Global aired the 1988 Calgary-Edmonton playoff series nationally, except for the Edmonton and Calgary markets (where the CBC retained exclusive rights).

After Wayne Gretzky was traded to the Los Angeles Kings in 1988, the network began showing occasional double-headers when Canadian teams visited Los Angeles to showcase the sport's most popular player. The games were often joined in progress, since the start time for HNIC was still 8 p.m. ET, while Gretzky's Kings home games began at 7:30 p.m. Pacific (10:30 p.m. ET). Weekly double-headers became permanent during the 1994–95 season, with games starting at 7:30 p.m. ET (4:30 p.m. PT) and 7:30 p.m. PT (10:30 p.m. ET), respectively. The start times were moved up to 7 p.m. ET (4 p.m. ET) and PT (10 p.m. ET) in 1998, with a 30-minute pre-game show airing at 6:30 p.m. ET (3:30 p.m. PT).

Paul Graham was the senior producer of Hockey Night in Canada from 1998 until 2009.

==== 2000–2014 ====
Olympic women's ice hockey champion Cassie Campbell joined Hockey Night in Canada in 2006 as a rink-side reporter, becoming (on October 14, 2006) the first female colour commentator on an HNIC broadcast. Campbell substituted when Harry Neale was snowed in at his home in Buffalo. (Helen Hutchinson was the first woman to appear on HNIC telecasts in 1974, when she conducted between-period interviews on the Wednesday night CTV telecasts.)

Trevor Pilling became HNIC executive producer on July 23, 2010, replacing Sherali Najak. In September 2012, Steve Sloan and Joel Darling became the show's executive producers when Pilling became the head of CBC Sports programming.

The CBC's deal with the NHL ran through the 2013–14 season, and was replaced in 2014–15 by a sublicensing deal with Rogers Communications. The deal included over-the-air broadcasts of games on the CBC Television network and digital broadcasts on CBCSports.ca. It was reached after controversy during the 2006–07 NHL season, when private broadcaster CTVglobemedia tried to acquire exclusive Canadian distribution rights to the NHL for its own networks (including broadcast network CTV and cable channels TSN and RDS).

The CBC also produced Hockey Night in Canada Radio, a daily radio program which premiered on October 1, 2007, on Sirius Satellite Radio channel 122 (also known as Sports Play-by-Play 1). Although the broadcaster called HNIC Radio a return "back to the radio airwaves" for HNIC, HNIC Radio was an NHL-oriented talk show with appearances by HNIC hosts and commentators; it did not cover games. After the merger of Sirius Satellite Radio and XM Satellite Radio, the show moved to NHL Network Radio (Sirius channel 207 and XM channel 211). Rogers did not take over national radio rights to the NHL until the 2015–16 season, but the CBC ended production of HNIC Radio for the 2014–15 season due to high production costs and conflicts with Rogers.

=== 2014: Rogers takeover ===
We close tonight with what I said back in '87, [my] first time around at the helm of this broadcast, "Here's to an endless summer, and here's to an early fall ..." We will leave you congratulating the Los Angeles Kings with the music of Queen, and [we] bid you a good Hockey Night, for now.

— Ron MacLean, closing the last CBC-produced Hockey Night in Canada broadcast (June 13, 2014)

Negotiating a new contract with the CBC, NHL commissioner Gary Bettman reportedly recognized the broadcaster's financial difficulties and offered a smaller package which would have consisted of a national doubleheader on Saturday nights (as opposed to regional coverage of multiple games), reduced playoff coverage, and the loss of digital rights and the All-Star Game. Rights to the remaining properties not covered under the CBC contract would have been offered to other broadcasters. However, CBC Sports' staff (including executive director Jeffrey Orridge) continued to insist on exclusivity for every Saturday-night game involving Canadian teams. The CBC was unable to reach a deal; the league reportedly aimed for its next round of Canadian television contracts to have a total value of at least $3.2 billion. BCE (owners of Bell Media and previous cable rights-holder TSN) bid for sole national rights to the NHL, and attempted to contact the CBC about a partnership; the CBC Sports staff did not respond. Rogers Communications also made a bid of its own.

On November 26, 2013, the NHL announced a 12-year deal with Rogers for exclusive Canadian television and digital media rights to all NHL broadcasts beginning with the 2014–15 season; the deal was valued at $5.2 billion, twice as much as what NBC paid for its 2011 long-term contract with the league. The CBC sub-licensed a package of games from Rogers, allowing the network to continue airing Hockey Night in Canada for at least the first four seasons of the agreement (2014–15 through 2017–18). The last CBC-produced Hockey Night broadcast aired on June 13, 2014, when the Los Angeles Kings clinched the Stanley Cup in a four-games-to-one final series over the New York Rangers, ending with a montage set to Queen's "The Show Must Go On" which included season and playoff highlights interspersed with images and sounds from the CBC's six decades of NHL coverage.

The new season had a significant change in format for Hockey Night, with games no longer split by region. The CBC was joined by Rogers' over-the-air Citytv network, the Sportsnet family of specialty channels and (initially) FX Canada, who aired other games nationally with the CBC and shared the Hockey Night in Canada brand. Decisions on network assignments for the games were made on a week-by-week basis, ensuring that viewers have live on-air access to every Hockey Night game. The CBC continued to cover the NHL All-Star Game, Stanley Cup playoffs and Stanley Cup Final, with the latter simulcast on a Rogers network if needed. The NHL Winter Classic aired in 2015 on the CBC, moving to Sportsnet the following year.

The CBC did not pay any rights fees to Rogers or the NHL, but Rogers assumed responsibility for production and advertising sales. Promotions for CBC programs are included on CBC simulcasts; Rogers paid the corporation for CBC production staff and rent for offices and Studio 41 of the Canadian Broadcasting Centre for Hockey Night and Sportsnet coverage. Hockey Night in Canada was a financial boon for CBC Television, which received half of its total estimated advertising revenue from the broadcasts. To assign responsibility for televised content, compliance with regulatory guidelines and advertising to Rogers, the HNIC broadcasts are broadcast on a part-time television network owned by Rogers' Sportsnet subsidiary and affiliated with the CBC's English-language television stations (although CBC Television branding and continuity were still used on air). A licence for the arrangement was approved by the Canadian Radio-television and Telecommunications Commission in April 2015.

The loss of NHL rights accompanied other reductions in CBC funding and revenue, leading the corporation to cut its budget, staff, and programming. In April 2014, the CBC decided not to compete for NHL or other professional-sports broadcast rights. Among staff members laid off were the advertising sales staff who handled Hockey Night. In an internal staff notification of the Rogers deal, CBC president Hubert T. Lacroix wrote that the arrangement with Rogers "may not be the ideal scenario" for the CBC but the network would have suffered a major blow to its prestige if it was excluded from NHL broadcasts. Lacroix said that the deal "is the right outcome for Canadian hockey fans", allowing Hockey Night in Canada to remain on the CBC for a wider audience at a low cost before the 2015 Pan-American Games and 2016 Summer Olympics (whose broadcast rights were owned by the broadcaster). CBC staff called the agreement as a "structured exit" from NHL coverage if Rogers did not extend it.

Rogers' Hockey Night was initially guided by Scott Moore, appointed Rogers Media president of Sportsnet and NHL properties in January 2014; Moore, with Rogers Media since 2010, was a former CBC Sports president. Rogers reviewed on-air content and production of games and ancillary content, including announcers and other personnel. Hockey Night's new look was revealed on March 10, 2014, when CBC personality George Stroumboulopoulos became studio host of Hockey Night and Citytv's Sunday night Hometown Hockey package with Sportsnet's Daren Millard and Jeff Marek. Stroumboulopoulos, an alumnus of Toronto sports radio station CJCL and host of a CBC talk show, was seen as an effort by Rogers to expand Hockey Night's appeal to a younger demographic.

Although Ron MacLean ceded hosting Hockey Night to Stroumboulopoulos, he remained with Don Cherry on the Coach's Corner segment and was the on-location host of Sportsnet's Hometown Hockey games. Cherry, called "iconic" by Rogers president Keith Pelley, remained under contract to the CBC until he was released on November 11, 2019. Several other CBC Hockey Night veterans continued in roles with HNIC and Rogers' NHL coverage, including game announcers Jim Hughson (who retired in 2021) and Bob Cole (who retired in 2019); reporters Elliotte Friedman, Scott Oake, and Cassie Campbell-Pascall; and analysts Glenn Healy, Kelly Hrudey, Craig Simpson, Garry Galley, and P. J. Stock. New hires included game announcers Dave Randorf and Paul Romanuk.

The CBC-Rogers agreement reduced the CBC's advertising revenue, which fell by 37 percent in the last quarter of 2014 from the previous year. Industry analysts reported that, despite the agreement's increased promotion of other CBC programming, the corporation might lose more advertising revenue during the Stanley Cup playoffs.

==== 2016–2026 ====
In June 2016, Rogers announced that George Stroumboulopoulos was leaving Sportsnet. Ron MacLean was reinstated as the studio host of Hockey Night's early game, in addition to his on-location role on Hometown Hockey. David Amber was the late-game studio host.

Bob Cole retired in April 2019, after calling a limited schedule for his final season. Don Cherry was fired after a November 9 incident during his "Coach's Corner" segment over comments reprimanding Canadian immigrants for not wearing Remembrance Day poppies. On June 5, 2020, Sportsnet announced that it had hired TSN commentator and former Hockey Night in Canada broadcaster Chris Cuthbert. Jim Hughson retired before the 2021–22 season.

On April 2, 2025, Rogers announced that it had renewed its NHL broadcast rights for 12 additional years beginning in the 2026–27 NHL season; it was not yet confirmed if any of Rogers' sublicensing agreements would be renewed, with NHL commissioner Gary Bettman stating that he was "certain that our friends at Rogers will make the right decisions and have the right discussions with the people at CBC."

=== 2026–present: End of NHL broadcasts, PWHL partnership ===
On June 16, 2026, the CBC and Rogers announced that they had mutually decided to not renew the sublicensing agreement for Hockey Night, marking the end of NHL coverage on CBC Television after 74 years. The move faced criticism for removing Canadians' free access to Saturday night hockey (the CBC broadcast was freely available over-the-air or on the CBC's app, in contrast to Sportsnet, which is only available via a cable package or paid streaming subscription), viewed as a significant cultural institution in Canada, though others called the change "inevitable" and referred to the program as "a cultural relic from a bygone era".

Sportsnet replaced Hockey Night in Canada with Rogers Saturday Night Hockey as its flagship weekly broadcast in the 2026–27 season, airing a nationally-televised doubleheader featuring at least one Canadian team in each game, and carrying over hosts such as MacLean and Friedman. In October 2026, the CBC launched CBC Sports Primetime as a new block to fill the Hockey Night time slot, which carries various sporting events highlighting Canadian athletes and Olympic sports (with its inaugural month featuring coverage of sports such as cricket, curling, figure skating, and speed skating). The CBC's head of public affairs Chuck Thompson did not rule out future use of the HNIC brand in "new ways" going forward.

On September 28, 2026, the CBC announced that it would broadcast a package of eight Professional Women's Hockey League (PWHL) games on Saturday nights during the 2026–27 season as part of CBC Sports Primetime, and that it would revive the Hockey Night in Canada branding for these games. These games are part of an overall package of 26 games to be televised by CBC during the 2026–27 season.

The broadcasts are scheduled to begin on December 5, with the defending Walter Cup champion Montreal Victoire hosting the Hamilton Havoc. On November 12, 2026, CBC announced that Andi Petrillo would host the broadcasts alongside studio analysts Cassie Campbell-Pascall and Hailey Salvian of The Athletic, with Daniella Ponticelli and Becky Kellar as commentators and Rob Pizzo as rinkside reporter. Campbell-Pascall and Pizzo had previously worked Hockey Night broadcasts while it covered the NHL. The games will feature new theme music, and adopt an updated version of the original Hockey Night stick and puck logo used until 1998.

2026–27 scheduled games
Date	Matchup
December 5, 2026	Hamilton vs. Montreal
December 12, 2026	Boston vs. Toronto
December 26, 2026	Toronto vs. Hamilton
January 2, 2027	New York vs. Vancouver
January 23, 2027	Minnesota vs. Vancouver
February 20, 2027	Seattle vs. Toronto
February 27, 2027	Vancouver vs. Boston
April 3, 2027	Detroit vs. Montreal

== NHL coverage overview ==
The original Hockey Night in Canada logo, used until 1998 on the CBC and 2004 on Radio-Canada

The logo used from 1998 to 2026

=== Regular season ===
==== Pre-game show ====
Hockey Night in Canada typically began at 6:30 p.m. Eastern time (a little more than 30 minutes before the first game's opening faceoff) with Hockey Central Saturday, a pre-game show. Ron MacLean hosted Hockey Central Saturday with analysts Kelly Hrudey, Elliotte Friedman, Kevin Bieksa, and Jennifer Botterill.

==== Game 1 ====
The first game of the Saturday night doubleheader typically originated in Eastern Canada, beginning at 7 p.m. ET (4 p.m. PT). Since 2021–22, Chris Cuthbert, Craig Simpson, and Kyle Bukauskas served as the lead broadcast team, primarily calling the CBC Toronto Maple Leafs broadcast. Other Eastern Canada games aired on Citytv were called by the secondary team of John Bartlett, Garry Galley, and Shawn Mackenzie. When three or more early games involve Canadian teams, Sportsnet used its regional announcers for those broadcasts. From 2008 to 2020, Jim Hughson was the lead play-by-play voice of Hockey Night in Canada until his retirement on September 21, 2021; Hughson only called national Vancouver Canucks home games during the previous season due to the COVID-19 pandemic. Before the 2014–15 season, additional games involving Canadian teams were split to air regionally on CBC stations; Winnipeg Jets games were often seen in Central Canada, and Ottawa Senators games were seen in the Ottawa area and Eastern Canada.

During the 2015–16 season, the second-most-important game (typically featuring either the Jets, the Senators or the Montreal Canadiens) was allocated to Citytv. Sportsnet also sometimes simulcast the CBC's or Citytv's featured games, and broadcasters (of teams) regionally contracted to Sportsnet as needed. Although second-tier games were shown on Citytv during the inaugural season, these games were later moved to Sportsnet (with Citytv sometimes airing all-U.S. games or simulcasting the CBC game) to encourage pay-television subscriptions.

Until the end of the first period on November 9, 2019, MacLean hosted "Coach's Corner"; the segment featured former NHL Coach of the Year Don Cherry. Cherry analyzed the first period(s) of the game(s) in progress, expressed his opinions about issues affecting the sport (or the league), and gave tips on various points of hockey; MacLean was Cherry's foil. "Coach's Corner" was followed by highlights of other evening games. MacLean also hosts "Saturday Headlines", the second-intermission segment, with Hrudey, Friedman, Bieska, and Botterill. The segment usually focuses on the previous week's NHL news, along with highlights and analysis of the games in progress.

Until November 9, 2019, after the "three stars" selection of the first game(s), and before the face-off of Game 2, MacLean and Cherry return to give updates on scores and highlights from around the league. The commentators for Game 2 preview the upcoming contest. Since then, the second-intermission crew return to give updates on scores and highlights from around the league.

==== Cherry's removal from Hockey Night in Canada and end of "Coach's Corner" ====
On the November 9, 2019 "Coach's Corner", Cherry suggested that Canadian immigrants benefit from the sacrifices of veterans without wearing remembrance poppies: "You people that come here ... you love our way of life, you love our milk and honey, at least you can pay a couple bucks for a poppy or something like that! These guys paid for your way of life that you enjoy in Canada! These guys paid the biggest price." The Royal Canadian Legion, Canada's poppy distributor, denounced Cherry's statement: "Mr. Cherry's personal opinion was hurtful, divisive and in no way condoned by the Legion." Sportsnet apologized for his remarks, stating that they were discriminatory and offensive and "do not represent our values and what we stand for as a network." His co-host, Ron MacLean, tweeted regret for giving a thumbs-up and for allowing Cherry to make the comments. The NHL released a statement on Cherry's comments: "The comments made last night were offensive and contrary to the values we believe in." Cherry later told the Toronto Sun that he would not apologize: "I have had my say."

The Canadian Broadcast Standards Council (CBSC) said that its internal systems was overloaded by a high number of complaints. Two days later, on November 11, Sportsnet president Bart Yabsley announced that Cherry had been fired: "Following further discussions with Don Cherry after Saturday night's broadcast, it has been decided it is the right time for him to immediately step down." Cherry said to a Toronto Sun reporter, "I know what I said and I meant it. Everybody in Canada should wear a poppy to honour our fallen soldiers ... I would have liked to continue doing 'Coach's Corner'. The problem is if I have to watch everything I say, it isn't 'Coach's Corner'". He later said that if he had to do it again, he would have said "everybody". The following Saturday, MacLean reflected on the incident during Hockey Night in Canada (his first without Cherry) and announced the end of "Coach's Corner".

==== Game 2 ====
The second game aired at 10 pm ET (7 pm PT, 8 pm MT) on the CBC and Sportsnet, originating from a Mountain or Pacific Time Zone city and usually featuring at least one of the Calgary Flames, Edmonton Oilers or Vancouver Canucks. Regular-season games rarely lasted longer than three hours since the introduction of quicker faceoffs, and every double-header game was seen in its entirety. Usually, there were either one or two games at that time; in that case, one of them airsed on CBC and the other aired on either Citytv or on other Sportsnet channels. There was only one instance where three games were played at this time; that date was November 28, 2015.

Beginning in 2024–25, for Western Canada games, Jack Michaels, Louie DeBrusk, and Scott Oake were the lead broadcast team, mainly calling games involving the Edmonton Oilers. From 2016 to 2022, David Amber took over from MacLean as host. Like the early games, when at least two Western Canadian teams played, Sportsnet assigned regional announcers to call the games. From 2012–13 until early in the 2019–20 season, the first intermission of Game 2 contained a short analysis segment with Ron MacLean and Don Cherry followed by "Inside the Game" and "Scoreboard Saturday" with highlights of earlier games.

Game 2 was followed on the CBC from 2000–01 to 2013–14 by After Hours, a post-game show hosted by Oake and DeBrusk from the game's arena. The program featured a wrap-up of the night's games and a lengthy interview with (and viewer questions to) a player or coach, usually from one of the game's teams. There were rare instances that CBC split two games regionally, in this window; this resulted most viewers seeing a game from Canadian venue (also serving as the site of After Hours for that telecast), while select others saw a game from an American venue. If CBC regionalized games at the 10 pm ET window, they could either air only two games nationally (1, 2 or 3 pm and 7 pm ET) or regionalize both of them at the 7 pm ET window (Game 1). After Hours was revived for 2016–17, and was shown on Sportsnet and the CBC.

Only on rare occasions did HNIC broadcast regular-season games involving two U.S.-based teams, and this was usually due to exceptional circumstances. Special occasions included Wayne Gretzky's final game in 1999 (which actually took place on a Sunday afternoon), the retirement of Steve Yzerman's jersey in 2007, Sidney Crosby's comeback game in Pittsburgh against the New York Islanders in 2011, and early editions of the league's major outdoor games (such as the Winter Classic). However, due to their decline in popularity, outdoor games were no longer shown on the CBC or branded HNIC unless a Canadian team was involved. The last one to air on CBC was the 2015 NHL Winter Classic (outside of the Saturday doubleheader) and the 2015 NHL Stadium Series (overall).

=== Hockey Night in Canada Replay ===
When CBC became a 24-hour public network in 2006 and until the Rogers takeover starting with the 2014–15 NHL season, CBC replayed two games (Game 1, airing on most CBC stations, and Game 2, a national game [except for four occasions in the 2013–14 NHL season where it showed the game airing on most signals]) condensed into one-hour telecasts, in a two-hour block dubbed Hockey Night in Canada Replay (abbreviated as HNiC Replay). It followed the conclusion of After Hours on CBC, except on CBC Vancouver, where it instead televised CBC News Vancouver Saturday at 10 pm PT.

From 2007 to 2014, CBC replayed three games, only on the annual Hockey Day in Canada with Game 1 at 1AM ET, Game 2 at 2AM ET and Game 3 at 3AM ET.

On February 8, 2014; CBC didn't air HNIC Replay as it was airing late-night coverage of the 2014 Winter Olympics from Sochi, Russia.

=== Playoffs ===
The CBC provided extensive Stanley Cup playoff coverage every spring (focusing on Canadian teams), and had exclusive English-language rights to the Stanley Cup Finals. Its playoff coverage and rights to the finals continued under the Rogers sublicensing agreement, with coverage shared with Sportsnet and all Canadian-based teams' series being shown on CBC. Due to rights agreements with Rogers, playoff games were not available to livestream on the CBC Gem or CBC Sports online platforms, even if the broadcast aired on CBC Television.

==== Stanley Cup Finals ====
In 1972, Hockey Night in Canada moved playoff coverage from the CBC to CTV to avoid a lengthy NABET strike against the CBC. Bob Cole, Dan Kelly and Jim Robson shared the play-by-play for the CBC's 1980 coverage.

In 1986, the CBC televised games one and two of the Stanley Cup Final in Montreal and Calgary; it televised games three, four and five nationally. When CTV televised games one and two, both games were blacked out in Montreal and Calgary.

The first game four (May 24) of the 1988 Stanley Cup Final was hampered by fog before a power outage caused its cancellation with the Edmonton Oilers and Boston Bruins tied, 3–3. The CBC televised that game and the "official" fourth game (on May 26), which the Oilers won 6–3.

=== Hockey Day in Canada ===
Beginning in 2000, the CBC aired an annual Hockey Day in Canada to celebrate the game. The afternoon broadcast of hockey-related features leads up to a triple-header of NHL games with the seven Canadian teams: the Calgary Flames, Edmonton Oilers, Montreal Canadiens, Ottawa Senators, Toronto Maple Leafs, Vancouver Canucks, and Winnipeg Jets. The 2008 edition featured four games which included two American teams (Detroit and Colorado) with the six Canadian teams, due to the NHL's schedule format. COVID-19 travel restrictions in 2021 led to the Edmonton Oilers missing out; seven teams (an odd number) were in the temporary North Division.

The broadcast includes live segments from smaller communities across the country, and features panel discussions on issues facing "Canada's game" at the amateur and professional levels. Usually telecast on a Saturday in mid-February early in the show's history, it was shown in January due to the Winter Olympics in 2002, 2006, 2010, 2014, and 2018. From 2022 until 2026, the event aired in mid-to-late January to accommodate the 2022 and 2026 Winter Olympics, as well as the 4 Nations Face-Off in 2025; the 2007 event was also held in January.

Hockey Day in Canada included world-record all-night pick-up games from Red Deer, Alberta (in 2001) and Windsor, Nova Scotia (2002). Viewers saw the games, without commentary, after the CBC ended regular programming for the night.

HDIC continued under the Rogers agreement, with Scotiabank the sponsor. When Sportsnet also held national broadcast rights to the Canadian Hockey League, the 2015 edition included a prime-time Quebec Major Junior Hockey League (QMJHL) game between the hosting Halifax Mooseheads and the Cape Breton Screaming Eagles. After losing the CHL rights, Sportsnet still continued to incorporate CHL interviews and highlights within the show, such as content from WHL games (Victoria Royals) in 2024 and QMJHL games (Moncton Wildcats) in 2026, as well as other junior hockey leagues like the AJHL (Canmore Eagles) in 2025. In its final years the show also incorporated coverage of women's hockey with the inclusion of off-site PWHL or on-site women's USport games

==== Broadcast locations ====
- 2000: Toronto, Ontario (February 19)
- 2001: Red Deer, Alberta (February 24)
- 2002: Windsor, Nova Scotia (January 5)
- 2003: Iqaluit, Nunavut (February 15)
- 2004 (5th edition): Shaunavon, Saskatchewan (February 21)
- 2005: No broadcast, due to the 2004–05 NHL lockout
- 2006: Stephenville, Newfoundland and Labrador (January 7)
- 2007: Nelson, British Columbia (January 13)
- 2008: Winkler, Manitoba (February 9)
- 2009: Campbellton, New Brunswick (February 21)
- 2010 (10th edition): Stratford, Ontario (January 30)
- 2011: Whitehorse, Yukon (February 12)
- 2012: Prince Edward Island (February 11)
- 2013: Peterborough, Ontario (February 9)
- 2014 (Final edition covered by CBC Sports): Lloydminster, Alberta/Saskatchewan (January 18)
- 2015 (15th edition, first one covered by Rogers: Halifax, Nova Scotia (February 14)
- 2016: Kamloops, British Columbia (February 6)
- 2017: Kenora, Ontario (February 18)
- 2018: Corner Brook, Newfoundland and Labrador (January 20)
- 2019 (5th edition covered by Rogers): Swift Current, Saskatchewan (February 9)
- 2020 (20th edition): Yellowknife, Northwest Territories (February 8)
- 2021: Canada (February 13 – Not site-specific due to the pandemic)
- 2022: Scarborough, Ontario (January 29)
- 2023: Owen Sound, Ontario (January 21)
- 2024 (10th edition covered by Rogers): Victoria, British Columbia (January 20)
- 2025 (25th edition): Canmore, Alberta (January 18)
- 2026 (Final Edition of NHL coverage covered by Rogers): Moncton, New Brunswick (January 17)

When the 2005 edition was cancelled, TSN aired Hockey Lives Here: Canada's Game. The telecast, based at the World Pond Hockey Championships in Plaster Rock, New Brunswick, featured NHL players playing an exhibition game to raise money for charities in Hamilton, Ontario.

Team Records on Hockey Day
Team	W	L	T	OTL
Calgary Flames	11	8	1	4
Edmonton Oilers	9	11	0	3
Montreal Canadiens	12	10	0	2
Ottawa Senators	11	11	0	2
Toronto Maple Leafs	12	9	0	4
Vancouver Canucks	13	7	1	3
Winnipeg Jets	10	3	0	1
Anaheim Ducks	1	0	0	0
Boston Bruins	2	0	0	0
Chicago Blackhawks	0	1	0	0
Colorado Avalanche	1	1	0	0
Detroit Red Wings	1	1	0	2
Nashville Predators	0	1	0	0
New York Islanders	0	1	0	0
New York Rangers	1	0	0	0
Pittsburgh Penguins	1	0	0	0
San Jose Sharks	1	0	0	0
St. Louis Blues	0	1	0	0
Tampa Bay Lightning	0	1	0	0

=== Lockout programming ===
The CBC replaced Hockey Night in Canada with Movie Night in Canada, a block of Saturday-night movies hosted by Ron MacLean from junior-hockey venues, during the 2004–05 NHL lockout. A labour agreement was reached for the 2005–06 NHL season. Movie Night in Canada was revived in 2020, when league play was suspended by the COVID-19 pandemic. During the 1994–95 and 2012–13 lockouts, the CBC aired classic Hockey Night in Canada games.

=== Other languages ===
Hockey Night in Canada occasionally aired alternate broadcasts of games in Canada's minority languages, primarily as part of Hockey Day in Canada. HDIC simulcast a 2007 game between the Toronto Maple Leafs and Vancouver Canucks on the TLN cable channel in Italian, with features and commentary by soccer host Alf De Blasis. It televised a 2010 game in the Inuit language Inuktitut, with commentary by CBC North's Charlie Panigoniak and Annie Ford, and games have been presented in Cree, Hindi, Punjabi, Tagalog, Mandarin Chinese and Cantonese.

The CBC broadcast one series per round during the 2008 Stanley Cup playoffs in Mandarin, and added a regular-season schedule of games in Punjabi (Canada's third- and fifth-most-spoken languages, after English and French) on the network's website and some cable and satellite providers. It suspended the Punjabi broadcasts just before the 2010–11 season, but coverage was restored for the 2013 season with a new sponsorship deal.

With the transition to the Rogers contract, the Punjabi broadcasts moved to Rogers' multicultural Omni Television stations as Hockey Night in Canada: Punjabi Edition. Rogers cancelled the Punjabi Edition of Hockey Night in 2026, citing unsustainable audience levels.

Harnarayan Singh's Punjabi call of the game-winning Pittsburgh Penguins goal by Nick Bonino during the first game of the 2016 Stanley Cup Final went viral. Penguins head coach Mike Sullivan, who showed footage of the call to the team as part of a video recap before game two, called it "entertaining". Singh was invited to Pittsburgh to join the Penguins' Stanley Cup celebrations. On November 30, 2016, Singh began to also participate in English-language broadcasts for Sportsnet.

In 2022, the Aboriginal Peoples Television Network (APTN) began to air a package of selected Hockey Night in Canada games in Cree; the network had previously sub-licensed a package of games from the former Hometown Hockey package in 2019. In 2025, the channel also added Inuktitut broadcasts.

==== French ====
The CBC's French sister network, Ici Radio-Canada Télé (then known as Télévision de Radio-Canada), aired La Soirée du hockey with Montreal Canadiens games on Saturday evenings. The network had also aired Quebec Nordiques and Ottawa Senators games occasionally during the regular season (if the Canadiens were not playing that night) and the Stanley Cup Final.

During the 2002–03 season, RDS secured exclusive French-language rights to the NHL. The deal, negotiated with the Canadiens rather than the NHL, was meant to ensure a consistent home for all Canadiens games. Radio-Canada did not bid for the rights, saying that it could not devote so much airtime to hockey. The announcement angered Heritage Minister Sheila Copps, who suggested that the network was violating its licence conditions by not airing La Soirée du hockey. When Radio-Canada carried La Soirée du hockey, play-by-play announcers included René Lecavalier, Richard Garneau, and Claude Quenneville.

Radio-Canada reached an agreement to produce the Saturday-night games as La Soirée du hockey, simulcast on Radio-Canada and RDS. The agreement was terminated after the 2004 playoffs, but the RDS-produced replacement (Le Hockey du samedi soir) continued to be simulcast on Radio-Canada outside Quebec – where RDS has limited distribution – through the 2005–06 season. Radio-Canada stopped simulcasting RDS broadcasts in 2006–07, and Rogers sold the French-language rights to TVA Sports.

== Availability outside Canada ==
When HNIC was on radio, it was broadcast over several powerful CBC clear-channel stations whose nighttime signals reached much of the northern United States; the games had a following in Boston, Chicago, Detroit, and New York, which also had NHL teams at the time. Foster Hewitt acknowledged the listeners in his opening greeting, "Hello Canada, and hockey fans in the United States and Newfoundland" (before Newfoundland joined Canada in 1949; the line was immortalized in the opening montage of modern Hockey Night telecasts). This continued into the television era, waning in recent years with the expansion of local-team TV coverage on regional sports networks; some C-band satellite dishes, however, can still receive CBC over-the-air feeds. U.S. cable television outlets near the international border (including Metro Detroit, Seattle, Buffalo, Burlington, Vermont and Sault Ste. Marie, Michigan) typically carry a nearby CBC affiliate on their systems, although some systems carry a non-regional station). CBC stations are generally carried within about 150 mi (240 km) of the border, and are not blacked out.

During the 2008–09 season, Hockey Night's main games were simulcast weekly in the United States on NHL Network with pre- and post-game shows. If U.S.-based teams appear in these games, the telecast was blacked out in the markets of the participating teams or was televised by the U.S. team's local broadcaster. During the 2009–10 season, only the first game of the HNIC doubleheader was simulcast live on NHL Network; the second game and the post-game After Hours program was shown Sunday on tape delay; the only exception was Hockey Day in Canada. Since the Rogers takeover, HNIC on NHL Network carries games regardless of broadcaster (the CBC or a Rogers network).

NHL Center Ice offers some Hockey Night in Canada games at the same time as the CBC broadcast, usually regional Hockey Night games from Ottawa or Montreal. Center Ice generally shows the 7 p.m. ET games, because the late games are usually national.

From 2006 to 2021, the NBC networks (originally OLN and Versus) simulcast CBC coverage of some games (generally first- and second-round matchups from Western Canada) instead of using their own crews and announcers. During the early 1990s, SportsChannel America similarly covered the Stanley Cup playoffs. Versus and NBCSN, its later incarnation, continued to use CBC and Sportsnet feeds to augment its own playoff coverage. All regular season games broadcast under the HNIC brand not on NHL Network are now available on ESPN+ (in tandem with regional feeds involving games with U.S.-based teams), as part of parent company ESPN's 7-year agreement with the NHL. Blackout restrictions will apply for all games.

Hockey Night in Canada was also broadcast live (and occasionally as-live) in the United Kingdom and Ireland on Viaplay. Although the pre- and post-game segments are not included, both games and the segments between periods are shown. Hockey Night in Canada was also seen in other European markets on ESPN America, distributed on cable and satellite platforms until 2013 (when ESPN America closed) Hockey Night in Canada was then broadcast in the UK and Ireland on Premier Sports now (Viaplay Sports in the UK). Until its closure in 2014, Canadian Forces Radio and Television rebroadcast HNIC games to Canadian Forces members overseas.

== Announcers ==
Foster Hewitt, who welcomed Canadians to the radio broadcast each week, demonstrated that his style could also work on television in 1952. Hewitt continued to work in television for many years (including the 1972 Summit Series between Canada and the Soviet national team), and his style of play-by-play announcing remained the same on television as it was on radio. Hewitt was followed by Danny Gallivan, Hewitt's son, Bill Hewitt, Dan Kelly, Bob Cole, Dick Irvin Jr., Jim Robson, and Jim Hughson. Previous show hosts included Wes McKnight, Ward Cornell, Frank Selke Jr., Jack Dennett, Dan Kelly, Ted Darling, Dave Hodge, Brian McFarlane, Don Cherry, Dick Irvin Jr., and George Stroumboulopoulos.

Ron MacLean hosted the NHL broadcasts from the 1986–87 to 2013–14 season, and again from 2016–17 until 2026. During the program's later NHL seasons, its play-by-play announcers included Chris Cuthbert, John Bartlett, Jack Michaels and Harnarayan Singh, with colour commentary from Craig Simpson, Garry Galley and Louie DeBrusk. Kyle Bukauskas, Shawn McKenzie and Scott Oake worked as reporters and hosts.

On June 5, 2020, Sportsnet announced that it had hired TSN commentator and former Hockey Night in Canada broadcaster Chris Cuthbert. Cuthbert joined HNIC in time for the NHL post-COVID return, calling games from Edmonton. Dave Randorf's contract was not renewed, and he joined the Tampa Bay Lightning as their play-by-play announcer. Hughson announced his retirement after the 2020–21 season, and Cuthbert assumed the lead play-by-play role.

For the PWHL broadcasts scheduled to begin in December 2026, Andi Petrillo was named host, with Cassie Campbell-Pascall and Hailey Salvian as studio analysts. Daniella Ponticelli was appointed play-by-play announcer, alongside colour commentator Becky Kellar and rinkside reporter Rob Pizzo.

== Theme music ==
=== 1952–1968 ===
The television show's original theme song was "Saturday's Game", a march composed by Howard Cable. The CBC and MacLaren Advertising, the advertising agency responsible for the broadcasts at the time, later replaced it with the "Esso Happy Motoring Song".

=== 1968–2008: The Hockey Theme ===
The companies commissioned "The Hockey Theme", composed in 1968 by Dolores Claman and orchestrated by Jerry Toth. The CBC's most recent licence to use "The Hockey Theme" expired at the conclusion of the 2007–08 NHL season. Claman's publisher issued a statement on June 4, 2008, that the CBC would not be renewing its rights to the composition. CBC Sports head Scott Moore denied the reports, saying that the CBC wanted to keep the song and that negotiations on a new licence agreement for the song were ongoing.

==== 2008: The CBC loses rights to "The Hockey Theme" ====
On June 6, 2008, the CBC announced that it could not reach an acceptable agreement to renew its licence. Rights to "The Hockey Theme" were picked up by CTV, which began using it for hockey broadcasts on its TSN and RDS sports channels during the 2008–09 season. (The theme was also featured during the closing ceremonies of the 2010 Olympic Winter Games, aired on CTV.) The CBC said that it had offered nearly $1 million for perpetual rights to Claman's theme, but Copyright Music was asking for $2.5 to $3 million. Copyright Music turned it down because it was " ... a settlement that barely covered our legal bills, let alone losses." One proposed payment method would have allowed the CBC to continue using the theme at a cost of $500 per play ($65,000 annually) while not giving the corporation ownership of the music. Despite being contacted by five parties interested in buying Claman's theme, "[Copyright Music] had no desire to start a bidding war."

Moore said, "We have no real idea why the deal fell apart. We're not sure why because the other side hasn't communicated with us." According to Copyright Music, Moore gave them an unrealistic deadline of 24 hours to meet him when his client was five time zones away.

Moore also said that he did not think Hockey Night in Canada would lose viewers if he lost the theme song: "Hockey's a game, not a song". Mike Myers disagreed with Moore's ambivalence towards the song, calling it " ... the second anthem [of Canada]" Canadian jazz-fusion band the Shuffle Demons jokingly introduced it as " ... [Canada's] national anthem" during performances. In a CBC-website poll asking, "Can Canada go on as we know it without the Hockey Night in Canada theme?", 84 percent said no.

=== Finding a new theme: Canada's Hockey Anthem Challenge ===
After the loss of "The Hockey Theme" to CTV, the CBC sponsored a nationwide search (powered by the Filemobile media platform) for a new theme in collaboration with the Nettwerk label. The contest began on June 10, 2008; by August 31, the end of the submissions period, the network received over 14,000 entries. They were reduced to five semi-finalists, whose themes were re-arranged by producer Bob Rock and presented for public voting:

1. "Ice Warriors" – Gerry Mosby
2. "Sticks to the Ice" – Robert Fraser Burke
3. "Eleventh Hour" – Graham McRae
4. "Let the Game Begin" – Christian St-Roch and Jimmy Tanaka
5. "Canadian Gold" – Colin Oberst

"Hockey Scores", one of the highest-rated submissions, was not chosen as a semi-finalist. Written by Logan Aubé of Aurora, Ontario, the song was described by the National Post as "an endearingly insane cacophony of screaming babies, screeching animals and gunshot blasts", and by The Globe and Mail as sounding "a lot like a baby riding an unco-operative sheep through an industrial grinder". Aubé originally posted the song on Something Awful, asking participants to vote for it on the CBC's contest website. "Hockey Scores" quickly became the most viewed and among the highest rated of the contest's submissions, though the CBC would not make the decision based on popularity alone.

Voting began on October 4, 2008, with two finalists picked for a final one-day vote.

==== October 11, 2008–2014: Canadian Gold arr. Oberst ====
The two finalists—Burke's "Sticks to the Ice" and Oberst's "Canadian Gold"—were announced on October 9, 2008. On October 11, after a final round of voting, "Canadian Gold" was announced by Don Cherry on Scotiabank Hockey Tonight as the new HNIC theme. Oberst received $100,000 plus 50 percent of the song's royalties, the other half of which would be donated to minor hockey. The CBC received exclusive rights to the song for three years, and renewed its rights for the 2011–2012 season.

==== 2014–2026: Canadian Gold arr. Herberman ====
A re-orchestrated version of the theme was introduced for the 2014–15 season amid the program's move to Sportsnet, arranged and orchestrated by John Herberman and recorded in Toronto by a 50-piece orchestra. Herberman also created an extensive library of new stings and bumpers derived from the main theme.

== Awards ==
Hockey Night in Canada received four Gemini Awards from six nominations, mostly for Ron MacLean:

- 1992: Best Sports Broadcaster: Ron MacLean
- 1994: Best Sports Broadcaster: Ron MacLean
- 2004: Best Host or Interviewer in a Sports Program or Sportscast: Ron MacLean
  - Best Sports Program or Series: Joel Darling, Chris Irwin, Sherali Najak
- 2006: Best Host or Interviewer in a Sports Program or Sportscast: Ron MacLean

== Criticism ==
=== Programming ===
Critics of HNIC's programming allege that the program favours the Toronto Maple Leafs. The CBC did not air the March 11, 2006 pregame sweater-retirement ceremony for Canadiens legend (and slapshot inventor Bernard "Boom Boom" Geoffrion), continuing its planned broadcast of a Toronto Maple Leafs-Tampa Bay Lightning game; Geoffrion had died earlier in the day. The CBC devoted portions of its coverage to Geoffrion (including a pregame tribute and acknowledgements during the first intermission and on "Coach's Corner"), and the ceremony was broadcast in full by French-language outlets. A CBC spokesperson said that the network received a "handful" of complaints about the lack of coverage; if the broadcaster aired the ceremony in full, it would have preempted the Leafs game for 40 minutes. An Ottawa Citizen article considered the decision an example of perceived bias towards the Maple Leafs by the CBC, which did not want to "offend" their fans by not showing the full game.

=== Content ===
Criticism of HNIC's content often focused on Don Cherry, who made controversial statements during his live on-air segments. Cherry was criticized for insulting Québécois and European players, some of whom he called "soft". According to Cherry, Americans were ruining the NHL. Despite these controversies, Cherry's popularity among Canadians endured.

The Rogers-produced "Coach's Corner" was shortened from 10 minutes to five, which was criticized by Cherry and MacLean during the first segment of the new season. The following Monday, Scott Moore had a brief discussion with Cherry; he laughingly said, "If you have more to talk about, all you need to do is make sure you tell the executive producer what you want to talk about and we'll make sure you have lots of time."

Preceded by none	NHL English network broadcast partner in Canada; 1952 – 2026 with CTV (1984–1986) with Global/Canwest (1987–1988) sublicensed under Sportsnet (2014–2026) with Citytv (2014–2026)	Succeeded by none
