= A Place to Stand, a Place to Grow =

Unofficial provincial anthem of Ontario

"A Place to Stand, a Place to Grow" (Ontari-ari-ari-o!) is the unofficial provincial anthem of the Canadian province of Ontario. It was written as the signature tune for a movie of the same name that was featured at the Expo 67 Ontario pavilion.

The song was written by Dolores Claman, who also wrote "The Hockey Theme", with lyrics by Richard Morris and orchestrations by Jerry Toth. Lyrics for a French version were written by Larry Trudel.

It was commissioned by the Progressive Conservative government of John Robarts for the Ontario pavilion at Expo 67, the World's Fair held in Montreal, Quebec in Canada's centennial year of 1967, and was used again in the following decades.

The song was featured at the Province of Ontario's exhibit in the short film A Place to Stand, which won the 1967 Academy Award for Live Action Short Film. The Government of Ontario maintains three versions of the song, an English, French, and a bilingual version that incorporates both English and French.

== Cultural resonance ==
- In season 8 episode 6 of Mystery Science Theater 3000 titled "The Undead" from March 8th 1997 the character of Tom Servo portrayed by Kevin Murphy sings this song.
- In their early busking days, Barenaked Ladies would often perform this song, with their hometown of Scarborough, Ontario replacing Ontario.
- In 2004, Jim Carrey sang the song on Late Night with Conan O'Brien when the show travelled to Toronto to tape four episodes.
- An episode of Rick Mercer's Monday Report uses this song during a report on the massive grow-ops in Ontario.
- In 2017, the song was revived for a television commercial promoting provincial commemorations of the 150th anniversary of Canadian Confederation. With the tagline "A place for all of us", the ad was designed to reflect multiculturalism and diversity based on real-life experiences, including scenes of a Syrian refugee, an Ojibway father and his son, African-Canadian parents, and a gay couple.
- In February 2020, the Ontario government unveiled a new Ontario passenger licence plate, which contained the slogan "A Place to Grow". The licence plate design and slogan briefly replaced the previous license plate design and slogan, "Yours to Discover". However in May 2020, the new plates were discontinued after they were found to have visibility issues.
- The melody of the song's final refrain, "Ontari-ari-ari-o!", was used as an audio signature in television advertisements produced as part of the Government of Ontario's It's Happening Here advertising campaign. The advertisements, which aired during high-profile television timeslots, led to criticism of Premier Doug Ford's government for the campaign's cost to Ontario taxpayers and perceived partisan benefit.

== See also ==
- Canadian patriotic music
- Canada (1967 song)
