= Yeah, Whatever =

Studio album by Moev
- Released: 1988, 1989 (US CD release)
- Recorded: 1987–1988
- Genre: Electronic, industrial
- Length: 36:26
- Label: Nettwerk, Atlantic

Moev chronology
Dusk and Desire (1986)	Yeah, Whatever (1988)	Head Down (1990)

Yeah, Whatever is the third album by electronic music artist Moev released in 1988 . It was the first one to feature vocalist Dean Russell, whose obscure and uneasy lyrics made the record darker than the previous ones. It spawned a hit single "Crucify Me".

== Track listing ==
1. "Yeah, Whatever"
2. "Slide"
3. "Sentencing"
4. "Wanting"
5. "Crucify Me"
6. "Right Hand Of God"
7. "Open Mind"
8. "Capital Heaven"
9. "Yeah, Whatever" (12" version)
10. "Crucify Me" (12" version)
11. "Capital Heaven" (12" version)
12. "Wanting" (12" version)
