= Saturday Night Hockey =

Canadian National Hockey League television series

- Also known as: Rogers Saturday Night Hockey
- Genre: NHL hockey telecasts
- Created by: Rogers Media; Sportsnet
- Presented by: Ron MacLean
- Starring: Elliotte Friedman; Kevin Bieksa; Colby Armstrong
- Country of origin: Canada
- Original language: English

Production
- Production locations: Rogers Building, Toronto
- Camera setup: Multi-camera
- Running time: 180 minutes or until end of the game

Original release
- Network: Sportsnet
- Release: October 3, 2026 – present

Related
- Hockey Night in Canada (predecessor); Monday Night Hockey

Rogers Saturday Night Hockey is a Canadian television series featuring national broadcasts of National Hockey League (NHL) games. Produced and broadcast by Sportsnet, it premiered on October 3, 2026 as the successor to Sportsnet's Saturday-night broadcasts under the Hockey Night in Canada name.

Most of Hockey Night in Canada's production staff and on-air personnel have been retained. Saturday Night Hockey will be hosted by Ron MacLean, with Elliotte Friedman, Kevin Bieksa and Colby Armstrong serving as studio analysts. Each weekly broadcast will consist of an NHL doubleheader, with at least one Canadian team appearing in each game.

Saturday Night Hockey was announced as part of Sportsnet's expanded coverage for the 2026–27 NHL season. Sportsnet stated that its national schedule would include more than 550 games, an increase of 35 per cent over the previous season, following the removal of approximately 150 regional blackouts.

== Background ==
From 2014 through 2026, Sportsnet produced Saturday-night NHL broadcasts under the Hockey Night in Canada name through an agreement with the Canadian Broadcasting Corporation (CBC), which owns the trademark. The broadcasts appeared on CBC Television as well as Sportsnet and other Rogers-owned channels. CBC and Sportsnet did not renew their sublicensing agreement after the 2026 Stanley Cup playoffs, ending NHL broadcasts on CBC after the 2025–26 season. Sportsnet subsequently introduced Saturday Night Hockey as its new flagship Saturday-night series.

== See also ==
- NHL on Sportsnet
- List of Canadian television series
