= Howard Cable =

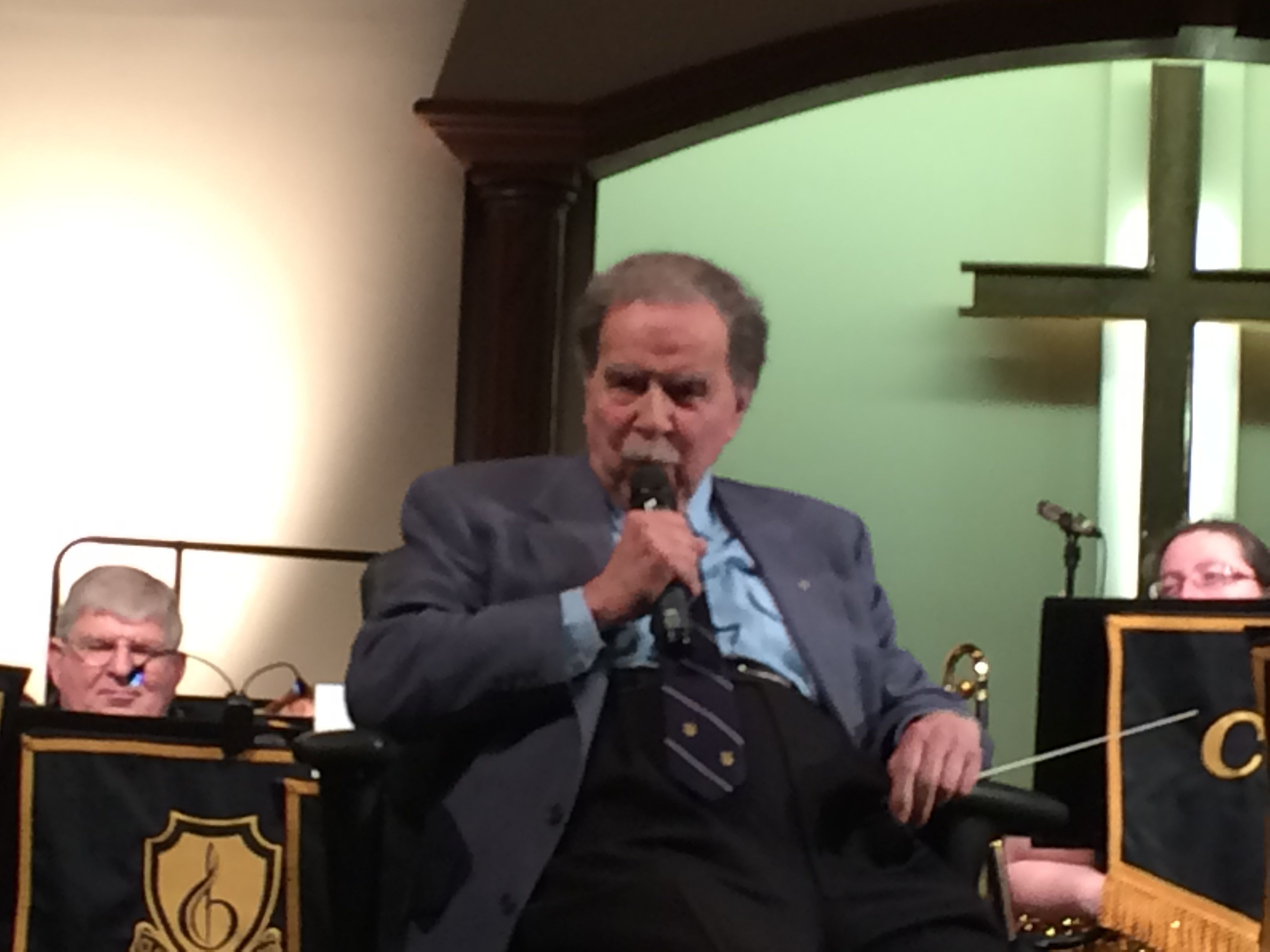
- Howard Reid Cable introduces the story behind McIntyre Ranch Country, before conducting it with the Clarington Concert Band at a concert in Oshawa, Ontario.

Background information
- Born: Howard Reid Cable; December 15, 1920; Toronto, Ontario
- Died: March 30, 2016 (aged 95)
- Genres: Classical
- Occupations: Conductor, composer
- Instruments: Piano, clarinet, oboe

Howard Reid Cable (December 15, 1920 – March 30, 2016) was a conductor, arranger, music director, composer, and radio and television producer. He was born in Toronto, Ontario, Canada.

== Biography ==
Cable received an Associate diploma (ATCM) from The Royal Conservatory of Music in Toronto in conducting and bandmastership 1939. He is also a recipient of an honorary Doctor of Fine Arts (DFA) degree from the University of Lethbridge in 2002. Cable studied piano, clarinet, and oboe, and played in the Parkdale Collegiate Institute orchestra under Leslie Bell. While leading a dance band, the Cavaliers, 1935-41 in Toronto and at southern Ontario summer resorts, he studied at the Toronto Conservatory of Music with Sir Ernest MacMillan, Ettore Mazzoleni, and Healey Willan. He also studied with John Weinzweig in 1945.

Cable composed and arranged the original theme for the Hockey Night in Canada television broadcast, Saturday's Game, which opened the broadcast from 1952 until 1968. His arrangement for solo piano of Dolores Claman's The Hockey Theme that was the show's theme from 1968 until the mid-2000s is one of the best selling pieces of sheet music in Canada. (Jerry Toth arranged the broadcast version of "The Hockey Theme".)

Cable was conductor for the early CBC TV variety programs General Electric Showtime and Mr. Show Business. In addition he conducted and arranged music for various CBC radio and TV programs in the 1960s. From 1971 to 1985 he was host of the program Howard Cable Presents heard on St. Catharines radio station "CHRE-fm", and for most of the years it was the station's highest rated program.

It was Howard Cable's longtime relationship with Canadian Brass that put him on the international stage through numerous recordings and radio appearances.

In 1999, he was made a Member of the Order of Canada in recognition of his "legendary contribution to the Canadian music industry".

== Musical works ==
=== Brass Quintet ===
- Agnus Dei
- Carnival of Venice
- Civil War Medley
- Concerto Op 4 No 6
- Contrapunctus No. 9
- Coranto Alarm
- Cum rides mihi
- D'ou viens-tu, bergere
- Data est de lachryis mihi voluptas
- First Nowell
- Flight of the Tuba [Bumble] Bee
- Greensleeves
- Holly and the Ivy
- Ida and Dottie
- Jig
- Jingle Bells
- Joker, The
- Joy to World
- It Came Upon a Midnight Clear
- La Cloche de Noel
- La Rose Nuptiale
- La Virgen de la Macarena
- Lassus Trombone
- Lo How a Rose e'er Blooming
- Maple Leaf Rag
- McIntyre Ranch Country
- Newfoundland Rhapsody
- Newfoundland Sketch
- Noël Nouvelet
- O Christmas Tree
- O Come All Ye Faithful
- O Little Town of Bethlehem
- Midnight Clear
- Perpetual Motion
- Point Pelee (Horn solo with, 2nd mvt to "Ontario Pictures")
- Queen of Night
- Rowland (Lord Willowbye's Welcome Home)
- Saddles and Saloons
- Satyr's Dance
- Silent Night
- Six Carols A-Singing
- Sousa Collection
- Spinning Song
- St. David's Day
- Stephen Foster Treasury, A
- The Challenge
- Twelve Days of Christmas
- Two Little Bullfinches
- War Between the States
- Wm Boyce Suite

=== Brass Ensemble ===
- Atlantic Medley
- Canzon in echo duodecimi toni
- Canzon No. 28
- Canzon per sonar septimi et octavi toni a 12
- Credo
- Domine labia mea aperies
- E questra vita
- Gloria: Et in terra pax
- Hodie completi sunt
- Jubilate Deo
- Kyrie eleison
- Un Canadien Errant
- Olympic Fanfare
- Peter Amberly
- Sanctus
- Sanctus VI: Hosanna in excelsis
- Sonata octavi toni

=== Brass & Choir ===
- Ding Dong Merrily On High
- O Christmas Tree
- Six Carols A-Singing
- Twelve Days of Christmas
- Up on a Rooftop

=== Choir ===
- Anne of Green Gables (SSA)
- Up on a Rooftop (SATB)

=== Wind Ensemble/Concert Band ===
- Newfoundland Rhapsody (1956)
- Quebec Folk Fantasy (1953)
- Snake Fence Country (1954)
- Ontario Pictures (1986)
- McIntyre Ranch Country (2002)
- Good Medicine (2005)
- Saskatchewan Overture (2007)
- Canadian Musical Heroes (2015)
- A Musical Tribute to a Legendary Music Man (2016)
- Concertino for Bass Trombone (2016)

=== Marching Band ===
- 10 Provinces March (an arrangement of folk tunes)
