= Lionel Duval =

Canadian sportscaster

- Born: February 11, 1933; Bromptonville, Québec
- Died: September 30, 2016 (aged 83); Boucherville, Québec
- Occupations: television and radio journalist, sports news presenter
- Known for: host of La Soirée du hockey

Lionel Duval (February 11, 1933 – September 30, 2016) was a Canadian sports journalist and long time presenter at La Soirée du hockey.

== Biography ==
Born in the Estrie region of Québec, Lionel Duval graduated from École supérieure de Hull in the Outaouais region. He began his career as a radio broadcaster in the 1950s at CKCH.

In the late 1950s, he was the play-by-play announcer for the Hull-Ottawa Canadiens hockey games.

Duval was hired by Radio-Canada in 1961 in the Outaouais and Ottawa region. One of his first gigs was as the host of Hebdo Sports, a local sports television programme.

In 1964, he was transferred to the Montréal Radio-Canada television station. For close to 30 years he was presenter and interviewer of La Soirée du hockey, the weekly broadcast of the Montreal Canadiens games. He was a sports news presenter for Radio-Canada television as well.

For many of those years at La Soirée du hockey, he was a member of a broadcasting team with René Lecavalier, Richard Garneau and Gilles Tremblay.

During his years at La Soirée du hockey, the Canadiens won the Stanley Cup 11 times, which, according to Radio-Canada, is a record among ice hockey broadcasters.

For Radio-Canada, Lionel Duval covered several Olympic Games, from Munich 1972 to Albertville '92. At the 1976 Summer Olympics in Montréal, he described cycling, rowing and canoeing.

In the 1980s in Québec, he appeared as himself in a Pepsi commercial alongside comedian Claude Meunier.

In 1990, the Québec's voting public award him a MetroStar as their favorite host of a sports programme.

Lionel Duval, aged 60, retired in 1993, after more than 40 years in sports journalism, including 32 years at Radio-Canada. He died of complications from Parkinson's disease in 2016.
