= Ettore Mazzoleni =

Canadian conductor and arts administrator

Ettore Mazzoleni (18 June 1905 – 1 June 1968) was a Canadian conductor, music educator, writer, and arts administrator of Swiss birth. He was one of the Canadian Opera Company's principal conductors during its early years, working there from 1958 to 1968. For many years he was the program annotator of the Toronto Symphony Orchestra (TSO) and also served as the orchestra's associate conductor from 1942 to 1948. He became a naturalized Canadian citizen in 1949.

Born to Swiss-Italian parents in Brusio, Ticino, Switzerland, Mazzoleni earned a Bachelor of Music and a Bachelor of Arts in mathematics from the University of Oxford in 1927. He went on to study piano at the Royal College of Music while simultaneously working on the school's opera staff from 1927 to 1929. While there he had the opportunity to work closely with Sir Adrian Boult and Ralph Vaughan Williams.

In 1929 Mazzoleni immigrated to Canada to join the music and English faculties of the Upper Canada College, where he remained until 1945. He also frequently worked as a consultant for the opera program at the Toronto Conservatory of Music (TCM), beginning with the school's 1929 production of Vaughan Williams's Hugh the Drover. In 1932 he joined the TCM's music faculty where he taught music history and conducting. He later succeeded Donald Heins as the director of the TCM's symphony orchestra in 1934.

While still teaching at the TCM, Mazzoleni was appointed the director of the Opera Division at the University of Toronto (UTOD) in 1952, a post he held until 1966. During his tenure he also worked with the Opera Festival of Toronto (OFT) which had been founded by the UTOD in 1950; serving variously as the festival's artistic director (1953), managing director (1954), and general director (1955–56). In 1958 the OFT became a full-time professional opera company, the Canadian Opera Company, and Mazzoleoni was highly active conducting operas with the company until his sudden death in a car accident in 1968. Among his notable pupils were musicians Howard Cable, Robert Fleming, James Gayfer, Godfrey Ridout, and Rudy Toth.
