= Dusk and Desire =

Studio album by Moev
- Released: 1986
- Recorded: 1984–1985
- Genre: Synth-pop; industrial; dance-pop
- Label: Nettwerk; Profile
- Producer: Moev; Greg Reely; John Forbes; Rob Porter

Moev chronology
Zimmerkampf (1982)	Dusk and Desire (1986)	Yeah, Whatever (1988)

Singles from Dusk and Desire
- 1. "Alibis" Released: 1984; 2. "Took Out the Lace" Released: 1986

Dusk and Desire is the second studio album by electronic band Moev, released in 1986 by Nettwerk and Profile Records. It was Moev's first album to feature Kelly Cook on bass, and the last to feature both Mark Jowett on electric guitar and the band's co-founder Cal Stephenson on synthesizers.

== Critical reception ==
Professional ratings
Review scores
Source	Rating
AllMusic	3/5 stars

In a retrospective review for AllMusic, critic Michael Sutton wrote of the album, "although the album moves at a quick pace, it's still a chore to listen to." Adding that "there's no personality in these tracks; they're faceless. Book of Love springs to mind whenever Michella Arrichiello sings, and that's about as memorable as Dusk and Desire gets."

== Track listing ==
All tracks are written by Michella Arrichiello and Cal Stephenson, except where noted

Side one
No.	Title	Writer(s)	Length
1.	"Sea-Missile Hotel"	Robert Harvey	6:22
2.	"Took Out the Lace"		3:40
3.	"Photos"		4:49
4.	"Kim Says"		3:39
5.	"Czar"		4:18

Side two
No.	Title	Length
6.	"Alibis"	4:35
7.	"Ophelia"	3:57
8.	"Circles and Squares"	3:27
9.	"Beautiful Beast"	3:53
10.	"Sweet Nothings"	4:34

== Personnel ==
Credits are adapted from the Dusk and Desire liner notes.

Moev

- Michela Arrichiello – vocals
- Cal Stephenson – keyboards; programming; vocals
- Mark Jowett – acoustic guitar; electric guitar; EBow
- Tom Ferris – keyboards; programming

Additional musicians

- Lucky Aruliah – synthesizer bass
- Kelly Cook – bass
- Greg Reely – bass
- Christine Jones – backing vocals

Artwork

- Steven Wasney – photography
- Steven R. Gilmore – design
- Greg Sykes – design assistant

Technical

- Moev – producer; engineer
- Greg Reely – producer; engineer
- John Forbes – producer
- Rob Porter – producer
- Terry McBride – executive producer; editing
- Tom Ferris – editing
- Dave Ogilvie – engineer
- George Semkiw – engineer
- Chris Sheppard – editing
