= Jean Pagé =

Canadian sports journalist (1946–2019)

- Born: 8 March 1946; Chicoutimi, Quebec, Canada
- Died: 10 December 2019 (aged 73); Morin-Heights, Quebec, Canada
- Occupation: Sports journalist

Jean Pagé (8 March 1946 – 10 December 2019) was a Canadian sports journalist. Most notably, he was a host for the TV shows La Soirée du hockey and 110%.

== Biography ==
Jean Pagé was born in Chicoutimi, the fourth child of Roméo Pagé and Aline Fortin. He attended secondary school at Séminaire de Chicoutimi, then completed his bachelor's degree at Université Laval.

Pagé was hired by CJMT-DT at age 18 to be a news reader. After leaving the TV station, he met Jacques-Henri Gagnon, then one of the bosses at Radio-Canada in Quebec, who invited him to audition for a news sports broadcasting role. He was hired in 1973.

Pagé covered the volleyball tournament at the 1976 Summer Olympics with Radio-Canada. He was stationed in Quebec City and hosted the shows L'Univers des sports and Les Héros du dimanche. Outside of sports, he co-hosted the cultural news program Québec Magazine in 1980. In 1982, he left Quebec City for Montreal to work full time for Radio-Canada. He participated in several sports broadcasts, and hosted the Formula 1 Grand Prix, tennis tournaments, figure skating, the 1986 FIFA World Cup, as well as several Olympic Games.

Pagé was best known for his appearances on La Soirée du hockey. He hosted the nightly show from 1987 to 2002, when Radio-Canada and the Canadian Broadcasting Corporation stopped airing hockey altogether. After this, he started working for Télévision Quatre-Saisons (TQS), where he became host of 110%. In this program, Pagé discussed sports with coaches, players, and journalists. He left TQS when Remstar acquired the network and renamed it V. Pagé then covered IndyCar and figure skating at TVA Sports. He also ran the program Québec matin week-end on Le Canal Nouvelles.

In 1995, Pagé was diagnosed with prostate cancer, and he was in remission for 22 years. He became spokesperson for Procure, an organization dedicated to fighting prostate cancer. He co-founded the Marche du Courage in 2007 and Randonnée du Courage Pat Burns in 2008 with Procure.

Pagé died on 10 December 2019 in his home in Morin-Heights. He is survived by his wife, Brigitte Bélanger and four children.
