= A Place to Stand (film) =

- Directed by: Christopher Chapman
- Produced by: Christopher Chapman; David Mackay
- Cinematography: Christopher Chapman; Laszlo George; Josef Seckeresh; Peter Turner
- Edited by: Christopher Chapman
- Distributed by: Ontario Department of Economics and Development
- Release date: 1967
- Running time: 17 minutes
- Country: Canada
- Language: English

A Place to Stand is a 1967 film produced and edited by the Canadian artist and filmmaker Christopher Chapman for the Ontario pavilion at Expo 67 in Montréal, Québec, Canada. For the film, he pioneered the concept of moving panes, of moving images, within the single context of the screen. At times there are 15 separate images moving at once. This technique, which he dubbed "multi-dynamic image technique" has since been employed in many films, notably Norman Jewison's 1968 film The Thomas Crown Affair. Jewison has credited Chapman as the creator of the edit style. The technique can also be seen more recently on television in the series 24.

It is said that most of the editing decisions were worked out in an accountant's spreadsheet book and the pencil edit plan resembled flow charts. Chapman has remarked that at one point in the editing process he stood there in the room, bits of footage hanging from clips all around him. He felt crushed by the force of his vision and was a breath away from quitting. Even at the first screening, Chapman was exhausted and unsure but as he left the room, Steve McQueen watching at the back, grabbed Chapman and told him that he was blown away by the film.

The 18-minute film used 70mm stock and was projected onto a 66 by 30 foot screen. It contains no dialogue, but only music by a 45-member orchestra and a 15-member choir. Its theme song, "A Place to Stand, a Place to Grow", written by Dolores Claman and Richard Morris, and orchestrated by Jerry Toth, enjoyed great popularity on its own. Commissioned by the Ontario Department of Economics and Development from the Toronto commercial design studio TDF and premiered at the Expo 67 Ontario Pavilion on April 28, 1967, it was seen by some two million at Expo 67 itself and later by a further estimated 100 million in North America and Europe in cinema release. It was nominated for an Academy Award in two categories: Best Documentary Short Subject and Best Live Action Short Subject. It won the latter prize, which Chapman accepted on April 10, 1968.

The film won the Canadian Film Award for Film of the Year at the 20th Canadian Film Awards in 1968. In the same year it was screened at the 18th Berlin Film Festival as part of Young Canadian Film, a lineup of films by emerging Canadian filmmakers.
