= Elliotte Friedman =

Canadian sports journalist

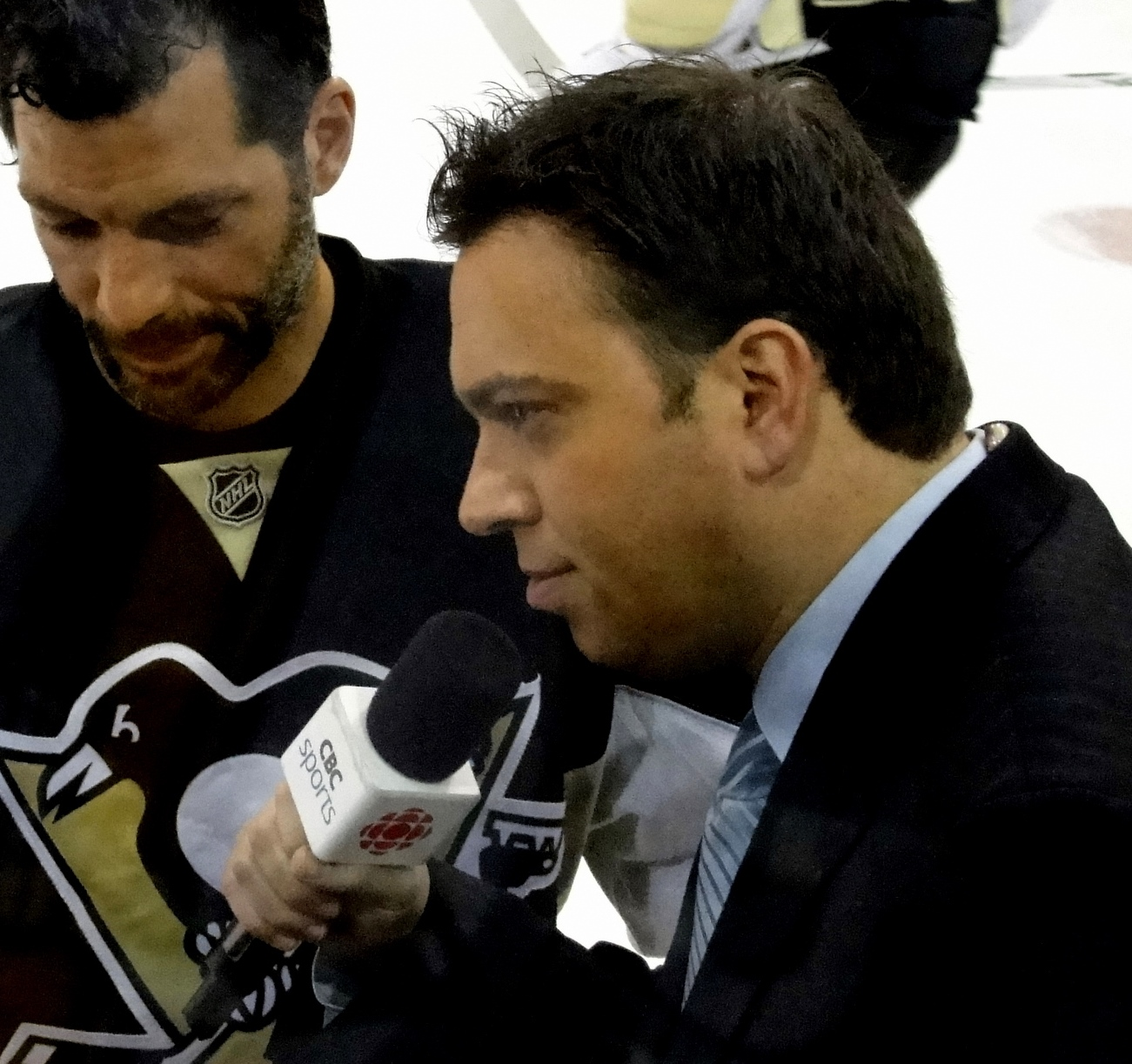
- Friedman interviewing Bill Guerin in May 2010
- Born: September 27, 1970 (age 56); Toronto, Ontario, Canada
- Occupations: Sportscaster, Sports Journalist
- Employer: Rogers Media
- Known for: Hockey Night in Canada

Elliotte Friedman (born September 27, 1970) is a Canadian sports journalist. Since 2014, he has been an ice hockey reporter for Sportsnet and an insider for the NHL Network. He is a regular panelist on Sportsnet’s Saturday Night Hockey.

== Early life and education ==
Friedman was born and raised in a middle-class Jewish home in Toronto. He played hockey when young, but quit by age thirteen, partly for financial reasons. His grandparents were Polish Holocaust survivors who met at Bergen-Belsen, married, and immigrated to Canada after the war.

Friedman attended the University of Western Ontario and worked at the student newspaper The Gazette as a sports editor and eventually as editor-in-chief in 1992–93.

== Career ==
Friedman began his broadcast career for the Toronto sports radio station The Fan 590 in 1994. He did play-by-play for Toronto Raptors games on both radio and television and reported on Toronto Blue Jays games in 1998. He also did freelance work for the London Free Press and the Toronto Star.

Friedman was awarded the Telemedia Reporter of the Year award in 1996. He then worked for The Score network before joining CBC Sports in 2003. At CBC, Friedman was a reporter for Hockey Night in Canada, the studio host for the final two seasons of the CFL on CBC and for some Toronto Raptors games and participated in the CBC's Olympic Games coverage. He began reporting on the CFL in 2006, after Brian Williams moved to CTV/TSN. In 2011, he received the Best Sports Reporting Gemini Award for his work on Hockey Night in Canada's Heritage Classic. He also continued to appear regularly on The Fan 590 (now Sportsnet 590). After Rogers Media acquired exclusive national media rights to the NHL and began producing Hockey Night for CBC, Friedman was hired by Sportsnet to continue his role.

In 2016, Friedman was a commentator during CBC's coverage of diving and swimming events at the 2016 Summer Olympics to replace Steve Armitage (who was unable to attend the Games due to his diagnosis with chronic heart failure).

On August 11, 2016, Friedman received international attention after making a mistake in his commentary of the men's 200 metre individual medley final. He said that the U.S. swimmer Ryan Lochte was leading and had won the race, when it was actually won by his rival, Michael Phelps.

== Personal life ==
Friedman is married to the former television producer Steph Friedman. They have two children, one of them a son who is on the autism spectrum, which has led Friedman to often wear a blue-and-white autism awareness lapel pin during Hockey Night in Canada telecasts.
