= Dolores Claman =

Canadian composer and pianist (1927–2021)

- Claman in 1974.
- Born: Dolores Olga Claman; 6 July 1927; Vancouver, British Columbia, Canada
- Died: 17 July 2021 (aged 94); Spain
- Occupations: Composer, pianist

Dolores Olga Claman (6 July 1927 – 17 July 2021) was a Canadian composer and pianist. She is best known for having composed the 1968 theme song for Canadian Broadcasting Corporation's (CBC) Hockey Night In Canada show, known simply as "The Hockey Theme", which many consider Canada's unofficial second national anthem. She is also known for "A Place to Stand", the tune that accompanied the film of the same name at Montreal's Expo 67 Ontario pavilion. This is regarded as Ontario's de facto provincial anthem.

== Early life ==
Claman was born in Vancouver on 6 July 1927. Her mother worked as an opera singer and Claman first learned the piano in her hometown. After graduating from high school by the age of 16, she studied music and drama at the University of Southern California. Intending to become a concert pianist, she then studied at the Juilliard School on a fellowship. There, she was under the tutelage of Rosina Lhévinne and Eduard Steuermann for piano, as well as Vittorio Giannini and Bernard Wagenaar for composition. Claman's interest in jazz music was piqued and she opted to go into composition instead. After graduating, she moved to London, England in 1953.

== Career ==
In the 1950s while living in Britain, Claman composed music for ITV and wrote songs for West End musical revues. She later moved to Toronto with her writing partner and husband, lyricist Richard Morris. Together they composed over 3,000 commercial jingles in a 30-year period and won more than 40 awards internationally for their work. Claman's two best-known compositions, "A Place to Stand" and "The Hockey Theme", were also orchestrated by Jerry Toth. He, his brother Rudy Toth, and Richard Morris all worked together at Quartet Productions from 1965 until 1970.

Claman commenced legal action against the CBC in 2004, alleging that the network had been making unauthorized use of "The Hockey Theme" in many ways over a long period of time. Among the allegations were the network's long-term non-payment of normal licensing fees; use of the music in many programs not covered by their agreement with her, including NHL Centre Ice; renaming her composition to make it look as if the network owned it; selling it as a cellular phone ringtone; and using it outside of Canada after agreeing not to. On 9 June 2008, it was announced that Claman had sold the rights to the music to private broadcaster CTV. The majority owner of The Sports Network, which also broadcasts hockey games, acquired those rights in perpetuity after an announcement by the CBC that a deal between the public broadcaster and Claman could not be reached.

The popularity of "The Hockey Theme" resulted in many children sending letters and pictures to Claman over the years. On 20 June 2016, Claman was awarded the Cultural Impact Award for "The Hockey Theme" at the SOCAN Awards in Toronto.

== Personal life ==
Claman met Richard Morris while she was living in London, England, and they married in 1957. Together, they had a daughter Madeleine and a son Michael. They remained legally married until her death, though they had separated; he resided in Spain, and she continued to reside in London. Claman died on 17 July 2021, in Spain. She was 94 and had suffered from dementia in the two years prior to her death.

== See also ==
- Music of Canada
- List of Canadian composers
