= Jerry Toth =

Canadian musician

- Born: Jaroslav Toth; November 15, 1928; Windsor, Ontario, Canada
- Died: March 31, 1999 (aged 70); Toronto, Ontario, Canada
- Citizenship: Canadian
- Education: The Royal Conservatory of Music
- Occupations: Musician, woodwind player, Audio consultant
- Years active: 1954-1990
- Known for: The Hockey Theme; A Place to Stand
- Works: The Boss Brass, Timex All Star Swing Festival
- Children: Caroline Toth, Gary Toth

Jaroslav "Jerry" Toth (15 November 1928 – 31 March 1999) was a Canadian jazz saxophonist, clarinetist, flutist, arranger, composer, and record producer.

== Life and career ==
Born in Windsor, Ontario, Toth was the son of Slovak violinist and cimbalom maker Carl Toth, the brother of musicians Rudy Toth and Tony Toth, and the brother-in-law of violinist and lyricist Josephine Toth. He studied at The Royal Conservatory of Music in Toronto with Frank Hiron and Herbert Pye. In 1953, he pursued further woodwind studies with Dale Eisenhuth in Los Angeles.

From 1945–1953 Toth played alto saxophone in numerous dance bands in Toronto, including those led by Stan Patton, Bobby Gimby, and Trump Davidson. From 1952–1957 he co-led a seventeen-piece jazz band with trombonist Ross Culley and saxophonist Roy Smith. From 1956–1974 he studied orchestration with Phil Nimmons and was a member of Nimmons' jazz bands. From 1970–1990 he was a member of Rob McConnell and the Boss Brass, a big band which often featured him on alto saxophone. He also performed with his own jazz quartet. In the latter part of his career, he was active as a studio musician and record producer.

Toth worked for the Canadian Broadcasting Corporation in a variety of roles. In 1954 he began playing in several CBC orchestras conducted by Jack Kane. From 1957–1960 he served as chief arranger and music director for the CBC program Parade. In the mid-1960s he began writing jingles for CBC Radio and Television with his brother, Rudy. He orchestrated the theme music for Hockey Night in Canada and "A Place to Stand, A Place to Grow", the unofficial anthem of Ontario. He served as audio consultant for many TV productions and contributed music to Rich Little's Emmy Award-winning television production of A Christmas Carol.
