= The Hockey Theme =

Instrumental composition by Dolores Claman

Song
- Language: English
- Published: 1968
- Composer: Dolores Claman

"The Hockey Theme" is a Canadian piece of instrumental theme music composed in 1968 by Dolores Claman and orchestrated by Jerry Toth. It was widely recognized as Canada's unofficial second national anthem.

The theme was associated with CBC Television's Hockey Night in Canada, and Télévision de Radio-Canada's La Soirée du hockey beginning in 1968. In 2008, the CBC announced that the negotiations to renew their licence or purchase the theme had been unsuccessful and that they would run a national contest to find a new theme. The rights were then purchased by rival broadcaster CTVglobemedia (now known as Bell Media) in perpetuity. Since 2008, the theme can be heard on hockey broadcasts on the Bell Media-owned TSN and RDS sports networks.

== History ==
=== Origins ===
In 1968, the CBC commissioned McLaren Advertising to create a new promotional tune for Hockey Night in Canada. McLaren contracted Dolores Claman, a classically trained composer who had produced a number of successful jingles, promotional songs and television theme music, to write the tune. Claman had never seen a hockey game in person and wrote the tune imagining Roman gladiators wearing skates. "It just arrived in my head", she recalled several decades later. Claman said she wrote it to reflect the narrative arc of a hockey game from the arrival on the rink, to the battle of the game, to the trip home, "plus a cold beer." Since the song was originally classified as an advertising jingle Claman did not originally get residuals but only a one-time creative fee of $800. The piece was originally performed by a 20-member orchestra.

Claman would later explain how the success of the song would help put Toronto on the international radar of the advertising industry. "Obviously we pleased people and we got a lot of work (out of it at the agency). I think we really did start the big centre that Toronto has turned out to be in the way of music, jingles and advertising." But she says it took nearly a decade, when her son's friends from school came to her door to meet her, for the tune's popularity to fully sink in.

In the 1970s, CBC began using the tune as the standard introduction for the show and Claman was entitled to music-use licence payments of between $2,000 and $10,000 each year. After she was advised by her agent in 1993 to license the tune, she earned approximately $500 per broadcast.

=== Arrangements ===
The theme has been updated several times:

- Mid-1980s—A big-band version of the theme was used.
- 1988—An updated "rock" version of the theme, the version most closely associated with the era when the program was titled Molson Hockey Night in Canada on CBC and La Soirée du hockey Molson à Radio-Canada.
  - This version was edited in the early 1990s to remove the big-band interlude from the main-title theme. This version was used by the CBC for a few seasons, and by Radio-Canada until La Soirée du hockey was discontinued in 2004.
  - In the mid-1990s, another edited version of the main theme was introduced, which replaced the sponsor beds with other music previously played over introductory highlights. This version, along with other musical cues introduced in 1988, were used by the CBC until the end of the Molson era in 1998. This cut of the main theme (but not the other cues) was reintroduced at the start of the 2004 playoffs and used until 2008.
- 1998—After Labatt's took over as title sponsor, a new, mostly synthesized version of the theme was introduced. This was used for two seasons.
- 2000—Another "big-band"-style version, with a significantly different sound compared to previous versions, was introduced. It is believed that this version was dropped quickly due to complaints by Claman.
- 2001—A new synthesized version was introduced. This version was used in the opening until spring 2004 (when the 1988 version was reintroduced), and used in most HNIC advertising until 2008.
- 2009— Neil Peart arranged and recorded a rendition that is used during NHL broadcasts on both TSN and RDS.

In the spring of 2007, CBC introduced a new set of musical cues for commercial-break stings and other transitions based on the Claman theme.

It is believed that CBC continues to own most or all of the above-noted recordings even though it no longer has rights to use the theme itself. CTV's Rick Brace said that a new arrangement will be prepared for TSN/RDS broadcasts. According to Brace the network, "will have to re-orchestrate it... It will still be the same music but it will be a different arrangement. It will be exactly the same tune."

=== Legal action ===
In November 2004, Dolores Claman and her publisher initiated legal action against CBC for breach of copyright, alleging, among other things, that theme was used on other CBC programs, and on HNIC rebroadcasts outside Canada, without consent.

=== 2008 licence renewal negotiations with CBC ===
CBC's most recent licence to use "The Hockey Theme" expired at the conclusion of the 2008 Stanley Cup Playoffs. Claman's publisher issued a statement on June 4, 2008, claiming that the CBC had informed them it would not be renewing its rights to the composition. CBC Sports head Scott Moore denied the reports, saying that CBC wanted to keep the tune and that negotiations on a new licence deal were still ongoing. However, Moore also suggested that the window to reach an agreement was closing, as the broadcaster would need time to find a replacement if negotiations fell through. Under CBC's backup plan, a nationwide contest for Canadian composers would be held to submit a new theme.

Published reports indicate that the impasse was caused by CBC's offer to buy the theme outright for significantly less than Claman's representatives believe it to be worth, as well as the complications relating to the ongoing lawsuit.

The publisher presented CBC with a number of solutions including a licence virtually identical to the one in place for the better part of the previous ten years. This calculated to between $400 and $500 per three-hour game. One exception was that "as a gesture of goodwill" the publisher and Claman were offering that there be no increase in fee for the first two years. The CBC had until the end of June 6, 2008, to accept this offer but, instead, announced their contest to find a new theme.

While negotiations resumed late on June 5 and continued the following day, in the early evening of June 6, CBC announced it could not reach an acceptable agreement, and would proceed with a contest for a new theme in collaboration with music label Nettwerk, with the winner receiving $100,000 and half of all lifetime royalties (CBC would presumably have full ownership of the theme thereafter).

We share with all Canadians the disappointment of this news, as we feel as strongly about the theme as they do. We are proud of the association with the former theme song and are saddened that we were unable to reach a deal, especially when we presented an offer which we believe was not substantively different from what the rights holders had proposed to us. We love the song and know this is a huge disappointment for us and for millions of Canadians. As of today, CBC Sports is moving forward with our plan to have the Canadian public compose the new Hockey Night in Canada theme song.

— Scott Moore, executive director of CBC Sports

This afternoon John Ciccone communicated with Scott Moore of CBC and requested a meeting on Monday to further discuss the issues surrounding "The Hockey Theme". At 4:59 PM (one minute before CBC's deadline) Mr. Moore advised that CBC intended to proceed with an announcement of a National contest unless he had the basis for an agreement. Ms. Claman is saddened and disappointed that CBC is not prepared to negotiate further.

— Statement from Copyright Music & Visuals, Dolores Claman's publisher

The CBC said it had offered nearly $1 million for perpetual rights to the piece, but that Copyright Music was asking for $2.5 to $3 million for those rights. According to Claman, the CBC had offered her $850,000. The proposal to CBC, suggesting it purchase the theme outright, was based on industry standard formulae to derive a purchase price. This is based on earnings and at the same time demonstrated to the CBC how they could make money and save money towards recovering their costs. One of the contest's submissions, "Hockey Scores", had the most views and comments, and was the top rated entry, but didn't make it to the semifinals. The new theme was revealed at 7:00 EDT, on Hockey Night in Canada, on October 11, 2008. The winner was Alberta music teacher Colin Oberst with his song, "Canadian Gold".

==== Acquisition by CTV ====
On June 9, 2008, CBC offered to resume negotiations under mediator Gord Kirke. "We feel this song is worth one last attempt to save. Canadians are passionate about its association with Hockey Night in Canada," said Moore. However, by mid-afternoon, Claman's representatives announced they had sold the broadcast rights in perpetuity to CTV, to be used on TSN, RDS hockey broadcasts and possibly on CTV's coverage of Olympic hockey at the 2010 Winter Olympics. Shortly after the announcement, the CBC filed applications to protect what appear to be three versions of "The Hockey Theme" as sound trademarks. These applications were abandoned on December 30, 2009.

CTV opted not to use the theme during the Olympics and instead used "I Believe", the theme song of the network's coverage. "The Hockey Theme" was played as part of the 2010 Winter Olympics closing ceremony; as the ceremonies were aired internationally, the composition received rare worldwide exposure.

The song has a long and storied history in Canadian sports and has become ingrained in the hearts and minds of hockey fans across the country. It is an iconic tune, embraced by Canadians everywhere, and we felt it was imperative to save it. We know we will be in hockey forever, so there's no doubt this acquisition will create value for us. It's an honour and a privilege to own such a cherished piece of Canadiana.

— Rick Brace, president (revenue, business planning and sports), CTV Inc.

A new arrangement was used by CTVglobemedia at the 2008 MuchMusic Video Awards, with a rock arrangement which was played as Jason Spezza of the Ottawa Senators appeared on stage to help present the award for MuchVibe Best Rap Video Award.

The new version of "The Hockey Theme" was recorded by members of the Toronto Symphony Orchestra and leaked by Canadian Press in a video first posted September 24, 2008.

TSN and RDS lost the rights to the NHL's national broadcast package to Rogers Media after the 2013–14 season. TSN said that the network "will continue to use 'The Hockey Theme' in our hockey broadcasts moving forward." TSN's regional broadcasts of the Ottawa Senators, Toronto Maple Leafs, Winnipeg Jets, Montreal Canadiens and RDS's French-language telecasts of the Montreal Canadiens still use "The Hockey Theme". After TSN assumed the rights for the English-language telecast of the Canadiens for the 2017–18 season, TSN also used "The Hockey Theme" for these broadcasts as well.

== See also ==
- Canadian patriotic music
- "The Hockey Song"
- Hockey Night in Canada
- NHL on TSN
