= Don Cherry's Rock'em Sock'em Hockey =

- Produced by: Tim Cherry (Quality Video/TPC Productions)
- Starring: Don Cherry
- Edited by: Blomeley Communications Inc.
- Distributed by: Molstar/Molson Sports & Entertainment (1989-2005); Kaboom! Entertainment (2006-2007); Warner Home Video (2008-2011); VSC/Unobstructed View (2012-2018)
- Running time: 30-90 minutes
- Country: Canada
- Language: English

Don Cherry's Rock'em Sock'em Hockey (also simplified as Don Cherry's Rock'em Sock'em from 1992 to 1997 and Don Cherry from 1998 to 2007) are a series of hockey highlight videos starring noted Canadian hockey commentator Don Cherry. The series was created by Cherry and his son Tim, via the latter's company Tim Cherry Enterprises created and produce the series.

Each video features a compilation of NHL plays, goals, saves, bloopers, and hits, typically focusing on the preceding NHL season, and generally set to backing rock and techno music. Highlights from Cherry's Coach's Corner segment of Hockey Night in Canada are also regularly featured, while many also include a recap of the year's Stanley Cup Playoffs. Some installments (including five from 2010 to 2017) feature Cherry hosting on location from a hockey arena or hall of fame.

Despite the series name's allusion to the Rock'Em Sock'Em Robots toy, hockey fights are not a primary source of content, with only one or two examples typically featured at the end of most videos, with Don commonly referring to the segment as "tea time" for viewers who don't like "the odd tussle." The title instead alludes to the physical style of hockey that Cherry prefers. The Rock'em Sock'em title was dropped from the series for the 10 installments from 1998 to 2007 due to a naming rights dispute.

The first Rock'em Sock'em Hockey video was released on VHS in December 1989, and quickly became a huge success in the marketplace, subsequently becoming the best selling sports video franchise in Canadian history. The franchise has sold over two million units to date, and continues to be one of the highest selling sports videos, with installments traditionally being released in December for the holiday season. Don Cherry's Rock 'Em Sock 'Em 30 was expected to be the series' final installment upon its release on December 11, 2018. “I will miss doing it. I loved working with Tim on it for all these years. The only time I was happier was when I used to go see him play hockey,” said Don. “I want to thank all of the fans supporting it and the players who are in the videos too. A lot of them are grandfathers now in their 50s themselves.”

Since 2007, some videos in the series have been sold in the United States under the altered title Don Cherry's Hard Hitting Hockey, though sometimes using the chronology of the original Rock'em Sock'em series to number them despite largely not being released in that market. The 16th-19th releases in the series were re-released with new cover artwork and the Rock'em Sock'em branding as premium giveaways with the cold remedy Cold-fX, as part of their endorsement deal with Cherry. The 10th-14th installments were re-issued in the 2002 box set Don Cherry Penalty Box, while all installments to that point were re-issued in a collector's DVD box set in 2013 for the series' 25th anniversary.

The final edition was released in 2018, with Cherry announcing that the 30th edition would be the last.

Title	Year of release	Length	Notes
Don Cherry's Rock'em Sock'em Hockey	1989	30 minutes	First release in the Rock 'Em Sock 'Em series
Don Cherry's Rock'em Sock'em Hockey Volume 2	1990	35 minutes	First video featuring Coach's Corner highlights. Features the novelty rap song "Grapejam".
Don Cherry's Rock'em Sock'em Hockey 3	1991	45 minutes	Also released with changed box artwork as Don Cherry's All New Rock 'Em Sock 'Em Hockey
Don Cherry's Rock'em Sock'em 4	1992	46 minutes	First video without "Hockey" in the title.
Don Cherry's Rock'em Sock'em 5	1993	60 minutes	Features the music video for "Rock' em Sock' em Techno" by BKS featuring Don Cherry
Don Cherry's Rock'em Sock'em 6	1994	90 minutes	Features bonus segment with Don Cherry's safety tips for young hockey players.
Don Cherry's Rock'em Sock'em 7	1995	60 minutes	Host segments filmed at the Hockey Hall of Fame. Features bonus segment with Don Cherry's tips for buying proper hockey equipment.
Don Cherry's Rock'em Sock'em 8	1996	60 minutes	Features bonus segment with Don Cherry's tips for running hockey practices.
Don Cherry's Rock'em Sock'em 9	1997	60 minutes	Features bonus segment with Don Cherry answering questions from hockey parents.
Don Cherry 10th Anniversary	1998	60 minutes	First video released on DVD. First installment simply called "Don Cherry". Host segments filmed at Maple Leaf Gardens; Features highlights from the past 10 seasons
Don Cherry 11, The New Millennium	1999	60 minutes	Host segments feature Don Cherry running a practice session for the OHL's Mississauga IceDogs, who he co-owned and later coached. Features bonus segment with Don Cherry giving advice to parents to help their children progress in minor hockey.
Don Cherry 12	2000	60 minutes	First video without Coach's Corner highlights since the first installment Features bonus highlights from the talk show Don Cherry's Grapevine.
Don Cherry Lucky 13	2001	60 minutes	Features bonus segment where Don Cherry gives advice for parents & coaches of young hockey players.
Don Cherry 14	2002	60 minutes	First video with multiple licensed songs from outside artists
Don Cherry Penalty Box	2002	240 minutes	4 DVD set of the last 4 releases in the series
Don Cherry 15	2003	70 minutes	First video featuring extensive usage of soundbites from NHL play by play announcers
Don Cherry 16	2004	70 minutes	Host segments filmed at the Hockey Hall of Fame. Features bonus Play it Cool segment where Keith Primeau gives advice on how to give and take hits. Retitled Don Cherry's Rock 'Em Sock 'Em 16 for Cold-fx premium reissue in 2013.
Don Cherry 17	2005	70 minutes	Due to the 2004–05 NHL lockout, this video featured top players, highlights, and moments chosen from the past 50 years of NHL history. Features highlights from the 2004-05 London Knights' Memorial Cup-winning season. Subtitled "The Best of The Best" on the back cover and title screen. Retitled Don Cherry's Rock 'Em Sock 'Em 17 for Cold-fx premium reissue in 2013. Last video released on VHS. Last video released by Molson Sports & Entertainment
Don Cherry 18	2006	90 minutes	First video with Coach's Corner highlights since 1999; Host segments filmed at a Carolina Hurricanes practice at Rexall Place during the 2006 Stanley Cup Final; First video with official Hockey Night in Canada branding Features unadvertised bonus DVD Don Cherry's Grapevine: A Collection of Great Interviews; Retitled Don Cherry's Rock 'Em Sock 'Em 18 for Cold-fx premium reissue in 2013.
Don Cherry 19	2007	70 minutes	Released as Don Cherry's Hard Hitting Hockey 2007 in the United States; Retitled Don Cherry's Rock 'Em Sock 'Em 19 for Cold-fx premium reissue in 2013.
Don Cherry's Rock 'em Sock 'em Hockey 20	2008	70 minutes	First video with the full "Rock'em Sock'em Hockey" title since 1991; Released as Don Cherry's Hard Hitting Hockey 20 in the United States; Special edition includes steelbook packaging and a bonus disc
Don Cherry's Rock' em Sock' em Hockey 21	2009	72 minutes	Released as Don Cherry's Hard Hitting Hockey 3 in the United States
Don Cherry's Rock' em Sock' em Hockey 22	2010	82 minutes	Host segments filmed at The Spectrum in Philadelphia, Pennsylvania; Released as Don Cherry's Hard Hitting Hockey 4 in the United States
Don Cherry's Rock' em Sock' em Hockey 23	2011	78 minutes	
Don Cherry's Rock' em Sock' em Hockey 24	2012		First video released on Blu-ray; Host segments filmed at a Los Angeles Kings practice at the Prudential Center during the 2012 Stanley Cup Final; Features the music video for "Rock' em Sock' em Techno" by BKS featuring Don Cherry. First video released by VSC (now Unobstructed View); Features the Los Angeles Kings' Stanley Cup celebration as a Blu-Ray-exclusive extra.
Don Cherry's Rock' em Sock' em 25	2013		Host segments filmed at Canlan Ice Sports in Toronto, Ontario. Features archival Coach's Corner clips Released as Don Cherry's Hard Hitting Hockey 25 in the United States; Last video with official Hockey Night in Canada branding.
Don Cherry's Rock' em Sock' em Hockey: Silver Anniversary Collection	2013	1,550 minutes	8 DVD set of all 25 videos to that point The only official release of Rock 'Em Sock 'Em 1-9 on DVD
Don Cherry's Rock 'em Sock 'em Hockey 26	2014	65 minutes	
Don Cherry's Rock 'em Sock 'em Hockey 27	2015	75 minutes	Host segments filmed at the Mattamy Athletic Center at Maple Leaf Gardens
Don Cherry's Rock 'em Sock 'em Hockey 28	2016	60 minutes	Last video released on Blu-Ray
Don Cherry's Rock 'em Sock 'em Hockey 29	2017	60 minutes	Host segments filmed at the International Hockey Hall of Fame in Kingston, Ontario; Features a bonus interview with Don Cherry on Tim & Sid from December 20, 2016; Last video featuring licensed songs from outside artists
Don Cherry's Rock 'em Sock 'em Hockey 30	2018	60 minutes	Last release in the Rock 'Em Sock 'Em series Features a collectors card inside each DVD case Features the music video for "Rock' em Sock' em Techno" by BKS featuring Don Cherry as a bonus feature
