= Zeroman =

- DVD cover
- Developed by: J.D. Smith
- Directed by: Chris Roy; Stacey Eberschlag
- Voices of: Leslie Nielsen; Ryan Reynolds
- Country of origin: Canada
- Original language: English
- No. of seasons: 1
- No. of episodes: 13

Production
- Executive producers: Mark Edwards; Sheldon Wiseman
- Running time: 22 minutes
- Production company: Amberwood Entertainment

Original release
- Network: Teletoon
- Release: September 11 – December 5, 2004

Zeroman is a Canadian animated series produced by Amberwood Entertainment that aired on the Canadian cartoon network Teletoon (in English) and on Télétoon (in French). It tells the adventures of incompetent sixty-three-year-old postman Les Mutton (voiced by Leslie Nielsen) who also happens to be the superhero known as Zeroman. As Zeroman, Les fights the crime that plagues Fair City in a similar fashion to Nielsen's Lieutenant Frank Drebin character in The Naked Gun series.

== Premise ==
The Zerosuit grants its wearer invulnerability (although not completely, especially in areas like the solar plexus where the weave is thinner), flight (taking to the air with a cry of "Out, Out and Away!" apparently through a form of super-flatulence), superhuman strength and various other abilities, including shooting sticky glue-like super-mucus out of his nose when his allergies get particularly bad as in the episode "The Humidifier". Even though the suit grants its user incredible power, the suit is susceptible to anti-static sheets. When affected by them, the suit wearer is incapacitated, handicapped and put through immense pain as the suit begins to bulge uncontrollably.

Most of the characters are actually modeled after their voice actors. Les/Zeroman, Ty, Rusty, Don and Ron all share many resemblances to their real-life counterparts (Reynolds, who voiced Ty, used to have a moustache).

== Characters ==
Les Mutton/Zeroman (voiced by Leslie Nielsen): Les comes into the possession of an alien supersuit that grants the wearer superpowers, turning him into Fair City's hero, Zeroman. When not fighting crime, Les Mutton is an absent-minded and mild-mannered postman who still lives with his mother at the age of sixty-three. Zeroman maintains his secret identity similar to Superman but in reverse, whereas Les does not wear glasses and Zeroman does (the Zero-Specs are also a highly advanced communication system that allows him to keep in constant contact with Ty). Even though it is quite obvious that the two are the same person, the people of Fair City (with the exception of Ty and Gary) cannot seem to tell the difference and would even go as far as telling Les otherwise whenever his cover would be blown. Zeroman's secret hideout is located under his mother's shabby suburban house. The main secret entrance is via the toilet in his washroom, and when activated by jiggling the handle and allowing the seat to scan his bum print, it sends Les down the "Poop-Chute" through a network of tunnels to the caverns of his base. While not explained in detail, Les' father was a secret agent (the Zero-Specs were originally one of his spy gadgets). Les has romantic feelings for his co-worker, Sally, but can never really express them to her and seems unaware that she actually reciprocates them. Les is quite neurotic and not very bright with a tendency to misunderstand just about everything that is said to him, and his natural clumsiness, augmented by his cheerful obliviousness, is magnified to incredible proportions by the suit, but he is brave and good-hearted and is dedicated to fighting the forces of evil. He also has a strong love of his mother and goes into fetal position muttering "Mommy, mommy, mommy" when she gets kidnapped (referred as "Mommy go bye-bye syndrome" by Ty).

Jaundice Mutton (voiced by Doris Roberts) simply wants her son to finally move out of the house and get married. She is a cruel and bitter old woman who is constantly annoyed at her inept son. Jaundice is also Zeroman's #1 fan, where the irony comes in as she simply loathes her son but is head over heels for his alter-ego, such as in the episode "Smotherly Love" taking the hero hostage like in the Stephen King novel/film Misery.

Ty Cheese (voiced by Ryan Reynolds) is a former secret agent who aids Zeroman in his fight against the evil-doers of Fair City. Ty provides Zeroman with technological and intelligence support as well as giving the inept hero the constant guidance and advice he so desperately needs because, as he says, "Ty is always right". He is implicitly gay. Ty was briefly the feline superhero Hellcat with Gary as his bovine sidekick Holy Cow when Zeroman was out of town at a hero convention in the episode "Peace Off".

Sally Uberchick is Les' much younger co-worker and love interest. She has strong feelings for Les and is always waiting for him to make a move, but he never does because he is always called to action during their moments together. Sally is also known to be Zeroman's "main squeeze" by the people of Fair City, even though she constantly denies it as there is truly nothing going on between them. This gossip, of course, puts her in danger many times.

Gary Glengarry/O-Boy: Gary as O-Boy is Zeroman's obnoxious but loyal ten-year-old sidekick-in-training, constantly getting into arguments with Ty over their mission and willing to use any means necessary, including sabotage, to get his chance to be an actual full-fledged superhero. An orphan who, despite his ambition, looks upon Zeroman as the father figure he never had, Gary is a boy millionaire who provides the financial backing for the team as well as a host of gadgets and other advanced technology that never seems to work properly.

Rusty Woodenwater (voiced by Kevin McDonald) is a former child star turned criminal mastermind. Rusty was once the most loved television personality of Fair City until he entered puberty. He had his first acne outbreak on-air during his show, which resulted in the eventual cancellation of his show and the decline of his career, ending when he was booed off his show. After falling from grace, Rusty went from being famous to becoming Fair City's most dangerous supervillain. The Zerosuit was also originally made for Rusty, which resulted in many failed attempts at trying to retrieve it from Zeroman. Even though he is an evil genius and criminal mastermind, Rusty on occasion throws fits and tantrums, and he has his henchmen Don and Ron do his dirty work due to basically being ineffectual as a villain. Like his nemesis Zeroman, he also has a poor relationship with his mother. Rusty's most distinguishing characteristics are his mullet-cut red hair and his annoyingly shrill voice.

Don is Rusty's former manager turned henchman. He is dressed up as a 1940s-style gangster, with a tough, no-nonsense attitude and the catchphrase "Ba-wango!". He is modeled after former NHL coach and hockey personality Don Cherry, who also provides the voice for him.

Ron is Rusty's former publicist turned henchman, often serving as a whipping boy for his ill-tempered companions. Like Don, Ron is modeled after and voiced by hockey personality Ron MacLean.

Mayor Todd MacWadd is a friendly and naïve mayor of Fair City who issues the order to summon Zeroman when needed via a catapult on top of City Hall which launches the "Great Flaming Holes!" (huge truck tires which have been set on fire) off into the sky in random directions, usually causing damage to property throughout the surrounding city when they crash to the ground.

Helga is the corrupt police chief of Fair City who is in love with Rusty, giving him aid and comfort with his criminal schemes. She is a large woman with a Russian accent.

== Cast ==
- Leslie Nielsen as Les Mutton/Zeroman
- Ryan Reynolds as Ty Cheese
- Don Cherry as Don
- Ron MacLean as Ron
- Kevin McDonald as Rusty Woodenwater
- Chantal Quesnel as Sally Uberchick, Ann Droid
- Kate Hurman as Jaundice Mutton (Les Muttons mother), Chief Helga
- Norman Mikeal Berketa as Mayor MacWadd, Bucky Dentyne, Various
- David L. McCallum as Reverend Loveglove, Dirk Dinkle, Various
- James Watts as Gary Glengarry/O Boy
- J.D. Wilson as Various

== Episodes ==
A total of 13 episodes were produced. The complete series was released on DVD in North America on June 2, 2009.

1. Crack of Doom: written by J.D. Smith
2. Smotherly Love: written by David Finley
3. Hamsassin: written by Dale Schott
4. Super Suit and Ty Required: written by J.D. Smith
5. Artificial Intolerance: written by David Finley
6. Mutton In Common: written by Peter Sauder
7. Peace Off: written by Simon Racioppa, Richard Elliott, and J.D. Smith
8. Son of Zeroman: written by J.D. Smith
9. The Hummidifier: written by David Finley
10. Z-Man of Alcatruss: written by David Finley
11. Disorder in the Court: written by Peter Sauder
12. Alpha Beta VH Les: written by Jonathan Wiseman, Chris Roy, and Andrew King
13. Les Than Zero: written by Peter Sauder
