= Ralph Mellanby =

Canadian sportscaster (1934–2022)

- Born: August 22, 1934; Hamilton, Ontario, Canada
- Died: January 29, 2022 (aged 87); St. Catharines, Ontario, Canada
- Education: Wayne State University
- Occupations: Broadcaster, producer
- Years active: 1958 – late 1990s
- Notable work: Hockey Night in Canada (1966–85)
- Spouse: Janet (m. 1963; died 2001)
- Children: 2, including Scott
- Awards: Emmy Award (5)

Ralph Mellanby (August 22, 1934 – January 29, 2022) was a Canadian sportscaster and television producer, who was the executive producer of Hockey Night in Canada broadcasts from 1966 to 1985 and on the production team for various Olympic Games broadcasts.

== Early life and career ==
Mellanby was born on August 22, 1934, in Hamilton, Ontario, but grew up in Essex County, Ontario, where his father, Edgar, worked as a newspaper editor for The Windsor Star. After graduating from high school in Windsor, he attended Wayne State University in nearby Detroit, Michigan, where he earned a Bachelor of Arts degree in communications in 1958. He also played professional baseball during his years at college. He found his first job at CKLW-TV in Windsor, Ontario, first as a prop assistant, and later as a stagehand, cameraman and floor manager.

== Hockey Night in Canada ==
In 1959, Mellanby accepted a job as a cameraman at WXYZ-TV in Detroit, and the following year he moved to Chicago to become a sports producer at WGN-TV in Chicago, before returning to Canada to work at CFCF-TV (CTV) in Montreal in 1961 where he produced sports programming, including NHL game broadcasts beginning in 1963. He joined the Canadian Sports Network (CSN) in 1966 to be the producer for their Hockey Night in Canada in broadcasts; he would remain with them for 19 years as executive producer, hiring sports commentators including Ron MacLean, Dick Irvin Jr., Jim Robson, Bob Cole, Dave Hodge, Dan Kelly, Mickey Redmond, Don Cherry, and Howie Meeker. During his time with Hockey Night in Canada, he oversaw the inclusion of many components of the modern hockey broadcast, including slow motion replay, as well as microphone and camera setups across the rink to enhance the viewer experience.

== Olympic Games ==
Mellanby was involved in the production of Olympic Winter Games hockey broadcasts across Canada, starting with the 1976 Winter Olympics up to the 1994 Winter Olympics, was a member of the productions teams for Summer Olympics in 1992 and 1996.

For the 1988 Winter Olympics held in Calgary, Alberta, Mellanby was the executive producer of the Canadian Television Network Host Broadcaster (CTV HB). He oversaw a production which featured a television lens identified by Maclean's as "the world's longest", for coverage of ski jumping, cameras mounted on rolling tracks and on athletes themselves, as well as four high speed cameras to capture slow motion footage. An extensive setup of microphones throughout outdoor event courses and indoor venues was also used to capture "natural sounds" for the viewing audience and fill breaks in commentary.

== Other work ==
Mellanby was involved in the broadcasts for Canadian Open tournaments in golf and tennis, the Canadian Football League, and Major League Baseball (Montreal Expos and Toronto Blue Jays). He was also the vice president of MacLaren Advertising from 1969 to 1977 and founder of Mellanby Robertson Productions (along with Brian Robertson).

In 2007, he co-authored a book with Mike Brophy regarding his years with Hockey Night in Canada, entitled Walking With Legends. In 2009, he released another book entitled Let the Games Begin: My Life with Olympians, Hockey Heroes and Other Good Sports.

== Awards and honours ==
Mellanby won five Emmy Awards (for his Olympics work, including coverage of the Miracle on Ice telecast in 1980), two Kennedy Awards and a Lifetime Achievement Award from Sports Media Canada. He received an honorary Doctor of Laws degree from the University of Windsor in 1998, and in 2004 was inducted into the Windsor/Essex County Sports Hall of Fame as a builder.

== Personal life ==
Mellanby married Janet, a University of Alberta school nursing graduate, around 1963. She died in 2001. His son, Scott Mellanby, was a professional hockey player who played 1,431 games in the NHL, and his daughter Laura was a sports broadcasting executive with CTV and ESPN. He later resided in Atlanta, Georgia. He died on January 29, 2022, at the age of 87 from heart failure.
