= Scott Mellanby =

Canadian ice hockey player

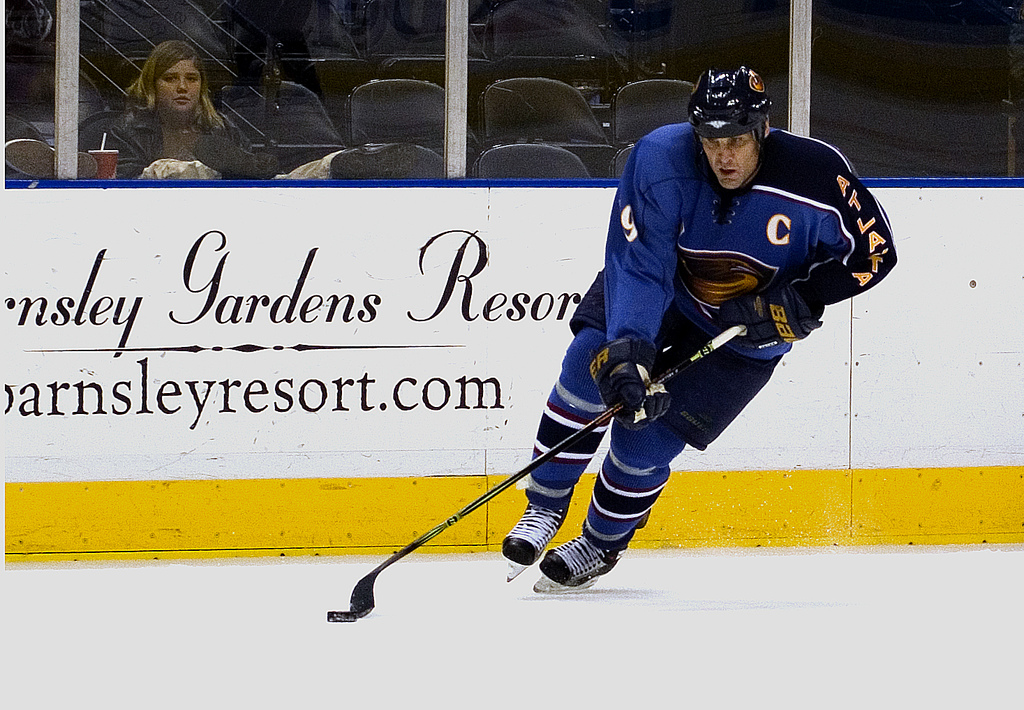
- Mellanby with the Atlanta Thrashers in 2005
- Born: June 11, 1966 (age 60) Montreal, Quebec, Canada
- Height: 6 ft 1 in (185 cm)
- Weight: 210 lb (95 kg; 15 st 0 lb)
- Position: Right Wing
- Shot: Right
- Played for: Philadelphia Flyers; Edmonton Oilers; Florida Panthers; St. Louis Blues; Atlanta Thrashers
- NHL draft: 27th overall, 1984; Philadelphia Flyers
- Playing career: 1986–2007
Medal record
Representing Canada
Ice hockey
World Junior Championships
Silver medal – second place	1986 Hamilton

Scott Edgar Mellanby (born June 11, 1966) is a Canadian former professional ice hockey player, coach, and executive. He primarily played right wing throughout his National Hockey League (NHL) career, on occasion shifting over to the left side. He is the son of former Hockey Night in Canada producer Ralph Mellanby.

== Playing career ==
=== Amateur ===
As a youth, Mellanby played in the 1979 Quebec International Pee-Wee Hockey Tournament with a minor ice hockey team from Mississauga.

=== Collegiate ===
Mellanby was selected 27th overall by the Philadelphia Flyers in the 1984 NHL entry draft. After being drafted, Mellanby went to the University of Wisconsin–Madison where he played for two seasons. While there, he also competed with Canada's National Hockey Team. He finished his collegiate career with 35 goals and 82 points in 72 games.

=== Professional ===
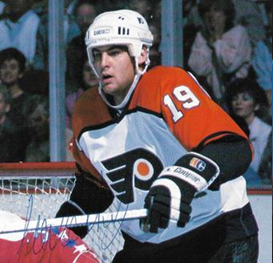
Scott Mellanby in 1987 postcard for Philadelphia Flyers

After his second season in the WCHA was finished, he promptly played his first two NHL games. He made his NHL debut on March 22, 1986, against the New York Rangers. In 1989, Mellanby suffered a serious injury in a barroom brawl when he tried to help a friend and he wound up getting a severe cut from a broken beer bottle on his left arm. The cut sliced four tendons, a nerve and an artery in the arm.

Mellanby would play for Philadelphia until the summer of 1991, when he was traded to the Edmonton Oilers in a 6-player deal that included Jari Kurri going to Philadelphia (though Kurri was traded to the Los Angeles Kings the same day).

Mellanby was left unprotected by the Edmonton Oilers in the 1993 NHL Expansion Draft, allowing him to be claimed by the new Florida Panthers. This was the team where Mellanby would have his best years. In fact he became a fan favorite in Florida when he killed a rat with his hockey stick in the team dressing room, spawning the "rat trick" craze, where fans would litter the ice with thousands of plastic rats after each Panthers goal. He also scored the Panthers' first ever goal in franchise history on October 9, 1993, and played in the 1996 All-Star game.

Mellanby was traded to the St. Louis Blues in February 2001, and the move revitalized his career. He scored 57 points during the 2002–03 season, his highest total since 1996. Mellanby then signed as a free agent with the Atlanta Thrashers in the summer of 2004 and he re-signed with Atlanta for the 2006–07 season. On November 23, 2006, he was suspended one game for a fight between the Thrashers and the Washington Capitals.

== Retirement ==
Mellanby announced his retirement on 24 April 2007, becoming the first player to retire as a Thrashers captain (the four previous Thrashers captains, were either traded or signed elsewhere via free agency). Mellanby left the game having played the 3rd most NHL games (1431) without a Stanley Cup victory, only behind Phil Housley (1495) and Mike Gartner (1432). The closest Mellanby came to the cup was when his Philadelphia Flyers lost to Edmonton in the 1987 Stanley Cup Finals, 4 games to 3.

Following retirement, Mellanby worked for three years in the Vancouver Canucks organization as a special consultant to general manager Mike Gillis and the hockey operations department. Mellanby then spent two years as an assistant coach with the St. Louis Blues before stepping down following the 2011–12 season to pursue other opportunities in hockey.

On May 28, 2012, Mellanby was hired by the Montreal Canadiens as director of player personnel and became an assistant GM on July 30, 2014. He joined the St. Louis Blues as senior advisor to the general manager on July 11, 2022.

== Personal life ==
Mellanby and his wife, Susan, have a daughter, Courtney, and two sons, Carter and Nicholas. Mellanby is also involved in many autism-related causes as his son Carter is autistic. Along with fellow NHLers Olaf Kolzig and Byron Dafoe, Mellanby is a founder of Athletes Against Autism.

== Records ==
- Most power play goals in a game: 4 (03/06/2003 vs Phoenix; shared with seven players)

== Career statistics ==
=== Regular season and playoffs ===
			Regular season					Playoffs
Season	Team	League	GP	G	A	Pts	PIM	GP	G	A	Pts	PIM
1982–83	Don Mills Flyers AAA	MTHL	72	66	52	118	38	—	—	—	—	—
1983–84	Henry Carr Crusaders	MetJHL	39	37	37	74	97	—	—	—	—	—
1984–85	Wisconsin Badgers	WCHA	40	14	24	38	60	—	—	—	—	—
1985–86	Wisconsin Badgers	WCHA	32	21	23	44	89	—	—	—	—	—
1985–86	Philadelphia Flyers	NHL	2	0	0	0	0	—	—	—	—	—
1986–87	Philadelphia Flyers	NHL	71	11	21	32	94	24	5	5	10	46
1987–88	Philadelphia Flyers	NHL	75	25	26	51	185	7	0	1	1	16
1988–89	Philadelphia Flyers	NHL	76	21	29	50	183	19	4	5	9	28
1989–90	Philadelphia Flyers	NHL	57	6	17	23	77	—	—	—	—	—
1990–91	Philadelphia Flyers	NHL	74	20	21	41	155	—	—	—	—	—
1991–92	Edmonton Oilers	NHL	80	23	27	50	197	16	2	1	3	29
1992–93	Edmonton Oilers	NHL	69	15	17	32	147	—	—	—	—	—
1993–94	Florida Panthers	NHL	80	30	30	60	149	—	—	—	—	—
1994–95	Florida Panthers	NHL	48	13	12	25	90	—	—	—	—	—
1995–96	Florida Panthers	NHL	79	32	38	70	160	22	3	6	9	44
1996–97	Florida Panthers	NHL	82	27	29	56	170	5	0	2	2	4
1997–98	Florida Panthers	NHL	79	15	24	39	127	—	—	—	—	—
1998–99	Florida Panthers	NHL	67	18	27	45	85	—	—	—	—	—
1999–00	Florida Panthers	NHL	77	18	28	46	126	4	0	1	1	2
2000–01	Florida Panthers	NHL	40	4	9	13	46	—	—	—	—	—
2000–01	St. Louis Blues	NHL	23	7	1	8	25	15	3	3	6	17
2001–02	St. Louis Blues	NHL	64	15	26	41	93	10	7	3	10	18
2002–03	St. Louis Blues	NHL	80	26	31	57	176	6	0	1	1	10
2003–04	St. Louis Blues	NHL	68	14	17	31	76	4	0	1	1	2
2005–06	Atlanta Thrashers	NHL	71	12	22	34	55	—	—	—	—	—
2006–07	Atlanta Thrashers	NHL	69	12	24	36	63	4	0	0	0	4
NHL totals			1,431	364	476	840	2,479	126	24	29	53	220

=== International ===
Year	Team	Event	Result	GP	G	A	Pts	PIM
1986	Canada	WJC	2nd place, silver medalist(s)	7	5	4	9	6
Junior totals				7	5	4	9	6

== See also ==
- Captain
- List of NHL players with 1,000 games played
- List of NHL players with 2,000 career penalty minutes

Sporting positions
Preceded by Brian Skrudland	Florida Panthers captain 1997–2001	Succeeded by Pavel Bure; Paul Laus
Preceded by Shawn McEachern	Atlanta Thrashers captain 2005–07	Succeeded by Bobby Holik
