= Coach's Corner =

Televised ice hockey commentary segment

- Genre: Sports commentary
- Presented by: Don Cherry (1982–2019); Dave Hodge (1982–1986); Ron MacLean (1986–2019)
- Country of origin: Canada
- No. of seasons: 38

Production
- Producer: Kathy Broderick
- Camera setup: Single-camera
- Running time: 7 min (before Oct 2014); 5 min (Oct 2014–Nov 2019)
- Production companies: CBC (1982–2014); Rogers Media (2014–2019)

Original release
- Network: CBC (1982–2014); Sportsnet via CBC (2014–2019)
- Release: 1982 – 9 November 2019

Coach's Corner is a commentary and analysis segment that aired from 1982 to 2019 during the first intermission of the Hockey Night in Canada (HNIC) television broadcast of National Hockey League (NHL) games. It featured Don Cherry, and was co-hosted by Dave Hodge from 1982 until 1986, and by Ron MacLean from 1986 to 2019.

The popularity of the segment led to Cherry placing seventh in the television show The Greatest Canadian, ahead of John A. Macdonald, the first Prime Minister of Canada, and Wayne Gretzky, considered one of the greatest hockey players.

MacLean has referred to the show as "six minutes of psychotherapy for athletes". The show has also been described as "one of the most watched five minutes on Canadian TV", and Cherry as an "icon of Canadian TV hockey".

The last airing of the segment was on November 9, 2019, two days before the firing of Cherry from Hockey Night in Canada for comments that suggested Canadian immigrants benefit from the sacrifices of veterans but do not wear Remembrance Day poppies.

== Background ==
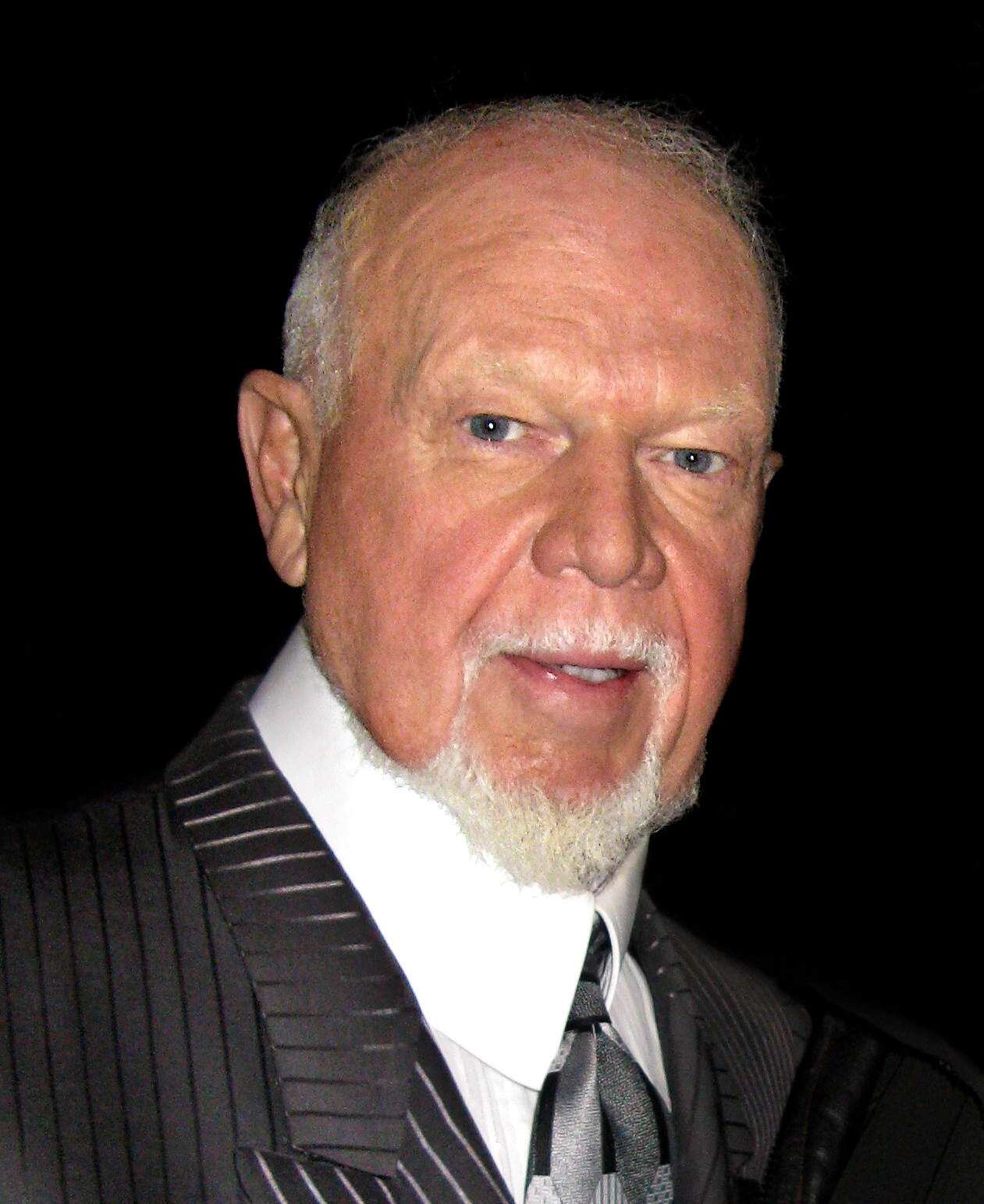
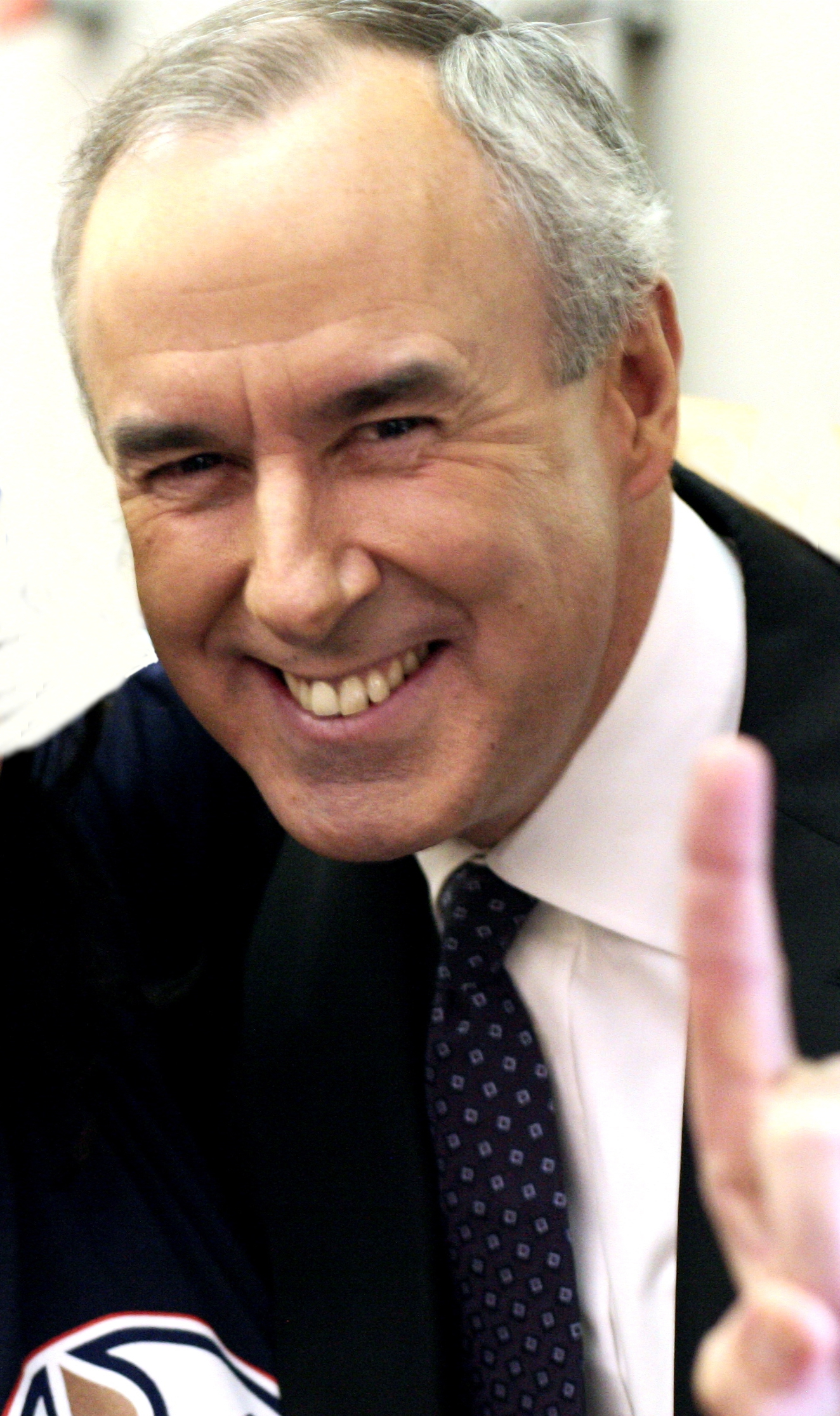
Don Cherry (left) was host of the show from its 1982 inception until 2019, Ron MacLean (right) since 1986.

Cherry was hired by the Canadian Broadcasting Corporation (CBC) in 1980 by Ralph Mellanby, executive producer of Hockey Night in Canada (HNIC), to be an analyst for the 1980 Stanley Cup playoffs. He was hired full-time for the following season as a colour commentator, but his habit of cheering for particular teams and his lack of impartiality led to his dismissal from the role; Coach's Corner was created as a result, and was hosted by Dave Hodge and Cherry. Ron MacLean was hired in 1986 and replaced Hodge. Cherry earned "about $1 million", negotiating contracts that were less than market value for his services in discussions lasting "about 90 seconds". Editorial control of Hockey Night in Canada was the responsibility of MacLaren Advertising/Canadian Sports Network in the 1960s and 1970s, and of Ohlmeyer Communications and Molstar in the 1980s.

When Rogers Media acquired control of HNIC following the company's 2013 acquisition of Canadian NHL broadcast rights (from 2014 to 2026), rumours of Cherry's impending dismissal from the broadcast were predicted, but Coach's Corner and both Cherry and MacLean were retained, albeit with a segment reduced from seven minutes to five. During a November 2013 show in the final year of CBC's broadcast, Cherry stated that Rogers Media should not "try and ruin a good thing, just leave us alone, and we'll be just as good next year". In an interview earlier that week, he had stated that "They've been saying that for 30 years...I know I'm No. 1 and Coach's Corner is No. 1 and what are you going to do?"

During the first few years of Rogers Media control, Cherry and his bosses frequently argued, and during the 2014–15 NHL season, he had an on-air outburst complaining about the reduction of broadcast time for Coach's Corner. Rogers Media also cut all other appearances by Cherry on HNIC broadcasts, restricting him to Coach's Corner.

In a 2017 interview with The New York Times, Cherry stated that other hockey television hosts "know all the stats, they know all the players, the whole deal" but that he "can pick out things no one else picks out". Scott Moore, president of Rogers Sportsnet, had stated that he had "never met anybody who has a keener eye for the game".

== Broadcast ==
Throughout the week, Cherry and MacLean prepared notes and sent producer Kathy Broderick a list of video clips to prepare for broadcast. Broderick would send them both an email on Friday morning, then MacLean would call Cherry at 9:30 Saturday morning to finalize the list of clips for that night's broadcast. Every Saturday for 33 years, Cherry answered the call with "Don's Bicycle Shop, Big Wheel Don talking", a gag carried over from his coaching days with the Boston Bruins when Bobby Orr once answered the phone in Cherry's office with "Don's Bicycle Shop". They spoke for about half an hour. He did not leave his house in the morning. Late each Saturday morning, Cherry concluded a telephone conversation with Broderick with the phrase "I'm going to be brilliant as usual". Cherry would not eat after 13:00, only drinking coffee, and would take an afternoon nap.

At about 17:00, preparations began during story meetings that cover the entirety of the Hockey Night in Canada broadcast, including the pre-game show, Hockey Central Saturday, and Headlines. MacLean and Cherry arrived on the set at about 17:30, and reviewed highlights from the previous week's games. Cherry then sat in his set seat, and the crew adjusted lighting and camera angle for his suit. When the game began, MacLean and Cherry sat in a viewing room alone until the first intermission.

Coach's Corner used a set independent from the rest of the HNIC broadcast, which resulted in Cherry never encountering HNIC's hosts and panelists. The set was created because Cherry was uncomfortable with the presence of a full crew and preferred a quiet set and refused an earpiece to receive instructions or notes from the producer. During the broadcast, only Cherry, MacLean, and the camera operator were on the set. Cherry has stated this was because he was not a professional broadcaster and was distracted by the presence of other personnel.

Originally, the show featured a discussion of the first period of the game that was airing, followed by highlights of games from the previous week. With the increasing availability of video highlights from numerous online sports resources, such highlights became increasingly stale by the time they would air on Saturday night, so the show shifted its focus to more obscure and specific elements of the game for Cherry to analyse.

General and special interest hockey stories were covered on the show. During the final broadcast of the 2017–18 NHL regular season, Coach's Corner was devoted to the Humboldt Broncos bus crash, which Cherry described as a "national nightmare".

Cherry sometimes preceded his commentary with "I'm going to get in trouble for this" before making statements that might not be politically correct.

Cherry reviewed the segment after it aired, and once again at home, making minor complaints to Broderick about the production.

The opening sequence featured Blue, a Bull Terrier Cherry received as a gift from Boston Bruins players.

=== Cherry's suits ===
A still shot from 22 April 2017 broadcast in which Cherry wore the "blood spray" suit

Cherry has become famous for the suits he wore during Coach's Corner. The suits were tailored at The Coop in northern Toronto, which assumed the role following the death of Cherry's longtime tailor. Cherry selected the material at Fabricland, which was styled at The Coop, then sent to a factory for tailoring. Up to five yards of material were used for each suit to ensure that elements align properly.

In April 2017, Toronto Life published an article rating that season's suits "from least to most offensive". Among them was a jacket he wore for the 22 April 2017 broadcast that many likened to spattered blood. He apologized during an interview the next day, saying that he had read social media postings stating it was symbolic of Cherry "murdering the English language", and referring to him as Dexter. During an interview on The Morning Show in December 2018, he stated that there were several suits he regretted wearing, but the "blood spray" suit was the most memorable. Entertainment Tonight Canada published a list of Cherry's most memorable suits in February 2019.

During a November 2018 broadcast, Hockey Night in Canada conducted a Retro Jacket auction to raise funds for Hockey Fights Cancer. One of Cherry's blazers was auctioned for $23,550, and one worn by MacLean was auctioned for $17,941.

=== Advocacy ===
Cherry had used the show to promote rule changes. For example, he campaigned for no-touch icing in order to reduce injuries caused as a result of players colliding at the end boards when chasing the puck. When the rule was implemented, he criticized referees who improperly called the rule. He also campaigned for modifications to the protective equipment players wear to make it cause less injuries, rapping a hard plastic elbow pad on the table on air to make his point.

He criticized coaches for in-game replacement of a goalie performing poorly, instead of doing so during an intermission.

He often targeted his messages to children, and proposed changes to children's hockey, such as requiring children's hockey leagues to use smaller pucks instead of those used by adults. He stated that young children have trouble handling the 6-ounce (170 g) NHL regulation-sized pucks. On the show, he may preface comments to children with "You kids" or "You young kids"; for example, in a November 2014 show, he stated "I'm going to show you kids, you young goalies, how to act and how not to act" in a segment showing clips of NHL goalies.

During the first intermission of game 2 of the 2018 Stanley Cup Final between the Washington Capitals and Vegas Golden Knights, MacLean invited NHL Commissioner Gary Bettman, who was standing nearby, to participate in the segment. Cherry had stated that the league should expand to Quebec City, and that there has never been another rivalry in any sport like that between the Montreal Canadiens and the Quebec Nordiques. Bettman stated that Cherry's "popularity just went up in Quebec".

== Criticism ==
Cherry's strong opinions at times led to repercussions, including several attempts by the CBC to fire him. In the early 1980s, as a result of his inability to pronounce names and for "butchering the language", CBC executives were prepared to fire him but refrained when Mellanby told them he would quit if Cherry was fired. Columnists have referred to him as a troglodyte and a misogynist for the views he expresses on the show. In 2004, the CBC tested running Coach's Corner on a seven-second delay after he made "inappropriate and reprehensible personal" statements on 24 January 2004 broadcast. He has stated that National Hockey League rule changes to limit fighting in the game, particularly the instigator rule, were made because "nerds don't want fighting" and that the lack of protection by enforcers of star players is why there is an increasing prevalence of injuries to the latter, and wanted enforcers in the game so that star players such as Connor McDavid would not have to fight. The segment was also criticized for being a dominant presence on Hockey Night in Canada, and for focusing primarily on issues of interest to Cherry.

He often used Coach's Corner to express some of his right-wing conservative views and Canadian nationalism and paid tribute to Canadian law enforcement and the military. He has also endorsed conservative political candidates, and has made many references to "left-wing pinkos". In 2003, the hosts devoted an entire show to discussing the federal government's decision to refrain from participating in the 2003 invasion of Iraq and the Iraq War led by the United States. The annual broadcast preceding or on Remembrance Day included a video clip of Cherry walking in a "war cemetery in France that's full of Canadian soldiers".

Pat Hickey, writing for the Montreal Gazette in 2014, stated that Coach's Corner is not the appropriate forum to honour the military or to discuss politics. In a February 2018 broadcast, Cherry stated that people who believe climate change are "cuckaloos", eliciting a response from Catherine McKenna, the federal Minister of Environment and Climate Change. In a broadcast in 2008, he had referred to environmentalist David Suzuki as a "left-wing kook".

Some of his proclamations on the show have been criticized for insulting Quebecois and European players, some of whom he has regarded as "soft". He has stated that Americans are ruining the NHL.

In a 2011 article in Maisonneuve, Mike Spry stated that Coach's Corner is "a caricature of sports commentary", describing it as a comedy and parody that is better suited to Saturday Night Live. He also called for Cherry and MacLean to be fired.

In a 2014 article for Postmedia News, Scott Stinson stated that the segment is "tinged with xenophobia".

=== Cherry's removal from Hockey Night in Canada and the end of Coach's Corner ===
On 9 November 2019, Cherry made remarks during Coach's Corner suggesting that Canadian immigrants benefit from the sacrifices of veterans and do not wear remembrance poppies. He remarked, "You people that come here... you love our way of life, you love our milk and honey, at least you can pay a couple bucks for a poppy or something like that... These guys paid for your way of life that you enjoy in Canada, these guys paid the biggest price." Sportsnet apologized for the remarks, stating that his comments were discriminatory and offensive, and that they "do not represent our values and what we stand for as a network." His co-host, Ron MacLean also apologized via Twitter, expressing regret for his actions and for allowing Cherry make the comments. The NHL also released a statement on Cherry's comments saying "the comments made last night were offensive and contrary to the values we believe in." Cherry later told the Toronto Sun that he would not apologize for his comments stating "I have had my say".

The Canadian Broadcast Standards Council (CBSC) stated that its internal systems had been overloaded by a high number of complaints. Two days later, on 11 November, Remembrance Day, Sportsnet president Bart Yabsley announced that "following further discussions with Don Cherry after Saturday night's broadcast, it has been decided it is the right time for him to immediately step down". Speaking to the Toronto Sun, Cherry commented "I know what I said and I meant it. Everybody in Canada should wear a poppy to honour our fallen soldiers... I would have liked to continue doing Coach's Corner. The problem is if I have to watch everything I say, it isn't Coach's Corner". He later said that if he had to do it again, he would have said "everybody".

On 16 November 2019, MacLean addressed and reflected on the incident during Hockey Night in Canada, the first without Cherry, also announcing that Coach's Corner is no more.

Following the firing of Cherry, Numeris figures showed a slumping in the viewership of Hockey Night in Canada. When the NHL season opened in October, the first Saturday night game featuring the Toronto Maple Leafs and Montreal Canadiens drew an average audience of 1.247 million. Cherry's last broadcast on 9 November, a game that featured the Maple Leafs playing the Philadelphia Flyers, drew an average audience of 1.027 million; in the two weeks following Cherry's dismissal the eastern broadcast of Hockey Night in Canada failed to make the Numeris Top 30 ranked TV shows. On 13 December, the main game drew an average audience of 810,000 compared to 983,000 for the same weekend in 2018.

== Awards ==
Coach's Corner was nominated for a Best Sports Program or Series for the 22nd Gemini Awards in 2007.

== In popular culture ==
The album Supporting Caste by the Canadian punk rock band Propagandhi includes the song "Dear Coach's Corner", in which the singer directs questions to MacLean, asking for someone to explain the convergence of military rituals and hockey to his niece. It also refers to Cherry's ideology as "A strange and bitter fruit, that sad old man beside you keeps feeding to young minds as virtue".

The show and its hosts have been parodied a number of times, including by This Hour Has 22 Minutes and the Twitter account DonCherryParody.

A review of the weekly show was printed in the Toronto Sun in a segment named Cherry Pickin'.

In November 2015, Cherry and MacLean were inducted into Canada's Walk of Fame. They unveiled their star on King Street West of Toronto's Entertainment District in July 2016.

== See also ==
- List of inductees of Canada's Walk of Fame
