= Dixie Beehives (2005–2011) =

Canadian junior ice hockey team in Ontario

- City: Oswego, New York, United States; Etobicoke, Ontario, Canada; Weston, Ontario, Canada
- League: Ontario Junior Hockey League
- Operated: 2005–2011
- Home arena: Romney Field House Ice Rink (Oswego 2005–2007); Weston Arena (2007–2009); Canlan Ice Sports Etobicoke (2009–2011)
- Colours: Red, Gold and Black
- General manager: Louie Gialedakis
- Head coach: Louie Gialedakis
- Affiliates: Mississauga Hornets (GTHL)

Franchise history
- 2005–2007: Oswego Admirals
- 2007–2009: Toronto Dixie Beehives
- 2009–2011: Dixie Beehives

The Dixie Beehives were a Canadian Junior "A" ice hockey team from Etobicoke, Ontario. They were a part of the Ontario Junior Hockey League. The team originated in Oswego, New York as the Oswego Admirals.

== History ==
=== Oswego Admirals 2005–2007 ===
The Dixie Beehives began as the Oswego Admirals, a Junior A team in the east Division of the OPJHL in 2005 out of Oswego, New York.

The Admirals were owned by the same man who owned the Syracuse Jr. Crunch, but are not the same franchise as the Crunch as they currently play in the United States. Their first season went well as they earned a berth into the playoffs. Nine games under .500 on the season, the Admirals did not survive past the first round of their first season.

Admirals

The Admirals' first ever game was a 3–1 loss to the Kingston Voyageurs on September 8, 2005. During that game, the franchise's first ever goal was scored by Jason Deluca. The goalie to start this historic game was Mark Schacker. The Admirals' first home game took place on September 22, 2006—a 2–2 tie with the Cobourg Cougars. Evan Lucas scored the Admirals' first ever home goal while Cory Gershon picked up the tie in net. Their first win was also against the Kingston Voyageurs at home, a 5–2 victory on September 23, 2005. Corey Callen scored the eventual game-winning-goal and Gershon stopped 30 of 32 shots for that first team victory.

After a good second season and a first round exit to the Port Hope Predators that was shortened by bad weather.

=== Toronto Dixie Beehives / Dixie Beehives 2007–2011 ===
The Toronto Dixie Beehives began play at Weston Arena on September 15 with a game vs. the Vaughan Vipers. The first season saw the team make the playoffs before going down 3 straight to the Markham Waxers in the quarter-final match.

In the summer of 2009, the Beehives relocated from Weston to Etobicoke playing at Canlan Ice Sports Etobicoke and dropped "Toronto" from their name. On April 3, 2011, the Dixie Beehives officially ceased operations.

== Season-by-season results ==
Season	GP	W	L	T	OTL	GF	GA	P	Results	Playoffs
2005–06	49	17	26	4	2	150	193	40	6th OPJHL-E	Lost Conf. QF
2006–07	49	19	25	2	3	154	188	43	6th OPJHL-E	Lost Conf. QF
2007–08	49	17	27	-	5	175	248	39	6th OPJHL-S	Lost Conf. QF
2008–09	49	17	30	-	2	147	200	36	7th OJHL-P	
2009–10	50	12	37	-	1	146	241	25	10th CCHL-W	DNQ
2010–11	50	4	43	-	3	133	350	11	8th OJHL-S	DNQ
