= Canlan Ice Sports Etobicoke =

Hockey facility in Toronto, Ontario, Canada

Coordinates: 43°42′00″N 79°34′35″W

Canlan Ice Sports Etobicoke is a four-pad hockey facility located at Ontario Highway 409 and Martin Grove Road in Etobicoke, Toronto, Ontario, Canada. The arena is owned and operated by Canlan Ice Sports Corporation, of Burnaby, British Columbia. Canlan Ice Sports Corporation is a publicly traded company on the Toronto Stock Exchange with the call letters ICE. Canlan Ice Sports Etobicoke is one of five arena complexes in the Greater Toronto Area owned by the Canlan Ice Sports Corporation, with the other four locations in North York, Scarborough, Oshawa, and Oakville.

The arena is home to the Toronto Marlboros Minor Hockey Organization, a member of the Greater Toronto Hockey League (GTHL). The Dixie Beehives of the Ontario Junior Hockey League played here from 2009 to 2011. Along with many others, Connor McDavid, John Tavares, and Jack Hughes have all played at Canlan Ice Sports Etobicoke, during their tenures with the Toronto Marlboros Minor Hockey Organization.

The facility was a Gold Award winner of the 2007 Toronto Sun Readers' Choice Award in the category of the Recreational Hockey Arena. Along with the four ice pads, the arena complex contains a hockey equipment shop, a goalie training facility, and a sports bar/ lounge area.
