= Don Cherry =

Canadian ice hockey player, coach, and commentator

Don Cherry OOnt
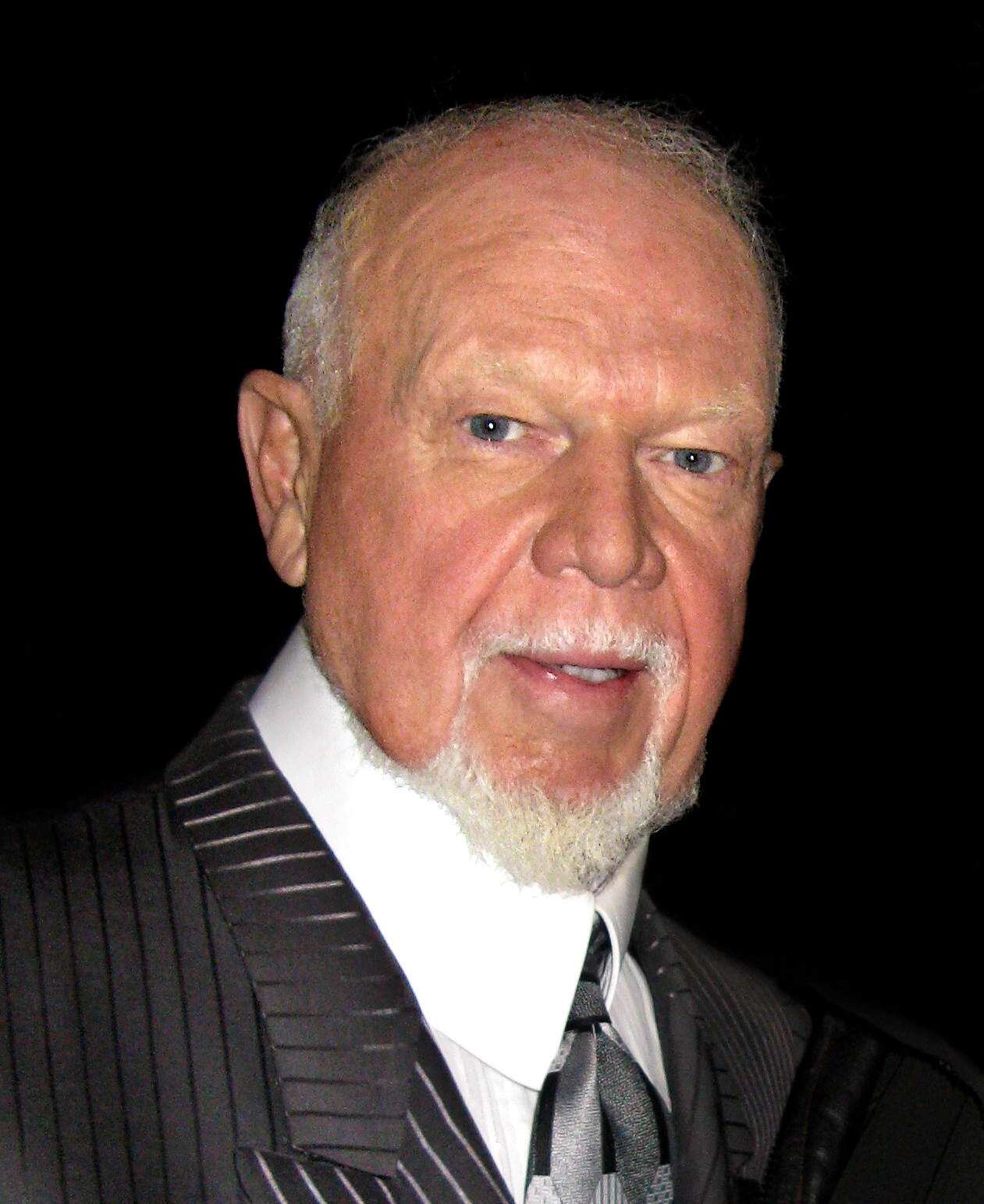
- Cherry in 2010
- Born: February 5, 1934 (age 92) Kingston, Ontario, Canada
- Height: 5 ft 11 in (180 cm)
- Weight: 180 lb (82 kg; 12 st 12 lb)
- Position: Defence
- Shot: Left
- Played for: Boston Bruins
- Coached for: Boston Bruins; Colorado Rockies
- Playing career: 1954–1972
- Coaching career: 1971–1980

Donald Stewart Cherry OOnt (born February 5, 1934) is a Canadian former ice hockey player, coach, and television commentator. He played one game in the National Hockey League (NHL) with the Boston Bruins. After concluding a playing career in the American Hockey League (AHL), he coached the Bruins for five seasons leading the team to four division titles and two appearances in the Stanley Cup Final.

From 1986 to 2019, Cherry co-hosted Coach's Corner—a segment aired during CBC's Saturday-night NHL broadcast Hockey Night in Canada, with Ron MacLean. Nicknamed Grapes, he is known for his outspoken manner and opinions, and his flamboyant dress. By the 2018–19 NHL season, Cherry and MacLean had hosted Coach's Corner for 33 seasons. From 1984 to 2019, Cherry hosted Grapevine, a short-form radio segment with fellow sportscaster Brian Williams. He created and starred in the direct-to-video series Don Cherry's Rock'em Sock'em Hockey from 1989 to 2018.

In 2004, Cherry was voted by viewers as the seventh-greatest Canadian of all time in the CBC miniseries The Greatest Canadian. In 2010, his life was dramatized in a two-part CBC movie, Keep Your Head Up, Kid: The Don Cherry Story, based on a script written by his son, Timothy Cherry. In 2012, CBC aired a sequel, The Wrath of Grapes: The Don Cherry Story II.

Cherry has expressed controversial political views for which he has faced criticism, including remarks he made regarding Canada's lack of support for the 2003 invasion of Iraq, and denying climate change. In November 2019, Cherry was fired by Sportsnet from Hockey Night in Canada for making controversial statements that have been variously described as anti-immigration, xenophobic, or racist, about Canadian immigrants during his show.

== Early life and family ==
Cherry was born in Kingston, Ontario, to Delmar (Del) and Maude Cherry. His paternal grandfather, Sub/Cst. John T. (Jack) Cherry, was an original member of the North-West Mounted Police (now Royal Canadian Mounted Police), and a Great Lakes ship captain. His maternal grandfather, Richard Palamountain, was a British orphan of Cornish parentage who emigrated to Canada as one of the Home Children. The name, Palamountain, is a corruption of the Cornish language "pol-mun-tyr" meaning "pool by the mineral land". Palamountain was also a veteran of the Canadian Expeditionary Force. Cherry's father Del was an amateur athlete and worked as an electrician with the Canadian Steamship Lines. On the March 15, 2008, edition of Coach's Corner, Cherry wore the green and gold colours of County Kerry, Ireland. In his segment following the game, he claimed ancestry from that region. Cherry's younger brother, Dick Cherry played hockey at various levels, including two seasons in the National Hockey League with the Philadelphia Flyers.

In his first year with the Hershey Bears of the American Hockey League, he met his future wife Rosemarie (Rose) Cherry née Madelyn Martini (born 1935 in Hershey, Pennsylvania). Rose was hugely influential in Don's life—because of Don's minor-league hockey lifestyle, they moved 53 times; they rarely had decent housing or furnishings, and Don was often away playing during major events, such as the birth of their daughter and first child, Cindy Cherry. Six years after Cindy's birth, Rose gave birth to son Tim Cherry. When Tim needed a kidney transplant at age 13, Cindy donated one of hers. As of 2006, the two lived across the street from each other, around the corner from their father, in Mississauga.

Rose died of liver cancer on June 1, 1997, and in honour of her perseverance, Don created Rose Cherry's Home for Kids. Her name has motivated Cherry to always wear a rose on his lapel. Cherry contributed to developing Rose Cherry's Home for Kids which has since been renamed to The Darling Home for Kids, in Milton, Ontario. The Mississauga Sports and Entertainment Centre in Mississauga, is located on Rose Cherry Place, a street named for his late wife.

In 1999, Don married his second wife, Luba.

== Playing career ==
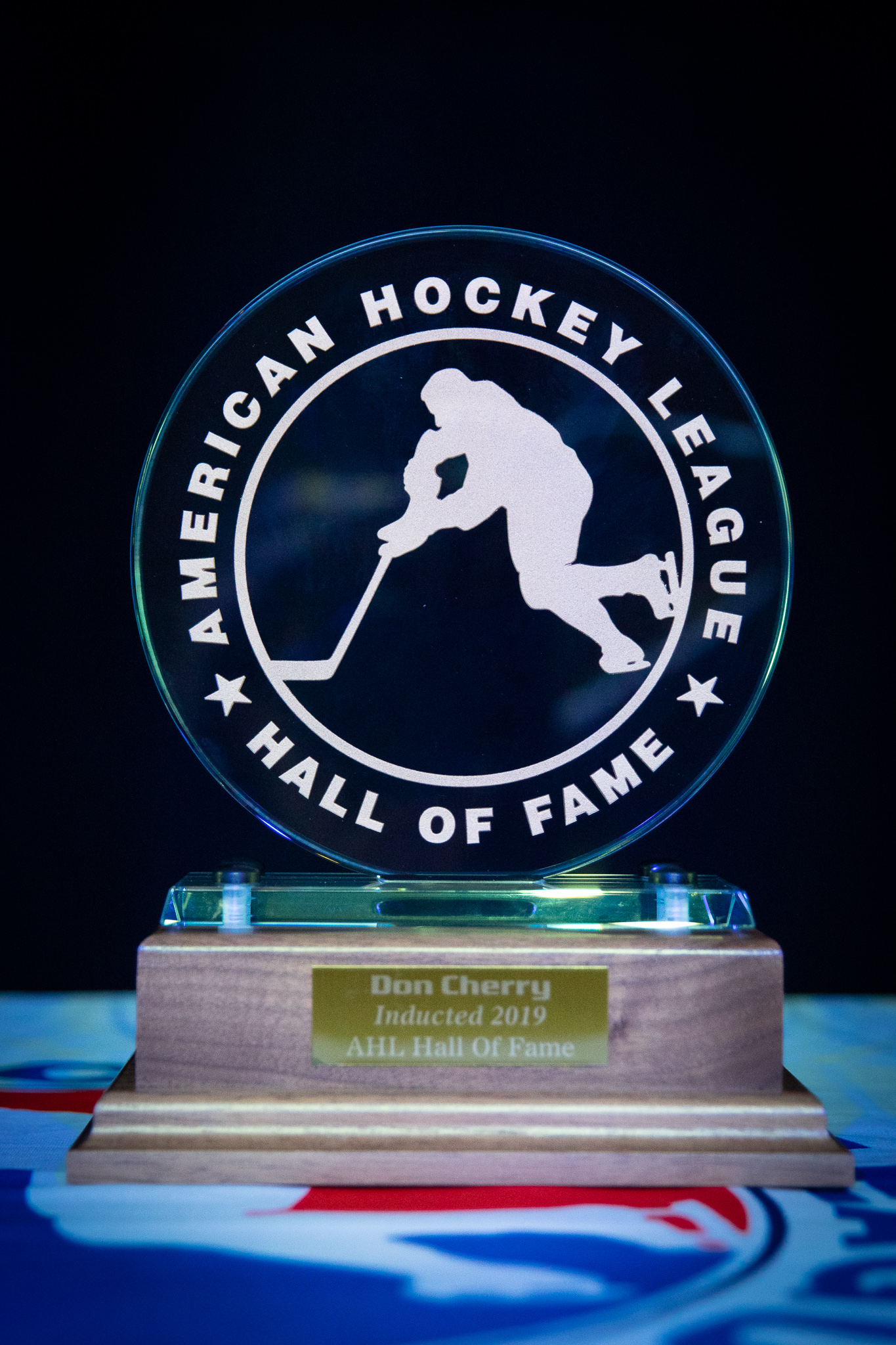
Cherry was inducted into the American Hockey League Hall of Fame in 2019.

Cherry played junior ice hockey with the Barrie Flyers and the Windsor Spitfires in the Ontario Hockey Association. Cherry won the Memorial Cup while playing defence in Barrie in 1953. He dropped out of high school, and in 1954 he signed with the American Hockey League's (AHL) Hershey Bears.

Cherry had a long playing career in professional minor hockey, and in 1955 played his only NHL game when the Boston Bruins called him up during the playoffs. According to Cherry, a baseball injury suffered in the off-season kept him from making the NHL, despite his almost 20 years playing in the minor leagues. He retired as a player in 1970, but came out of retirement two years later to play 19 final games with the Rochester Americans. Cherry won the Calder Cup championship (AHL) four times—1960 with the Springfield Indians, and 1965, 1966, 1968 with Rochester. He also won the Lester Patrick Cup, the Western Hockey League Championship, with the Vancouver Canucks in 1969.

=== Regular season and playoffs ===
			Regular season					Playoffs
Season	Team	League	GP	G	A	Pts	PIM	GP	G	A	Pts	PIM
1951–52	Windsor Spitfires	OHA	18	0	3	3	30	—	—	—	—	—
1951–52	Barrie Flyers	OHA	18	2	3	5	30	—	—	—	—	—
1952–53	Barrie Flyers	OHA	56	5	3	8	66	25	4	3	7	46
1953–54	Barrie Flyers	OHA	55	10	14	24	61	—	—	—	—	—
1954–55	Hershey Bears	AHL	63	7	13	20	125	—	—	—	—	—
1954–55	Boston Bruins	NHL	—	—	—	—	—	1	0	0	0	0
1955–56	Hershey Bears	AHL	58	3	22	25	102	—	—	—	—	—
1956–57	Hershey Bears	AHL	64	5	20	25	197	7	2	0	2	27
1957–58	Springfield Indians	AHL	65	9	17	26	83	13	1	1	2	10
1958–59	Springfield Indians	AHL	70	6	22	28	118	—	—	—	—	—
1959–60	Springfield Indians	AHL	46	2	11	13	45	1	0	0	0	2
1959–60	Trois-Rivières Lions	EPHL	23	3	4	7	12	7	0	1	1	2
1960–61	Kitchener-Waterloo Beavers	EPHL	70	13	26	39	78	7	0	3	3	23
1961–62	Sudbury Wolves	EPHL	55	9	20	29	62	5	3	2	5	10
1961–62	Springfield Indians	AHL	11	1	3	4	10	—	—	—	—	—
1962–63	Spokane Comets	WHL	68	9	13	22	68	—	—	—	—	—
1963–64	Rochester Americans	AHL	70	5	11	16	106	2	0	0	0	4
1964–65	Rochester Americans	AHL	62	4	8	12	56	10	0	1	1	34
1965–66	Tulsa Oilers	CHL	17	1	2	3	28	—	—	—	—	—
1965–66	Rochester Americans	AHL	56	5	11	16	61	12	2	5	7	14
1966–67	Rochester Americans	AHL	72	6	24	30	61	13	1	2	3	16
1967–68	Rochester Americans	AHL	68	6	15	21	74	11	1	1	2	2
1968–69	Rochester Americans	AHL	43	7	11	18	20	—	—	—	—	—
1968–69	Vancouver Canucks	WHL	33	0	6	6	29	8	2	2	4	6
1971–72	Rochester Americans	AHL	19	1	4	5	8	—	—	—	—	—
NHL totals			—	—	—	—	—	1	0	0	0	0
AHL totals			767	67	192	259	1,066	69	7	10	17	109

== Coaching career ==
After the end of the 1968–69 season, his playing career was essentially over. Cherry struggled for a time as a Cadillac salesman and a construction worker. He worked as a house painter earning $2 per hour.

In the middle of the 1971–72 season, Cherry became the coach of the American Hockey League's Rochester Americans. The following year, the title of General Manager was added. In his third season behind the bench, Cherry was voted the league's Coach of the Year.

=== Boston Bruins ===
After his three-year stint in Rochester, he was promoted to the NHL as head coach of the Boston Bruins for the 1974–75 season. The Bruins were coming off a successful run of two Stanley Cups and three first-place finishes, but after Cherry's first season as coach the team would see the exit of superstars Bobby Orr and Phil Esposito.

Cherry quickly developed a reputation for being an eccentric, flamboyant coach who strongly encouraged physical play among his players. According to Cherry, he moulded the Bruins' playing style after that of his dog, Blue, a feisty bullterrier. While the team had been known for Orr and Esposito who were highly skilled scorers, the 1975–76 Bruins started the season in brief slump in part due to Orr's knee injury that saw him play only ten games, plus Orr would become a free agent at the end of the season. Cherry remade the team with enforcers and grinders which became known as the "lunch-pail gang" (or "lunch pail A.C.") and "the Big Bad Bruins", with Esposito and Carol Vadnais being traded to the New York Rangers for Brad Park and Jean Ratelle, as Esposito disagreed with Cherry's coaching including having a disinclination to backcheck. This approach of "balance over brilliance" rejuvenated the Bruins, in particular the careers of Park and Ratelle, as they continued to be one of the NHL's best teams during the latter half of the 1970s, capturing the Adams division title four straight seasons from 1975–76 through 1978–79, with Cherry winning the Jack Adams Award (NHL coach of the year) for the 1975 season. In the 1977–78 season, Cherry coached the Bruins team to an NHL record of 11 players with 20 goals or more on a single team.

The Bruins were able to defeat the rough Philadelphia Flyers twice in the playoffs under Cherry's tenure. The Bruins made the Stanley Cup finals twice, both times losing to their arch-rivals, the Montreal Canadiens, in both 1977 and 1978. The late 1970s Canadiens were one of the most dominant teams in the NHL, with three of their eight regular losses in the 1976–77 season coming at the hands of the Bruins. In the 1979 semi-final playoff series against the Canadiens, Cherry's Bruins pushed the series to the limit but they were undone by a late penalty in the seventh game. Up by a goal with less than three minutes left in the seventh game, the Bruins were called for having too many men on the ice, which he blamed on himself, saying later "The guy couldn't have heard me yell. I grabbed two other guys trying to go over the boards. That would have made eight on the ice." The Canadiens' Guy Lafleur scored the tying goal on the subsequent power play, and ultimately the Canadiens won the game in overtime. Montreal went on to defeat the New York Rangers for their fourth straight Cup title. Cherry, who had an uneasy relationship with Bruins General Manager Harry Sinden, was fired by the Bruins afterward.

=== Colorado Rockies ===
Cherry went on to coach the Colorado Rockies in the 1979–80 season. Under his tenure, the Rockies adopted the motto "Come to the fights and watch a Rockies game break out!" and the slogan could be seen on billboards all over Denver throughout the season.

However, as he later admitted, his outspokenness and feuding with Rockies general manager Ray Miron did not endear Cherry to management. While Cherry did much to motivate the players, goaltending was still the team's weakness as Miron refused to replace Hardy Åström, whom Cherry dubbed "The Swedish Sieve". Cherry recalled one game where his players had taken ten shots on goal without scoring, but Åström then conceded a goal from the opponent's first shot and so was yanked from net.

In a late-season game in Chicago, the Blackhawks scored the game-winning goal while Mike McEwen, a favourite of the Rockies owners, was on the ice. When McEwen returned to the bench, Cherry grabbed him by the jersey and shook him. McEwen left the team for several days and did not return until after meeting with Miron and the club owners. Cherry's belief, stated later, was that the owners had promised McEwen that Cherry would be fired after the season.

The Rockies finished with a league-worst 19–48–13 record, also the worst single-season mark of Cherry's coaching career. He was fired six weeks after the season ended.

=== Team Canada, Saskatoon Blues, Mississauga IceDogs ===
Internationally, Cherry was an assistant coach for Team Canada at the 1976 Canada Cup and was head coach for Canada's team at the 1981 World Championships in Gothenburg, Sweden.

In 1983 Cherry agreed to become the new head coach of the Saskatoon Blues, Bill Hunter's proposed relocation of the St. Louis Blues to Saskatoon, Saskatchewan. However, the NHL's Board of Governors rejected the move on May 18, 1983, and the Blues remained in St. Louis.

Cherry was involved with the Ontario Hockey League's Mississauga IceDogs as part-owner from 1998—2002 and as the coach from 2001—2002. As owner and general manager, he gained notoriety by refusing to take part in the CHL import draft, and by only playing North American-born players. The IceDogs' first three seasons were difficult ones with the team winning a total of 16 games combined. Cherry took over coaching duties in the fourth season after firing Rick Vaive and hiring himself as replacement. During Cherry's one season as head coach of the IceDogs, the team managed 11 victories (only a slight improvement) and failed to make the playoffs for the fourth straight year. Cherry drew some criticism for his sudden decision to allow European-born players onto the IceDogs line-up during the one season he coached the team.

=== Head coaching record ===
==== NHL ====
Team	Year	Regular season						Postseason			
Team	Year	G	W	L	T	Pts	Finish	W	L	Win %	Result
BOS	1974–75	80	40	26	14	94	2nd in Adams	1	2	.333	Lost in preliminary round (CHI)
BOS	1975–76	80	48	15	17	113	1st in Adams	5	7	.417	Lost in semifinals (PHI)
BOS	1976–77	80	49	23	8	106	1st in Adams	8	6	.571	Lost in Stanley Cup Finals (MTL)
BOS	1977–78	80	51	18	11	113	1st in Adams	10	5	.667	Lost in Stanley Cup Finals (MTL)
BOS	1978–79	80	43	23	14	100	1st in Adams	7	4	.636	Lost in semifinals (MTL)
BOS total		400	231	105	64	526		31	24	.564	5 playoff appearances
CLR	1979–80	80	19	48	13	51	6th in Smythe	—	—	—	Missed playoffs
CLR total		80	19	48	13	51		—	—	—	No playoff appearances
Total		480	250	153	77	577		31	24	.564	5 playoff appearances

==== Minor leagues ====
AHL
Team	Year	Regular season						Postseason			
Team	Year	G	W	L	T	Pts	Finish	W	L	Win %	Result
Rochester Americans	1971–72	39	16	18	5	37	5th in East	—	—	—	Missed playoffs
Rochester Americans	1972–73	76	33	31	12	78	3rd in East	2	4	.333	Lost in division semifinals
Rochester Americans	1973–74	76	42	21	13	97	1st in North	2	4	.333	Lost in division semifinals
Rochester total		191	91	70	30	212		4	8	.333	2 playoff appearances

== Broadcasting career ==
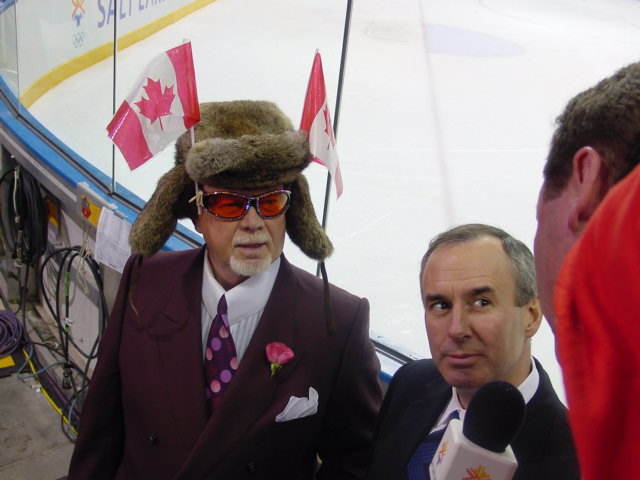
Cherry with Ron MacLean at the 2002 Winter Olympics. The two were partnered on Coach's Corner from 1986 to 2019.

After the Colorado Rockies failed to qualify for the 1980 Stanley Cup playoffs, Cherry was hired as a studio analyst for CBC's playoff coverage that spring, working alongside host Dave Hodge. CBC hired him full-time in 1981 as a colour commentator, but he didn't last long in that role due to his tendency to openly cheer for one of the teams playing, especially the Boston Bruins or Toronto Maple Leafs. Instead, Coach's Corner was created, a segment that appeared in the first intermission on Hockey Night in Canada, with Dave Hodge. In 1986, Hodge was replaced by Ron MacLean.

From 1984 to 2019, Cherry co-hosted Don Cherry's Grapeline with Brian Williams, first on CFRB radio in Toronto and its sister stations, moving in 1994 to The FAN 590 and the Sportsnet Radio network. At its peak, the show was carried on over 100 stations across Canada and on several stations in the United States.

For several years he also hosted his half-hour interview show, Don Cherry's Grapevine, which began on Hamilton's CHCH-TV in the 1980s before moving to TSN. His loud, outspoken nature became notorious, and his shows are described as "game analysis, cultural commentary and playful parrying with host Ron MacLean."

Cherry also hosted a syndicated weekly television show called Don Cherry's This Week in Hockey during the 1987–88 NHL season. It featured highlights from the previous week's NHL games. The highlight of each show was when Cherry awarded a Black and Decker cordless drill to the player who levied the "hit of the week" (called the "Drill of the Week" to tie into the cordless drill giveaway).

Branching out from his Hockey Night in Canada duties, Cherry began to release a series of videos called Don Cherry's Rock'em Sock'em Hockey in 1989.

In 1989, he referred to Finnish-born Winnipeg Jets assistant coach Alpo Suhonen as "some kind of dog food", triggering the threat of a lawsuit from Jets owner Barry Shenkarow.

The 15th-anniversary video of Rock'em Sock'em Hockey was released in 2003, with a 'Best Of' released in 2005.

In January 2004, during Coach's Corner, Cherry claimed that players who wore visors were more likely to commit high-sticking infractions. He also said, "Most of the guys that wear them are Europeans and French [Canadian] guys". This statement triggered an investigation by the federal Official Languages Commissioner and protests by French Canadians. CBC consequently imposed a seven-second delay on Hockey Night in Canada. In a subsequent analysis of 82 NHL games for 12 days, CBC Sports Online discovered that high-sticking infractions were committed far more often by players not wearing visors, at a rate of nearly 2 to 1.

Cherry returned to the Coach's Corner for the 2005–06 NHL season without the seven-second delay.

For the 2007 Stanley Cup Finals, NBC decided to feature Cherry in its intermission coverage, a rare appearance on American television. He was partnered with Bill Clement and Brett Hull and it did not conflict with his usual role on CBC as he appeared on NBC during the second intermission.

In May 2008, ESPN announced that Cherry was joining Barry Melrose as a commentator for the remainder of the 2008 NHL Playoffs. He provided pre-game analysis for the conference finals, pre- and post-game analysis for the Stanley Cup finals, and appeared on ESPNews and ESPN Radio. ESPN also announced that he would donate his fees to the Humane Society.

Cherry's commentary was usually peppered with quotables and catchphrases like "All you kids out there...," unrestrained affection for his favourite players (including Steve Yzerman and Kingston native Doug Gilmour, whom Cherry affectionately referred to as "Dougie" and once kissed on-air in a famous TV gag), and overall political incorrectness. He was known for his signature style which included colourful jackets, shirts, and ties he wore during the "Coach's Corner" segment of Hockey Night in Canada.

=== Removal from Hockey Night in Canada ===
On November 9, 2019, during Coach's Corner, Cherry complained that Canadian immigrants benefit from the sacrifices of veterans and do not wear remembrance poppies. He said, "You people that come here ... you love our way of life, you love our milk and honey, at least you can pay a couple bucks for a poppy or something like that ... These guys paid for your way of life that you enjoy in Canada, these guys paid the biggest price." These comments were widely condemned as being racist. The distributor of those poppies in Canada, The Royal Canadian Legion, officially denounced those statements saying, "Mr. Cherry's personal opinion was hurtful, divisive and in no way condoned by the Legion." Sportsnet apologized, stating the remarks were discriminatory, offensive, and "do not represent our values and what we stand for". Co-host Ron MacLean apologized via Twitter for allowing Cherry to make the comments. The NHL released a statement saying "the comments made last night were offensive and contrary to the values we believe in". Cherry later told the Toronto Sun that he would not apologize for his comments, stating, "I have had my say."

The Canadian Broadcast Standards Council (CBSC) stated that its internal systems had been overloaded by a high number of complaints. Two days later, on November 11, Sportsnet president Bart Yabsley announced that Cherry had been fired: "Following further discussions with Don Cherry after Saturday night's broadcast, it has been decided it is the right time for him to immediately step down." Speaking to the Toronto Sun, Cherry commented, "I know what I said and I meant it. Everybody in Canada should wear a poppy to honour our fallen soldiers ... I would have liked to continue doing Coach's Corner. The problem is if I have to watch everything I say, it isn't Coach's Corner." He later said that if he had to do it again, he would have said "everybody".

On November 16, 2019, MacLean addressed and reflected on the incident during Hockey Night in Canada, the first without Cherry, also announcing the end of Coach's Corner.

Former Boston Bruins defenceman Bobby Orr defended Cherry, calling his firing "disgraceful". Colorado Avalanche forward Nazem Kadri said "People maybe took it out of context a little bit. I know Grapes is a great person and am sad to see him go."

=== Later career ===
On November 19, 2019, Cherry released his first installment of Grapevine, this time as a podcast. During his first podcast, Cherry said he was unwilling to accept Sportsnet's conditions for his return.

Cherry retired from podcasting in June 2025.

== Other ventures ==
=== Acting career ===
As part of his fame, Cherry has also branched out into acting roles. He was cast as Jake Nelson in the television series Power Play. Nelson was the coach of the Philadelphia team playing against the Hamilton Steelheads in the playoffs during the first season. Also, he and Ron MacLean provided voices for themselves in the animated series Zeroman, which starred Leslie Nielsen. He also appeared on an episode of Goosebumps called "Don't Go to Sleep!" where he plays a hockey coach. His voice was also used in Disney's animated feature The Wild, as a penguin curling broadcaster. He also appeared alongside the Trailer Park Boys in The Tragically Hip's video "The Darkest One". His voice was also used in the Mickey Mouse episode "Bad Ear Day", as an ice hockey game announcer.

In 2008, he also appeared on an episode of Holmes on Homes, the widely popular home improvement show. While not appearing scripted, Cherry lived in the neighbourhood and he is shown speaking with Mike Holmes about the construction business and the ongoing project at his brother-in-law's house.

=== Business and charitable work ===
In 1985, the first of a chain of franchised sports bars/restaurants bearing Cherry's name was opened in Hamilton. Cherry started as a partner in the operation and has more recently licensed his name to the chain without holding a significant ownership stake in the company. "Don Cherry's Sports Grill" has locations in Ontario, Nova Scotia, Newfoundland and Labrador, British Columbia, Saskatchewan and Alberta.

Cherry created the Don Cherry Pet Rescue Foundation and donates all profits from his Simply Pets snacks line to animal charities. During the 42nd Canadian Parliament, Cherry, typically a supporter of the Conservatives made a video supporting Liberal MP Nathaniel Erskine-Smith's ultimately unsuccessful private member's bill that sought to toughen animal cruelty laws.

== Opinions on hockey ==
Cherry would often complain about players that he believed were not playing hockey the "right" way, and those players were usually Québécois, Swedes, Russians, or of some other background besides English-speaking Canadians. He believes that fighting is an integral part of the game as it enforces respect between teams and players, as well as being popular with the public. He has been described as "a pioneer in the identity politics of sports."

Cherry has called Bobby Orr the greatest player of all time. Other favourites of his include Doug Gilmour, Vincent Lecavalier, and Cam Neely. Cherry has criticized many players for what he considers dishonourable conduct, but perhaps none more than Ulf Samuelsson, whom he considered to be an exceptionally dirty player.

Cherry has strongly criticized the direction taken by the National Hockey League in recent years, reducing fighting in favour of speed and skill. Specific rules that he criticizes include touch-up icing and the instigator rule.

He also frequently criticized players for elaborate celebrations after goals. In 2003, Cherry made headlines by criticizing then heavily publicized junior prospect Sidney Crosby for being a "hot dog" because of the way Crosby slid around on his knees after scoring. He also disapproved of a tricky behind-the-net goal the young star pulled off when a game was already out of reach for the team he scored on. He commented on the controversy caused by Alexander Ovechkin's celebration after he scored his 50th goal in 2009.

Along similar lines, in 2019 he criticized the Carolina Hurricanes for their on-ice victory celebrations, calling them a "bunch of jerks." The Hurricanes adopted "Bunch of Jerks" as a battle cry, even going as far as projecting it on the ice at PNC Arena before and after games.

Cherry is a staunch supporter of women's hockey, and sledge hockey. In 1997, the Canadian women's national ice hockey team paid tribute to the late Rose Cherry. Canadian Hockey chairman Bob MacKinnon thanked Cherry stating "The growing popularity of the women's game in our country owes a great deal to Don and Rose Cherry ... Don has been a strong supporter of the female game since the early 1980s and continues to speak out in favour of women's hockey. It's a pleasure for me, as chairman of Canadian Hockey, to be a part of this tribute to Rose Cherry, who was a keen supporter of female hockey herself."

== Political views ==
Over his career on television, Cherry generated significant controversy about both hockey and politics.

In 2003, Cherry made comments on his CBC segment in support of the 2003 invasion of Iraq. On March 22, 2003, Cherry criticized Montreal fans for booing the American national anthem before a game earlier in the week. The conversation then turned to the war when Ron MacLean said "everybody wants to know what you think". Cherry berated MacLean about being neutral on the war and strongly criticized the Canadian government for failing to support the U.S. in the war. Cherry appeared on the American radio program The Jim Rome Show the following week, stating, "You have to realize the CBC is government owned [...] You have to say the government was against [the invasion of Iraq] and I'm for it and I'm on a government program. I really thought this could be the end."

After appearing in the House of Commons of Canada on November 7, 2006, he formally stated his support for Prime Minister Stephen Harper, whom he called "a grinder and a mucker" by saying "I give a thumbs up to Stephen Harper for sure. He supports the troops and I support the troops."

On December 7, 2010, Cherry attended an inaugural meeting of Toronto City Council, where he placed the chain of office around incoming Mayor Rob Ford's neck. Cherry was asked to say a few remarks and he opened by stating "I'm wearing pink for all the pinkos out there that ride bicycles and everything, I thought I'd get it in." He then went on to state that he had "been ripped to shreds by the left-wing pinko newspapers out there" and ended by saying "And that's why I say he's gonna be the greatest mayor this city has ever, ever seen, as far as I'm concerned! And put that in your pipe, you left-wing kooks." Left-leaning councillors were critical of Cherry's speech, and the following day some of them wore pink clothing in protest, including Joe Mihevc and Ana Bailão, who wore pink scarves while Janet Davis wore a pink suit jacket. Mihevc said, "We all love Don Cherry and his comments and forcefulness in hockey games, but this is council. It's a political arena where we make it a habit to reach out, talk to others and achieve consensus. To have that kind of, frankly, belligerence and pushing people aside, to start out this way I think is really unfortunate." Councillor Denzil Minnan-Wong defended Cherry though he stated that it was "A little over the top" and that "You take it for what it is and you shrug it off and move forward." Cherry defended his comments by stating "Well, what can I tell you? Don't invite me. You don't invite a pit bull. If you want a pit bull, you get a pit bull." Later that month, Cherry was a guest of Rob Ford on a trip to visit Canadian troops in Afghanistan conducted by the Government of Canada, where he attended and spoke at a Christmas dinner event.

Cherry is a strong supporter of the Canadian Forces, police officers, and veterans.

In 2018, Cherry faced backlash after denying the existence of climate change and referred to people who acknowledge climate change as "cuckaloos." Environment Minister Catherine McKenna responded by saying, "For hockey you can turn to Coach's Corner if you want, for climate change, Canadians turn to scientists." Cherry has expressed similar views in the past such as during a 2008 Hockey Night in Canada broadcast when he called environmental activist David Suzuki a "left-wing kook."

In 2020, Cherry supported Donald Trump in the 2020 United States presidential election.

== Accolades ==
Cherry won the Jack Adams Award as the NHL's best coach in 1976. He was inducted into the Rochester Americans Hall of Fame in 1987. In 2019, he was inducted into the AHL Hall of Fame.

On November 14, 2005, Cherry was granted honorary membership of the Police Association of Ontario. Once an aspiring police officer, Cherry has been a longtime supporter of the police services. In June 2007, Cherry was made a Dominion Command honorary life member of the Royal Canadian Legion in recognition of "his longstanding and unswerving support of ... Canadians in uniform". In February 2008, Cherry was awarded the Canadian Forces Medallion for Distinguished Service for "unwavering support to men and women of the Canadian Forces, honouring fallen soldiers" on Coach's Corner.

In 2004, Cherry ranked at number seven on the Greatest Canadian. Cherry remarked that he was "a good Canadian", but not the greatest Canadian, and that he was rooting for fellow Kingston resident, John A. Macdonald.

In 2005, Cherry was inducted into the Kingston & District Sports Hall of Fame.

In 2016, Cherry, along with Coach's Corner co-host Ron MacLean, received a star on Canada's Walk of Fame.

In 2018, Cherry received the Hockey Legacy Award from the Sports Museum at TD Garden.

In 2025, Cherry was awarded the King Charles III Coronation Medal for outstanding contributions to Canada, and was appointed to the Order of Ontario.

== See also ==
- List of NHL head coaches
- List of players who played only one game in the NHL

Preceded by Bep Guidolin	Head coach of the Boston Bruins; 1974–1979	Succeeded by Fred Creighton
Preceded by Bob Pulford	Winner of the Jack Adams Award; 1976	Succeeded by Scotty Bowman
Preceded by Aldo Guidolin	Head coach of the Colorado Rockies; 1979–1980	Succeeded by Bill MacMillan
