= Ron MacLean =

Canadian sportscaster (born 1960)

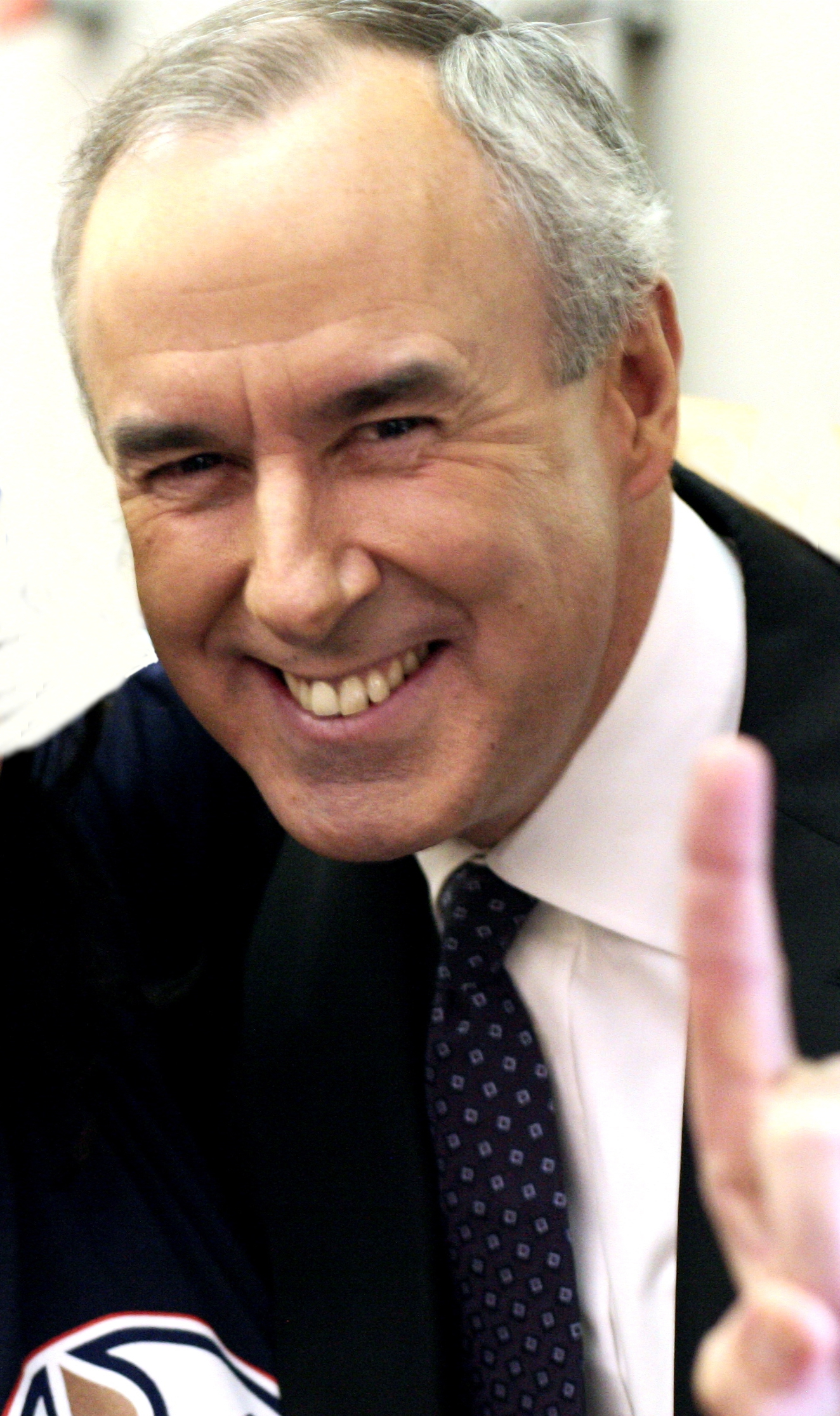
- MacLean in 2006
- Born: April 12, 1960 (age 66); Zweibrücken, West Germany
- Occupation: Sportscaster
- Employer(s): Canadian Broadcasting Corporation; Rogers Media
- Known for: Hockey Night in Canada; Coach's Corner

Ronald Joseph Corbett MacLean (born April 12, 1960) is a Canadian sportscaster for the CBC and Rogers Media. He co-hosted Coach's Corner with Don Cherry from 1986 to 2019, and the host since 2019. MacLean has also covered the Olympics for CBC Sports, and won eight Gemini Awards. He was inducted into the Alberta Sports Hall of Fame in 1996, and received a star on Canada's Walk of Fame in 2015.

== Early life and education ==
Ronald Joseph Corbett MacLean was born in Zweibrücken, West Germany, on April 12, 1960. His father, Ron MacLean Sr., worked for the Royal Canadian Air Force (RCAF) in West Germany on a NATO mission. Maclean's mother, Sarah MacDonald, worked at RCAF Station Namao near Edmonton. At fourteen months old, the family settled in Chester, Nova Scotia. MacLean was four years old when his dad was stationed in Whitehorse before relocating to Sylvan Lake, Alberta.

When MacLean attended high school in Red Deer, Alberta, he met his wife Cari. MacLean was to attend the University of Alberta until asked to fill in for a friend at CKRD-FM, which led to a job at CKRD-TV.

== Career ==
=== Hockey Night in Canada ===
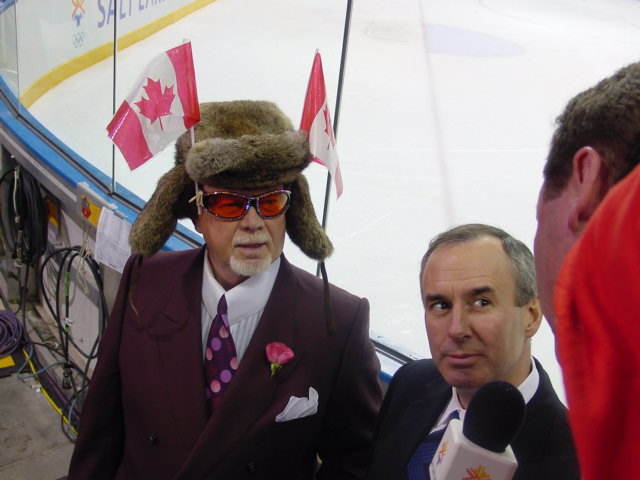
MacLean (right) with Don Cherry at the 2002 Winter Olympics

MacLean has worked on Hockey Night in Canada since the 1986–87 NHL season. He began hosting telecasts for the Calgary Flames and Toronto Maple Leafs when Dave Hodge moved to the Vancouver Canucks. Maclean worked his first Stanley Cup Final that spring, has since been the early game host, and co-hosted Coach's Corner with Don Cherry.

When contract negotiations with CBC Sports stalled in the 2001–02 NHL season, MacLean threatened to leave on the advice of his agent Don Meehan. Following a public outcry, the CBC gave in to his demands.

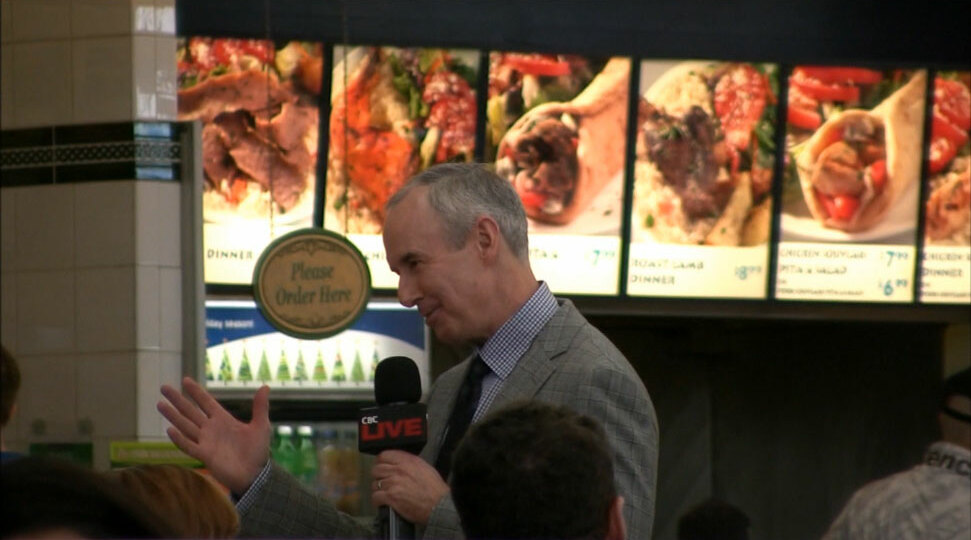
MacLean in 2013 at a CBC Live event

In addition to hosting HNIC, he has been a part of the CBC's Olympics coverage since 1988. He took over as chief anchor following the departure of Brian Williams to CTV/TSN. MacLean was the main sportscaster and host for the 2008 Summer Olympic Games in Beijing until his mother died, causing him to hand over duties to Scott Russell. In 1993, MacLean served as an ice level reporter for NBC Sports' coverage of the NHL All-Star Game in Montreal. MacLean has also hosted CBC's coverage of the Queen's Plate.

Beginning with the 2014–15 NHL season, MacLean was hired by Rogers Media when the company acquired the national rights to the NHL. MacLean was removed from the host position of Hockey Night in Canada, but retained his role as host of Coach's Corner, and became an on-location host for the new, travelling Hometown Hockey broadcasts introduced that season. In 2016, Rogers reinstated Maclean as host of the early games on Hockey Night beginning in the upcoming season, replacing George Stroumboulopoulos.

In November 2019, MacLean's co-host Don Cherry made remarks during Coach's Corner suggesting that Canadian immigrants benefit from the sacrifices of veterans and do not wear remembrance poppies. MacLean, who nodded during Cherry's rant and flashed a thumbs-up sign at the end of Saturday's segment, apologized the following day for staying silent during Cherry's remarks. Cherry was fired the following day, and expressed disappointment over MacLean's apology. MacLean addressed the incident during Hockey Night in Canada, the first without Cherry, and announced the end of Coach's Corner.

=== Ice hockey referee ===
MacLean has refereed with Hockey Canada, in junior, minor professional, senior, and university leagues, in the Southern Ontario region. He refereed an NHL preseason game between the Buffalo Sabres and Pittsburgh Penguins on September 29, 2006, calling one penalty in the final minute of play.

== Awards and honours ==
MacLean has won eight Gemini Awards for his work with CBC. His first was in 1992 for Best Sports Broadcaster; he also won the Best Sports Broadcaster award in 1994, 1997, 1998 and 2001. He won Best Host or Interviewer in a Sports Program or Sportscast in 2004 and again in 2006. In 1996, he was inducted into the Alberta Sports Hall of Fame. In 2015, he was inducted into the Oakville Sports Hall of Fame. In 2016, MacLean, along with his Coach's Corner co-host Don Cherry, received a star on Canada's Walk of Fame.

MacLean received an honorary degree from Lakehead University in 2018, and the University of Alberta in 2019.

== Personal life ==
MacLean was named Honorary Colonel of the 1 Air Movements Squadron at 17 Wing Winnipeg of the Canadian Forces' Air Command.

On June 3, 2010, MacLean helped to rescue a man trying to take his own life, by jumping into the Delaware River in Philadelphia.

In 2010, MacLean and his 1986 Ford Mustang were profiled by The Globe and Mail.
