= Oscar Olson (tug of war) =

American sportsperson

Oscar Olsen
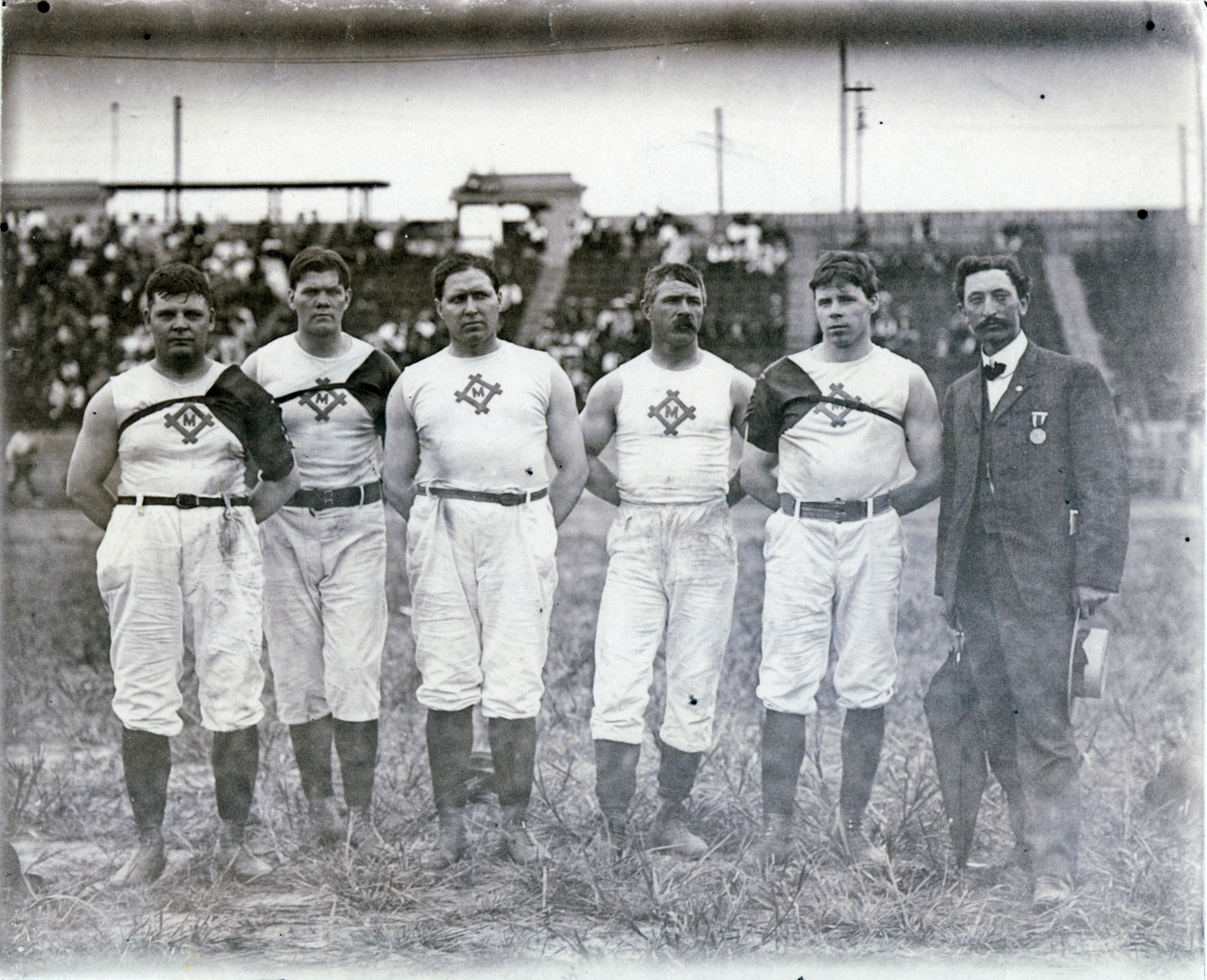
- The Milwaukee Athletic Club at the 1904 Summer Olympics (from left-to-right): Henry Seiling, Conrad Magnusson, Patrick Flanagan, Sidney Johnson, Oscar Olson

Personal information
- Full name: Oscar Gustave Olson
- Born: December 15, 1875 Oslo, Norway
- Died: December 5, 1962 (aged 86) Chicago, U.S.
Medal record
Men's tug of war
Representing the United States
Olympic Games
Gold medal – first place	1904 St. Louis	Team competition

Oscar Gustave Olson (December 15, 1875 – December 5, 1962), known also as Oscar Olsen, was a Norwegian-born American tug of war and weightlifter who competed at the 1904 Summer Olympics in St. Louis. He won a gold medal as a member of the Milwaukee Athletic Club tug of war team, which won the team competition at the 1904 Games. He also competed in the two-handed weightlifting event, finishing fourth.

Olsen was born in Oslo, Norway, and emigrated to the United States with his family as a youth in 1881. He settled in Chicago, where he worked as a machinist and became a longtime member of the Sleipner Athletic Club, also known as the Norwegian-American Athletic Association. The club was particularly successful in tug of war, which was considered an event in track & field in that era, and won several state and national championships during the 1900s. Olsen was a member of its tug of war team alongside fellow 1904 Olympian Conrad Magnusson.

For the 1904 Olympics, the Milwaukee Athletic Club club sponsored a tug of war team composed of five Chicago athletes, including Olsen, despite their affiliations with Chicago athletic clubs. The team competed in the six-team single-elimination tournament and defeated the New York Athletic Club to win the Olympic gold medal. The New York team subsequently withdrew from the tournament, leaving two St. Louis teams to receive the silver and bronze medals.

The Milwaukee team was unusual in that all five members were actually associated with the Athletic Association in Chicago, despite competing under the Milwaukee Athletic Club name. A contemporary photograph of the Olympic champions hangs at The Milwaukee Athletic Club today, with Olsen as one of the five members of the team.

Olsen was naturalized as a United States citizen in 1942 and remained in Chicago until his death in 1962, at the age of 86.

== See also ==
- Norway at the 1904 Summer Olympics
