= Weightlifting at the 1904 Summer Olympics – Men's all-around dumbbell =

Men's all-around dumbbell contest at the Games of the III Olympiad
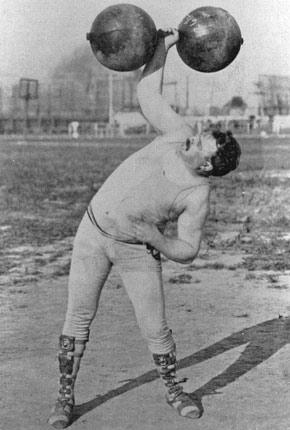
- Frederick Winters at 1904 Summer Olympics
- Venue: Francis Field
- Dates: 1 September; 3 September
- Competitors: 3 from 2 nations

Medalists
1st place, gold medalist(s)		Oscar Osthoff	United States
2nd place, silver medalist(s)		Frederick Winters	United States
3rd place, bronze medalist(s)		Frank Kugler	United States

The men's all-around dumbbell was a weightlifting event held as part of the weightlifting programme at the 1904 Summer Olympics in St. Louis, Missouri. Three athletes competed.

== Medalists ==
Gold	Silver	Bronze
Oscar Osthoff (USA)	Frederick Winters (USA)	Frank Kugler (USA)

== Results ==
Event 1
Place	Athlete	Lift	Score
1.	Frederick Winters (USA)	62.14	5
2.	Oscar Osthoff (USA)	45.14	3
3.	Frank Kugler (USA)	36.06	1

Event 2
Place	Athlete	Lift	Score
1.	Frederick Winters (USA)	45.47	5
2.	Oscar Osthoff (USA)	33.51	3
3.	Frank Kugler (USA)	24.15	1

After 2 events
Place	Athlete	1	2	Total
1.	Frederick Winters (USA)	5	5	10
2.	Oscar Osthoff (USA)	3	3	6
3.	Frank Kugler (USA)	1	1	2

Event 3
Place	Athlete	Lift	Score
1.	Frederick Winters (USA)	58.97	5
2.	Oscar Osthoff (USA)	52.96	3
3.	Frank Kugler (USA)	42.69	1

After 3 events
Place	Athlete	1	2	3	Total
1.	Frederick Winters (USA)	5	5	5	15
2.	Oscar Osthoff (USA)	3	3	3	9
3.	Frank Kugler (USA)	1	1	1	3

Event 4
Place	Athlete	Lift	Score
1.	Oscar Osthoff (USA)	68.04	5
2.	Frank Kugler (USA)	58.97	2
2.	Frederick Winters (USA)	58.97	2

After 4 events
Place	Athlete	1	2	3	4	Total
1.	Frederick Winters (USA)	5	5	5	2	17
2.	Oscar Osthoff (USA)	3	3	3	5	14
3.	Frank Kugler (USA)	1	1	1	2	5

Event 5
Place	Athlete	Lift	Score
1.	Frederick Winters (USA)	81.53	5
2.	Oscar Osthoff (USA)	67.42	3
3.	Frank Kugler (USA)	48.65	1

After 5 events
Place	Athlete	1	2	3	4	5	Total
1.	Frederick Winters (USA)	5	5	5	2	5	22
2.	Oscar Osthoff (USA)	3	3	3	5	3	17
3.	Frank Kugler (USA)	1	1	1	2	1	6

Event 6
Place	Athlete	Lift	Score
1.	Frederick Winters (USA)	61.46	5
2.	Oscar Osthoff (USA)	57.61	3
3.	Frank Kugler (USA)	46.66	1

After 6 events
Place	Athlete	1	2	3	4	5	6	Total
1.	Frederick Winters (USA)	5	5	5	2	5	5	27
2.	Oscar Osthoff (USA)	3	3	3	5	3	3	20
3.	Frank Kugler (USA)	1	1	1	2	1	1	7

Event 7
Place	Athlete	Lift	Score
1.	Oscar Osthoff (USA)	68.49	5
2.	Frederick Winters (USA)	63.73	3
3.	Frank Kugler (USA)	42.75	1

After 7 events
Place	Athlete	1	2	3	4	5	6	7	Total
1.	Frederick Winters (USA)	5	5	5	2	5	5	3	30
2.	Oscar Osthoff (USA)	3	3	3	5	3	3	5	25
3.	Frank Kugler (USA)	1	1	1	2	1	1	1	8

Event 8
Place	Athlete	Lift	Score
1.	Frederick Winters (USA)	57.38	5
2.	Oscar Osthoff (USA)	52.96	3
3.	Frank Kugler (USA)	35.38	1

After 8 events
Place	Athlete	1	2	3	4	5	6	7	8	Total
1.	Frederick Winters (USA)	5	5	5	2	5	5	3	5	35
2.	Oscar Osthoff (USA)	3	3	3	5	3	3	5	3	28
3.	Frank Kugler (USA)	1	1	1	2	1	1	1	1	9

Event 9
Place	Athlete	Lift	Score
1.	Oscar Osthoff (USA)	88.22	5
2.	Frederick Winters (USA)	76.71	3
3.	Frank Kugler (USA)	66.91	1

After 9 events
Place	Athlete	1	2	3	4	5	6	7	8	9	Total
1.	Frederick Winters (USA)	5	5	5	2	5	5	3	5	3	38
2.	Oscar Osthoff (USA)	3	3	3	5	3	3	5	3	5	33
3.	Frank Kugler (USA)	1	1	1	2	1	1	1	1	1	10

Event 10
Place	Athlete	Lift	Score
1.	Oscar Osthoff (USA)	6 x 80.29	15
2.	Frederick Winters (USA)	6 x 47.74	7
3.	Frank Kugler (USA)	No mark	0

Final standings
Place	Athlete	1	2	3	4	5	6	7	8	9	10	Total
Gold	Oscar Osthoff (USA)	3	3	3	5	3	3	5	3	5	15	48
Silver	Frederick Winters (USA)	5	5	5	2	5	5	3	5	3	7	45
Bronze	Frank Kugler (USA)	1	1	1	2	1	1	1	1	1	0	10

== Sources ==
- Wudarski, Pawel (1999). "Wyniki Igrzysk Olimpijskich" (in Polish).
