= Weightlifting at the 1904 Summer Olympics =

Weightlifting at the Games of the III Olympiad
- Weightlifting pictogram
- Venue: Francis Field
- Date: 1–3 September 1904
- No. of events: 2
- Competitors: 5 from 3 nations

At the 1904 Summer Olympics in St. Louis, two weightlifting events were contested.

== Medal summary ==
Event	Gold	Silver	Bronze
Two Hand Lift	Perikles Kakousis; Greece	Oscar Osthoff; United States	Frank Kugler; United States
All Around Dumbbell	Oscar Osthoff; United States	Frederick Winters; United States	Frank Kugler; United States

== Participating nations ==
5 weightlifters from 3 nations competed.

- Greece (1)
- Germany (1)
- United States (3)

== Medal table ==
Rank	Nation	Gold	Silver	Bronze	Total
1	United States	1	2	2	5
2	Greece	1	0	0	1
Totals (2 entries)		2	2	2	6
