= List of Olympic venues in weightlifting =

For the Summer Olympics, there are 25 venues that have been or will be used for weightlifting.

| Games | Venue | Other sports hosted at venue for those games | Capacity | Ref. |
|---|---|---|---|---|
| 1896 Athens | Panathinaiko Stadium | Athletics, Gymnastics, Wrestling | 80,000 | |
| 1904 St. Louis | Francis Field | Archery, Athletics, Cycling Football, Gymnastics, Lacrosse, Roque, Tennis, Tug of war, Wrestling | 19,000. | |
| 1920 Antwerp | Olympisch Stadion | Athletics, Equestrian, Field hockey, Football (final), Gymnastics, Modern pentathlon, Rugby union, Tug of war | 12,771 | |
| 1924 Paris | Vélodrome d'hiver | Boxing, Cycling (track), Fencing, Wrestling | 10,884 | |
| 1928 Amsterdam | Krachtsportgebouw | Boxing, Wrestling | 2,840 | |
| 1932 Los Angeles | Olympic Auditorium | Boxing, Wrestling | 10,000. | |
| 1936 Berlin | Deutschlandhalle | Boxing, Wrestling | 8,630 | |
| 1948 London | Empress Hall, Earl's Court | Boxing, Gymnastics, Wrestling | 19,000 | |
| 1952 Helsinki | Messuhalli | Basketball (final), Boxing, Gymnastics, Wrestling | 5,500 | |
| 1956 Melbourne | Royal Exhibition Building | Basketball (final), Modern pentathlon (fencing), Wrestling | 3,500 | |
| 1960 Rome | Palazzetto dello sport | Basketball | Not listed. | |
| 1964 Tokyo | Shibuya Public Hall | None | 2,200 | |
| 1968 Mexico City | Insurgentes Theatre | None | 1,100 | |
| 1972 Munich | Messegelände, Gewichtheberhalle | None | 3,297 | |
| 1976 Montreal | St. Michel Arena | None | 2,000 | |
| 1980 Moscow | Izmailovo Sports Palace | None | 5,000 | |
| 1984 Los Angeles | Albert Gersten Pavilion | None | 4,156 | |
| 1988 Seoul | Olympic Weightlifting Gymnasium | None | 4,000 | |
| 1992 Barcelona | Pavelló de l'Espanya Industrial | None | Not listed. | |
| 1996 Atlanta | Georgia World Congress Center | Fencing, Handball, Judo, Modern pentathlon (fencing, shooting), Table tennis, Wrestling | 3,900 (fencing); 7,300 (handball); 7,300 (judo); 4,700 (table tennis); 5,000 (weightlifting); 7,300 (wrestling) | |
| 2000 Sydney | Sydney Convention and Exhibition Centre | Boxing, Fencing, Judo, Wrestling | 7,500 (weightlifting), 9,000 (judo & wrestling), 10,000 (boxing & fencing) | |
| 2004 Athens | Nikaia Olympic Weightlifting Hall | None | Not listed. | |
| 2008 Beijing | Beihang University Gymnasium | None | 5,400 | |
| 2012 London | ExCeL | Boxing, Fencing, Judo, Table tennis, Taekwondo, Wrestling | Not listed. | |
| 2016 Rio de Janeiro | Riocentro – Pavilion 2 | None | 6,000 | |
| 2020 Tokyo | Tokyo International Forum | None | 5,000 | |
| 2024 Paris | Paris Expo Porte de Versailles | Handball, Table tennis, Volleyball | 6,000 | |
| 2028 Los Angeles | Peacock Theater | None | 7,100 | |
| 2032 Brisbane | Gold Coast Convention & Exhibition Centre | Volleyball (preliminaries) | 5,000 | |

== Gallery of venues ==
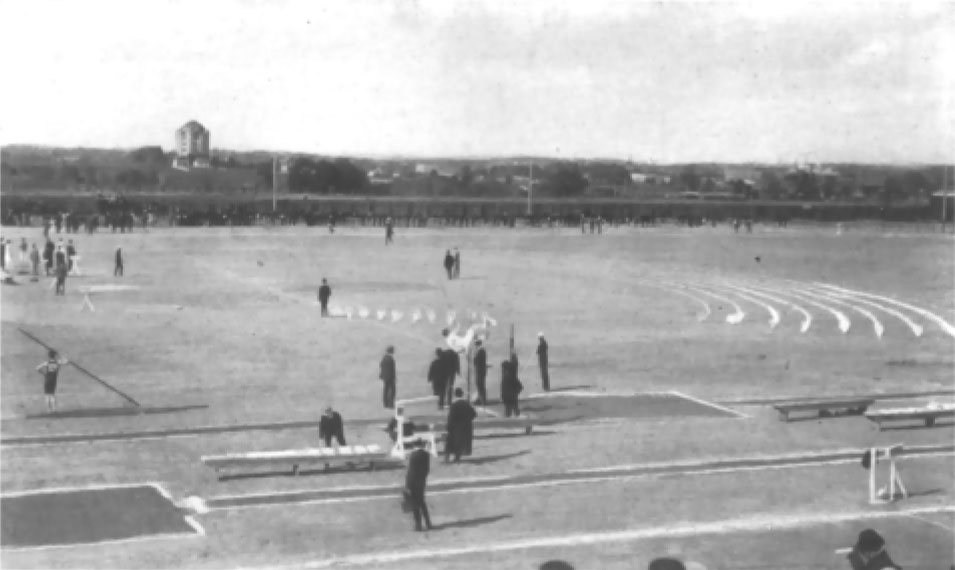
Francis Field hosted weightlifting at the 1904 Summer Olympics in St. Louis.

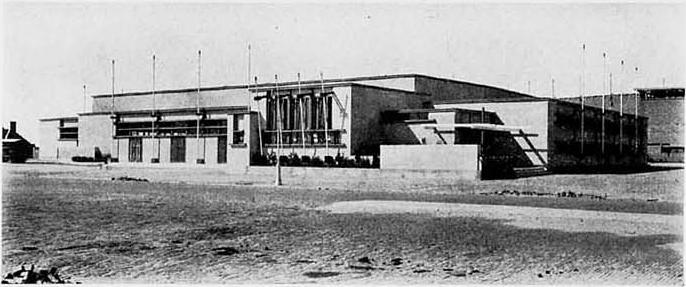
Strength Sports Hall hosted weightlifting at the 1928 Summer Olympics in Amsterdam.

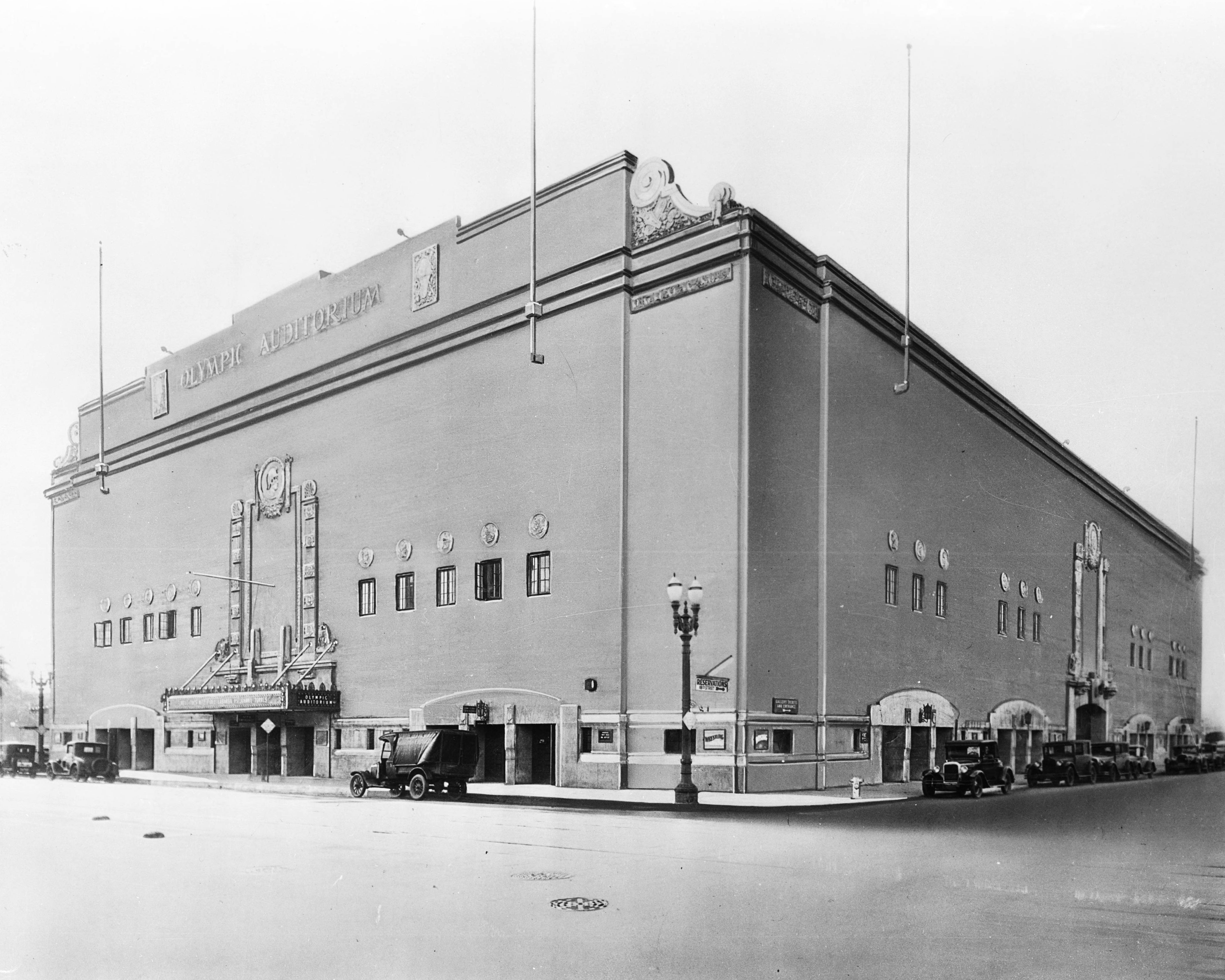
Grand Olympic Auditorium hosted weightlifting at the 1932 Summer Olympics in Los Angeles.

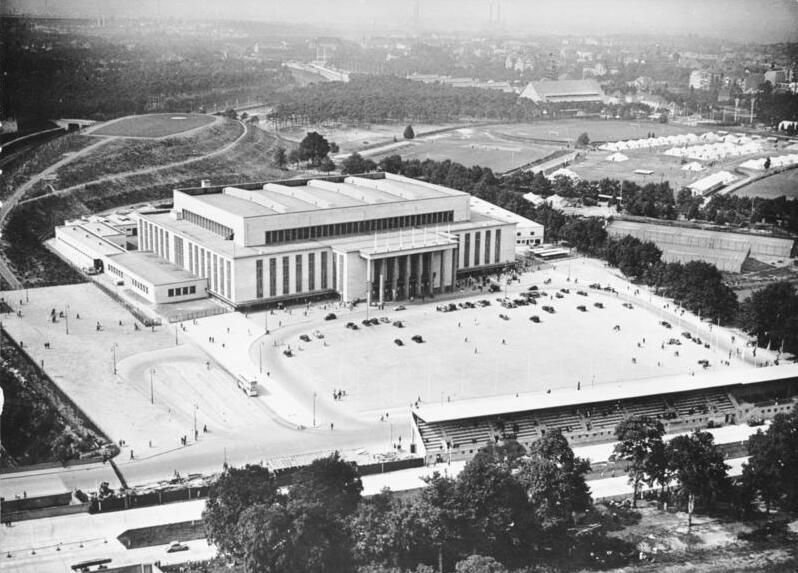
The Deutschlandhalle hosted weightlifting at the 1936 Summer Olympics in Berlin.

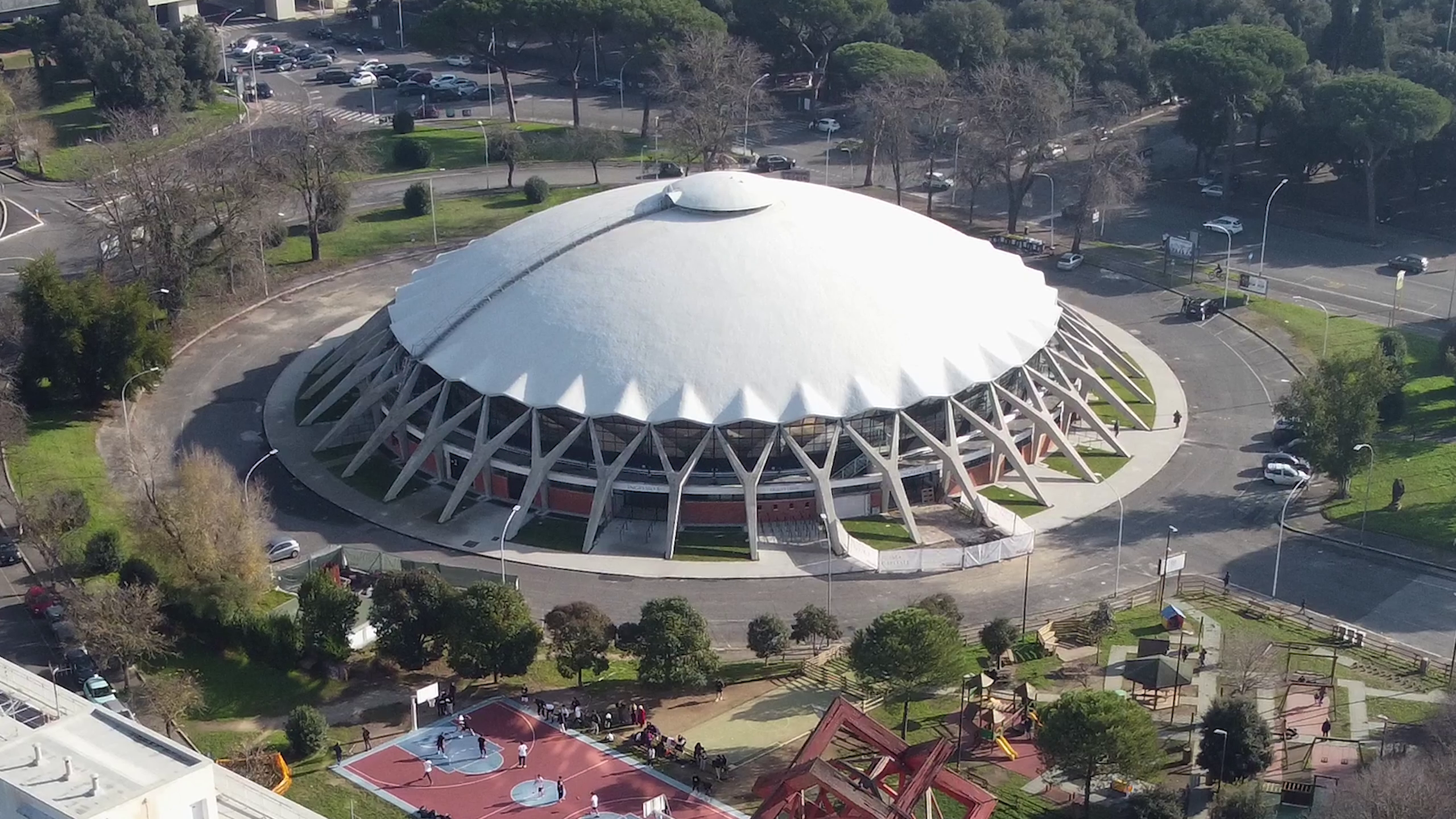
Palazzetto dello Sport hosted weightlifting at the 1960 Summer Olympics in Rome.

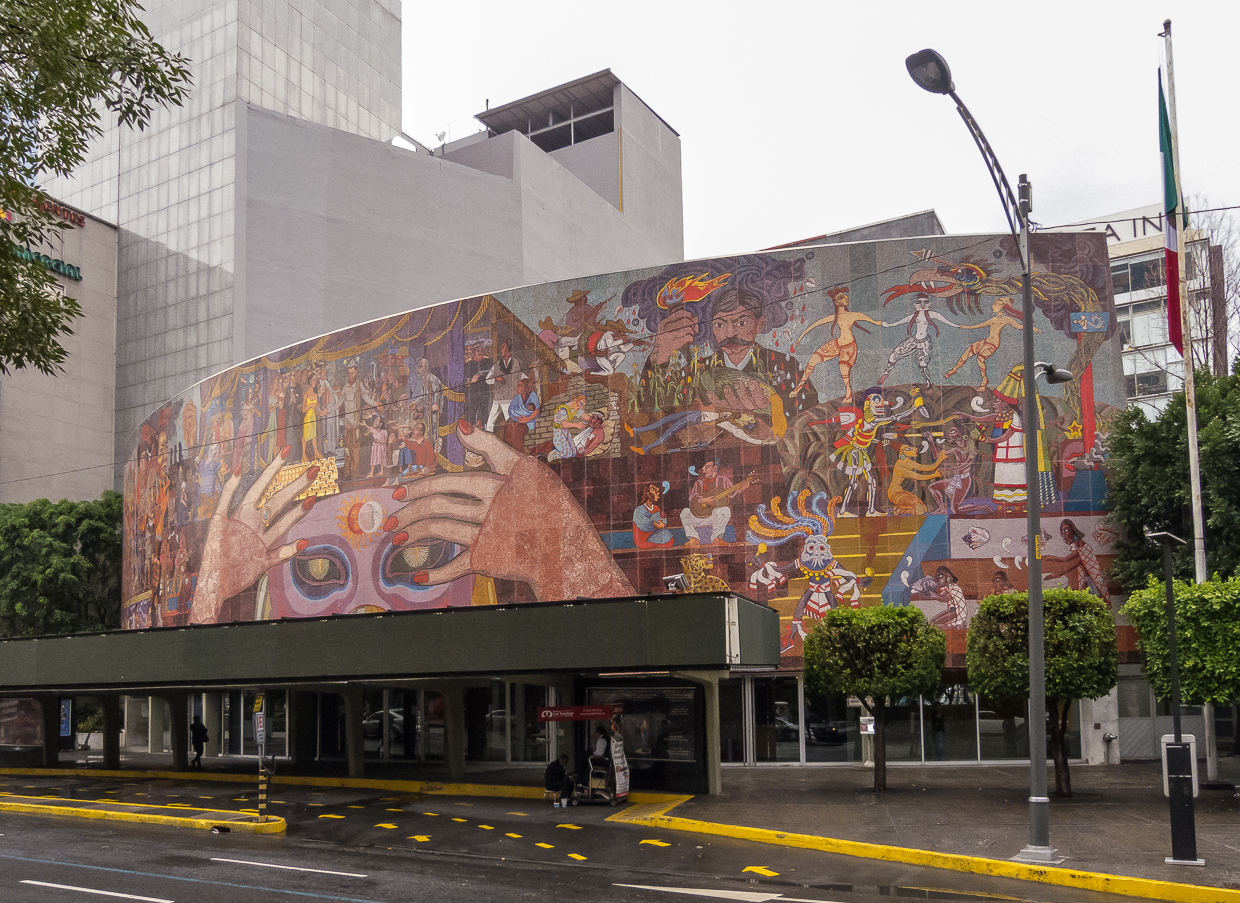
Teatro de los Insurgentes hosted weightlifting at the 1968 Summer Olympics in Mexico City.

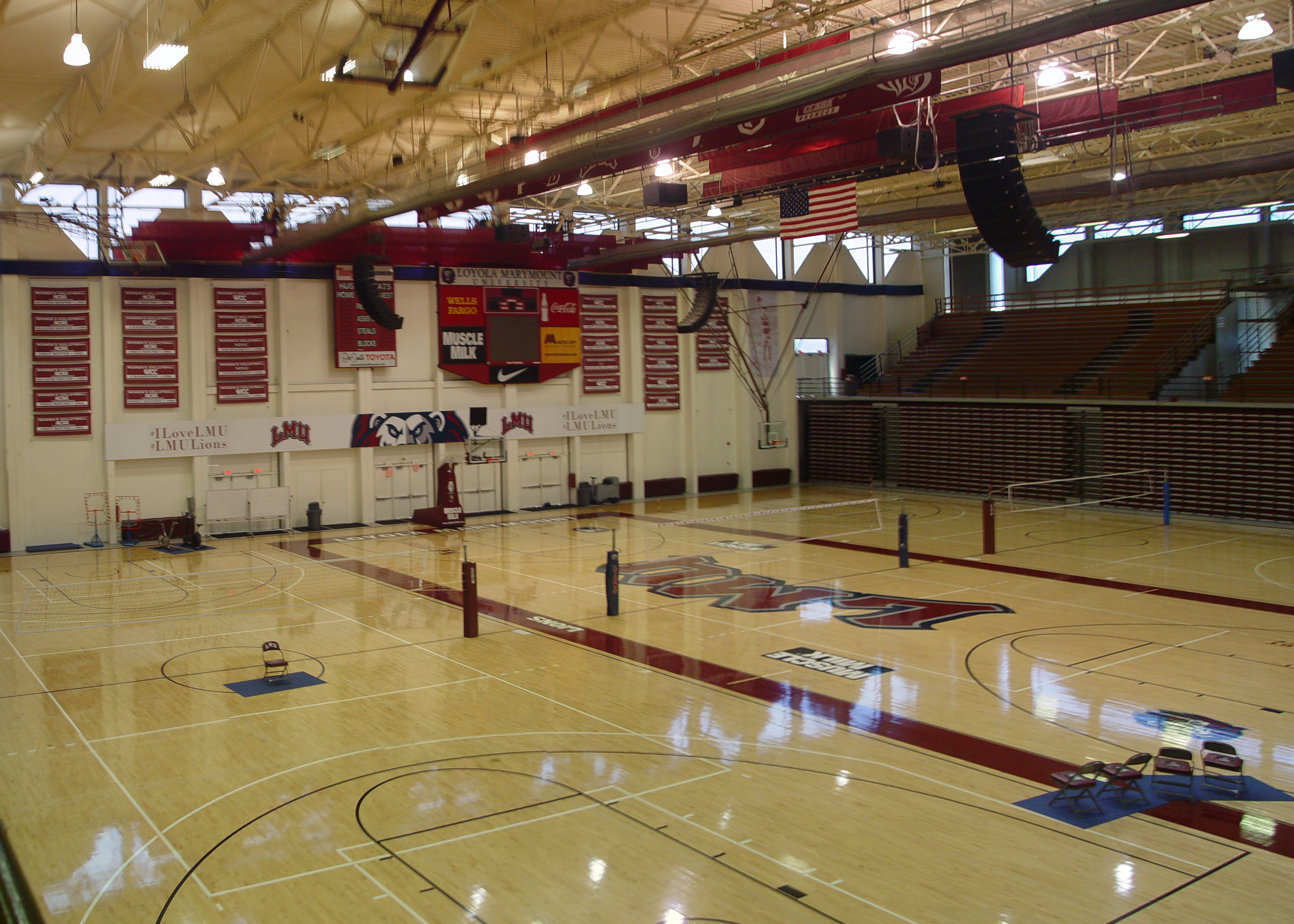
Gersten Pavilion hosted weightlifting at the 1984 Summer Olympics in Los Angeles.

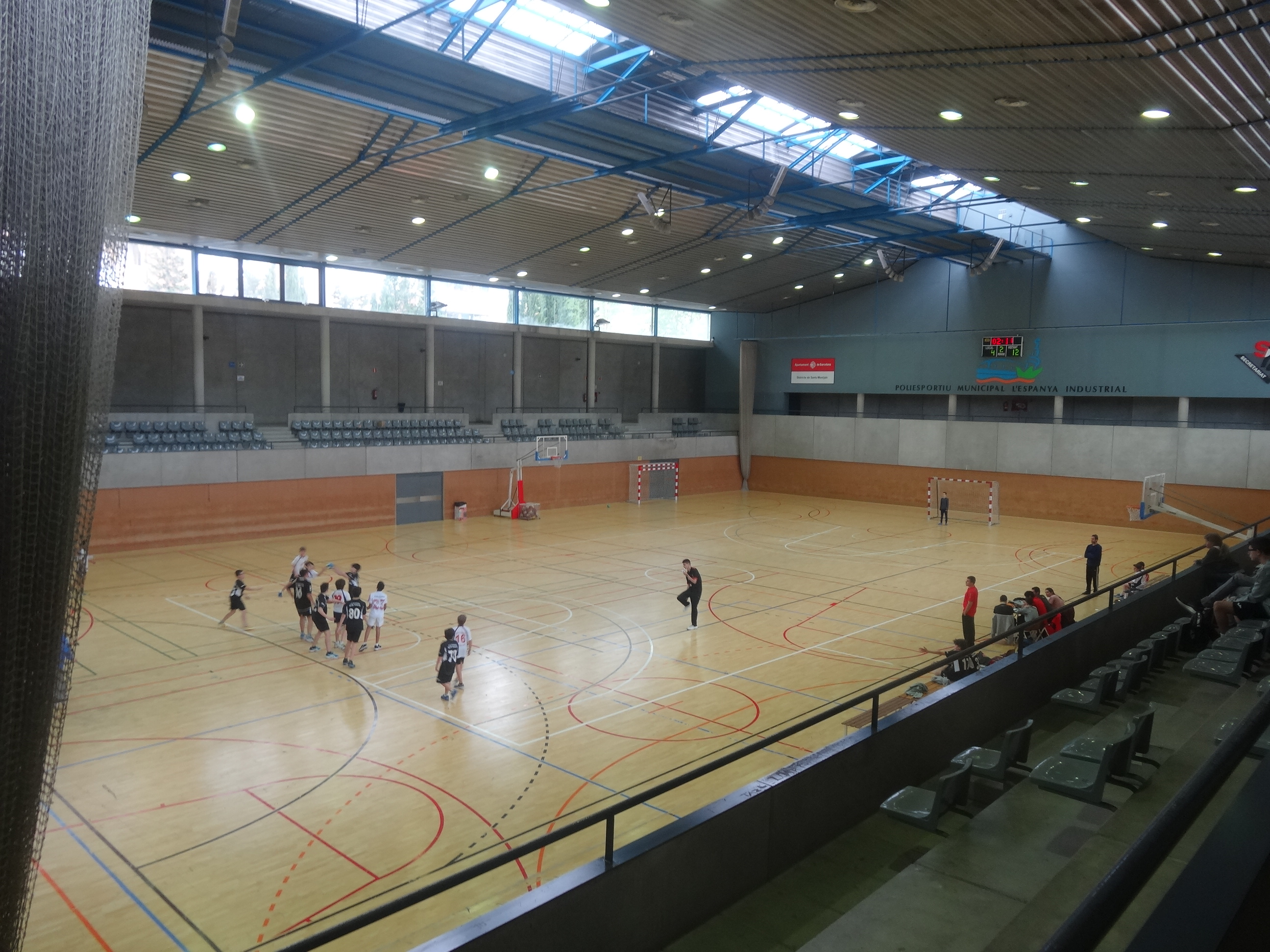
Pavelló de l'Espanya Industrial hosted weightlifting at the 1992 Summer Olympics in Barcelona.

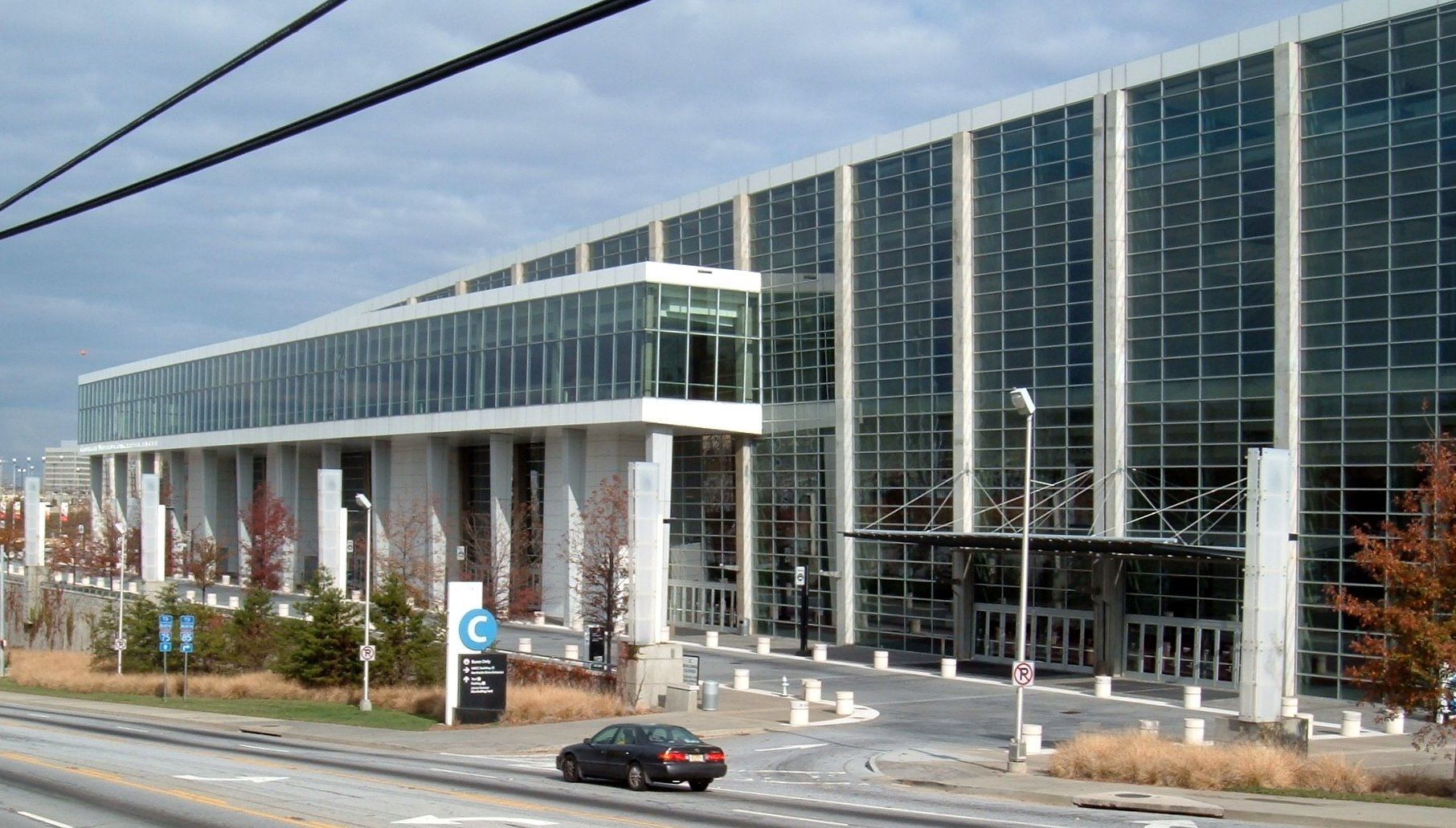
Georgia World Congress Center hosted weightlifting at the 1996 Summer Olympics in Atlanta.

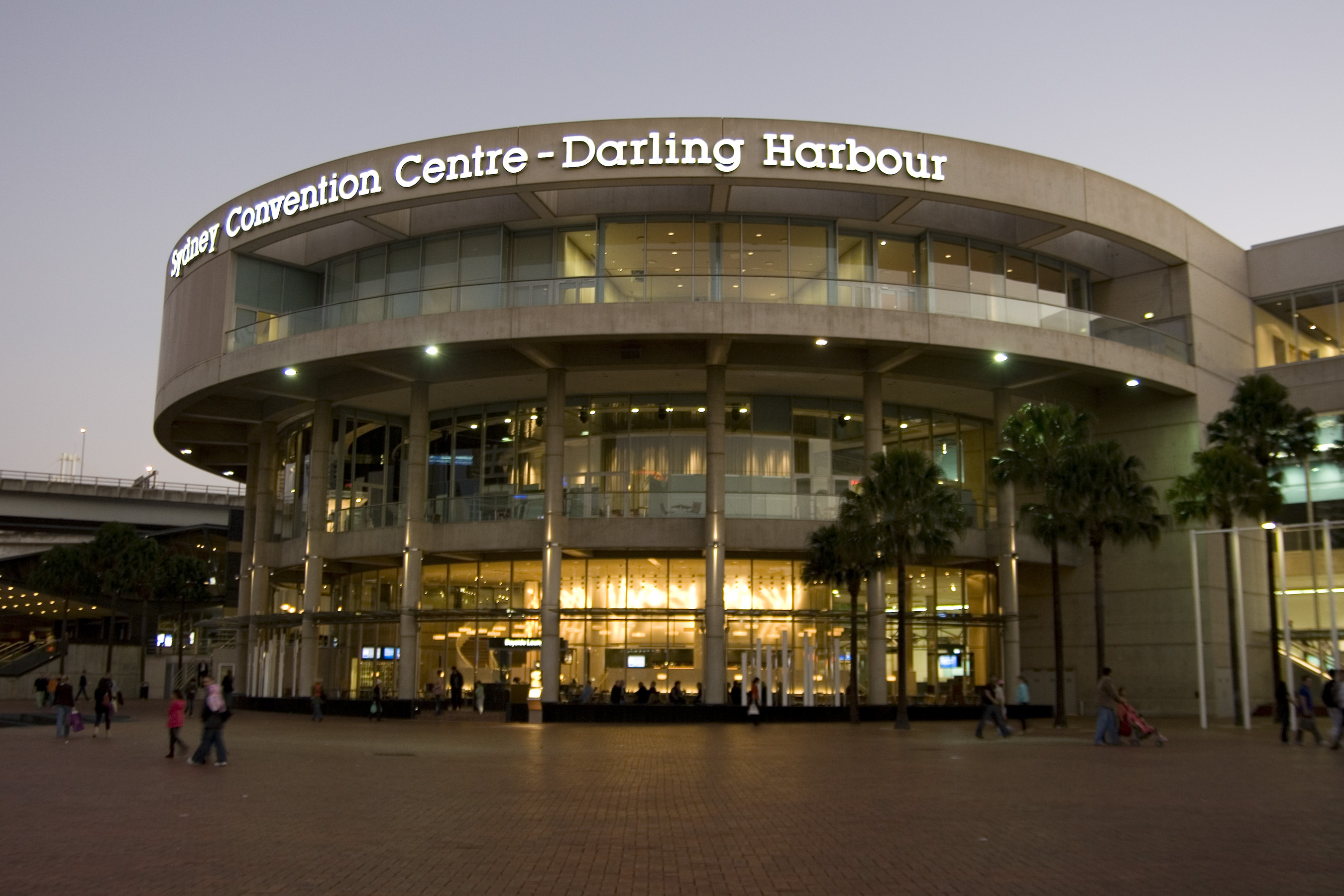
The Sydney Convention and Exhibition Centre hosted weightlifting at the 2000 Summer Olympics.

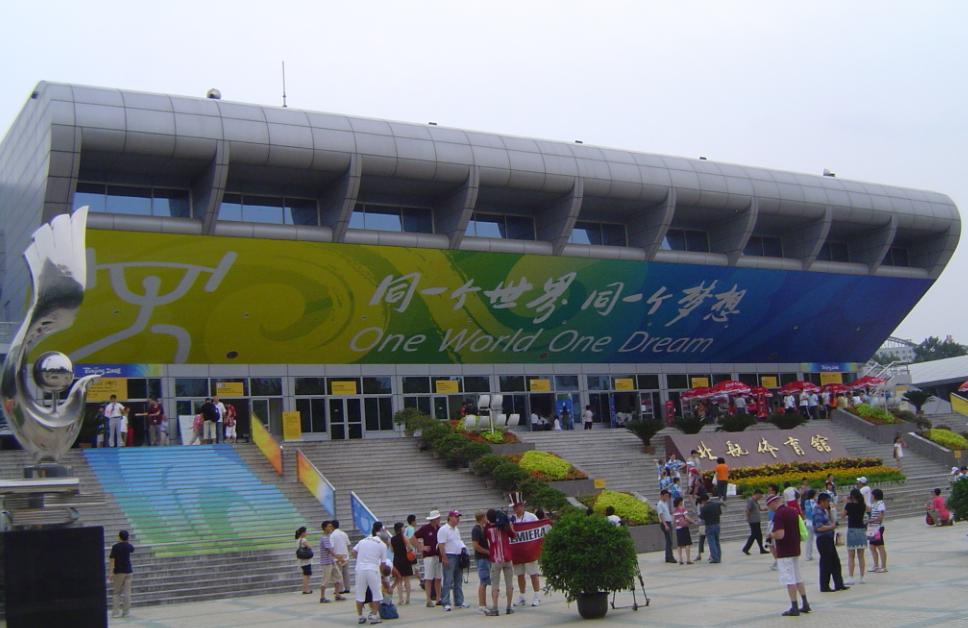
Beihang University Gymnasium hosted weightlifting at the 2008 Summer Olympics in Beijing.

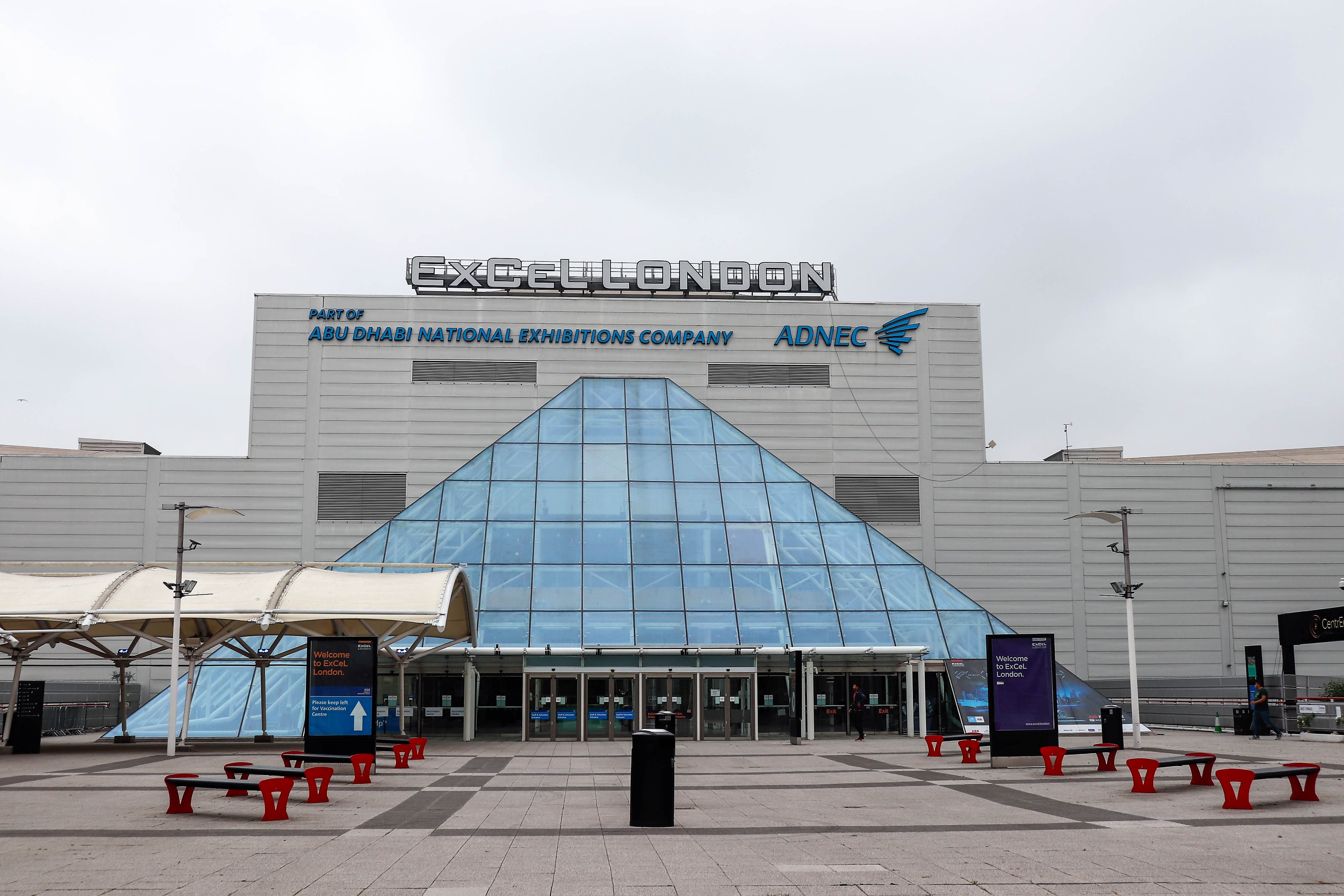
Excel London hosted weightlifting at the 2012 Summer Olympics.

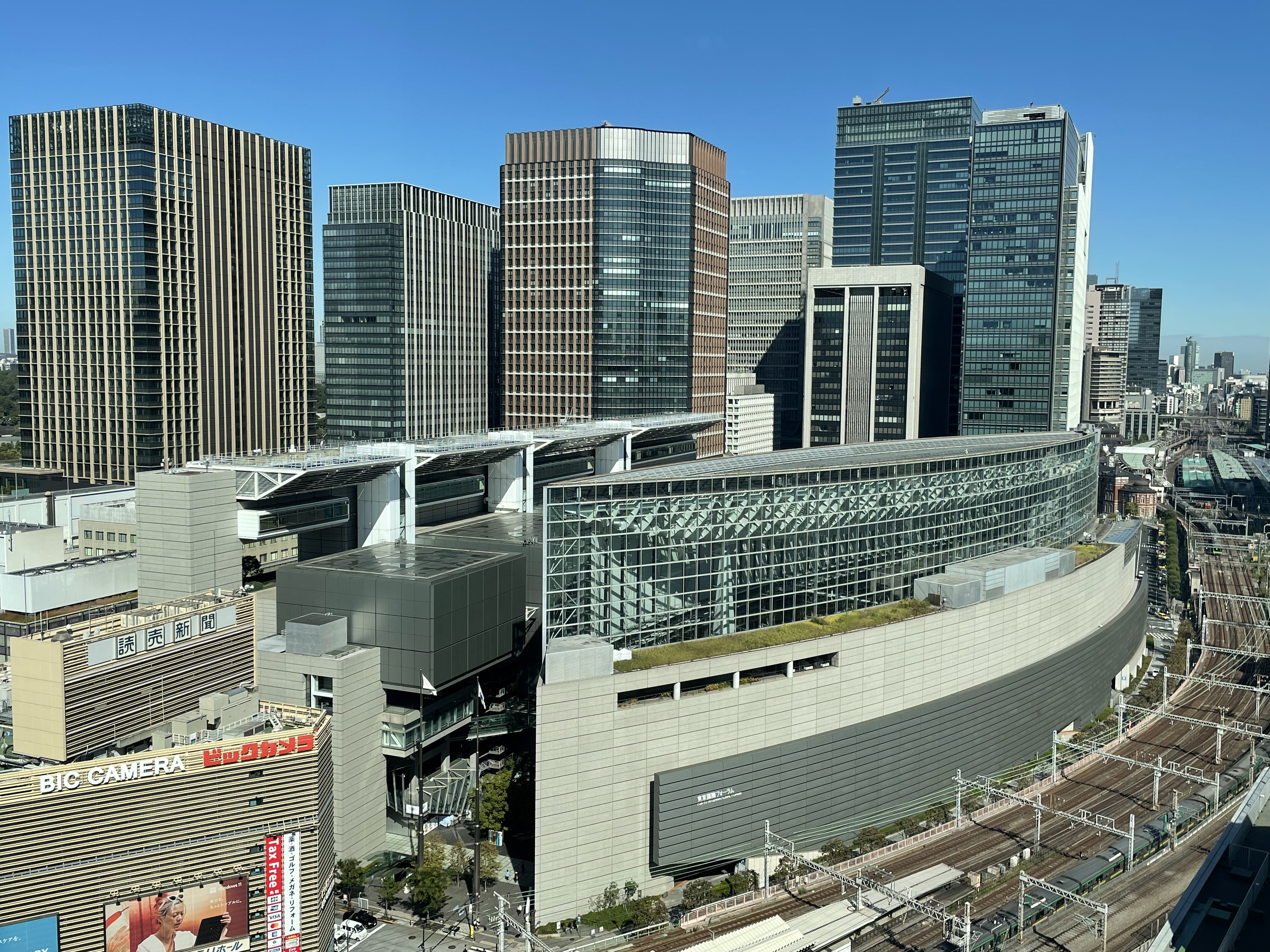
Tokyo International Forum hosted weightlifting at the 2020 Summer Olympics.

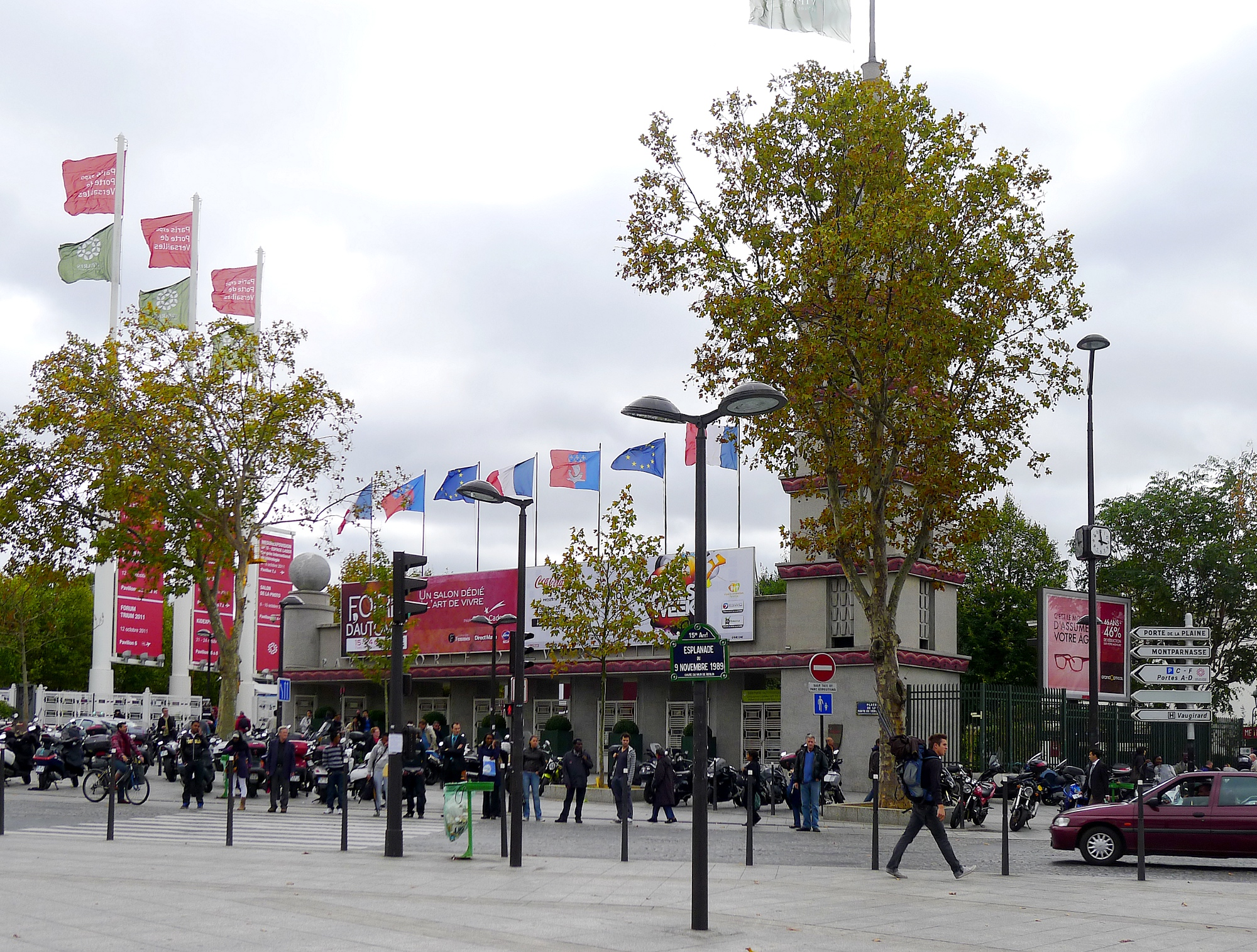
Paris Expo Porte de Versailles hosted weightlifting at the 2024 Summer Olympics.

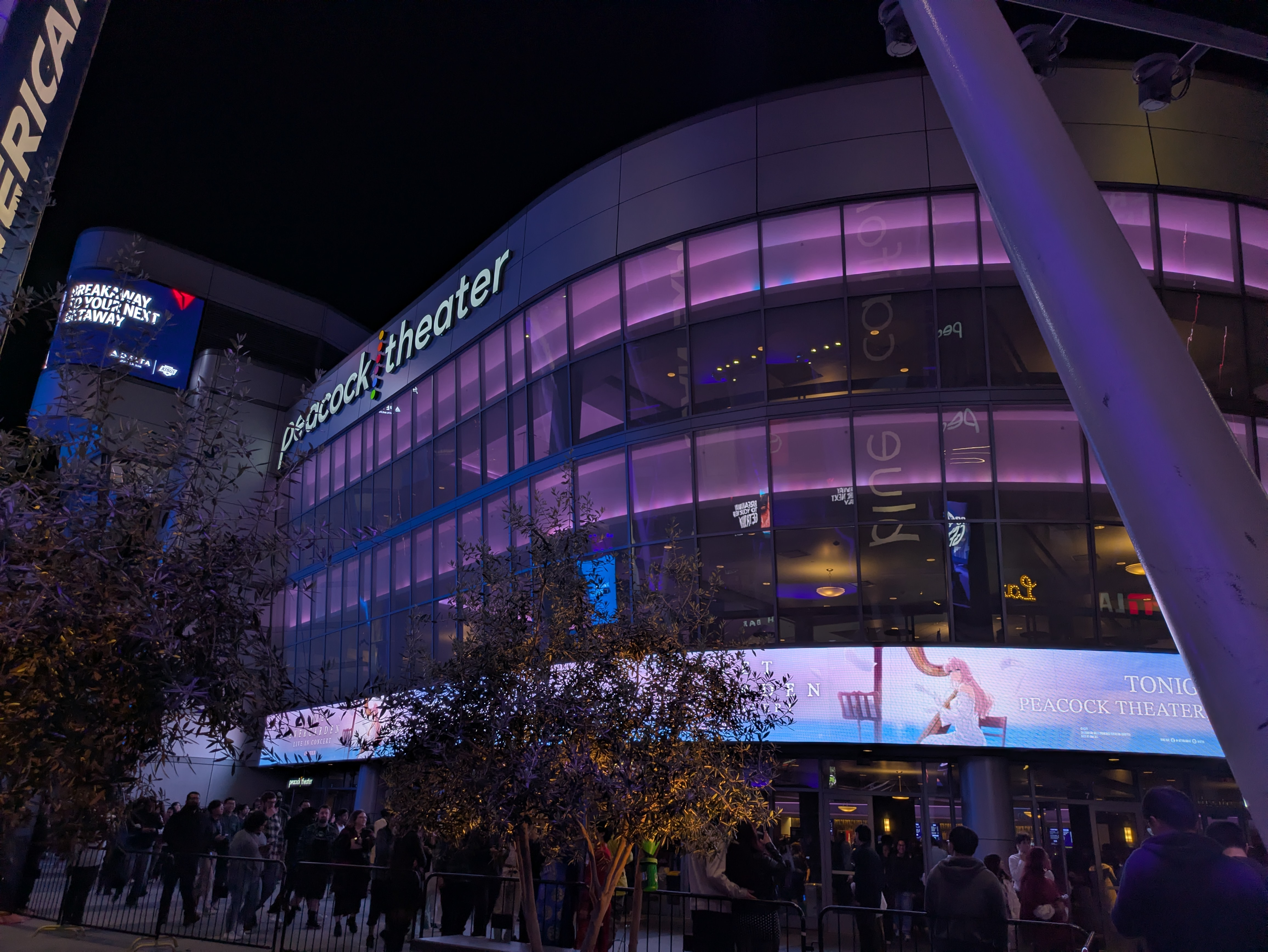
Peacock Theater will host weightlifting at the 2028 Summer Olympics in Los Angeles.
