= August Rodenberg =

American tug of war competitor

Olympic medal record

Men's Tug of war

Representing the United States
Silver medal – second place	1904 St. Louis	Team competition

August Henry Rodenberg (July 25, 1873 – April 12, 1933) was an American tug of war athlete who competed in the 1904 Summer Olympics. He was born and died in St. Louis, Missouri. In the 1904 Olympics he won a silver medal as a member of Southwest Turnverein of Saint Louis No. 1 team.
