= Jesse Henry Leavenworth =

American Union Army colonel (1807–1885)

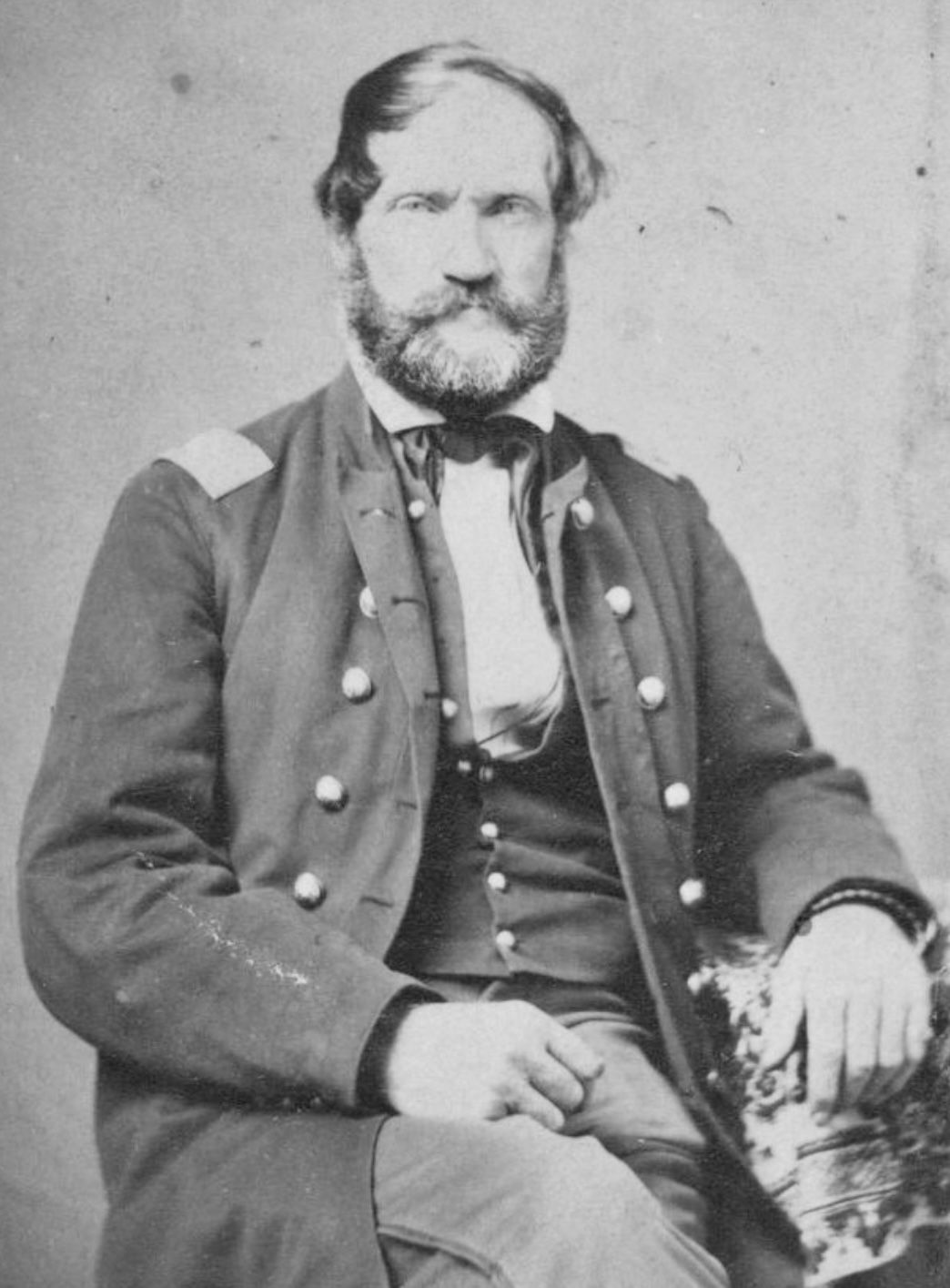
- Jesse Henry Leavenworth
- Born: March 29, 1807; Danville, Vermont, U.S.
- Died: March 12, 1885 (aged 77); Milwaukee, Wisconsin, U.S.
- Burial place: Forest Home Cemetery in Milwaukee, Wisconsin
- Military career
- Allegiance: United States of America; Union
- Branch: United States Army; Union Army
- Service years: 1830-1836, 1862-1863
- Rank: Colonel
- Conflicts: Black Hawk War; American Civil War

Jesse Henry Leavenworth (March 29, 1807–March 12, 1885) was a United States military officer and engineer who served in the Black Hawk War and American Civil War.

== Biography ==
=== Early life ===
Leavenworth was the son of Brigadier General Henry Leavenworth and his wife Elizabeth Eunice Morrison. He was born March 29, 1807, in Danville, Vermont. He graduated in the West Point class of 1830, ranking 22nd out of 42 cadets.

=== Early career ===
Upon graduation he was commissioned as a second lieutenant in the 4th Infantry, known as the "Rocky Mountain Rangers", based near Denver, Colorado, which protected the frontier against bandits and Indian marauders.

Leavenworth married Elvira Caroline Clark, daughter of Festus Clark, of Sackett's Harbor, New York, June 12, 1832, and they had four sons and four daughters between 1833 and 1853. He resigned from the Army in 1836 to spend more time with his family.

Leavenworth was a civil engineer active in the west, with a private practice based in Chicago, Illinois, for 22 years. He also worked as a lumber merchant in Wisconsin.

=== Civil War ===
On February 17, 1862, after the outbreak of the American Civil War, he was commissioned as a colonel in the volunteers and was given command of the 2nd Colorado Infantry Regiment. He was once again assigned to the "Rocky Mountain Rangers" in which he now had the added responsibility of guarding against action by Confederate sympathizers. He was honorably discharged on September 26, 1863.

In the Spring of 1862, the government sent multiple companies out West to escort wagon-trains and mail-coaches. That May, Colonel Jesse H. Leavenworth traveled west with the Ohio Cavalry to commanded the Ninth Wisconsin artillery, with six brass twelve-pounders.

=== Later life ===
In 1864 the Army made Leavenworth the Indian agent to the Southern Cheyenne, Kiowa and Comanche, representing the United States government in its attempts to keep peace with the tribes. He was responsible for a number of captive releases of hostages taken by the tribes.

After retiring from government service around 1870, he returned to Wisconsin and resumed his activities as an engineer and merchant; he died in Milwaukee, Wisconsin in 1885. His daughter, Mary, was the wife of Charles James Kershaw, a grain broker trading on the Chicago Board of Trade.
