= Frank Kugler =

German-American sportsman

Personal information
- Full name: Franz Xaver Kugler
- Born: August 14, 1882 Cham, German Empire
- Died: July 7, 1952 (aged 73) St. Louis, Missouri, U.S.
Medal record
Representing the United States St. Louis Southwest Turnverein
Olympic Games
Men's freestyle wrestling
Silver medal – second place	1904 St Louis	Heavyweight
Men's weightlifting
Bronze medal – third place	1904 St Louis	Two hand lift
Bronze medal – third place	1904 St Louis	All-around dumbbell
Men's tug of war
Bronze medal – third place	1904 St Louis	Team competition

Frank X. Kugler (March 29, 1879 – July 7, 1952) was a German-American wrestler, weightlifter and tug of war competitor who competed at the 1904 Summer Olympics and won medals in all three distinct sports at the same Games.

== Biography ==
Franz Kugler was a member of the St. Louis Southwest Turnverein team, having immigrated from Germany to the United States, and was granted U.S. citizenship in 1913. Kugler worked as a brewer in St. Louis. Although born in Germany, he became a US citizen in 1913, and he did not speak English at the time of the 1904 Olympics.

Kugler holds the record of being the only athlete in history to medal in three different sports at a single Olympic Games. At the 1904 Summer Olympics, he won a silver medal in the heavyweight wrestling event, bronze medals in the two-hand lift and all-around dumbbell weightlifting events, and a further bronze medal in the tug of war competition as a member of the Southwest Turnverein of Saint Louis No. 2 team.

Despite taking last place in nine of the 10 events in the dumbbell competition, he won the bronze medal as there were only three competitors.

=== Disputed country attribution ===
The International Olympic Committee (IOC) listed German-American Franz Kugler as a member of the U.S. delegation until 2022, when it assigned the medals he had won at the 1904 St. Louis Olympics to the United States. Between 2021 and 2024, the IOC briefly adjusted its policy to attribute individual medals according to an athlete's nationality, retroactively assigning Frank Kugler's medals to Germany.

Since 2024, the IOC has considered the national affiliation of the club or team for which an athlete competed to be the decisive factor for the first three Olympic Games (1896, 1900, and 1904) rather than individual nationality, attributing participation and medals accordingly. As a representative of an American club, his participation and all his medals were attributed to the |United States.

== See also ==
- Dual sport and multi-sport Olympians
