= Weightlifting at the 1904 Summer Olympics – Men's two hand lift =

Men's two handed weightlifting at the Games of the III Olympiad
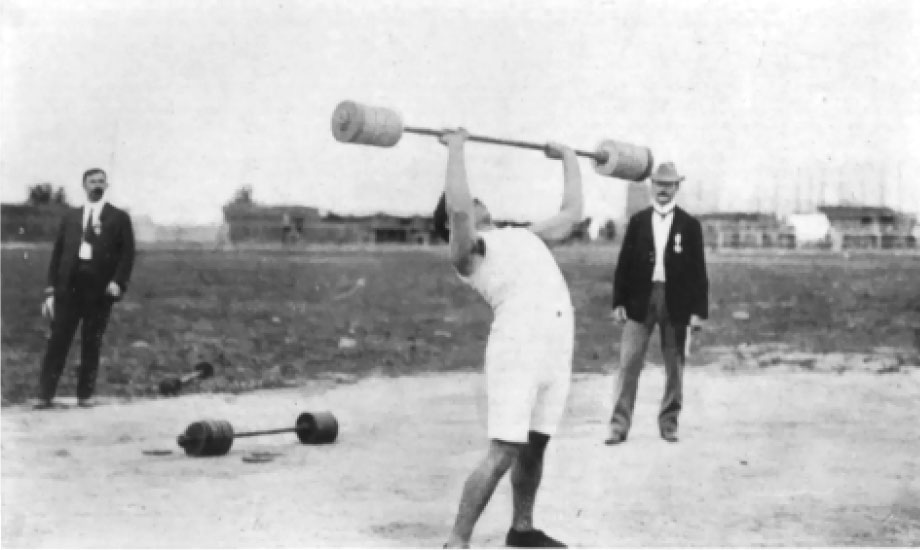
- Perikles Kakousis wins the two hand lift competition.
- Venue: Francis Field
- Date: 3 September
- Competitors: 4 from 2 nations
- Winning weight: 111.70

Medalists
1st place, gold medalist(s)		Perikles Kakousis; Greece
2nd place, silver medalist(s)		Oscar Osthoff; United States
3rd place, bronze medalist(s)		Frank Kugler; United States

The men's two hand lift was a weightlifting event held as part of the weightlifting programme at the 1904 Summer Olympics in St. Louis, Missouri. It was the second time the event was held. Four athletes from two nations competed.

== Background ==
This was the second of two appearances of this two hand lift event. It was previously held in 1896.

== Competition format ==
In this weightlifting event, two hands were used in lifting the weights. Any style could be used.

== Schedule ==
Date	Time	Round
Saturday, 3 September		Final

== Results ==
Rank	Lifter	Nation	Weight (kg)	Notes
1st place, gold medalist(s)	Perikles Kakousis	Greece	111.70	OR
2nd place, silver medalist(s)	Oscar Osthoff	United States	84.37	
3rd place, bronze medalist(s)	Frank Kugler	United States	79.61	
4	Oscar Olsen	United States	67.81	

== Sources ==
- Wudarski, Pawel (1999). "Wyniki Igrzysk Olimpijskich" (in Polish).
