= Charles Manegold Jr. =

Charles Manegold Jr. was a founding father of the Milwaukee Parks Department. Manegold was president of the Milwaukee-Waukesha Brewing Company, with plant at No. 155 South Water Street in Milwaukee, was born September 15, 1851, in the city which is still his home. His father, Charles Manegold, was a native of Braunschweig, Germany, and came to the United States in 1848. For a time he resided in Cincinnati, Ohio, and then removed to Milwaukee. He was a blacksmith by trade but in later life turned his attention to the ice business in this city and in 1868 built a flour mill on South Water street, which he continued to own and operate until his death in May 1879, his son Charles Jr., being associated with him in this undertaking. He was an active and progressive businessman and he enjoyed the respect and confidence of all. His father was Henry Manegold, who was likewise a blacksmith by trade. The mother of Charles Manegold Jr. bore the maiden name of Wilhelmina Notbohm, and she too was born in Braunschweig, Germany, while her death occurred in Milwaukee in 1909. Our subject has two brothers, Henry and William, who are yet regents of Milwaukee, the former now living retired. Two other brothers, Fred and Albert Manegold are deceased.

== Education and early career ==
Manegold obtained a public school education in his native city, after which he learned the miller's trade in his father's mill, serving an apprenticeship to Eugene Hotchkiss, who had rented the mill. He thoroughly mastered the business in principle and detail and in 1871 was admitted to a partnership under the firm style of Hotchkiss & Manegold. Later in the same year, however, the firm went out of business. Manegold afterward operated the mill for his father and an uncle, August Manegold, for a period of three years. At the end of that time August Manegold died and Charles Manegold Jr. became an equal partner with his father in the business. He remained an active factor in the conduct of the enterprise until 1910.

== Mid-career ==
In 1876, he had become a partner of Charles James Kershaw in the ownership of the Northwestern Marine elevator, and in 1878 he and his father purchased the Reliance Flour Mill at West Water street. He took an active part in the successful management and control of all three of these business enterprises and was actively associated with the milling business until 1910. In the meantime, he had become interested in the Milwaukee Malting Company in 1886 and was identified therewith until 1898, when the company sold out to the American Malting Company.

== Milwaukee Waukesha Brewing ==
In 1899, Manegold became the owner of the business carried on under the name of the Milwaukee-Waukesha Brewing Company, of which he was the president. It has breweries in downtown Waukesha, Wisconsin, and nearby at Fox Head Springs, a business has been developed to substantial proportions and in its conduct Manegold displayed the same spirit of enterprise, determination and progressiveness which characterized him in his other industrial and commercial connections.

== Family life ==
On 16 October 1875, Manegold was married to Miss Anna Kretschmar, a daughter of Robert Kretschmar, a native of Saxony, Germany, who conducted business as a butcher and meatpacker. The Manegolds had three daughters: Emily, who married A. S. Lindeman, of Milwaukee; Ella, the wife of Frank Boesel, a lawyer of the city; and Irma, who married Dr. Edwin Henes. of New York. Emily had two daughters, Alice and Charlotte, while Ella had three children, Charles, Frank and Marianna, and Irma had two children, Virginia and Edwin.

== Community service ==
Manegold took a deep and helpful interest in public affairs. He was one of the first Milwaukee Park commissioners of the city, filling the office in 1889 when the park system was inaugurated. He gave much time to the project for a period of ten years and as a member of the first park board, he made the original purchase of what is now Lake Park, Washington Park, Kosciuszko Park and other parks of the city. His co-operation could at all times be counted upon to further any plans or measures for the general good. Politically, he maintained an independent course and never held or desired elective office.

== Social organizations ==
He was identified with many social organizations and societies which had to do directly with the benefit and upbuilding of Milwaukee. He had membership in the Association of Commerce, the Milwaukee Athletic Club, the Wisconsin Club, the Calumet Club, the Blue Mound Country Club and also in the Milwaukee Art Institute. He greatly enjoyed bowling and fishing and turned to these for recreation when leisure permits.

== Travel ==
He also benefited greatly by travel abroad and visited Spitsbergen, Egypt, the Holy Land, South America and other points of wide interest. He went to Alaska in 1898, the year gold was discovered there, but he did not learn of the discovery until he had returned to Seattle. He also visited the West Indies, saw the Panama Canal in the making and traveled throughout Mexico. He was always accompanied by his wife or other members of the family and he found his greatest happiness in promoting the welfare and happiness of the members of his own household. As a member of the Milwaukee Chamber of Commerce he served for twenty years as one of the committee on arbitration. He closely studied the questions which were vital to the welfare and progress of the city and state in which he made his home, and his support of any measure was an indication of his firm belief in its value as related to good government.

== Sources ==
- History of Milwaukee by Bruce & Curry: Charles Manegold Jr.
- "New Bank for Milwaukee organized", Chicago Tribune, 1892
