= Oscar Osthoff =

American athlete and coach (1883–1950)

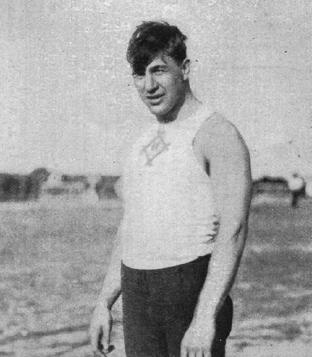
- Osthoff in 1904

Biographical details
- Born: March 23, 1883
- Died: December 9, 1950 (aged 67)

Playing career

Football
- 1907–1909: Wisconsin

Coaching career (HC unless noted)

Football
- 1910–1911: Washington State

Head coaching record
- Overall: 5–6
Medal record
Men's weightlifting
Representing the United States
Olympic Games
| Gold medal – first place | 1904 St. Louis | All-around dumbbell |
| Silver medal – second place | 1904 St. Louis | Two hand lift |

Oscar Paul Osthoff (March 23, 1883 – December 9, 1950) was an American athlete and coach. Osthoff won the gold medal in the all-around dumbbell event and the silver medal in the two hand lift competition at the 1904 Summer Olympics. He later attended the University of Wisconsin–Madison, where he lettered in four sports, he also was the sec of the athletic dept. he attended Marquette University his freshman year, he is in the University of Wisconsin athletic hall of fame. : football, track and field, gymnastics, and swimming. Osthoff served as the head football coach at Washington State College—now Washington State University—from 1910 to 1911, compiling a record of 5–6.

== Head coaching record ==
| Year | Team | Overall | Conference | Standing | Bowl/playoffs |
|---|---|---|---|---|---|
Washington State (Northwest Conference) (1910–1911)
| 1910 | Washington State | 2–3 | 1–3 | 5th | |
| 1911 | Washington State | 3–3 | 2–3 | 4th | |
| Washington State: | | 5–6 | 3–6 | | |
| Total: | | 5–6 | | | |
