= Milwaukee Athletic Club =

Coordinates: 43°02′25.1″N 87°54′27.4″W

The Milwaukee Athletic Club
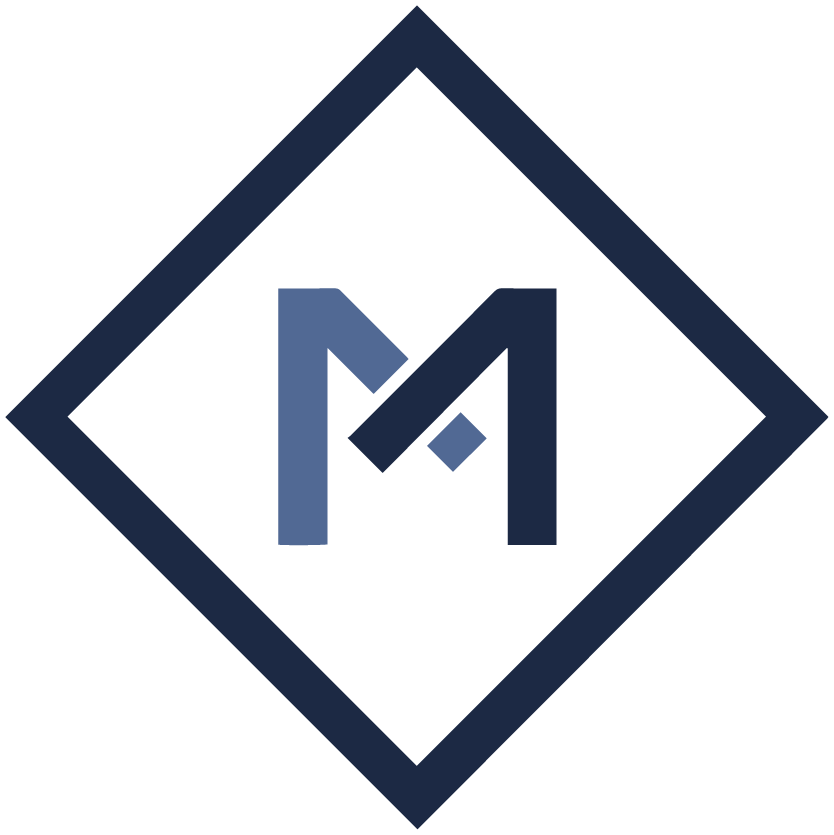
- Type: Private club
- Founded: Milwaukee, Wisconsin, 1882
- Headquarters: Milwaukee, Wisconsin
- Website: www.macwi.org

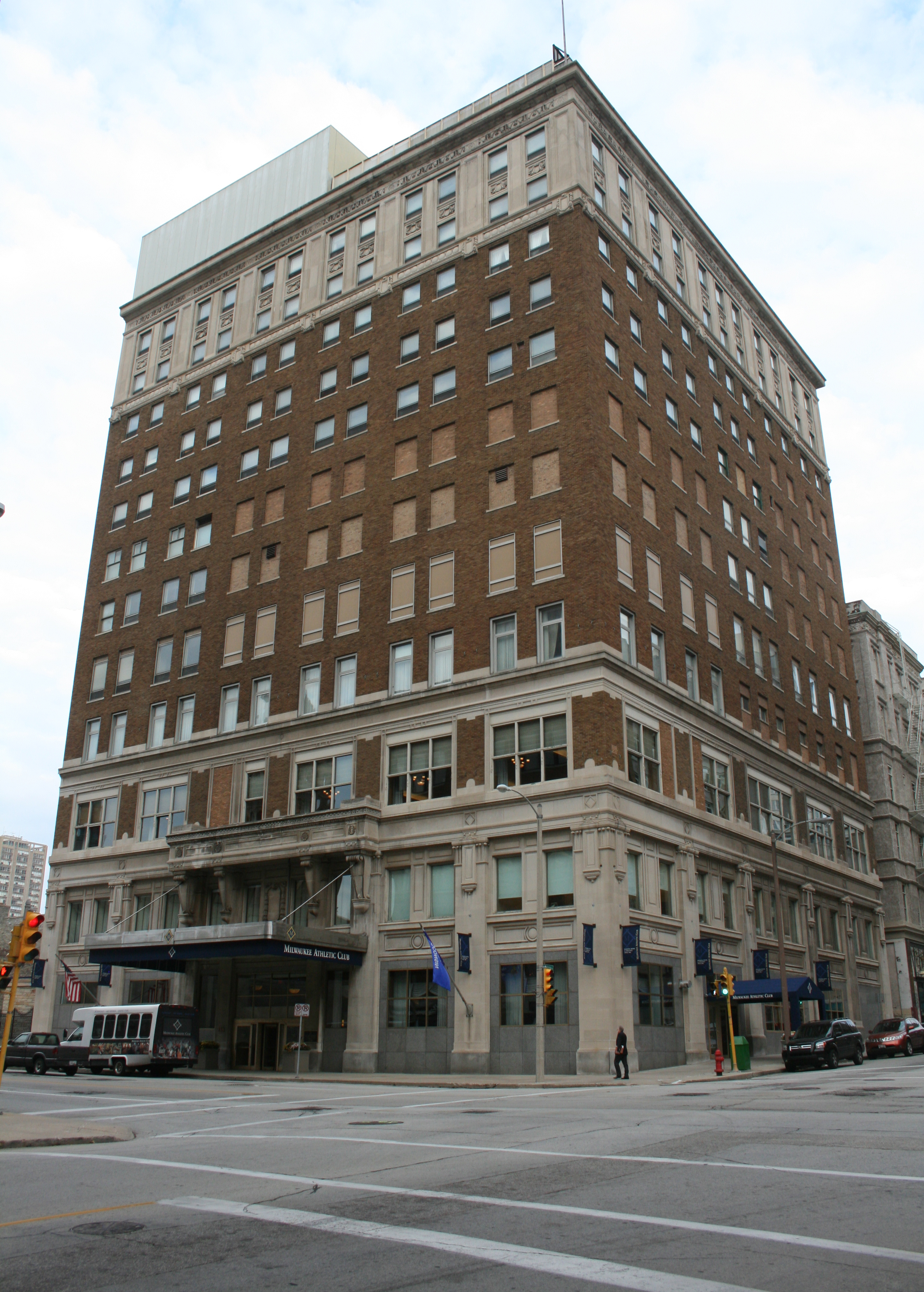
Clubhouse in 2010

The Milwaukee Athletic Club (often referred to as The MAC), is a private, social and full-service athletic club.

== History ==
Eight young men founded the Milwaukee Athletic Club on September 18, 1882, for the express purpose of "developing of the bodily powers through gymnastic and other exercises." Soon thereafter, the MAC joined the Amateur Athletic Union (AAU); members participated in several early Summer Olympics, including the 1904 Summer Olympics held in St. Louis, where its tug of war team won the gold medal. As part of the AAU, the MAC formed basketball, swimming, track, baseball, and other teams, which competed throughout the United States.

The MAC was housed in nine different buildings before establishing its present clubhouse in 1917. The total investment in land, building and equipment was over two million dollars at the time.

In 1954, the club performed a nine-year restoration. In that year the club constructed the 13-story building, designed by Armand Koch with its exterior in Neoclassical style, resembling a column with the bottom three stories (the column's base) sheathed in stone veneer, the middle stories plain brick, and the top two in stone veneer - the column's capital. Beneath the veneer is a steel skeleton. In 1954 a renovation of the interior was designed by Eschweiler & Eschweiler, adding the Bali Room, the Men's Lounge, and the Elephant Room.

== Renovation ==
In 2021, the club finished a four-year $65 million investment to renovate the entire 12-story building by developers J. Jeffers & Co and Interstate Development Partners. CG Schmidt was the general contractor and Kahler Slater was the architect.

The transformation includes 54 apartments, a rebuilt pool, new athletic facilities, a rooftop restaurant, an updated lobby, virtual golf suites, and more. The redesign also opens the ground floor to the street level to club members, guests, residents and the public. The building's new apartments are a mix of one, two and three-bedroom units located on the top five floors. This project stands as the second-largest development to be financed with State of Wisconsin historic preservation tax credits.

== Clubhouse ==
The club is headquartered at 758 North Broadway, at the corner of East Mason Street.

On the club's facade is a noted limestone sculpture, "Diana," installed in 1954. The building was listed on the National Register of Historic Places in 2019.

=== The Elephant Room ===
The mid-century cocktail lounge built in 1948 is popular among members and available to the public.

=== Rooftop Bar ===
On the 13th floor of the Milwaukee Athletic Club is a restaurant and outdoor terrace overlooking downtown Milwaukee where members have exclusive access.

=== Affinity Clubs ===
The. Milwaukee Athletic Club offers specialized groups called "affinity Clubs" where their members connect based on their shared interests such as books, sports, or community outreach.

== Culture ==
The Milwaukee Athletic Club promotes socializing and networking aimed at business professionals with numerous events throughout the year.

== Notable members ==
- T C Esser, entrepreneur
- Patrick Flanagan, American Olympic athlete
- Sidney Johnson, American Olympic athlete
- Herb Kohl, U.S. Senator
- Conrad Magnusson, American Olympic athlete
- Charles Manegold Jr., entrepreneur
- Oscar Olson, American Olympic athlete
- Richard R. Pieper, entrepreneur
- George Poage, first African American athlete to win a medal in the Olympic Games
- Henry Seiling, American Olympic athlete
- Al Simmons, Baseball Hall of Fame
- Christian Steinmetz, early basketball star
- Frank Waller, American Olympic athlete
- Hugo Teweles, Milwaukee Business Owner
- Sidney G Courteen, Milwaukee Business Owner, and former MAC president
