= Diana (Wiken) =

Sculpture by Adoph Roegner

Coordinates: 43°02′25.1″N 87°54′27.4″W

- Artist: Dick Wiken (design) and Adolph Roegner (carving)
- Year: 1954
- Type: limestone
- Dimensions: 120 cm × 120 cm (48 in × 48 in)
- Location: Milwaukee, Wisconsin
- Owner: Milwaukee Athletic Club

Diana is a public art work designed by American artist Dick Wiken and carved by Adoph Roegner, formerly located in downtown Milwaukee, Wisconsin. The carved limestone depicts the Roman goddess Diana seated and surrounded by fish, cattails and a unicorn. It was located on the facade of the Milwaukee Athletic Club but has since been removed and sold to a private collector.
