= Charles James Kershaw =

Charles James Kershaw was a businessman born in Burnley, Lancashire, England, in 1832. He came to America in 1841, and received his education at the Derby Line Academy, in Derby Line, Orleans County, Vermont. He came West in 1853, and engaged in a general trade in provisions, grain and flour, both in Milwaukee and Chicago, and made Milwaukee his permanent home in 1861. He died while visiting family members in Tacoma, Washington, in May 1910.

== C. J. Kershaw & Co. ==
He continued the produce and commission business alone till 1867 during which years he formed a co-partnership with Greenleaf D. Norris, which occurred in 1870, at that time Mr. Joseph P. Hill becoming associated with him under the firm name of C.J. Kershaw & Co.

=== Kershaw bankruptcy and reorganization ===
This business conducted grain brokerage on the Chicago Board of Trade. Due to the defalcation of a major client who was attempting a speculative corner, Kershaw & Co. was forced into bankruptcy in 1887. Issues in the case were considered sufficiently important as to make it to the United States Supreme Court as Armstrong vs American Exchange National Bank. The business was reorganized with an injection of new capital from the Kershaw family.

=== Howard Cranston Potter ===
Charles Kershaw's daughter, Alice, was married to Howard Cranston Potter whose grandfather was James Brown among the founders of Brown Bros. & Co. and whose father Howard Potter was a senior partner in Brown, Shipley & Co.

== C.J. Kershaw & Sons ==
In addition to the commission business carried on by the above-named firm, Mr. Kershaw, commenced 1875 another co-partnership which carried on an extensive trade in lumber and salt. C.J. Kershaw & Sons were dealers in lumber, salt stucco, lime, etc. The lumber yards were located on the north side of Burnham's Slip, near the foot of Sixth Avenue. This area of Milwaukee is currently as of 2009 Clock Tower Acres. The business was established by proprietors in 1875. A directory published in 1881 describes the business. From fifty to seventy-five men were employed about the extensive yards. The sales aggregate was nearly 12,000,000 board feet (30,000 m^{3}) of lumber per year. This branch of the business was under the management of R. Stockwell, Jr., who had been superintendent of the yards since 1877. The house, with office at No. 68 West Water street, under a separate management, nearly controlled the salt trade of the city, and had a large shipping trade with the interior. This department conducting salt trade was under the superintendency of P.H. Kershaw, the junior partner of the house.

== Northwestern Grain Elevator ==
In 1876 he also entered into copartnership with Charles Manegold, Jr. under the firm name of C. Manegold, Jr. & Co., the firm owning and running the Northwestern Elevator. These varieties of business under the different styles mentioned being successfully and energetically carried on by Mr. Kershaw and his associates. He was an honored member of the Milwaukee Chamber of Commerce since 1861, and has served on every important committee, and as Vice-President of the Board. His reputation and business standing among his associates is untarnished, and his ability unquestioned.

== Family ==
Mr. Kershaw married Miss Mary E. Leavenworth, daughter of Colonel Jesse Henry Leavenworth. They had eight children, Phillip H. Kershaw, Charles J. Kershaw, Jr, Henry Kershaw, Thomas Kershaw, Leavenworth Kershaw, Alice, the wife of Howard Cranston Potter, Jessie Kershaw and Mabel the wife of Dr. Burton J. Lee, of New York. Charles James Kershaw's granddaughter Bertha Cranston Potter was the wife of William Boeing and his great-grandson was Burton J. Lee III, White House physician in the administration of George H.W. Bush.

== Wreck of the C.J. Kershaw ==
Charles James Kershaw participated in partnerships which invested in a number of ships which carried cargo on the Great Lakes. One of these was vessels was named after him, a wooden steamer of 1,324 gross tons, 223 feet (68 m) long, 37 feet (11 m) wide and 20 feet (6 m) draft which continued under the name C.J. Kershaw after it was sold. It passed through various owners and in and out then back into the ownership of William Mack. It was built in 1874 at Bay City, Michigan. It foundered in a storm on Chocolay Reef off Marquette, Michigan, on Lake Superior on the night of September 29, 1895. Due to the action of lifesavers none of the thirteen aboard died. As a result of its location it is one of the most popular dive sites in Northern Michigan.

== Sources ==
- History of Milwaukee
- US Supreme Court: Armstrong vs American Exchange National Bank

Public domain
History of Milwaukee Biographies
Nearly 4000 biographical sketches of pioneers and citizens
The Western Historical Company, Chicago
A.T. Andreas Proprietor, 1881
Milwaukee County Wisconsin Genealogy
