= S.G. Courteen =

Sidney G. Courteen
- Born: June 17, 1864; Monmouth, Wales
- Died: November 25, 1945 (aged 81); Wickenburg, Arizona
- Occupation: businessman
- Known for: founder of Courteen Seed Co.
- Spouse: Lena Bartlett
- Children: Herbert Courteen; Edith Courteen
- Father: Thomas Courteen

Sidney G. Courteen (1864–1945) was an American wholesale seed merchant of British descent.

== Early life ==
Sidney G. Courteen was born in Monmouth, Wales on June 17, 1864. His father, Thomas, was owner of a number of flour mills. In 1885, Courteen moved to Chicago and became a manager of the clover-seed department for the Albert Dickinson Company. Courteen married Lena Bartlett in 1894. They had two children, Herbert and Edith.

== Career ==
Courteen came to Milwaukee in 1892 where he started his own seed wholesale business, in the Menomonee Valley, named the Courteen Seed Company. The seed merchant started in a four-story building, called Courteen's Dock, then as the business grew Courteen built a large 8-story triangular building in downtown Milwaukee. The building was at the time one of the strongest and heaviest structures in the city, with the ability to carry a live load of 400 pounds per square foot. The building provided about 2 1/2 times as much space as his previous building. The building was designed and erected by The Barnett & Record Co. In 1909, the Courteen Seed Company ran nearly $2 million annually.

The Courteen Seed Company shipped products globally and used the slogan "Known the World Over." In 1914, the Courteen Seed Co. was found guilty in selling noxious weed seed, Buckhorn, in their alsike clover stock and were required to pay a fine. Courteen was known as a man of indomitable energy, push, keen, shrewd and intelligent in his business judgments.

Courteen Seed Company went out of business in the early 1960s. Courteen was a director of the Wisconsin Central Railway, and president of Milwaukee Chamber of Commerce and of the Milwaukee Athletic Club.

Courteen died November 25, 1945, in Wickenburg, Arizona.
