= William Seiling =

American tug of war competitor

Olympic medal record

Men's Tug of war

Representing the United States
Silver medal – second place	1904 St. Louis	Team competition

William Bernard Seiling (May 28, 1864 – January 6, 1951) was an American tug of war athlete who competed in the 1904 Summer Olympics. He was born in St. Louis, Missouri and died in Rural-Meramec. In the 1904 Olympics he won a silver medal as a member of Southwest Turnverein of Saint Louis No. 1 team.
