= Max Braun =

Olympic tug of war competitor

Olympic medal record

Men's tug of war

Representing the United States
Silver medal – second place	1904 St. Louis	Team

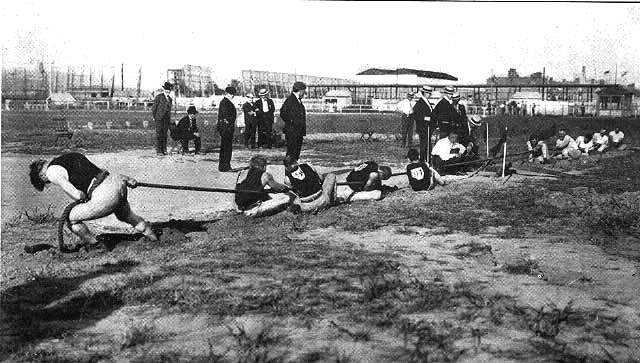

Max Braun (March 12, 1883 – May 1967 in Miami) was an American tug of war competitor and Olympic medalist. He competed in the 1904 Summer Olympics in St. Louis, where he received a silver medal.
