= T. C. Esser =

Theodore Clemens Esser (February 14, 1871 — ?) was the president of the T.C. Esser Company and was engaged in the manufacture and distribution of paint in Milwaukee for more than half a century; the firm also handled all kinds of glass, including stained glass for churches, and did vitrolite and metal store front construction work. Theodore C. Esser is the great-grandfather of Mark J. Seitz, bishop of the Diocese of El Paso.

== History ==
His father had come from Germany in young manhood and settled on a farm in Wisconsin, but he always suffered from ill health and left the farm to establish his home in Aurora, where Theodore Clemens Esser was born. The family numbered eight children, and because of the father's inability to work much of the time it was necessary that Theodore C. and some of the other children should early provide for their own support.

Educational opportunities were necessarily limited and by the age of twelve Theodore C. Esser had to put aside his textbooks. He sought and obtained a position in a paint shop, where he was paid a wage of fifty cents per day. There he gained his initial knowledge of the business in which he was destined to progress to the point of notable success. After a year he entered the employ of the W. S. Frazier Road Cart Company of Aurora, large manufacturers of sulkies, road carts, buggies and other horse-drawn vehicles. While there he learned the nature of colors and the methods of grinding and mixing them, working for many hours a day at a stone slab with a flat bottomed conical stone. Working at various phases of the business in time he became an expert carriage painter and by the age of sixteen he was earning nine dollars a week. It was about this time that his father died.

At the age of twenty Theodore C. Esser was a full-fledged painter, engaged on piece work that brought him from $18 to $27 per week. He next contracted to do a painting job for the Chicago, Burlington & Quincy Railroad Company in Chicago and when he finished the work four months later he became a roof-slater at Clinton, Iowa, still working for the railroad company. In 1892 he decided to visit Milwaukee, where he had a sister living, and find out what kind of a city it was. Within a few days he had secured employment — a painting job — with the Milwaukee Buggy Company, but when a week had passed he was called home to Aurora through the serious illness of his mother. When he returned a little later he brought with him his wife, for during the absence from Milwaukee he had married Miss Lena Gengler of Aurora. He again found employment with the Milwaukee Buggy Company, but the pay was only seven dollars and a half per week and feeling that he could do better at piece work he arranged with the company to finish six hundred gears and wheels for a stipulated sum, and in that way earned from twenty-five to thirty dollars per week. Thus step by step he advanced toward the goal of success, although not all days in his active career were equally bright. After doing contract work until the fall of 1893 Mr. Esser took sixty dollars that he had saved, bought some equipment for painting and established a business of his own at Thirty-third and Cherry streets in a room above a blacksmith shop.

== Business career ==
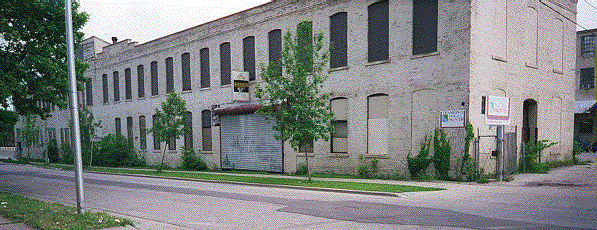
Front of the old Esser Paint factory, circa 2000

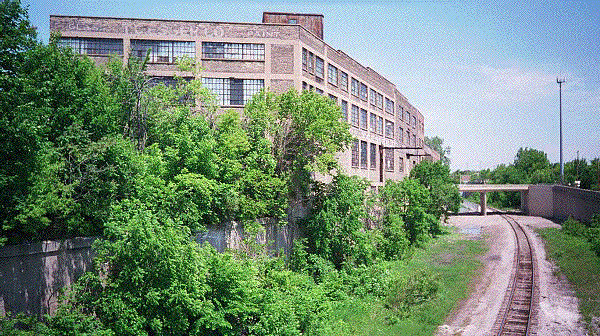
Rear of the old factory building, showing the old Milwaukee Road railroad tracks along the 30th Street Industrial Corridor, circa 2000

From that time forward Esser prospered. In 1894 he purchased a building at the corner of Thirty-third and Cherry streets using the ground floor for his shop and the second floor as his living quarters. In 1897 he purchased a cottage with a shop in the rear and sold his first building. During this time his contracting business was steadily growing and in 1902 he erected a fine brick store on North Avenue and Thirty Fourth Street. In 1909 he decided to relinquish the contracting business, although in this connection he was employing from twenty-five to fifty men, and concentrate on the store, the business including the manufacture as well as sale of paints. In 1910 he added a line of window glass and in 1912 began dealing in plate glass. By 1918 his trade in glass had reached such proportions that he was obliged to build a special warehouse to accommodate the stock and in 1920 he erected a brick factory building on Thirty fourth street, across the alley from the rear of his store. There he began manufacturing his own paint, and the growth of his business led to the addition of other units to his plant, and in 1925 to the glass warehouse on Thirty-Second Street. In 1927 he purchased the property at 3107 West Galena Street, which he then used for his office and display room purposes. In the same year he purchased the business of the Baranowski Art Glass Company of Oshkosh, later doubling his facilities there. The entire property was later used for the distribution of paints to Milwaukee. In 1934 a building was acquired in Lacrosse for the distribution of their products in the Northwest. They purchased Menominee, Michigan, Stained Glass Company in June 1940 and changed its name to the Menominee Paint and Glass Company. This plant was used for the distribution of their products in upper Michigan.

Esser was one of the most substantial and prosperous citizens of Milwaukee, making his home at 2232 North Sherman Boulevard. He also had a summer home on Moose Lake about thirty miles from the city. He spent his winter months in Florida. For a number of years he was also connected with banking interests, first as a director, then as vice president and later as president of the Wisconsin State Savings Bank, and in 1921 he organized the Pinelawn Cemetery Association, of which he was the leading stockholder until 1932, when he disposed of his interests. His prominence in trade circles was indicated in the fact that he served as president of the Milwaukee Paint, Oil & Varnish Club and was a member of the committee that met in his home and drew up the code of ethics which was later adopted by the National Paint, Oil & Varnish Association. He was a member in the Milwaukee Athletic Club and was a fourth degree member of the Knights of Columbus.
