= Charles Dieges =

American tug of war competitor

Personal information
- Born: October 26, 1865; New York, New York, United States
- Died: September 14, 1953 (aged 87); Jamaica, New York, United States

Sport
- Sport: Tug of war

Charles Dieges (October 26, 1865 – September 14, 1953) was an American tug of war athlete who competed in the tug of war tournament at the 1904 Summer Olympics.
