= Orrin Upshaw =

American tug of war competitor

Olympic medal record

Men's Tug of war

Representing the United States
| Silver medal – second place | 1904 St. Louis | Team competition |

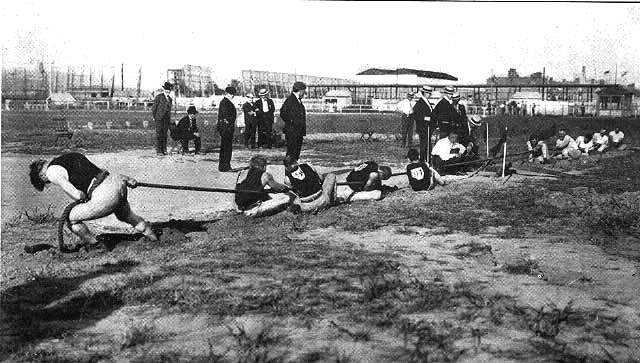
1904 tug of war

Orrin Thomas Upshaw (July 23, 1874 – August 15, 1937) was an American tug of war athlete who competed in the 1904 Summer Olympics. In the 1904 Olympics, he won a silver medal as a member of Southwest Turnverein of Saint Louis No. 1 team. He was born in WaKeeney, Kansas and died in St. Louis, Missouri.
