= Tug of war at the 1904 Summer Olympics =

Men's tug of war at the Games of the III Olympiad
- Venue: Francis Field
- Dates: August 31, 1904; September 1, 1904
- Competitors: 30 from 3 nations

Medalists
1st place, gold medalist(s)		Milwaukee Athletic Club; United States
2nd place, silver medalist(s)		Southwest Turnverein of St. Louis No. 1 United States
3rd place, bronze medalist(s)		Southwest Turnverein of St. Louis No. 2 United States

A tug of war competition was held August 31 and September 1 at Francis Field in St. Louis, Missouri, as part of the 1904 Summer Olympics. Thirty athletes participated from six teams across three countries, and six games were played. Four American teams took the top four places, followed by Greek and South African teams unplaced.

== Background ==
Tug of war was first held during the 1900 Olympics, when it was won by a mixed team from Scandinavia, featuring three Danish and three Swedish athletes. For the 1904 games in St. Louis, six teams entered. Four of the teams were representing the host nation, the United States, while there were also teams from Greece and South Africa. For the United States, the Milwaukee Athletic Club entered a team, the Southwest Turnverein of St. Louis entered two teams, and the New York Athletic Club were the final entrant. A team from the Pan-Hellenic Athletic Club represented Greece, while South Africa was represented by the Boer Team. The contests were held on turf ground with no shoes on, over a period of five minutes. If within that five minutes, a team succeeded in pulling the other team across a line six feet (1.83 m) from their starting position, they were deemed to win. Otherwise, the team that had pulled their opponents closest to the line after five minutes would be the winner. Three local judges were selected to officiate in the competition; Clark Hetherington of the University of Missouri, and John Meyers and Myles McDonough, both of St. Louis.

== Results ==
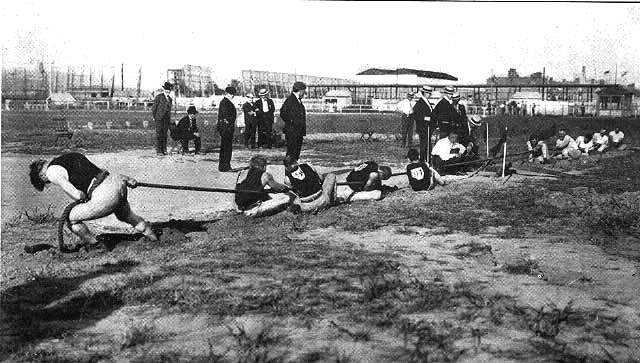
Tug of war competition at the 1904 Games

August 30 was the first day of the tug-of-war competition, with the two quarterfinal matches and the first semi-final match (between the two teams who had byes in the quarterfinals) being held. The rest of the competition was conducted on 1 September.

=== Quarterfinals ===
Losers were eliminated.

Winner	Loser
Milwaukee Athletic Club (USA)	Boers (RSA)
Southwest Turnverein of Saint Louis No. 1 (USA)	Pan-Hellenic (GRE)
New York Athletic Club (USA)	Bye
Southwest Turnverein of Saint Louis No. 2 (USA)	Bye

=== Semifinals ===
The losers were sent to the repechage to face each other: the winner would face the loser of the final for second place.

Winner	Loser
Milwaukee Athletic Club (USA)	Southwest Turnverein of Saint Louis No. 1 (USA)
New York Athletic Club (USA)	Southwest Turnverein of Saint Louis No. 2 (USA)

=== Final ===
The winner received the gold medal, while the loser had to face the winner of the repechage in the silver medal match.

Winner	Loser
Milwaukee Athletic Club (USA)	New York Athletic Club (USA)

=== Silver medal semifinal ===
The winner of this match faced the loser of the final for the silver medal.

Winner	Loser
Southwest Turnverein of Saint Louis No. 1 (USA)	Southwest Turnverein of Saint Louis No. 2 (USA)

=== Silver and bronze medal matches ===
The New York team failed to appear for either the silver medal match or the bronze medal match: both matches were scratched, with the silver medal being awarded to the Saint Louis No. 1 team and the bronze medal being awarded to the Saint Louis No. 2 team.

== Final standings ==
Place	Team	Nation
1st place, gold medalist(s)	Milwaukee Athletic Club	United States
2nd place, silver medalist(s)	Southwest Turnverein of Saint Louis No. 1	United States
3rd place, bronze medalist(s)	Southwest Turnverein of Saint Louis No. 2	United States
4	New York Athletic Club	United States
5–6	Pan-Hellenic	Greece
5–6	Boers	South Africa

== Participating nations ==
6 teams of 5, for a total of 30 athletes, competed. The host team had four teams, and two other nations each sent one.

- Greece (5)
- South Africa (5)
- United States (20)

== Rosters ==
Milwaukee Athletic Club
United States
Patrick Flanagan
Sidney Johnson
Conrad Magnusson
Henry Seiling
Oscar Olsen (NOR)

Southwest Turnverein of St. Louis No. 1
United States
Max Braun
August Rodenberg
Charles Rose
William Seiling
Orrin Upshaw

Southwest Turnverein of St. Louis No. 2
United States
Oscar Friede
Charles Haberkorn
Harry Jacobs
Charles Thias
Frank Kugler (GER)

New York Athletic Club
United States
Charles Chadwick
Charles Dieges
Lawrence Feuerbach
Sam Jones
Jim Mitchel

Boer Team
South Africa
Pieter Hillense
Pieter Lombard
Johannes Schutte
Paulus Visser
Christopher Walker

Pan-Hellenic Athletic Club
Greece
Dimitrios Dimitrakopoulos
Nikolaos Georgantas
Anastasios Georgopoulos
Periklis Kakousis
Vasilios Metalos

== Medal table ==
Rank	Nation	Gold	Silver	Bronze	Total
1	United States	1	1	1	3
Totals (1 entries)		1	1	1	3

== Sources ==
- Lucas, Charles J. P. (1905). The Olympic Games, 1904 (PDF). St. Louis, Missouri: Woodward & Tiernan Printing Co.
- Mallon, Bill (1999). The 1904 Olympic Games: Results for All Competitors in All Events, with Commentary. Jefferson, North Carolina: McFarland & Company, Inc. ISBN 978-0-7864-4066-5.
- Wudarski, Pawel (1999). "Wyniki Igrzysk Olimpijskich" (in Polish).
