= Sidney Johnson (tug of war) =

American tug of war competitor

Medal record

Men's tug of war

Representing the United States

Olympic Games
Gold medal – first place	1904 St. Louis	Team competition

Sidney B. Johnson (born 1877, date of death unknown) was an American tug of war athlete who competed in the 1904 Summer Olympics. He was born in Ohio. In the 1904 Olympics he won a gold medal as a member of the Milwaukee Athletic Club team.
