= Periklis Kakousis =

Greek weightlifter (1879–1939)

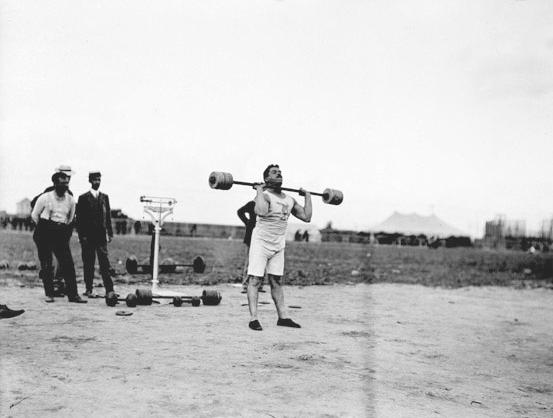
- Kakousis in 1904.

Medal record

Men's Weightlifting

Representing Greece

Olympic Games
Gold medal – first place	1904 St. Louis	Two hand lift

Periklis Kakousis (Greek: Περικλής Κακούσης, 1879 – 1939) was a Greek weightlifter who competed in the 1904 Summer Olympics and in the 1906 Summer Olympics. At the 1904 Olympics he won a gold medal in the two hand lift event. Two years later he finished sixth in the two hand lift competition at the 1906 Intercalated Games.
