= Weightlifting at the Summer Olympics =

- IOC Code: WLF
- Governing body: IWF
- Events: 10 (men: 5; women: 5)

Summer Olympics
- 1896; 1900; 1904; 1908; 1912; 1920; 1924; 1928; 1932; 1936; 1948; 1952; 1956; 1960; 1964; 1968; 1972; 1976; 1980; 1984; 1988; 1992; 1996; 2000; 2004; 2008; 2012; 2016; 2020; 2024; 2028; 2032
- Medalists; Records

Weightlifting has been contested at every Summer Olympic Games since the 1920 Summer Olympics, in Antwerp, Belgium, as well as twice before then. It debuted at the 1896 Summer Olympics, in Athens, Greece, and was also an event at the 1904 Games.

== Summary ==
Games	Year	Events	Best Nation
1	1896	2	Denmark (1); Great Britain (1)
2			
3	1904	2	United States (1)
4			
5			
6			
7	1920	5	France (1)
8	1924	5	Italy (1)
9	1928	5	Germany (1)
10	1932	5	France (2)
11	1936	5	Egypt (1)
12			
13			
14	1948	6	United States (2)
15	1952	7	United States (3)
16	1956	7	United States (4)
17	1960	7	Soviet Union (1)
18	1964	7	Soviet Union (2)
19	1968	7	Soviet Union (3)
20	1972	9	Bulgaria (1)
21	1976	9	Soviet Union (4)
22	1980	10	Soviet Union (5)
23	1984	10	China (1)
24	1988	10	Soviet Union (6)
25	1992	10	Unified Team (1)
26	1996	10	Greece (1)
27	2000	15	China (2)
28	2004	15	China (3)
29	2008	15	China (4)
30	2012	15	China (5)
31	2016	15	China (6)
32	2020	14	China (7)
33	2024	10	China (8)
34	2028	12	

== Events ==
=== Men's events ===
In the early Games, all lifters competed in the same events, regardless of their individual body weights.

1896

- One hand lift
- Two hand lift

1904

- Two hand lift
- All-around dumbbell

When the sport returned to the Olympic Games in 1920, the competition was structured as a set of weight classes. The number of classes and weight limits for each class have changed several times, as shown in the following table.

1920–1936	1948	1952–1968	1972–1976	1980–1992	1996	2000–2016	2020	2024
Heavyweight +82.5 kg		Heavyweight +90 kg	Super heavyweight +110 kg		Super heavyweight +108 kg	Super heavyweight +105 kg	Super heavyweight +109 kg	Super heavyweight +102 kg
Heavyweight +82.5 kg		Heavyweight +90 kg	Heavyweight; 90–110 kg	Heavyweight; 100–110 kg	Super heavyweight +108 kg	Super heavyweight +105 kg	Super heavyweight +109 kg	Super heavyweight +102 kg
Heavyweight +82.5 kg		Heavyweight +90 kg	Heavyweight; 90–110 kg	Heavyweight; 100–110 kg	Super heavyweight +108 kg	Super heavyweight +105 kg	Heavyweight; 96–109 kg	Super heavyweight +102 kg
Heavyweight +82.5 kg		Heavyweight +90 kg	Heavyweight; 90–110 kg	Heavyweight; 100–110 kg	Heavyweight; 99–108 kg	Super heavyweight +105 kg	Heavyweight; 96–109 kg	Super heavyweight +102 kg
Heavyweight +82.5 kg		Heavyweight +90 kg	Heavyweight; 90–110 kg	Heavyweight; 100–110 kg	Heavyweight; 99–108 kg	Heavyweight; 94–105 kg	Heavyweight; 96–109 kg	Super heavyweight +102 kg
Heavyweight +82.5 kg		Heavyweight +90 kg	Heavyweight; 90–110 kg	Heavyweight; 100–110 kg	Heavyweight; 99–108 kg	Heavyweight; 94–105 kg	Heavyweight; 96–109 kg	Heavyweight; 89–102 kg
Heavyweight +82.5 kg		Heavyweight +90 kg	Heavyweight; 90–110 kg	First-heavyweight; 90–100 kg	Heavyweight; 99–108 kg	Heavyweight; 94–105 kg	Heavyweight; 96–109 kg	Heavyweight; 89–102 kg
Heavyweight +82.5 kg		Heavyweight +90 kg	Heavyweight; 90–110 kg	First-heavyweight; 90–100 kg	First-heavyweight; 91–99 kg	Heavyweight; 94–105 kg	Heavyweight; 96–109 kg	Heavyweight; 89–102 kg
Heavyweight +82.5 kg		Heavyweight +90 kg	Heavyweight; 90–110 kg	First-heavyweight; 90–100 kg	First-heavyweight; 91–99 kg	Heavyweight; 94–105 kg	Middle-heavyweight; 81–96 kg	Heavyweight; 89–102 kg
Heavyweight +82.5 kg		Heavyweight +90 kg	Heavyweight; 90–110 kg	First-heavyweight; 90–100 kg	First-heavyweight; 91–99 kg	Middle-heavyweight; 85–94 kg	Middle-heavyweight; 81–96 kg	Heavyweight; 89–102 kg
Heavyweight +82.5 kg		Heavyweight +90 kg	Heavyweight; 90–110 kg	First-heavyweight; 90–100 kg	Middle-heavyweight; 83–91 kg	Middle-heavyweight; 85–94 kg	Middle-heavyweight; 81–96 kg	Heavyweight; 89–102 kg
Heavyweight +82.5 kg		Middle-heavyweight; 82.5–90 kg			Middle-heavyweight; 83–91 kg	Middle-heavyweight; 85–94 kg	Middle-heavyweight; 81–96 kg	Heavyweight; 89–102 kg
Heavyweight +82.5 kg		Middle-heavyweight; 82.5–90 kg			Middle-heavyweight; 83–91 kg	Middle-heavyweight; 85–94 kg	Middle-heavyweight; 81–96 kg	Middleweight; 73–89 kg
Heavyweight +82.5 kg		Middle-heavyweight; 82.5–90 kg			Middle-heavyweight; 83–91 kg	Light-heavyweight; 77–85 kg	Middle-heavyweight; 81–96 kg	Middleweight; 73–89 kg
Heavyweight +82.5 kg		Middle-heavyweight; 82.5–90 kg			Light-heavyweight; 76–83 kg	Light-heavyweight; 77–85 kg	Middle-heavyweight; 81–96 kg	Middleweight; 73–89 kg
Light-heavyweight; 75–82.5 kg					Light-heavyweight; 76–83 kg	Light-heavyweight; 77–85 kg	Middle-heavyweight; 81–96 kg	Middleweight; 73–89 kg
Light-heavyweight; 75–82.5 kg					Light-heavyweight; 76–83 kg	Light-heavyweight; 77–85 kg	Middleweight; 73–81 kg	Middleweight; 73–89 kg
Light-heavyweight; 75–82.5 kg					Light-heavyweight; 76–83 kg	Middleweight; 69–77 kg	Middleweight; 73–81 kg	Middleweight; 73–89 kg
Light-heavyweight; 75–82.5 kg					Middleweight; 70–76 kg	Middleweight; 69–77 kg	Middleweight; 73–81 kg	Middleweight; 73–89 kg
Middleweight; 67.5–75 kg					Middleweight; 70–76 kg	Middleweight; 69–77 kg	Middleweight; 73–81 kg	Middleweight; 73–89 kg
Middleweight; 67.5–75 kg					Middleweight; 70–76 kg	Middleweight; 69–77 kg	Lightweight; 67–73 kg	Lightweight; 61–73 kg
Middleweight; 67.5–75 kg					Lightweight; 64–70 kg	Middleweight; 69–77 kg	Lightweight; 67–73 kg	Lightweight; 61–73 kg
Middleweight; 67.5–75 kg					Lightweight; 64–70 kg	Lightweight; 62–69 kg	Lightweight; 67–73 kg	Lightweight; 61–73 kg
Lightweight; 60–67.5 kg					Lightweight; 64–70 kg	Lightweight; 62–69 kg	Lightweight; 67–73 kg	Lightweight; 61–73 kg
Lightweight; 60–67.5 kg					Lightweight; 64–70 kg	Lightweight; 62–69 kg	Featherweight; 61–67 kg	Lightweight; 61–73 kg
Lightweight; 60–67.5 kg					Featherweight; 59–64 kg	Lightweight; 62–69 kg	Featherweight; 61–67 kg	Lightweight; 61–73 kg
Lightweight; 60–67.5 kg					Featherweight; 59–64 kg	Featherweight; 56–62 kg	Featherweight; 61–67 kg	Lightweight; 61–73 kg
Lightweight; 60–67.5 kg					Featherweight; 59–64 kg	Featherweight; 56–62 kg	Bantamweight −61 kg	
Featherweight −60 kg	Featherweight; 56–60 kg				Featherweight; 59–64 kg	Featherweight; 56–62 kg	Bantamweight −61 kg	
Featherweight −60 kg	Featherweight; 56–60 kg				Bantamweight; 54–59 kg	Featherweight; 56–62 kg	Bantamweight −61 kg	
Featherweight −60 kg	Bantamweight −56 kg		Bantamweight; 52–56 kg		Bantamweight; 54–59 kg	Bantamweight −56 kg	Bantamweight −61 kg	
Featherweight −60 kg	Bantamweight −56 kg		Bantamweight; 52–56 kg		Flyweight −54 kg	Bantamweight −56 kg	Bantamweight −61 kg	
Featherweight −60 kg	Bantamweight −56 kg		Flyweight −52 kg		Flyweight −54 kg	Bantamweight −56 kg	Bantamweight −61 kg	
5	6	7	9	10	10	8	7	5

Weight class	20	24	28	32	36	48	52	56	60	64	68	72	76	80	84	88	92	96	00	04	08	12	16	20	24	Years
Super heavyweight												+110	+110	+110	+110	+110	+110	+108	+105	+105	+105	+105	+105	+109	+102	14
Heavyweight	+82.5	+82.5	+82.5	+82.5	+82.5	+82.5	+90	+90	+90	+90	+90	110	110	110	110	110	110	108	105	105	105	105	105	109	102	25
First-heavyweight														100	100	100	100	99								5
Middle-heavyweight							90	90	90	90	90	90	90	90	90	90	90	91	94	94	94	94	94	96		18
Light-heavyweight	82.5	82.5	82.5	82.5	82.5	82.5	82.5	82.5	82.5	82.5	82.5	82.5	82.5	82.5	82.5	82.5	82.5	83	85	85	85	85	85		89	24
Middleweight	75	75	75	75	75	75	75	75	75	75	75	75	75	75	75	75	75	76	77	77	77	77	77	81		24
Lightweight	67.5	67.5	67.5	67.5	67.5	67.5	67.5	67.5	67.5	67.5	67.5	67.5	67.5	67.5	67.5	67.5	67.5	70	69	69	69	69	69	73	73	25
Featherweight	60	60	60	60	60	60	60	60	60	60	60	60	60	60	60	60	60	64	62	62	62	62	62	67		24
Bantamweight						56	56	56	56	56	56	56	56	56	56	56	56	59	56	56	56	56	56	61	61	20
Flyweight												52	52	52	52	52	52	54								7
Total	5	5	5	5	5	6	7	7	7	7	7	9	9	10	10	10	10	10	8	8	8	8	8	7	5	186

Lift			96	04	20	24	28	32	36	48	52	56	60	64	68	72	76	80	84	88	92	96	00	04	08	12	16	20	Years
One hand lifts	One hand lift		X																										1
One hand lifts	All-around dumbbell			X																									1
One hand lifts	Clean and jerk					X																							1
One hand lifts	Snatch					X																							1
Two hand lifts	Two hand lift		X	X																									2
Two hand lifts	Clean and jerk					X	X	X	X	X				X		X		X	X	X	X	X	X	X	X	X	X	X	
Two hand lifts	Clean and press					X	X	X	X	X				X															
Two hand lifts	Military press															X													
Two hand lifts	Snatch					X	X	X	X	X				X		X		X	X	X	X	X	X	X	X	X	X	X	
Two hand lifts	Totals	Biathlon																X	X	X	X	X	X	X	X	X	X	X	
Two hand lifts	Totals	Triathlon					X	X	X	X				X		X													
Mixed totals						X																							1

=== Women's events ===
Women's weightlifting made its Olympic debut at the 2000 Games in Sydney, with seven weight classes.

Weight class	00	04	08	12	16	20	24	Years
+75..+87 kg	+75	+75	+75	+75	+75	+87	+81	7
75..87 kg	75	75	75	75	75	87	81	7
69..76 kg	69	69	69	69	69	76	71	7
63..64 kg	63	63	63	63	63	64		6
58..59 kg	58	58	58	58	58	59	59	7
53..55 kg	53	53	53	53	53	55		6
48..49 kg	48	48	48	48	48	49	49	7
Total	7	7	7	7	7	7	5	47

== Medal table ==
As of the 2024 Summer Olympics and Court of Arbitration for Sport decision of March 2022 to disqualify a gold medalist in the weightlifting men's 77kg event at the 2016 Summer Olympics (medals in this event have not yet been reallocated as of August 2024).

Rank	Nation	Gold	Silver	Bronze	Total
1	China	43	16	8	67
2	Soviet Union	39	21	2	62
3	United States	17	17	14	48
4	Bulgaria	13	17	9	39
5	Iran	9	6	5	20
6	France	9	4	9	22
7	Turkey	8	1	2	11
8	Germany	6	7	7	20
9	Poland	6	6	22	34
10	Greece	6	5	4	15
11	North Korea	5	8	5	18
12	Italy	5	5	8	18
13	Thailand	5	4	8	17
14	Egypt	5	4	6	15
15	Unified Team	5	4	0	9
16	Russia	4	7	6	17
17	Chinese Taipei	4	2	5	11
18	Georgia	4	1	3	8
19	South Korea	3	7	7	17
20	Austria	3	4	2	9
21	Czechoslovakia	3	2	3	8
22	Hungary	2	9	9	20
23	Romania	2	7	3	12
24	Colombia	2	6	3	11
25	Japan	2	3	10	15
26	Canada	2	3	1	6
27	West Germany	2	2	3	7
28	Cuba	2	1	5	8
29	Ukraine	2	1	2	5
30	Uzbekistan	2	1	1	4
31	Norway	2	0	0	2
32	Indonesia	1	7	8	16
33	East Germany	1	4	6	11
33	Kazakhstan	1	4	6	11
35	Great Britain	1	4	4	9
36	Belarus	1	4	3	8
37	Estonia	1	3	3	7
38	Belgium	1	2	1	4
39	Denmark	1	2	0	3
40	Australia	1	1	2	4
40	Ecuador	1	1	2	4
42	Spain	1	1	1	3
43	Philippines	1	1	0	2
44	Mexico	1	0	3	4
45	Finland	1	0	2	3
46	Croatia	1	0	1	2
46	Qatar	1	0	1	2
48	Armenia	0	5	2	7
49	Switzerland	0	2	2	4
50	Venezuela	0	2	1	3
51	Latvia	0	1	2	3
51	Trinidad and Tobago	0	1	2	3
53	Argentina	0	1	1	2
53	Dominican Republic	0	1	1	2
53	India	0	1	1	2
53	Nigeria	0	1	1	2
53	Vietnam	0	1	1	2
58	Lebanon	0	1	0	1
58	Luxembourg	0	1	0	1
58	Samoa	0	1	0	1
58	Singapore	0	1	0	1
58	Turkmenistan	0	1	0	1
63	Sweden	0	0	4	4
64	Netherlands	0	0	3	3
65	Bahrain	0	0	1	1
65	Cameroon	0	0	1	1
65	Iraq	0	0	1	1
65	Lithuania	0	0	1	1
65	Syria	0	0	1	1
–	Individual Neutral Athletes	0	0	1	1
Totals (69 entries)		238	236	242	716

== Nations ==
Nation	96	00	04	08	12	20	24	28	32	36	48	52	56	60	64	68	72	76	80	84	88	92	96	00	04	08	12	16	20	24	Years	
Albania																	1					3	1	1	2	3	4	2	2		9	
Algeria																			3	2	2	2	3	1	2	1	1	2	1	1	12	
American Samoa																					2	1	1	1	1			1	1		7	
Argentina							3	3	1		8	5	2		2	1						2	3	2	2	1		1			14	
Armenia																							10	4	4	6	6	7	2	3	7	
Aruba																							1		1		1				3	
Australia											2	3	7	7	7	2	3	3	5	4	4	4	7	12	2	2	2	2	5	3	20	
Austria							15	10	2	10	6	4	2	4	3	1	6	5	3	6	1				1			1	2		18	
Azerbaijan																							2	4	5	5	6				5	
Barbados																1	1														2	
Belarus																							9	5	8	10	8	8	2		7	
Bahrain																														2	1	
Belgium						7	8	8			3	2	1	2	1	2	1	1	3					2		1	1	1	2	1	18	
Belize																1															1	
Bolivia																					1	1				1					3	
Botswana																													1		1	
Bosnia and Herzegovina																						1									1	
Brazil												3	2	1		1	2	1	2		2	1	1	1		1	2	5	2	2	16	
British West Indies														1																	1	
Bulgaria													3	7	5	5	9	9	10		6	10	10	9	9		2		2	3	14	
Cameroon																					2	1	1		2	1	2	2	2		8	
Canada											5	5	3	3	3	4	4	4		7	3	2	2	2	2	5	3	2	5	2	19	
Chile																							1			1	2	2	2		5	
China																				10	10	10	10	10	10	10	10	10	8	6	11	
Chinese Taipei																				4	7	1	4	4	7	5	4	7	7	3	9	
Colombia													2	3			2	2		5	3	4	5	3	9	10	8	9	3	4	15	
Comoros																									1						1	
Cook Islands																					2	1	1		1	1	1	1			7	
Costa Rica																3					1										2	
Croatia																								1	1			1			3	
Cuba											3	1		1	1	5	6	9	9			8	5	5	2	6	4	2	4	1	17	
Cyprus																										1		1			2	
Czech Republic																							2	1	1	1	1	1	1	1	8	
Czechoslovakia						2	6	7	2	6		4	1	3	2	1	3	7	10		5	5									15	
Denmark	1					5		1	1		4	3					3	1	1	1	2	2									12	
Dominican Republic																2	1	2	1		4	1	1	2	1	1	2	3	5	3	14	
East Germany																3	8	7	9		4										5	
Ecuador																				1	3			1	2	2	4	3	4	3	9	
Egypt						1	1	2		8	8	6		7	5	3		2		10	5	5	1	2	5	5	8	9		5	19	
El Salvador																2							1	1	1	1	1	1			7	
Estonia						3	8	4		4																		1		1	6	
Fiji																							1	1	1	1	2	2			6	
Finland						1					4	7	1	2	4	5	9	5	7	5	4	4	2	1		1	1	2			18	
France						10	14	10	5	8	9	5	3	6	2	5	3	8	4	2	4	6	2	3	5	4	4	5	4	4	25	
Georgia																							1	3	2	3	3	4	4	3	8	
Germany	1		1					10	4	10		5										10	10	5	4	5	5	5	3		14	
Ghana																											1	1	1		3	
Great Britain	1					2	10	5		5	10	5	5	7	5	7	9	8	10	10	10	6	1	1	2	1	5	2	4	1	25	
Greece	3		1			1								1		2	4	4	5	9	4	5	10	8	10	4	1	1	1		18	
Guam																					2	1		1						1	4	
Guatemala																1		1	1	2		1	1	1	1	1	2	1			11	
Guyana											2	1	2		1	1									1						6	
Haiti														1														1			2	
Honduras																						1					1	1			3	
Hong Kong																											1				1	
Hungary	1									2	3	2		5	7	7	9	9	10		10	10	7	7	7	1	1	1	1		19	
Iceland																1	2	1	3												4	
India										1	2	2	3	1	2	1	1	1	2	4	2	3	5	3	3		2	2	1	1	19	
Independent Olympic Athletes																								1						2	2	
Individual Neutral Athletes																														2	2	
Indonesia												1	1	2		3	1	1		3	5	4	1	3	6	5	6	7	5	3	17	
Iran											5	7	7	5	5	4	3	7				5		6	6	3	6	5	2	2	16	
Iraq														5	7	1			5	2		5	1		1		1	1		1	11	
Ireland														2			1														2	
Israel														2			3	1		1		3	1					1	1		8	
Italy						5	15	6	4	4	1	6	4	7	2	3	6	1	3	3	6	3	2	4		4	1	2	4	3	24	
Jamaica											2					1				1											3	
Japan												1	5	7	7	7	9	9		9	10	10	7	8	4	6	5	7	7	3	18	
Kazakhstan																							7	6	3	8	8	8	2		7	
Kenya																				1	4	1	1				1	1			6	
Kiribati																									1	1	1	1		1	4	
Kuwait																						1	1								2	
Kyrgyzstan																								2	1	1	1	2	1		6	
Latvia							4	1														2	5	3	1	1	1	2	2	1	11	
Lebanon												1		2		1	1		2	1	3	1		1						1	10	
Libya																			2		2	1			2				1	1	5	
Lithuania								1															1	1	1	1		1	1		7	
Luxembourg						3	4	3		2				2																	5	
Madagascar																						1					1	1	2	1	5	
Malaysia													3	2																	2	
Malaysia															6	2									1	1		1		1	6	
Malta																												1	1		2	
Marshall Islands																												1		1	2	
Mauritius																					1		2	1	1	1		1	1		7	
Mexico											3	2	1	1	1	3	2	1	3	1				1	1	2	2	4	4	1	17	
Federated States of Micronesia																								1	1	1	1				4	
Moldova																							5	3	3	5	2	2	1	1	8	
Monaco															1											1					2	
Mongolia																	4		3			2			1	1		2	1	1	8	
Morocco														4	2							1	1		1			2	1		7	
Myanmar											1	2	3	2	3		1		1					3	1						9	
Nauru																							3	2	3	1	1	1	1		7	
Nepal																			2	2	1		1			1					5	
Netherlands						5	3	10			2	2				1													1		7	
Netherlands Antilles														5	3	2	1														4	
New Zealand											1	1	1	1	1	2	3	3		3	1			2		2	1	2	5	1	16	
Nicaragua																1		2		2		2		1		1	1	1	1		8	
Nigeria																			2	6	4	1	1	5	2	3	2	1		2	10	
North Korea																	1	3	5			10	2	4	4	7	8	8			10	
Norway												3		1		1	4	2					1		1	1				1	8	
Oman																													1		1	
Pakistan											2	1	3	2	1		1	2											1		7	
Palestine																													1		1	
Palau																								1			1				2	
Panama												1		1	1	2	2	2		3	2	1	1	1							11	
Papua New Guinea																					2	1	1	1	1	1	2	1	2	1	8	
Peru											3					1				2	1	1			1	1	1	2	1		9	
Philippines											1	2	2	2	1	3	3	2			3					1	1	2	2	3	12	
Poland												4	5	7	7	7	9	9	10		7	9	5	9	7	10	9	5	3	1	16	
Portugal							1	1						1		1	1		1	2	1		1								9	
Puerto Rico												3		2	4	6	6	2		1	2	1	1	2		1	1	1			14	
Qatar																								2	2			1		1	3	
Refugee Olympic Team																													1	2	1	
Republic of China																													1		1	
Republic of China										3			3	2	7	5	1														6	
Romania												4		2	2		2	1	10	10	4	6	5	5	7	5	4	4		2	15	
Russia																							9	9	9	10	10				5	
Samoa																				2	1	2	1	1	1	1	2	2		2	9	
San Marino																			1		1										2	
Saudi Arabia																							1		4		1	1	1		4	
Serbia																												1			1	
Serbia and Montenegro																							1								1	
Seychelles																							1	1	1	1		1			5	
Sierra Leone																					1			1							2	
Singapore												3	3	1		2		1									1				6	
Slovakia																							3	1	3	1	1	1			6	
Solomon Islands																				1	1	1	1			1	1	1	1		7	
South Africa											2	4	3	3								1				1	1				7	
South Korea											8	4	6	7	7	6	1			9	10	10	7	8	8	9	10	7	8	5	16	
Soviet Union												7	7	6	7	7	9	9	10		9										9	
Spain														2			1	1		4	6	6	1	3	2	2	2	4	4		12	
Sri Lanka																				1		1				1		1			4	
Sudan														2			1					1									3	
Swaziland																				1	2										2	
Sweden						6	5	2		2	4	7	1	1	3	2	2	5	6	6	3	5	2					1	1		19	
Switzerland						2	9	10		5	3	4		3	1		1	1		1											11	
Syria																			4	2	1		1			1	2	1	1	1	7	
Tajikistan																										1					1	
Thailand															4	2	1	1				1	1	5	5	7	7	9		4	11	
Tonga																						1	1	1		1			1		4	
Trinidad and Tobago											1	2	2		2	1															5	
Tunisia																				2		1		1	2	2	2	2	5	1	7	
Turkey							1	1							1		2	2		4	5	6	9	7	9	6	9	4	2	1	14	
Turkmenistan																								1	1	2	3	2	5	1	5	
Tuvalu																										1	1				2	
Uganda																				2	2		1		1		1				5	
Ukraine																							7	10	9	9	9	8	2	1	6	
Unified Team																						10									1	
United Team of Germany													2	7	6																3	
United Arab Emirates																											1	1			2	
United States									10	10	12	7	7	7	7	7	9	9		10	10	10	10	6	5	6	3	4	8	5	20	
Uruguay																					1	1	1					1			4	
Uzbekistan																							5	2	3	2	6	5	4	3	6	
Vanuatu																														1	1	
Venezuela														2					1		1	3	1	2	3	7	3	4	4	5	10	
Vietnam																									1	2	2	4	2	1	4	
Virgin Islands																1															1	
West Germany																5	7	6		6	7										5	
Yugoslavia																	2		2												2	
Zimbabwe																			1												1	
No. of nations	5		3			14	16	19	8	15	30	41	34	53	42	55	54	46	39	48	62	69	77	76	79	84	84	94	74	57		148
No. of athletes	7		5			53	107	95	29	80	120	142	105	172	149	160	188	173	172	186	226	244	243	246	249	253	259	260	196	122		2710
Year	96	00	04	08	12	20	24	28	32	36	48	52	56	60	64	68	72	76	80	84	88	92	96	00	04	08	12	16	20	24		

== Multiple medalists ==
The table shows those who have won at least 2 gold medals. Boldface denotes active weightlifters and highest medal count among all weightlifters (including these who not included in these tables) per type.

Rank	Weightlifter	Country	Gender	Weights	From	To	Gold	Silver	Bronze	Total
1	Pyrros Dimas	Greece	M	82.5 kg / 83 kg / 85 kg	1992	2004	**3**	–	1	**4**
2	**Lasha Talakhadze**	Georgia	M	+105 kg / +109 kg / +102 kg	2016	2024	**3**	–	–	3
2	**Lü Xiaojun**	China	M	77 kg / 81 kg	2012	2020	**3**	-	–	3
2	Akakios Kakiasvilis (Kakhi Kakhiashvili)	Unified Team; Greece	M	90 kg / 99 kg / 94 kg	1992	2000	**3**	–	–	3
2	Halil Mutlu	Turkey	M	54 kg / 56 kg	1996	2004	**3**	–	–	3
2	Naim Süleymanoğlu	Turkey	M	60 kg / 64 kg	1988	1996	**3**	–	–	3
7	Louis Hostin	France	M	82.5 kg	1928	1936	2	1	–	3
7	Tommy Kono	United States	M	67.5 kg / 75 kg / 82.5 kg	1952	1960	2	1	–	3
7	Yoshinobu Miyake	Japan	M	56 kg / 60 kg	1960	1968	2	1	–	3
10	Arkady Vorobyov	Soviet Union	M	82.5 kg / 90 kg	1952	1960	2	–	1	3
11	Vasily Alekseyev	Soviet Union	M	+110 kg	1972	1976	2	–	–	2
11	Waldemar Baszanowski	Poland	M	67.5 kg	1964	1968	2	–	–	2
11	Chen Yanqing	China	F	58 kg	2004	2008	2	–	–	2
11	John Davis	United States	M	+82.5 kg / +90 kg	1948	1952	2	–	–	2
11	Hsu Shu-ching	Chinese Taipei	F	53 kg	2012	2016	2	–	–	2
11	Aleksandr Kurlovich	Soviet Union; Unified Team	M	+110 kg	1988	1992	2	–	–	2
11	Long Qingquan	China	M	56 kg	2008	2016	2	–	–	2
11	Norair Nurikyan	Bulgaria	M	56 kg / 60 kg	1972	1976	2	–	–	2
11	Hossein Rezazadeh	Iran	M	+105 kg	2000	2004	2	–	–	2
11	**Shi Zhiyong**	China	M	69 kg / 73 kg	2016	2020	2	–	–	2
11	Charles Vinci	United States	M	56 kg	1956	1960	2	–	–	2
11	Leonid Zhabotinsky	Soviet Union	M	+90 kg	1964	1968	2	–	–	2
11	Zhan Xugang	China	M	70 kg / 77 kg	1996	2000	2	–	–	2
11	Rim Jong-Sim	Democratic People's Republic of Korea	F	69 kg / 75 kg	2012	2016	2	–	–	2
11	**Li Wenwen**	China	F	81+ kg / 87+ kg	2020	2024	2	–	–	2
11	**Hou Zhihui**	China	F	49 kg	2020	2024	2	–	–	2
11	**Li Fabin**	China	M	61 kg	2020	2024	2	–	–	2

== See also ==
- List of Olympic medalists in weightlifting
- List of Olympic records in weightlifting
- List of Olympic venues in weightlifting
- World Weightlifting Championships
- Powerlifting at the Summer Paralympics
- Weightlifting at the 1906 Intercalated Games
