= Conrad Magnusson =

American tug of war competitor

Medal record

Men's tug of war

Representing the United States

Olympic Games
Gold medal – first place	1904 St. Louis	Team competition

Conrad Magnusson (August 18, 1874 – September 14, 1924) was an American tug of war athlete who competed in the 1904 Summer Olympics. In the 1904 Olympics, he won a gold medal as a member of the Milwaukee Athletic Club team.
