= Frederick Winters =

American weightlifter (1873–1915)

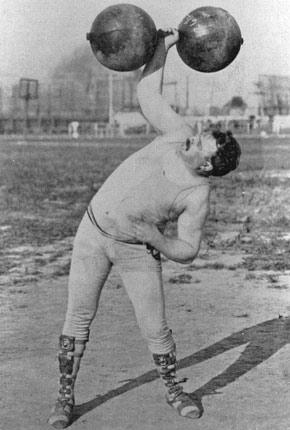
- Frederick Winters during 1904 Summer Olympics

Medal record

Men's weightlifting

Representing the United States

Olympic Games
Silver medal – second place	1904 St. Louis	Dumbbell contest

Frederick Winters (7 January 1873 – 26 April 1915) was an American weightlifter and Olympic medalist. He won a silver medal at the 1904 Summer Olympics in St. Louis.
