= CBC Sports =

Sports broadcasts by the Canadian Broadcasting Corporation

- Type: Division
- Industry: Broadcasting
- Genre: Sports
- Founded: 1931; 95 years ago
- Headquarters: Canadian Broadcasting Centre, Toronto, Ontario
- Key people: Chris Wilson (Executive Director)
- Services: Hockey Night in Canada; Olympics; IAAF Golden League; Grand Slam of Curling; CHL on CBC
- Owner: Canadian Broadcasting Corporation
- Website: cbcsports.ca

CBC Sports is the division of the Canadian Broadcasting Corporation responsible for English-language sports broadcasting. The CBC's sports programming primarily airs on CBC Television, CBCSports.ca, and CBC Radio One. (The CBC's French-language Radio-Canada network also produces sports programming.)

Once the country's dominant sports broadcaster, in recent years it has lost many of its past signature properties – such as the Canadian Football League, Toronto Blue Jays baseball, Canadian Curling Association championships, the Olympic Games for a period, the FIFA World Cup, and the National Hockey League – to the cable specialty channels TSN and Sportsnet. The CBC maintained partial rights to the NHL through 2026 as part of a sub-licensing agreement with current rightsholder Rogers Sports & Media (maintaining the Saturday-night Hockey Night in Canada and playoff coverage), although this coverage was produced by Sportsnet, as opposed to the CBC itself as was the case in the past.

As a result of funding reductions from the federal government, increased costs for licensing, and decreased revenues, in April 2014, the CBC announced it would no longer bid for professional sports broadcasting rights. The CBC has since used its digital platforms to provide overflow coverage of events not on television, and simulcasts of television coverage. Since then, the CBC's in-house sports coverage has been largely focused on Olympic sports, other domestic amateur and semi-professional competitions.

The majority of CBC Television's sports coverage is broadcast on weekend afternoons, under the blanket title CBC Sports Presents (formerly Road to the Olympic Games from 2015 to 2022, and CBC Sports Weekend prior to 2015). In October 2026, CBC introduced CBC Sports Primetime as a regular Saturday-night window for sports broadcasts, replacing Hockey Night in Canada after Rogers withdrew its sublicensing agreement.

CBC Sports also streams all of its programming, as well as other event coverage not shown on television, via its website and digital platforms (including the CBC Sports app and CBC Gem).

Former CEO of Curling Canada Greg Stremlaw was the head of CBC Sports from April 10, 2015 to January 2019.

== Sports properties ==
=== Current ===
Alpine Skiing

- FIS World Cup races

Athletics

- Diamond League
- World Athletics Championships
- U Sports Athletics

Baseball

- Little League Canadian Championships

Basketball

- Canadian Elite Basketball League (2026–)
- FIBA 3x3 World Cup (2012–present)

Cricket

- Canada Super60 (2026–)

Curling

- Grand Slam of Curling (2026–)
- Rock League

Figure Skating

- World Figure Skating Championships
- International Skating Union (excluding domestic events (rights owned by TSN))
- Skate Canada International
- Canadian Figure Skating Championships

Gridiron Football

- Vanier Cup (beginning with the 55th (2019) edition)
- U Sports Football

Hockey

- Professional Women's Hockey League - Hockey Night in Canada (2023–present).
  - Produced in-house by the league.
  - Weekly Saturday afternoon game of the week on CBC Television and starting December 2026, eight Saturday night games run under the Hockey Night in Canada banner
  - Additional streaming games.
- Canadian Hockey League (2021–present)
  - Early-season weekend games across its constituent leagues.
  - Additional streaming regular-season games.
- U Sports Hockey

Multi-sports competitions

- 2027 Pan American Games
- 2028 Summer Olympics

Soccer

- Northern Super League (2025–present)
- U Sports men's soccer championship

Volleyball

- U Sports volleyball

=== Previous ===
Canoe Sprint

- 2009 ICF Canoe Sprint World Championships

Curling

- Cross Canada Curling (1961–1965)
- CBC Championship Curling (1966–1972)
- CBC Curling Classic (1973–1979)
- Canadian Curling Association (1961–2008)
- Grand Slam of Curling (weekend coverage of selected events)

Baseball

- Major League Baseball
  - Major League Baseball on CBC (1953–2008)
    - Toronto Blue Jays (1977–1980, 1992–2002, 2007–2008)
    - Montreal Expos (1969–1989)
    - All-Star Game/Postseason/World Series (1969–1996)

Basketball

- National Basketball Association
  - NBA on CBC (2007–2010)
    - Toronto Raptors (2007–2010)
- Canadian Elite Basketball League
  - All games streaming (2019–2022), 7 regular-season games and the championship game on CBC Television (2020–2022)

Cricket

- Global T20 Canada (2023–2024)
  - All matches streaming (championship match on CBC Television)

Equine sports

- Calgary Stampede
- Spruce Meadows

Gridiron Football

- Canadian Football League (CFL on CBC) - (1952–2007)

Hockey

- AHL on CBC – 10 games during the 2010–11 season
- National Hockey League - Hockey Night in Canada (1952–2026)
  - Produced by Sportsnet (Rogers Sports & Media) from the 2014–15 season under a sub-licensing deal.
  - Weekly Saturday night doubleheader and at least one playoff game each night a playoff game is played.

Horse racing

- Queen's Plate

Multi-sports competitions

- Olympics on CBC
  - Summer Olympics - 1956–1988, 1996–2008, 2016–2024
  - Summer Paralympics - 2004, 2008, 2016, 2020
  - Winter Olympics - 1956–2006, 2014, 2018, 2022, 2026
  - Winter Paralympics
  - Youth Olympics
- Commonwealth Games
- 1999 Pan American Games - (sublicenced to TSN)
- 2015 Pan American Games/2015 Parapan American Games - (soccer sublicensed to Sportsnet)
- 2019 Pan American Games/2019 Parapan American Games (streaming only)
- 2023 Pan American Games/2023 Parapan American Games (streaming only)
- 2017 North American Indigenous Games

Rugby

- Toronto Wolfpack

Soccer

- Canadian Premier League – 20 games (10 streaming only).
- U Sports men's soccer championship
- Major League Soccer - Toronto FC and MLS Cup (2007–2010)
- 2007 FIFA U-20 World Cup
- FIFA World Cup (1954–2014)
- CONCACAF Canadian Championship (2008) - Most games show live on bold, then on tape delay on CBC.

Tennis

- Canadian Open (Semi-finals and finals through 2015)

== Notable personalities (past and present) ==
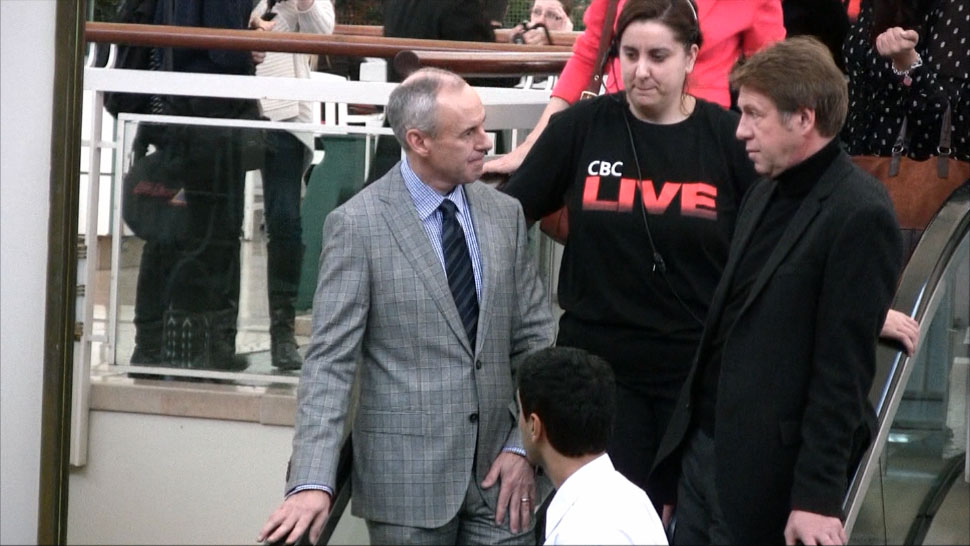
Ron MacLean and Scott Russell talk on an escalator at Sherway Gardens.

- Ernie Afaganis
- Steve Armitage
- David Archer
- John Badham
- Anastasia Bucsis
- Leo Cahill
- Cassie Campbell-Pascall
- Don Chevrier
- Don Cherry
- Bob Cole
- Ward Cornell
- James Curry
- Chris Cuthbert
- Keith Dancy
- John Davidson
- Jason de Vos
- Gary Dornhoefer
- Steve Douglas
- Don Duguid
- Terry Evanshen
- Darren Flutie
- Greg Frers
- Elliotte Friedman
- Joe Galat
- Danny Gallivan
- Bob Goldham
- Tom Harrington
- Mike Harris
- Foster Hewitt
- Bill Hewitt
- Kelly Hrudey
- Dave Hodge
- Jim Hughson
- Dick Irvin Jr.
- Brenda Irving
- Russ Jackson
- Colleen Jones
- Khari Jones
- Dan Kelly
- Danny Kepley
- Ron Lancaster
- Karin Larsen
- Mark Lee
- Ron MacLean
- Jeff Marek
- Norm Marshall
- Doug Maxwell
- Joan McCusker
- Brian McFarlane
- Wes McKnight
- Mike Milbury
- Greg Millen
- Gord Miller
- Sean Millington
- Howie Meeker
- Bob Moir
- Harry Neale
- Scott Oake
- Mitch Peacock
- Andi Petrillo
- Bruce Rainnie
- Mickey Redmond
- Chico Resch
- Ted Reynolds
- Frank Rigney
- Jim Robson
- Paul Romanuk
- Scott Russell
- Sandra Schmirler
- Craig Simpson
- Rob Snoek
- P.J. Stock
- Glen Suitor
- Eric Tillman
- Alex Trebek
- Chris Walby
- Jack Wells
- John Wells
- Brian Williams
- Don Wittman

== Directors ==
- Len Casey (1965–1967)
- Ron Hunka (1967–1970)
- Don Goodwin (1970–1975)
- Gordon Craig (1975–1977)
- John Hudson (1977–1980)
- Ron Devion (1980–1982)
- Denis Harvey (1982–1983)
- Don MacPherson (1984–1988)
- Arthur Smith (1988–1990)
- Alan Clark (1990 – December 8, 1999)
- Nancy Lee (December 9, 1999 – February 28, 2007)
- Scott Moore (March 1, 2007 – April 3, 2011)
- Jeffrey Orridge (April 4, 2011 – April 9, 2015)
- Greg Stremlaw (April 10, 2015 – January, 2019)
- Chris Wilson (July 2, 2019 – present)

== Hall of Fame ==
CBC Sports Hall of Fame recognizes those broadcasters of CBC Sports who have made a unique and lasting contribution to CBC and to the sports broadcasting industry.

- Ernie Afaganis
- Don E. Brown
- Alan Clark
- Gordon Craig
- Margaret Davis
- Tom Fisk
- Danny Gallivan
- Geoff Gowan
- Foster Hewitt
- Dick Irvin Jr.
- Terry Leibel
- Joan Mead
- Howie Meeker
- Bob Moir
- George Retzlaff
- Ted Reynolds
- Fred Sgambatti
- Jim Thompson
- Fred Walker
- Don Wittman

== Proposed CBC SportsPlus channel ==
In 2008, the CBC received CRTC approval for a sports specialty channel, "CBC SportsPlus", which would have aired a mix of amateur and professional sports. Commercial broadcasters, including CTVglobemedia, Rogers Media, and The Score filed petitons against the channel for being unduly competitive with existing sports channels (therefore violating the CRTC's then-policy of genre protection among specialty channels). They showed particular concern for the CBC stating that it planned to devote 75% of its programming to professional sports. The CRTC approved the license application, but restricted it to only devoting 30% of its schedule per-week to professional sports, with only 10% of this quota allowed to be devoted specifically to "professional stick and/or ball sports", which placed major restrictions on the network's intended remit, including hockey and lacrosse coverage. The restrictions effectively made the application and license non-viable, and paired with the CBC's budgetary restrictions, the network never commenced operations.
