= Curling on CBC =

Television coverage of curling in Canada

CBC Sports covered the sport of curling from 1962 to 2011. The CBC began its curling coverage with the 1962 Macdonald Brier. From 2007 to 2011, it covered the Capital One Grand Slam of Curling. Previously, CBC's broadcasting rights have included the Canadian Curling Association, the Tim Hortons Brier, the CBC Curling Classic, the World Curling Championships, and Olympic Curling.

== Current broadcasts ==
=== Capital One Grand Slam of Curling on CBC ===
Capital One Grand Slam of Curling on CBC is a presentation of the Capital One Grand Slam of Curling aired on the CBC Television network from 2007 to 2011 and will air again in 2012. CTV/Rogers Sportsnet had previously aired the Grand Slam since its inception in 2001. Bruce Rainnie serves as the play-by-play announcer, Mike Harris and Joan McCusker are the colour commentators, and Scott Russell serves as a reporter. CBC airs the finals on the main network and the semi- and quarterfinals previously aired on Bold. All matches are simulcasted on CBCSports.ca. Due to a dispute with Grand Slam management group iSports Media, the CBC pulled its Grand Slam coverage in January 2012 just before the 2012 The National event. On August 30, 2012, CBC Sports announced that they would air the 2012-13 Grand Slam of Curling in partnership with Sportsnet.

== Former broadcasts ==
=== Cross Canada Curling ===
Cross Canada Curling was a series presented on CBC's World of Sport from 1961-1965. Cross Canada Curling featured teams from each of the eleven provincial and territorial curling rinks. The four western rinks played off in Winnipeg and the seven eastern rinks played off in Toronto and Halifax. The eastern and western champions would play each other in the final program. Doug Maxwell called the matches from Toronto, Keith Barry called the matches from Halifax, and Don Wittman called the matches from Winnipeg as well as the championship game.

=== CBC Championship Curling/CBC Curling Classic ===
From 1966-1979, CBC sponsored its own bonspiel known as the CBC Championship Curling from 1966–1972 and the CBC Curling Classic from 1973-1979. The announcers for this event were Alex Trebek (1966–1970), Don Chevrier (1969–1979), Ken Watson (1966), Johnny Wayne (1968), Doug Maxwell (1968–1978), Don Duguid (1971–1979), and Don Wittman (1978–1979).

=== CCA on CBC ===
The CBC broadcast Canadian Curling Association matches, including the Tim Hortons Brier and the Scotties Tournament of Hearts, from 1966-2008. CBC was the sole holder of broadcasting rights from 1962–1983 and shared rights with TSN from 1984-2003. During this period, TSN covered most weekday matches, and CBC came in for the semifinals and finals on the weekend.

In 2004, the CCA and CBC agreed to a four-year deal which gave CBC exclusive rights to all CCA tournaments, including the Brier. The corporation chose to use CBC Country Canada, a digital cable channel available in far fewer households than CBC or TSN, to broadcast most weekday matches. To add insult to injury (from the perspective of many curling fans), the time limits on sports coverage that the channel had at that time meant that Country Canada had to end coverage at the end of its scheduled coverage window, even if matches were still ongoing. This resulted in criticism from curling fans, sponsors, and ultimately the CCA itself, which claimed the CBC was in breach of contract and unilaterally ended the agreement after one season. The CBC threatened legal action, but ultimately agreed to once again divide rights with TSN from 2005 to 2007.

In 2006, the CCA and TSN signed an exclusive six-year contract which would take effect in 2008, ending CBC's 42-year relationship with the CCA.

Announcers for CBC's coverage of the CCA included Don Wittman, Don Chevrier, Doug Maxwell, Mark Lee, Don Duguid, Colleen Jones, Sandra Schmirler, Mike Harris, Joan McCusker, and Bruce Rainnie.

=== Olympic Curling ===
CBC aired Olympic curling as part of its Olympic coverage in 1998, 2002, 2006, 2014, 2018, and 2022. The announcers for Olympic curling were Don Wittman (1998, 2002 & 2006), Don Duguid (1998), Joan McCusker (2002, 2006, 2014 and 2018), Mike Harris (2002, 2006, 2014, 2018, and 2022), Bruce Rainnie (2006 as sideline reporter & 2014, 2018, and as main commentator), and Joanne Courtney (2022).
