= Bob Moir =

Canadian television producer, sports commentator, and journalist (1929–2016)

- Born: 1929; Winnipeg, Manitoba, Canada
- Died: December 18, 2016 (aged 87); Toronto, Ontario, Canada
- Occupations: Television producer, sports commentator, journalist
- Known for: CBC Sports; Winnipeg Free Press
- Awards: Canadian Football Hall of Fame; CBC Sports Hall of Fame

Robert Munro Moir (1929 – December 18, 2016) was a Canadian television producer, sports commentator, and journalist. He covered the Canadian Football League for the Winnipeg Free Press from 1948 to 1958, then worked more than 40 years for the Canadian Broadcasting Corporation (CBC) beginning in 1952. He was a play-by-play commentator for football games broadcast on CBC Sports from 1957 to 1963, and was the first secretary-treasurer of Football Reporters of Canada. He reported for CBC Sports at the 1972 Summer Olympics, and sneaked into the Olympic Village during the Munich massacre to give live reports. As the executive producer for coverage of the 1976 Summer Olympics, he expanded coverage by CBC Sports from 14 to 169 hours, introduced live interviews with athletes after events, and established the model used for future coverage of the Olympics. His later work for CBC Sports included the executive-producer of Canadian Football League broadcasts, the Commonwealth Games, the Summer and Winter Olympics, and the World Figure Skating Championships. He was inducted into the Canadian Football Hall of Fame and the CBC Sports Hall of Fame, and was named to the Manitoba Sportswriters and Sportscasters Association roll of honour.

== Early life ==
Robert Munro Moir was born in 1929, in Winnipeg, Manitoba.

Moir was a sports journalist for the Winnipeg Free Press from 1948 to 1958, covering the Canadian Football League. He joined the Canadian Broadcasting Corporation (CBC) in 1952, was a play-by-play commentator for football games broadcast on CBC Sports from 1957 to 1963, and called his first Grey Cup game in 1958. He was a founding member of Football Reporters of Canada, and served as its first secretary-treasurer. In 1962, he was the play-by-play commentator for the first Macdonald Brier of curling to be broadcast live on CBC Sports. He was later a commentator for the 1964 Summer Olympics, the first Olympics to be broadcast on CBC Sports.

== 1972 Summer Olympics ==
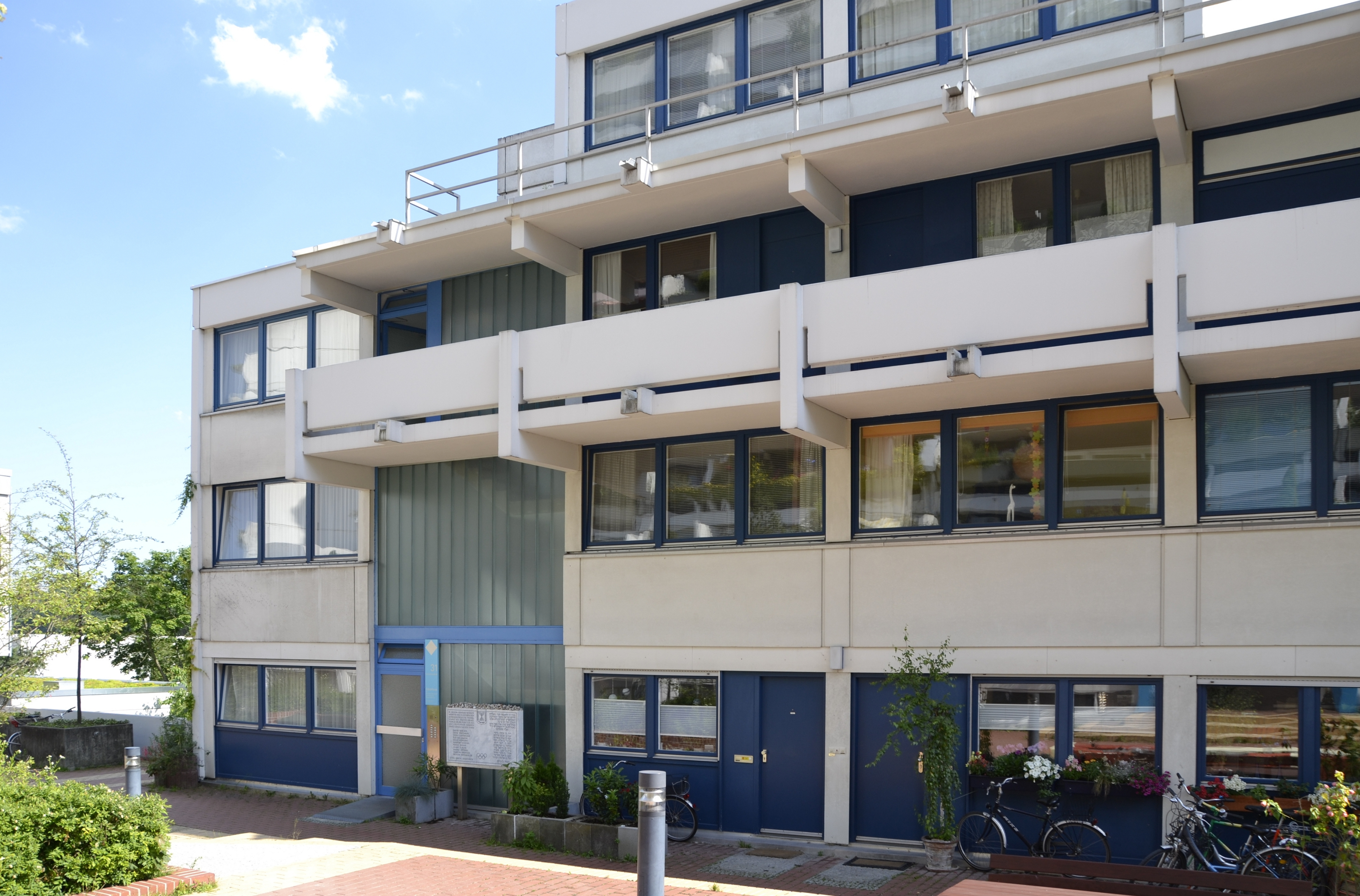
Israeli Olympic team's building in the Olympic Village

At the 1972 Summer Olympics hosted in Munich, Moir was a general assignment reporter for CBC Sports. During the Munich massacre crisis, he and Don Wittman crawled through a hole in a fence to access the Olympic Village and give live reports, while posing as medical staff on the 1972 Canadian Olympic team. He and Wittman were 50 metres (160 ft) away from the Israeli Olympic team building, and could see the nine hostages sitting in a circle, guarded by the Palestinian terrorist group Black September. He and Wittman filed radio reports to the CBC, and remained on location all day until the hostages were loaded onto a bus.

In a 1994 interview, Moir discussed the decision to sneak into the Olympic Village by saying,

"We were young and stupid, I guess. [Wittman] and I have always done things like that. We always went after the story."

== 1976 Summer Olympics ==
Moir was the executive producer for coverage of the 1976 Summer Olympics hosted in Montreal. He envisioned expanded coverage of the Olympics, despite criticism of CBC Sports for spending money from taxpayers to do so. He toured Canada to explain the project and boasted that, "the biggest team in Montreal will be the CBC team ... it will be bigger than the [1976] Canadian Olympic team". His crew for the English-language coverage of the Olympics included 245 people who produced 169 hours of content, compared to 14 hours of content at the 1972 Olympics.

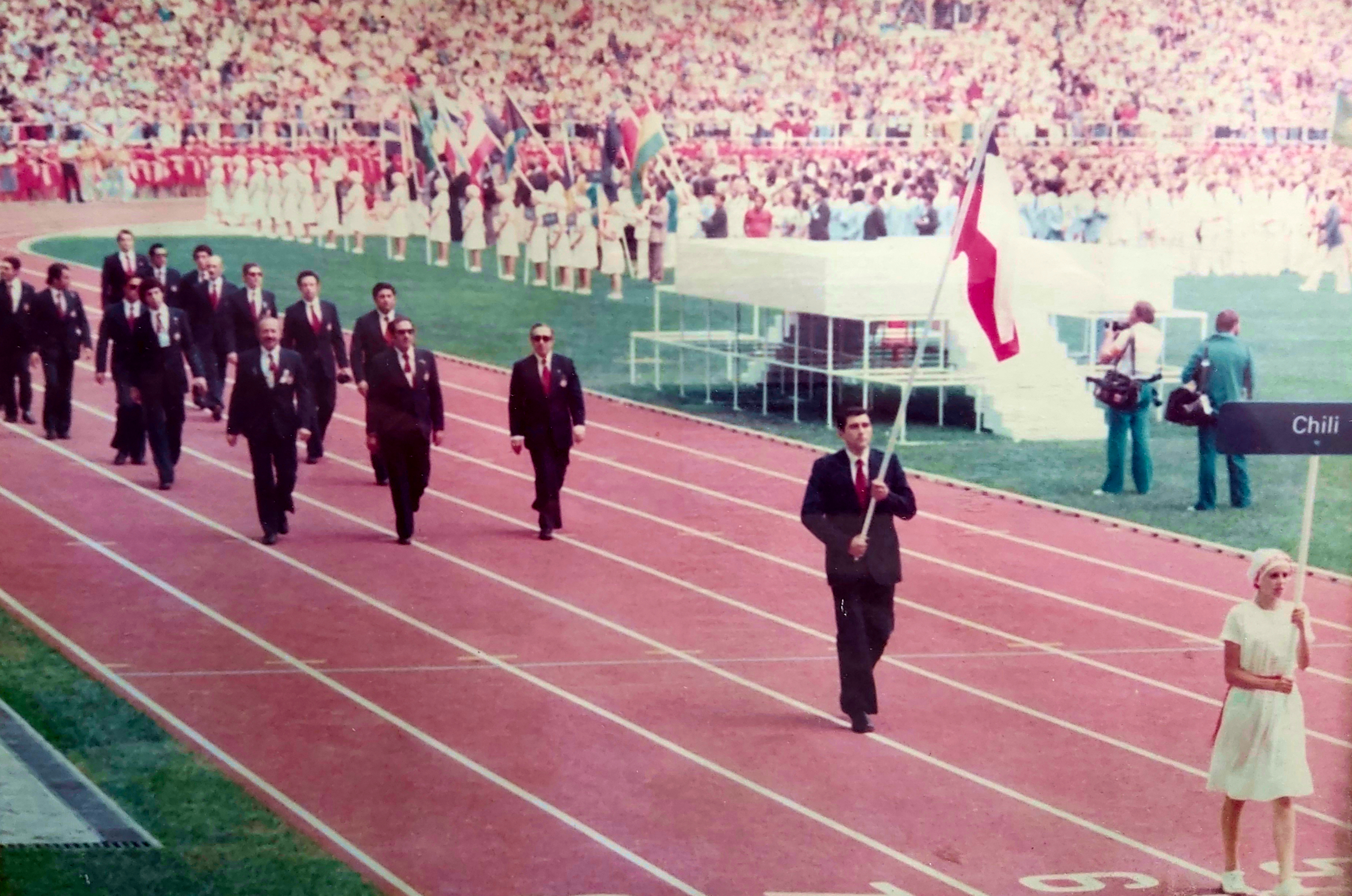
Opening ceremonies of the 1976 Summer Olympics

The 1976 Summer Olympics gave CBC Sports hosts their first chance to speak with athletes immediately following events, when Moir had a studio constructed for live televised interviews. When multiple events were held simultaneously, Moir had 20 videotape machines in use to record an event to air at a later time. When Poland played Russia for the gold medal in volleyball, Olympic coverage was extended to show the game to its conclusion, which delayed airing of The National news program by 35 minutes. During the Olympics, Moir had a telephone hotline to CBC director of operations Gordon Craig to discuss airtime, and later commented that he felt a "sense of power" when the news was delayed.

In reference to audience measurement ratings in Canada, Moir felt that "the Montreal Olympics was the impetus for what you see today". He also felt that the model used to cover the 1976 Summer Olympics set the standard used by CBC Sports for future live coverage of the Olympics, and stated that the CBC has not lost money covering an Olympics since 1976.

== Later career ==
Moir produced the physical fitness and sports education series Let's Do It, which aired 11 episodes during the summer of 1974. From 1976 to 1984, he was the producer or executive-producer of Canadian Football League games broadcast on CBC Sports.

In international events broadcast on CBC Sports, Moir was the producer of the 1986 Commonwealth Games, then the executive producer of the 1988 Summer Olympics and the 1992 Winter Olympics. As the executive producer of the 1994 Commonwealth Games, he won multiple Gemini Awards. He also served as executive producer of coverage for the 1994 World Figure Skating Championships, and the 1996 World Figure Skating Championships. When the International Skating Union began video recording programs by all skaters in 1996, Moir was a consultant on the project which aimed to increase the accuracy of the judging process.

Moir retired after working more than 40 years for the CBC. Broadcaster Scott Russell described Moir by saying, "he was always quick to recognize the good things you had done as a broadcaster", and that "he was a demanding person, exacting in terms of the standards he required". CBC Sports executive director Greg Stremlaw described Moir's career by stating, "over his more than 40 years with the network, Bob recruited and promoted many of the best-known commentators and analysts in Canadian broadcasting history and was an influential mentor to many production and technical staff".

== Personal life ==
Moir was married to Edmee, and had three daughters and one son. Moir died at age 87 on December 18, 2016, at Humber River Hospital in Toronto.

== Honours and awards ==
Moir was inducted into the Football Reporters of Canada section of the Canadian Football Hall of Fame in 1985, was named to the Manitoba Sportswriters and Sportscasters Association roll of honour in 1991, and was inducted into the CBC Sports Hall of Fame in 2008.
