= Alan Clark (television executive) =

Canadian television executive

- Born: 1949 (age 76–77); London, Ontario
- Education: Carleton University

Alan Clark is a Canadian television executive who served as the head of CBC Sports from 1990 to 1999.

== Early life ==
Clark was born in 1949 in London, Ontario and grew up in Ottawa. He graduated from Carleton University in 1974 with a degree in political science and history.

== Early career and CBC Radio ==
Clark got his start at the CBC as a copy boy in Ottawa. In the 1970s he worked in the network's national newsroom in Toronto. He later joined CBC Radio, where he worked as a producer, executive producer, news special host, and executive assistant to the program director. In 1983 he was named head of CBC Radio sports, which he established as a separate department from news.

== CBC Television ==
In November 1989, Clark was hired by Arthur Smith to serve as deputy head of CBC Sports. In January 1990, Clark was named acting head of CBC Sports after Smith accepted the position of executive producer and vice-president of Dick Clark Productions. Soon after taking over, the network announced budget cuts. As a result, Clark had to terminate three employees and, due to overtime costs, eliminate coverage of Canadian Football League games on holiday weekends. In April 1990, Clark was appointed head of CBC Sports.

During his tenure as head of CBC Sports, Clark successfully negotiated for the rights 2000, 2002, 2004, 2006, and 2008 Olympic Games, the National Hockey League, and the Canadian Football League. He was also a driving force behind Hockey Day in Canada.

On December 9, 1999, the CBC announced that Clark was stepping down as head of CBC sports to become the network's executive director of business development for sports. He was succeeded by his deputy Nancy Lee.

In 2010, Clark was elected to the CBC Sports Hall of Fame.
