= The Curling News =

- Editor-in-Chief: George Karrys
- Former editors: Ted Thonger; Larry Wood; Doug Maxwell
- Categories: Sports
- Founded: 1957
- Company: Roustan Media
- Country: Canada
- Based in: Toronto
- Language: English
- Website: www.thecurlingnews.com

The Curling News (TCN), formerly the Canadian Curling News is a publication dedicated to the sport of curling. Formerly a monthly print newspaper, it now publishes its articles on-line.

The Canadian Curling News was founded in 1957 by future Canadian Curling Hall of Fame inductee Ted Thonger in Calgary. The publication had 7,800 subscriptions by the end of its first season in print.

Former editors of the publication include Larry Wood, Doug Maxwell, and George Karrys.

Maxwell shut down the publication in 1994, but later brought it back. 1998 Olympic silver medallist George Karrys bought the publication in 2003, and re-branded it as The Curling News. Karrys served as Editor-In-Chief until 2019.

The Curling News was acquired by Roustan Media in 2019. The publication suspended its print operation during the COVID-19 pandemic in 2020. Later that year, it formed a partnership with Sports Illustrated, which lasted until 2024.
