= AHL on CBC =

Television broadcast of American Hockey League on CBC

The AHL on CBC was a television broadcast of American Hockey League games in Canada produced by CBC Sports and shown on CBC Television and CBC.ca, during 2010–11.

== 2010–11 season ==
During the 2010–11 AHL season, ten broadcasts of the AHL on CBC were produced as part of a one-year contract signed by the CBC and the AHL on Thursday, August 19, 2010. All games were aired at 1:00ET Sunday afternoon across Canada except the January 16 broadcast which aired at 2:00ET. All 10 games involved at least one AHL team that is affiliated with an NHL team based in Canada and all games took place in a Canadian city. The broadcasters for the AHL on CBC were Elliotte Friedman or Nabil Karim as the host, Bruce Rainnie or Dan Robertson as the play-by play announcer, and Brad May as the colour commentator.

Date	Result	Venue
Sunday, October 17	Binghamton 3 Toronto 1	Ricoh Coliseum, Toronto
Sunday, October 24	Oklahoma 3 Hamilton 2	Copps Coliseum, Hamilton, Ontario
Sunday, November 21	Hamilton 3 Toronto 1	Ricoh Coliseum, Toronto
Sunday, December 12	Hamilton 5 Toronto 1	Copps Coliseum, Hamilton, Ontario
Sunday, January 16	Toronto 3 Abbotsford 2 SO	Abbotsford Entertainment & Sports Centre, Abbotsford, British Columbia
Sunday, January 23	Manitoba 5 Abbotsford 3	MTS Centre, Winnipeg
Sunday, February 27	Manitoba 1 Toronto 0	Ricoh Coliseum, Toronto
Sunday, March 6	Hamilton 3 Toronto 2 OT	Ricoh Coliseum, Toronto
Sunday, March 27	Manitoba 2 Abbotsford 1	MTS Centre, Winnipeg
Sunday, April 3	Manitoba 3 Toronto 2	Ricoh Coliseum, Toronto

Date	Host	Play-by-Play	Colour Commentator
Sunday, October 17	Elliotte Friedman	Bruce Rainnie	Brad May
Sunday, October 24	Elliotte Friedman	Bruce Rainnie	Brad May
Sunday, November 21	Elliotte Friedman	Dan Robertson	Brad May
Sunday, December 12	Elliotte Friedman	Bruce Rainnie	Brad May
Sunday, January 16	Nabil Karim	Dan Robertson	Brad May
Sunday, January 23	Nabil Karim	Dan Robertson	Brad May
Sunday, February 27	Elliotte Friedman	Jeff Marek	Brad May
Sunday, March 6	Jeff Marek	Bruce Rainnie	Brad May
Sunday, March 27	Nabil Karim	Dan Robertson	Brad May
Sunday, April 3	Jeff Marek	Dan Robertson	Brad May

== 2011–12 season ==
Negotiations were underway for a second season of the AHL on CBC, but the negotiations fell through. The league instead aired on Rogers Sportsnet that season. Eventually, in 2014, CBC announced it would no longer bid for the AHL or any professional sports broadcasting rights.
