= 2017–18 NHL season =

National Hockey League season

- League: National Hockey League
- Sport: Ice hockey
- Duration: October 4, 2017 – June 7, 2018
- Games: 82
- Teams: 31
- TV partner(s): CBC, Sportsnet/SN1/SN360, Citytv, FX, TVA Sports (Canada); NBCSN, NBC, CNBC, USA (United States)

Draft
- Top draft pick: Nico Hischier
- Picked by: New Jersey Devils

Regular season
- Presidents' Trophy: Nashville Predators
- Season MVP: Taylor Hall (Devils)
- Top scorer: Connor McDavid (Oilers)

Playoffs
- Playoffs MVP: Alexander Ovechkin (Capitals)

Stanley Cup
- Champions: Washington Capitals
- Runners-up: Vegas Golden Knights

NHL seasons
- 2016–17 2018–19

The 2017–18 NHL season was the 101st season of operation (100th season of play) of the National Hockey League. With the addition of a new expansion team, the Vegas Golden Knights, 31 teams competed in an 82-game regular season. The regular season began on October 4, 2017, and ended on April 8, 2018. The 2018 Stanley Cup playoffs began on April 11, 2018, and concluded on June 7, with the Washington Capitals winning their first Stanley Cup in the Cup Final over the Vegas Golden Knights in five games.

== League business ==
=== Expansion ===
On June 22, 2016, the NHL confirmed that it had granted an expansion franchise in the city of Las Vegas to an ownership group led by Bill Foley, whose identity was revealed as the Vegas Golden Knights on November 22. The team plays in the Pacific Division of the Western Conference. In June 2017, the 2017 NHL expansion draft was held to fill out the Golden Knights roster.

=== Olympics abstention and ban ===
On April 3, 2017, the NHL announced that, after five Olympic tournaments in which the NHL allowed its players to participate in the event, it would not do so for the men's hockey tournament at the 2018 Winter Olympics in Pyeongchang, South Korea. Furthermore, the league did not include a break for the Olympics in its schedule, and scheduled its All-Star Game as usual for late-January shortly prior to the Olympics (historically, the All-Star Game was not played during Olympic years). Each team's mandatory bye week, stipulated in the league's CBA, was also scattered throughout the month of January.

The restriction will apply to any player under NHL contract, including those in its affiliated minor leagues, but not to players signed to one-way contracts directly with the teams in those minor leagues nor players signed to entry-level contracts who are playing junior ice hockey. Several players had vowed to participate anyway, most notably Alexander Ovechkin and Evgeni Malkin. They did not wind up participating. The league had initially stated that minor league prospects would not be subject to the ban. As the league had little legal room to enforce a ban itself without running afoul of the National Hockey League Players' Association, the league instead colluded with the International Ice Hockey Federation, who agreed to establish a blacklist forbidding the national teams from offering invitations to players under NHL contracts.

Players with Olympic aspirations who were free agents, especially those whose NHL prospects were marginal, were advised not to sign NHL contracts and, if they wished to play professionally, sign directly with minor league clubs to maintain Olympic eligibility. Former Buffalo Sabres captain Brian Gionta and former Olympian Jarome Iginla were among those who opted not to sign NHL contracts for the season prior to the Olympics; Iginla, because of a lingering injury, would not go to the Olympics.

=== Salary cap ===
On June 18, 2017, the National Hockey League Players' Association announced that the salary cap would be set at US$75 million per team for the 2017–18 season.

=== Rule changes ===
The NHL Board of Governors passed some new rules that take effect this season, including:

- coach's challenge of offside - the original rule was put in place after a series of highly blatant off-side calls had been missed. The rule soon became a huge time waster, often requested by coaches whose team had allowed a goal wanting a review of the exact millimeter that a skate and the puck pass the blue line. To reduce the number of coach's challenges, the league introduced a two-minute penalty for delay of game if a review does not overturn an offside.
- no timeouts after icing - as a team that causes an icing is not allowed to change the players on the ice, coaches took to calling their 30-second timeout to allow their players to rest, getting around the intent of the "no-changes" rule. This rule change eliminated that practice.
- touching high-sticked puck by power play team - previously, if a team on the man advantage played a puck after it was high-sticked, no matter where on the ice this happened, the play was stopped, and the faceoff came all the way back to their own zone. This was adjusted slightly so that, if the infraction happens in the short-handed team's zone, the faceoff would be moved back only to the neutral zone just outside the short-handed team's zone.

The Board of Governors also stated that existing rules be fully enforced in certain situations that had become "unofficially" ignored:

- enforcement of slashing rules - not a rule change as such, referees were newly expected to enforce the existing two-minute penalty for slashing when players chop at the wrists and hands of a puck carrier. This followed a series of injuries - including a partially chopped-off finger - for this common practice that was rarely being penalized.
- faceoff infractions - not a rule change as such, referees were newly expected to enforce the existing two-minute penalty for improper stance by a player taking a faceoff. This followed an extensive period where players were not standing with their feet properly placed within the limits of the markings by the dot, with their bodies square to the end boards.

=== Entry draft ===
The 2017 NHL entry draft was held on June 23–24, 2017, at the United Center in Chicago, Illinois. Nico Hischier was selected first overall by the New Jersey Devils.

=== Centennial celebration ===
The NHL's centennial commemorations continued into the 2017–18 season, as its 100th season of play. On March 17, 2017, the NHL announced the NHL 100 Classic outdoor game in Ottawa between the Ottawa Senators and Montreal Canadiens. Held on December 16, 2017, it marked the 100th anniversary of the first NHL games. The game was played on a temporary rink at the TD Place Stadium football stadium, accompanied by a fan festival at the Aberdeen Pavilion and an outdoor alumni game at Parliament Hill.

The Toronto Maple Leafs also marked the centennial of the NHL's first games (one of which involved their predecessor, the Toronto Arenas) with a "Next Century Game" on December 19, 2017, against the Carolina Hurricanes. The team wore special Toronto Arenas jerseys, and season ticket holders were encouraged to donate their tickets to the MLSE Foundation to allow students to attend this matinee game. Mayor of Toronto John Tory also declared December 19 "Toronto Maple Leafs Day".

=== Preseason games in China ===
On March 30, 2017, it was announced that the Los Angeles Kings and Vancouver Canucks would play two preseason games in China; on September 21 at Mercedes-Benz Arena in Shanghai and September 23 at the Beijing Wukesong Culture & Sports Center in Beijing. These were the first NHL games played in China.

== Coaching changes ==
Coaching changes
Off-season
Team	2016–17 coach	2017–18 coach	Story / accomplishments
Arizona Coyotes	Dave Tippett	Rick Tocchet	On June 22, 2017, through mutual agreement, Tippett left the head coach position of the Coyotes. He led the team to a 30–42–10 record during the 2016–17 season, and a 282–257–83 overall record in eight seasons with the team. The team made the playoffs three times, reaching the Western Conference Final in 2012. On July 11, 2017, Tocchet was named as the new head coach of the Coyotes. He was the assistant coach for the Pittsburgh Penguins in the last three seasons.
Buffalo Sabres	Dan Bylsma	Phil Housley	On April 20, 2017, the Sabres fired Bylsma after his team finished eighth in the Atlantic Division and failed to contend for the playoffs for the second consecutive season. He led the team to a 33–37–12 record during the 2016–17 season and a 68–73–23 overall record in two full seasons. On June 15, Housley was named the Sabres' new head coach. He had spent the previous four seasons as assistant coach for the Nashville Predators and previously played for the Sabres from 1982 to 1990.
Dallas Stars	Lindy Ruff	Ken Hitchcock	On April 9, 2017, the Stars announced that Ruff's contract would not be renewed for the 2017–18 season. Ruff led the team to a 34–37–11 record during the 2016–17 season as the Stars missed the playoffs and a 165–122–41 record since taking over in 2013. Ruff joined the New York Rangers as an assistant coach. On April 13, Hitchcock, most recently with the St. Louis Blues, was named the new head coach. He previously coached the Stars from 1996 to 2002.
Florida Panthers	Gerard Gallant; Tom Rowe*	Bob Boughner	Gallant, who compiled a record of 11–10–1 for the first part of the season (and a 96–65–25 record over his full 2¼-season tenure with the team, the highest win percentage of any coach in Panthers history), was fired on November 10, 2016. Rowe, the team's general manager, stepped into the position and compiled a 24–26–10 record. Gallant joined the Vegas Golden Knights, while Rowe, despite losing both the head coach and general manager titles, remained with the Panthers as an advisor. On June 12, Boughner was named the team's new head coach. He was the assistant coach of the San Jose Sharks before being hired by the Panthers.
Los Angeles Kings	Darryl Sutter	John Stevens	On April 10, 2017, the Kings fired Sutter after missing the playoffs for the second time in three years. He led the Kings to two Stanley Cup victories in 2012 and 2014. The Kings finished the season with a record of 39–35–8 and an overall record of 225–147–53 over six seasons with Sutter, which is the most wins for any coach in Kings' history. On April 23, Stevens was named the new head coach. He had been the Kings' assistant coach since 2010 and was also an interim coach for four games during the 2011–12 season.
Vancouver Canucks	Willie Desjardins	Travis Green	On April 10, 2017, the Canucks fired Desjardins after his team failed to contend for the playoffs for the second consecutive year. He led the team to a 30–43–9 record during the 2016–17 season and a 109–110–27 overall record in three full seasons. Desjardins will coach the Canadian Olympic team for this season. On April 26, Green was named the new head coach. Prior to his hiring, Green was the head coach for the Canucks' AHL affiliate Utica Comets.
Vegas Golden Knights	Expansion team	Gerard Gallant	On April 13, 2017, the Golden Knights hired Gerard Gallant, previously head coach of the Florida Panthers, as the team's first head coach.

This was the first NHL season since the 1966–67 season in which no coaching changes took place during the regular season.

== Arena changes ==
- The Detroit Red Wings moved to Little Caesars Arena, replacing their longtime home, the Joe Louis Arena.
- The Vegas Golden Knights played their inaugural season at T-Mobile Arena in Paradise, Nevada.
- The Washington Capitals' home arena was renamed from Verizon Center to Capital One Arena, as part of a new naming rights agreement with the bank Capital One.
- The Winnipeg Jets' home arena was renamed from MTS Centre to Bell MTS Place in observance of the BCE Inc. acquisition of Manitoba Telecom Services (MTS) earlier in the year.

== Regular season ==
The regular season began on October 4, 2017, and ended on April 8, 2018. Each team received a five-day "bye week", all of which took place in mid-January.

=== International games ===
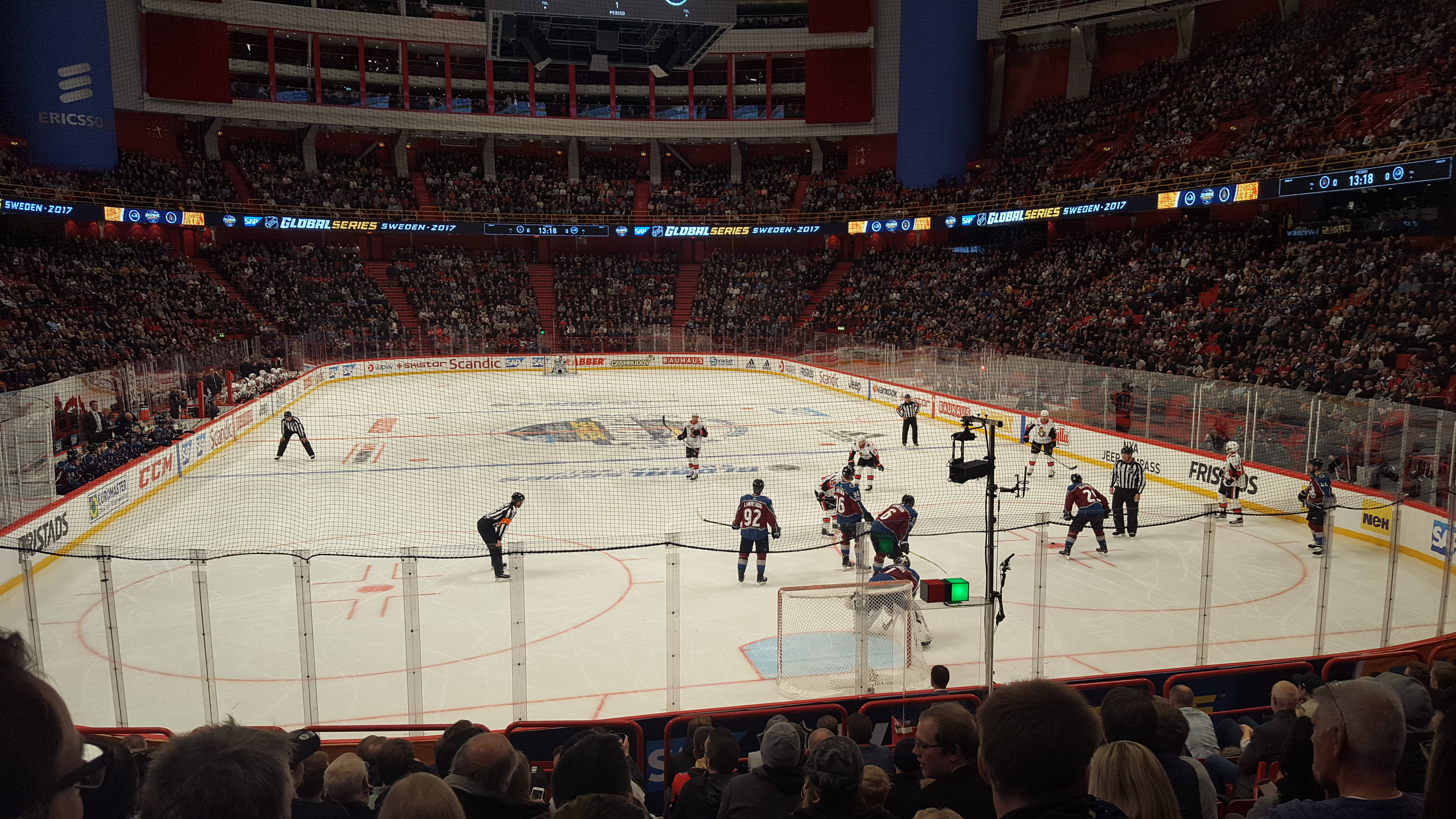
One of the games between the Ottawa Senators and the Colorado Avalanche at Ericsson Globe, Stockholm, Sweden

Two regular season games between the Colorado Avalanche and the Ottawa Senators were played at Ericsson Globe in Stockholm, Sweden on November 10 and 11, 2017, branded as the SAP NHL Global Series.

=== Outdoor games ===
- The NHL 100 Classic was held on December 16, 2017, at TD Place Stadium in Lansdowne Park, Ottawa, featuring the Montreal Canadiens against the Ottawa Senators.
- The Winter Classic was held on January 1, 2018, at Citi Field in Flushing, New York, with the New York Rangers playing the Buffalo Sabres.
- A Stadium Series game was held on March 3, 2018, at Navy–Marine Corps Memorial Stadium in Annapolis, Maryland, featuring two of last season's playoff teams, the Toronto Maple Leafs and the Washington Capitals.

=== All–Star Game ===
The 63rd National Hockey League All-Star Game was held in Tampa, Florida at Amalie Arena, home of the Tampa Bay Lightning, on January 28, 2018. The format did not change, and followed the format used in two previous All-Star games.

=== Postponed game ===
The Florida Panthers – Boston Bruins game scheduled for January 4, 2018, at TD Garden in Boston, Massachusetts, was postponed due to the effects of the January 2018 nor'easter. The game was rescheduled for April 8, the day after the regular season was originally scheduled to end.

== Standings ==
=== Eastern Conference ===
Top 3 (Metropolitan Division)
Pos	Team	GP	W	L	OTL	ROW	GF	GA	GD	Pts
1	y – Washington Capitals	82	49	26	7	46	259	239	+20	105
2	x – Pittsburgh Penguins	82	47	29	6	45	272	250	+22	100
3	x – Philadelphia Flyers	82	42	26	14	40	251	243	+8	98

Source: National Hockey League
x – Clinched playoff spot; y – Clinched division

Top 3 (Atlantic Division)
Pos	Team	GP	W	L	OTL	ROW	GF	GA	GD	Pts
1	z – Tampa Bay Lightning	82	54	23	5	48	296	236	+60	113
2	x – Boston Bruins	82	50	20	12	47	270	214	+56	112
3	x – Toronto Maple Leafs	82	49	26	7	42	277	232	+45	105

Source: National Hockey League
x – Clinched playoff spot; z – Clinched conference

Eastern Conference Wild Card
Pos	Div	Team	GP	W	L	OTL	ROW	GF	GA	GD	Pts
1	ME	x – Columbus Blue Jackets	82	45	30	7	39	242	230	+12	97
2	ME	x – New Jersey Devils	82	44	29	9	39	248	244	+4	97
3	AT	Florida Panthers	82	44	30	8	41	248	246	+2	96
4	ME	Carolina Hurricanes	82	36	35	11	33	228	256	−28	83
5	ME	New York Islanders	82	35	37	10	32	264	296	−32	80
6	ME	New York Rangers	82	34	39	9	31	231	268	−37	77
7	AT	Detroit Red Wings	82	30	39	13	25	217	255	−38	73
8	AT	Montreal Canadiens	82	29	40	13	27	209	264	−55	71
9	AT	Ottawa Senators	82	28	43	11	26	221	291	−70	67
10	AT	Buffalo Sabres	82	25	45	12	24	199	280	−81	62

Source: National Hockey League
x – Clinched playoff spot

=== Western Conference ===
Top 3 (Central Division)
Pos	Team	GP	W	L	OTL	ROW	GF	GA	GD	Pts
1	p – Nashville Predators	82	53	18	11	47	267	211	+56	117
2	x – Winnipeg Jets	82	52	20	10	48	277	218	+59	114
3	x – Minnesota Wild	82	45	26	11	42	253	232	+21	101

Source: National Hockey League
p – Clinched Presidents' Trophy; x – Clinched playoff spot

Top 3 (Pacific Division)
Pos	Team	GP	W	L	OTL	ROW	GF	GA	GD	Pts
1	y – Vegas Golden Knights	82	51	24	7	47	272	228	+44	109
2	x – Anaheim Ducks	82	44	25	13	40	235	216	+19	101
3	x – San Jose Sharks	82	45	27	10	40	252	229	+23	100

Source: National Hockey League
x – Clinched playoff spot; y – Clinched division

Western Conference Wild Card
Pos	Div	Team	GP	W	L	OTL	ROW	GF	GA	GD	Pts
1	PA	x – Los Angeles Kings	82	45	29	8	43	239	203	+36	98
2	CE	x – Colorado Avalanche	82	43	30	9	41	257	237	+20	95
3	CE	St. Louis Blues	82	44	32	6	41	226	222	+4	94
4	CE	Dallas Stars	82	42	32	8	38	235	225	+10	92
5	PA	Calgary Flames	82	37	35	10	35	218	248	−30	84
6	PA	Edmonton Oilers	82	36	40	6	31	234	263	−29	78
7	CE	Chicago Blackhawks	82	33	39	10	32	229	256	−27	76
8	PA	Vancouver Canucks	82	31	40	11	31	218	264	−46	73
9	PA	Arizona Coyotes	82	29	41	12	27	208	256	−48	70

Source: National Hockey League
x – Clinched playoff spot

Tie Breakers:
1. Fewer number of games played.
2. Greater Regulation + OT Wins (ROW)
3. Greatest number of points earned in head-to-head play (If teams played an unequal # of head-to-head games, the result of the first game on the home ice of the team with the extra home game is discarded.)
4. Greater Goal differential

== Playoffs ==
=== Bracket ===
In each round, teams competed in a best-of-seven series following a 2–2–1–1–1 format (scores in the bracket indicate the number of games won in each best-of-seven series). The team with home ice advantage played at home for games one and two (and games five and seven, if necessary), and the other team was at home for games three and four (and game six, if necessary). The top three teams in each division made the playoffs, along with two wild cards in each conference, for a total of eight teams from each conference.

In the First Round, the lower seeded wild card in the conference played against the division winner with the best record while the other wild card played against the other division winner, and both wild cards were de facto #4 seeds. The other series matched the second and third place teams from the divisions. In the first two rounds, home ice advantage was awarded to the team with the better seed. Thereafter, it was awarded to the team that had the better regular season record.

First round	Second round
A1	Tampa Bay	4
WC2	New Jersey	1
A1	Tampa Bay	4
A2	Boston	1
A2	Boston	4
A3	Toronto	3
Eastern Conference
M1	Washington	4
WC1	Columbus	2
M1	Washington	4
M2	Pittsburgh	2
M2	Pittsburgh	4
M3	Philadelphia	2
C1	Nashville	4
WC2	Colorado	2
C1	Nashville	3
C2	Winnipeg	4
C2	Winnipeg	4
C3	Minnesota	1
Western Conference
P1	Vegas	4
WC1	Los Angeles	0
P1	Vegas	4
P3	San Jose	2
P2	Anaheim	0
P3	San Jose	4

Conference finals
A1	Tampa Bay	3
M1	Washington	4
C2	Winnipeg	1
P1	Vegas	4

Stanley Cup Final
M1	Washington	4
P1	Vegas	1

== Statistics ==
=== Scoring leaders ===
The following players led the league in regular season points at the conclusion of games played on April 7, 2018.

Player	Team	GP	G	A	Pts	+/–	PIM
Connor McDavid	Edmonton Oilers	82	41	67	108	+20	26
Claude Giroux	Philadelphia Flyers	82	34	68	102	+28	20
Nikita Kucherov	Tampa Bay Lightning	80	39	61	100	+15	42
Evgeni Malkin	Pittsburgh Penguins	78	42	56	98	+16	87
Nathan MacKinnon	Colorado Avalanche	74	39	58	97	+11	55
Taylor Hall	New Jersey Devils	76	39	54	93	+14	34
Anze Kopitar	Los Angeles Kings	82	35	57	92	+21	20
Phil Kessel	Pittsburgh Penguins	82	34	58	92	–4	36
Blake Wheeler	Winnipeg Jets	81	23	68	91	+13	52
Sidney Crosby	Pittsburgh Penguins	82	29	60	89	0	46

=== Leading goaltenders ===
The following goaltenders led the league in regular season goals against average at the conclusion of games played on April 8, 2018, while playing at least 1,800 minutes.

Player	Team	GP	TOI	W	L	OTL	GA	SO	SV%	GAA
Antti Raanta	Arizona Coyotes	47	2599:07	21	17	6	97	3	.930	2.24
Marc-Andre Fleury	Vegas Golden Knights	46	2673:24	29	13	4	100	4	.927	2.24
Pekka Rinne	Nashville Predators	59	3475:27	42	13	4	134	8	.927	2.31
Philipp Grubauer	Washington Capitals	35	1864:48	15	10	3	73	3	.923	2.35
Connor Hellebuyck	Winnipeg Jets	67	3965:54	44	11	9	156	6	.924	2.36
Tuukka Rask	Boston Bruins	54	3173:05	34	14	5	125	3	.917	2.36
Jonathan Quick	Los Angeles Kings	64	3677:05	33	28	3	147	5	.921	2.40
Sergei Bobrovsky	Columbus Blue Jackets	65	3911:34	37	22	6	158	5	.921	2.42
John Gibson	Anaheim Ducks	60	3428:29	31	18	7	139	4	.926	2.43
Roberto Luongo	Florida Panthers	35	1965:58	18	11	2	81	3	.929	2.47

== NHL awards ==
The league's awards were presented at the NHL Awards ceremony, that was held following the 2018 Stanley Cup playoffs on June 20 at the Las Vegas Hard Rock Hotel and Casino. Finalists for voted awards were announced during the playoffs and winners were presented at the award ceremony. Voting concluded immediately after the end of the regular season. The Presidents' Trophy, the Prince of Wales Trophy and Clarence S. Campbell Bowl are not presented at the awards ceremony. For the first time, the Professional Hockey Writers' Association voted to release each voters' ballot to the public after the awards ceremony.

2017–18 NHL awards
Award	Recipient(s)	Runner(s)-up/finalists
Presidents' Trophy (Best regular season record)	Nashville Predators	Winnipeg Jets
Prince of Wales Trophy (Eastern Conference playoff champion)	Washington Capitals	Tampa Bay Lightning
Clarence S. Campbell Bowl (Western Conference playoff champion)	Vegas Golden Knights	Winnipeg Jets
Art Ross Trophy (Player with most points)	Connor McDavid (Edmonton Oilers)	Claude Giroux (Philadelphia Flyers)
Bill Masterton Memorial Trophy (Perseverance, Sportsmanship, and Dedication)	Brian Boyle (New Jersey Devils)	Roberto Luongo (Florida Panthers); Jordan Staal (Carolina Hurricanes)
Calder Memorial Trophy (Best first-year player)	Mathew Barzal (New York Islanders)	Brock Boeser (Vancouver Canucks); Clayton Keller (Arizona Coyotes)
Conn Smythe Trophy (Most valuable player, playoffs)	Alexander Ovechkin (Washington Capitals)	Evgeny Kuznetsov (Washington Capitals)
Frank J. Selke Trophy (Defensive forward)	Anze Kopitar (Los Angeles Kings)	Patrice Bergeron (Boston Bruins); Sean Couturier (Philadelphia Flyers)
Hart Memorial Trophy (Most valuable player, regular season)	Taylor Hall (New Jersey Devils)	Anze Kopitar (Los Angeles Kings); Nathan MacKinnon (Colorado Avalanche)
Jack Adams Award (Best coach)	Gerard Gallant (Vegas Golden Knights)	Jared Bednar (Colorado Avalanche); Bruce Cassidy (Boston Bruins)
James Norris Memorial Trophy (Best defenceman)	Victor Hedman (Tampa Bay Lightning)	Drew Doughty (Los Angeles Kings); P. K. Subban (Nashville Predators)
King Clancy Memorial Trophy (Leadership and humanitarian contribution)	Daniel and Henrik Sedin (Vancouver Canucks)	P. K. Subban (Nashville Predators); Jason Zucker (Minnesota Wild)
Lady Byng Memorial Trophy (Sportsmanship and excellence)	William Karlsson (Vegas Golden Knights)	Aleksander Barkov (Florida Panthers); Ryan O'Reilly (Buffalo Sabres)
Ted Lindsay Award (Outstanding player)	Connor McDavid (Edmonton Oilers)	Taylor Hall (New Jersey Devils); Nathan MacKinnon (Colorado Avalanche)
Mark Messier Leadership Award (Leadership and community activities)	Deryk Engelland (Vegas Golden Knights)	Wayne Simmonds (Philadelphia Flyers); Blake Wheeler (Winnipeg Jets)
Maurice "Rocket" Richard Trophy (Top goal-scorer)	Alexander Ovechkin (Washington Capitals)	Patrik Laine (Winnipeg Jets)
NHL General Manager of the Year Award (Top general manager)	George McPhee (Vegas Golden Knights)	Kevin Cheveldayoff (Winnipeg Jets); Steve Yzerman (Tampa Bay Lightning)
Vezina Trophy (Best goaltender)	Pekka Rinne (Nashville Predators)	Connor Hellebuyck (Winnipeg Jets); Andrei Vasilevskiy (Tampa Bay Lightning)
William M. Jennings Trophy (Goaltender(s) of team with fewest goals against)	Jonathan Quick (Los Angeles Kings)	Pekka Rinne and Juuse Saros (Nashville Predators)

=== All-Star teams ===
Position	First Team	Second Team	Position	All-Rookie
G	Pekka Rinne, Nashville Predators	Connor Hellebuyck, Winnipeg Jets	G	Juuse Saros, Nashville Predators
D	Drew Doughty, Los Angeles Kings	Seth Jones, Columbus Blue Jackets	D	Will Butcher, New Jersey Devils
D	Victor Hedman, Tampa Bay Lightning	P. K. Subban, Nashville Predators	D	Charlie McAvoy, Boston Bruins
C	Connor McDavid, Edmonton Oilers	Nathan MacKinnon, Colorado Avalanche	F	Mathew Barzal, New York Islanders
RW	Nikita Kucherov, Tampa Bay Lightning	Blake Wheeler, Winnipeg Jets	F	Brock Boeser, Vancouver Canucks
LW	Taylor Hall, New Jersey Devils	Claude Giroux, Philadelphia Flyers	F	Clayton Keller, Arizona Coyotes

== Milestones ==
=== First games ===
The following is a list of notable players who played their first NHL game during the 2017–18 season, listed with their first team.

Player	Team	Notability
Thatcher Demko	Vancouver Canucks	One-time NHL All-Star team selection
Scott Foster	Chicago Blackhawks	Recreational goaltender who received playing time
Nico Hischier	New Jersey Devils	First overall pick in the 2017 draft, one-time NHL All-Star
Oskar Lindblom	Philadelphia Flyers	Bill Masterton Memorial Trophy winner
Charlie McAvoy	Boston Bruins	One-time NHL All-Star team selection, NHL All-Rookie Team selection
Nathan Walker	Washington Capitals	First Australian to play in the NHL

=== Last games ===
The following is a list of players of note who played their last NHL game in 2017–18, listed with their team:

Player	Team	Notability
Mike Fisher	Nashville Predators	Over 1,100 games played
Marián Gáborík	Ottawa Senators	Three-time NHL All-Star, one-time NHL All-Star team, over 1,000 games played
Brian Gionta	Boston Bruins	Over 1,000 games played
Scott Hartnell	Nashville Predators	Over 1,200 games played
Jaromír Jágr	Calgary Flames	Over 1,700 games played, second all-time in points (1,921), Hart Memorial Trophy winner, three-time Lester B. Pearson Award winner, five-time Art Ross Trophy winner, Bill Masterton Memorial Trophy winner, eight-time NHL All-Star Team selection, 13-time NHL All-Star, NHL All-Rookie Team selection, 100 Greatest NHL Players, member of the Triple Gold Club
Rick Nash	Boston Bruins	Maurice "Rocket" Richard Trophy winner, NHL Foundation Player Award winner, over 1,000 games played, six-time NHL All-Star
Daniel Sedin	Vancouver Canucks	Art Ross Trophy winner, Ted Lindsay Award winner, King Clancy Memorial Trophy winner, over 1,300 games played, two-time NHL All-Star team selection, three-time NHL All-Star
Henrik Sedin	Vancouver Canucks	Art Ross Trophy winner, Hart Memorial Trophy winner, King Clancy Memorial Trophy winner, over 1,300 games played, two-time NHL All-Star team selection, three-time NHL All-Star
Patrick Sharp	Chicago Blackhawks	Over 1,000 games played
Matt Stajan	Calgary Flames	Over 1,000 games played
Antoine Vermette	Anaheim Ducks	Over 1,000 games played
Radim Vrbata	Florida Panthers	Over 1,000 games played
Henrik Zetterberg	Detroit Red Wings	Conn Smythe Trophy winner, King Clancy Memorial Trophy winner, NHL Foundation Player Award winner, NHL All-Star team selection, over 1,000 games played

=== Major milestones reached ===
- On October 18, 2017, Toronto Maple Leafs forward Patrick Marleau played his 1,500th NHL game, becoming the 18th player to do so.
- On October 26, 2017, New York Rangers forward Rick Nash played his 1,000th NHL game, becoming the 314th player to reach the mark.
- On November 2, 2017, San Jose Sharks forward Joe Thornton scored his 1,400th career point, becoming the 20th player in league history to reach this milestone.
- On November 4, 2017, Anaheim Ducks forward Andrew Cogliano played his 800th consecutive game, becoming the 4th player in league history to reach this milestone.
- On November 15, 2017, Anaheim Ducks forward Antoine Vermette played his 1,000th NHL game, becoming the 315th player to reach the mark.
- On November 30, 2017, Vancouver Canucks forward Daniel Sedin became the 87th player in league history to score 1,000 points.
- On December 12, 2017, Carolina Hurricanes goaltender Cam Ward recorded his 300th win, becoming the 32nd goaltender to reach the mark.
- On December 13, 2017, Dallas Stars goaltender Kari Lehtonen recorded his 300th win, becoming the 33rd goaltender to reach the mark.
- On December 15, 2017, Los Angeles Kings forward Marian Gaborik played his 1,000th NHL game, becoming the 316th player to reach the mark.
- On December 18, 2017, Edmonton Oilers forward Ryan Strome scored the 10,000th goal in Oilers history.
- On December 19, 2017, Toronto Maple Leafs forward James van Riemsdyk scored the 20,000th goal in Maple Leafs history.
- On December 21, 2017, Dallas Stars head coach Ken Hitchcock became the 3rd coach in league history to reach 800th wins.
- On December 21, 2017, Los Angeles Kings forward Dustin Brown played his 1,000th NHL game, becoming the 317th player to reach the mark and the 30th to play 1,000 games with one franchise.
- On December 30, 2017, Detroit Red Wings forward Frans Nielsen recorded his 47th shootout goal, making him the all-time leader in shootout goals.
- On January 16, 2018, New York Rangers goaltender Henrik Lundqvist became the first goaltender to win 20 games in 13 consecutive NHL seasons.
- On January 17, 2018, Dallas Stars head coach Ken Hitchcock became the fourth coach in league history to coach 1,500 games.
- On January 30, 2018, Dallas Stars defenceman Dan Hamhuis played his 1,000th NHL game, becoming the 318th player to reach the mark.
- On February 2, 2018, Minnesota Wild defenceman Ryan Suter recorded his 400th assist.
- On February 9, 2018, NHL Linesman Ryan Galloway officiated his 1,000th NHL game.
- On February 17, 2018, Washington Capitals head coach Barry Trotz became the fifth coach in league history to coach 1,500 games.
- On February 22, 2018, Nashville Predators goaltender Pekka Rinne reached his 300th win, becoming the 34th goaltender to reach the mark.
- On March 1, 2018, Nashville Predators general manager David Poile won his 1,320th game as a general manager, surpassing Glen Sather for most career wins as a general manager.
- On March 12, 2018, Washington Capitals forward Alexander Ovechkin scored his 600th goal, became the 20th player in league history to reach the mark.
- On March 12, 2018, Vegas Golden Knights goaltender Marc-Andre Fleury recorded his 400th win, becoming the 13th goaltender to reach the mark.
- On March 21, 2018, Calgary Flames forward Matt Stajan played in his 1,000th NHL game, becoming the 319th player to reach the mark.
- On March 29, 2018, Chicago Blackhawks defenceman Brent Seabrook played his 1,000th NHL game, becoming the 320th player to reach the mark.
- On April 1, 2018, Washington Capitals forward Alexander Ovechkin played in his 1,000th NHL game, becoming the 321st player to reach the mark.
- On April 5, 2018, Florida Panthers goaltender Roberto Luongo played his 1,000 NHL game, becoming the 322nd player and 3rd goaltender to reach the mark.
- On April 18, 2018, Pittsburgh Penguins forward Sidney Crosby recorded his 173rd career playoff point, passing Mario Lemieux as the Penguins' all-time leading playoff scorer.

== Uniforms ==
The logo for the NHL's centennial, which continued to be celebrated throughout the 2017 calendar year

- Adidas became the official apparel provider of the NHL beginning with the 2017–18 season. New or otherwise refreshed jerseys for all teams were unveiled on June 20, 2017.
- The Ottawa Senators wore helmet stickers honouring former general manager Bryan Murray, who died in August 2017.
- All jerseys continued to have patches of the NHL's centennial emblem, located above or below the numbers on their right sleeves, for at least up to mid-December and the playing of the NHL 100 Classic.
- The Toronto Maple Leafs wore Toronto Arenas throwback jerseys during their game on December 19, 2017.
- The Buffalo Sabres introduced a new third jersey at the 2018 NHL Winter Classic, wearing the uniform for three additional games later in the season.

== Broadcast rights ==
This was the seventh season under the NHL's ten-year U.S. rights deal with NBC Sports, and the fourth season of its twelve-year Canadian rights deals with Sportsnet and TVA Sports. On December 19, 2017, Rogers Media renewed its sub-licensing agreement with CBC Television for Hockey Night in Canada (which was to expire after this season) through the remainder of its tenure as national rightsholder.

Since CBC and NBC also hold the rights to air the Olympics in their respective countries, Rogers did not schedule any HNIC games on CBC during those Saturdays nights, only airing games on City and Sportsnet. NBC originally decided not to air any NHL games at all during the Olympics, but later reversed course, and added three Sunday afternoon telecasts during the Olympics.

AT&T SportsNet Rocky Mountain (which, along with AT&T SportsNet Pittsburgh, the regional broadcaster of the Pittsburgh Penguins, re-branded from Root Sports over the off-season) was the inaugural regional television rightsholder for the Vegas Golden Knights. TSN re-gained regional English-language rights to the Montreal Canadiens, and extended its radio contract for co-owned CKGM. Rogers Media acquired the radio rights to the Vancouver Canucks for newly acquired 650 CISL.

== See also ==
- 2017–18 NHL transactions
- 2017–18 NHL suspensions and fines
- List of 2017–18 NHL Three Star Awards
- 2017 in sports
- 2018 in sports
