= Scott Moore (television executive) =

Canadian television executive

- Education: Ryerson Polytechnical Institute (now TMU)
- Known for: director of CBC Sports and head of production for Rogers Communications' Sportsnet and NHL properties
- Spouse: Becky
- Awards: Gemini Award; Emmy Award; Jack Webster Award

Scott Moore is a Canadian television executive. He is the former director of CBC Sports and head of production for Rogers Communications' Sportsnet and NHL properties. He was appointed director of CBC Sports on March 1, 2007, succeeding Nancy Lee. On November 9, 2010, Moore left CBC and on the following day he was named president of Sportsnet for Rogers Media. He retired from Rogers at the end of Oct. 2018.

Moore is a graduate of Ryerson Polytechnical Institute's Radio and Television Arts program (1984) in Toronto. He started his broadcasting career with TSN and CTV, and was also with Rogers Sportsnet from 1997 to 2003.

== Career ==
After graduating from Ryerson in 1984, Moore left to backpack across Europe. His resume was handed to The Sports Network (TSN) and he was granted an interview. From there, Moore worked as an assignment editor in the TSN newsroom.

During the 1988 Winter Olympics and 1988 Summer Olympics, Moore worked as a producer. He was later awarded an Emmy Award for his participation in the 1988 Olympic Games and a Gemini Award for the 1988 World Figure Skating Championship. He was subsequently hired as an executive producer for the 1992 Summer Olympics.

From there, Moore helped launch OLN and Sportsnet before moving to British Columbia. He was the co-recipient of the 2005 Jack Webster Award of Excellence in Legal Journalism for his CBC News expose "Crime on the Street" with Ian Hanomansing. Moore later came back to Toronto to run CBC Sports in 2007.

Moore returned to Sportsnet in 2010 and was eventually promoted by Rogers Media to President of Sportsnet and NHL. While working for Rogers, Moore helped broker a deal to gain control of national broadcast rights for the NHL over BCE Inc., including Hockey Night In Canada. However, ratings declined due to the lack of success for Canadian teams in the NHL and the replacement of Ron MacLean with George Stroumboulopoulos. Moore left the company in 2018. Since 2019, Moore has been operating as the CEO of the sports entertainment brand, Uninterrupted Canada, a company founded by LeBron James and filmmaker Maverick Carter.
