= World Curling Hall of Fame =

The World Curling Hall of Fame is an international curling Hall of Fame that was established by World Curling (former the World Curling Federation) in 2012. The induction is given as an honor that recognizes outstanding contributions to the sport of curling, and is awarded annually. Inductees are also awarded the World Curling Freytag Award, an award which predated the Hall of Fame as the highest honor given by World Curling. Previous Freytag Award winners have been inducted into the Hall of Fame.

Inductees in the World Curling Hall of Fame are curlers or builders of the sport of curling; curlers are inducted based on their performance results, ability, sportsmanship, and character, while builders are inducted based on their distinguished service and major contributions to the development of the sport of curling.

== Inductees ==
The inductees are listed as follows:

Year (Note: "Year" denotes year that Freytag Award was awarded to the inductee for dates before 2012, and denotes year of induction from 2012 on.)	Inductee	Country	Category (Note: The builder/curler categorization of awardees was not introduced until 2000.)	Notes
1978	Ken Watson	Canada		
1979	Chuck Hay	Scotland		
1980	Bob Grierson	Scotland		
1981	Doug Maxwell	Canada		
1982	Sven Eklund	Sweden		
1983	Mabel DeWare	Canada		
1984	Robin Welsh	Scotland		
1985	Don McLeod	Canada		
1986	Art Cobb	United States		
1987	Bob Picken	Canada		
1988	Kay Sugahara	United States		
1989	Don McKay	United States		
1990	Colin Campbell	Canada		awarded posthumously
1994	Keith Wendorf	Germany		
1996	Elizabeth Paterson-Brown	Scotland		
1997	Erwin Sautter	Switzerland		
2000	Bob Hardy	United States	Builder	
2000	Ernie Richardson	Canada	Curler	
2001	Shirley Morash	Canada	Builder	
2001	Raymond Somerville	United States	Curler	
2002	Franz Tanner	Switzerland	Builder	
2003	Bob Whitehead	United States	Builder	awarded posthumously
2006	Kunio Nando	Japan	Builder	
2007	Roy Sinclair	Scotland	Builder	
2008	Leslie Ingram-Brown	Scotland	Builder	
2009	Sandra Schmirler	Canada	Curler	awarded posthumously
2010	Malcolm Richardson	Scotland	Builder	
2011	Ray Kingsmith	Canada	Builder	awarded posthumously
2012	Jean-Paul Bidaud	Switzerland	Builder	
2012	Elisabet Gustafson	Sweden	Curler	
2012	Günther Hummelt	Austria	Builder	awarded posthumously
2013	Don Duguid	Canada	Curler	
2013	Ron Northcott	Canada	Curler	
2014	Randy Ferbey	Canada	Curler	
2014	Patrick Hürlimann	Switzerland	Curler	
2014	Eigil Ramsfjell	Norway	Curler	
2015	Russ Howard	Canada	Curler	
2015	Hiroyuki Saito	Japan	Builder	
2015	Ray Turnbull	Canada	Builder	
2016	Warren Hansen	Canada	Builder	
2016	Elisabeth Högström	Sweden	Curler	
2016	Franco Zumofen	Italy	Builder	
2017	Ernie Richardson; Arnold Richardson; Garnet Richardson; Wes Richardson	Canada	Curlers	E. Richardson also received the Freytag Award in 2000
2018	Kevin Martin	Canada	Curler	
2018	Young C. Kim	South Korea	Builder	
2018	Elmer Freytag	United States	Builder	awarded posthumously
2018	Shorty Jenkins	Canada	Builder	awarded posthumously
2019	Dordi Nordby	Norway	Curler	
2019	Michael Burns Sr.	Canada	Builder	awarded posthumously
2019	Ian Michael Thomson	Scotland	Builder	
2020	Elisabet Gustafson; Katarina Nyberg; Louise Marmont; Elisabeth Persson	Sweden	Curlers	Gustafson is also individually inducted in 2012
2020	Gordon Craig	Canada	Builder	
2020	Leif Öhman	Sweden	Builder	
2021	Anette Norberg; Eva Lund; Cathrine Lindahl; Anna Le Moine	Sweden	Curlers	
2021	Bernie Sparkes	Canada	Curlers	
2021	Johannes Jensen	Denmark	Builder	
2022	Jan Betker; Joan McCusker; Marcia Gudereit	Canada	Curlers	
2022	Ian Tetley	Canada	Curler	
2022	Peter Becker	New Zealand	Builder	
2023	Ewan MacDonald	Scotland	Curler	
2023	Peter Smith	Scotland	Curler	
2023	Bill Strum	United States	Curler	
2023	Kate Caithness	Scotland	Builder	
2023	Jack Lynch	Canada	Builder	awarded posthumously
2024	Thomas Ulsrud	Norway	Curler	awarded posthumously
2024	Sonja Gaudet	Canada	Curler	
2024	Les Harrison	Canada	Builder	
2024	Jalle Jungnell	Sweden	Curler/Builder	
2024	Pål Trulsen	Norway	Curler/Builder	
2024	Olli Rissanen	Finland	Builder	
2025	Peja Lindholm; Tomas Nordin; Magnus Swartling; Peter Narup	Sweden	Curlers	
2025	Wayne Middaugh	Canada	Curler	
2026	David Nedohin; Scott Pfeifer; Marcel Rocque	Canada	Curlers	
2026	Glenn Howard	Canada	Curler	
2026	György Nagy	Hungary	Builder	
