= Elizabeth Paterson-Brown =

Vice-president of the World Curling Federation
- In office 1990–1994

Personal details
- Born: 28 January 1929 Edinburgh, Scotland
- Died: 13 January 2009 (aged 87) Edinburgh, Scotland

Elizabeth Paterson-Brown MBE (28 January 1929 – 13 January 2009) was a Scottish curler who held the position of vice-president for the World Curling Federation from 1990 to 1994. She was awarded the Freytag Award in 1996 and inducted into the WCF Hall of Fame in 2002. Paterson-Brown was named a Member of the Order of the British Empire in 1999.

== Career ==
After completing her education, Paterson-Brown worked in her father's wool business. In 1966, Paterson-Brown started her curling career when she became the president of the Ford Ladies Curling Club. Later on, she joined the Royal Caledonian Curling Club as a member and became president of Royal Caledonian's ladies curling division from 1987 to 1988. Following her times as president, Paterson-Brown became the vice-president of the World Curling Federation in 1990 and held the position until 1994. Outside of her career as vice-president, Paterson-Brown was a secretary and skip during a 1981 ladies curling tournament for Scotland.

== Awards and honours ==
In 1996, Paterson-Brown was awarded the World Curling Federation Freytag Award. She was later inducted into the WCF Hall of Fame upon establishment in 2012. Paterson-Brown was also named a Member of the Order of the British Empire at the 1999 Birthday Honours.

== Personal life ==
Paterson-Brown was born on 28 January 1929 in Edinburgh, Scotland. She completed a secretarial course in London's Denson College.

Paterson-Brown was married with two children. She died in Edinburgh on 13 January 2009.
