= Shirley Morash =

Canadian curler

Shirley Morash is a Canadian curler from Dartmouth, Nova Scotia. In 1996 she was inducted into the Curling Canada Hall of Fame in recognition of her services to the sport. She was elected to the Canadian Curling Association Board of Directors in 1991 and was president from 1995 to 1996. In 2002 she won the World Curling Freytag Award.

Born in Winnipeg, Manitoba, she moved to Dartmouth in 1945.
