= Let's Do It (TV program) =

- Genre: Fitness/sports
- Created by: Bob Moir
- Presented by: Tom McKee; Debbie Molina
- Country of origin: Canada
- Original language: English
- No. of seasons: 1
- No. of episodes: 11

Production
- Producer: Bob Moir

Original release
- Network: CBC Television
- Release: 26 June – 11 September 1974

Let's Do It is a Canadian instructional sports television program that aired on CBC Television in 1974.

== Premise ==
This program explained how to improve physical fitness and included segments featuring sports that were less represented in television coverage.

== Scheduling ==
This half-hour program was broadcast Wednesdays at 7:30 p.m. (Eastern) from 26 June to 11 September 1974.
