= Compass (1986 TV program) =

CBC local television newscast for Prince Edward Island, Canada

- Also known as: CBC News: Compass
- Genre: News program
- Presented by: Louise Martin; Jay Scotland
- Country of origin: Canada

Production
- Running time: 60 minutes

Original release
- Network: CBC Television (CBCT-DT); Air at: 6:00 PM to 7:00 PM Daily
- Release: 1971 – present

Compass is a 60-minute local CBC television news program based in Charlottetown, Prince Edward Island, Canada. Broadcast weeknights from 6:00 to 7:00 p.m. AT on CBCT-DT, it is the only PEI-specific television newscast available in the province.

The first mention of "Compass" in the TV listings of the local newspaper was on January 22, 1974. At that time, it was 10 minutes long. Prior to that, it was listed as "Island Gazette."

Roger Younker was its longest-serving anchor until his departure in 2002. Younker became well-known and trusted within Prince Edward Island. The program's humorous and popular weatherman, Kevin "Boomer" Gallant, also joined the show in 1986.

Bruce Rainnie replaced Younker as the show's permanent host in 2003, and announced on 23 February 2017, that he would be departing Compass at the end of April. Less than a week later, longtime weatherman Kevin "Boomer" Gallant announced his retirement after 31 years with Compass. Both Gallant and Rainnie ended their tenures with the program on Friday, 28 April 2017.

Sara Fraser assumed interim anchor duties for Compass on 1 May 2017, and Kalin Mitchell (weatherman for CBHT and CBAT) assumed temporary weather forecasting duties the same day, He later worked at CTV Atlantic on 26 March 2018.

On 30 May 2017, Louise Martin was named permanent host, and Jay Scotland permanent weather meteorologist.

== Overview ==
In about 1995, reporter Sara Fraser was brought on as co-anchor with Younker. But in 2000, as a result of budget-cuts, all local supper-hour CBC newscasts were replaced with Canada Now, a hybrid national and local newscasts. Younker continued as sole anchor of the PEI-specific half from Charlottetown, with a national program following at 6:30PM local time, presented by Ian Hanomansing from the network's Vancouver studios. In 2002, with Younker's departure, former co-host and long-time correspondent Sara Fraser temporarily succeeded him for one year. In 2003, newcomer Bruce Rainnie was brought in as a permanent replacement for Younker/Fraser as the anchor, and brought his own unique style to the program. Sara Fraser continues as a frequent substitute anchor and correspondent. In May 2006, the local half of the newscast was renamed CBC News at Six: Prince Edward Island.

In February 2007, Canada Now was scrapped. The same day, the Prince Edward Island newscast was expanded to a full hour, with local news in the first 30 minutes and national & international news in the second half-hour – albeit, produced and presented locally. The title of the program was also changed back to the original Compass.

In September 2009, Compass was split into two separate half-hour newscasts, at 5:00 PM and 6:00 PM, with the pan-regional program CBC News: Maritimes at 5:30 from CBAT aired at 5:30 PM. In January 2010, CBC News: Maritimes at 5:30 was cancelled and replaced with a 5:30 p.m. edition of Compass, effectively creating a 90-minute program. In October 2015, Compass returned to a one-hour format.

On 18 March 2020, due to the COVID-19 pandemic in Canada, the Canadian Broadcasting Corporation ceased broadcast of many local newscasts across the country, including Compass. After receiving backlash for the decision by many including Prince Edward Island's Premier Dennis King, CBC announced on 25 March that Compass would return to the air on 26 March.

=== Recognition ===
As the only PEI-specific newscast in the province, Compass frequently trounces CTV Atlantic's regional newscasts in the island's supper-hour news ratings.

In October 2008, the program won a Gemini award for its coverage of a major ice storm earlier that year.

In May 2021 RTDNA Enterprise award winner CBC PEI – I Live Here Now. Excellence in Data Storytelling winner CBC PEI – Climate Change Now: How Daily Life Has Already Changed on P.E.I.

RTDNA Awards – East Region Winners:

In April 2023, the program won a GOLD Atlantic Journalism Award for Best Newscast and SILVER for Breaking/Spot News for the piece “MV Holiday Island fire”, by Steve Bruce, CBC Prince Edward Island.

In June 2023, winner of an RTDNA award for Excellence in Editing (Small/Medium Market) for the piece "From Then to Now, Fiona’s Historic Hammering of Prince Edward Island"

In 2026, the program won a Canadian Screen Award for Best Local Newscast.

== Notable on-air staff ==
=== Anchors ===
- Roger Younker (1986–2002)
- Sara Fraser (1995–2000; 2002–2003; 2017)
- Bruce Rainnie (2003–2017)
- Louise Martin (2017–present)

=== Weather ===
- Kevin "Boomer" Gallant (1986–2017)
- Kalin Mitchell (2017)
- Jay Scotland (2017–present)

== See also ==
- CBC Television local newscasts
