= Ron Devion =

Canadian television executive

Ron Devion is a Canadian television executive who worked for the Canadian Broadcasting Corporation.

A native of Winnipeg, Devion began his career at the CBC in 1955 in the accounts department. In 1977 he became program director for CBLT in Toronto.

Devion then served as head of television sports. In this role he was in charge of the CBC's Olympic broadcasts, the CFL on CBC, and Hockey Night in Canada. In 1980, Devion had a number of guest commentators provide analysis during the intermissions of Hockey Night in Canada. He would go to a bar near the CBC's Toronto studios to see how the patrons reacted to the guest. He noticed that Don Cherry received the most attention from the patrons and decided to hire him full-time for $50 an appearance.

In 1982, Devion was named director of television in British Columbia. During his tenure in B.C., Devion used co-funding (working with independent producers, Telefilm Canada, and others to co-produce programs) as a way to minimize the damage of budget cutbacks. CBC British Columbia produced a number of programs that were picked up by the national network, including Good Rockin' Tonite, The Best Years, and The Canadian Gardener. Another program produced by CBC British Columbia, Switchback, was adapted for local broadcast by other affiliates.

In April 1988, Devion was appointed to the newly created position of Director of Co-Funding for the English television network. In this role, he was responsible for finding private sector and government financing for television programs (outside of news and documentary programming) and obtaining programs from local affiliates to broadcast nationally. One of the local programs Devion picked up for national broadcast was On the Road Again. In 1990 he was offered the position of deputy national head of entertainment, but instead chose to retire.

In 1994, Devion came out of retirement to lead CBC's host broadcaster unit at the 1994 Commonwealth Games in Victoria, British Columbia. Under Devion's leadership the CBC, which expected to lose $11 million on the games, made a $5 million profit. Due to the success of the '94 games, Devion was offered positions with Atlanta Olympic Broadcasting '96, the in-house broadcasting unit of the 1996 Summer Olympics, and Radio Televisyen Malaysia, the host broadcaster of the 1998 Commonwealth Games. However, he chose to remain retired.

Devion currently resides in Brentwood Bay, British Columbia. He had written and published two books; From Stardust and From Stardust, Book II: Personal Memoir.
