= Don Goodwin =

Canadian announcer and media executive (1930–2018)

Don Goodwin (July 24, 1930 – August 21, 2018) was a Canadian announcer and media executive. He spent a 31-year career with the Canadian Broadcasting Corporation (CBC), during which time he was the head of television entertainment and the CBC Sports division; led the network's coverage of the 1976 Summer Olympics in Montreal; and served as the director of the Ontario region. He was most famous for a 23-day stint in 1989, when he hosted the CBC's national and Toronto-area evening newscasts during a strike that took The National off the air, which turned him into a household name and face overnight. Goodwin retired months after the strike but continued as a tennis and squash announcer and was the public address announcer for the 1996 Summer Olympics opening ceremony.

== Career ==
Goodwin was born in Toronto on July 24, 1930. He started his career in radio at CKSO and CHNO in Sudbury and at CKY and CKRC in Winnipeg before moving to Halifax, Nova Scotia, to serve in the Canadian Army. He was later recruited to join CJCH, soon defecting to the Canadian Broadcasting Corporation (CBC) in 1957 as their television sportscaster at CBHT. He served as an announcer for a variety of sports, with notable assignments including the 1963 fight between Cassius Clay vs. Henry Cooper and the Olympics beginning in 1964. Goodwin was appointed regional supervisor of sports and special events for the Maritimes in 1966. In the 1960s, he was instrumental in the organization of the first Canada Games, and he was the chef de mission of the Canadian Olympic delegation in 1972.

As head of CBC Sports beginning in 1971, Goodwin led the coverage of the 1976 Summer Olympics in Montreal; at his urging, the network increased its coverage from 14 hours for the Munich Games in 1972 to 169 hours, a figure that more than doubled the output of the much larger ABC crew. In addition, beginning in 1975, Goodwin was named the entertainment director for CBC Television, which included program acquisition and coordinating the Canadian drama department. When the Ontario region was created within the CBC in 1976, he became its director. He also served as an adjunct journalism professor at the University of Western Ontario.

On March 16, 1989, 2,600 CBC employees under the Canadian Union of Public Employees launched a strike that lasted 23 days. Peter Mansbridge, the host of The National—the flagship CBC television news program—was a union employee and joined the walkout. Goodwin stepped in to present CBC at Six, the evening news on Toronto's CBLT normally hosted by Hilary Brown, and the replacement for The National (aired at 10 p.m.), bearing the title CBC News. Goodwin had been a strike replacement for The National on two other occasions for a total of three days, but he otherwise had not had regular on-camera duties since 1971. The strike catapulted Goodwin—who had been set to retire the next month—into the spotlight as the labor dispute's most visible face. Mark Dunn of The Canadian Press called him "the Clark Kent of ... The National", attaining "folk-hero status" per Antonia Zerbisias. In the Toronto Star, Joey Slinger commented that Goodwin's face was credible and more relatable, "a face that looks as if it is touched by the news" compared to Mansbridge's "Saran Wrap"–preserved face. During the strike, Goodwin put in 15-hour days, combining newsreading with his normal office tasks.

Just as union members tentatively agreed to a deal with the CBC on April 5, Charles Yacoub hijacked a bus and drove it onto Parliament Hill in Ottawa, forcing Goodwin into the anchor chair to handle five hours of special coverage. Goodwin's last newscast aired that night, and he retired in May, to be succeeded by William T. Armstrong. He moved to Niagara-on-the-Lake, where he became involved with tennis tournaments and as an editor for Tennis Canada magazines. He also worked as a public address announcer, including for the 1996 Summer Olympics opening ceremony. For 35 years, he was the master of the ceremonies of the Canadian Open in tennis and multiple squash events including the Tournament of Champions for 30 years. He co-founded Sports Media Canada, an organization for sports journalists, with George Gross.

Goodwin died of pancreatic cancer on August 21, 2018.
