= Don Chevrier =

Canadian sports announcer (1937–2007)

- Born: December 29, 1937; Toronto, Ontario, Canada
- Died: December 17, 2007 (aged 69); Palm Harbor, Florida, United States
- Occupation: Sports commentator
- Years active: 1972-2006
- Known for: Toronto Blue Jays; Canadian Football League; Ottawa Senators; Olympic Games
- Awards: Canadian Football Hall of Fame

Don Chevrier (December 29, 1937 – December 17, 2007) was a Canadian sports announcer. He worked in television and radio, and was born in Toronto, Ontario.

== Biography ==
=== Early life and career ===
He began his broadcasting career at CJCA in Edmonton, Alberta at the age of 16 covering high school sports for radio. From 1972 to 1981, he was co-host of Curling Classic, a television program on the Canadian Broadcasting Corporation (CBC) that was earlier hosted by Alex Trebek.

In 1972, Chevrier was the ringside commentator for the World Heavyweight Championship between Joe Frazier and Ron Stander.

=== Toronto Blue Jays, CFL, Ottawa Senators ===
In 1977, he became the original television voice of the Toronto Blue Jays Major League Baseball team. He spent the next 20 years as a commentator on the Jays' television broadcast crew. He called Nolan Ryan's seventh no-hitter when the Rangers played against the Blue Jays on May 1, 1991. Throughout the 1970s, he broadcast curling and the Canadian Football League for CBC, calling several Grey Cups as well as Briers. In the early 1980s he moved to CTV, where he remained a fixture in its sports department into the early nineties. In 1991, he called the Canada Cup hockey tournament for the network and from 1992–93 until 1997–98 he was the television voice for the NHL's Ottawa Senators for CHRO-TV, working alongside Greg Millen.

Chevrier was inducted into the Football Reporters of Canada section of the Canadian Football Hall of Fame in 2016.

=== Olympic Games broadcasts ===
Chevrier also provided television network coverage of the Olympic Games for North American audiences since 1972, working for the CBC, the American Broadcasting Company (ABC), and the CTV Television Network before moving on to NBC. More recently, he covered events at the 2004 Summer Olympics, including badminton, table tennis, and synchronized swimming for NBC, and, along with longtime partner, Don Duguid, called curling at the 2002 Winter Olympics in Salt Lake City and in the 2006 Winter Olympics in Turin for NBC.

=== Personal life and death ===
Chevrier resided in Palm Harbor, Florida He died at home on December 17, 2007, from a blood disorder.

Preceded by Don Wittman	CBC Sports Lead Curling announcer 1969–1982	Succeeded by Don Wittman
Preceded by None	TSN Lead Curling announcer 1984–1985	Succeeded by Vic Rauter
