= List of 2018 Winter Olympics broadcasters =

The 2018 Winter Olympics in Pyeongchang are televised by a number of broadcasters throughout the world. As with previous years, Olympic Broadcasting Services together with Japan's NHK produces the world feed provided to local broadcasters for use in their coverage, including about 90 hours of content captured in 8K.

The Games are broadcast in ultra-high resolution and high dynamic range in select markets. In South Korea, terrestrial UHD broadcasts employ ATSC 3.0 standard, launched on May 31, 2017, by SBS, MBC, and KBS in major South Korean markets such as Seoul and Incheon. In the United States UHD broadcasts are available to cable subscribers of NBCUniversal, and to subscribers of satellite TV providers DirecTV and Dish Network.

== Broadcasters ==
On 29 June 2015, the IOC announced that Discovery Communications—owner of Eurosport, had acquired exclusive rights to the Olympics from 2018 through 2024 across Europe, excluding Russia, on all platforms. Discovery will sub-license its broadcast rights to local free-to-air networks on a territorial basis. Discovery's rights deal will, initially, not cover France due to pre-existing rights deals with France Télévisions that run through the 2020 Games. Unlike previous pan-European deals, such as with the European Broadcasting Union and Sportfive, Discovery will not solely serve as a reseller, and intends to carry coverage on its regional properties, but has committed to sub-licensing at least 100 hours of coverage to free-to-air networks. In the United Kingdom, Discovery will sub-license exclusive pay television rights from the BBC (which still holds broadcast rights through 2020), in exchange for sub-licensing free-to-air rights to the 2022 and 2024 Olympics from Discovery.

Russian state broadcaster Channel One, and sports channel Match TV, committed to covering the Games with a focus on Russian athletes. Russia was not affected by the Eurosport deal, due to a pre-existing contract held by a marketing agency which extends to 2024.

In the United States, the Games were once again broadcast by NBCUniversal properties under its long-term contract with the IOC. Its coverage featured several notable changes in format; citing past criticism of its use of broadcast delay during past Olympic Games (especially for viewers in the Western United States; Pyeongchang has a 14-hour difference with U.S. Eastern Time, and 17-hour difference with U.S. Pacific Time), the prime time block was revamped with a focus on live coverage, and made available live nationwide and on streaming for the first time. in February 2017, long-time studio host Bob Costas also stepped down as host, being replaced by Mike Tirico.

In addition, IMG was awarded the in-flight/in-ships broadcast rights. The Olympic Channel will broadcast the Games across the Indian subcontinent.

Territory	Rights holder	Ref
Asia	Dentsu (Note: Rights to be sold to local broadcaster)	
Australia	Seven Network	
Brazil	Grupo Globo	
Canada	CBC/Radio-Canada; Bell Media; Rogers Media; TLN	
Caribbean	International Media Content Ltd.; SportsMax	
Cayman Islands	Cayman 27	
China	CCTV	
Cuba	ICRT	
Europe	Eurosport	
Albania	RTSH	
Andorra	RTVA	
Armenia	APMTV	
Austria	ORF	
Azerbaijan	AzTV; İdman TV	
Belarus	Belteleradio	
Belgium	VRT	
Bosnia and Herzegovina	BHRT	
Bulgaria	BNT	
Croatia	HRT	
Czech Republic	ČT	
Denmark	DR	
Estonia	Eesti Meedia	
Finland	Yle	
Georgia	GPB	
Germany	ARD; ZDF	
Greece	ERT	
Hungary	MTVA	
Iceland	RÚV	
Ireland	RTÉ	
Israel	Sport 5	
Italy	RAI (Note: Including microstate of San Marino and Vatican City)	
Kosovo	RTK	
Latvia	LTV	
Liechtenstein	SRG SSR	
Lithuania	TV3	
Macedonia	MRT	
Moldova	TVR; TRM	
Montenegro	RTCG	
Netherlands	NOS	
Norway	TVNorge	
Poland	TVP	
Portugal	RTP	
Romania	TVR	
Serbia	RTS	
Slovakia	RTVS	
Slovenia	RTV	
Spain	DMAX	
Sweden	Kanal 5	
Switzerland	SRG SSR	
Turkey	TRT	
Ukraine	UA:PBC	
United Kingdom	BBC; Eurosport	
France	France Télévisions	
Hong Kong	TVB	
India	Jio TV	
Iran	IRIB Varzesh	
Japan	Japan Consortium	
Kazakhstan	RTRK	
Kyrgyzstan	KTRK	
Latin America	América Móvil	
Malaysia	Astro	
MENA	beIN Sports	
Mongolia	TV5	
New Zealand	Sky Television	
North Korea	SBS	
Oceania	Sky Television	'
Pakistan	PTV	
Philippines	TV5 Network	
Russia	Perviy Kanal; VGTRK; Match TV	
Singapore	Eleven Sports Network; MediaCorp	
South Africa	SABC; SuperSport	
South Korea	SBS; MBC; KBS	
Sub-Saharan Africa	Econet Media; SuperSport	
Taiwan	ELTA	
Tajikistan	Varzish TV	
Thailand	Workpoint TV	
United States	NBCUniversal	
Uzbekistan	Uzreport TV	
Vietnam	VTV	
