= Academy Achievement Award =

Award presented by the Canadian Gemini Awards

The Academy Achievement Award is an award presented by the Canadian Gemini Awards to an individual for their "exceptional, outstanding or ongoing contribution or service to the Canadian television industry." It is presented at the discretion of the Academy of Canadian Cinema & Television (not necessarily every year).

== List of past recipients ==
- 1996: W.K. Donovan
- 1997: Arthur Weinthal
- 1998: Jim Burt
- 1999: A. Gordon Craig
- 2000: W. Paterson Ferns
- 2001: Dorothy Gardner
- 2002: Trina McQueen
- 2003: Michael Maclear
- 2007: John Kastner
- 2010: Linda Schuyler
- 2011: Christina Jennings
- 2013: Jeanne Beker

== See also ==
- Canadian television awards
