= James E. Armstrong =

Canadian sports executive (1877–1960)

James Edward Armstrong (June 2, 1877 – November 22, 1960) was a Canadian sports executive who served as president of the Regina Rugby Club and the Dominion Curling Association.

== Biography ==
Armstrong was born on June 2, 1877, in Stratford, Ontario. His twin brother, George Armstrong, was the Dominion weights and measures inspector for Saskatchewan. In 1906, Armstrong moved to Regina, Saskatchewan, to join his brother-in-law, J. A. Westman, in the insurance business. He later partnered with F. R. Logan before starting his own insurance and real estate loan business. He also formed the Queen City Curling Stone Company with George Peacock and Dick Day and was the company's secretary.

In 1911 and 1915, Armstrong was president of the Saskatchewan Rugby Union. In 1915, he was president of the Regina Rugby Club. During World War I, Armstrong was a captain in the Royal Canadian Army Service Corps.

From 1930 to 1934, Armstrong was chairman of the Saskatchewan Liquor Commission.

Armstrong was secretary of the Queen City Gardens from 1937 to 1944 and promoted the fundraising drive for the arena's artificial ice. He was president of the Regina Curling Club, Saskatchewan Curling Association, and the Dominion Curling Association. He died on November 22, 1960.
