= Dave Parkes =

Canadian sports executive

Dave J. Parkes is the former general manager and chief executive officer of the Canadian Curling Association from 1988 until 2007.

A Winnipeg native, Parkes joined the CCA in Ottawa in 1988 as its general manager and became its chief executive officer in 2000. Parkes immediately helped with the amalgamation of the Canadian Ladies Curling Association and Curl Canada into the Canadian Curling Association in 1990. During the remainder of his tenure, he oversaw the creation of the sport's Season of Champions: a series of national and international championships, which have provided, on average, 175 hours of television coverage annually, more than any other amateur sport in Canada.

Parkes came under tremendous heat during the 2004–05 season, when he was criticized for how the CCA handled its television programming. The CCA had sold the rights to television broadcasts of the Tim Hortons Brier, Scott Tournament of Hearts and Ford World Curling Championship to the CBC. This was criticized by many in the curling community, as the CBC did not show some games on the main network, and had other disorganized scheduling problems. However, the CCA was able to work things out for the following season, by bringing back TSN's broadcast of round robin curling games.

Parkes stepped down as CEO on May 11, 2007, seven months ahead of schedule. Greg Stremlaw was appointed as his successor and assumed duties on October 9, 2007.

Parkes will be inducted into the Canadian Curling Hall of Fame in 2019.
