= Curling Canada =

Sports governing body

- Sport: Curling
- Jurisdiction: National
- Founded: 1990
- Headquarters: Ottawa
- Chairman: Teri Palynchuk
- CEO: Nolan Thiessen
- Sponsor: Sport Canada

Official website
- curling.ca
- (Canada)

Curling Canada (formerly the Canadian Curling Association (CCA)) is a sanctioning body for the sport of curling in Canada. It is associated with more than a dozen provincial and territorial curling associations across the country, and organizes Canada's national championships in the sport. It was formed in 1990 by the merger of the two previous sanctioning bodies, Curl Canada (men's) and the Canadian Ladies' Curling Association (women's).

== History ==
The CCA was created in 1990 when Curl Canada and the Canadian Ladies' Curling Association amalgamated. From its creation until 2007, Dave Parkes was the general manager and then chief executive officer (CEO).

Greg Stremlaw was the CEO until 2015 when he took over as head of sports at CBC Sports Katherine Henderson became CEO in 2016 and continued to be in that role until August 2023, when she became CEO of Hockey Canada. Danny Lamoureux took over as interim CEO as her replacement. Nolan Thiessen was appointed CEO in January 2024.

On February 27, 2015, the organization rebranded as Curling Canada.

== Presidents (Chairs of the Board 2008–present) ==
- 1935–38: John Thomas Haig
- 1938–39: Elbridge MacKay
- 1939–40: Ross Harstone
- 1940–41: Dr. A. F. Anderson
- 1941–42: Hon. Thane Campbell
- 1942–46: George Norgan
- 1946–47: James E. Armstrong
- 1947–48: Hon. Brig. Colin A. Campbell
- 1948–49: Murray Macneill
- 1949–50: Gordon Hudson
- 1950–51: Fred Lucas
- 1951–52: Niven Jackson
- 1952–53: Fielding Rankine
- 1953–54: Emmett Smith
- 1954–55: Cyril Boyd
- 1955–56: Hon. Sen. Richard Donahoe
- 1956–57: John Dutton
- 1957–58: Samuel Rothschild
- 1958–59: Archibald Wilson
- 1959–60: Walter B. Cowan
- 1960–61: Alan MacGowan
- 1961–62: Earl Bourne
- 1962–63: Ted Pattee
- 1963–64: Richard T. Topping
- 1964–65: Arthur Skinner
- 1965–66: Frank Sargent
- 1966–67: Hon. Gordon Lockhart Bennett
- 1967–68: William Lumsden
- 1968–69: Harry P. Carter
- 1969: Alf Parkhill
- 1969–70: H. P. Webb
- 1970–71: Dr. Maurice Campbell
- 1971–72: T. Gordon Thompson
- 1972–73: Irl England
- 1973–74: D. William Currie
- 1974–75: L. E. Olson
- 1975–76: William Leaman
- 1976–77: David C. Smith
- 1977–78: Herbert Millham
- 1978–79: G. Clifton Thompson
- 1979–80: Frank Stent
- 1980–81: Cecil Watt
- 1981–82: Thomas Fisher
- 1982–83: Cyril S. Walters
- 1983–84: Ray Kingsmith
- 1984–85: Dr. Clyde Opaleychuk
- 1985–86: Ralph Boyd
- 1986–87: Jerry Muzika
- 1987–88: Harvey Mazinke
- 1988–89: Joseph Gurowka
- 1989–90: Dr. Edward Steeves
- 1990: Donald R. MacLeod
- 1990–91: Dr. Edward Steeves
- 1991–92: Mary-Anne Nicholson
- 1992–93: Stanley Oleson
- 1993–94: Evelyn Krahn
- 1994–95: Lorne Mitton
- 1995–96: Shirley Morash
- 1996–97: Pat Reid
- 1997–98: Harvey Malo
- 1998–99: Judy Veinot
- 1999-00: Jack Boutilier
- 2000–01: Zivan Saper
- 2001–02: Don Lewis
- 2002–03: Maureen Miller
- 2003–04: Don Petlak
- 2004–05: Barry Greenberg
- 2005–06: Jerry Shoemaker
- 2006–07: Donna Duffett
- 2007–08: Al Forsythe
- 2008–09: Fran Todd
- 2009–10: Graham Prouse
- 2010–11: Jack Bowman
- 2011–12: Laura Lochanski
- 2012–13: Ron Hutton
- 2013–14: Hugh Avery
- 2014–15: Marilyn Neily
- 2015–16: Hugh Avery
- 2016–17: Peter Inch
- 2017–18: Resby Coutts
- 2018–19: Maureen Miller
- 2019–20: John Shea
- 2020–21: Mitch Minken (until June 2021)
- 2021–22: Amy Nixon (from June 2021)
- 2022–24: Michael Szajewski
- 2024–26: Teri Palynchuk

== Championship events ==
- Canadian Mixed Curling Championship
- Canadian Mixed Doubles Curling Championship
- Canadian Junior Curling Championships
- Canadian Visually Impaired Curling Championship
- Scotties Tournament of Hearts (women's nationals)
- Montana's Brier (men's nationals)
- PointsBet Invitational
- Canada Cup of Curling
- Canadian Wheelchair Curling Championship
- Canadian Senior Curling Championships
- Canadian Masters Curling Championships

== Member Associations ==
- Curling Alberta
- Curl BC
- Curling Québec
- Curl Manitoba
- New Brunswick Curling Association
- Newfoundland and Labrador Curling Association
- Northern Ontario Curling Association
- Northwest Territories Curling Association
- Nova Scotia Curling Association
- Nunavut Curling Association
- Curling Ontario (Southern Ontario)
- Curl PEI
- CURLSASK
- Yukon Curling Association

== See also ==
- Curling in Canada
- Canadian Curling Hall of Fame
- Canadian Team Ranking System (CTRS) standings
