= Doug Maxwell =

Canadian sports broadcaster

- Birth name: Douglas Dean Maxwell
- Born: 1927; Toronto, Canada
- Died: August 31, 2007 (aged 79–80)
- Occupation: Sports journalist

Douglas Dean Maxwell (c. 1927 – August 31, 2007) was a noted Canadian journalist and broadcaster, noted for his coverage in the sport of curling.

Among his accomplishments, Maxwell served as director of the World Curling Championships for 18 years (1968–1985), is credited for inventing the Skins Game, published the Canadian Curling News for 20 years and wrote numerous books including the bestseller Canada Curls. Maxwell is also given credit for introducing time clocks to the game, and turning the World Championships into a major event.

Maxwell served as a member of CBC's first broadcast team for curling. Maxwell was inducted into the Canadian Curling Hall of Fame in 1996 as a builder. Maxwell was also awarded the World Curling Freytag Award, which later led to his induction into the WCF Hall of Fame.

== Books and publications ==
Books by Douglas Dean Maxwell

Tales of a Curling Hack	2006
Canada curls : the illustrated history of curling in Canada	2002
The first fifty : a nostalgic look at the Brier / by Doug Maxwell and friends	1980
Curling (by Ernie Richardson, Joyce McKee and Doug Maxwell)	1962

Periodicals edited by Douglas Dean Maxwell

The Curling News
The Curler: Canada's National Curling Magazine

== Family ==
Maxwell and his wife, Anne, lived in the Markdale, Ontario area.

== Death ==
Doug Maxwell died of cancer, aged 80 on August 31, 2007. He was survived by his wife of 54 years, Anne Maxwell; their four children and numerous grandchildren and extended family.
