= Greg Stremlaw =

Canadian sports executive

Greg Stremlaw is a Canadian sports executive who is the president of the Indy Eleven of the United Soccer League. He was CEO of the Canadian Curling Association from 2007 to 2015, and executive director of CBC Sports from 2015 to 2019.

== Early life ==
A native of Niagara Falls, Ontario, Stremlaw graduated from Ridley College and earned a degrees from the University of Western Ontario (bachelor of arts in commerce), University of Maine (masters of business administration), and University of Miami (masters of sports management). He later completed executive education courses from Harvard University and the Massachusetts Institute of Technology. While in Miami he was assistant director of the Orange Bowl.

== Early career ==
From 1996 to 2002, Stremlaw was the director of sport services and bobsleigh/luge for the Calgary Olympic Development Association, where he chaired every major event at the Canada Olympic Park. He then was chief executive officer of the Chicopee Ski and Summer Resort in Kitchener, Ontario, where he was able to erase Chicopee's seven-figure debt and turn the resort into a four-season operation that increased its visitor count from 100,000 to 250,000 visitors a year.

== Canadian Curling Association ==
On August 29, 2007 he was named CEO of the Canadian Curling Association, succeeding Dave Parkes. By the end of the year, Stremlaw was able to stabilize the organization, which ran a deficit of $1.4-million before he took over.

== CBC ==
On September 4, 2015, Stremlaw was named head of sports at the Canadian Broadcasting Corporation. In this role he was general manager of the CBC and Radio-Canada's coverage of 2016 and 2018 Olympics and oversaw the CBC's part of Hockey Night in Canada’s operations. In January 2019, Stremlaw left the CBC to become the chief executive officer of the Indy Eleven.
