= CBC Olympic broadcasts =

Olympic broadcasts in Canada

Logo used for CBC's Olympic broadcasts

The broadcasts of Summer and Winter Olympic Games produced by CBC Sports are shown on CBC Television and heard on the CBC's radio networks in Canada. The CBC was the broadcaster of the 2014, 2016, 2018, 2020, 2022, and 2024 Olympics and will continue until 2032.

== History ==
The first telecast of the Olympics on Canadian television was the CBC's broadcast of the 1956 Summer Olympics in Melbourne, Australia. The CBC aired black-and-white highlights of the previous day's events and aired the Canada vs. Soviet Union hockey game live by leasing a standby circuit from CBS and making the CBC's 1st winter Olympics in the 1960 Winter Olympics in Squaw Valley, USA. Critics compared the CBC's overall Olympic coverage unfavourably to that of ABC, which broadcast same-day colour highlights throughout the Games. For the 1960 Summer Olympics in Rome, Italy, the CBC produced a total of 17 hours of radio and TV coverage. CBC Television broadcast same-day highlights each night. The half-hour package featured was provided by CBS Sports, which had the broadcast rights in the United States. CBS sportscasters Bud Palmer, Gil Stratton, and Bob Richards provided commentary. CBS sent videotapes of each day's events by jet to Idlewild Airport (now John F. Kennedy International Airport) in New York City, where a mobile transmission unit there beamed the pictures to the CBC and CBS networks. On radio, Ward Cornell and Thom Benson gave listeners 15-minute reports every evening except Sunday on the CBC's Trans-Canada Network and Doug Smith gave half-hour evening wrap-ups on the CBC's Dominion Network.

The CBC lost their Winter Olympic broadcasting rights to CTV following the 1960 Olympics, but retained their rights to the Summer Olympics. The CBC Television broadcasters for the 1964 Summer games were Ted Reynolds, Dave Cruikshank, Bob McDevitt, Steve Douglas, and Lloyd Robertson. Ward Cornell, Al Hamel, Bob Moir, Don Goodwin, and Bill Good were the broadcasters for CBC Radio. For the Tokyo Olympics, CBC Television used the same satellite as NBCUniversal, the recently launched Syncom 3, to transmit late-night highlight packages of events from that day.

The CBC provided its first colour pictures of Olympic competition during the 1968 Summer Olympics from Mexico City. CBC Radio broadcast five-minute hourly updates and occasional live reports. CBC Olympic host Lloyd Robertson was praised by The Globe and Mail writer Leslie Millin for his cool demeanour in the face of many technical glitches including "strange breaks, noises, lapses and unscheduled fade-outs." Millin applauded Robertson, normally a newscaster, for "working with the grace and agility of a man hired to stamp grapes in a Sicilian winery."

The CBC almost cancelled their plans for coverage of the 1980 Summer Olympics after Canada took part in the boycott, but decided not to and was represented by nine accreditation cards.

Canada's Olympic Broadcast Media Consortium, a joint venture between CTVglobemedia (now Bell Media) and Rogers Media, acquired the rights to broadcast the Vancouver-hosted 2010 Winter Olympics and the 2012 Summer Olympics in London. The move was met with displeasure from Americans close to the border, because they cannot access CTV like they can the CBC and prefer Canada's Olympics coverage over that of U.S. broadcaster NBC.

=== 2014 to present ===
On August 1, 2012, the CBC announced that it had acquired the Canadian broadcast rights to the 2014 Winter Olympics in Sochi and the 2016 Summer Olympics in Rio de Janeiro, returning the Games to the broadcaster for the first time since 2008. While financial details were not announced, the CBC did state that it was a "financially and fiscally responsible bid", which would carry on the organization's 60-year history of Olympic broadcasting. The CBC sublicensed coverage of the Games to TSN and Sportsnet (which were the main cable networks of the Bell/Rogers consortium) in English, and TVA Sports in French. Beginning with the 2014 Winter Paralympics, the Canadian Paralympic Committee acquired the Canadian media rights to the Paralympic Games (which had previously been held by the Bell/Rogers consortium); as part of sub-licensing agreement, the broadcasts are produced in conjunction with CBC Sports and other partners. The CBC also broadcasts the Youth Olympic Games.

On October 28, 2014, it was announced that the CBC had extended its rights to the Olympics through 2020, and that it would continue its arrangements with Bell Media and Rogers Media to provide production resources and distribute coverage through the TSN and Sportsnet networks. The CBC leads production of the telecasts and sells all advertising time, "top-tier" events are reserved primarily for CBC Television, and all events are streamed online on the CBC's Olympic microsites. Again, financial details were not disclosed and the bid was described as being "fiscally responsible", although the broadcasters involved did disclose that they planned to "break even" on their coverage. The renewed partnership came amidst changes and cuts at CBC Sports, as the Olympics remain the only major sports property whose Canadian rights are owned by the CBC, having recently lost its rights to FIFA tournaments (such as the FIFA World Cup) and the National Hockey League to Bell and Rogers respectively (although the CBC continues to air NHL games through a time-brokerage agreement with Rogers), and having announced that, aside from the Olympics, it would no longer pursue broadcast rights to professional sports. Rogers Media president Keith Pelley justified the partnership, stating the number of platforms involved would "satisfy the demands" for Olympic content by Canadian viewers.

In October 2015, the CBC re-branded its weekend sports broadcasts under the blanket title Road to the Olympic Games; the new brand emphasized the CBC''s year-round focus on Olympic sports Also in October 2015, it was announced the CBC that had renewed its rights to cover the 2022 and 2024 Games.

The CBC reported that at least 31.9 million viewers watched a portion of its coverage of the 2016 Summer Olympics, with an average viewership of 2.1 million. The gains were credited to a strong medal performance by Canada during the first 10 days of the Games, and notable performances by Penny Oleksiak and Andre De Grasse; ratings peaked during the men's 100 metre final, featuring De Grasse and world record holder Usain Bolt, which was seen by 6.92 million viewers.

The CBC reported that at least 31 million viewers had watched a portion of its coverage of the 2018 Winter Olympics, while average primetime viewership also saw increases over 2014. After the 2020 Summer Olympics (delayed to 2021 due to the COVID-19 pandemic), the CBC reported that at least 28 million viewers had watched a portion of its coverage, a decline over 2016. The broadcaster also announced that streaming of the Games-related video content was up by 62% over the 2018 Winter Olympics, with 61% of this being live streams. On April 6, 2022, the CBC confirmed that it had renewed its rights to the Olympics through 2032. The following March, CBC renewed its rights to the Paralympics through 2026.

== Hours of coverage ==
Year	Host	Hours of Coverage
1956 Summer	Melbourne, Australia	
1960 Winter	Squaw Valley, United States	
1960 Summer	Rome, Italy	17
1964 Summer	Tokyo, Japan	
1968 Summer	Mexico City, Mexico	30
1972 Summer	Munich, West Germany	
1976 Summer	Montreal, Canada	
1980 Summer	Moscow, Soviet Union	
1984 Winter	Sarajevo, Yugoslavia	
1984 Summer	Los Angeles, United States	
1988 Summer	Seoul, South Korea	
1992 Winter	Albertville, France	
1996 Summer	Atlanta, United States	242
1998 Winter	Nagano, Japan	359
2000 Summer	Sydney, Australia	275
2002 Winter	Salt Lake City, United States	262
2004 Summer	Athens, Greece	282
2006 Winter	Turin, Italy	260
2008 Summer	Beijing, China	281
2014 Winter	Sochi, Russia	1,519
2014 Summer Youth	Nanjing, China	
2016 Winter Youth	Lillehammer, Norway	
2016 Summer	Rio de Janeiro, Brazil	2,000+
2018 Winter	Pyeongchang, South Korea	3,100+
2018 Summer Youth	Buenos Aires, Argentina	
2020 Winter Youth	Lausanne, Switzerland	
2020 Summer	Tokyo, Japan	3,775+
2022 Winter	Beijing, China	2,400+
2024 Winter Youth	Gangwon, South Korea	
2024 Summer	Paris, France	3,000+
2026 Winter	Milan-Cortina, Italy	2,000+

== See also ==
- CBC Sports
