= Bruce Rainnie =

Canadian sportscaster

Bruce Rainnie is a broadcaster for CBC Sports and was the host (2003 to 2017) of CBC News: Compass, the supper-hour news program on CBCT in Prince Edward Island. He has been with CBC since 1995.

Rainnie began his career at CJLS Radio in Yarmouth, Nova Scotia where he hosted the morning show from 1989 to 1995. He received a Canadian Radio Award for inventive broadcasting and was twice named City of the Year for his volunteer work in the community. On his departure from Yarmouth, Rainnie was awarded the Key to the Town, becoming one of only three people ever to receive this honour.

In 1995, Rainnie was a weather man at CBHT during Linda Kelly's newscast until he moved to Prince Edward Island in 2003.

Since joining CBC Sports, Rainnie has broadcast four Olympic games (2000, 2002, 2004, & 2006). In 2006, he called the gold medal performance of the Canadian Women's Hockey team. Also in 2006, Rainnie was first on the scene to interview Brad Gushue after his rink won gold in Men's Curling. In March 2004, he researched, co-produced and hosted Great Expectations, a half-hour primetime documentary on Sidney Crosby. Rainnie has also been host of CBC News Morning, the Celtic Colours Music Festival, Tall Ships 2000, Spruce Meadows Showjumping, Davis Cup Tennis, CFL on CBC, the World Curling Championships, and Hockey Night in Canada.

In 2007, Rainnie replaced the retiring Don Wittman as CBC's lead curling commentator.

Rainnie has also done extensive work as master of ceremonies for various organizations. He has hosted the Progress Club Sports Celebrity Dinner, the Queen Elizabeth Hospital Research Dinner, the Nova Scotia Sport Hall of Fame Induction Ceremonies, the PEI Business Hall of Fame Gala, the Halifax Comedy Festival, the Special Olympics Dinner and Auction, and the CIAU All-Canadian Basketball Awards Dinner.

Rainnie lives in Halifax, Nova Scotia with his wife, accomplished PEI musician Kendra MacGillvray, and their son Mark.

Rainnie was scheduled to call Rowing and Canoeing at the 2008 Summer Olympics but could not attend due to illness.

Preceded by Don Wittman	CBC Sports Lead Curling announcer 2007–present	Incumbent
