= Larry Wood =

American toy car designer (born 1942)

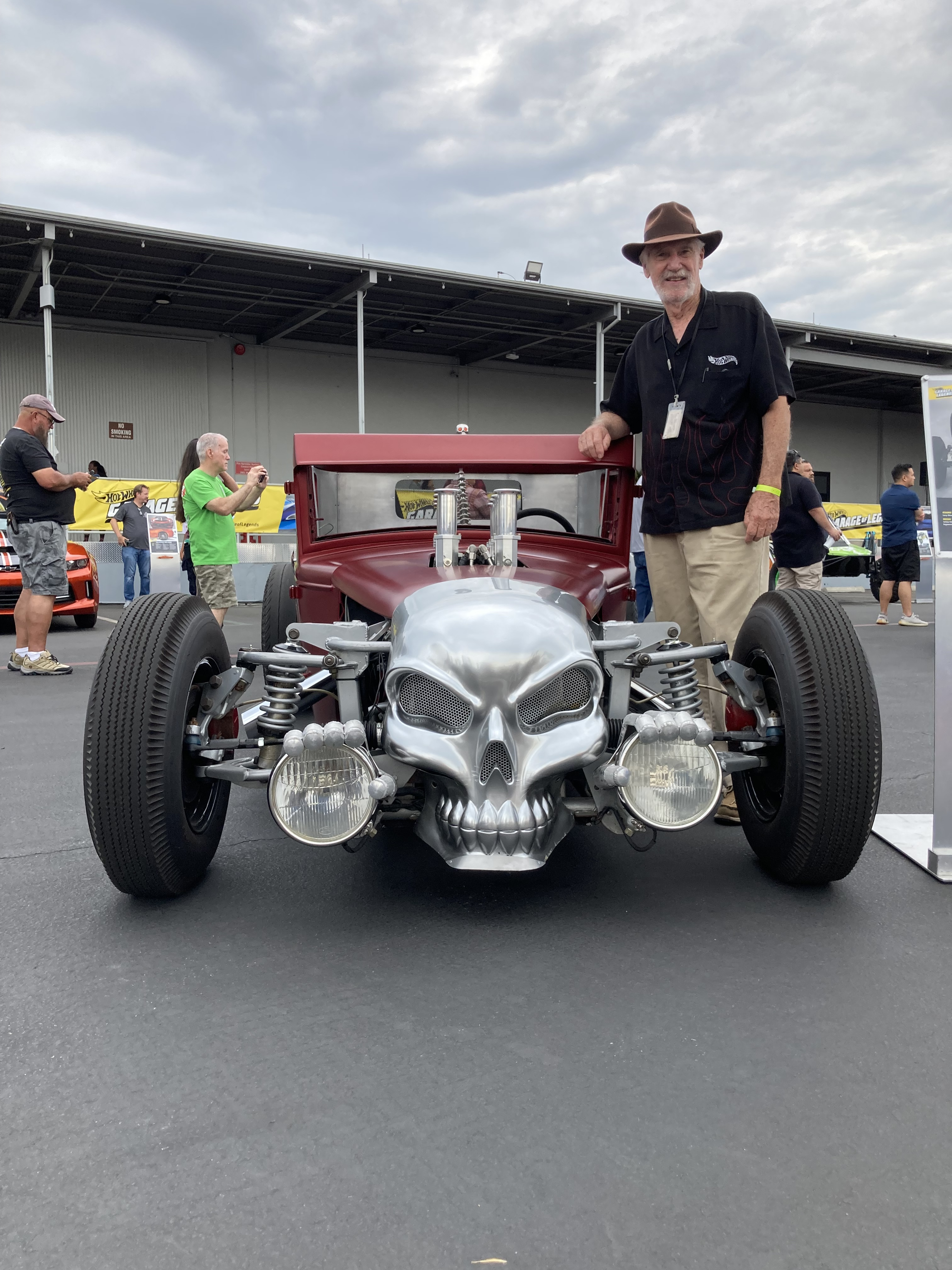
- Wood in 2022 posing next to his creation, the Bone Shaker
- Born: Larry R. Wood; 5 March 1942 (age 84); Middletown, Connecticut, U.S.
- Occupations: Automotive Designer, Toy Designer
- Website: larrywooddesign.com

Larry R. Wood (born 5 March 1942), also known as Mr. Hot Wheels, is an American toy designer. Widely considered the most prolific car designer of all time, he designed Hot Wheels cars for Mattel Toys and is a member of the Automotive Hall of Fame.

== Career ==
In 1969, he started his career with Hot Wheels. His good friend, Howard Rees, a Hot Wheels designer at the time, wanted to design for Mattel's Major Matt Mason action figure line and encouraged Wood to take his place. Wood jumped at the chance and launched a 50-year career with Hot Wheels. His designs include the Bone Shaker, Rodger Dodger, Tri-Baby, and the Purple Passion.

Larry Wood was instrumental in growing the diecast car collector market. He noticed adults were buying Hot Wheels for themselves, not just for their kids. He and the Hot Wheels team started the Red Line Club, tapping into what Hot Wheels collectors wanted.

The development of some collector sets allowed him to collaborate with Carroll Shelby, Jay Leno, Boyd Coddington, Ed" Big Daddy" Roth, and George Barris.

In addition to Hot Wheels, his career also includes work with:

- Ford, General Motors, Chrysler, Honda, Lockheed
- Shelby International on the 2010 Mustang GT350
- Promotions Inc projects, including the Pac-Man car, Mork & Mindy Egg car, Mafia Mixer
- Robosaurus, the Lexus Roadster Show Car, Ivan Stewart's Baja 500 Winning Toyota

In 2009, after 40 years, Larry retired as the full-time chief designer of Hot Wheels, but was hired to continue as a consultant and brand ambassador until 2019, when he officially retired, marking his 50th year with Hot Wheels.

Wood is now a freelance artist, a designer of custom code 3 diecast cars, and launched his first company, Larry Wood Design LLC, at the age of 82.

== Honors ==
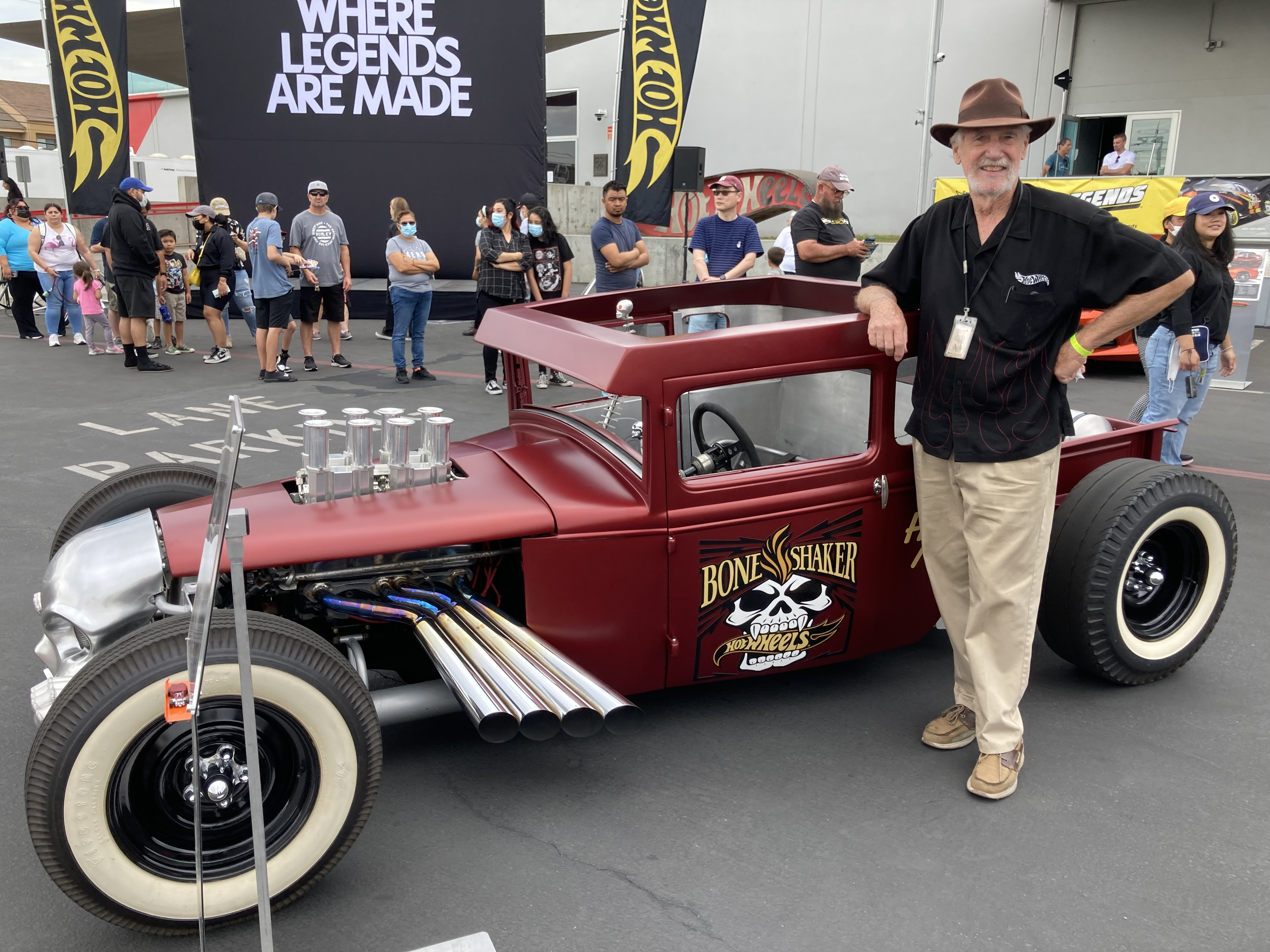
Larry Wood, Hot Wheels designer, posing next to a recreation of Bone Shaker

Wood was inducted into the Hot Wheels Hall of Fame in 2003. He also became a member of the Model Car Hall of Fame, formerly the Diecast Hall of Fame in 2009 & 2014, the West Coast Kustoms Hall of Fame in 2019, and the Pop Culture Hall of Fame in 2021.

In honor of his 50th anniversary with Mattel, a line of Hot Wheels toys, "Larry's Garage," was released.

Most recently, he was inducted into the Automotive Hall of Fame in Dearborn, Michigan, in 2023 in honor of 50 years of designing Hot Wheels cars.

== Pop culture ==
The Ramblin' Wrecker, a 1975 Hot Wheels tow truck, originally featured Larry Wood's home telephone number on the side of its bed. Later versions omitted this number after the Wood family received hundreds of calls. Municipalities across the country with the same number also received calls asking for "Larry's Towing", forcing Mattel to remove the number.

Wood appears on the show "Junkyard Empire" on the Discovery Channel. The episode features a full-size tow truck, built to replicate the Ramblin Wrecker Hot Wheel.

A huge fan of Don Prudhomme and Tom McEwen, Wood played an integral part in creating a successful partnership and sponsorship with the famous racing competitors, best known as the Snake and Mongoose. Wood's original artwork is featured in the 2013 movie Snake & Mongoose.

== Personal life ==
Wood was born and raised in Middletown, Connecticut. His mother was an artist who encouraged his design career. His father, a professor and coach at Wesleyan University, unknowingly sparked his son's car obsession when he confiscated a HOT ROD magazine from a player.

He graduated from the Art Center College of Design in Los Angeles, California.

Wood was recruited by Ford Motor Company in 1965, where he met his wife, Shirley.

He used to roll pennies down the hallway into her office where she worked as a secretary. They say it was, "Love at Ford Site."

Wood, a hot-rodder and car enthusiast, fills his days sketching, designing, and doing hands-on work with his car projects.
