= Don Wittman =

Canadian sportscaster (1936–2008)

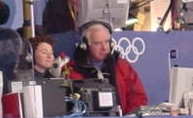
- Wittman broadcasting the 2002 Winter Olympics
- Born: Donald Rae Wittman; October 9, 1936; Herbert, Saskatchewan, Canada
- Died: January 19, 2008 (aged 71); Winnipeg, Manitoba, Canada
- Other name: Witt
- Occupation: CBC sportscaster

Donald Rae Wittman (October 9, 1936 – January 19, 2008) was a Canadian sportscaster.

== Early life and education ==
Born in Herbert, Saskatchewan, Wittman attended the University of Saskatchewan and got his start in the field of broadcasting as a news reporter with CFQC radio in Saskatoon in 1955.

== Career ==
Wittman began his long association with CBC Sports on January 1, 1961. He joined CBWT's supper-hour news program 24Hours in 1970 as sports anchor alternating with Bob Picken. He also worked on Winnipeg Jets television and radio broadcasts.

During the late 1970s and early 1980s, Wittman hosted Western Express, a half-hour weekly program broadcast in Western Canada that consisted of lottery ticket drawings for the lottery of the same name. The series format included Wittman co-hosting with media and community personalities from towns and cities across the region and conducting interviews between ticket drawings. (Western Express later changed its name to The Western and converted to a scratch-card lottery format).

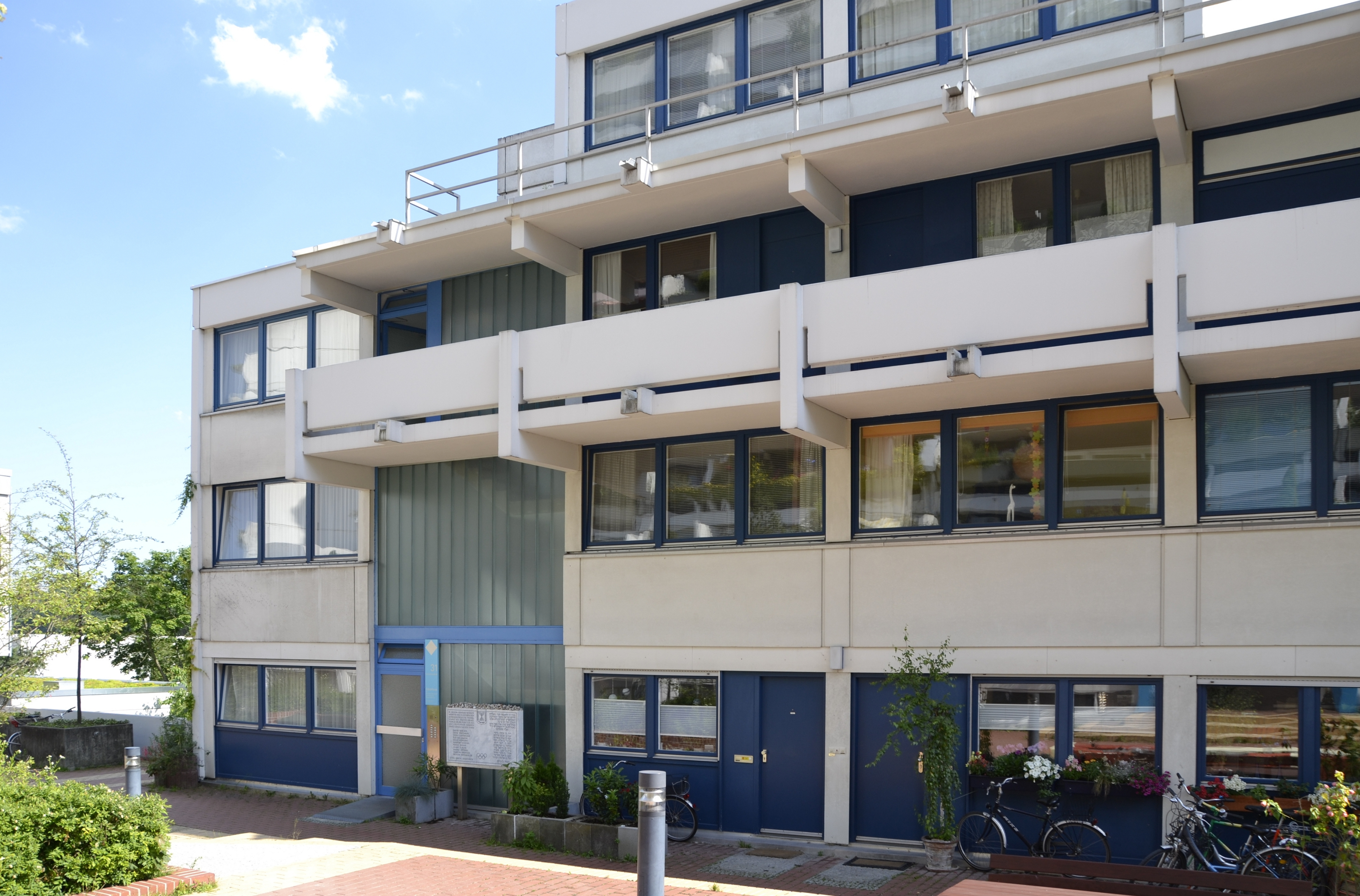
Israeli Olympic team's building in the Olympic Village

During the Munich massacre crisis at the 1972 Summer Olympics, Wittman and Bob Moir crawled through a hole in a fence to access the Olympic Village and give live reports, while posing as medical staff on the 1972 Canadian Olympic team. Wittman and Moir were 50 metres (160 ft) away from the Israeli Olympic team building, and could see the nine hostages sitting in a circle, guarded by the Palestinian terrorist group Black September. They filed radio reports to the CBC, and remained on location all day until the hostages were loaded onto a bus.

In a 1994 interview, Moir discussed the decision to sneak into the Olympic Village by saying,

"We were young and stupid, I guess. [Wittman] and I have always done things like that. We always went after the story."

As a sportscaster, Wittman covered many sports including athletics, baseball, basketball, golf, and was most known as a commentator and announcer for the CBC's CFL coverage, on Hockey Night in Canada, and for major Canadian and international curling tournaments.

Famous events covered by Wittman include Donovan Bailey's 100m sprint world record at the 1996 Summer Olympics and the infamous brawl between Canada and the Soviet Union at the 1987 World Junior Ice Hockey Championships.

== Death ==
On January 19, 2008, Wittman died as a result of cancer in a Winnipeg hospital surrounded by his family. He was seventy-one years old, survived by his wife, Judy, two daughters, Karen and Kristen and a son, David.

== Awards ==
Wittman won two ACTRA awards, was named Broadcaster of the Year by Sports Media Canada in 2002, and named to the Canadian Curling Hall of Fame in 2003. He was inducted into the CBC Sports Hall of Fame in January 2008. Wittman is an "Honoured Member" of the Manitoba Hockey Hall of Fame. He was inducted into the Canadian Football Hall of Fame in 1990.

== Further listening ==
- "Munich 1972: Encounter with terror". CBC Archives. CBC Radio. August 1, 1984.

Preceded by None	CBC Television Lead Curling announcer 1961–1968	Succeeded by Don Chevrier
Preceded by Don Chevrier	CBC Television Lead Curling announcer 1983–2006	Succeeded by Bruce Rainnie
Preceded by Bob Cole	Stanley Cup Final Canadian network television play-by-play announcer 1985–1986 (Wittman called games in Edmonton in 1985 and games Calgary in 1986 on CBC	Succeeded by Bob Cole
