= Nancy Lee (producer) =

Canadian broadcast sports journalist and producer

Nancy Lee is a Canadian broadcast sports journalist and producer. Formerly associated with CBC Sports, where she was appointed executive director in 2000, she resigned in 2006 to become the director of broadcast services for the 2010 Winter Olympics in Vancouver.

Lee first joined the CBC in 1987, becoming the first woman to work as a full-time national sports reporter on CBC Radio. She later became a producer of The Inside Track, and was head of the radio network's sports division from 1994 to 1996. She then became deputy head of CBC Television sports from 1996 to 2000.

In 2002, Lee became the first woman to lead a North American broadcast network's negotiating team for the acquisition of a top sports property, when the network renegotiated its contract with the National Hockey League.
