= Gordon Craig (sports executive) =

Canadian sport and television executive

Gordon Craig CM (born c. 1936) is a Canadian sport and television executive. He is the founder of The Sports Network and Réseau des sports and an inducted member of the Canadian Football Hall of Fame and Canadian Curling Hall of Fame. In 2020, Craig was named one of the 50 most influential Toronto sporting figures of the past 50 years by Steve Simmons and received the Brian Williams Media Award from the Ontario Sports Hall of Fame.

== Early life ==
Craig was born in 1936 in Brandon, Manitoba. Growing up, he was encouraged by his parents to enrol at United College before transferring after one year to the University of Manitoba where he majored in geology.

== Career ==
Through a family connection, Craig accepted a mailroom position with the Canadian Broadcasting Corporation (CBC) in Manitoba in 1954. From there, he was promoted from delivering mail to hanging lights in the studios to working the camera as part of the Canadian Football League (CFL) crew. While with CBC, Craig planned and produced TV coverage for the 1976 Summer Olympics in Montreal and the Russia-Canada hockey tours in 1972 and 1974. During the 1976 Olympics, Craig convinced senior management to cover the events 24/7, only breaking for news coverage, which eventually become the standard for all future Olympic coverage.

TSN's original logo, used from launch until 2001.

Craig eventually left his position as director of operations for CBC English-language radio and TV in 1983 to become the president of Action Canada Sports Network. His appointment was made in an effort to create the first sporting network television channel. On September 1, 1984, he launched The Sports Network (TSN), a 24-hour-a-day all sports channel on a discretionary user-pay basis. Craig stated that TSN was not licensed to compete with CBC and CTV; it was licensed to complement them. They signed the Toronto Blue Jays to an exclusive package on TSN in 1984 and followed this up with a Montreal Expos package. They also supported the Special Olympics and provided coverage of the events.

From there, TSN proved to be a success, with the network gaining more than one million Canadian subscribers between 1984 and 1987. The Bureau of Broadcast Measurement found that more viewers watched TSN in the three-month period starting in January than any other pay-TV network. In 1988, TSN became the first cable specialty service to cover the Olympic games. As a result of his success, Craig was considered as a possible replacement for Douglas Mitchell as the new commissioner of the CFL. Although he was not given the job, Craig was inducted into the Canadian Football Hall of Fame in recognition of his corporate support.

In 1995, Craig led a management consortium that won a bidding war to buy the broadcasting operations of John Labatt Ltd., which includes ESPN. With this new acquisition, Craig expanded TSN into a Montreal network. After selling NetStar to CTV Inc. in 2000, Gordon decided to retire.

=== Awards ===
He was the 1999 Academy Achievement Award recipient. In 2014, Craig was named to the Order of Canada for his "pioneering contributions to sports broadcasting and for his dedication to the Canadian television industry." In 2020, Craig was named one of the 50 most influential Toronto sporting figures of the past 50 years by Steve Simmons. He also received the Brian Williams Media Award from the Ontario Sports Hall of Fame.
