= Olympics on CBC commentators =

The following is a list of commentators to be featured in CBC Television's Olympic Games coverage.

== Hosts ==
Year	Prime-Time Host	Daytime Host(s)	Late-Night Host(s)	Cable Host(s)
1960 Summer	Doug Smith			
1964 Summer	Ted Reynolds			
1968 Summer	Lloyd Robertson			
1972 Summer	Lloyd Robertson			
1976 Summer	Lloyd Robertson; Ernie Afaganis			
1984 Summer	Brian Williams	John Wells		
1988 Summer	Brian Williams	Ron MacLean	Terry Leibel	
1992 Winter	Brian Williams	Ron MacLean	Terry Leibel	
1992 Summer	Brian Williams	Ron MacLean	Terry Leibel	
1996 Summer	Brian Williams	Ron MacLean	Terry Leibel	
1998 Winter	Brian Williams	Ron MacLean	Terry Leibel	Dave Randorf (on TSN)
2000 Summer	Brian Williams	Ron MacLean	Terry Leibel	Dave Randorf (on TSN)
2002 Winter	Brian Williams	Ron MacLean	Terry Leibel	Dave Randorf (on TSN)
2004 Summer	Brian Williams	Ron MacLean	Terry Leibel	Dave Randorf (on TSN)
2006 Winter	Brian Williams	Ron MacLean	Terry Leibel	Dave Randorf (on TSN)
2008 Summer	Ron MacLean	Scott Russell; Diana Swain	Ian Hanomansing	Dave Randorf (on TSN)
2014 Winter	Ron MacLean	Scott Russell; Diana Swain; David Amber	Andrew Chang; Andi Petrillo	
2016 Summer	Scott Russell	Ron MacLean; Andi Petrillo; David Amber	Scott Russell	
2018 Winter	Scott Russell	Andi Petrillo; Alexandre Despatie	Craig McMorris; Kelly VanderBeek	
2020 Summer	Scott Russell	Andi Petrillo (Morning); Perdita Felicien; Andrew Chang	Alexandre Despatie; Heather Hiscox	
2022 Winter	Scott Russell	Andi Petrillo (Morning); Perdita Felicien; Andrew Chang		Harnarayan Singh, P. J. Stock, Hailey Salvian (CBC/TSN/SNET (Hockey Show))
2024 Summer	Host: Andi Petrillo; Panelists: Perdita Felicien, Craig McMorris, Waneek Horn-Miller	Anastasia Bucsis and Rob Pizzo (Morning); Scott Russell and Julie Stewart-Binks (Daytime)		
2026 Winter	Anastasia Bucsis and Craig McMorris	Ron MacLean and Perdita Felicien (Morning); Andi Petrillo (Daytime)		

Ted Reynolds joined the CBC in 1956 and covered numerous sports and events, notably the Olympic Games, Commonwealth Games, Pan American Games and Grey Cup. He provided commentary for 23 sports and 10 Olympiads.

CBC's 1968 Summer Olympic host Lloyd Robertson was praised by The Globe and Mail writer Leslie Millin for his cool demeanour in the face of many technical glitches including "strange breaks, noises, lapses and unscheduled fade-outs." Millin applauded Robertson, normally a newscaster, for "working with the grace and agility of a man hired to stamp grapes in a Sicilian winery."

Brian Williams was the principal studio anchor for CBC's Olympic Games coverage for the 1984 Winter, 1984 Summer, 1988 Winter, 1988 Summer, 1992 Winter, 1996 Summer, 1998 Winter, 2000 Summer, 2002 Winter, 2004 Summer and 2006 Winter Olympics.

Terry Leibel became the first woman to co-host CBC Sports Olympic coverage during the 1996 Summer Olympic Games in Atlanta, Georgia. She also covered the 2002 and 2006 Winter Olympic Games and the 2004 Summer Olympic Games. She earned Gemini Award nominations for her work in the Atlanta and Sydney Olympics and won a 2003 Gemini Award becoming the first female sports broadcaster to do so. She was also the first woman to do play-by-play for the Olympics, handling cycling, equestrian and white-water events for NBC Sports during the Summer Games in Barcelona in 1992.

Scott Russell was the network's top broadcaster for gymnastics and has covered them at the Olympic Games of 1996, 2000, 2004, 2008*, 2012, 2016, and 2020 (delayed by the Covid-19 pandemic until 2021), the 1994 Commonwealth Games and the 1999 Pan American Games. (* - He was the host for the second half of the 2008 Summer Olympics, since the previous host, Ron MacLean's. mother died).

Dave Randorf hosted TSN's coverage of the 2000 Summer Olympics, 2002 Winter Olympics, 2004 Summer Olympics, and 2010 Winter Olympics. Working for Canada's Olympic Broadcast Media Consortium, Randorf co-hosted the CTV Olympic Morning block during the 2012 Summer Olympics.

Alexandre Despatie joined the broadcast team for Canada's French-language television coverage of the 2010 Olympic Winter Games in Vancouver during a brief break from training for the 2012 Games. He co-anchored the coverage of the opening and closing ceremonies alongside legendary Quebec hockey commentators Richard Garneau and Pierre Houde, narrated numerous athlete profiles, and took viewers on a tour of Granville Island, where many francophone musicians performed during the Olympics.

Kelly VanderBeek worked as an analyst/host during the Vancouver Olympics and London Olympics for CTV, continuing with the Sochi Olympics with CBC. She hosted the Raising an Olympian features and was a part of the PrimeTime Panel discussing hot topics from the day in sport. She has also worked as a guest host for Sportsnet, CBC, and Sportscene. In 2018, Vanderbeek provided daily CBC Olympic Overnight Show co-host duties, alongside Craig McMorris at the PyeongChang Winter Olympics.

Craig McMorris has worked as an analyst for the CBC since 2014, providing snowboarding commentary at the 2014 Winter Olympics, 2018 Winter Olympics, and the 2022 Winter Olympics. He served as cultural content for the 2016 Summer Olympics in Rio de Janeiro, and he also worked as a commentator for the CBC at the 2020 Summer Olympics, covering skateboarding in its Olympic debut.

Andi Petrillo anchored CBC's coverage of the 2014 Winter Olympics in Sochi Russia. On October 24, 2015, CBC Sports launched a new show, Road to the Olympic Games, which Petrillo co-hosted with veteran sportscaster Scott Russell. CBC owns the Olympic rights in Canada until the 2032 Games, and the show features elite high-performance athletes. Andrew Chang was also a part of CBC's broadcast team for the 2014 Winter Olympics.

In 2018, Perdita Felicien joined the CBC TV network broadcasting the Winter Olympics in Pyeongchang in South Korea and later the Tokyo Olympics (2021).

== By event ==
=== Winter Olympics ===
==== 1992 ====
Sport	Play-by-play	Colour commentator
Alpine skiing		
Biathlon		
Cross country skiing		
Figure skating	Chris Cuthbert	Paul Martini and Barbara Underhill
Men's hockey	Don Wittman	Jim Peplinski
Ski jumping		
Speed skating	Steve Armitage	

Steve Armitage reported on and hosted Hockey Night in Canada broadcasts for the Vancouver Canucks for nearly 30 years, the Canadian Football League and Grey Cup for 30 years, the Olympics including speed skating, swimming and diving, and the World Cup. Armitage was laid off by the CBC in August 2014 due to cuts to sports programming and the loss of hockey coverage to Rogers Media. He did, however, return to work for CBC at the 2018 and 2022 Olympics to call events such as long track speed skating. Armitage announced his retirement at the conclusion of the 2022 Winter Olympics.

==== 1998 ====
Sport	Play-by-play	Colour commentator
Alpine skiing	Scott Oake	Kerrin Lee Gartner
Biathlon	Scott Russell	Jack Sasseville
Cross country skiing	Scott Russell	Jack Sasseville
Curling	Don Wittman	Don Duguid
Figure skating	Chris Cuthbert	Paul Martini; Barbara Underhill; Sandra Bezic
Freestyle Skiing	Tom Harrington	Anna Fraser-Sproule
Men's hockey	Bob Cole; Mark Lee	Harry Neale; John Garrett
Women's hockey	Mark Lee	Margot Page
Ski jumping	Brenda Irving	Ron Richards
Snowboarding	Brenda Irving	Rob Stevens
Speed skating	Steve Armitage	Cathy Allinger
Luge	Mark Connolly	Chris Wightman
Bobsleigh	Mark Connolly	Clark Flynn

Bob Cole's work during CBC's broadcasts of the Olympic ice hockey have also become memorable among legions of Canadians. His call on the final shot of the shootout in the semi-final game of the 1998 Winter Olympics at Nagano between Canada and the Czech Republic represented Canada's then-ongoing failure at the games and haunted fans for the next four years. With Canada scoreless in the shootout and Brendan Shanahan representing their last chance, Cole said in a panicked voice as Shanahan skated in towards Czech goalie Dominik Hasek, "He's gotta score, that's all!" But Shanahan was stopped by Hasek, prompting Cole to dejectedly say "No, he can't do it."

At the gold medal game of the 2002 Winter Olympics in Salt Lake City between Canada and the United States, Cole's animated call of Joe Sakic's second goal of the game is also one of his more memorable moments. Also, when Jarome Iginla scored Canada's fourth goal of the game, with four minutes remaining in the third period, Cole was so excited when the goal was scored he yelled out "GORE!" (a hybrid of "goal" and "score"), and then proceeded to call out "Goal, Canada! Goal! Wow! A lot of Canadian fans here! The place goes crazy here in Salt Lake City, and I guess coast to coast in Canada, and all around the world!" When Sakic scored Canada's fifth goal with 1:20 remaining, Cole yelled out "Scores! Joe Sakic scores! And that makes it 5–2 Canada! Surely, that's gotta be it!" As the final seconds of the game ticked away, and as the crowd broke out in perfect unison singing "O Canada", Cole said, "Now after 50 years, it's time for Canada to stand up and cheer. Stand up and cheer everybody! The Olympics Salt Lake City, 2002, men's ice hockey, gold medal: Canada!"

With an average Canadian audience of 10.6 million viewers, that game was the most-watched CBC Sports program, beating the previous record of 4.957 million viewers for game seven of the 1994 Stanley Cup Final (the final game of the 1972 Summit Series between an NHL all-star team and the Soviet Union, which had been the most-watched sports program Canadian television history, was simulcast on CBC and CTV while Cole called the game on CBC Radio), in which the New York Rangers won their first Stanley Cup in 54 years, beating the Vancouver Canucks, another moment Cole himself called: "Here comes the faceoff and blare it Manhattan! The New York Rangers have done it here on a hot June night in New York! The Rangers are Stanley Cup Champions!"

Harry Neale began working as a broadcaster full-time in 1986, where he was teamed with play-by-play man Bob Cole on CBC. Together, the pair broadcast 20 Stanley Cup Finals, the 1998, 2002, 2006 Winter Olympics, the 1996 World Cup of Hockey, and 2004 World Cup of Hockey for CBC. At the gold medal game of the 2002 Winter Olympics in Salt Lake City between Canada and the United States, after Joe Sakic scored Canada's fifth goal with 1:20 remaining, he replied to his partner, Bob Cole's call as, "That's more than enough. Take a look at the Canadian bench. If you doubt by what I say, that's more than enough."

Sandra Bezic served as a commentator for NBC during the 2002, 2006, 2010, and 2014 Olympic games, the World Figure Skating Championships during the early 1990s, and numerous other skating events broadcast by NBC and CBC over the years.

Don Duguid also provided curling commentary for NBC at the 2002 Winter Olympics in Salt Lake City and the 2006 Winter Olympics in Turin with Don Chevrier, and with Andrew Catalon and Colleen Jones at the 2010 Winter Olympics in Vancouver.

==== 2002 ====
Sport	Play-by-play	Colour commentator
Alpine skiing	Scott Oake	Kerrin Lee-Gartner
Bobsleigh; Skeleton	Mark Connolly	David MacEachern
Cross country skiing Biathlon	Scott Russell	Jack Sasseville
Curling	Don Wittman	Mike Harris and Joan McCusker
Figure skating	Chris Cuthbert	Paul Martini and Barbara Underhill
Freestyle skiing	Vic Rauter	Anna Fraser-Sproule
Men's hockey	Bob Cole; Chris Cuthbert; Mark Lee	Harry Neale; Greg Millen
Women's hockey	Mark Lee	Margot Page
Luge	Mark Connolly	Chris Wightman
Ski jumping	Mark Connolly	Ron Richards
Snowboarding	Brenda Irving	Rob Stevens
Speed skating	Steve Armitage	Neal Marshall

==== 2006 ====
Sport	Play-by-play	Colour commentator	Reporter
Alpine skiing	Scott Oake	Kerrin Lee-Gartner	Mark Kelley
Biathlon	Scott Russell	Jack Sasseville	
Bobsleigh; Skeleton	Mark Connolly	Dave MacEachern	
Cross country skiing	Scott Russell	Jack Sasseville	Mark Kelley
Curling	Don Wittman	Mike Harris and Joan McCusker	Bruce Rainnie (semis & finals)
Figure skating	Mark Lee	Paul Martini and Barbara Underhill	
Freestyle skiing	Brenda Irving	Veronica Brenner	Mark Kelley
Men's hockey	Bob Cole; Jim Hughson	Harry Neale; Greg Millen	Elliotte Friedman
Women's hockey	Bruce Rainnie	Margot Page	Elliotte Friedman
Luge	Mark Connolly	Chris Wightman	
Short track	Steve Armitage	Catriona Le May Doan	
Ski jumping	Scott Russell	John Heilig	
Snowboarding	Brenda Irving	Tara Teigan	Mark Kelley
Speed skating	Steve Armitage	Catriona Le May Doan	

Since joining CBC Sports, Bruce Rainnie has broadcast four Olympic games (2000, 2002, 2004, & 2006). In 2006, he called the gold medal performance of the Canadian Women's Hockey team. Also in 2006, Rainnie was first on the scene to interview Brad Gushue after his rink won gold in Men's Curling. In 2007, Rainnie replaced the retiring Don Wittman as CBC's lead curling commentator.

A six-time medalist at the Canadian Championships, Brian Stemmle currently works as a television colour commentator for Rogers Sportsnet. He worked for CBC during the Olympics in 2006 and was the lead commentator for Alpine Skiing at the 2010 Winter Olympics in Vancouver/Whistler.

==== 2014 ====
Sport	Play-by-play	Colour commentator	Reporter
Alpine skiing	Scott Oake	Kerrin Lee-Gartner	
Biathon	Jack Sasseville	Beckie Scott	
Bobsleigh; Skeleton	Mark Connolly	Helen Upperton	
Cross country skiing	Karin Larsen	Jack Sasseville	
Curling	Bruce Rainnie	Mike Harris and Joan McCusker	Colleen Jones
Figure skating	Brenda Irving	Kurt Browning and Carol Lane	
Freestyle skiing	Mitch Peacock	Jeff Bean; Jennifer Heil (moguls)	
Men's hockey	Jim Hughson	Craig Simpson and Glenn Healy	Elliotte Friedman
Women's hockey	Mark Lee	Cassie Campbell-Pascall	Jennifer Botterill
Luge	Mark Connolly	Jeff Christie	
Short track	Steve Armitage	Kristina Groves	
Ski jumping	Scott Oake	Rob Keith	
Snowboarding	Rob Snoek	Craig McMorris	
Speed skating	Steve Armitage	Kristina Groves	

At the 2006 Torino Olympics, Colleen Jones did CBC segments about curling. Jones provided curling commentary for NBC's coverage of the 2010 Winter Olympics in Vancouver. She served as the sideline reporter for the curling events at the 2014, 2018 and 2022 Winter Olympics.

Craig McMorris has worked as an analyst for the CBC since 2014, providing snowboarding commentary at the 2014 Winter Olympics, 2018 Winter Olympics, and the 2022 Winter Olympics. He served as cultural content for the 2016 Summer Olympics in Rio de Janeiro, and he also worked as a commentator for the CBC at the 2020 Summer Olympics, covering skateboarding in its Olympic debut.

==== 2018 ====
Sport	Play-by-play announcer	Colour commentator	Reporter
Alpine skiing	Doug Dirks	Todd Brooker; Kerrin Lee-Gartner	Brian Stemmle
Biathlon	Nigel Reed	Justin Wadsworth	
Bobsleigh	Mark Connolly	Helen Upperton	Karina LeBlanc
Skeleton	Mark Connolly	Jon Montgomery	Karina LeBlanc
Cross country skiing	Nigel Reed	Beckie Scott and Justin Wadsworth	
Curling	Bruce Rainnie	Mike Harris and Joan McCusker	Colleen Jones
Figure skating	Brenda Irving	Kurt Browning and Carol Lane	Paul Martini
Freestyle skiing	Matt Cullen	Mike Atkinson (slopestyle); Deidra Dionne (aerials); Jennifer Heil (moguls); Ashleigh McIvor (ski cross); TJ Schiller (halfpipe)	
Men's hockey	Chris Cuthbert	Ray Ferraro; Craig Button; P.J. Stock; Alexei Yashin	Rob Pizzo and Cheryl Pounder
Women's hockey	Mark Lee	Cassie Campbell-Pascall	Rob Pizzo and Cheryl Pounder
Luge	Mark Connolly	Jeff Christie	Karina LeBlanc
Short track	Mitch Peacock	Michael Gilday	Charlsie Agro
Ski jumping	Signa Butler	Rob Keith	
Snowboarding	Rob Snoek	Adam Higgins; Craig McMorris	
Speed skating	Steve Armitage	Kristina Groves	Charlsie Agro

Todd Brooker has been a ski commentator on television for a number of years, and has worked for most of the major networks in North America. He has covered alpine skiing for numerous Winter Olympics for U.S. television, and currently provides commentary and analysis on CBC in Canada during the World Cup ski season. Brooker covered alpine skiing at the 2010 Winter Olympics for NBC in the United States.

Cheryl Pounder was a colour commentator for the CBC coverage of the women's hockey tournament at the 2014, 2018, and 2022 Winter Olympics. She also served as a colour commentator for the TSN's coverage of IIHF World Women's Championship hockey tournaments and succeeded Ray Ferraro as NHL 24 color commentator.

==== 2022 ====
Sport	Play-by-play announcer	Colour commentator	Reporter
Alpine skiing	Matt Cullen	Brian Stemmle	Kelly VanderBeek
Biathlon	Karin Larsen	Roddy Ward	
Bobsleigh	Mark Lee	Helen Upperton	Marivel Taruc
Luge	Mark Lee	Arianne Jones	Marivel Taruc
Skeleton	Mark Lee	Cassie Hawrysh	Marivel Taruc
Cross-country skiing	Nigel Reed	Beckie Scott	
Curling	Bruce Rainnie	Mike Harris and Joanne Courtney	Colleen Jones
Figure skating	Brenda Irving	Kurt Browning; Carol Lane; Kaetlyn Osmond; Meagan Duhamel; Tessa Virtue; Scott Moir	Elladj Baldé
Freestyle skiing	Claire Hanna (Aerials); Signa Butler (Big Air, Moguls, Halfpipe); Mike Atkinson (Slopestyle); Peter Ruttgaizer (Ski cross)	Deidra Dionne (Aerials); Mike Atkinson (Moguls and Halfpipe); Alex Beaulieu-Marchand (Big Air and Slopestyle); Kelsey Serwa (Ski cross)	Alison Chiasson
Men's Hockey	Chris Cuthbert	Mike Johnson	Rob Pizzo; James Duthie (host)
Women's Hockey	Bryan Mudryk	Cheryl Pounder	Kenzie Lalonde; Kate Beirness (host)
Nordic combined	Lance Winn	Rob Keith	
Ski jumping	Lance Winn	Rob Keith	
Snowboarding	Rob Snoek (Big Air, Halfpipe, Slopestyle); Peter Ruttgaizer (PGS and SBX)	Craig McMorris (Big Air, Halfpipe, Slopestyle); Adam Higgins(PGS and SBX)	Alison Chiasson (Halfpipe and Slopestyle)
Speed skating	Steve Armitage	Kristina Groves	Anastasia Bucsis
Short track speed skating	Mitch Peacock	Michael Gilday	Roseline Filion

Anastasia Bucsis has been CBC's Long Track speed skating analyst since 2018. She has also hosted digital shows for CBC during the Tokyo 2020 Olympics as well as the Beijing 2022 Winter Olympics.

==== 2026 ====
Sport	Play-by-play announcer	Colour commentator	Reporter
Alpine skiing	Brian Stemmle	Erin Mielzynski	Kelly VanderBeek; Olivier Pellerin
Bobsleigh	Mark Lee	Helen Upperton	Rob Pizzo
Curling	Bruce Rainnie	Jennifer Jones; Joanne Courtney; Mike Harris	Bryan Mudryk
Figure Skating	Brenda Irving	Carol Lane; Kurt Browning; Sandra Bezic	Devin Heroux
Freestyle Skiing	Alexandre Despatie (Aerials/Moguls); Mike Atkinson (Big Air/Halfpipe/Slopestyle); Daniella Ponticelli (Ski cross)	Deidra Dionne (Aerials); Philippe Marquis (Moguls); Kaya Turski (Big Air/Halfpipe/Slopestyle); Kelsey Serwa (Ski cross)	Antoine Deshaies; Antoni Nerestant
Men's Hockey	Chris Cuthbert; Matt Cullen	Mike Johnson; Becky Kellar	Kyle Bukauskas
Women's Hockey	Kenzie Lalonde; Daniella Ponticelli	Cheryl Pounder; Becky Kellar	Claire Hanna
Long Track Speed Skating	Signa Butler	Anastasia Bucsis	Omar Dabaghi-Pacheco
Short Track Speed Skating	Signa Butler	Michael Gilday	Devin Heroux
Skeleton	Mark Lee	Mellisa Hollingsworth	Rob Pizzo
Snowboarding	Rob Snoek (Big Air/Halfpipe/Slopestyle); Matt Cullen (PGS/SBX)	Craig McMorris (Big Air/Halfpipe/Slopestyle); Adam Higgins (PGS/SBX)	Antoni Nerestant

- Men's Hockey Studio Panel: James Duthie, Cassie Campbell-Pascall, Cheryl Pounder, Elliotte Friedman & Kevin Bieksa
- Women's Hockey Studio Panel: Andi Petrillo, Cassie Campbell-Pascall, Hailey Salvian and Saroya Tinker
- Contributors: Donnovan Bennett, Elladj Baldé, Ariel Helwani, Phylicia George, Cabbie Richards
- Digital Teams: Ariel Helwani, Julie Stewart-Binks, Mackenzie Barwell, Serena Aboud, Savanna Hamilton, Chris Jones (Feature writer)

=== Summer Olympics ===
==== 1960 ====
For the 1960 Summer Olympics in Rome, Italy, the CBC produced a total of 17 hours of radio and TV coverage. CBC Television broadcast same-day highlights each night. The half-hour package featured was provided by CBS Sports, which had the broadcast rights in the United States. CBS sportscasters Bud Palmer, Gil Stratton, and Bob Richards provided commentary. CBS sent videotapes of each day's events by jet to Idlewild Airport (now John F. Kennedy International Airport) in New York City, where a mobile transmission unit there beamed the pictures to the CBC and CBS networks. On radio, Ward Cornell and Thom Benson gave listeners 15-minute reports every evening except Sunday on the CBC's Trans-Canada Network and Doug Smith gave half-hour evening wrap-ups on the CBC's Dominion Network.

==== 1964 ====
The CBC Television broadcasters for the 1964 Summer games were Ted Reynolds, Dave Cruikshank, Bob McDevitt, Steve Douglas, and Lloyd Robertson. Ward Cornell, Al Hamel, Bob Moir, Don Goodwin, and Bill Good were the broadcasters for CBC Radio.

==== 1972 ====
During the Munich massacre crisis at the 1972 Summer Olympics, Don Wittman and Bob Moir crawled through a hole in a fence to access the Olympic Village and give live reports, while posing as medical staff on the 1972 Canadian Olympic team. Wittman and Moir were 50 metres (160 ft) away from the Israeli Olympic team building, and could see the nine hostages sitting in a circle, guarded by the Palestinian terrorist group Black September. They filed radio reports to the CBC, and remained on location all day until the hostages were loaded onto a bus.

In a 1994 interview, Moir discussed the decision to sneak into the Olympic Village by saying,

"We were young and stupid, I guess. [Wittman] and I have always done things like that. We always went after the story."

==== 1976 ====
Sport	Play-by-play
Basketball	
Boxing	
Cycling	
Canoeing	
Diving	Irene MacDonald
Gymnastics	
Rowing	
Swimming	
Track and field	
Volleyball	Vic Lindal
Equestrian	
Field Hockey	
Soccer	Graham Leggat
Weightlifting	
Wrestling	Brian Williams

Vic Lindal was a colour commentator in the Sport of Volleyball at four Olympic Games; Montreal, Quebec in 1976 with CBC, Los Angeles, USA in 1984 with CBC, Seoul, Korea in 1988 with CBC, and Barcelona in 1992 with CTV.

Graham Leggat began a second career as an analyst on soccer telecasts for the CBC at the 1976 Summer Olympics and at the World Cup.

Bob Moir was the executive producer for coverage of the 1976 Summer Olympics hosted in Montreal. He envisioned expanded coverage of the Olympics, despite criticism of CBC Sports for spending money from taxpayers to do so. He toured Canada to explain the project and boasted that, "the biggest team in Montreal will be the CBC team ... it will be bigger than the [1976] Canadian Olympic team". His crew for the English-language coverage of the Olympics included 245 people who produced 169 hours of content, compared to 14 hours of content at the 1972 Olympics.

The 1976 Summer Olympics gave CBC Sports hosts their first chance to speak with athletes immediately following events, when Moir had a studio constructed for live televised interviews. When multiple events were held simultaneously, Moir had 20 videotape machines in use to record an event to air at a later time. When Poland played Russia for the gold medal in volleyball, Olympic coverage was extended to show the game to its conclusion, which delayed airing of The National news program by 35 minutes. During the Olympics, Moir had a telephone hotline to CBC director of operations Gordon Craig to discuss airtime, and later commented that he felt a "sense of power" when the news was delayed.

In reference to audience measurement ratings in Canada, Moir felt that "the Montreal Olympics was the impetus for what you see today". He also felt that the model used to cover the 1976 Summer Olympics set the standard used by CBC Sports for future live coverage of the Olympics, and stated that the CBC has not lost money covering an Olympics since 1976.

==== 1984 ====
Sport	Play-by-play	Colour commentator
Basketball	Brian Heaney	
Boxing	Vic Rauter	Peter Wylie
Cycling	Gordon Singleton	Greg Rokosh
Canoeing	John Wood	
Diving	Irene MacDonald	
Gymnastics	Ernie Afaganis	Keith Russell; Kathy Stoesz; Kaarina Dillabough
Rowing		
Swimming	Ted Reynolds	Byron MacDonald; Mary Ann Reeves
Tennis		
Track and field	Don Wittman	Geoff Gowan
Volleyball	Vic Lindal	
Equestrian	Terry Leibel	
Field Hockey	Judy McCrae	
Soccer	Graham Leggat	
Weightlifting	Aldo Roy	
Wrestling	Ole Sorensen	

Byron MacDonald has also acted as a commentator for swimming events; he was a two-time recipient of the Gemini Award for Best Sports Play-by-Play or Analyst in recognition of his swimming analysis on CBC at the 2004 and 2008 Summer Olympics.

During the 2016 Summer Olympics, MacDonald attracted criticism for remarks on a hot mic that a swimmer in the women's 4 × 200 metre freestyle relay (which was implied to be a member of the Chinese team) had "dropped the ball", and that she "went out like stink, [and] died like a pig." MacDonald and the CBC later apologized for the remark, stating that he meant it as a description of her performance, and did not mean for it to be a personal attack.

==== 1988 ====
Sport	Play-by-play	Colour commentator
Baseball (demonstration sport)		
Basketball		Ron Lancaster
Boxing		Russ Anber
Canoeing		Sue Holloway (sprint)
Cycling		Ron Hayman
Diving		Irene MacDonald
Equestrian		Gail Greenough
Gymnastics		Elfi Schlegel
Hockey		Judy McCrae
Rowing		Pat Turner
Swimming	Steve Armitage	Alex Baumann; Byron MacDonald
Synchronized swimming	Chris Cuthbert	Sharon Hambrook
Tennis		Robert Bettauer
Track and field	Don Wittman	Geoff Gowan
Volleyball	Vic Lindal	
Wrestling		Ole Sorensen

Other Commentators: Ernie Afaganis, Ken Daniels, Colleen Jones, Scott Oake, Doug Saunders

CBC Television signed Ron Lancaster as a colour commentator on CFL broadcasts in 1980. He was part of a trio that included Don Wittman doing the play-by-play and former Argonaut head coach Leo Cahill doing colour commentary (Cahill left after the 1985 season). He was with the CBC from 1981 to 1990 and was a member of the CBC team at the 1988 Summer Olympics in Seoul, Korea as the play-by-play broadcaster for basketball.

==== 2000 ====
Sport	Play-by-Play	Colour commentator
Athletics	Don Wittman	Geoff Gowan and Michael Smith
Basketball	Paul Romanuk	Brian Heaney
Boxing	Scott Oake	Russ Anber
Canoe/Kayak	Chris Cuthbert	Scott Logan
Cycling	Mark Connolly	Curt Harnett
Diving	Steve Armitage	Mary Carroll
Equestrian	Jim Van Horne	Terry Leibel
Gymnastics	Scott Russell	Lori Strong-Ballard
Hockey	Vic Rauter	David Bissett
Rowing	Chris Cuthbert	Kay Worthington
Softball	Vic Rauter	Lori Sippel
Synchronized Swimming	Steve Armitage	Karin Larsen
Swimming	Steve Armitage	Byron MacDonald
Tennis	Jim Van Horne	
Triathlon	Don Wittman	Paul Regensburg
Volleyball	Mark Lee	Charles Parkinson
Water Polo	Jim Van Horne	Cindy Flett
Weightlifting	Bruce Rainnie	Aldo Roy
Wrestling	Bruce Rainnie	Chris Wilson

==== 2004 ====
Sport	Play-by-Play	Colour commentator	Reporter
Athletics	Don Wittman	Donovan Bailey; Steve Ovett; Michael Smith	Scott Oake
Baseball		Warren Sawkiw	
Basketball	Paul Romanuk	Jay Triano	
Boxing	Bruce Rainnie	Russ Anber	
Canoe	Chris Cuthbert	Scott Logan (Flatwater)	
Canoe		Claudia Kerckhoff van Wijk (slalom)	
Cycling	Mark Connolly	Curt Harnett; Lesley Tomlinson	
Diving	Steve Armitage	Mary Carroll	
Gymnastics	Scott Russell	Lori Strong-Ballard	
Judo		Andrée Clément	
Rowing	Chris Cuthbert	Marnie McBean	
Softball	Vic Rauter	Lori Sippel	
Swimming	Steve Armitage	Byron MacDonald; Mark Tewksbury	Scott Oake
Synchronized Swimming	Karin Larsen	Karen Clark Le Poole	
Tennis		Doug Adler	
Triathlon		Barrie Shepley	
Volleyball	Mark Lee	Charles Parkinson; Erminia Russo	
Water Polo		Waneek Horn-Miller	
Weightlifting		Aldo Roy	
Wrestling		Chris Wilson	

Other Commentators: Elliotte Friedman, Brenda Irving, Karin Larsen, Dan Pollard, Vic Rauter

==== 2008 ====
Sport	Play-by-Play	Colour commentator	Reporter
Athletics	Mark Lee; Elliotte Friedman	Michael Smith; David Moorcroft	Scott Oake
Synchronized Swimming	Karin Larsen	Karen Clark Le Poole	
Swimming	Steve Armitage	Byron MacDonald	Scott Oake
Diving	Steve Armitage	Anne Montminy	
Basketball	Paul Romanuk		
Baseball	Jim Van Horne	Warren Sawkiw	
Softball	Jim Van Horne	Hayley Wickenheiser	
Football	Nigel Reed	Jason DeVos	Erin Paul
Weightlifting	Nigel Reed	Aldo Roy	
Taekwondo	Nigel Reed	Tino Dossantos	
Gymnastics	Brenda Irving	Lori Strong-Ballard	
Rowing	Bruce Rainnie	Barney Williams	
Canoeing (flatwater)	Bruce Rainnie	Scott Logan	
Canoeing (slalom)	Doug Dirks	Claudia Kerckhoff-Van Wijk	
Volleyball	Doug Dirks	Charles Parkinson; Erminia Russo	
Boxing	Vic Rauter	Russ Anber	
Cycling	Mark Connolly	Clara Hughes (Track, Road Mountain); Kevin O'Brien (BMX)	
Water Polo	Rob Snoek; George Gross Jr.		
Field Hockey	Rob Snoek	Hari Kant	
Tennis	Karin Larsen	Michael T. Cvitkovic	
Triathlon	Karin Larsen	Barrie Shepley	
Wrestling	Karin Larsen	Chris Wilson	
Sailing	Peter Rusch	Fionia Kidd	
Equestrian	Nancy Wetmore	Beth Underhill (Show Jumping); Cara Whitham (Dressage)	Erin Paul
Judo	Jeff Marek		

Jim Van Horne has broadcast from five Olympic games, including 1988 in Calgary, covering alpine skiing, 2000 in Sydney covering tennis, 2008 in Beijing, assigned to baseball and softball, and 2010 Vancouver, mentoring the commentators from APTN, the Aboriginal Peoples Television Network, and worked in 2018 Pyeongchang on the worldwide live stream.

Karin Larsen's career in the media began in 1988 as a sports researcher for the Canadian Broadcasting Corporation, and since she began working as a sportscaster, she has been an announcer for six Olympic Games and four Paralympic Games, notably broadcasting the play-by-play for her own sister's silver medal performance in the 1996 Summer Olympics in Atlanta, Georgia. Larsen also announced for synchronised swimming for CBC Sports at the 2008 Summer Olympics in Beijing, China.

During his career, Scott Oake has covered a total of 12 Olympic games for the CBC, including the 2008 Beijing Games where he did play-by-play for flatwater canoeing and rowing events. Oake has covered downhill skiing at every Winter Olympics from Calgary in 1988 to Sochi in 2014.

After his retirement from competitive sport Rob Snoek moved into broadcasting as a play-by-play announcer for Ontario Hockey League games, first for the Oshawa Generals on CKDO, and later for Peterborough Petes games on CJMB-FM. He first joined the CBC's Olympic team in 2002, covering a variety of both main Olympic and Paralympic events.

For the 2008 Summer Olympics and 2016 Summer Olympics, Mark Lee covered the track and field events for CBC.

For the 2008 Beijing Summer Olympics, David Moorcroft provided track and field analysis for the Canadian Broadcasting Corporation. He commentated for Channel 4 at the 2011 World Athletics Championships. During the 2012 London Olympics he again served as a track and field analyst for Canadian television, this time for the CTV-led Olympic Broadcast Media Consortium. In 2016, he performed the same role for CBC/Radio-Canada's coverage of the Rio de Janeiro Olympic Games.

In May 2008, Anne Montminy did commentary for the CBC Television Network at the 2008 Beijing Olympics covering diving competitions.

Michael Smith works for CBC Television Sports and CTV Television as a color commentator for track and field events; in this capacity, he received a Canadian Screen Award nomination for Best Sports Analyst at the 10th Canadian Screen Awards as a commentator for CBC Television's coverage of the 2020 Summer Olympics.

==== 2016 ====
Sport	Play-by-Play Announcer	Colour commentator	Reporter
Athletics	Mark Lee	Michael Smith and David Moorcroft	Scott Oake
Basketball	Matt Devlin (Men); Bruce Rainnie (Women)	Jack Armstrong (Men); Chantal Vallée (Women)	
Beach Volleyball	Rob Snoek	Mark Heese	
Cycling	Mark Connolly (Track); Mitch Peacock (BMX); Doug Dirks (Mountain Biking)	Richard Wooles (Track); Kevin O'Brien (BMX); Lesley Tomlinson (Mountain Biking)	
Canoeing	Doug Dirks	Karen Furneaux	
Diving	Elliotte Friedman; Mark Lee (Synchronized Diving)	Blythe Hartley	Andrew Chang; David Amber
Equestrian	Bruce Rainnie	Ian Allison	
Football	Nigel Reed	Clare Rustad	
Gymnastics	Brenda Irving	Kyle Shewfelt	Andrew Chang
Rowing	Doug Dirks	Barney Williams	Karin Larsen
Rugby sevens	Mitch Peacock	Andrea Burk	
Swimming	Elliotte Friedman	Byron MacDonald	Andrew Chang; David Amber
Tennis	Rob Faulds	Robert Bettauer	
Triathlon	Brenda Irving	Barrie Shepley	
Volleyball	Charles Parkinson	Emily Cordonier and Paul Duerden	

Matt Devlin previously served as the play-by-play man for NBC Sports' coverage of Wrestling at the 2008 Summer Olympics.

During the 2012 London Olympics, Kyle Shewfelt served as a gymnastics analyst for the CTV Television Network-led Canadian Olympic Broadcast Media Consortium.

In 2016, Elliotte Friedman was a commentator during CBC's coverage of diving and swimming events at the 2016 Summer Olympics to replace Steve Armitage (who was unable to attend the Games due to his diagnosis with chronic heart failure).

Chantal Vallée has contributed as a colour commentator for basketball on prominent Canadian broadcasting channels, including CBC, CTV, Sportsnet, TSN, and RDS. Her extensive coverage encompasses significant sporting events such as the 2012, 2016 and 2020 Summer Olympics. and the 2019 NBA play-offs.

Clare Rustad has served as a soccer analyst on CBC, TSN and Sportsnet for events including the Pan Am Games, the FIFA Women's World Cup, and the 2020 Tokyo Olympics.

==== 2020 ====
Sport	Play-by-play announcers	Colour commentator	Reporter
Athletics	Mark Lee	Michael Smith and David Moorcroft	Devin Heroux; Rob Snoek
Basketball	Dan Shulman	Meghan McPeak	
Basketball	Peter Ruttgaizer (3x3)	Michael Linklater (3x3)	
Beach Volleyball	Claire Hanna	Mark Heese	
Canoeing	Matt Cullen (Slalom); Steve Armitage (Sprint)	Josh Hastings (Slalom); Karen Furneaux (Sprint)	
Cycling	Mark Connolly	Lesley Tomlinson (Road & Mountain Bike); Richard Wooles (Road & Track)	
Diving	Mitch Peacock	Blythe Hartley	
Equestrian	Bruce Rainnie	Deanna Phelan	
Field Hockey	Victor Findlay	Scott Sandison	
Football	Nigel Reed	Clare Rustad	
Golf	Doug Dirks		
Gymnastics (Artistic & Trampoline)	Brenda Irving	Kyle Shewfelt	
Judo	Karin Larsen	Josh Hagen	
Karate	Douglas Gelevan	Chris de Sousa Costa	
Marathons	Scott Russell	Krista DuChene	
Marathon Swimming	Signa Butler	Lisa Bentley	
Race Walks	Matt Cullen	Lisa Bentley	
Rowing	Steve Armitage	Adam Kreek	
Rugby Sevens	Nigel Reed	Andrea Burk and Phil Mackenzie	
Softball	Lance Winn	Alison Bradley	
Sport Climbing	Brenda Irving	Kimanda Jarzebiak	
Swimming	Rob Snoek	Byron MacDonald	Summer Mortimer
Tennis	Bruce Rainnie	Robert Bettauer	
Triathlon	Signa Butler	Barrie Shepley	
Volleyball	Rob Snoek	Paul Duerden	
Water Polo	Signa Butler	George Cross Jr.	
Wrestling	Karin Larsen	Carol Huynh	

Dan Shulman previously worked for CTV in its coverage of the 1994 Winter Olympics from Lillehammer, Norway, covering hockey, and the 1994 World Championships of Basketball.

==== 2024 ====
Sport	Play-by-play announcers	Colour commentator	Reporter
Athletics	Mark Lee	Michael Smith and David Moorcroft	Devin Heroux
Basketball	Dan Shulman	Meghan McPeak	Nabil Karim
Basketball	Daniella Ponticelli (3x3)	Michael Linklater (3x3)	
Beach Volleyball	Claire Hanna	Mark Heese	Omar Dabaghi-Pacheco
Breaking	Mark Strong	Adrian Bernard	Kelly VanderBeek
Canoeing	Elliotte Friedman (Sprint)	Andrea Proske (Sprint)	Kwabena Oduro
Cycling	Mark Connolly	Curt Harnett (Road); Barrie Shepley (Road & Track)	Michael Roy
Diving	Alexandre Despatie	Jennifer Abel	Antoni Nerestant
Football	Signa Butler	Clare Rustad	Christine Roger
Gymnastics (Artistic & Trampoline)	Brenda Irving	Kyle Shewfelt	Christine Gauthier
Judo		Josh Hagen	
Marathons	Brenda Irving	Krista DuChene	
Race Walks	Matt Cullen	Lisa Bentley	
Rowing	Elliotte Friedman	Andrea Proske	Kwabena Oduro
Skateboarding	Alexandre Despatie (Street); Rob Pizzo (Race)	Craig McMorris (Street and Race)	Kelly VanderBeek
Swimming	Rob Snoek	Byron MacDonald	Devin Heroux; Roseline Filion
Tennis	Bruce Rainnie	Sharon Fichman	Antoine Deshaies
Triathlon	Matt Cullen	Lisa Bentley and Barrie Shepley	
Volleyball	Signa Butler; Matt Cullen	Dallas Soonias	Alexandre Gascon
Water Polo	Matt Cullen	Waneek Horn-Miller	
Wrestling	Matt Cullen	Carol Huynh	Olivier Pellerin

== See also ==
- List of Canadian Broadcasting Corporation personalities
- List of Canadian sports personalities
