= Weightlifting at the 1964 Summer Olympics – Men's 56 kg =

Weightlifting at the Olympics

Men's 56 kg at the Games of the XVIII Olympiad
- Venue: Shibuya Public Hall
- Date: 11 October 1964
- Competitors: 24 from 18 nations
- Winning total: 357.5 kg WR

Medalists
| 1st place, gold medalist(s) | | Aleksey Vakhonin | Soviet Union |
| 2nd place, silver medalist(s) | | Imre Földi | Hungary |
| 3rd place, bronze medalist(s) | | Shiro Ichinoseki | Japan |

The men's 56 kg weightlifting competitions at the 1964 Summer Olympics in Tokyo took place on 11 October at the Shibuya Public Hall. It was the fifth appearance of the bantamweight class.

== Results ==
| Rank | Name | Country | kg |
|---|---|---|---|
| 1 | Aleksey Vakhonin | Soviet Union | 357.5 |
| 2 | Imre Földi | Hungary | 355.0 |
| 3 | Shiro Ichinoseki | Japan | 347.5 |
| 4 | Henryk Trębicki | Poland | 342.5 |
| 5 | Yang Mu-sin | South Korea | 340.0 |
| 6 | Yukio Furuyama | Japan | 335.0 |
| 7 | Yu In-ho | South Korea | 335.0 |
| 8 | Martin Dias | British Guiana | 335.0 |
| 9 | Róbert Nagy | Hungary | 330.0 |
| 10 | Ali Rajabi Eslami | Iran | 330.0 |
| 11 | Mohamed Herit | Egypt | 327.5 |
| 12 | Renzo Grandi | Italy | 327.5 |
| 13 | Fernando Báez | Puerto Rico | 322.5 |
| 14 | Mohon Lal Ghosh | India | 312.5 |
| 15 | Mohammad Nassiri | Iran | 310.0 |
| 16 | Chit Mya | Burma | 310.0 |
| 17 | Chua Phung Kim | Malaysia | 307.5 |
| 18 | Chaiya Sukchinda | Thailand | 302.5 |
| 19 | Hector Curiel | Netherlands Antilles | 300.0 |
| 20 | Muhammad Azam | Pakistan | 295.0 |
| 21 | Gerald Hay | Australia | 290.0 |
| 22 | Sam Coffa | Australia | 275.0 |
| AC | Chung Nan-fei | Chinese Taipei | 95.0 |
| AC | Sermbhan Chongrak | Thailand | 185.0 |
