= Weightlifting at the 1968 Summer Olympics – Men's 56 kg =

Weightlifting at the Olympics

Men's 56 kg at the Games of the XIX Olympiad
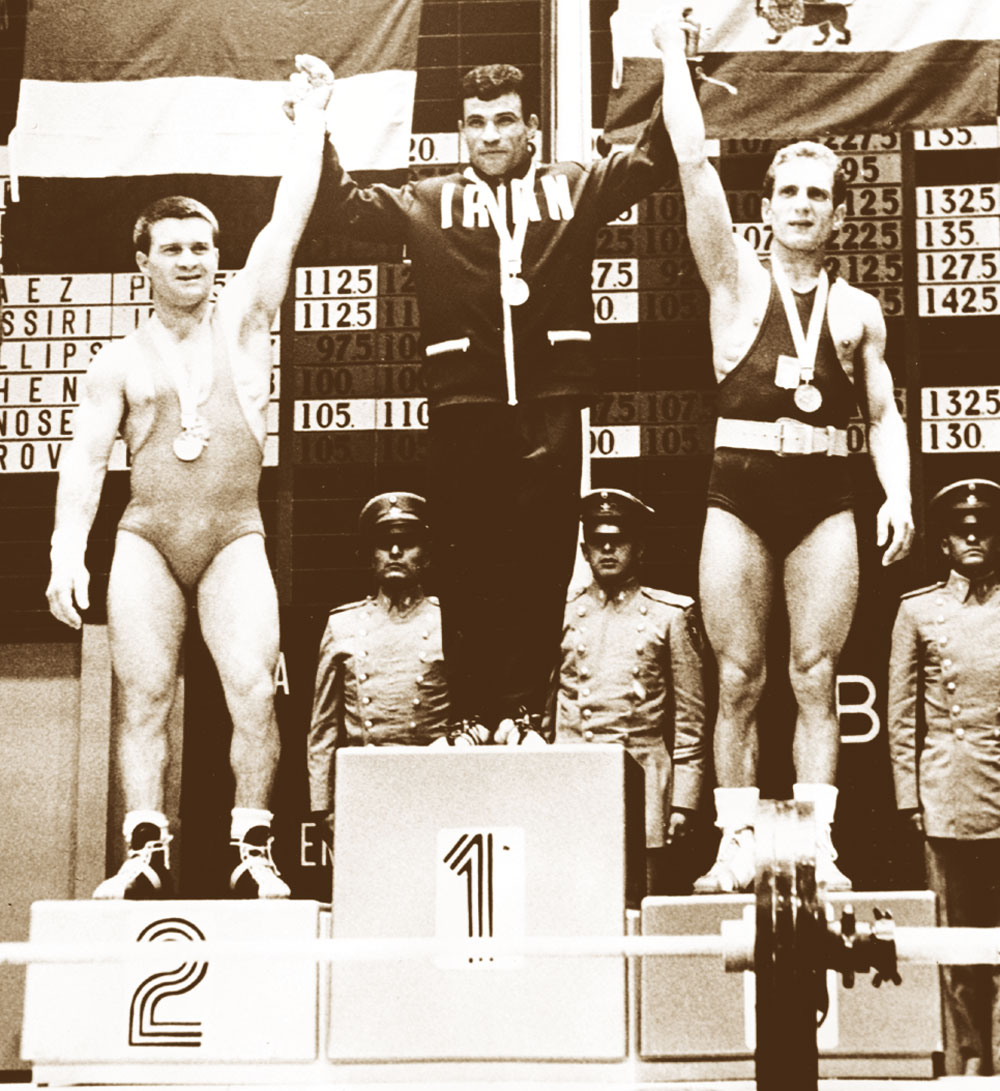
- The final podium. From left to right, Imre Földi, Mohammad Nassiri and Henryk Trębicki.
- Venue: Teatro de los Insurgentes
- Date: 13 October 1968
- Competitors: 20 from 19 nations
- Winning total: 367.5 kg WR

Medalists
1st place, gold medalist(s)		Mohammad Nassiri	Iran
2nd place, silver medalist(s)		Imre Földi	Hungary
3rd place, bronze medalist(s)		Henryk Trębicki	Poland

The men's 56 kg weightlifting competitions at the 1968 Summer Olympics in Mexico City took place on 13 October at the Teatro de los Insurgentes. It was the sixth appearance of the bantamweight class.

== Results ==
Rank	Name	Country	kg
1	Mohammad Nassiri	Iran	367.5
2	Imre Földi	Hungary	367.5
3	Henryk Trębicki	Poland	357.5
4	Gennady Chetin	Soviet Union	352.5
5	Shiro Ichinoseki	Japan	350.0
6	Fernando Báez	Puerto Rico	345.0
7	Atanas Kirov	Bulgaria	335.0
8	Chaiya Sukchinda	Thailand	330.0
9	Precious McKenzie	Great Britain	330.0
10	Kurt Pittner	Austria	322.5
11	Chun Hon Chan	Canada	310.0
12	Tung Chye Hong	Singapore	302.5
13	Alex Martínez	El Salvador	267.5
AC	Salvador del Rosario	Philippines	DNF
AC	Charlie Depthios	Indonesia	DNF
AC	Arturo Dandan	Philippines	DNF
AC	Guillermo Boyd	Panama	DNF
AC	Anthony Phillips	Barbados	DNF
AC	Chen Kue-sen	Chinese Taipei	DNF
AC	Mohamed Herit	Egypt	DNF
