= Weightlifting at the 1968 Summer Olympics – Men's 60 kg =

Weightlifting at the Olympics

Men's 60 kg at the Games of the XIX Olympiad
- Venue: Teatro de los Insurgentes
- Date: 14 October 1968
- Competitors: 28 from 22 nations
- Winning total: 392.5 kg

Medalists
1st place, gold medalist(s)		Yoshinobu Miyake	Japan
2nd place, silver medalist(s)		Dito Shanidze	Soviet Union
3rd place, bronze medalist(s)		Yoshiyuki Miyake	Japan

The men's 60 kg weightlifting competitions at the 1968 Summer Olympics in Mexico City took place on 14 October at the Teatro de los Insurgentes. It was the eleventh appearance of the featherweight class.

== Results ==
Rank	Name	Country	kg
1	Yoshinobu Miyake	Japan	392.5
2	Dito Shanidze	Soviet Union	387.5
3	Yoshiyuki Miyake	Japan	385.0
4	Jan Wojnowski	Poland	382.5
5	Mieczysław Nowak	Poland	375.0
6	Nasrollah Dehnavi	Iran	365.0
7	Yang Mu-sin	South Korea	365.0
8	Manuel Mateos	Mexico	360.0
9	Mladen Kuchev	Bulgaria	357.5
10	János Benedek	Hungary	355.0
11	Dieter Rauscher	West Germany	352.5
12	Ildefonso Lee	Panama	350.0
13	Madek Kasman	Indonesia	345.0
14	Enrique Hernández	Puerto Rico	345.0
15	Noe Rinonos	Philippines	342.5
16	Mohon Lal Ghosh	India	342.5
17	Pedro Serrano	Puerto Rico	322.5
18	Sanun Tiamsert	Thailand	320.0
19	Carlos Pérez	Nicaragua	302.5
20	Francisco Echevarría	Guatemala	277.5
AC	Ramón Silfa	Dominican Republic	177.5
AC	Chua Phung Kim	Singapore	DNF
AC	Petar Yanev	Bulgaria	DNF
AC	Chung Nan-fei	Chinese Taipei	DNF
AC	Chang Ming-chung	Chinese Taipei	DNF
AC	Gerald Perrin	Great Britain	DNF
AC	Miguel Angel Medina	Mexico	DNF
AC	Luís Paquete	Portugal	DNF
