= Par 27 =

Canadian sports television program

- Genre: Golf
- Presented by: Ernie Afaganis; Al Balding; Bob Panasik
- Country of origin: Canada
- Original language: English
- No. of seasons: 3

Production
- Producer: Dave Smiley
- Production location: Jasper, Alberta
- Running time: 30 minutes

Original release
- Network: CBC Television
- Release: 1 April 1978 – 22 November 1980

Par 27 is a Canadian sports television program that aired on CBC Television from 1978 to 1980.

== Premise ==
Each episode featured a contest between two golfers who each played nine balls towards a hole. Each shot was rated at par 3, thus the total of "Par 27" per player. Of the nine shots per player, three were from the tee, three were situated 50 yards from the green and the remaining three from a bunker. Al Balding and Bob Panasik provided commentary with host Ernie Afaganis.

== Scheduling ==
This half-hour program was broadcast on Saturday afternoons as follows:

| Season | Dates | | Time |
|---|---|---|---|
| 1 (1978) | 1 April | 23 September | 12:30 p.m. |
| 2 (1979) | 16 June | 22 September | 2:00 p.m. |
| 3 (1980) | 19 July | 22 November | 2:00 p.m. |

== See also ==
- Golf With Stan Leonard
- Tee to Green
