= Róbert Nagy =

Róbert Nagy may refer to:

- Róbert Nagy (cyclist) (born 1972), Slovak cyclist
- Róbert Nagy (footballer) (born 1987), Hungarian footballer
- Róbert Nagy (speedway rider) (born 1967), Hungarian motorcycle speedway rider
- Robert Nagy (tenor) (1929–2008), American opera singer
- Róbert Nagy (weightlifter) (born 1940), Hungarian weightlifter
- Robert Nagy (windsurfer) (born 1963), French windsurfer
