= Indonesia at the 1968 Summer Olympics =

- IOC code: INA
- NOC: Indonesian Olympic Committee

in Mexico City
- Competitors: 6 in 2 sports
- Medals: Gold 0 Silver 0 Bronze 0 Total 0

Summer Olympics appearances (overview)
- 1952; 1956; 1960; 1964; 1968; 1972; 1976; 1980; 1984; 1988; 1992; 1996; 2000; 2004; 2008; 2012; 2016; 2020; 2024

Indonesia competed at the 1968 Summer Olympics in Mexico City, Mexico.

== Competitors ==
The following is the list of number of competitors participating in the Games:

| Sport | Men | Women | Total |
|---|---|---|---|
| Sailing | 3 | 0 | 3 |
| Weightlifting | 3 | 0 | 3 |
| Total | 6 | 0 | 6 |

== Sailing ==
Men

| Athlete | Event | Race | | | | | | | Net points | Final rank |
| Athlete | Event | 1 | 2 | 3 | 4 | 5 | 6 | 7 | Net points | Final rank |
|---|---|---|---|---|---|---|---|---|---|---|
| Robert Lucas | Finn class | 30 | ~~DNF~~ | 31 | 35 | 34 | 30 | ~~DNF~~ | 272 | 35th place |
| John Gunawan; Tan Tjong Sian | Flying Dutchman class | 26 | 25 | 28 | ~~29~~ | 28 | 28 | 28 | 234 | 29th place |

== Weightlifting ==
| Athlete | Event | Military press | | Snatch | | Clean & Jerk | | Total | Rank |
| Athlete | Event | Result | Rank | Result | Rank | Result | Rank | Total | Rank |
|---|---|---|---|---|---|---|---|---|---|
| Charlie Depthios | Bantamweight | ~~97.5~~ | DNF | — | — | — | — | — | DNF |
| Madek Kasman | Featherweight | 105.0 | =15 | 100.0 | =13 | 140.0 | =6 | 345.0 | 13 |
| Irsan Husen | Light heavyweight | ~~140.0~~ | DNF | — | — | — | — | — | DNF |

== See also ==
- 1968 Paralympic Games
- Indonesia at the Olympics
- Indonesia at the Paralympics
