= Tee to Green =

Canadian TV program

- Genre: Sports education
- Presented by: Ernie Afaganis
- Country of origin: Canada
- Original language: English
- No. of seasons: 1

Production
- Production location: Jasper, Alberta
- Running time: 30 minutes

Original release
- Network: CBC Television
- Release: 13 June – 5 September 1970

Tee to Green is a Canadian sports education television program that was broadcast on CBC Television in 1970.

== Premise ==
Ernie Afaganis hosted the program which demonstrated golf skills for viewers. It was produced by CBC Edmonton and recorded at Jasper Park Lodge.

== Scheduling ==
Half-hour episodes were broadcast on Saturdays at 12:00 p.m. from 13 June to 5 September 1970.

== See also ==
- Golf With Stan Leonard
- Par 27
