= Ramón Silva =

Ramón Silva may refer to:

- Ramón Silva Bahamondes (1944–2020), Chilean singer and radio host
- Ramón Silva (footballer) (1884–1954), Spanish footballer
- Ramón Silva (painter) (1890–1919), Argentine painter
- Ramón Silva Pinochet (born 1868), Chilean politician
- Ramón Silva Ulloa (1914–2004), Chilean trade unionist and politician

== See also ==
- Ramón Silfa (born 1939), Dominican Republic weightlifter
