= Cedric Demetris =

Jamaican weightlifter

Personal information
- Nationality: Jamaican
- Born: 25 October 1936 (age 88)

Sport
- Sport: Weightlifting

Cedric Demetris (born 25 October 1936) is a Jamaican weightlifter. He competed in the men's light heavyweight event at the 1968 Summer Olympics.
