= Noe Rinonos =

Filipino weightlifter

Personal information
- Nationality: Filipino
- Born: 16 January 1942 (age 83); La Union, Philippines

Sport
- Sport: Weightlifting

Noe Rinonos (born 16 January 1942) is a Filipino weightlifter. He competed in the men's featherweight event at the 1968 Summer Olympics.
