= José Pérez (weightlifter) =

Dominican Republic weightlifter

Personal information
- Nationality: Dominican
- Born: 13 April 1945 (age 79); Santo Domingo, Dominican Republic

Sport
- Sport: Weightlifting

José Pérez (born 13 April 1945) is a Dominican Republic weightlifter. He competed in the men's light heavyweight event at the 1968 Summer Olympics.
