= Chit Mya =

Burmese weightlifter

Personal information
- Nationality: Burmese
- Born: 17 November 1939 (age 85)

Sport
- Sport: Weightlifting

Chit Mya (born 17 November 1939) is a Burmese weightlifter. He competed in the men's bantamweight event at the 1964 Summer Olympics.
