= Kelly VanderBeek =

Canadian alpine skier (born 1983)

Medal record

Women's alpine skiing

Representing Canada

FIS Jr. World Ski Championships
Bronze medal – third place	(France) 2003 Puy St.Vincent	Super-G
Bronze medal – third place	(Italy) 2002 Tarvisio	Super-G

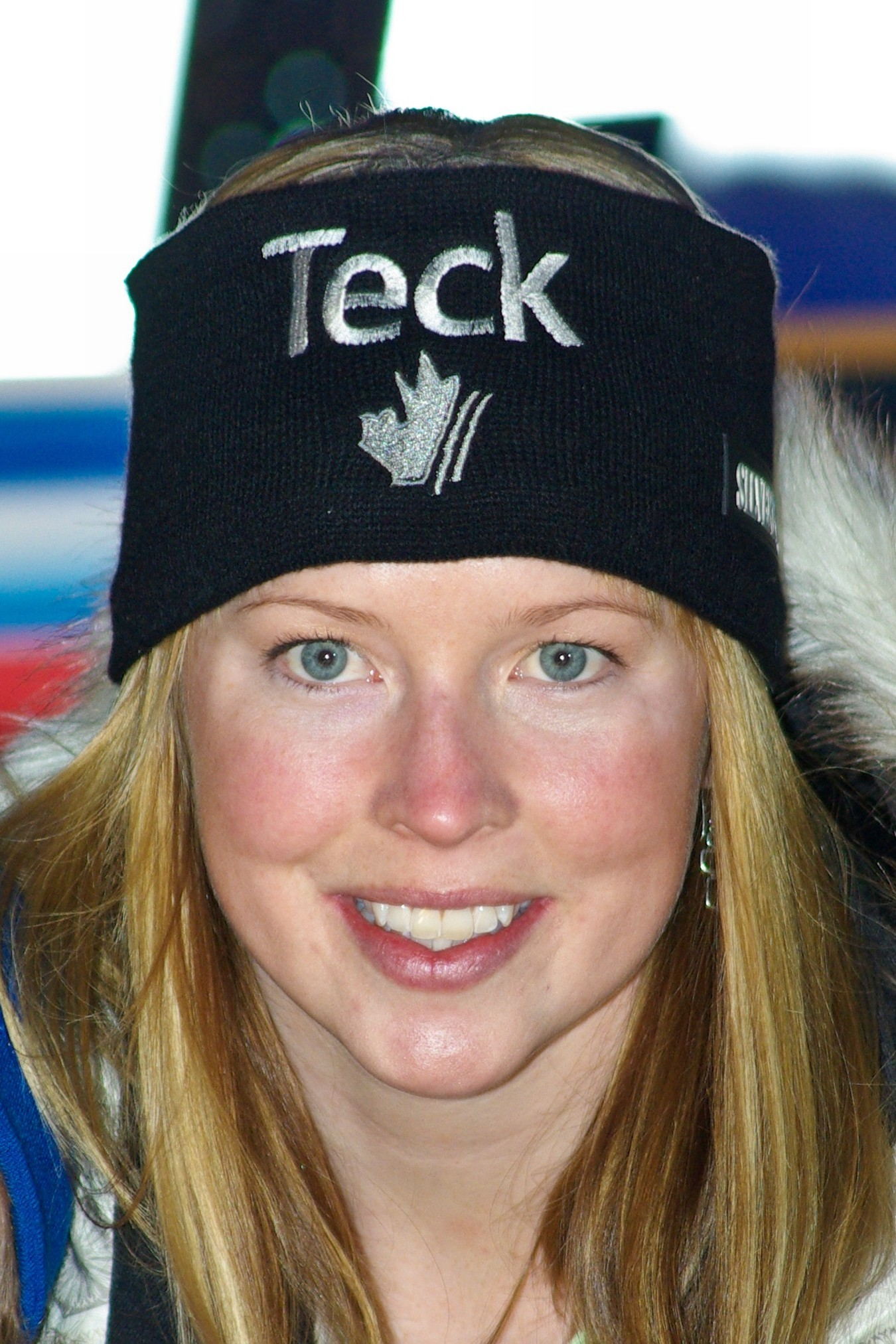

Kelly VanderBeek (born January 21, 1983, in Kapuskasing, Ontario) is a Canadian retired alpine skier originally from Kitchener, Ontario. She currently resides in Canmore, Alberta with husband (five-time Olympic kayaker) David Ford. Although she has trained at countless ski clubs over the years, she lists Chicopee Ski Club, Kitchener, Ontario as her home club.

== Ski racing career ==
VanderBeek qualified for the Canadian National Ski team in 2000 and stayed with them for 13 years. Coming from Kapuskasing, Ontario where she learned to ski on a rope tow at the Rémi Ski Hill (34m), meant that racing at Chicopee Ski Club (Kitchener, Ontario), seemed like a mountain (even through its vertical was only 61m).

In 2002, VanderBeek won both the Super-G and downhill events on the Nor-Am Cup held in Aspen, Colorado. In 2004, she continued to make her mark on the Nor-Am Cup by winning two Super-G races at Big Mountain, Montana. She placed a remarkable 3rd in the Super-G at both the 2002 and 2003 FIS Junior World Ski Championships in Tarvisio, Italy and Puy St. Vincent, France, respectively. Kelly competed in numerous Europa Cup events as well.

On December 3, 2002, VanderBeek made her FIS World Cup debut at Lake Louise, Alberta. VanderBeek then won the Canadian Junior Athlete of the Year that same year. On December 3, 2006, VanderBeek became the first Canadian woman to reach the podium on home soil, posting a 3rd-place finish at the World Cup downhill in Lake Louise.

Later, she posted two 2nd-place finishes at World Cup events in 2007 and 2008 in Sestriere, Italy and St. Anton, Austria.

On January 12, 2013, VanderBeek announced her retirement from competitive sport during a press conference held at her home club of Chicopee Ski Club. The announcement, followed by an interview with Scott Russell, was aired on CBC.

In November 2020, VanderBeek tested positive for COVID-19.

== Television Host/Broadcaster ==
VanderBeek worked as an analyst/host during the Vancouver Olympics and London Olympics for CTV, continuing with the Sochi Olympics with CBC. She hosted the Raising an Olympian features and was a part of the PrimeTime Panel discussing hot topics from the day in sport. She has also worked as a guest host for Sportsnet, CBC, and Sportscene.

VanderBeek has appeared in commercials for Aveeno (two commercials that aired in 2014) & Voltaren (one commercial that aired in 2013).

In 2015, VanderBeek worked the Calgary Stampede (rodeo & chuckwagons), Rogers Cup (tennis), guest hosted at The Shopping Channel, and covered alpine in Vail and Lake Louise.

In 2018, Vanderbeek provided daily CBC Olympic Overnight Show co-host duties, alongside Craig McMorris at the PyeongChang Winter Olympics.

== Olympics ==
At the 2006 Winter Olympics VanderBeek picked up a 4th-place finish in the Super-G event, missing the podium by only 0.03 of a second. She also won the final DH training run in Torino, causing the world to take notice of this young Canadian.

On December 17, 2009, VanderBeek saw her season end along with her 2010 Winter Olympic dream when she suffered from a torn ACL, posterior cruciate ligament (PCL), medial collateral ligament (MCL), and a tibial plateau fracture in her left knee after a crash on the second downhill training run at a World Cup in Val d'Isère, France. That same week at Val d'Isère also ended up being a season ending stop for two other Canadian Olympic hopefuls, Larisa Yurkiw and Jean-Philippe Roy.

Although VanderBeek did not compete on home soil, she was given the opportunity to carry the Olympic Flame as the torch passed through New Westminster, British Columbia. Along with other current and former members of the Canadian Alpine Ski Team, VanderBeek also appeared on live television as an alpine skiing analyst for broadcaster, CTV.

== Kelly VanderBeek Racing Club ==
In 2009, VanderBeek created the Kelly VanderBeek Racing Club (KVR) in an effort to support young racers in Southwestern Ontario. The club provides young athletes with high performance training and is based out of her home club, Chicopee Ski Club.

KVR Kids Fit is also running in the Kitchener Waterloo region providing kids with educational sports programs.

== World Cup results ==
Season	Top 10s
2008/2009	7
2007/2008	5
2006/2007	7
2005/2006	2
2004/2005	1

== Equipment and sponsorship ==
- Skis: Volkl
- Bindings: Marker
- Boots: Dalbello
- Poles: Swix
- Helmet & Goggles: POC
- Sponsor: Teck
- Other Sponsors & Suppliers: Comcor Environmental
