= Vic Lindal =

Canadian volleyball player

Vic Lindal (born 13 March 1937) is one of the founders of competitive volleyball in Canada.

== Early life ==
Lindal, was born to Victoria D. Thorsteinson, and Victor Lindal Sr. in Atlin, British Columbia. They were married 25 September 1935 in Atlin. When Vic was two years old they moved to Victoria, BC and later Cordova Bay, a municipality of Victoria. In an article in the Spindrift', a paper created by the Cordova Bay Community Club, May 1948 Vol 1. No. 5 on page 6 you will find Lindal's father listed as a member of the Cordova Bay Community Club. Of course they have the same name, and so his membership name is Victor Lindal. Lindal grew up in an athletic family, and you can find his father's name once again in the old Spindrift Newspaper as the Community's sports director February 1955 on page 3.

== Career ==
Lindal was the manager of the first Canadian Women's volleyball team in 1967, and Head Coach of the second Canadian Women's Volleyball team. He is the founder of the Pacific Rim Volleyball Championships, BC High School Girls, and BC High School Boys Volleyball programs, Japan / BC volleyball exchange programme, and co-founder of the BC Volleyball Association, and founder of the first ever Volleyball Camp in North America at Winfield, BC. Lindal was the BC Provincial Volleyball Coach in 1977.

Lindal was a colour commentator in the Sport of Volleyball at four Olympic Games; Montreal, Quebec in 1976 with CBC, Los Angeles, USA in 1984 with CBC, Seoul, Korea in 1988 with CBC, and Barcelona in 1992 with CTV. He was the first Volleyball Commentator for TSN, and commentated all major Canadian Volleyball events such as the CIAU and Canadian Beach Volleyball Championships. On 16 September 2002 Lindal won the Investor's Sport Administration Award.

Before Volleyball, Lindal was a successful athlete in many sports, including badminton, where he won the Victoria under 18 Doubles Championships in 1955. He spoke at many camps and conferences regarding the need for mental training and visualization, and this led to co-authoring the book, Endpoint Vision, and co-authoring the audio book, 90% Mental – 7 Mental Secrets to Success In Hockey

== Achievements ==
- Lindal was inducted into the Canadian Volleyball Hall of Fame in 2000, the BC Sports Hall of Fame in 2001, and the Great Victoria Sports Hall of Fame in 2003.
- Lindal won seven Canadian National Volleyball Championships as Head Coach, five with the Vancouver Calonas Women’s Team, one for Midget Boys (under 16)m and one for the Juvenile Men division. He took Canada's National Women's Team to Canada's first-ever victory over the USA in the early 1970s.

== Later years ==
Lindal used the most modern techniques in his instruction, whether as a volleyball coach or as a physical education teacher in the 1960s. Lindal completed the Iron Man triathlon at age 50. He rode his mountain bike from Victoria, BC to Manitoba at the age of 70, to fight what he calls, AADD Adult Adventure Deficit Disorder. Lindal, at the age of 78, continues to be an active member of ToastMasters International, and is a personal coach and mentor to many clients.
