= Weightlifting at the 1968 Summer Olympics – Men's 82.5 kg =

Weightlifting at the Olympics

Men's 82.5 kg at the Games of the XIX Olympiad
- Venue: Teatro de los Insurgentes
- Date: 17 October 1968
- Competitors: 26 from 22 nations
- Winning total: 485.0 kg WR

Medalists
1st place, gold medalist(s)		Boris Selitsky	Soviet Union
2nd place, silver medalist(s)		Vladimir Belyaev	Soviet Union
3rd place, bronze medalist(s)		Norbert Ozimek	Poland

The men's 82.5 kg weightlifting competitions at the 1968 Summer Olympics in Mexico City took place on 17 October at the Teatro de los Insurgentes. It was the eleventh appearance of the light heavyweight class.

== Results ==
Rank	Name	Country	kg
1	Boris Selitsky	Soviet Union	485.0
2	Vladimir Belyaev	Soviet Union	485.0
3	Norbert Ozimek	Poland	472.5
4	Győző Veres	Hungary	472.5
5	Karl Arnold	East Germany	467.5
6	Hans Zdražila	Czechoslovakia	462.5
7	Jouni Kailajärvi	Finland	445.0
8	Lee Jong-seop	South Korea	440.0
9	Víctor Ángel Pagán	Puerto Rico	435.0
10	Pierre St.-Jean	Canada	435.0
11	Rainer Dörrzapf	West Germany	435.0
12	Gino Corradini	Italy	427.5
13	Juan Curbelo	Cuba	425.0
14	Mike Pearman	Great Britain	425.0
15	Aldo Roy	Canada	420.0
16	John Bolton	New Zealand	420.0
17	Fortunato Rijna	Netherlands Antilles	420.0
18	Peter Arthur	Great Britain	415.0
19	Rudolph James	Guyana	412.5
20	José Manuel Figueroa	Puerto Rico	410.0
21	Rodolfo Castillo	Costa Rica	357.5
22	José Pérez	Dominican Republic	350.0
AC	Neville Pery	Australia	DNF
AC	Cedric Demetris	Jamaica	DNF
AC	Joe Puleo	United States	DNF
AC	Irsan Husen	Indonesia	DNF
