= Enrique Hernández (weightlifter) =

Puerto Rican weightlifter (born 1945)

Personal information
- Nationality: Puerto Rican
- Born: 13 July 1945 (age 81) Santurce, Puerto Rico

Sport
- Sport: Weightlifting

Enrique Hernández (born 13 July 1945) is a Puerto Rican weightlifter. He competed in the men's featherweight event at the 1968 Summer Olympics.
