= Preston High School (Ontario) =

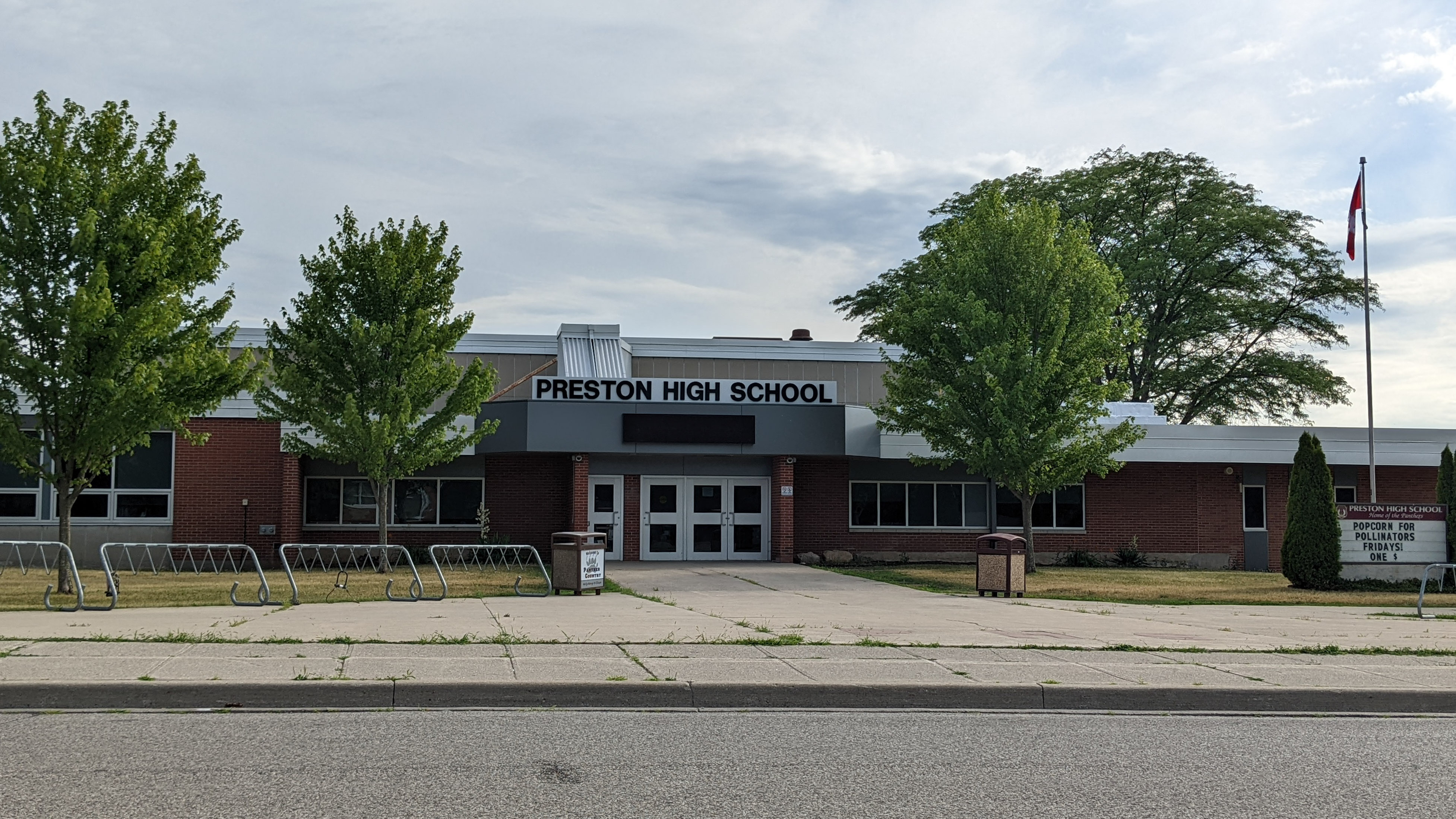

Location
- 550 Rose Street; Cambridge, Ontario, N3H 2E6; Canada; 43°23′27.61″N 80°21′54.31″W

Information
- School type: High School
- Motto: Aeterna non caduca. (Things that last, never perish.)
- Founded: 1934
- School board: Waterloo Region DSB
- School number: 936480
- Principal: Shawn Weatherdon
- Grades: 9-12
- Enrollment: 1068 (November 2017)
- Language: English
- Area: Preston & Doon-Pioneer Park
- Colours: Maroon and Gray
- Team name: Preston Panthers
- Website: phs.wrdsb.ca

Preston High School, located on the bank of the Grand River in Cambridge, Ontario, first opened in 1934. Feeder schools are William G. Davis Senior Public School, Clemens Mill Public School and Silverheights Public School in Cambridge and Doon Public School in Kitchener. It is one of sixteen secondary schools in the Waterloo Region District School Board. In 2007, approximately 300 students entered grade 9 and the total enrolment was 1253, which is a below-average number compared to other schools in the Waterloo region. The principal is Shawn Weatherdon.

== Curriculum ==
Preston has programs available in: English, mathematics, science, health and physical education, languages (Spanish and French), geography, history, family studies, business arts, visual arts (including photography), dramatic arts, music, and technological studies. Preston was previously an officially designated magnet school for enhanced academic students, but now the "Enhanced" program is only available to students who live within the school's catchment area.

== Facilities ==
The 1934 school was on Hamilton Street. The current Preston High School building opened in 1956, with expansions in 1986 and 2004.

Preston High School's facilities include 58 classrooms, a small cafetorium, 2 gyms—one single, one double—a library, 6 technological studies rooms, 2 art rooms, 6 computer labs, and a music room with 3 practice rooms. A new science wing with four science labs and a computer room was added in September 2004. The library was also renovated in 2018-2019.

The back campus includes a playing field for football, field hockey,soccer, tennis, and rugby with access to a smaller practice field. There is also a tennis court. The track and field team practices on a regulation size cinder track. Beside the Grand River and near the school is the Linear Trail, a 3.5km community trail which the cross country and track and field teams use. Two ice surfaces, the Preston Auditorium and the Homuth Arena, are within walking distance.

== Athletics ==
Preston's sports consist of football, basketball, volleyball, badminton, curling, ice hockey, rugby, golf, soccer, tennis, slo-pitch, wrestling, cross-country, track and field, and field hockey, there is also a variety of musical options, such as band, choir, and drama.

Preston put together a successful soccer team in the 2011, 2012 and 2013 seasons. They were able to cap off these seasons with the schools first CWOSSA soccer championship in 2012.

Football is one of the biggest sports at Preston. The senior football team have been successful over the years and have won the title of WCCSSA Champions in 2003, 2004 and 2006. However, in 2007, Preston was upset by Galt Collegiate Institute in the playoffs semifinals. In the 2012 season the Panther's Junior football won the WCSSA championship, defeating the Jacob Hespeler Hawks.

Preston won the WCSSAA Championship for Boys Hockey in 2015 beating the Grand River Renegades 2-1, capturing their first title since 1996.

Preston has also had success with their cross-country, badminton, and curling teams. They have won many awards in these sports and sometimes the teams make it to WCCSSA and CWOSSA.

== Arts ==
Preston High School has consistent achievement in the Arts departments. Each year, students in visual arts participate in the Kitchener-Waterloo Art Gallery's student-only "Expressions" exhibit, and those in the photographic classes contribute to PhotoSensitive projects.

In Drama, Preston's Improv Team has finished within the top 3 teams in the Guelph/Niagara Region for the past 10 years in the Canadian Improv Games, and placed top 10 and top 5 overall in Canada in 2005 and 2009 respectively. Preston has also seen great success at the Sears Ontario Drama Festival, frequently moving onto the Regional showcase, and receiving awards of merit and excellence for their productions.

The music department offers many traditional big band instruments, with a new addition of acoustic guitars. Symphonic Band, Concert Band, Jazz Band, and Concert Choir are all extracurricular opportunities. These groups compete in the Georgian Bay Regional MusicFest, and the Ontario Vocal Festival.

The school is also the first in Waterloo Region to start an online high school radio station licensed by SOCAN. Listeners can stream PHS Panther Radio to hear various student-run shows and podcasts.

== Global Outreach ==
Global Outreach is a program in which students do charity work in different countries. It is run by the Geography Department and all their work is non profit.

- 2006 - Thailand and Cambodia
- 2007 - Kenya and Tanzania
- 2008 - Peru
- 2009 - China and Vietnam
- 2010 - India (however, this trip was canceled due to travel advisories)
- 2011 - Morocco
- 2012 - Chile

== Notable alumni ==
- Jeff Hutcheson, CTV broadcaster, Host on Canada AM, Author
- Brenda Irving, CBC TV sports commentator
- Scott Thorman, MLB baseball player
- John Moss, PhD FRSC Professor Emeritus, University of Ottawa, Author 30+ books, literary criticism to dystopian mysteries
- Nathan Brannen, Canadian Olympic Middle Distance Runner

== See also ==
- Education in Ontario
- List of secondary schools in Ontario
