= Francisco Echevarría =

Guatemalan weightlifter

Personal information
- Born: 4 June 1947 (age 77); Senahú, Guatemala

Sport
- Sport: Weightlifting

Francisco Echevarría (born 4 June 1947) is a Guatemalan weightlifter. He competed in the men's featherweight event at the 1968 Summer Olympics.
