= Dieter Rauscher =

German weightlifter

Personal information
- Nationality: German
- Born: 28 April 1942 (age 82); Cheb, Czechoslovakia

Sport
- Sport: Weightlifting

Dieter Rauscher (born 28 April 1942) is a German weightlifter. He competed in the men's featherweight event at the 1968 Summer Olympics.
