= Guillermo Boyd =

Panamanian weightlifter

Personal information
- Nationality: Panamanian
- Born: 26 January 1938 (age 87)

Sport
- Sport: Weightlifting

Guillermo Boyd (born 26 January 1938) is a Panamanian weightlifter. He competed in the men's bantamweight event at the 1968 Summer Olympics.
