= Diana Swain =

Canadian journalist and news producer (born 1965)

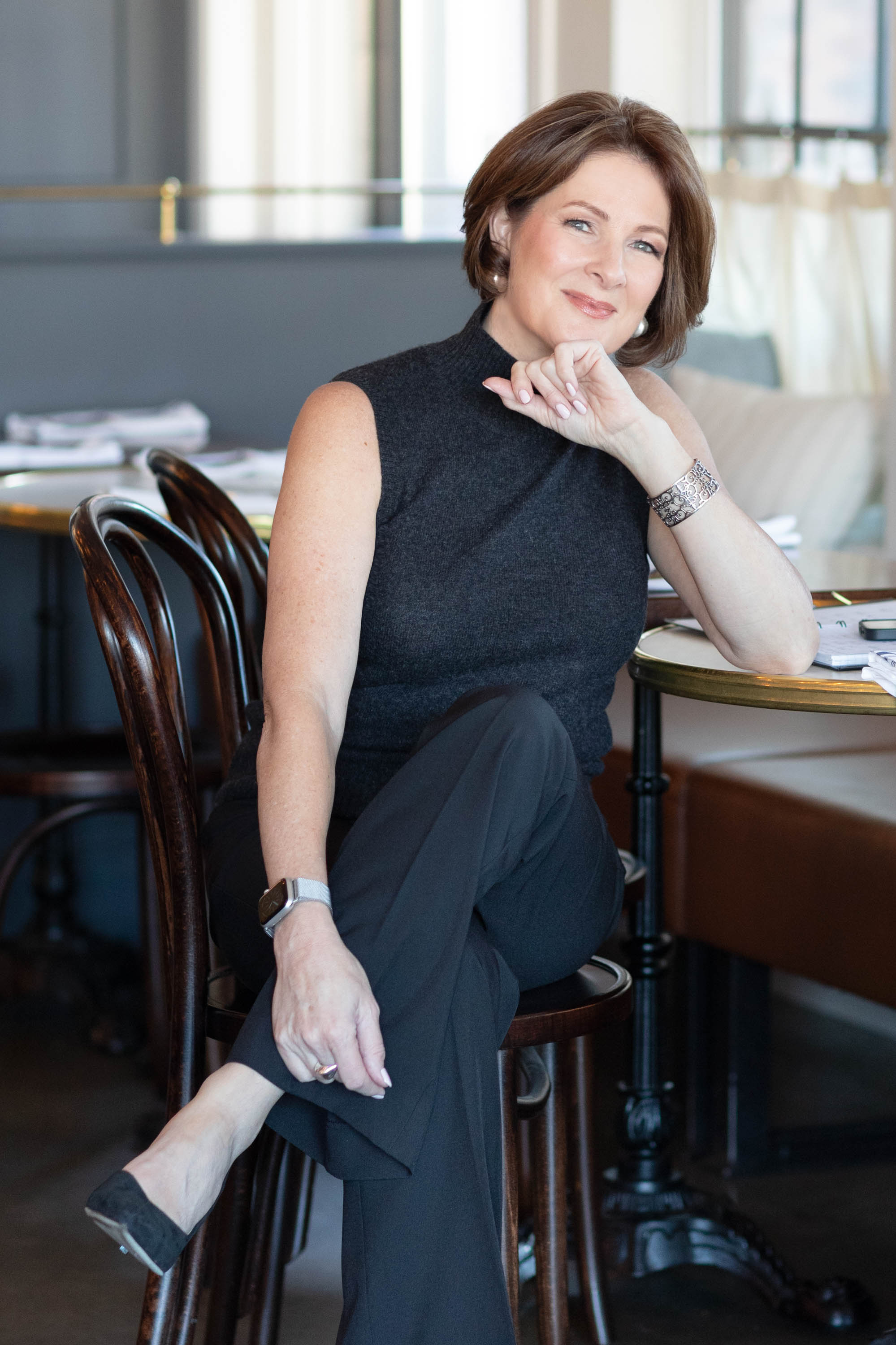
- Born: 1965 (age 60–61)
- Education: British Columbia Institute of Technology
- Occupations: Founder of Diana Swain Strategies, public speaker
- Notable work: 33-year journalist at CBC News
- Television: CBC News, The Fifth Estate, Marketplace, Go Public, Network News Investigative Unit

Diana Swain is a public speaker and the founder of Diana Swain Strategies, an executive coaching and communications consulting firm based in Toronto, Ontario, Canada. Swain established the firm in January 2024 after a career as a Canadian journalist.

Swain worked at CBC News, Canada’s public broadcaster, for over 33 years before deciding to leave in December 2023 to start her own business. In her final role as managing editor of investigations, she was responsible for management oversight of the network's main investigative properties, including The Fifth Estate, Marketplace, Go Public and the network news investigative unit.

Previously, she was the executive producer of The Fifth Estate] for two seasons, from 2021 to 2023. In her first season in that role, the program won the Canadian Screen Award for Best News or Information Series. It was nominated again for the award the following year, but did not win.

From 2019 to 2021, Swain was the senior investigative editor for the Investigative Unit, which provided investigative news stories to all network platforms, including television, radio and online news.

Swain had previously held simultaneous on-air roles at the public broadcaster. From 2010 to 2019 she was the network's senior investigative correspondent reporting regularly for the network's flagship news program, The National. She often routinely filled in as anchor on the program for long-time news host, Peter Mansbridge.

Swain often hosted CBC News Network programs. She also produced and hosted her own weekly program, The Investigators with Diana Swain which aired on the main CBC network and its 24-hour cable news station, CBC News Network. The program ran from 2016 to 2019.

== Early life and career ==
Swain was born in Thompson, Manitoba. Her parents separated when she was young and she moved with her mother and younger sister to Chilliwack, British Columbia where she graduated from high school in 1983. In 1984, she represented Chilliwack in the Miss Canada pageant. She worked for a weekly magazine in Chilliwack for ten months and as a reporter at both the Chilliwack Progress and the radio station CHWK, before moving on to a radio station in Kamloops, British Columbia and then a radio station newsroom in Prince George, British Columbia. She began reading the news for CKPG-TV in Prince George in 1986.

== Winnipeg ==
Swain first entered Winnipeg television as co-anchor of the evening newscast on independent station CKND in 1988. She co-anchored the newscast with her father Brian Swain.

Swain joined CBC's Winnipeg station CBWT in 1990. She started as a reporter for the local news program 24 Hours and quickly became a national reporter. She covered Manitoba and Saskatchewan for The National before becoming anchor of 24 Hours. In 2000, Swain's work on 24 Hours was recognized when she won the first of three Gemini Awards for Best News Anchor.

In 2000, she anchored the Winnipeg portion of CBC's Canada Now before leaving for the investigative program Disclosure.

== Toronto ==
Initially, Swain commuted to Toronto from Winnipeg while working on Disclosure, but in 2003, she and her family moved to Oakville, Ontario. A year later, Disclosure was cancelled, and Swain became the host of CBC News Toronto. She frequently substituted for Peter Mansbridge as anchor of CBC's flagship news show, The National.

On August 6, 2010, she stepped down as anchor of CBC News Toronto to move to the CBC News Investigative unit, where she became Senior Investigative Correspondent and makes frequent reports on The National. In 2014, she became an anchor on CBC News Network. In 2016, she began hosting a new program, The Investigators with Diana Swain, which looks at the work of investigative journalists and the challenges and ethical questions they face. She also reports on CBC Radio and can be seen on cbcnews.ca.

Swain was chosen to be one of CBC’s lead hosts for the Olympics in Beijing in 2008. She was paired with sports host Scott Russell.

Swain reprised the role with sports host David Amber in Sochi, Russia in 2014. She covered the 2018 Olympics in Pyeongchang, Korea for the CBC News department as a reporter.

Swain was given the alumnus of the year award from her alma mater, the British Columbia Institute of Technology in 2006, recognizing her achievements in the news industry. She received an honorary degree from Humber College in June, 2010.

In 2017, she received an honorary doctorate in technology from BCIT, and gave the convocation speech 30 years after her own graduation from the school's journalism program.

After 30 years with the CBC, Swain retired from the network in January 2024 to launch her own consulting business.

== Personal life ==
Swain married television technical producer Eric Milotzki in May 2024. The two met while working at CBC. She has two adult children from her first marriage. She was previously married to Ron Kuipers; they divorced in 2014.
