= Carlos Pérez (weightlifter) =

Nicaraguan weightlifter (born 1938)

Personal information
- Born: 18 August 1938 (age 88) Managua, Nicaragua

Sport
- Sport: Weightlifting

Carlos Pérez (born 18 August 1938) is a Nicaraguan weightlifter. He competed in the men's featherweight event at the 1968 Summer Olympics.
