= Ali Rajabi Eslami =

Iranian weightlifter

Ali Rajabi
Personal information
- Full name: Ali Rajabi Eslami
- Nationality: Iranian
- Born: 27 April 1937 (age 87)

Sport
- Sport: Weightlifting

Ali Rajabi Eslami (Persian: علی رجبی اسلامی; born 27 April 1937) is an Iranian weightlifter. He competed in the men's bantamweight event at the 1964 Summer Olympics.
