= Ernie Afaganis =

Canadian sports broadcaster

Ernie Afaganis (born c. 1928) is a Canadian sports broadcaster, known for his work at CBC Sports. He was born in Lethbridge, Alberta.

== Career ==
After graduating with a Bachelor of Arts from Eastern Washington University, Afaganis returned to Alberta where in 1953 he joined CFRN in Edmonton. In 1961, he joined CBC Television at CBXT, also in Edmonton.

From there, he gained prominence as a sportscaster on CBC's national service. He was host of CBC's Sports Weekend programme in its debut season. He was also a sideline reporter for the CFL on CBC.

== Awards and recognition ==
In 1977, he was inducted into the Alberta Sports Hall of Fame. In November 2007, he was inducted into the CBC Sports Hall of Fame. In 1988, he was inducted to the Football Reporters of Canada hall of fame, a journalistic honour associated with the Canadian Football Hall of Fame.

== Shows ==
Afaganis was a host of the following CBC Television programmes:

- Tee to Green (1970)
- Snow Motion (1978)
- Canadian Superstars (1978–1981)
- Par 27 (1978–1980)
