= Brenda Irving =

Canadian television sports journalist

Brenda Irving is a Canadian television sports journalist employed by CBC Television. She was the first female Hockey Night in Canada rinkside reporter between 2001 and 2006, and previously served for seven years as a news reporter. She has also reported on Canadian football, the FIFA World Cup, and major league baseball. She graduated from Conestoga College's radio and television broadcasting programme. She was born in Cambridge, Ontario, where she attended Preston High School. She called Gymnastics at the 2008 Summer Olympics for CBC.
