= Rob Snoek =

Canadian sports broadcaster and former athlete

Personal information
- Born: 1969 (age 56–57) Orono, Ontario, Canada

Sport
- Country: Canada
- Sport: Paralympic athletics
- Disability class: T44
Medal record
Paralympic athletics
Representing Canada
World Championships
Silver medal – second place	1998 Birmingham	100m T44
Bronze medal – third place	1998 Birmingham	200m T44

Rob Snoek (born 1969) is a Canadian sports broadcaster and former athlete, who won the Canadian Screen Award for Best Sports Play-by-Play at the 12th Canadian Screen Awards in 2024 for his work with CBC Sports. He was previously nominated in the same category at the 10th Canadian Screen Awards in 2022 for his work as a member of the CBC Sports broadcast team at the 2020 Summer Olympics.

A native of Orono, Ontario, Snoek's lower left leg was amputated at age one due to a congenital bone disease. He was a competitor in amputee athletics events, most notably at the 1992 Summer Paralympics, the 1996 Summer Paralympics and the 2000 Summer Paralympics. He was a bronze medalist at the paralympic edition of the World Athletics Championships in 1998.

After his retirement from competitive sport he moved into broadcasting as a play-by-play announcer for Ontario Hockey League games, first for the Oshawa Generals on CKDO, and later for Peterborough Petes games on CJMB-FM. He first joined the CBC's Olympic team in 2002, covering a variety of both main Olympic and Paralympic events.

He was inducted into the Canadian Disability Hall of Fame in 2017.
