= Irsan Husen =

Indonesian weightlifter (1940–2007)

Personal information
- Nationality: Indonesian
- Born: 7 December 1940; Surabaya, Indonesia
- Died: 26 January 2007 (aged 66)

Sport
- Sport: Weightlifting

Irsan Husen (7 December 1940 – 26 January 2007) was an Indonesian weightlifter. He competed in the men's light heavyweight event at the 1968 Summer Olympics.
