= Róbert Nagy (weightlifter) =

Hungarian weightlifter

Personal information
- Nationality: Hungarian
- Born: 3 June 1940 (age 84); Székesfehérvár, Hungary

Sport
- Sport: Weightlifting

Róbert Nagy (born 3 June 1940) is a Hungarian weightlifter. He competed in the men's bantamweight event at the 1964 Summer Olympics.
