= Chantal Vallée =

American basketball coach

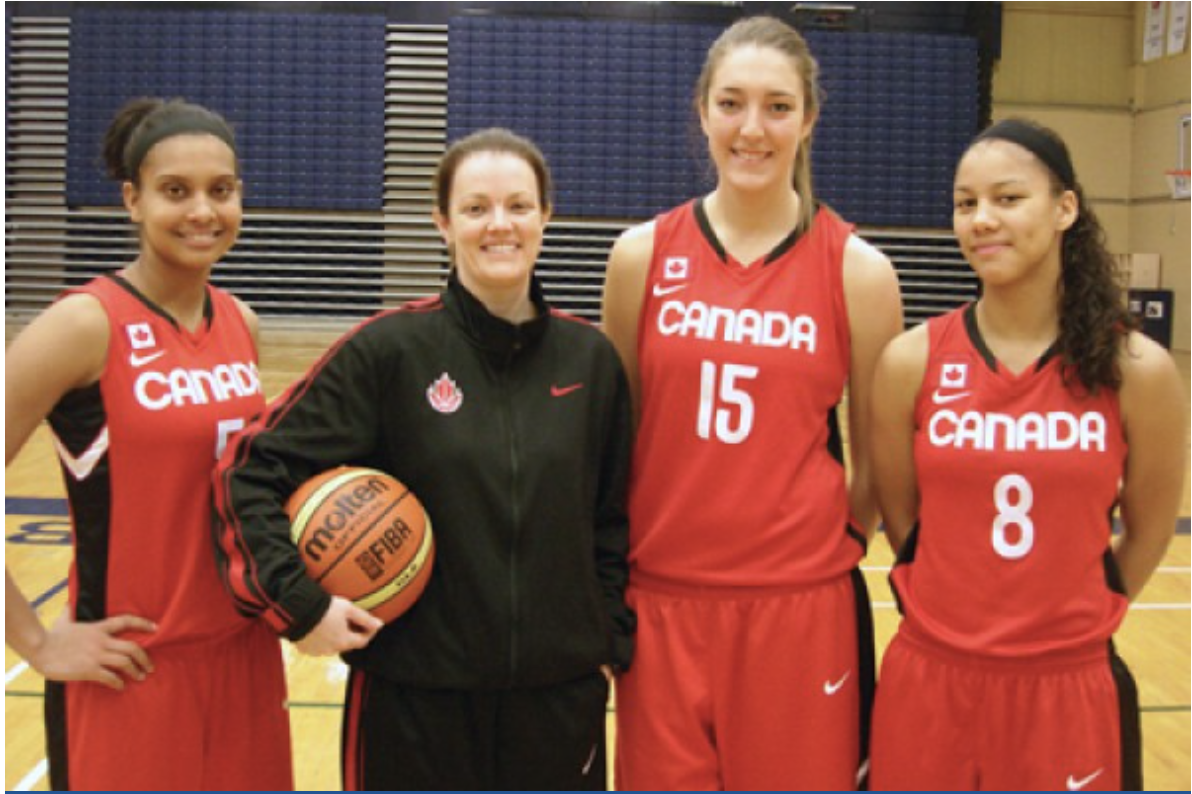
- Chantal Vallée and the Canadian National Senior B team, 2013

Current position
- Title: Head Coach
- Team: Windsor Lancers women's basketball program
- Conference: OUA, U Sports
- Record: 400-143 (0.74)

Biographical details
- Born: Kamloops, British Columbia

Accomplishments and honors

Championships
- CIS/USPORTS National Championship 2011–2015.; OUA Provincial Championships 2009–2011, 2013–2015.; OUA-West Conference Championships 2009–2015.

Awards
- CAAWS Most Influential Women in Canada – 2016; Her Majesty Queen's Elizabeth II's Diamond Jubilee medal – 2013; Athena Leadership Award – 2012

Records
- CIS/USports Women's Basketball Coach of the Year – 2013–2014, 2014–2015; OUA Fox 40 Overall Female Coach of Year – 2009, 2011, 2013 & 2015; OUA West Women’s Basketball Coach of the Year – 2009, 2011–2012, 2014–2015; University of Windsor Gino Fracas Coach of the Year – 2008, 2009 & 2011, 2013–2015; WESPY Awards Coach of the Year – 2012–2013

Chantal Vallée is a professional basketball coach who has established one of the top women's basketball program at the University of Windsor in Canada. Vallée holds the U Sports Canadian record for the most consecutive National Championships won in women's basketball with five consecutive national titles in 2011, 2012, 2013, 2014, and 2015. Vallée also led her team to ten consecutive Ontario University Athletics (OUA) conference finals, earning nine consecutive OUA medals.

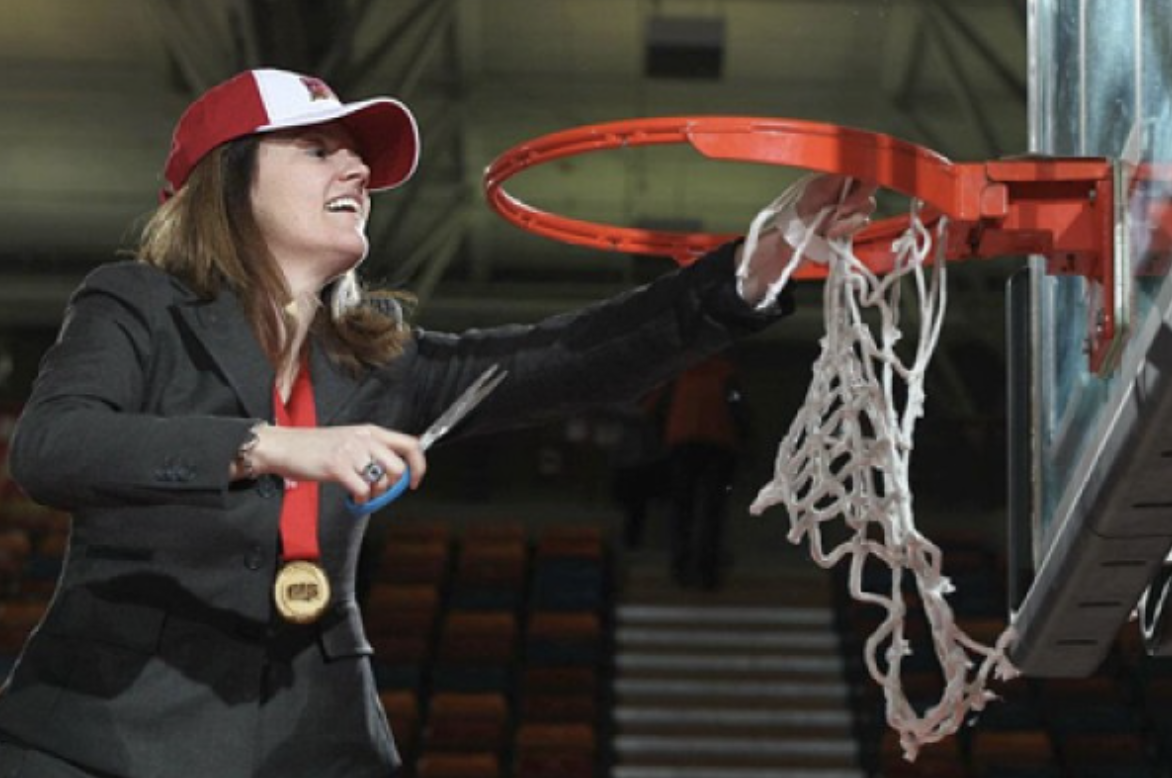
National Championship Win, 2015

In 2018, the University of Windsor granted Chantal Vallée a sabbatical, during which she assumed the dual roles of general manager and head coach for the Hamilton Honey Badgers a men's professional basketball team competing in the Canadian Elite Basketball League. This groundbreaking appointment made Vallée the first woman to hold both positions simultaneously for a men's professional basketball team. As the general manager, her responsibility was to construct the franchise from its foundation. As the GM Vallée reached success with the franchise by signing players with NBA affiliation and experience, such as Xavier Rathan Mayes, who had played for the Memphis Grizzlies, Ricky Tarrant Jr., Demetrius Denzel Dyson, and Keanau Post who played in the NBA G-League. As head coach, she led the team to the league's national championship final in her first season, achieving a remarkable upset over the top-ranked Niagara River Lions in the playoffs semifinal. Vallée was offered a contract extension from Honey Badgers president John Lashway, but discussion with the University of Windsor made this possibility uncertain with regards to a format that would allow her to remain with the Honey Badgers through an extended sabbatical from Windsor, or by fulfilling both coaching duties.

Following her successful one-year secondment by the University of Windsor, she returned to her position at Windsor.

Vallée embarked on her coaching career by leading a men's AAA level high school program in Quebec that finished fourth-place finish in the province. Subsequently, she assumed the role of head coach for the women's basketball program at Vanier College.

Vallée has dedicated multiple seasons to serving as an assistant coach for the Canadian Development and Junior National women's teams. She has also contributed her expertise as an assistant coach at McGill University for two seasons and the University of British Columbia for one season.

== Coaching career ==
=== University of Windsor as Head Coach ===
Chantal Vallée presently serves as the head coach of the Windsor Lancers women's basketball program. On March 20, 2011, Vallée led the Windsor Lancers women's basketball team to their first-ever Canadian University Championship, marking a historic milestone. Following that triumph, the team went on to secure five consecutive national titles, tying the record for the most consecutive victories in women's basketball also reached by Laurentian University from 1975 to 1979.

During the 2012–13 season, Vallée's team achieved an exceptional feat by attaining a flawless 21–0 record, as the Windsor Lancers became the first team in the history of OUA women's basketball to remain undefeated since the league implemented its expanded schedule.

=== Hamilton Honey Badgers as General Manager and Head Coach ===
Vallée made history by serving as both the general manager and head coach for the Hamilton Honey Badgers, a team that emerged within the recently established Canadian Elite Basketball League. This groundbreaking accomplishment marked the first instance of a woman simultaneously holding both positions for a men's professional basketball team.

=== Vanier College Women’s Basketball program as Head Coach ===
Prior to her tenure at Windsor, Vallée served as the head coach of the Vanier College Women's Basketball program for three seasons.

=== McGill University Women’s Basketball program as Assistant Coach ===
Before taking on the role of head coach at Vanier College, Vallée gained valuable experience as an assistant coach for two seasons with McGill University's women's basketball program. Furthermore, she contributed her expertise as an assistant coach at the University of British Columbia for one season.

=== Canada Junior and Senior B National Team ===
During the off-seasons of university basketball, Vallée contributed as an assistant coach to the Canadian National Team program both with the Junior program and the Senior B team. Her involvement encompassed international competition events such as:

- FIBA America Championship USA 2009
- World Championship Chile, 2010
- World University Games Russia, 2013
- World University Games, Tapei, 20

=== Quebec Provincial team as Head Coach ===
Vallée took on the role of head coach for the Quebec Provincial team, guiding them to a bronze medal finish at the 2002 Nation

al Championships hosted in New Brunswick.

=== Broadcast Personality ===
==== Basketball Colour Commentary ====
Vallée has contributed as a colour commentator for basketball on prominent Canadian broadcasting channels, including CBC, CTV, Sportsnet, TSN, and RDS. Her extensive coverage encompasses significant sporting events such as the 2012, 2016 and 2020 Summer Olympics. and the 2019 NBA play-offs.

=== Author ===
Vallée has authored two scientific published articles based on her academic research on the topic of transformational leadership: "Building a Successful University Program" in the Journal of Applied Sport Psychology in 2005, and "Four Keys to Building a Championship Culture" in the International Sport Coaching Journal in 2016.

In 2023, Vallée made a notable appearance as a keynote speaker at the Rotary International World Convention in Melbourne, Australia, in front of 14,000 attendees.

In 2018 Vallée delivered a TEDx talk, From Underdog to Topdog.

As a contributing author, Vallée collaborated to Women for the Win, an account of accomplished Canadian basketball players and coaches that reached three #1 best-seller positions in Canada.

=== Awards and honours ===
In 2016, Vallée was named CAAWS most influential women in Canada as a coach. In April 2012, she was honoured with the Athena Award, acknowledging her remarkable accomplishments as a business professional, her impactful community involvement, and her dedication to mentoring future women leaders. Additionally, in 2013, Vallée was presented with the Diamond Jubilee medal by Her Majesty Queen Elizabeth II, in recognition of her outstanding work beyond the realm of basketball.

- CAAWS Most Influential Women in Canada, Coach Category
- Her Majesty Queen Elizabeth II Diamond Jubilee Medal
- Athena International Award

Since joining the Lancers, Vallée has received eighteen Coach of the Year awards :

- CIS/U Sports National Championship titles in 2011, 2012, 2013, 2014, 2015
- CIS Women's Basketball Coach of the Year in 2014 and 2015
- OUA Fox 40 Overall Female Coach of the Year in 2009, 2011, 2013, 2015
- OUA Women's Basketball Coach of the Year in 2009, 2010, 2012 2014, 2015
- University of Windsor Gino Fracas Coach of the Year in 2008, 2009, 2011, 2012, 2014, 2015
- WESPY Awards Coach of the Year in 2012 2013 and 2016
