= Shiro Ichinoseki =

Japanese weightlifter (born 1944)

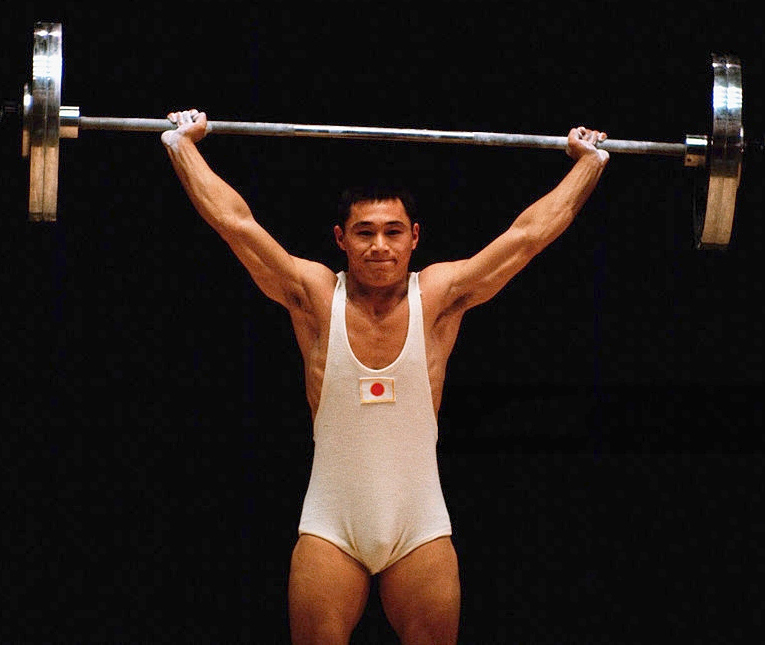
- Shiro Ichinoseki at the 1964 Olympics

Personal information
- Born: January 24, 1944 (age 82) Hachirogata, Akita, Japan
- Height: 1.72 m (5 ft 8 in)
- Weight: 56 kg (123 lb)

Sport
- Sport: Weightlifting
Medal record
Representing Japan
Summer Olympics
Bronze medal – third place	1964 Tokyo	bantamweight
World Championships
Bronze medal – third place	1963 Stockholm	-56 kg
Bronze medal – third place	1964 Tokyo	-56 kg
Silver medal – second place	1965 Tehran	-56 kg

Shiro Ichinoseki (一ノ関史郎, Ichinoseki Shirō; born January 24, 1944) is a retired Japanese bantamweight weightlifter. He competed at the 1964 and 1968 Olympics and finished in third and fifth place, respectively. Between 1963 and 1965 he set three official world records – two in the snatch and one in the total.
