= Chris Wightman =

Canadian luger (born 1966)

Personal information
- Born: 24 April 1966 (age 59); Ottawa, Ontario, Canada

Sport
- Sport: Luge

Chris Wightman (born 24 April 1966) is a Canadian luger. He competed in the men's singles event at the 1988 Winter Olympics.
