= Ramón Silfa =

Dominican Republic weightlifter

Personal information
- Nationality: Dominican
- Born: 11 November 1939 (age 85); Santo Domingo, Nicaragua

Sport
- Sport: Weightlifting

Ramón Silfa (born 11 November 1939) is a Dominican Republic weightlifter. He competed in the men's featherweight event at the 1968 Summer Olympics.
