= Erminia Russo =

Canadian volleyball player (born 1964)

Erminia Russo (born July 24, 1964, in Kelowna) is a retired female volleyball player from Canada.

Russo competed for her native country at the 1996 Summer Olympics in Atlanta. There, she finished in 10th place with the Women's National Team.
