= Geoffrey Gowan =

Geoffrey Gowan, CM, (November 2, 1929 – May 16, 2013) was a Canadian sports broadcaster for the CBC and a sport executive at Coaching Association of Canada. He died at the age of 83 after battling with Parkinson's disease since 1996.

== Biography ==
Gowan was born in Ravenglass, Cumbria, England. Leaving Loughborough Colleges, where he was a lecturer for the United States]in 1965 to obtain an M.Sc. from Purdue University, a Ph.D. from the University of Wisconsin–Madison. Whilst at Loughborough he brought the fundamentals of track and field to all students with his lively instruction and the use of key phrases. He coached the track and field team of the mid-sixties working alongside Basil Stamatakis. His North American coaching career began as a professor and athletics coach at McMaster University in 1968. He became the technical director and president of CAC from 1972 to 1996.

== Cultural impact ==
The Geoff Gowan Award recognizes the lifetime achievements of Canadian coaches by the Coaching Association of Canada.
