= Aldo Roy =

Canadian weightlifter (1942–2026)

Personal information
- Born: 22 March 1942 Sudbury, Ontario, Canada
- Died: 18 April 2026 (aged 84) Ottawa, Ontario, Canada

Sport
- Sport: Weightlifting

Aldo Roy (22 March 1942 – 18 April 2026) was a Canadian weightlifter. He competed in the men's light heavyweight event at the 1968 Summer Olympics. Roy died in Ottawa on 18 April 2026, at the age of 84.
