= Mark Lee (sportscaster) =

Canadian sportscaster

- Born: 1955 or 1956 (age 69–70); Ottawa, Ontario, Canada
- Education: Carleton University (1975–1980)
- Occupation: Sports broadcaster
- Employer: Rogers Media
- Spouse: Carol
- Children: 3
- Awards: Gemini Award, ACTRA Award (2)
- Football career

Profile
- Position: Quarterback

Career history
- 1975–1978: Carleton Ravens

Mark Lee (born c. 1956) is a Canadian sportscaster with Rogers Sportsnet and formerly with CBC Sports. While at CBC, Lee covered the National Hockey League, women's ice hockey, Canadian Football League, Olympic Games and the Pan Am Games. He was born in Ottawa around 1956 to William and Doreen Croswell Lee, and he attended the Earl of March Secondary School in Ottawa. He quarterbacked the Carleton Ravens football team for four years, graduating with a journalism degree. He then worked as a news anchor at CFCF radio in Montreal. Lee then moved to Toronto where he worked at CBC Radio as a national sports reporter where he also hosted the sports magazine show The Inside Track.

From 2008 to 2014, Lee served as the main western play-by-play voice for Hockey Night in Canada and worked first round playoff series. In addition, he read most of the pre-recorded continuity and sponsorship announcements on CBC Sports broadcasts. For the 2008 Summer Olympics and 2016 Summer Olympics, Lee covered the track and field events for CBC. Lee was the on field reporter for CBC Sports during the 1997 150 metre race between Donovan Bailey and Michael Johnson.

Lee has earned a Gemini Award, two ACTRA Awards. He lives in Cambridge, Ontario with his family.

Lee was laid off by the CBC in August 2014 after the network ceded control of its NHL coverage to Rogers Media-owned Sportsnet. Lee has since joined Sportsnet on a part-time basis and mainly covers amateur sporting events.
