= Karin Larsen (broadcaster) =

Canadian sportscaster

Karin Larsen (born September 25, 1963 in New Westminster, British Columbia) is a Canadian broadcaster and Olympic synchronised swimmer. She is currently a news and sports reporter for the Vancouver, British Columbia edition of the Canadian Broadcasting Corporation's evening news, CBC News at Six, for which she won a Leo Award in 1999. She competed in the 1988 Summer Olympics in synchronised swimming, was inducted into the BC Swimming Hall of Fame in 2001, and is the sister of Olympic silver medallist Christine Larsen.

== Biography ==
Karin Larsen was born in 1963 in New Westminster, British Columbia, grew up in nearby Coquitlam, British Columbia, and later earned a Communications Degree from Simon Fraser University.

Larsen, along with her younger sister Christine, distinguished herself as an elite amateur athlete in the field of synchronised swimming, winning a World Championship in team synchronised swimming in Madrid, Spain, in 1986 and competing in the 1988 Seoul Olympics.

Larsen's career in the media began in 1988 as a sports researcher for the Canadian Broadcasting Corporation, and since she began working as a sportscaster, she has been an announcer for six Olympic Games and four Paralympic Games, notably broadcasting the play-by-play for her own sister's silver medal performance in the 1996 Summer Olympics in Atlanta, Georgia.

Larsen also announced for synchronised swimming for CBC Sports at the 2008 Summer Olympics in Beijing, China.

Larsen is currently (as of January 2020) a news and sports reporter for CBC Vancouver's evening news.

== Awards and recognition ==
- World Champion - 1986 - Synchronised Swimming
- Leo Award - 1999 - Best Sportscaster in Vancouver
- British Columbia Swimming Hall of Fame - 2001 - Inductee
- Coquitlam Sports Hall of Fame — 2019 Inductees
