= Yang Mu-sin =

South Korean weightlifter (born 1942)

Personal information
- Nationality: South Korean
- Born: 28 February 1942 (age 83)

Sport
- Sport: Weightlifting

Yang Mu-sin (born 28 February 1942) is a South Korean weightlifter. He competed at the 1964 Summer Olympics and the 1968 Summer Olympics.
