= Chaiya Sukchinda =

Thai weightlifter

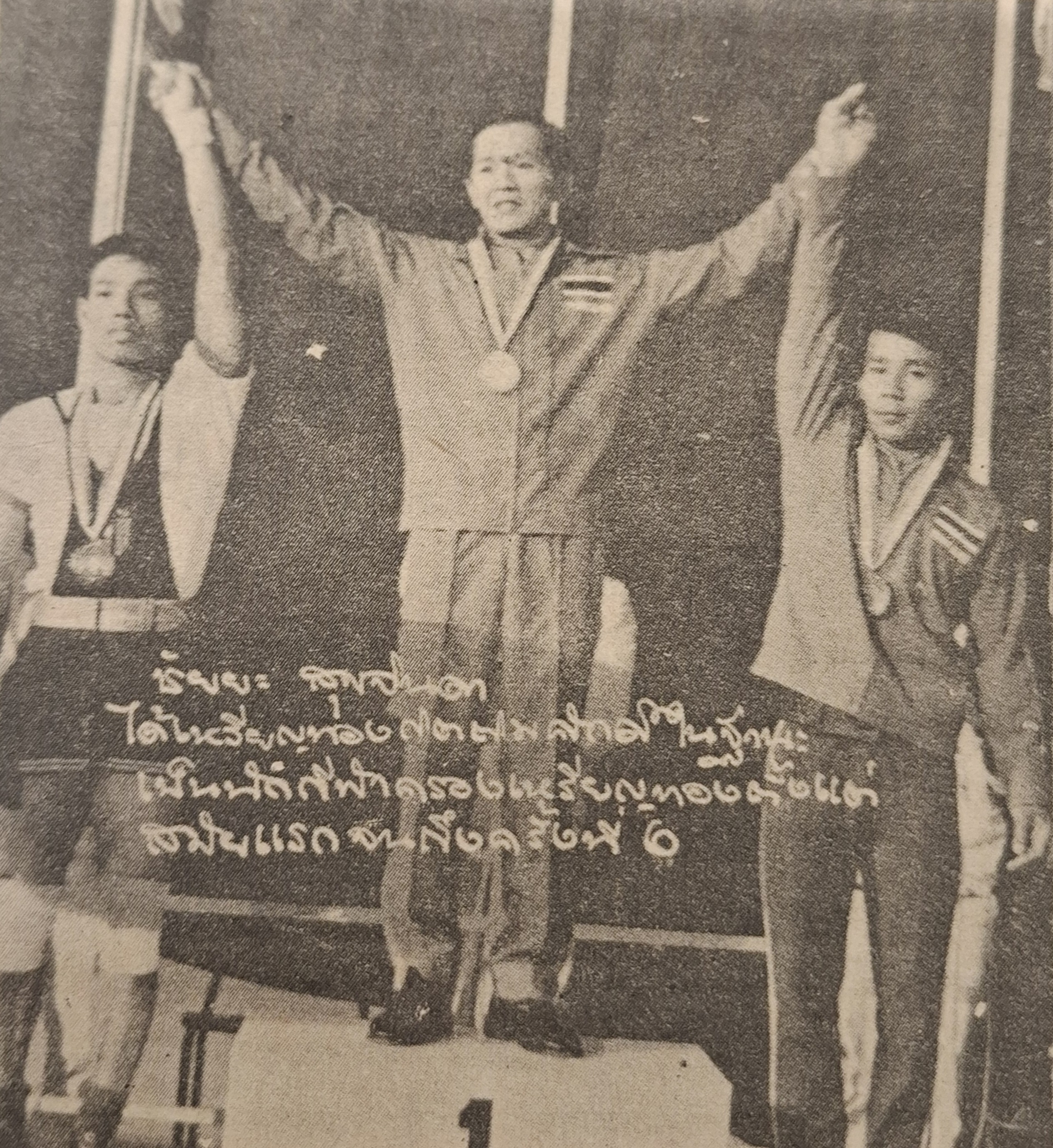
- Chaiya (Central)

Personal information
- Born: 15 April 1935 (age 91) Bangkok, Thailand
- Height: 1.55 m (5 ft 1 in)
- Weight: 52 kg (115 lb)

Sport
- Sport: Weightlifting
Medal record
Representing Thailand
Olympic Games
	1972 Munich	-52 kg
Asian Games
Gold medal – first place	1966 Bangkok	-52 kg

Chaiya Sukchinda (Thai: ชัยยะ สุขจินดา) (born 15 April 1935), worked as a taxi driver in Bangkok, is a retired Thai weightlifter who placed seventh in the flyweight class at the 1972 Olympics. Previously, he won the gold medal in 1966 Asian Games edition in Bangkok, Thailand, which earning him a new taxi car as incentive.
