= Mohamed Herit =

Egyptian weightlifter

Personal information
- Nationality: Egyptian
- Born: 16 April 1937 (age 87); Cairo, Egypt

Sport
- Sport: Weightlifting

Mohamed Herit (born 16 April 1937) is an Egyptian weightlifter. He competed at the 1964 Summer Olympics and the 1968 Summer Olympics.
