= Golf With Stan Leonard =

- Genre: Sports instruction
- Country of origin: Canada
- Original language: English
- No. of seasons: 4

Production
- Producer: Doug Gillingham
- Running time: 15–30 minutes

Original release
- Network: CBC Television
- Release: 2 April 1960 – 26 September 1965

Golf With Stan Leonard is a Canadian educational sports television program that aired on CBC Television from 1960 to 1962, and in 1965.

== Premise ==
This was an instructional series on the game of golf, hosted by professional golfer Stan Leonard and sportscaster Ted Reynolds. Episodes were recorded at the Point Grey Golf Course in Vancouver.

== Scheduling ==
The first season consisted of 15-minute episodes aired Saturdays at 6:30 p.m. (Eastern) from 2 April to 25 June 1960. The second season was broadcast Wednesdays at 7:45 p.m. from 5 July to 13 September 1961. The third season returned to the Saturday 6:30 p.m. time slot from 7 April to 30 June 1962. Three years later the final season was expanded to a half-hour time slot, airing Sundays at 5:00 p.m. from 4 July to 26 September 1965.
