= Chung Nan-fei =

Taiwanese weightlifter (born 1928)

Personal information
- Nationality: Taiwanese
- Born: 12 January 1928; Miaoli, Taiwan

Sport
- Sport: Weightlifting

Chung Nan-fei (born 12 January 1928) was a Taiwanese weightlifter. He competed at the 1964 Summer Olympics and the 1968 Summer Olympics.
