= Craig McMorris =

Canadian snowboarder

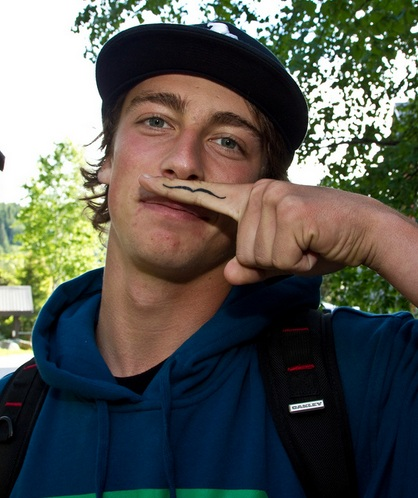
- McMorris in 2011

Personal information
- Full name: Craig McMorris
- Nationality: Canadian
- Born: 14 December 1991 (age 34) Regina, Saskatchewan, Canada
- Height: 5 ft 11 in (1.80 m)

Sport
- Country: Canada
- Sport: Snowboarding
- Event: Slopestyle

Achievements and titles
- Highest world ranking: 50th

Craig McMorris (born December 14, 1991) is a Canadian professional snowboarder and analyst from Regina, Saskatchewan. He is the older brother of snowboarder Mark McMorris and the son of Saskatchewan provincial politician Don McMorris and his wife, Cindy.

McMorris has worked as an analyst for the CBC since 2014, providing snowboarding commentary at the 2014 Winter Olympics, 2018 Winter Olympics, and the 2022 Winter Olympics. He was a CBC cultural correspondent at the 2016 Summer Olympics in Rio de Janeiro, and he worked as a CBC commentator at the 2020 Summer Olympics, covering skateboarding in its Olympic debut. McMorris also participated in the CBC's primetime and opening ceremony coverage of the 2024 Summer Olympics in Paris.

McMorris co-hosted the first season of Canada's Ultimate Challenge with Nikki Reyes.
